= IECO Green Warriors =

- Nickname: Green Warriors
- Founded: 2018
- Main sponsor: IECO
- Head coach: Ariel Vanguardia

The IECO Green Warriors (stylized as iECO) are a Philippine basketball team. It were formed in 2018, as a selection team of players and staff from teams of the PBA Developmental League and was tasked to compete in the 2018 The Terrific 12 tournament of the Asia League. They were also an applicant team seeking to play in the ASEAN Basketball League.

The team's namesake was its sponsor, IECO, an incinerator-waste management firm.

== History ==
Two teams from the Philippine Basketball Association (PBA) were invited to compete in The Terrific 12 tournament of the Asia Basketball League to take place from September 18 to 23, 2018 in Macau but the PBA was unable to accept the invitation due to the tournament having scheduling conflict with the 2018 PBA Governors' Cup. Only one Philippine team was sent to the tournament; a selection team from the PBA Developmental League. The Asia League decided to invite another team from the Chinese Basketball Association to fill in a berth initially intended for a second Philippine team.

Ariel Vanguardia was tasked to coach the PBA D-League All Stars in The Terrific 12. The selection team competed as the "PBA D-League All Stars IECO Green Warriors". The team's roster was formed primarily of players from the finalists of the 2018 PBA D-League Foundation Cup, namely Che'Lu Bar and Grill Revellers and the Go for Gold Scratchers with Richard Howell and Sam Logwood as imports. The team had a tune-up match against the Philippine national team on September 9 at the Meralco Gym in Pasig which it lost 82–99.

The IECO Green Warriors management has considered entering the 2018–19 ASEAN Basketball League season with the team's All-Stars participation in The Terrific 12 considered as a "try-out" for players of the team. By September 11, 2018, the management already applied for a franchise at the ABL. The franchise would have been owned by Dioceldo Sy and Manny Pacquiao should the application have gotten approved. Instead San Miguel Alab Pilipinas were the representatives for that season.

== See also ==
- Philippine Super Liga All-Stars
