= Asia League =

Asia League may refer to:

- Asia League Ice Hockey
- Asia League (basketball)

== See also ==
- AFC Champions League
