= 2019 East Asia Super League season =

- League: East Asia Super League
- Sport: Basketball
- Number of teams: 12

The Terrific 12
- Champions: (China) Liaoning Flying Leopards
- Runners-up: (South Korea) Seoul SK Knights

Seasons
- ← 2018 2023 →

The 2019 East Asia Super League season was the third season of the tournament organized by the Asia League Limited. The sole tournament, The Terrific 12 was held from 17–22 September 2019.

== Results ==
The Terrific 12 tournament was held at the Tap Seac Multi-sports Pavilion in Macau from 17 to 22 September. The FIBA-recognized basketball tournament features three clubs from the Chinese Basketball Association of China, four from the B.League of Japan, two from the Korean Basketball League of South Korea and three from the Philippine Basketball Association of the Philippines.

=== Group stage ===
==== Group A ====
Pos	Team	Pld	W	L	PF	PA	PD	Pts	Qualification
1	(South Korea) Seoul SK Knights	2	2	0	179	153	+26	4	Advance to Semifinal
2	(Japan) Chiba Jets	2	1	1	185	155	+30	3	
3	(Philippines) Blackwater Elite	2	0	2	146	202	−56	2	

Source: Asia League

==== Group B ====
Pos	Team	Pld	W	L	PF	PA	PD	Pts	Qualification
1	(Philippines) San Miguel Beermen	2	2	0	191	168	+23	4	Advance to Semifinal
2	(China) Shenzhen Aviators	2	1	1	191	167	+24	3	
3	(Japan) Ryukyu Golden Kings	2	0	2	169	216	−47	2	

Source: Asia League

==== Group C ====
Pos	Team	Pld	W	L	PF	PA	PD	Pts	Qualification
1	(China) Zhejiang Lions	2	2	0	182	157	+25	4	Advance to Semifinal
2	(South Korea) Jeonju KCC Egis	2	1	1	146	166	−20	3	
3	(Japan) Utsunomiya Brex	2	0	2	168	173	−5	2	

Source: Asia League

==== Group D ====
Pos	Team	Pld	W	L	PF	PA	PD	Pts	Qualification
1	(China) Liaoning Flying Leopards	2	2	0	206	173	+33	4	Advance to Semifinal
2	(Philippines) TNT KaTropa	2	1	1	190	186	+4	3	
3	(Japan) Niigata Albirex Basketball	2	0	2	172	209	−37	2	

Source: Asia League

=== Knockout stage ===
Semi-finals
21 September
(South Korea) Seoul SK Knights	77
(China) Zhejiang Lions	76
21 September
(Philippines) San Miguel Beermen	89
(China) Liaoning Flying Leopards	111

Gold medal match
22 September
(South Korea) Seoul SK Knights	82
(China) Liaoning Flying Leopards	83
Bronze medal match
22 September
(China) Zhejiang Lions	91
(Philippines) San Miguel Beermen	89

==== Semifinal ====
21 September
17:00

Boxscore

Seoul SK Knights (South Korea)	77–76	(China) Zhejiang Lions
Scoring by quarter: 21–29, 18–10, 19–23, 19–14
Pts: Warney 29; Rebs: Warney, Haynes 11; Asts: Haynes 4		Pts: Hu J.Q. 16; Rebs: Reynolds 11; Asts: Su R.Y. 5

Tap Seac Multi-sports Pavilion, São Lázaro
Referees: Harja Jaladri (INA), Yevgeniy Mikheyev (KAZ), Jun Horiuchi (JPN)

21 September
19:00

Boxscore

San Miguel Beermen (Philippines)	89–111	(China) Liaoning Flying Leopards
Scoring by quarter: 23–26, 7–25, 33–34, 26–26
Pts: Romeo 19; Rebs: Prosper 7 Asts: Romeo 6		Pts: Stephenson 29; Rebs: Mejri 11; Asts: Gao S.Y. 5

Tap Seac Multi-sports Pavilion, São Lázaro
Referees: Rabah Noujaim (LIB), Ahmed Ali Al-Shuwaili (IRQ), Budi Marfan (INA)

==== Third place ====
22 September
17:00

Boxscore

Zhejiang Lions (China)	91–89	(Philippines) San Miguel Beermen
Scoring by quarter: 18–18, 19–16, 26–28, 28–27
Pts: Hu J.Q. 31; Rebs: Reynolds 15; Asts: Jackson 8		Pts: Wells 33; Rebs: Prosper 11; Asts: Wells 4

Tap Seac Multi-sports Pavilion, São Lázaro
Referees: Harja Jaladri (INA), Hwang In-Tae (KOR), Leong Chuen Wing (SIN)

==== Final ====
22 September
19:00

Boxscore

Seoul SK Knights (South Korea)	82–83	(China) Liaoning Flying Leopards
Scoring by quarter: 27–20, 11–23, 19–18, 25–22
Pts: Warney 36; Rebs: Warney 17; Asts: Haynes 9		Pts: Stephenson 34; Rebs: Stephenson, Li X.X. 8 Asts: Gao S.Y. 7

Tap Seac Multi-sports Pavilion, São Lázaro
Attendance: 2,000
Referees: Rabah Noujaim (LIB), Ahmed Ali Al-Shuwaili (IRQ), Budi Marfan (INA)

== Asia League Fest ==
As part of The Terrific 12, an evening concert named the Asia League Fest was held on 21 September featuring musical artists from mainland China, Japan, the Philippines, South Korea and Taiwan. The event featured known artists such as MC Jin, James Reid, Jess Connelly, Minzy, Julia Wu, Motherbasss, Blacklist Music and Soler.
