= 2018 Asia League season =

- League: Asia League Limited
- Sport: Basketball
- Teams: Summer Super 8: 8 The Terrific 12: 12

Summer Super 8
- Champions: (China) Guangzhou Long Lions
- Runners-up: (South Korea) Seoul Samsung Thunders

The Terrific 12
- Champions: (Japan) Ryukyu Golden Kings
- Runners-up: (China) Guangzhou Long Lions

Seasons
- ← 2017 2019 →

The 2018 Asia League season consisted of the Summer Super 8 tournament in July and the Terrific 12 tournament in September, which are organized by Asia League Limited.

== Summer Super 8 ==
The Summer Super 8, which featured eight teams was held from 17 to 22 July 2018 at the Macau East Asian Games Dome in Cotai, Macau. The Guangzhou Long Lions of the Chinese Basketball Association won over the Seoul Samsung Thunders of the Korean Basketball League in the final.

=== Knock-out stages ===
==== Semifinals ====
22 July
17:00

Boxscore

Incheon Electroland Elephants (South Korea)	74–84	(South Korea) Seoul Samsung Thunders

Macau East Asian Games Dome, Cotai

22 July
19:00

Boxscore

Guangzhou Long Lions (China)	75–63	(Philippines) NLEX Road Warriors

Macau East Asian Games Dome, Cotai

==== Third place ====
22 July
17:00

Boxscore

Incheon Electroland Elephants (South Korea)	67–62	(Philippines) NLEX Road Warriors

Macau East Asian Games Dome, Cotai

==== Final ====
22 July
19:00

Boxscore

Seoul Samsung Thunders (South Korea)	72–78	(China) Guangzhou Long Lions

Macau East Asian Games Dome, Cotai

== The Terrific 12 ==
The Terrific 12 tournament took place at the Studio City Event Center in Macau from 18 to 23 September. Unlike in the Super Summer 8, imports are eligible to compete in The Terrific 12. The group stage featured four groups of three with the top team advancing to the semifinal.

=== Group stage ===
==== Group A ====
Pos	Team	Pld	W	L	PF	PA	PD	Pts	Qualification
1	(Japan) Nagoya Diamond Dolphins	2	2	0	163	143	+20	4	Advance to Semifinal
2	(China) Zhejiang Guangsha Lions	2	1	1	167	173	−6	3	
3	(Chinese Taipei) Yulon Luxgen Dinos	2	0	2	166	180	−14	2	

Updated to match(es) played on unknown. Source: Asia League

==== Group B ====
Pos	Team	Pld	W	L	PF	PA	PD	Pts	Qualification
1	(China) Guangzhou Long Lions	2	2	0	190	180	+10	4	Advance to Semifinal
2	(South Korea) Ulsan Hyundai Mobis Phoebus	2	1	1	174	169	+5	3	
3	(Japan) Chiba Jets	2	0	2	154	169	−15	2	

Updated to match(es) played on unknown. Source: Asia League

==== Group C ====
Pos	Team	Pld	W	L	PF	PA	PD	Pts	Qualification
1	(Japan) Ryukyu Golden Kings	2	2	0	177	134	+43	4	Advance to Semifinal
2	(China) Xinjiang Flying Tigers	2	1	1	166	177	−11	3	
3	(Philippines) iECO Green Warriors	2	0	2	178	210	−32	2	

Updated to match(es) played on unknown. Source: Asia League

==== Group D ====
Pos	Team	Pld	W	L	PF	PA	PD	Pts	Qualification
1	(South Korea) Seoul Samsung Thunders	2	2	0	169	155	+14	4	Advance to Semifinal
2	(Chinese Taipei) Fubon Braves	2	1	1	164	163	+1	3	
3	(China) Shandong Golden Stars	2	0	2	152	167	−15	2	

Updated to match(es) played on unknown. Source: Asia League

=== Knockout stage ===
==== Semifinal ====
22 July
17:00

Boxscore

Nagoya Diamond Dolphins (Japan)	48–66	(Japan) Ryukyu Golden Kings

Macau East Asian Games Dome, Cotai

22 July
19:00

Boxscore

Guangzhou Long Lions (China)	88–74	(South Korea) Seoul Samsung Thunders

Studio City Macau, Cotai

==== Third place ====
23 July
17:00

Boxscore

Nagoya Diamond Dolphins (Japan)	92–105	(South Korea) Seoul Samsung Thunders

Macau East Asian Games Dome, Cotai

==== Final ====
23 July
19:00

Boxscore

Ryukyu Golden Kings (Japan)	85–76	(China) Guangzhou Long Lions

Macau East Asian Games Dome, Cotai

== Summer Super 8 Coaches' Clinic ==
The Summer Super 8 Coaches’ Clinic was led by CBA Xinjiang Flying Tigers’ head coach Brian Goorjian, and former B.LEAGUE Tochigi Brex head coach Thomas Wisman. The clinic also featured former Philippine national team player and ABL San Miguel Alab Pilipinas head coach Jimmy Alapag.

The two-day programme was delivered at the tournament venue, the Macao East Asian Games Dome, from 19 – 20 July 2018. 58 coaches from around the region participated in the clinic, all of whom received Asia League certification following its completion.
