= 2014 NBA playoffs =

Postseason tournament

Tournament details
- Dates: April 19–June 15, 2014
- Season: 2013–14
- Teams: 16

Final positions
- Champions: San Antonio Spurs (5th title)
- Runners-up: Miami Heat
- Semifinalists: Indiana Pacers; Oklahoma City Thunder

Tournament statistics
- Scoring leader(s): Kevin Durant (Thunder) (29.6 PPG)

Awards
- MVP: Kawhi Leonard (Spurs)

The 2014 NBA playoffs was the postseason tournament of the National Basketball Association's 2013–14 season. The tournament concluded with the Western Conference champion San Antonio Spurs defeating the two-time defending NBA champion and Eastern Conference champion Miami Heat 4 games to 1 in the NBA Finals. Kawhi Leonard was named NBA Finals MVP.

== Overview ==
The 2014 NBA Playoffs marked the final postseason that the NBA Playoffs and Finals logos were applied on the qualifiers' courts until 2020, when digital logos were used instead of decals. They were also the first playoffs overseen by Commissioner Adam Silver.

=== Western Conference ===
The San Antonio Spurs continued the longest active playoff streak in the NBA at 17 straight appearances.

All three teams from Texas made the playoffs for the first time since 2009.

The Dallas Mavericks returned to the playoffs after a one-season absence while the Portland Trail Blazers returned to the playoffs for the first time since 2011.

The Denver Nuggets missed the playoffs for the first time since 2003.

The Los Angeles Lakers also missed the playoffs for the first time since 2005.

=== Eastern Conference ===
The Atlanta Hawks, despite holding a sub–.500 record, made the playoffs for the seventh consecutive postseason, continuing the longest active postseason streak in the Eastern Conference.

The Toronto Raptors and Washington Wizards made their first playoff appearances since 2008.

The Charlotte Bobcats made their final playoff appearance before renaming themselves the Hornets, returned after a four-year absence.

The New York Knicks missed the playoffs for the first time since 2010. The Boston Celtics also missed the playoffs for the first (and only) time since 2007. For the first time since 1994, the Lakers and Celtics missed the playoffs in the same season. In addition, this was the first and only time in NBA history that the Knicks, Celtics, and Lakers missed the playoffs in the same year.

=== First Round ===
The first round of the 2014 Playoffs is generally considered one of the greatest postseason rounds in NBA history. The first 11 days of the playoffs saw at least one road team win. That ended on April 30 with the Raptors, Spurs, and Houston Rockets all winning at home against the Brooklyn Nets, Dallas Mavericks, and Portland Trail Blazers, respectively. The 24 road wins is an NBA playoffs record for the first round. In addition, the 2014 playoffs featured a record eight first-round games that went into overtime, including four straight between the Memphis Grizzlies and Oklahoma City Thunder (Games 2–5), another NBA record.

This postseason and the previous year's postseason marked the first time since the 2000 and 2001 playoffs that both number 5 seeds knocked out both number 4 seeds in back–to–back years. The Washington Wizards eliminated the Chicago Bulls 4-1 while the Portland Trail Blazers eliminated the Houston Rockets 4–2.

Game 6 of the Rockets–Trail Blazers series was highlighted by Damian Lillard's series winning three pointer over Chandler Parsons to win the game and the series. With the win, the Trail Blazers won their first playoff series since 2000.

The Hawks–Pacers series was the first series to force a Game 7, making this postseason the 15th consecutive postseason to have at least one Game 7. The 1999 NBA playoffs were the last time a Game 7 wasn't played.

Five of the eight first–round series were extended to game sevens. Three of the series, Atlanta Hawks at Indiana Pacers, Memphis Grizzlies at Oklahoma City Thunder, and Golden State Warriors at Los Angeles Clippers, were played on May 3, which marked the first time (and currently only) in NBA history that three Game 7s were played on the same day. Two other game sevens were played on the following day, featuring Dallas at San Antonio and Brooklyn at Toronto. The five game sevens in the first round already tied the record for the most number of game sevens in any NBA playoffs, set in the 1994 NBA playoffs. However, the NBA only adopted a best–of–seven format for the first round beginning in 2003.

Game 7 of the Raptors–Nets series was the first Game 7 ever played outside the United States. The Nets won this game, thanks to Paul Pierce's series winning block over Kyle Lowry. This would be the last Game 7 won by a road team until the 2016 NBA Finals.

=== Conference Semifinals ===
Game 4 of the Heat–Nets series saw LeBron James record a Heat franchise playoff high 49 points. He eventually led the Miami Heat to their fourth consecutive Eastern Conference Finals appearance with a win in Game 5.

With a Game 5 win over the Portland Trail Blazers, the San Antonio Spurs advanced to the Western Conference Finals for the third consecutive postseason.

With a Game 6 win over the Washington Wizards, the Indiana Pacers made the Eastern Conference Finals for the second consecutive postseason. This also marked the first time since 1998–2000 that the Pacers made the ECF in consecutive seasons. This would be last playoff series victory by the Pacers until 2024.

=== Conference Finals ===
This year's conference finals marked the first postseason (and the seventh time since 1972, when the current playoff system was put in place) in which the top two seeds played in the Conference Finals both in the East and the West.

With their Game 2 win over the Indiana Pacers, the Miami Heat set an NBA record by recording their 15th straight playoff series in which they earned at least one road win.

With their Game 6 win over the Indiana Pacers, the Miami Heat made the NBA Finals for the fourth straight season. The Heat were the first team other than the Boston Celtics and Los Angeles Lakers to accomplish this feat.

With their Game 6 overtime win over the Oklahoma City Thunder, the San Antonio Spurs made the NBA Finals for the second straight season. This marked the first time in franchise history that the Spurs made the Finals in consecutive seasons.

=== NBA Finals ===
The 2014 NBA Finals were notable for several things.

For the first time since 1998, there would be a rematch of last year's finalists. In this case: the Miami Heat and the San Antonio Spurs met for the second consecutive season.

This was the first NBA Finals under commissioner Adam Silver.

For the first time since 1984, the NBA Finals were played in a 2–2–1–1–1 format (the higher seed hosts Games 1, 2, 5, and 7, the lower seed hosts Games 3, 4, and 6).

Game 1: The air conditioning at the AT&T Center broke, resulting in sweltering conditions. LeBron James left the game with cramps.

Game 2: With the win, the Miami Heat extended their playoff road record to 16 straight playoff series in which they won a road game.

Game 3: In the first half, the San Antonio Spurs set an NBA record for accuracy (in shots made). The Spurs won this game, and took a 2–1 series lead. The Miami Heat, on the other hand, lost their first home playoff game of the season.

Game 4: The Miami Heat lost consecutive postseason games for the first time since 2012. The San Antonio Spurs, on the other hand, took a 3–1 series lead.

Game 5: Overcoming a double digit first quarter deficit, the San Antonio Spurs won the game and the NBA Finals four games to one. This was also the final game of the Miami Heat's big three era as LeBron would return to Cleveland for the following season.

== Format ==
Within each conference, the three division winners and the five non-division winners with the most wins qualified for the playoffs. The seedings are based on each team's record; however, a division winner is guaranteed to be ranked at least fourth, regardless of record.

Each conference's bracket is fixed; there is no reseeding. All rounds are best-of-seven series; the team that has four wins advances to the next round. As stated above, all rounds, including the NBA Finals, are in a 2–2–1–1–1 format. Home court advantage in any round does not necessarily belong to the higher-seeded team, but instead to the team with the better regular season record. If two teams with the same record meet in a round, standard tiebreaker rules are used. The rule for determining home court advantage in the NBA Finals is winning percentage, then head-to-head record, followed by record vs. opposite conference.

=== Tiebreak procedures ===
The tiebreakers that determine seedings are:

1. Division leader wins tie from team not leading a division
2. Head-to-head record
3. Division record (if all the tied teams are in the same division)
4. Conference record
5. Record vs. playoff teams, own conference
6. Record vs. playoff teams, other conference (only in two-way tie)
7. Point differential, all games

If there were more than two teams tied, the team that wins the tiebreaker gets the highest seed, while the other teams were "re-broken" from the first step until all ties were resolved. Since the three division winners were guaranteed a spot in the top four, ties to determine the division winners had to be broken before any other ties.

== Playoff qualifying ==
=== Eastern Conference ===
Seed	Team	Record	Clinched			
Seed	Team	Record	Playoff berth	Division title	Best record in Conference	Best record in NBA
1	Indiana Pacers	56-26	March 5	March 26	April 14	—
2	Miami Heat	54-28	March 10	March 28	—	—
3	Toronto Raptors	48-34 (Note: Toronto Raptors clinched #3 seed over Chicago Bulls based on winning Atlantic Division.)	March 28	April 11	—	—
4	Chicago Bulls	48-34	March 28	—	—	—
5	Washington Wizards	44-38 (Note: Washington Wizards clinched #5 seed over Brooklyn Nets based on a 3–0 regular season series record.)	April 2	—	—	—
6	Brooklyn Nets	44-38	April 1	—	—	—
7	Charlotte Bobcats	43-39	April 5	—	—	—
8	Atlanta Hawks	38-44	April 12	—	—	—

— = Did not achieve

=== Western Conference ===
Seed	Team	Record	Clinched			
Seed	Team	Record	Playoff berth	Division title	Best record in Conference	Best record in NBA
1	San Antonio Spurs	62-20	March 22	April 2	April 11	April 11
2	Oklahoma City Thunder	59-23	March 27	April 4	—	—
3	Los Angeles Clippers	57-25	March 29	April 2	—	—
4	Houston Rockets	54-28 (Note: Houston Rockets clinched #4 seed over Portland Trail Blazers based on a 3–1 regular season series record.)	April 4	—	—	—
5	Portland Trail Blazers	54-28	April 6	—	—	—
6	Golden State Warriors	51-31	April 11	—	—	—
7	Memphis Grizzlies	50-32	April 14	—	—	—
8	Dallas Mavericks	49-33	April 12	—	—	—

— = Did not achieve

== Bracket ==
Teams in bold advanced to the next round. The numbers to the left of each team indicate the team's seeding in its conference, and the numbers to the right indicate the number of games the team won in that round. The division champions are marked by an asterisk. Teams with home court advantage are shown in italics.

First Round	Conference Semifinals
**E1**	**Indiana***	**4**
E8	Atlanta	3
**E1**	**Indiana***	**4**
E5	Washington	2
E4	Chicago	1
**E5**	**Washington**	**4**
**Eastern Conference**
E3	Toronto*	3
**E6**	**Brooklyn**	**4**
E6	Brooklyn	1
**E2**	**Miami***	**4**
**E2**	**Miami***	**4**
E7	Charlotte	0
**W1**	**San Antonio***	**4**
W8	Dallas	3
**W1**	**San Antonio***	**4**
W5	Portland	1
W4	Houston	2
**W5**	**Portland**	**4**
**Western Conference**
**W3**	**LA Clippers***	**4**
W6	Golden State	3
W3	LA Clippers*	2
**W2**	**Oklahoma City***	**4**
**W2**	**Oklahoma City***	**4**
W7	Memphis	3

Conference Finals
E1	Indiana*	2
**E2**	**Miami***	**4**
**W1**	**San Antonio***	**4**
W2	Oklahoma City*	2

NBA Finals
E2	Miami*	1
**W1**	**San Antonio***	**4**

- * Division winner
- **Bold** Series winner
- Italics Team with home-court advantage

== First round ==
All times are in Eastern Daylight Time (UTC−4)

=== Eastern Conference first round ===
==== (1) Indiana Pacers vs. (8) Atlanta Hawks ====
ESPN

April 19
7:00 pm

Boxscore

Atlanta Hawks 101, Indiana Pacers 93
Scoring by quarter: 28–22, 22–28, 30–16, 21–27
Pts: Jeff Teague 28; Rebs: DeMarre Carroll 10; Asts: Jeff Teague 5	Pts: Paul George 24; Rebs: Paul George 10; Asts: Paul George 5
Atlanta leads series, 1–0

Bankers Life Fieldhouse, Indianapolis
Attendance: 18,165
Referees: Danny Crawford, James Capers, Josh Tiven

TNT

April 22
7:00 pm

Boxscore

Atlanta Hawks 85, Indiana Pacers 101
Scoring by quarter: 16–21, 26–27, 13–31, 30–22
Pts: Paul Millsap 19; Rebs: Elton Brand 7 Asts: Jeff Teague 4	Pts: Paul George 27; Rebs: Paul George 10; Asts: George, West 6 each
Series tied, 1–1

Bankers Life Fieldhouse, Indianapolis
Attendance: 18,165
Referees: Ken Mauer, Tony Brown, Marc Davis

NBA TV

April 24
7:00 pm

Boxscore

Indiana Pacers 85, Atlanta Hawks 98
Scoring by quarter: 24–24, 14–15, 20–28, 27–31
Pts: Lance Stephenson 21; Rebs: Paul George 14; Asts: David West 5	Pts: Jeff Teague 22; Rebs: Paul Millsap 14; Asts: Jeff Teague 10
Atlanta leads series, 2–1

Philips Arena, Atlanta
Attendance: 18,124
Referees: Tony Brothers, Mark Ayotte, Tom Washington

TNT

April 26
2:00 pm

Boxscore

Indiana Pacers 91, Atlanta Hawks 88
Scoring by quarter: 29–22, 13–26, 24–17, 25–23
Pts: Paul George 24; Rebs: Paul George 10; Asts: George, Hill 5 each	Pts: Paul Millsap 29; Rebs: Kyle Korver 9 Asts: Jeff Teague 7
Series tied, 2–2

Philips Arena, Atlanta
Attendance: 19,043
Referees: Scott Foster, Pat Fraher, Bill Kennedy

NBA TV

April 28
8:00 pm

Boxscore

Atlanta Hawks 107, Indiana Pacers 97
Scoring by quarter: 20–21, 41–19, 26–27, 20–30
Pts: Shelvin Mack 20; Rebs: Kyle Korver 9 Asts: Shelvin Mack 5	Pts: Paul George 26; Rebs: Paul George 12; Asts: David West 7
Atlanta leads series, 3–2

Bankers Life Fieldhouse, Indianapolis
Attendance: 18,165
Referees: Monty McCutchen, John Goble, David Jones

NBA TV

May 1
7:00 pm

Boxscore

Indiana Pacers 95, Atlanta Hawks 88
Scoring by quarter: 20–22, 24–17, 20–28, 31–21
Pts: George, West 24 each Rebs: David West 11; Asts: David West 6	Pts: Jeff Teague 29; Rebs: Paul Millsap 18; Asts: Paul Millsap 5
Series tied, 3–3

Philips Arena, Atlanta
Attendance: 19,044
Referees: Joe Crawford, Derrick Stafford, Bennett Salvatore

TNT

May 3
5:30 pm

Boxscore

Atlanta Hawks 80, Indiana Pacers 92
Scoring by quarter: 23–24, 13–23, 27–24, 17–21
Pts: Kyle Korver 19; Rebs: Paul Millsap 17; Asts: Shelvin Mack 7	Pts: Paul George 30; Rebs: Lance Stephenson 14; Asts: Lance Stephenson 5
Indiana wins series, 4–3

Bankers Life Fieldhouse, Indianapolis
Attendance: 18,165
Referees: Tony Brothers, Sean Corbin, Rodney Mott

With the season series between the two tied at 2 games apiece and Indiana's post All-Star break malaise, the series was expected to be closer than the seedings might suggest. In Game 1, the Pacers' struggles continued as the Hawks snatched away home-court advantage and took a 1–0 series lead. In Game 2, the Pacers were in danger of falling 0–2 in the series after the Hawks led by as much as 11 in the first half. However, the Pacers used a big 32–6 run spanning the second and third periods to take a 101–85 win and tie the series at 1 apiece. In Game 3, the Hawks blew the game open in the second half to take a 98–85 win and a surprising 2–1 series lead. In Game 4, the Pacers were once again in danger after the Hawks led by as much as 10 before the Pacers started to rally back. Paul George and David West hit crucial threes in the final quarter to give the Pacers a 91–88 win and tie the series at 2 all. The Hawks still had a chance to force overtime but Pero Antić missed his three-pointer as the Pacers took back home-court advantage.

In Game 5, the Hawks embarrassed the Pacers as they used a big second quarter to take a commanding lead of as much as 30 before holding off the Pacers for a 107–97 win and a 3–2 series lead, putting the 1st-seeded Pacers on the brink of elimination. In Game 6, the Hawks looked like they were in position for the upset when they led by 5 with about 3 minutes remaining in the fourth quarter. However, West led the way for the Pacers as they forced a decisive Game 7 with a 95–88 win. The Pacers were able to finish off the Hawks in Game 7 with a 92–80 win to avoid becoming the sixth first-seeded team to lose a series to an eight-seeded team in NBA history.

Regular-season series

Tied 2–2 in the regular-season series

January 8, 2014

Recap

Indiana Pacers 87, Atlanta Hawks 97

Philips Arena, Atlanta

February 4, 2014

Recap

Indiana Pacers 89, Atlanta Hawks 85

Philips Arena, Atlanta

February 18, 2014

Recap

Atlanta Hawks 98, Indiana Pacers 108

Bankers Life Fieldhouse, Indianapolis

April 6, 2014

Recap

Atlanta Hawks 107, Indiana Pacers 88

Bankers Life Fieldhouse, Indianapolis

This was the sixth playoff meeting between these two teams, with the Pacers winning three of the first five meetings.

Previous playoff series
Indiana leads 3–2 in all-time playoff series

1987

Atlanta Hawks 3, Indiana Pacers 1

1987 Eastern Conference First Round

1994

Atlanta Hawks 2, Indiana Pacers 4

1994 Eastern Conference Semifinals

1995

Atlanta Hawks 0, Indiana Pacers 3

1995 Eastern Conference First Round

1996

Atlanta Hawks 3, Indiana Pacers 2

1996 Eastern Conference First Round

2013

Atlanta Hawks 2, Indiana Pacers 4

2013 Eastern Conference First Round

==== (2) Miami Heat vs. (7) Charlotte Bobcats ====
ABC

April 20
3:30 pm

Boxscore

Charlotte Bobcats 88, Miami Heat 99
Scoring by quarter: 23–19, 19–30, 23–23, 23–27
Pts: Kemba Walker 20; Rebs: Al Jefferson 10; Asts: Kemba Walker 6	Pts: LeBron James 27; Rebs: Chris Andersen 10; Asts: Dwyane Wade 5
Miami leads series, 1–0

AmericanAirlines Arena, Miami
Attendance: 19,640
Referees: Marc Davis, Jason Phillips, Scott Wall

TNT

April 23
7:00 pm

Boxscore

Charlotte Bobcats 97, Miami Heat 101
Scoring by quarter: 19–29, 28–28, 25–22, 25–22
Pts: Michael Kidd-Gilchrist 22; Rebs: Al Jefferson 13; Asts: Kemba Walker 8	Pts: LeBron James 32; Rebs: James, Wade 6 each Asts: LeBron James 8
Miami leads series, 2–0

AmericanAirlines Arena, Miami
Attendance: 19,603
Referees: Scott Foster, Bill Kennedy, Mark Lindsay

ESPN

April 26
7:00 pm

Boxscore

Miami Heat 98, Charlotte Bobcats 85
Scoring by quarter: 23–27, 35–19, 28–19, 12–20
Pts: LeBron James 30; Rebs: LeBron James 10; Asts: James, Wade 6 each	Pts: Al Jefferson 20; Rebs: Josh McRoberts 9 Asts: Luke Ridnour 6
Miami leads series, 3–0

Time Warner Cable Arena, Charlotte, North Carolina
Attendance: 19,633
Referees: Monty McCutchen, Ron Garretson, Mark Ayotte

TNT

April 28
7:00 pm

Boxscore

Miami Heat 109, Charlotte Bobcats 98
Scoring by quarter: 26–27, 26–27, 32–17, 25–27
Pts: LeBron James 31; Rebs: Chris Bosh 8 Asts: LeBron James 9	Pts: Kemba Walker 29; Rebs: Josh McRoberts 10; Asts: Walker, McRoberts 5 each
Miami wins series, 4–0

Time Warner Cable Arena, Charlotte, North Carolina
Attendance: 19,092
Referees: Danny Crawford, Michael Smith, Tom Washington

The series pitted the two-time defending champions against a franchise only in its second playoff appearance ever (the Bobcats first played in the playoffs in 2010). As a result, the Bobcats were deemed heavy underdogs against the Heat. In Game 1, the Bobcats started strong, leading by as much as 9, but were dealt a big blow when their franchise player, Al Jefferson, suffered a left plantar fascia strain following a misstep in the first quarter. The Heat then rallied after receiving a big boost from seldom-used James Jones, who scored 12 points, allowing them to eventually pull away in the fourth quarter for a 99–88 win in the series opener. In Game 2, the Heat were able to build a 16-point first half lead before the Bobcats started to rally back. The Bobcats had a chance to force overtime, but Dwyane Wade came up with a key steal and a free throw to ice the game and give the Heat a 2–0 lead.

In Game 3, the Bobcats started strong once again, led by Jefferson who scored 15 points in the first quarter, but the Heat again rallied behind LeBron James, who led the Heat with 30 points. The Heat led by as much as 26 before holding on for a 98–85 win and a commanding 3–0 series lead. In Game 4, the Bobcats played without Jefferson who was plagued by the injury he suffered in Game 1, leaving Kemba Walker to lead the team. Although he scored 29 points on 11/15 shooting, the Heat were able to complete the sweep with a big third quarter, sending them to the second round, and in the process ending the tenure of the Charlotte Bobcats, who became the Charlotte Hornets starting next season.

Regular-season series

Miami won 4–0 in the regular-season series

November 16, 2013

Recap

Miami Heat 97, Charlotte Bobcats 81

Time Warner Cable Arena, Charlotte, North Carolina

December 1, 2013

Recap

Charlotte Bobcats 98, Miami Heat 99

AmericanAirlines Arena, Miami

January 18, 2014

Recap

Miami Heat 104, Charlotte Bobcats 96 (OT)

Time Warner Cable Arena, Charlotte, North Carolina

March 3, 2014

Recap

Charlotte Bobcats 107, Miami Heat 124

AmericanAirlines Arena, Miami

This was the second playoff meeting between these two teams, with the Hornets winning the first meeting. Note that historical records of the original Charlotte Hornets franchise (later relocated and renamed the New Orleans Pelicans) from 1988 to 2002 are currently with the present Hornets/Bobcats franchise since the 2014–15 season.

Previous playoff series
Charlotte leads 1–0 in all-time playoff series

2001

Charlotte Hornets 3, Miami Heat 0

2001 Eastern Conference First Round

==== (3) Toronto Raptors vs. (6) Brooklyn Nets ====
ESPN

April 19
12:30 pm

Boxscore

Brooklyn Nets 94, Toronto Raptors 87
Scoring by quarter: 29–21, 21–25, 17–16, 27–25
Pts: Johnson, Williams 24 each Rebs: Garnett, Johnson 8 each Asts: Johnson, Pierce 4 each	Pts: Kyle Lowry 22; Rebs: Jonas Valančiūnas 18; Asts: Lowry, Vásquez 8 each
Brooklyn leads series, 1–0

Air Canada Centre, Toronto, Ontario
Attendance: 19,800
Referees: Ken Mauer, Brian Forte, Ed Malloy

NBA TV

April 22
8:00 pm

Boxscore

Brooklyn Nets 95, Toronto Raptors 100
Scoring by quarter: 19–21, 20–24, 27–19, 29–36
Pts: Joe Johnson 18; Rebs: Pierce, Plumlee 6 each Asts: Livingston, Williams 5 each	Pts: DeMar DeRozan 30; Rebs: Jonas Valančiūnas 14; Asts: Greivis Vásquez 8
Series tied, 1–1

Air Canada Centre, Toronto, Ontario
Attendance: 20,382
Referees: Monty McCutchen, David Jones, Gary Zielinski

ESPN2

April 25
7:00 pm

Boxscore

Toronto Raptors 98, Brooklyn Nets 102
Scoring by quarter: 23–19, 22–30, 21–28, 32–25
Pts: DeMar DeRozan 30; Rebs: Jonas Valančiūnas 10; Asts: Greivis Vásquez 6	Pts: Joe Johnson 29; Rebs: Shaun Livingston 6 Asts: Deron Williams 8
Brooklyn leads series, 2–1

Barclays Center, Brooklyn, New York City
Attendance: 17,732
Referees: Mike Callahan, Rodney Mott, Scott Wall

TNT

April 27
7:00 pm

Boxscore

Toronto Raptors 87, Brooklyn Nets 79
Scoring by quarter: 35–22, 16–22, 16–23, 20–12
Pts: DeMar DeRozan 24; Rebs: Patrick Patterson 9 Asts: Greivis Vásquez 9	Pts: Paul Pierce 22; Rebs: Andray Blatche 7 Asts: Deron Williams 6
Series tied, 2–2

Barclays Center, Brooklyn, New York City
Attendance: 17,732
Referees: Jason Phillips, James Capers, Zach Zarba

NBA TV

April 30
7:30 pm

Boxscore

Brooklyn Nets 113, Toronto Raptors 115
Scoring by quarter: 25–28, 19–34, 25–29, 44–24
Pts: Joe Johnson 30; Rebs: Mirza Teletović 7 Asts: Deron Williams 9	Pts: Kyle Lowry 36; Rebs: Patrick Patterson 8 Asts: Kyle Lowry 6
Toronto leads series, 3–2

Air Canada Centre, Toronto, Ontario
Attendance: 20,393
Referees: Scott Foster, Tom Washington, Bill Kennedy

ESPN2

May 2
7:00 pm

Boxscore

Toronto Raptors 83, Brooklyn Nets 97
Scoring by quarter: 19–34, 22–26, 18–19, 24–18
Pts: DeMar DeRozan 28; Rebs: Jonas Valančiūnas 9 Asts: DeRozan, Lowry 4	Pts: Deron Williams 23; Rebs: Alan Anderson 9 Asts: Deron Williams 4
Series tied, 3–3

Barclays Center, Brooklyn, New York City
Attendance: 17,732
Referees: Danny Crawford, Marc Davis, Pat Fraher

ABC

May 4
1:00 pm

Boxscore

Brooklyn Nets 104, Toronto Raptors 103
Scoring by quarter: 26–28, 35–25, 20–20, 23–30
Pts: Joe Johnson 26; Rebs: Kevin Garnett 11; Asts: Johnson, Williams 4	Pts: Kyle Lowry 28; Rebs: Amir Johnson 10; Asts: DeMar DeRozan 6
Brooklyn wins series, 4–3

Air Canada Centre, Toronto, Ontario
Attendance: 20,457
Referees: Joe Crawford, Bill Spooner, Derrick Stafford

The Raptors and the Nets faced off in the playoffs once again after they previously faced each other in 2007, when the Nets prevailed in six games. In Game 1, Paul Pierce led the way for the Nets in the clutch as they stole Game 1, 94–87, and home-court advantage from the Raptors. In Game 2, the Raptors led by as much as 11 in the first half before holding off the Nets in the final quarter to tie the series at 1 all. In Game 3, the Nets led by 15 with about 5 minutes remaining in the final period before the Raptors stormed back. With a chance to force overtime, Raptors forward Patrick Patterson missed two crucial free throws as the Nets held on for a 102–98 win and a 2–1 lead. In Game 4, in a reversal of Game 3, the Raptors were able to build a 17-point lead in the first half before the Nets rallied back to tie the game heading into the final period. However, the Raptors finished the game on a 9–0 run to win the game, 87–79, and tie the series at 2 each.

In Game 5, the Raptors dominated the first three quarters to lead by as much as 26 but the Nets stormed back in the final quarter. With a chance to force overtime, Andray Blatche threw an errant pass that resulted in a backcourt violation, giving the Raptors the win and the crucial 3–2 series lead, but not before the play was reviewed because it was thought that the ball might have been tipped back before Deron Williams fired a half-court shot that was goaltended by Jonas Valančiūnas. The Nets then proceeded to blow out the Raptors in Game 6 to force a seventh and decisive game. Game 7 was close up until the final seconds of the game. With the Nets leading by 1, Kyle Lowry had a chance to win the game and the series for the Raptors but Pierce blocked his shot, giving the Nets the win and the series victory.

Regular-season series

Tied 2–2 in the regular-season series

November 26, 2013

Recap

Brooklyn Nets 102, Toronto Raptors 100

Air Canada Centre, Toronto, Ontario

January 11, 2014

Recap

Brooklyn Nets 80, Toronto Raptors 96

Air Canada Centre, Toronto, Ontario

January 22, 2014

Recap

Toronto Raptors 104, Brooklyn Nets 103

Barclays Center, Brooklyn, New York City

March 10, 2014

Recap

Toronto Raptors 97, Brooklyn Nets 101

Barclays Center, Brooklyn, New York City

This was the second playoff meeting between these two teams, with the Nets winning the first meeting.

Previous playoff series
Brooklyn/New Jersey leads 1–0 in all-time playoff series

2007

New Jersey Nets 4, Toronto Raptors 2

2007 Eastern Conference First Round

- This is the most recent playoff series between the Raptors & Nets until 2020.

==== (4) Chicago Bulls vs. (5) Washington Wizards ====
TNT

April 20
7:00 pm

Boxscore

Washington Wizards 102, Chicago Bulls 93
Scoring by quarter: 24–22, 24–32, 24–21, 30–18
Pts: Nenê 24; Rebs: Marcin Gortat 13; Asts: Bradley Beal 7	Pts: Hinrich, Augustin 16 each Rebs: Joakim Noah 10; Asts: Joakim Noah 4
Washington leads series, 1–0

United Center, Chicago
Attendance: 21,694
Referees: Monty McCutchen, David Jones, Gary Zielinski

TNT

April 22
9:30 pm

Boxscore

Washington Wizards 101, Chicago Bulls 99 (OT)
Scoring by quarter: 31–20, 25–29, 14–26, 21–16, Overtime: 10–8
Pts: Bradley Beal 26; Rebs: Ariza, Booker 8 each Asts: Ariza, Wall 7 each	Pts: D. J. Augustin 25; Rebs: Joakim Noah 10; Asts: D. J. Augustin 7
Washington leads series, 2–0

United Center, Chicago
Attendance: 21,663
Referees: Joe Crawford, Bennie Adams, Bill Spooner

ESPN

April 25
8:00 pm

Boxscore

Chicago Bulls 100, Washington Wizards 97
Scoring by quarter: 28–30, 20–21, 24–18, 28–28
Pts: Mike Dunleavy Jr. 35; Rebs: Joakim Noah 9 Asts: D. J. Augustin 7	Pts: Bradley Beal 25; Rebs: Gortat, Ariza 11 each Asts: John Wall 7
Washington leads series, 2–1

Verizon Center, Washington, D.C.
Attendance: 23,356
Referees: James Capers, Jason Phillips, Zach Zarba

ABC

April 27
1:00 pm

Boxscore

Chicago Bulls 89, Washington Wizards 98
Scoring by quarter: 18–28, 22–27, 22–27, 27–16
Pts: Taj Gibson 32; Rebs: Joakim Noah 15; Asts: Kirk Hinrich 7	Pts: Trevor Ariza 30; Rebs: Trevor Booker 9 Asts: John Wall 10
Washington leads series, 3–1

Verizon Center, Washington, D.C.
Attendance: 20,356
Referees: Mike Callahan, Tony Brown, Rodney Mott

TNT

April 29
8:00 pm

Boxscore

Washington Wizards 75, Chicago Bulls 69
Scoring by quarter: 23–15, 18–26, 20–11, 14–17
Pts: John Wall 24; Rebs: Marcin Gortat 13; Asts: Nenê, Beal, Wall 4 each	Pts: Hinrich, Butler 16 each Rebs: Joakim Noah 18; Asts: Joakim Noah 7
Washington wins series, 4–1

United Center, Chicago
Attendance: 21,752
Referees: Ken Mauer, Ed Malloy, Bennett Salvatore

The Bulls tried to make it through the playoffs for a third straight year without their main superstar, Derrick Rose, who suffered an early season-ending injury. Meanwhile, the Wizards made the playoffs for only the first time since 2008. As such, the series was expected to be evenly matched, although most analysts predicted a Bulls series victory. In Game 1, the Bulls led by as much as 13 in the third quarter before the Wizards soon started their comeback. Led by Nenê's 24 points, the Wizards used a big fourth quarter to rally back for a 102–93 win and to steal home-court advantage away from the Bulls. In Game 2, the Wizards again rallied back from 10 down in regulation to force overtime before hanging on for a 101–99 win to go up 2–0 in the series.

The Bulls prevented a commanding 3–0 lead by the Wizards in Game 3 with a 100–97 victory. The Bulls were led by Mike Dunleavy Jr. who scored 35 points including 8 three-pointers. Meanwhile, the Wizards suffered a big blow in Game 4 when Nenê was suspended after he had an altercation with Bulls' guard Jimmy Butler. In Game 4, the Wizards had no problem defeating the Bulls without Nenê, leading from start to finish en route to a 98–89 win to take a commanding 3–1 lead. In Game 5, the Wizards closed out their upset of the Bulls, 75–69, in a low-scoring affair as they won the series 4–1 to advance to the second round for the first time since 2005.

Regular-season series

Washington won 2–1 in the regular-season series

January 13, 2014

Recap

Washington Wizards 102, Chicago Bulls 88

United Center, Chicago, Illinois

January 17, 2014

Recap

Chicago Bulls 93, Washington Wizards 96

Verizon Center, Washington, D.C.

April 5, 2014

Recap

Chicago Bulls 96, Washington Wizards 78

Verizon Center, Washington, D.C.

This was the third playoff meeting between these two teams, with each team winning one series apiece.

Previous playoff series
Tied 1–1 in all-time playoff series

1997

Chicago Bulls 3, Washington Bullets 0

1997 Eastern Conference First Round

2005

Chicago Bulls 2, Washington Wizards 4

2005 Eastern Conference First Round

=== Western Conference first round ===
==== (1) San Antonio Spurs vs. (8) Dallas Mavericks ====
TNT

April 20
1:00 pm

Boxscore

Dallas Mavericks 85, San Antonio Spurs 90
Scoring by quarter: 12–21, 32–22, 21–22, 20–25
Pts: Devin Harris 19; Rebs: Nowitzki, Dalembert 8 each Asts: Devin Harris 5	Pts: Tim Duncan 27; Rebs: Tiago Splitter 11; Asts: Tony Parker 6
San Antonio leads series, 1–0

AT&T Center, San Antonio
Attendance: 18,581
Referees: Joe Crawford, Bennie Adams, Bill Spooner

NBATV

April 23
8:00 pm

Boxscore

Dallas Mavericks 113, San Antonio Spurs 92
Scoring by quarter: 24–23, 32–28, 32–24, 25–17
Pts: Monta Ellis 21; Rebs: Dalembert, Blair 7 each Asts: Calderón, Harris 5 each	Pts: Manu Ginóbili 27; Rebs: Tim Duncan 7 Asts: Manu Ginóbili 4
Series tied, 1–1

AT&T Center, San Antonio
Attendance: 18,581
Referees: Danny Crawford, Michael Smith, Derrick Stafford

TNT

April 26
4:30 pm

Boxscore

San Antonio Spurs 108, Dallas Mavericks 109
Scoring by quarter: 34–27, 20–32, 20–18, 34–32
Pts: Tim Duncan 22; Rebs: Tiago Splitter 13; Asts: Tony Parker 6	Pts: Monta Ellis 29; Rebs: Samuel Dalembert 10; Asts: José Calderón 9
Dallas leads series, 2–1

American Airlines Center, Dallas
Attendance: 20,636
Referees: Tony Brothers, Leroy Richardson, Tom Washington

TNT

April 28
9:30 pm

Boxscore

San Antonio Spurs 93, Dallas Mavericks 89
Scoring by quarter: 18–23, 32–13, 23–29, 20–24
Pts: Manu Ginóbili 23; Rebs: Leonard, Splitter 12 each Asts: Manu Ginóbili 5	Pts: Monta Ellis 20; Rebs: Samuel Dalembert 15; Asts: Vince Carter 5
Series tied, 2–2

American Airlines Center, Dallas
Attendance: 20,796
Referees: Scott Foster, Bill Kennedy, Pat Fraher

TNT

April 30
7:00 pm

Boxscore

Dallas Mavericks 103, San Antonio Spurs 109
Scoring by quarter: 26–27, 23–31, 22–21, 32–30
Pts: Vince Carter 28; Rebs: Dirk Nowitzki 15; Asts: Monta Ellis 6	Pts: Tony Parker 23; Rebs: Splitter, Duncan 12 each Asts: Boris Diaw 6
San Antonio leads series, 3–2

AT&T Center, San Antonio
Attendance: 18,581
Referees: Mike Callahan, Ron Garretson, Eric Lewis

ESPN

May 2
8:00 pm

Boxscore

San Antonio Spurs 111, Dallas Mavericks 113
Scoring by quarter: 26–34, 26–24, 29–18, 30–37
Pts: Tony Parker 22; Rebs: Tim Duncan 9 Asts: Tony Parker 6	Pts: Monta Ellis 29; Rebs: DeJuan Blair 14; Asts: José Calderón 6
Series tied, 3–3

American Airlines Center, Dallas
Attendance: 20,799
Referees: James Capers, Jason Phillips, Zach Zarba

ABC

May 4
3:30 pm

Boxscore

Dallas Mavericks 96, San Antonio Spurs 119
Scoring by quarter: 23–35, 23–33, 22–26, 28–25
Pts: Dirk Nowitzki 22; Rebs: Dirk Nowitzki 9 Asts: Calderón, Carter 4 each	Pts: Tony Parker 32; Rebs: Tim Duncan 8 Asts: Ginóbili, Diaw 5 each
San Antonio wins series, 4–3

AT&T Center, San Antonio
Attendance: 18,581
Referees: Monty McCutchen, Marc Davis, Bennett Salvatore

Despite the fact that the Spurs swept the season series against the Mavericks, the series was expected to be close because of the rivalry that the two teams have. In Game 1, the Spurs suffered a big blow as Tim Duncan limped off the floor in the third quarter. As he watched the Mavs take a 10-point lead in the fourth quarter, he returned in the game to lead the Spurs to a 90–85 victory and a 1–0 series lead. The Mavs proceeded to build another big lead in Game 2 but unlike in Game 1, they never looked back as they blew out the Spurs to tie the series at 1. Game 3 was close until the final minute. With the Mavs down by 2 with 1.7 seconds remaining, Vince Carter hit the game-winning three-pointer with no time left on the clock to give the Mavs a 1-point win and a surprising 2–1 series lead. Game 4 saw the Spurs erect a 20-point lead before the Mavs rallied back. With the Mavs down by 2 once again, Monta Ellis missed a potential game-tying layup as the Spurs tied the series at 2 and regained the home-court advantage.

The Mavs were dealt a big blow when DeJuan Blair was suspended for Game 5 after kicking Tiago Splitter in the head. In Game 5, the Spurs led from start to finish to win, 109–103, and to take a crucial 3–2 series lead. However, Ellis and Nowitzki led the Mavs to a series-tying 113–111 win in Game 6 to force a decisive game. The Spurs had a chance to force overtime or to win the series after Ellis threw an errant pass but they were not able to get a shot off in time. In Game 7, Tony Parker scored 32 points as the Spurs blew out the Mavs, 119–96, to win the series, 4–3.

Regular-season series

San Antonio won 4–0 in the regular-season series

December 26, 2013

Recap

San Antonio Spurs 116, Dallas Mavericks 107

American Airlines Center, Dallas

January 8, 2014

Recap

Dallas Mavericks 90, San Antonio Spurs 112

AT&T Center, San Antonio

March 2, 2014

Recap

Dallas Mavericks 106, San Antonio Spurs 112

AT&T Center, San Antonio

April 10, 2014

Recap

San Antonio Spurs 109, Dallas Mavericks 100

American Airlines Center, Dallas

This was the sixth playoff meeting between these two teams, with the Spurs winning three of the first five meetings.

Previous playoff series
San Antonio leads 3–2 in all-time playoff series

2001

Dallas Mavericks 1, San Antonio Spurs 4

2001 Western Conference Semifinals

2003

Dallas Mavericks 2, San Antonio Spurs 4

2003 Western Conference Finals

2006

Dallas Mavericks 4, San Antonio Spurs 3

2006 Western Conference Semifinals

2009

Dallas Mavericks 4, San Antonio Spurs 1

2009 Western Conference First Round

2010

Dallas Mavericks 2, San Antonio Spurs 4

2010 Western Conference First Round

==== (2) Oklahoma City Thunder vs. (7) Memphis Grizzlies ====
ESPN

April 19
9:30 pm

Boxscore

Memphis Grizzlies 86, Oklahoma City Thunder 100
Scoring by quarter: 16–29, 18–27, 31–13, 21–31
Pts: Zach Randolph 21; Rebs: Zach Randolph 11; Asts: Mike Conley Jr. 11	Pts: Kevin Durant 33; Rebs: Russell Westbrook 10; Asts: Kevin Durant 7
Oklahoma City leads series, 1–0

Chesapeake Energy Arena, Oklahoma City, Oklahoma
Attendance: 18,203
Referees: Tony Brothers, Tom Washington, David Guthrie

TNT

April 21
8:00 pm

Boxscore

Memphis Grizzlies 111, Oklahoma City Thunder 105 (OT)
Scoring by quarter: 24–16, 22–27, 22–22, 31–34, Overtime: 12–6
Pts: Zach Randolph 25; Rebs: Tony Allen 8 Asts: Mike Conley Jr. 12	Pts: Kevin Durant 36; Rebs: Ibaka, Durant 11 each Asts: Russell Westbrook 8
Series tied, 1–1

Chesapeake Energy Arena, Oklahoma City, Oklahoma
Attendance: 18,203
Referees: Mike Callahan, Ron Garretson, Sean Wright

TNT

April 24
8:00 pm

Boxscore

Oklahoma City Thunder 95, Memphis Grizzlies 98 (OT)
Scoring by quarter: 18–24, 18–20, 25–27, 24–14, Overtime: 10–13
Pts: Durant, Westbrook 30 each Rebs: Russell Westbrook 13; Asts: Durant, Jackson 3 each	Pts: Mike Conley Jr. 20; Rebs: Zach Randolph 10; Asts: Zach Randolph 6
Memphis leads series, 2–1

FedExForum, Memphis, Tennessee
Attendance: 18,119
Referees: Monty McCutchen, John Goble, David Jones

ESPN

April 26
9:30 pm

Boxscore

Oklahoma City Thunder 92, Memphis Grizzlies 89 (OT)
Scoring by quarter: 15–18, 27–17, 22–17, 16–28, Overtime: 12–9
Pts: Reggie Jackson 32; Rebs: Serge Ibaka 14; Asts: Russell Westbrook 7	Pts: Marc Gasol 23; Rebs: Tony Allen 13; Asts: Mike Conley Jr. 10
Series tied, 2–2

FedExForum, Memphis, Tennessee
Attendance: 18,119
Referees: Danny Crawford, Marc Davis, Bennett Salvatore

NBATV

April 29
9:00 pm

Boxscore

Memphis Grizzlies 100, Oklahoma City Thunder 99 (OT)
Scoring by quarter: 30–25, 25–18, 21–27, 14–20, Overtime: 10–9
Pts: Mike Miller 21; Rebs: Marc Gasol 15; Asts: Gasol, Lee, Conley 4 each	Pts: Russell Westbrook 30; Rebs: Serge Ibaka 11; Asts: Russell Westbrook 13
Memphis leads series, 3–2

Chesapeake Energy Arena, Oklahoma City, Oklahoma
Attendance: 18,203
Referees: Joe Crawford, Derrick Stafford, Bill Spooner

TNT

May 1
8:00 pm

Boxscore

Oklahoma City Thunder 104, Memphis Grizzlies 84
Scoring by quarter: 25–17, 31–24, 26–20, 22–23
Pts: Kevin Durant 36; Rebs: Kevin Durant 10; Asts: Russell Westbrook 5	Pts: Marc Gasol 17; Rebs: Zach Randolph 8 Asts: Mike Conley Jr. 6
Series tied, 3–3

FedExForum, Memphis, Tennessee
Attendance: 18,119
Referees: Ken Mauer, Ed Malloy, Rodney Mott

TNT

May 3
8:00 pm

Boxscore

Memphis Grizzlies 109, Oklahoma City Thunder 120
Scoring by quarter: 36–27, 22–34, 23–33, 28–26
Pts: Marc Gasol 24; Rebs: Mike Conley Jr. 5 Asts: Mike Conley Jr. 9	Pts: Kevin Durant 33; Rebs: Russell Westbrook 10; Asts: Russell Westbrook 16
Oklahoma City wins series, 4–3

Chesapeake Energy Arena, Oklahoma City, Oklahoma
Attendance: 18,203
Referees: Scott Foster, John Goble, Tom Washington

In Game 1, the Thunder held the Grizzlies to a 36 percent field goal shooting and led by as many as 25 before holding on to a 100–86 win and a 1–0 series lead. The next four games of the series all went to overtime, breaking an NBA record for most number of OT games in a series. In Game 2, the Grizzlies led by 5 with 18 seconds remaining when Kevin Durant hit a miraculous 4-point play and after a made free throw by Mike Conley Jr., Kendrick Perkins made a putback at the buzzer to force overtime. However, the Grizzlies held on in OT and tied the series at 1 game apiece. The Grizzlies led by 17 in the fourth quarter before the Thunder came roaring back. The Thunder trailed by 4 in the final minute when Westbrook hit a 4-point play that eventually forced overtime. However, the Grizzlies held off the Thunder for a 2–1 series lead.

In Game 4, with Durant and Westbrook struggling offensively, Reggie Jackson scored a career-high 32 points that helped the Thunder take a 14-point lead before the Grizzlies stormed back. With the Grizzlies leading by 5 in the final minute, Jackson hit a 3 and a layup to force overtime. The Grizzlies still had a chance to force a second overtime but Conley's three missed as the Thunder tied the series at 2. Game 5 saw the Grizzlies erect a 20-point lead in the third quarter, but the Thunder rallied back. With the Thunder trailing by 2, Westbrook came up with a steal and a dunk to force another overtime. The Thunder had a chance to win the game in overtime but Durant's three missed. Luckily, Serge Ibaka made a putback but replays showed that the ball left Ibaka's hands after the buzzer sounded, giving the Grizzlies a 3–2 series lead. Knowing that their season could once again end in Grizzlies' hands if they lost another game, the Thunder blew out the Grizzlies in Game 6, forcing a decisive game. Prior to Game 7, Zach Randolph was suspended for punching Steven Adams while jogging back in transition in Game 6. Though putting up a valiant effort without their leading scorer, the Grizzlies ultimately succumbed to the Thunder who managed to avenge their loss from the year before.

Regular-season series

Oklahoma City won 3–1 in the regular-season series

December 11, 2013

Recap

Oklahoma City Thunder 116, Memphis Grizzlies 100

FedExForum, Memphis, Tennessee

January 14, 2014

Recap

Oklahoma City Thunder 87, Memphis Grizzlies 90

FedExForum, Memphis, Tennessee

February 3, 2014

Recap

Memphis Grizzlies 77, Oklahoma City Thunder 86

Chesapeake Energy Arena, Oklahoma City, Oklahoma

February 28, 2014

Recap

Memphis Grizzlies 107, Oklahoma City Thunder 113

Chesapeake Energy Arena, Oklahoma City, Oklahoma

This was the third playoff meeting between these two teams, with each team winning one series apiece.

Previous playoff series
Tied 1–1 in all-time playoff series

2011

Memphis Grizzlies 3, Oklahoma City Thunder 4

2011 Western Conference Semifinals

2013

Memphis Grizzlies 4, Oklahoma City Thunder 1

2013 Western Conference Semifinals

- This is the most recent playoff series between the Thunder & Grizzlies until 2020.

==== (3) Los Angeles Clippers vs. (6) Golden State Warriors ====
ABC

April 19
3:30 pm

Boxscore

Golden State Warriors 109, Los Angeles Clippers 105
Scoring by quarter: 24–29, 28–23, 35–27, 22–26
Pts: Klay Thompson 22; Rebs: David Lee 13; Asts: Stephen Curry 7	Pts: Chris Paul 28; Rebs: DeAndre Jordan 14; Asts: Chris Paul 8
Golden State leads series, 1–0

Staples Center, Los Angeles
Attendance: 19,339
Referees: Mike Callahan, Ron Garretson, Sean Wright

TNT

April 21
10:30 pm

Boxscore

Golden State Warriors 98, Los Angeles Clippers 138
Scoring by quarter: 20–31, 21–36, 32–38, 25–33
Pts: Stephen Curry 24; Rebs: Barnes, Speights 6 each Asts: Stephen Curry 8	Pts: Blake Griffin 35; Rebs: DeAndre Jordan 9 Asts: Paul, Collison 10 each
Series tied, 1–1

Staples Center, Los Angeles
Attendance: 19,570
Referees: Tony Brothers, David Guthrie, Rodney Mott

TNT

April 24
10:30 pm

Boxscore

Los Angeles Clippers 98, Golden State Warriors 96
Scoring by quarter: 24–21, 22–22, 29–21, 23–32
Pts: Blake Griffin 32; Rebs: DeAndre Jordan 22; Asts: Chris Paul 10	Pts: Klay Thompson 26; Rebs: Draymond Green 11; Asts: Stephen Curry 15
LA Clippers lead series, 2–1

Oracle Arena, Oakland, California
Attendance: 19,596
Referees: Ken Mauer, Eric Lewis, Ed Malloy

ABC

April 27
3:30 pm

Boxscore

Los Angeles Clippers 97, Golden State Warriors 118
Scoring by quarter: 24–39, 24–27, 23–23, 26–29
Pts: Jamal Crawford 26; Rebs: Griffin, Jordan 6 each Asts: Chris Paul 6	Pts: Stephen Curry 33; Rebs: Stephen Curry 7 Asts: Andre Iguodala 9
Series tied, 2–2

Oracle Arena, Oakland, California
Attendance: 19,596
Referees: Joe Crawford, Sean Corbin, Derrick Stafford

TNT

April 29
10:30 pm

Boxscore

Golden State Warriors 103, Los Angeles Clippers 113
Scoring by quarter: 21–31, 29–24, 22–22, 31–36
Pts: Klay Thompson 21; Rebs: Draymond Green 11; Asts: Andre Iguodala 8	Pts: DeAndre Jordan 25; Rebs: DeAndre Jordan 18; Asts: Chris Paul 7
LA Clippers lead series, 3–2

Staples Center, Los Angeles
Attendance: 19,657
Referees: James Capers, Jason Phillips, Zach Zarba

TNT

May 1
10:30 pm

Boxscore

Los Angeles Clippers 99, Golden State Warriors 100
Scoring by quarter: 25–25, 26–23, 16–22, 32–30
Pts: Jamal Crawford 19; Rebs: DeAndre Jordan 19; Asts: Chris Paul 8	Pts: Stephen Curry 24; Rebs: Draymond Green 14; Asts: Stephen Curry 9
Series tied, 3–3

Oracle Arena, Oakland, California
Attendance: 19,596
Referees: Monty McCutchen, John Goble, Bill Spooner

TNT

May 3
10:30 pm

Boxscore

Golden State Warriors 121, Los Angeles Clippers 126
Scoring by quarter: 32–22, 32–34, 20–31, 37–39
Pts: Stephen Curry 33; Rebs: David Lee 13; Asts: Stephen Curry 9	Pts: Blake Griffin 24; Rebs: DeAndre Jordan 18; Asts: Chris Paul 14
LA Clippers win series, 4–3

Staples Center, Los Angeles
Attendance: 19,543
Referees: Ken Mauer, David Jones, Ed Malloy

The series was seen as one of the most dramatic first round series in the NBA, especially after the controversy surrounding Clippers' owner Donald Sterling's racist comments arose. In Game 1, with the Warriors up by 3 in the final seconds, the Clippers had a chance to force overtime but Darren Collison stepped out of bounds after running down the loose ball. Klay Thompson sealed a 1–0 series lead for the Warriors by splitting his free throws as the Warriors took away home court advantage. The Clippers tied the series at 1 after blowing out the Warriors in Game 2 by 40 to set a franchise record for the largest margin of victory in a postseason game. In Game 3, the Warriors rallied back from an 18-point deficit in the third quarter. Down by 2, the Warriors had a chance to win but Stephen Curry's three missed as the Clippers took back home court advantage and a 2–1 lead in the series.

A day after the Clippers' Game 3 win, controversy regarding Clippers' owner Donald Sterling's racist comments arose. As a result, the Clippers silently protested in Game 4 by shedding their warm-up jerseys and going through the pregame routine with their red shirts on inside out. However, Curry scored 33 points including seven three-pointers as the Warriors blew out the Clippers to tie the series at 2. Before Game 5, the NBA handed out a lifetime suspension to Donald Sterling. This appeared to have a positive effect on the Clippers, who won a hotly contested Game 5 in front of their home crowd to lead the series, 3–2. DeAndre Jordan led the Clippers in the game with 25 points, 18 rebounds and 4 blocks to become the first player since Tim Duncan in 2008 to have such stats in a playoff game.

The Warriors were able to stave off elimination with a 100–99 win in Game 6 to force a decisive game. The Clippers had many chances to chip into the Warriors' 4-point lead in the final minute, but they missed their chances and Matt Barnes' three-pointer was already too late. In Game 7, the Warriors controlled the first quarter, but the Clippers eventually came back. In the final quarter, it was the Clippers who hit the biggest shots as they took Game 7 to advance to the semifinals.

Regular-season series
Tied 2–2 in the regular-season series

October 31, 2013

Recap

Golden State Warriors 115, Los Angeles Clippers 126

Staples Center, Los Angeles

December 25, 2013

Recap

Los Angeles Clippers 103, Golden State Warriors 105

Oracle Arena, Oakland, California

January 30, 2014

Recap

Los Angeles Clippers 92, Golden State Warriors 111

Oracle Arena, Oakland, California

March 13, 2014

Recap

Golden State Warriors 98, Los Angeles Clippers 111

Staples Center, Los Angeles

This was the first playoff meeting between the Warriors and the Clippers.

==== (4) Houston Rockets vs. (5) Portland Trail Blazers ====
TNT

April 20
9:30 pm

Boxscore

Portland Trail Blazers 122, Houston Rockets 120 (OT)
Scoring by quarter: 27–20, 21–29, 25–30, 33–27, Overtime: 16–14
Pts: LaMarcus Aldridge 46; Rebs: LaMarcus Aldridge 18; Asts: Damian Lillard 5	Pts: Harden, Howard 27 each Rebs: Dwight Howard 15; Asts: James Harden 6
Portland leads series, 1–0

Toyota Center, Houston, Texas
Attendance: 18,240
Referees: Scott Foster, Bennett Salvatore, Derrick Stafford

TNT

April 23
9:30 pm

Boxscore

Portland Trail Blazers 112, Houston Rockets 105
Scoring by quarter: 23–31, 30–22, 30–24, 29–28
Pts: LaMarcus Aldridge 43; Rebs: Robin Lopez 10; Asts: Damian Lillard 11	Pts: Dwight Howard 32; Rebs: Dwight Howard 14; Asts: Jeremy Lin 5
Portland leads series, 2–0

Toyota Center, Houston, Texas
Attendance: 18,331
Referees: James Capers, Jason Phillips, Zach Zarba

ESPN

April 25
10:30 pm

Boxscore

Houston Rockets 121, Portland Trail Blazers 116 (OT)
Scoring by quarter: 35–24, 19–31, 27–23, 29–32, Overtime: 11–6
Pts: James Harden 37; Rebs: Dwight Howard 14; Asts: Harden, Lin 6 each	Pts: Damian Lillard 30; Rebs: LaMarcus Aldridge 10; Asts: Damian Lillard 6
Portland leads series, 2–1

Moda Center, Portland, Oregon
Attendance: 20,302
Referees: Joe Crawford, Sean Corbin, Bill Spooner

TNT

April 27
9:30 pm

Boxscore

Houston Rockets 120, Portland Trail Blazers 123 (OT)
Scoring by quarter: 29–23, 32–28, 23–28, 22–27, Overtime: 14–17
Pts: James Harden 28; Rebs: Dwight Howard 14; Asts: James Harden 6	Pts: LaMarcus Aldridge 29; Rebs: Robin Lopez 11; Asts: Damian Lillard 8
Portland leads series, 3–1

Moda Center, Portland, Oregon
Attendance: 20,246
Referees: Ken Mauer, Eric Lewis, Ed Malloy

TNT

April 30
9:30 pm

Boxscore

Portland Trail Blazers 98, Houston Rockets 108
Scoring by quarter: 27–30, 21–26, 29–26, 21–26
Pts: Wesley Matthews 27; Rebs: Lillard, Lopez, Aldridge 8 each Asts: Damian Lillard 7	Pts: Dwight Howard 22; Rebs: Omer Asik 15; Asts: James Harden 7
Portland leads series, 3–2

Toyota Center, Houston, Texas
Attendance: 18,230
Referees: Danny Crawford, David Jones, Michael Smith

ESPN

May 2
10:30 pm

Boxscore

Houston Rockets 98, Portland Trail Blazers 99
Scoring by quarter: 29–28, 29–28, 21–22, 19–21
Pts: James Harden 34; Rebs: Chandler Parsons 12; Asts: James Harden 6	Pts: LaMarcus Aldridge 30; Rebs: LaMarcus Aldridge 13; Asts: Nicolas Batum 7
Portland wins series, 4–2

Moda Center, Portland, Oregon
Attendance: 20,204
Referees: Mike Callahan, Ron Garretson, Bill Kennedy

The two teams faced off in the playoffs for the fourth time and the Blazers tried to defeat the Rockets after losing their previous three encounters. In Game 1, the Rockets held an 11-point lead with 4:30 remaining in the fourth quarter but the Blazers rallied to force overtime. It again appeared the Rockets had too large of a lead to overcome when they led by 6 in overtime but LaMarcus Aldridge hit a desperation three to spark an 8–0 run. The Rockets had a chance to win but James Harden missed a three-pointer as they took away home court advantage and a 1–0 series lead. Aldridge scored a career-high 46 points to lead the Blazers. In Game 2, the Rockets had no answers for Aldridge once again as he scored 43 points to give the Blazers a 112–105 win and a 2–0 series lead heading to the next two games in Portland. In Game 3, Nicolas Batum was able to force overtime with a 3 with 41 seconds remaining in regulation. In overtime, with the two teams tied at 116, seldom-used Troy Daniels hit a crucial 3-pointer. The Blazers had a chance to force overtime but Batum missed his three-pointer and Harden made two free throws to clinch the game. In Game 4, the two teams went to overtime again after Dwight Howard hit a dunk with 3 seconds remaining in regulation before Mo Williams missed a 3 at the buzzer. However, the Blazers had a 9–2 run in overtime to clinch a 3–1 series lead for the Blazers. The Rockets had a chance to tie the game but Wesley Matthews stole the ball.

Facing elimination in Game 5, the Rockets held Aldridge to 8 points as they lived to fight another day with a 108–98 win to trim the Blazers' series lead to 3–2. Game 6 was close in the final minute. It seemed that a Game 7 was inevitable when Chandler Parsons hit a reverse layup with 0.9 seconds remaining but the Rockets' hearts were broken when Damian Lillard hit a game-winning three-point shot at the horn to send Portland to the second round of the playoffs. The most recent person to hit a series-winning buzzer beater prior to Lillard was John Stockton, who hit the game-winning three-point shot against Houston in 1997 to advance to the Finals. With their win, Portland advanced to the second-round appearance for the first time since 2000, ending a 14-year drought which was the longest at the time.

Regular-season series

Houston won 3–1 in the regular-season series

November 5, 2013

Recap

Houston Rockets 116, Portland Trail Blazers 101

Moda Center, Portland, Oregon

December 12, 2013

Recap

Houston Rockets 104, Portland Trail Blazers 111

Moda Center, Portland, Oregon

January 20, 2014

Recap

Portland Trail Blazers 113, Houston Rockets 126

Toyota Center, Houston, Texas

March 9, 2014

Recap

Portland Trail Blazers 113, Houston Rockets 118 (OT)

Toyota Center, Houston, Texas

This was the fourth playoff meeting between these two teams, with the Rockets winning the first three meetings.

Previous playoff series
Houston leads 3–0 in all-time playoff series

1987

Houston Rockets 3, Portland Trail Blazers 1

1987 Western Conference First Round

1994

Houston Rockets 3, Portland Trail Blazers 1

1994 Western Conference First Round

2009

Houston Rockets 4, Portland Trail Blazers 2

2009 Western Conference First Round

== Conference semifinals ==
=== Eastern Conference semifinals ===
==== (1) Indiana Pacers vs. (5) Washington Wizards ====
TNT

May 5
7:00 pm

Boxscore

Washington Wizards 102, Indiana Pacers 96
Scoring by quarter: 28–15, 28–28, 13–19, 33–34
Pts: Bradley Beal 25; Rebs: Marcin Gortat 15; Asts: John Wall 9	Pts: Hill, George 18 each Rebs: David West 12; Asts: Paul George 5
Washington leads series, 1–0

Bankers Life Fieldhouse, Indianapolis
Attendance: 18,165
Referees: Scott Foster, David Guthrie, Bill Kennedy

TNT

May 7
7:00 pm

Boxscore

Washington Wizards 82, Indiana Pacers 86
Scoring by quarter: 23–23, 22–20, 15–22, 22–21
Pts: Marcin Gortat 21; Rebs: Marcin Gortat 11; Asts: John Wall 8	Pts: Roy Hibbert 28; Rebs: Roy Hibbert 9 Asts: Lance Stephenson 5
Series tied, 1–1

Bankers Life Fieldhouse, Indianapolis
Attendance: 18,165
Referees: James Capers, Marc Davis, Zach Zarba

ESPN

May 9
8:00 pm

Boxscore

Indiana Pacers 85, Washington Wizards 63
Scoring by quarter: 17–17, 17–16, 26–12, 25–18
Pts: Paul George 23; Rebs: Paul George 8 Asts: Hill, Stephenson 5 each	Pts: Bradley Beal 16; Rebs: Trevor Ariza 15; Asts: John Wall 6
Indiana leads series, 2–1

Verizon Center, Washington, D.C.
Attendance: 20,356
Referees: Tony Brothers, Eric Lewis, Tom Washington

TNT

May 11
8:00 pm

Boxscore

Indiana Pacers 95, Washington Wizards 92
Scoring by quarter: 27–26, 11–29, 33–17, 24–20
Pts: Paul George 39; Rebs: Paul George 12; Asts: David West 8	Pts: Bradley Beal 20; Rebs: Trevor Ariza 9 Asts: John Wall 7
Indiana leads series, 3–1

Verizon Center, Washington, D.C.
Attendance: 20,356
Referees: Joe Crawford, Bill Spooner, Derrick Stafford

TNT

May 13
7:00 pm

Boxscore

Washington Wizards 102, Indiana Pacers 79
Scoring by quarter: 25–19, 20–19, 31–14, 26–27
Pts: Marcin Gortat 31; Rebs: Marcin Gortat 16; Asts: Ariza, Wall 5 each	Pts: David West 17; Rebs: David West 6 Asts: Turner, Stephenson, Hibbert, West 3 each
Indiana leads series, 3–2

Bankers Life Fieldhouse, Indianapolis
Attendance: 18,165
Referees: Danny Crawford, Pat Fraher, Ron Garretson

ESPN

May 15
8:00 pm

Boxscore

Indiana Pacers 93, Washington Wizards 80
Scoring by quarter: 29–23, 23–17, 19–23, 22–17
Pts: David West 29; Rebs: Roy Hibbert 7 Asts: Lance Stephenson 8	Pts: Marcin Gortat 19; Rebs: Trevor Ariza 7 Asts: John Wall 9
Indiana wins series, 4–2

Verizon Center, Washington, D.C.
Attendance: 19,502
Referees: Mike Callahan, Sean Corbin, Marc Davis

Going to the Conference Semifinals, the Pacers came off a tough seven-game series against the Hawks while the Wizards were able to dispatch the Bulls in five games, giving them plenty of time to rest and prepare for the second round. In Game 1, the Wizards held a 13-point lead after one quarter and kept that momentum to take the series opener and the home court advantage away from the Pacers. Trevor Ariza led the Wizards' charge with 22 points including 6/6 from three-point land. After being criticized once again for having a 0-point and 0-rebound performance in Game 1, Roy Hibbert broke loose for 28 points as he led the Pacers to a series-tying 86–82 victory over the Wizards. In Game 3, the Pacers' early season form returned, holding the Wizards to only 63 points and 33 percent shooting as they blew them out to take a 2–1 series lead.

It looked as if the Wizards had Game 4 in hand when they led by 19 points early in the third quarter but the Pacers eventually came back. Trailing by 3 with 6 seconds remaining, the Wizards had a chance to force overtime but Ariza threw an errant pass, sealing the win and the 3–1 series lead for the Pacers. Paul George led the Pacers' comeback with 39 points including 28 in the second half. In Game 5, the Wizards responded by blowing out the Pacers, 102–79, with Marcin Gortat scoring 31 points and grabbing 16 rebounds. The Wizards held a 62–23 rebounding advantage in Game 5, the widest margin in a playoff game since 1985. However, David West led the Pacers with 29 points in Game 6 as the Pacers ended the Wizards' run with a 93–80 win as they advanced to the Eastern Conference Finals for the second straight year.

Regular-season series

Indiana won 2–1 in the regular-season series

November 29, 2013

Recap

Washington Wizards 73, Indiana Pacers 93

Bankers Life Fieldhouse, Indianapolis

January 10, 2014

Recap

Washington Wizards 66, Indiana Pacers 93

Bankers Life Fieldhouse, Indianapolis

March 28, 2014

Recap

Indiana Pacers 78, Washington Wizards 91

Verizon Center, Washington, D.C.

This was the first playoff meeting between the Pacers and the Wizards.

==== (2) Miami Heat vs. (6) Brooklyn Nets ====
TNT

May 6
7:00 pm

Boxscore

Brooklyn Nets 86, Miami Heat 107
Scoring by quarter: 20–22, 23–24, 23–33, 20–28
Pts: Johnson, Williams 17 each Rebs: Paul Pierce 6 Asts: Livingston, Williams 3 each	Pts: LeBron James 22; Rebs: Chris Bosh 11; Asts: Dwyane Wade 5
Miami leads series, 1–0

AmericanAirlines Arena, Miami
Attendance: 19,470
Referees: Mike Callahan, Ron Garretson, Sean Wright

ESPN2

May 8
7:00 pm

Boxscore

Brooklyn Nets 82, Miami Heat 94
Scoring by quarter: 21–15, 25–30, 21–24, 15–25
Pts: Mirza Teletović 20; Rebs: Kevin Garnett 12; Asts: Deron Williams 6	Pts: LeBron James 22; Rebs: Ray Allen 8 Asts: Dwyane Wade 7
Miami leads series, 2–0

AmericanAirlines Arena, Miami
Attendance: 19,639
Referees: Ken Mauer, Ed Malloy, Rodney Mott

ABC

May 10
8:00 pm

Boxscore

Miami Heat 90, Brooklyn Nets 104
Scoring by quarter: 30–29, 19–22, 14–26, 27–27
Pts: LeBron James 28; Rebs: LeBron James 8 Asts: LeBron James 5	Pts: Joe Johnson 19; Rebs: Andray Blatche 10; Asts: Deron Williams 11
Miami leads series, 2–1

Barclays Center, Brooklyn, New York City
Attendance: 17,732
Referees: Monty McCutchen, John Goble, David Jones

TNT

May 12
8:00 pm

Boxscore

Miami Heat 102, Brooklyn Nets 96
Scoring by quarter: 27–22, 29–27, 23–27, 23–20
Pts: LeBron James 49; Rebs: Ray Allen 7 Asts: Mario Chalmers 7	Pts: Joe Johnson 18; Rebs: Andray Blatche 8 Asts: Deron Williams 7
Miami leads series, 3–1

Barclays Center, Brooklyn, New York City
Attendance: 17,732
Referees: James Capers, Jason Phillips, Zach Zarba

TNT

May 14
7:00 pm

Boxscore

Brooklyn Nets 94, Miami Heat 96
Scoring by quarter: 22–23, 27–19, 26–24, 19–30
Pts: Joe Johnson 34; Rebs: Kevin Garnett 8 Asts: Deron Williams 4	Pts: LeBron James 29; Rebs: LeBron James 9 Asts: Mario Chalmers 7
Miami wins series, 4–1

AmericanAirlines Arena, Miami
Attendance: 19,615
Referees: Joe Crawford, Bill Spooner, Derrick Stafford

Despite the fact that the Nets swept the season series against the Heat, the series was expected to be close, with all their four regular season meetings going down to the wire. In Game 1, the Heat showed no signs of rust from their long rest, blowing out the Nets, 107–86, for their first victory against the Nets all season long and the 1–0 series lead. In Game 2, the game was close until the Heat pulled away in the fourth quarter, outscoring the Nets by 10 en route to a 94–82 win and the 2–0 series lead as they remained perfect in the postseason. The game was clinched when the Heat held the ball from the 3:39 mark to the 1:59 mark of the final quarter, grabbing three offensive rebounds until LeBron James made a layup to make it a 10-point game, essentially icing the game. Mirza Teletović had a breakout playoff game with 20 points including 6 three-pointers for the Nets in a losing effort. In Game 3, the Nets had a hot shooting performance from three-point range, hitting 15 three-pointers as the Nets defeated the Heat, 104–90, to deal the Heat their first loss of the postseason and to cut their series deficit to 2–1.

Game 4 was close throughout, but the Heat were victorious, 102–96, to take a commanding 3–1 series lead. James exploded for a Heat playoff franchise record 49 points on an efficient 16/24 shooting clip and Chris Bosh made a tie breaking three-pointer in the final minute to give the Heat the lead for good before Ray Allen and James clinched the game with 5 free throws. In Game 5, a series extension seemed likely when the Nets led by 8 points with 5 minutes remaining. However, they went scoreless for the next 4 1/2 minutes, allowing the Heat to make a 12–0 run capped by a three-pointer and two free throws by Allen to take the lead for good. The Nets had a chance to tie after a Joe Johnson three-pointer and a split from the free throw line by James but Johnson wasn't able to get a shot off, giving the Heat the win as they advanced to their fourth straight Eastern Conference Finals appearance.

Regular-season series

Brooklyn won 4–0 in the regular-season series

November 1, 2013

Recap

Miami Heat 100, Brooklyn Nets 101

Barclays Center, Brooklyn, New York City

January 10, 2014

Recap

Miami Heat 95, Brooklyn Nets 104 (2OT)

Barclays Center, Brooklyn, New York City

March 12, 2014

Recap

Brooklyn Nets 96, Miami Heat 95

AmericanAirlines Arena, Miami

April 8, 2014

Recap

Brooklyn Nets 88, Miami Heat 87

AmericanAirlines Arena, Miami

This was the third playoff meeting between these two teams, with the Heat winning the first two meetings.

Previous playoff series
Miami leads 2–0 in all-time playoff series

2005

Miami Heat 4, New Jersey Nets 0

2005 Eastern Conference First Round

2006

Miami Heat 4, New Jersey Nets 1

2006 Eastern Conference Semifinals

=== Western Conference semifinals ===
==== (1) San Antonio Spurs vs. (5) Portland Trail Blazers ====
TNT

May 6
9:30 pm

Boxscore

Portland Trail Blazers 92, San Antonio Spurs 116
Scoring by quarter: 16–29, 23–36, 26–25, 27–26
Pts: LaMarcus Aldridge 32; Rebs: LaMarcus Aldridge 14; Asts: Mo Williams 4	Pts: Tony Parker 33; Rebs: Tim Duncan 11; Asts: Tony Parker 9
San Antonio leads series, 1–0

AT&T Center, San Antonio
Attendance: 18,581
Referees: Tony Brothers, Tony Brown, Tom Washington

ESPN 2

May 8
9:30 pm

Boxscore

Portland Trail Blazers 97, San Antonio Spurs 114
Scoring by quarter: 26–29, 25–41, 20–17, 26–27
Pts: Nicolas Batum 21; Rebs: LaMarcus Aldridge 10; Asts: Damian Lillard 5	Pts: Kawhi Leonard 20; Rebs: Tiago Splitter 10; Asts: Tony Parker 10
San Antonio leads series, 2–0

AT&T Center, San Antonio
Attendance: 18,581
Referees: Joe Crawford, Bill Spooner, Derrick Stafford

ESPN

May 10
10:30 pm

Boxscore

San Antonio Spurs 118, Portland Trail Blazers 103
Scoring by quarter: 28–18, 32–22, 23–29, 35–34
Pts: Tony Parker 29; Rebs: Kawhi Leonard 10; Asts: Tony Parker 6	Pts: Wesley Matthews 22; Rebs: LaMarcus Aldridge 12; Asts: Damian Lillard 9
San Antonio leads series, 3–0

Moda Center, Portland, Oregon
Attendance: 20,321
Referees: Danny Crawford, Marc Davis, Bennett Salvatore

TNT

May 12
10:30 pm

Boxscore

San Antonio Spurs 92, Portland Trail Blazers 103
Scoring by quarter: 24–29, 24–21, 20–35, 24–18
Pts: Duncan, Diaw 12 each Rebs: Leonard, Belinelli, Baynes 7 each Asts: Kawhi Leonard 3	Pts: Damian Lillard 25; Rebs: Nicolas Batum 14; Asts: Nicolas Batum 8
San Antonio leads series, 3–1

Moda Center, Portland, Oregon
Attendance: 20,141
Referees: Monty McCutchen, John Goble, Ed Malloy

TNT

May 14
9:30 pm

Boxscore

Portland Trail Blazers 82, San Antonio Spurs 104
Scoring by quarter: 19–19, 25–32, 19–26, 19–27
Pts: LaMarcus Aldridge 21; Rebs: Nicolas Batum 12; Asts: Damian Lillard 10	Pts: Green, Leonard 22 each Rebs: Danny Green 9 Asts: Tiago Splitter 7
San Antonio wins series, 4–1

AT&T Center, San Antonio
Attendance: 18,581
Referees: Ken Mauer, David Guthrie, Jason Phillips

The Spurs and the Blazers were coming off two tough first round series. The Spurs came off a tough seven-game series against the Mavericks while Blazers came off a dramatic first round series against the Rockets where Damian Lillard finished off the Rockets with a buzzer-beating three-pointer. In Game 1, the Spurs' experience paid off against the young Blazers, blowing them out in Game 1 to take the series opener. Tony Parker led the Spurs with 33 points in Game 1. Game 2 was more of the same, with the Spurs pulling away in the second quarter to blow out the Blazers once again as they took a 2–0 lead. They were able to hold the duo of LaMarcus Aldridge and Lillard to a combined 14/43 shooting. With the series shifting to Portland, the Blazers tried to close in on the Spurs' series lead but they were blown out for the third consecutive time as they fell behind 0–3 in the series. No NBA team has ever come back to win a series after being down 0–3.

In Game 4, the Blazers finally won against the Spurs in the series, outscoring the Spurs 35–20 in the third quarter en route to a 103–92 win to cut their series deficit to 3–1. However, the Spurs were able to finish off the Blazers in Game 5 with another blowout win, sending them to the Western Conference Finals for the third consecutive year.

Regular-season series

Tied 2–2 in the regular-season series

November 2, 2013

Recap

San Antonio Spurs 105, Portland Trail Blazers 115

Moda Center, Portland, Oregon

January 17, 2014

Recap

Portland Trail Blazers 109, San Antonio Spurs 100

AT&T Center, San Antonio

February 19, 2014

Recap

San Antonio Spurs 111, Portland Trail Blazers 109

Moda Center, Portland, Oregon

March 12, 2014

Recap

Portland Trail Blazers 90, San Antonio Spurs 103

AT&T Center, San Antonio

This was the fourth playoff meeting between these two teams, with the Spurs winning two of the first three meetings.

Previous playoff series
San Antonio leads 2–1 in all-time playoff series

1990

Portland Trail Blazers 4, San Antonio Spurs 3

1990 Western Conference Semifinals

1993

Portland Trail Blazers 1, San Antonio Spurs 3

1993 Western Conference First Round

1999

Portland Trail Blazers 0, San Antonio Spurs 4

1999 Western Conference Finals

- This is the most recent playoff series between the Spurs & Trail Blazers until 2026.

==== (2) Oklahoma City Thunder vs. (3) Los Angeles Clippers ====
TNT

May 5
9:30 pm

Boxscore

Los Angeles Clippers 122, Oklahoma City Thunder 105
Scoring by quarter: 39–25, 30–27, 35–26, 18–27
Pts: Chris Paul 32; Rebs: Granger, Griffin, Jordan 5 each Asts: Chris Paul 10	Pts: Russell Westbrook 29; Rebs: Butler, Ibaka, Lamb 6 each Asts: Reggie Jackson 5
LA Clippers lead series, 1–0

Chesapeake Energy Arena, Oklahoma City, Oklahoma
Attendance: 18,203
Referees: Danny Crawford, Jason Phillips, Michael Smith

TNT

May 7
9:30 pm

Boxscore

Los Angeles Clippers 101, Oklahoma City Thunder 112
Scoring by quarter: 28–37, 28–24, 21–33, 24–18
Pts: JJ Redick 18; Rebs: DeAndre Jordan 8 Asts: Chris Paul 11	Pts: Kevin Durant 32; Rebs: Kevin Durant 12; Asts: Russell Westbrook 10
Series tied, 1–1

Chesapeake Energy Arena, Oklahoma City, Oklahoma
Attendance: 18,203
Referees: Monty McCutchen, Pat Fraher, David Jones

ESPN

May 9
10:30 pm

Boxscore

Oklahoma City Thunder 118, Los Angeles Clippers 112
Scoring by quarter: 29–33, 32–30, 25–27, 32–22
Pts: Kevin Durant 36; Rebs: Steven Adams 9 Asts: Russell Westbrook 13	Pts: Blake Griffin 34; Rebs: DeAndre Jordan 11; Asts: Chris Paul 16
Oklahoma City leads series, 2–1

Staples Center, Los Angeles
Attendance: 19,530
Referees: Scott Foster, Sean Corbin, Bill Kennedy

ABC

May 11
3:30 pm

Boxscore

Oklahoma City Thunder 99, Los Angeles Clippers 101
Scoring by quarter: 32–15, 25–31, 18–17, 24–38
Pts: Kevin Durant 40; Rebs: Kevin Durant 7 Asts: Russell Westbrook 8	Pts: Blake Griffin 25; Rebs: DeAndre Jordan 14; Asts: Chris Paul 10
Series tied, 2–2

Staples Center, Los Angeles
Attendance: 19,365
Referees: Mike Callahan, Ron Garretson, Rodney Mott

TNT

May 13
9:30 pm

Boxscore

Los Angeles Clippers 104, Oklahoma City Thunder 105
Scoring by quarter: 34–25, 24–27, 28–28, 18–25
Pts: Blake Griffin 24; Rebs: Blake Griffin 17; Asts: Chris Paul 14	Pts: Russell Westbrook 38; Rebs: Kevin Durant 10; Asts: Russell Westbrook 6
Oklahoma City leads series, 3–2

Chesapeake Energy Arena, Oklahoma City, Oklahoma
Attendance: 18,203
Referees: Tony Brothers, Bennett Salvatore, Tom Washington

ESPN

May 15
10:30 pm

Boxscore

Oklahoma City Thunder 104, Los Angeles Clippers 98
Scoring by quarter: 16–30, 26–20, 30–22, 32–26
Pts: Kevin Durant 39; Rebs: Kevin Durant 16; Asts: Russell Westbrook 12	Pts: Chris Paul 25; Rebs: DeAndre Jordan 15; Asts: Chris Paul 11
Oklahoma City wins series, 4–2

Staples Center, Los Angeles
Attendance: 19,565
Referees: Monty McCutchen, James Capers, Ed Malloy

The Thunder and the Clippers were both coming off tough seven-game series against the Grizzlies and Warriors, respectively. The series was expected to be close with the two teams tied in their regular season series. In Game 1, the Clippers easily took home court advantage away from the Thunder, blowing them out, 122–105, and taking a 1–0 series lead. Chris Paul led the Clippers with 32 points including a career-high eight three-pointers. Game 2 was different, with Paul held to just two three-pointers as the Thunder took Game 2 to tie the series at 1. Russell Westbrook had a triple-double with 31 points, 10 rebounds and 10 assists. In Game 3, Serge Ibaka gave a big boost to the Thunder with 20 points as the Thunder took back home court advantage with a 118–112 victory to take a 2–1 series lead. Game 4 saw the Thunder build a big 22-point lead before the Clippers closed in on the Thunder. Darren Collison gave the Clippers the lead for good by hitting a layup with a minute remaining. The Thunder had a chance to win, but Westbrook's three-point shot missed as the Clippers tied the series at 2.

In Game 5, the Clippers built an early 15-point lead, but the Thunder came back. The Clippers still led by 13 with 4 minutes remaining, but the Thunder relentlessly closed in. It seemed like the Clippers had the game in hand when they led by 7 points with 49 seconds remaining, but the Thunder closed the game on an 8–0 run, courtesy of a three-pointer and layup by Kevin Durant and three free throws by Westbrook. The Clippers had a chance to win, but Paul committed a turnover, sealing the 3–2 lead for the Thunder. Game 5 also ended in controversy after a questionable out-of-bounds call with 11 seconds remaining. The referees ruled that the ball went off the Clippers' Matt Barnes, giving the Thunder possession with 11.3 seconds to play and setting up Westbrook's game-winning free throws. Although replays showed that the ball went off Oklahoma City's Reggie Jackson, the officials awarded the ball to the Thunder. After review, the play stood. In Game 6, the Clippers built another double-digit lead, but the Thunder eventually came back as they took the series in 6 games. Durant had 39 points for the Thunder, who advanced to the Western Conference Finals for the third time in four years.

Regular-season series

Tied 2–2 in the regular-season series

November 13, 2013

Recap

Oklahoma City Thunder 103, Los Angeles Clippers 111

Staples Center, Los Angeles

November 21, 2013

Recap

Los Angeles Clippers 91, Oklahoma City Thunder 105

Chesapeake Energy Arena, Oklahoma City, Oklahoma

February 23, 2014

Recap

Los Angeles Clippers 125, Oklahoma City Thunder 117

Chesapeake Energy Arena, Oklahoma City, Oklahoma

April 9, 2014

Recap

Oklahoma City Thunder 107, Los Angeles Clippers 101

Staples Center, Los Angeles

This was the first playoff meeting between the Clippers and the Thunder.

== Conference finals ==
=== Eastern Conference finals ===
==== (1) Indiana Pacers vs. (2) Miami Heat ====
ABC

May 18
3:30 pm

Boxscore

Miami Heat 96, Indiana Pacers 107
Scoring by quarter: 24–30, 21–25, 25–28, 26–24
Pts: Dwyane Wade 27; Rebs: LeBron James 10; Asts: James, Chalmers 5 each	Pts: Paul George 24; Rebs: Roy Hibbert 9 Asts: Lance Stephenson 8
Indiana leads series, 1–0

Bankers Life Fieldhouse, Indianapolis
Attendance: 18,165
Referees: Scott Foster, Bill Kennedy, Bill Spooner

ESPN

May 20
8:30 pm

Boxscore

Miami Heat 87, Indiana Pacers 83
Scoring by quarter: 20–21, 21–16, 21–26, 25–20
Pts: Dwyane Wade 23; Rebs: Chris Andersen 12; Asts: LeBron James 6	Pts: Lance Stephenson 25; Rebs: Roy Hibbert 13; Asts: Lance Stephenson 7
Series tied, 1–1

Bankers Life Fieldhouse, Indianapolis
Attendance: 18,165
Referees: Joe Crawford, Mike Callahan, John Goble

ESPN

May 24
8:30 pm

Boxscore

Indiana Pacers 87, Miami Heat 99
Scoring by quarter: 21–14, 21–24, 22–33, 23–28
Pts: Paul George 17; Rebs: Lance Stephenson 11; Asts: Lance Stephenson 5	Pts: LeBron James 26; Rebs: Chris Andersen 7 Asts: LeBron James 7
Miami leads series, 2–1

AmericanAirlines Arena, Miami
Attendance: 20,025
Referees: Monty McCutchen, Tony Brothers, Zach Zarba

ESPN

May 26
8:30 pm

Boxscore

Indiana Pacers 90, Miami Heat 102
Scoring by quarter: 19–27, 25–22, 20–31, 26–22
Pts: Paul George 23; Rebs: David West 12; Asts: West, Stephenson, Hill 4 each	Pts: LeBron James 32; Rebs: LeBron James 10; Asts: LeBron James 5
Miami leads series, 3–1

AmericanAirlines Arena, Miami
Attendance: 19,874
Referees: Danny Crawford, James Capers, Marc Davis

ESPN

May 28
8:30 pm

Boxscore

Miami Heat 90, Indiana Pacers 93
Scoring by quarter: 16–22, 26–11, 15–31, 33–29
Pts: Chris Bosh 20; Rebs: Chris Bosh 10; Asts: Dwyane Wade 7	Pts: Paul George 37; Rebs: Roy Hibbert 13; Asts: Lance Stephenson 5
Miami leads series, 3–2

Bankers Life Fieldhouse, Indianapolis
Attendance: 18,165
Referees: Ken Mauer, Ed Malloy, Tom Washington

ESPN

May 30
8:30 pm

Boxscore

Indiana Pacers 92, Miami Heat 117
Scoring by quarter: 13–24, 21–36, 24–31, 34–26
Pts: Paul George 29; Rebs: Paul George 8 Asts: Hibbert, Hill, Sloan 3 each	Pts: Bosh, James 25 each Rebs: Chris Andersen 10; Asts: Wade, James 6 each
Miami wins series, 4–2

AmericanAirlines Arena, Miami
Attendance: 20,021
Referees: Scott Foster, Mike Callahan, Jason Phillips

The series marked the third consecutive year that the Heat and the Pacers faced off in the playoffs including the second consecutive time in the Conference Finals. The Heat won the previous two match ups against the Pacers and the Pacers tried to dethrone them as Eastern Conference Champions. In Game 1, the Pacers finally started a series on the right foot by defeating the Heat, 107–96, as they took the series opener. The Pacers jumped to a 10-point lead early and they never looked back, leading by as much as 19. However, the Heat responded by taking Game 2, 87–83, and the home court advantage. LeBron James and Dwyane Wade led the Heat in the clutch, scoring the Heat's last 20 points. Lance Stephenson led the Pacers with 25 points but he was held to one field goal in the fourth quarter. The Heat won Game 3, 99–87, to take a 2–1 series lead. The Pacers started strong, leading by as much as 15 in the second quarter before the Heat cut the lead to 4 by halftime. The Heat eventually pulled away in the fourth quarter with the help of Ray Allen's 16 points including four key three-pointers in the final period. In Game 4, after scoring just a total of 27 points in the first three games, Chris Bosh finally broke out of his slump by scoring 25 points, almost matching his total from the first three games. James led the Heat with 32 points to give the Heat a wire-to-wire 102–90 victory that put them one game away from the NBA Finals.

In Game 5, it seemed like the Heat's 11-point lead in the third quarter was too much to overcome. However, James received his fourth and fifth fouls early in the third quarter, putting him on the bench and giving the Pacers momentum to come back and take Game 5, 93–90, to stave off elimination. Paul George led the Pacers with 37 points, including 21 in the fourth quarter alone. The Heat had a chance to win but Bosh missed a three-pointer. James also produced his worst playoff game, scoring just 7 points after being plagued by foul trouble. However, the Heat did not let the series go to a Game 7 as they blew out the Pacers in Game 6, 117–92, finishing them off for the third straight year as they advanced to their fourth straight NBA Finals appearance.

Regular-season series

Tied 2–2 in the regular-season series

December 10, 2013

Recap

Miami Heat 84, Indiana Pacers 90

Bankers Life Fieldhouse, Indianapolis

December 18, 2013

Recap

Indiana Pacers 94, Miami Heat 97

AmericanAirlines Arena, Miami

March 26, 2014

Recap

Miami Heat 83, Indiana Pacers 84

Bankers Life Fieldhouse, Indianapolis

April 11, 2014

Recap

Indiana Pacers 86, Miami Heat 98

AmericanAirlines Arena, Miami

This was the fourth playoff meeting between these two teams, with the Heat winning two of the first three meetings.

Previous playoff series
Miami leads 2–1 in all-time playoff series

2004

Indiana Pacers 4, Miami Heat 2

2004 Eastern Conference Semifinals

2012

Indiana Pacers 2, Miami Heat 4

2012 Eastern Conference Semifinals

2013

Indiana Pacers 3, Miami Heat 4

2013 Eastern Conference Finals

- This is the most recent playoff series between the Pacers & Heat until 2020.

=== Western Conference finals ===
==== (1) San Antonio Spurs vs. (2) Oklahoma City Thunder ====
TNT

May 19
9:00 pm

Boxscore

Oklahoma City Thunder 105, San Antonio Spurs 122
Scoring by quarter: 27–30, 32–37, 23–22, 23–33
Pts: Kevin Durant 28; Rebs: Durant, Perkins 9 each Asts: Russell Westbrook 7	Pts: Tim Duncan 27; Rebs: Tiago Splitter 8 Asts: Tony Parker 12
San Antonio leads series, 1–0

AT&T Center, San Antonio
Attendance: 18,581
Referees: Danny Crawford, Marc Davis, Derrick Stafford

TNT

May 21
9:00 pm

Boxscore

Oklahoma City Thunder 77, San Antonio Spurs 112
Scoring by quarter: 26–24, 18–34, 18–33, 15–21
Pts: Durant, Westbrook 15 each Rebs: Steven Adams 8 Asts: Russell Westbrook 5	Pts: Tony Parker 22; Rebs: Tim Duncan 12; Asts: Tony Parker 5
San Antonio leads series, 2–0

AT&T Center, San Antonio
Attendance: 18,581
Referees: Ken Mauer, Ron Garretson, Ed Malloy

TNT

May 25
8:30 pm

Boxscore

San Antonio Spurs 97, Oklahoma City Thunder 106
Scoring by quarter: 29–28, 24–29, 23–26, 21–23
Pts: Manu Ginóbili 23; Rebs: Duncan, Splitter 8 each Asts: Boris Diaw 6	Pts: Russell Westbrook 26; Rebs: Kevin Durant 10; Asts: Russell Westbrook 7
San Antonio leads series, 2–1

Chesapeake Energy Arena, Oklahoma City, Oklahoma
Attendance: 18,203
Referees: Scott Foster, Bill Kennedy, Tom Washington

TNT

May 27
9:00 pm

Boxscore

San Antonio Spurs 92, Oklahoma City Thunder 105
Scoring by quarter: 20–26, 23–32, 24–25, 25–22
Pts: Diaw, Parker 14 each Rebs: Boris Diaw 10; Asts: Duncan, Parker 4 each	Pts: Russell Westbrook 40; Rebs: Kendrick Perkins 10; Asts: Russell Westbrook 10
Series tied, 2–2

Chesapeake Energy Arena, Oklahoma City, Oklahoma
Attendance: 18,203
Referees: Joe Crawford, Mike Callahan, Jason Phillips

TNT

May 29
9:00 pm

Boxscore

Oklahoma City Thunder 89, San Antonio Spurs 117
Scoring by quarter: 32–32, 23–33, 19–29, 15–23
Pts: Kevin Durant 25; Rebs: Kendrick Perkins 6 Asts: Russell Westbrook 7	Pts: Tim Duncan 22; Rebs: Tim Duncan 12; Asts: Manu Ginóbili 6
San Antonio leads series, 3–2

AT&T Center, San Antonio
Attendance: 18,581
Referees: Monty McCutchen, Tony Brothers, John Goble

TNT

May 31
8:30 pm

Boxscore

San Antonio Spurs 112, Oklahoma City Thunder 107 (OT)
Scoring by quarter: 20–23, 22–26, 37–20, 22–32, Overtime: 11–6
Pts: Boris Diaw 26; Rebs: Tim Duncan 15; Asts: Manu Ginóbili 5	Pts: Russell Westbrook 34; Rebs: Kevin Durant 14; Asts: Russell Westbrook 8
San Antonio wins series, 4–2

Chesapeake Energy Arena, Oklahoma City, Oklahoma
Attendance: 18,203
Referees: Danny Crawford, James Capers, Zach Zarba

The series featured a rematch of the 2012 Western Conference Finals that was won by the Thunder in six games after they trailed 0–2 in the series. The series was expected to be close, but the Thunder suffered a big blow when Serge Ibaka was ruled out of the rest of the playoffs. The Spurs took advantage of the absence of Ibaka as they blew out the Thunder in Game 1. The Spurs were able to outscore the Thunder, 66–32, in the paint. Game 2 saw the Spurs blow out the Thunder by 35 points, with the Spurs holding Kevin Durant and Russell Westbrook to 15 points each. Danny Green hit seven three-pointers in the game. Before Game 3, fortunes turned around for the Thunder when Ibaka was upgraded to "day-to-day," allowing for the possibility that he could play in the series. Ibaka returned in Game 3 as a member of the starting lineup, and his presence motivated the Thunder to win Game 3, cutting their series deficit to 2–1. The Thunder proceeded to blow out the Spurs in Game 4, tying the series at 2 games apiece. Westbrook led the Thunder with 40 points and Durant added 31 points.

In Game 5, the Spurs didn't let a repeat of the 2012 Western Conference Finals happen as they blew out the Thunder once again to take a 3–2 series lead, sending them a win away from a return trip to the NBA Finals. Game 6 was the first close game in the series. Before the fourth quarter began, Tony Parker suffered a minor injury, and sat out the rest of the game, so Patty Mills played most of the fourth quarter and the overtime. The Spurs held a 6-point lead with around 2 1/2 minutes remaining, but the Thunder answered with an 8–0 run. However, Manu Ginóbili hit a three-pointer and a split from the free throw line to give the Spurs a 2-point lead before Westbrook sent the game to overtime with two free throws. In overtime, it was Tim Duncan who helped the Spurs pull away as they won the series, 4–2, to advance to the NBA Finals for a second straight year.

Regular-season series

Oklahoma City won 4–0 in the regular-season series

November 27, 2013

Recap

San Antonio Spurs 88, Oklahoma City Thunder 94

Chesapeake Energy Arena, Oklahoma City, Oklahoma

December 21, 2013

Recap

Oklahoma City Thunder 113, San Antonio Spurs 100

AT&T Center, San Antonio

January 22, 2014

Recap

Oklahoma City Thunder 111, San Antonio Spurs 105

AT&T Center, San Antonio

April 3, 2014

Recap

San Antonio Spurs 94, Oklahoma City Thunder 106

Chesapeake Energy Arena, Oklahoma City, Oklahoma

This was the fifth playoff meeting between these two teams, with the Spurs winning three of the first four meetings.

Previous playoff series
San Antonio leads 3–1 in all-time playoff series

1982

San Antonio Spurs 4, Seattle SuperSonics 1

1982 Western Conference Semifinals

2002

San Antonio Spurs 3, Seattle SuperSonics 2

2002 Western Conference First Round

2005

San Antonio Spurs 4, Seattle SuperSonics 2

2005 Western Conference Semifinals

2012

Oklahoma City Thunder 4, San Antonio Spurs 2

2012 Western Conference Finals

== NBA Finals: (E2) Miami Heat vs. (W1) San Antonio Spurs ==
ABC

June 5
9:00 pm

Boxscore

Miami Heat 95, San Antonio Spurs 110
Scoring by quarter: 20–26, 29–28, 29–20, 17–36
Pts: LeBron James 25; Rebs: Chris Bosh 9 Asts: Norris Cole 5	Pts: Tim Duncan 21; Rebs: Duncan, Diaw 10; Asts: Manu Ginóbili 11
San Antonio leads series, 1–0

AT&T Center, San Antonio
Attendance: 18,581
Referees: Scott Foster, Marc Davis, Ken Mauer

ABC

June 8
8:00 pm

Boxscore

Miami Heat 98, San Antonio Spurs 96
Scoring by quarter: 19–26, 24–17, 34–35, 21–18
Pts: LeBron James 35; Rebs: LeBron James 10; Asts: Chalmers, Wade 4 each	Pts: Tony Parker 21; Rebs: Tim Duncan 15; Asts: Tony Parker 7
Series tied, 1–1

AT&T Center, San Antonio
Attendance: 18,581
Referees: Danny Crawford, James Capers, Jason Phillips

ABC

June 10
9:00 pm

Boxscore

San Antonio Spurs 111, Miami Heat 92
Scoring by quarter: 41–25, 30–25, 15–25, 25–17
Pts: Kawhi Leonard 29; Rebs: Tim Duncan 6 Asts: Parker, Mills 4 each	Pts: James, Wade 22 each Rebs: James, Andersen 5 each Asts: LeBron James 7
San Antonio leads series, 2–1

AmericanAirlines Arena, Miami
Attendance: 19,900
Referees: Monty McCutchen, Tony Brothers, Zach Zarba

ABC

June 12
9:00 pm

Boxscore

San Antonio Spurs 107, Miami Heat 86
Scoring by quarter: 26–17, 29–19, 26–21, 26–29
Pts: Kawhi Leonard 20; Rebs: Kawhi Leonard 14; Asts: Boris Diaw 9	Pts: LeBron James 28; Rebs: LeBron James 8 Asts: Mario Chalmers 5
San Antonio leads series, 3–1

AmericanAirlines Arena, Miami
Attendance: 19,900
Referees: Joe Crawford, Mike Callahan, Tom Washington

ABC

June 15
8:00 pm

Boxscore

Miami Heat 87, San Antonio Spurs 104
Scoring by quarter: 29–22, 11–25, 18–30, 29–27
Pts: LeBron James 31; Rebs: LeBron James 10; Asts: LeBron James 5	Pts: Kawhi Leonard 22; Rebs: Kawhi Leonard 10; Asts: Boris Diaw 6
San Antonio wins series, 4–1

AT&T Center, San Antonio
Attendance: 18,581
Referees: Scott Foster, Marc Davis, Ken Mauer

- Game 5 is Ray Allen's final NBA game.

Regular-season series

Tied 1–1 in the regular-season series

January 26, 2014

Recap

San Antonio Spurs 101, Miami Heat 113

AmericanAirlines Arena, Miami

March 6, 2014

Recap

Miami Heat 87, San Antonio Spurs 111

AT&T Center, San Antonio

The San Antonio Spurs had met the Miami Heat the previous year in the Finals, and on the brink of winning the championship title with seconds left, the Spurs blew a 5-point lead with 28 seconds left in Game 6. Thus, it was quite clear that the Spurs wanted redemption.

In Game 1, it was quite tight for the first three quarters, but mid-way in the 4th quarter, LeBron James suffered a cramp injury, forcing him to leave the game with 25 points. The Spurs then went on an 18–2 run with James not on the court and comfortably won 110–95 and take a 1–0 lead. Game 2 was quite similar, being very close for almost all of the game, despite LeBron's 14 points in the 3rd quarter on 6 straight jump shots and 35 points for the game. In the 4th quarter, Chris Bosh made several clutch plays, including a 3-pointer, and setting up Dwyane Wade to put up Miami by 5 with less than 10 seconds left. Miami tied the series, winning 98–96.

In Game 3, Miami looked to take the lead in the series, having not lost at home in eight games for the entire postseason. However, it was all San Antonio, scoring 41 points in the first quarter and 71 points at the half on 76% shooting, an NBA Finals record. The Heat, down 21 points at the half and down as much 25 throughout the game, cut the lead to 7, but never come closer. Big performances from Kawhi Leonard (career-high 29 points on 10–13 shooting) and Danny Green (15 points on 7–8 shooting & 5 steals in 21 minutes) helped ease the Spurs to a 111–92 blowout, taking a 2–1 series lead and handing Miami their first home loss of the playoffs. Game 4 was strikingly similar, with San Antonio dominating the first half 55–36, and never looking back. Another good performance by Kawhi Leonard (20 points, 14 rebounds, 3 assists, 3 blocks, 3 steals), Tony Parker (19 points) and Patty Mills (14 points in 16 minutes) helped the Spurs to a 107–86 blowout and take a commanding 3–1 lead in the series. This was also the first time Miami had lost 2 consecutive playoff games since 2012. Tim Duncan also made history, having played the most minutes in NBA playoff history while also passing Magic Johnson for the most double-doubles in the playoffs with 158.

In Game 5, Miami got off to a fast start, once leading 22–6, while LeBron James having a 17-point and 6-rebound first quarter. However, San Antonio outscored Miami by 14 in the second quarter, sneaking their way back into the game. In the third quarter, the Spurs outscored Miami 30–18, with Patty Mills scoring 14 points in the quarter with 4 3-point shots, and from there on it was a blowout. Despite a 31–10–5 performance from LeBron James, poor performances came from Chris Bosh, Dwyane Wade and Ray Allen (combining for 11–34 shooting). Kawhi Leonard shot 70% from the field and 75% from 3-point land and score 22 points while also going along with 10 rebounds, Ginobili and Mills shot a combined 8–14 from 3-point territory, and the Spurs shot 46% from 3-point land, and the San Antonio Spurs blew out the Heat again 104–87 to win their fifth title in franchise history and avenge the previous year's heartbreaking loss.

This was the second playoff meeting between these two teams, with the Heat winning the first meeting.

Previous playoff series
Miami leads 1–0 in all-time playoff series

2013

Miami Heat 4, San Antonio Spurs 3

2013 NBA Finals

== Statistical leaders ==
Category	High			Average			
Category	Player	Team	Total	Player	Team	Avg.	Games played
Points	LeBron James	Miami Heat	49	Kevin Durant	Oklahoma City Thunder	29.6	19
Rebounds	DeAndre Jordan	Los Angeles Clippers	22	Dwight Howard	Houston Rockets	13.7	6
Assists	Russell Westbrook; Chris Paul	Oklahoma City Thunder; Los Angeles Clippers	16	Chris Paul	Los Angeles Clippers	10.4	13
Steals	Paul George; Manu Ginóbili; Russell Westbrook	Indiana Pacers; San Antonio Spurs; Oklahoma City Thunder	6	Chris Paul	Los Angeles Clippers	2.8	13
Blocks	David West	Indiana Pacers	6	Dwight Howard	Houston Rockets	2.8	6

== Media coverage ==
=== Television ===
In the United States, ESPN, ESPN2, ABC, TNT, and NBA TV broadcast the 2014 NBA Playoffs nationally in its entirety. In the first round, the regional sports networks affiliated with the teams participating can also broadcast the games. The first round was mostly televised by ESPN, ESPN2, TNT, and NBA TV, with ABC getting select weekend afternoon games. In the second round, ESPN, ESPN2, and TNT continued to air games, while ABC again gets a few weekend afternoon games. TNT televised the Western Conference Finals, and ESPN aired the Eastern Conference Finals (with Game 1 televised on ABC). The NBA Finals aired in primetime on ABC. In the Philippines, the playoffs were aired by ABS-CBN Sports and Action.

=== Radio ===
ESPN Radio had exclusive radio rights to broadcast the playoffs in the United States. They broadcast most of the games, including all of the Conference Finals and NBA Finals.
