= East Asia Super League =

International basketball league in the Far East

- Upcoming season or competition: 2026–27 East Asia Super League
- Sport: Basketball
- Founded: 2016
- First season: 2023–24
- Motto: Your Game
- No. of teams: 12
- Country: Chinese Taipei; Hong Kong; Japan; Macau; Mongolia; Philippines; South Korea
- Continent: FIBA Asia (Asia)
- Most recent champion: (Japan) Utsunomiya Brex (1st title)
- Most titles: (Japan) Chiba Jets (Japan) Hiroshima Dragonflies (Japan) Utsunomiya Brex (1 title each) (Note: Excluding the pre-season tournaments era prior to 2023)
- Promotion to: Basketball Champions League Asia
- Website: easl.basketball

East Asia Super League
- Traditional Chinese: 東亞超級聯賽
- Simplified Chinese: 东亚超级联赛
Transcriptions

The East Asia Super League (Note: Official name in other languages: Simplified Chinese: 东亚超级联赛; traditional Chinese: 東亞超級聯賽; pinyin: Dōng Yà Chāojí Liánsài; Japanese: 東アジアスーパーリーグ, romanized: Higashi Ajia Sūpā Rīgu; Korean: 동아시아 슈퍼리그) (EASL) is an international basketball league featuring 12 club teams from Hong Kong, Japan, Macau, Mongolia, the Philippines, South Korea, and Taiwan (Chinese Taipei).

From 2017 to 2019, four pre-season tournaments (the Super 8 and the Terrific 12) were organized by the EASL, featuring clubs from selected professional basketball leagues in the region.

With official backing from FIBA Asia, the EASL has made a transition towards a full-fledged league. The first such season commenced in 2023 and featured eight teams. This was expanded to ten teams for the 2024–25 season, and to twelve teams for the 2025–26 season.

Since the 2025–26 season, the EASL serves as a pathway towards qualification for Basketball Champions League Asia, FIBA's continental club competition in Asia.

== History ==
The East Asia Super League was co-founded by Matt Beyer and Henry Kerins as the Asia League as a response to what the founders deem as a lack of high-level international tournaments featuring basketball clubs in the region also taking into account the population in the region, about 2 billion, which could be a potential market for a regional inter-club tournament. The Asia League was envisioned to be East Asian counterpart of the NBA's Las Vegas Summer League where professional teams from Asia could compete against each other with minimal conflict with their mother league's schedules.

Their stated mission is to be able to organized basketball tournaments featuring club sides from top Asian leagues with the organizers naming the CBA (China), B.League (Japan), KBL (South Korea), PBA (Philippines), SBL (Taiwan), and the ABL (Southeast Asia, China, and Taiwan).

=== Preseason tournaments era (2017–2020) ===
==== The Super 8 ====
The first tournament by EASL, then called the Asia League, was the Super 8: Macau Basketball Invitational, involving eight teams in September 2017 at the Studio City Event Centre in Macau. The competing teams in attendance were the Zhejiang Guangsha Lions, Shenzhen Aviators (formerly Shenzhen Leopards), Goyang Orions, Seoul Samsung Thunders, Fubon Braves, Pauian Archiland, Chiba Jets, and Ryukyu Golden Kings.

Organizers initially dubbed the tournament as the "Asia League," but this led to a legal dispute with FIBA over the name of the league when FIBA deemed the tournament's branding and marketing to be in conflict with its own FIBA Asia Champions Cup. The dispute led to the renaming of the competition to "Super 8," and the tournament was then officially recognized by FIBA after the league organizers sought legal assistance of Quinn Emanuel's Thomas Werlen, who has represented FIFA in investigations of the United States Department of Justice.

The inaugural Super 8 tournament was won by the Chiba Jets of the Japanese B. League, with the Zhejiang Guangsha Lions placing second and the Goyang Orions taking third place. The event garnered 21 million views worldwide.

A second edition of the tournament, dubbed the Summer Super 8, followed in July 2018 at the Macau East Asian Games Dome, and featured the introduction of two professional club teams from the PBA, the NLEX Road Warriors and Blackwater Elite. The eight competing teams in attendance were the Guangzhou Loong Lions, Xinjiang Flying Tigers, Seoul Samsung Thunders, Incheon Electroland Elephants, NLEX Road Warriors, Blackwater Elite, Rizing Zephyr Fukuoka, and Formosa Dreamers. The Guangzhou Loong Lions won first place, while the Seoul Samsung Thunders took second place and the Incheon Electroland Elephants placed third.

==== The Terrific 12 ====
Logo of The Terrific 12 tournament.

In 2018, the Super 8 tournament was expanded into a larger tournament format called The Terrific 12, featuring 12 teams instead of eight. The Terrific 12 (2018) tournament was organized in collaboration with and supported by the Sports Bureau of Macau SAR Government and hosted at the Studio City Event Centre.

The competing teams were the Shandong Heroes (formerly Shandong Golden Stars), Zhejiang Guangsha Lions, Xinjiang Flying Tigers, Ulsan Hyundai Mobis Phoebus, Seoul Samsung Thunders, Fubon Braves, Yulon Luxgen Dinos, Nagoya Diamond Dolphins, Ryukyu Golden Kings and Chiba Jets. The Ryukyu Golden Kings won first place, while the Guangzhou Loong Lions placed second and the Seoul Samsung Thunders took third place.

In 2019, Asia League rebranded to the "East Asia Super League," and it hosted the second iteration of The Terrific 12 at the Tap Seac Multi-Sports Pavilion in Macau from September 17–22. The competing teams were the Liaoning Flying Leopards, Shenzhen Aviators, Zhejiang Guangsha Lions, Chiba Jets, Niigata Albirex BB, Ryukyu Golden Kings, Utsonomiya BREX, Jeonju KCC Egis, Seoul SK Knights, Blackwater Elite, TNT KaTropa and San Miguel Beermen.

Terrific 12 (2019) also featured the EASL debut of former NBA player and CBA import Lance Stephenson, who earned MVP awards for his 34-point outburst in the Terrific 12 (2019) championship finals, a close 83–82 finish for the Liaoning Flying Leopards over the Seoul SK Knights. The Zhejiang Guangsha Lions won second place and the San Miguel Beermen took home third in the event.

Plans for a 2020 iteration of The Terrific 12 tournament on September have been cancelled due to the COVID-19 pandemic.

=== Start of regular EASL seasons (2023–) ===
Logo of the EASL used until 2025.

==== Plans and postponements ====
In August 2020, EASL and FIBA entered into a multi-year agreement granting EASL FIBA's recognition to hold a full-fledged in-season league featuring clubs from Japan, South Korea, the Philippines, and Taiwan (representing "Greater China"). The inaugural season would feature 8 teams. It was planned that they would play home-and-away games against each other with the top four teams advancing to a Final Four event.

P. League+ (Taiwan), the Philippine Basketball Association, the Korean Basketball League (South Korea), and the B.League (Japan) committed to send teams for the EASL. The Bay Area Dragons, a franchise team meant to represent "Greater China" was also formed by the EASL.

The EASL received high profile financial support. The Raine Group along with former NBA stars such as Metta Sandiford-Artest, Baron Davis and Shane Battier in December 2021 reportedly invested in the EASL.

The launch of the EASL would be hindered by the COVID-19 pandemic, with plans to hold its inaugural home-and-away tournament in 2022 cancelled.

==== 2023 season: Champions Week ====
In place of the cancelled 2022 home-and-away tournament, the 2023 EASL Champions Week would be organized. It was originally meant as a pre-season tournament for the 2023–24 season. Anyang KGC were the first champions.

==== 2023–24 EASL season: inaugural season ====
With the COVID-19 pandemic travel restrictions lifted in regions surrounding the partnering leagues, EASL was able start their inaugural season in October 2023.

The champions and runner-up of Japan's B.League (Ryukyu Golden Kings and Chiba Jets), South Korea's KBL (Anyang KGC and Seoul SK Knights), Chinese Taipei's P. League+ (Taipei Fubon Braves and New Taipei Kings) got a berth for the 2023–24 season. The Philippines' PBA was represented by 2023 PBA Commissioner's Cup champions, TNT Tropang Giga and semifinalists, Meralco Bolts.

The 2023 B.League runner-up Chiba Jets went undefeated in the Group Stage, winning the Group A while 2023 KBL champions, Anyang Jung Kwan Jang Red Boosters came in second in Group A with a 4-2 record. In Group B, 2023 KBL runners-up, Seoul SK Knights won the group, while P. League+ runners-up, New Taipei Kings, came in second. The four teams would advance to the 2024 EASL Final Four in a three-day playoffs held in Hoops Dome, Cebu, Philippines.

In the first game of the 2024 EASL Final, the Seoul SK Knights defeated Korean-counterpart Anyang Jung Kwan Jang Red Boosters in a tightly contest battle, advancing to the 2024 EASL Final Four Championship Game. The Chiba Jets stayed undefeated following a win against the New Taipei Kings.

In the Championship Game, the Chiba Jets defeated Seoul SK Knights in a tightly-contested game, beating the Korean side 72-69, becoming the first champion in EASL history. Japan National Basketball Team captain, Yuki Togashi was named 2024 EASL Final Four Most Valuable Player.

==== 2024–25 EASL season: second season ====
The 2024 B.League champions Hiroshima Dragonflies and runners-up Ryukyu Golden Kings represented Japan. The 2024 KBL champions, Busan KCC Egis and runners-up, Suwon KT Sonicboom represented South Korea. The 2024 P. League+ champions New Taipei Kings and runners-up Taoyuan Pauian Pilots represented Chinese Taipei. The 2024 PBA Philippine Cup champions Meralco Bolts and 2024 PBA Commissioner's Cup champions San Miguel Beermen represented the Philippines.

For the expansion teams, representing Hong Kong was Hong Kong Eastern, while the Macau Black Bears represented Macau.

In the Championship Game, the Hiroshima Dragonflies defeated Taoyuan Pauian Pilots, 72-68, winning the 2024–25 season championship. And Dwayne Evans was named as 2025 EASL Final Four Most Valuable Player.

==== 2025–26 EASL season: third season ====
On January 24, 2025, the EASL announced that the 2024-25 season champion of The League would represent Mongolia to join 2025–26 EASL season. On May 13, the EASL announced that the 2025 Emperor’s Cup champion would join 2025–26 EASL season. (Note: If the Emperor’s Cup champion reaches the B.League finals, the EASL spot would go to the Emperor’s Cup runner-up. If the Emperor’s Cup champion and runner-up all reach the finals, the highest-seeded semifinalist not advancing would take the spot.) On July 24, the EASL announced that New Taipei Kings would return to 2025–26 EASL season. On July 28, the EASL announced that Hong Kong Eastern and Macau Black Bears would return to 2025–26 EASL season. And the EASL announced that the group stage would change to three group. The top two teams from each group advanced to postseason. On December 15, the FIBA announced that EASL became the official qualifier for Basketball Champions League Asia (BCL Asia). The top performing EASL teams representing B.League, Korean Basketball League and the Philippine Basketball Association would secure direct qualification to BCL Asia.

In the Championship Game, the Utsunomiya Brex defeated Taoyuan Pauian Pilots, 90-81, winning the 2025–26 season championship. And Makoto Hiejima was named as 2026 EASL Finals MVP.

==== 2026–27 EASL season: fourth season ====
On May 26, 2026, the EASL announced that the 3 teams of the P. League+ playoffs would join 2026–27 EASL season. On July 10, the EASL announced that Hong Kong Eastern would return to 2026–27 EASL season. On July 13, the EASL announced that Macau Hou Chon would join 2026–27 EASL season. On July 21, the FIBA modified the qualification structure for Basketball Champions League Asia (BCL Asia). The best-ranked EASL teams from Japan and Korea, and the best-ranked EASL team overall excluding teams from Japan and Korea would secure direct qualification to BCL Asia. On August 19, the EASL announced that the 2025 season champion of the Maharlika Pilipinas Basketball League (MPBL) would represent the Philippines to join 2026–27 EASL season.

== Leagues represented ==
The East Asia Super League starting from the 2023 EASL Champions Week is represented by teams from selected domestic leagues.

The league considers the franchise team and the P. League+ championship team of Taiwan as representatives of "Greater China".

Starting from the 2026–27 season, the league represented are as follow:

League	Country or region	Berth(s)
P. League+	Chinese Taipei (Note: Taiwan, officially Republic of China. The organizers of the EASL and FIBA uses the designation of "Chinese Taipei".)	3
B.League	Japan	3
Korean Basketball League	South Korea	2
The League	Mongolia	1
Maharlika Pilipinas Basketball League	Philippines	1
Other	Hong Kong	1
Other	Macau	1

Former leagues

League	Country or region	First season	Last season
Philippine Basketball Association	Philippines	2023–24	2025–26

=== Preseason tournaments ===
The following leagues were represented in the EASL's preseason tournaments from 2017 to 2023.

From 2021 to 2023, the EASL maintained its own franchise team independent from any other domestic leagues, the Bay Area Dragons.

Country or region	League
China	Chinese Basketball Association
Chinese Taipei	Super Basketball League
Japan	B.League
South Korea	Korean Basketball League
Philippines	Philippine Basketball Association
Philippines	None (selection team)
Hong Kong	None (franchise team)

== Results ==
=== Pre-season tournaments ===
Year	Tournament	Final			Third and fourth place		
Year	Tournament	Winners	Score	Second place	Third place	Score	Fourth place
Asia League (2017–2018)
2017	Super 8	(Japan); Chiba Jets	83–73	(China); Zhejiang Guangsha Lions	(South Korea); Goyang Orions	88–71	(Japan); Ryukyu Golden Kings
2018	Super 8	(China); Guangzhou Loong Lions	78–72	(South Korea); Seoul Samsung Thunders	(South Korea); Incheon Electroland Elephants	67–62	(Philippines); NLEX Road Warriors
2018	The Terrific 12	(Japan); Ryukyu Golden Kings	85–76	(China); Guangzhou Loong Lions	(South Korea); Seoul Samsung Thunders	105–92	(Japan); Nagoya Diamond Dolphins
East Asia Super League (2019–2023)
2019	The Terrific 12	(China); Liaoning Flying Leopards	83–82	(South Korea); Seoul SK Knights	(China); Zhejiang Lions	91–89	(Philippines); San Miguel Beermen
2020	The Terrific 12	Canceled due to the COVID-19 pandemic			Canceled due to the COVID-19 pandemic		
2021–22		No tournament			No tournament		
2023	Champions Week	(South Korea); Anyang KGC	90–84	(South Korea); Seoul SK Knights	(Hong Kong); Bay Area Dragons	90–70	(Japan); Ryukyu Golden Kings

=== Regular seasons ===
No.	Year	Final Four/Finals hosts	Final			Third and fourth place			No. of teams
No.	Year	Final Four/Finals hosts	Winners	Score	Second place	Third place	Score	Fourth place	No. of teams
1	2023–24; Details	Philippines	(Japan); Chiba Jets	72–69	(South Korea); Seoul SK Knights	(South Korea); Anyang Jung Kwan Jang Red Boosters	78–76	(Chinese Taipei); New Taipei Kings	8
2	2024–25; Details	Macau	(Japan); Hiroshima Dragonflies	84–80	(Chinese Taipei); Taoyuan Pauian Pilots	(Chinese Taipei); New Taipei Kings	72–68	(Japan); Ryukyu Golden Kings	10
3	2025–26; Details	Macau	(Japan); Utsunomiya Brex	90–81	(Chinese Taipei); Taoyuan Pauian Pilots	(Japan); Ryukyu Golden Kings	77–76	(Japan); Alvark Tokyo	12
4	2026–27; Details	TBA	To be determined			To be determined			12

== Medal table ==
=== Preseason tournaments era (2017–2023) ===
Nation	Gold	Silver	Bronze	Total
Japan	5	0	0	4
China	2	2	1	5
South Korea	2	2	3	7
Hong Kong	0	0	1	1

== Media coverage ==
As of the 2026–27 season.

Country/region	Broadcaster
Worldwide	YouTube
Australia	beIN Sports
New Zealand	beIN Sports
Brunei	Astro
Malaysia	Astro
China	Migu
Hong Kong	HOY TV
Indonesia	Emtek
Japan	U-Next
South Korea	JTBC Golf&Sports
South Korea	MBC Sports+
Macau	TDM
Macau	Macau Cable
Maldives	Medianet
Mongolia	PSN
Myanmar	Sky Net
Philippines	TAP Sports
Singapore	StarHub TV
Taiwan	Formosa TV
Taiwan	TVBS
Thailand	TrueVisions

== See also ==
- ASEAN Basketball League
- FIBA West Asia Super League
- AsiaBasket
- Basketball Champions League Asia
- William Jones Cup
