= Lance Stephenson =

American basketball player (born 1990)

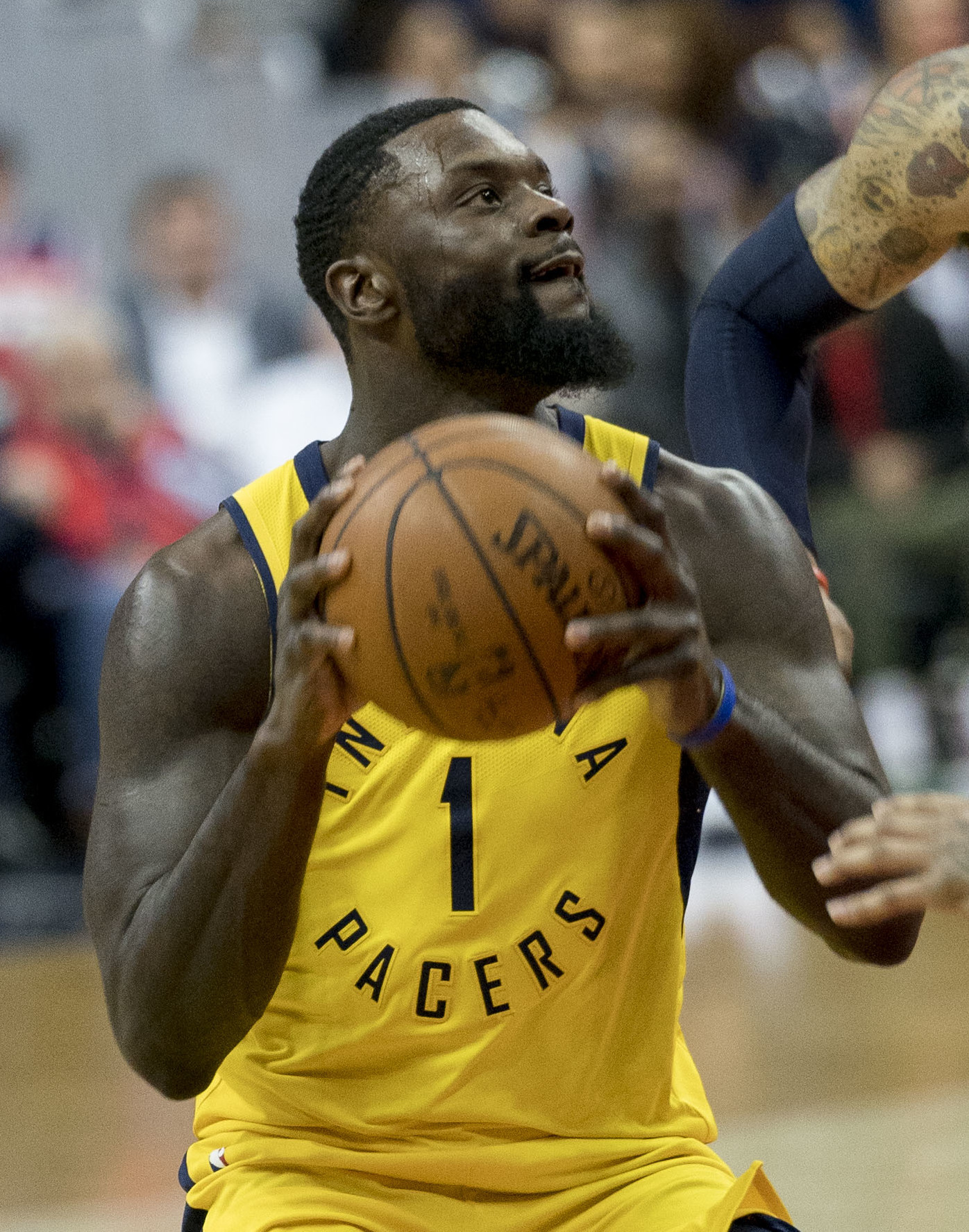
- Stephenson with the Indiana Pacers in 2018

Personal information
- Born: September 5, 1990 (age 36) Brooklyn, New York, U.S.
- Listed height: 6 ft 5 in (1.96 m)
- Listed weight: 210 lb (95 kg)

Career information
- High school: Abraham Lincoln (Brooklyn, New York)
- College: Cincinnati (2009–2010)
- NBA draft: 2010: 2nd round, 40th overall pick
- Drafted by: Indiana Pacers
- Playing career: 2010–2025
- Position: Shooting guard / small forward
- Number: 6, 1, 5, 7, 33

Career history
- 2010–2014: Indiana Pacers
- 2014–2015: Charlotte Hornets
- 2015–2016: Los Angeles Clippers
- 2016: Memphis Grizzlies
- 2016: New Orleans Pelicans
- 2017: Minnesota Timberwolves
- 2017–2018: Indiana Pacers
- 2018–2019: Los Angeles Lakers
- 2019–2020: Liaoning Flying Leopards
- 2021: Grand Rapids Gold
- 2021–2022: Atlanta Hawks
- 2022: Indiana Pacers
- 2023: Leones de Ponce
- 2023–2024: Iowa Wolves
- 2025: Singapore Adroit

Career highlights
- Terrific 12 champion (2019); Terrific 12 MVP (2019); Big East Rookie of the Year (2010); Big East All-Rookie Team (2010); McDonald's All-American (2009); First-team Parade All-American (2009); Second-team Parade All-American (2008); Co-Mr. New York Basketball (2009)
- Stats at NBA.com
- Stats at Basketball Reference

Lance Stephenson Jr. (born September 5, 1990) is an American former professional basketball player. He attended Lincoln High School in the Coney Island section of Brooklyn, where he was named Mr. New York Basketball after his senior year and appeared in the 2009 McDonald's All-American Game. He later played college basketball for the Cincinnati Bearcats and was selected in the second round of the 2010 NBA draft by the Indiana Pacers. He is widely known for his wily and unique playstyle, which includes flashy passing, quick drives to the rim, and humorous celebrations.

== High school career ==
Stephenson first caught the attention of scouts at age 12, when Clark Francis, a talent evaluator, saw him play at Rumble in the Bronx AAU tournament. Before his first year of high school, he attended the Adidas ABCD Camp, where he challenged O. J. Mayo to a one-on-one game.

In the summer of 2005, Stephenson enrolled at Bishop Loughlin Memorial High School, but he only attended the school for three days. The school lost in the championship game. The following week, Stephenson did not return to classes at Bishop Loughlin, and was attending Abraham Lincoln High School near his home in Coney Island. National Basketball Association players Stephon Marbury, Sebastian Telfair, and future Seton Hall University star Isaiah Whitehead had also attended and played basketball at Lincoln High. Head coach Dwayne Morton said, "[Stephenson] always talked about outdoing Sebastian, outdoing Stephon," and called him "The best I've ever had at Lincoln." Stephenson went on to lead the Railsplitters to the city title that year.

Lincoln High repeated as champions his sophomore and junior years, while Stephenson won back-to-back Player of the Year honors from the New York Daily News. As a sophomore, he was the youngest player featured in the movie Gunnin' for That No. 1 Spot, which followed eight high school basketball prospects. In 2007 as a high school junior he was named to the annual USA Today's All-USA boys basketball team, the only non-senior to be given that honor.

In July 2008, Stephenson tried out for the United States national team's under-18 team, but was cut because of chemistry reasons.

On February 15, 2009, Stephenson passed fellow Lincoln High School alumnus Telfair's previous record of 2,785 points in the Brooklyn borough title game to become the all-time leading scorer for high school basketball in New York State. In March 2009, Stephenson led Lincoln High to an unprecedented fourth consecutive Public Schools Athletic League (PSAL) class AA championship. Stephenson scored a game-high 24 points and grabbed 10 rebounds in the 78–56 final win against John F. Kennedy, and helped Lincoln become the first school in city history to win four straight titles.

Stephenson's high school career ended in the New York State semifinal, where Rice High School beat Lincoln 77–50, and Stephenson was held to 12 points by Rice's Durand Scott, who also beat out Stephenson for the Daily News' New York City player of the year honor. He ended his career with 2,946 points.

In April 2009, Stephenson played in the McDonald's All-American Game, finishing with 12 points, six assists and three steals.

=== Recruiting ===
In early 2009, Stephenson chose Kansas, St. John's and Maryland as his finalists, but he canceled two announcements, and his father said that he had narrowed his choice to Maryland and Arizona.

His official visit to Maryland in February came under scrutiny after he was given a tour of the Under Armour headquarters during his visit. This may have constituted a recruiting violation, as Under Armour CEO Kevin Plank is a Maryland graduate and on the university's board of trustees, and by NCAA rules, "representative of the institution's athletics interests" or a booster.

Stephenson initially told reporters he would announce which college he would be attending following the PSAL title game in March, but delayed the announcement until the McDonald's All-American Game on April 1, saying, "I already know where I'm going. This is not the right place [to make an announcement]." On March 31, Stephenson, who had been expected to commit to Kansas during the All-American game's media event, instead announced that he would delay the announcement again.

In April 2009, another top recruit Xavier Henry, who had been released from his commitment to Memphis after coach John Calipari left to take the Kentucky job, announced he would play for Kansas. Because Henry's commitment put Kansas at the 13-scholarship limit under NCAA rules, it ruled out a scholarship offer for Stephenson.

On May 20, the last day of the late signing period, Stephenson had not signed a letter of intent, but his father Lance Sr. told USA Today that he would not make a decision until his sexual assault case from October was resolved. The day before, a judge had adjourned his case until June 29.

On June 30, Andy Katz of ESPN.com reported that Stephenson signed a financial aid agreement with the University of Cincinnati, and he joined the Bearcats for the 2009–10 season.

== College career ==
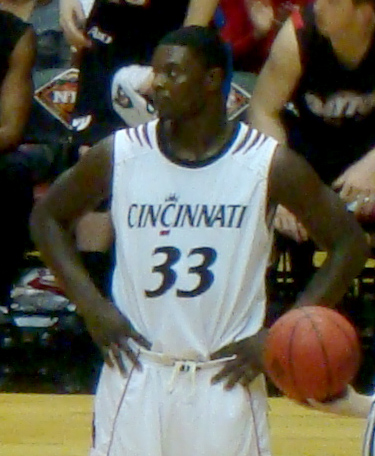
Stephenson with the Cincinnati Bearcats in 2010

Questions remained over Stephenson's eligibility because of his involvement in his documentation, but on November 6, 2009, the NCAA cleared him to play in Cincinnati's season opener against Prairie View A&M University on November 15 without missing any games. In his only season at Cincinnati, Stephenson started 32 of 34 games and averaged 12.3 points and 5.4 rebounds per game. He scored a season-best 23 points and made a season-high 11 field goals in 17 attempts against Georgetown on March 6, 2010. He was the leading scorer among Big East freshmen and was named Big East Rookie of the Year. On April 7, 2010, Stephenson announced that he would forgo his final three seasons of collegiate eligibility and enter the 2010 NBA draft.

== Professional career ==
=== Indiana Pacers (2010–2014) ===
==== Early years (2010–2013) ====
Stephenson was selected by the Indiana Pacers with the 40th pick in the 2010 NBA draft. He did not make his NBA debut until February 27, 2011, in a 110–108 loss to the Phoenix Suns. In four minutes, he recorded two points, two assists and one rebound. He had been in uniform five times before making his debut, but had not received an opportunity due to being the third point guard on the team. He played in 12 regular-season games before being demoted for violating team rules in early April. His ongoing immaturity issues were to blame.

In the lockout-shortened 2011–12 season, Stephenson was a fixture in the first half of the season playing in 32 of the first 35 games, but fell out of the picture in the second half of the season, making just 10 appearances in the final 31. In the regular-season finale on April 25, with the third seed clinched and Danny Granger and Leandro Barbosa given the night off to nurse injuries, Stephenson started for the first time and scored 22 points on 10 of 15 shooting, playing 35 minutes without a turnover. He had 12 points on 5-of-6 shooting in the fourth quarter, but the Pacers fell short against the Chicago Bulls, losing 92–87.

With Danny Granger out injured for the majority of the 2012–13 season, Stephenson had a breakthrough year. He averaged 8.8 points and 3.9 rebounds in 29.2 minutes per game during the regular season. He improved to 9.4 points and 7.6 rebounds during the playoffs, although his shooting percentages dropped in all categories. On April 14, 2013, he scored a season-high 22 points against the New York Knicks. In game six of the Pacers' second-round playoff series against the Knicks, Stephenson scored a career-best 25 points.

==== Breakout season (2013–2014) ====
Stephenson had another breakout season in 2013–14, posting career highs across the board in his second year in a starting role. On November 11, 2013, he scored 13 points with career highs of 12 assists and 11 rebounds for his first career triple-double as the Pacers defeated the Memphis Grizzlies 95–79. He had his second career triple-double eleven days later, recording 10 points, 10 assists and 11 rebounds in a 97–82 win over the Boston Celtics. On December 22, 2013, he recorded his third career triple-double with 12 points, 10 rebounds and 10 assists in a 106–79 win over the Celtics. On January 16, 2014, Stephenson scored a career-high 28 points in a 117–89 win over the Knicks. He finished the regular season with a league-high five triple-doubles, and finished second in NBA Most Improved Player Award voting. The Pacers entered the playoffs as the first seed in the Eastern Conference and advanced to the conference finals, where they lost to the Miami Heat for the second straight year. His unusual tactics made headlines during the Eastern Conference finals against the Miami Heat, including blowing in the ear of LeBron James during a game five win.

Following the 2013–14 season, the Pacers offered him a five-year, $44 million contract, but instead Stephenson opted to test the market, believing that he was worth more.

=== Charlotte Hornets (2014–2015) ===
On July 18, 2014, Stephenson signed a three-year, $27 million contract with the Charlotte Hornets. On November 7, 2014, he won the game for the Hornets in double overtime with a buzzer-beating three-point shot to defeat the Atlanta Hawks 122–119, finishing with his first double-double as a Hornet with 17 points and 13 rebounds. On January 14, 2015, against the San Antonio Spurs, Stephenson returned from a 14-game absence due to a pelvic sprain.

=== Los Angeles Clippers (2015–2016) ===
On June 15, 2015, Stephenson was traded to the Los Angeles Clippers in exchange for Spencer Hawes and Matt Barnes. On December 2, 2015, he scored a then season-high 19 points in a loss to his former team, the Indiana Pacers.

=== Memphis Grizzlies (2016) ===
On February 18, 2016, Stephenson was traded, along with a future first-round pick, to the Memphis Grizzlies in exchange for Jeff Green. On March 11, 2016, he scored a career-high 33 points in a 121–114 overtime win over the New Orleans Pelicans.

=== New Orleans Pelicans (2016) ===
On September 14, 2016, Stephenson signed with the New Orleans Pelicans. After sustaining a groin injury on November 4 and being subsequently ruled out for six to 10 weeks, the Pelicans waived Stephenson on November 7.

=== Minnesota Timberwolves (2017) ===
On February 8, 2017, Stephenson signed a 10-day contract with the Minnesota Timberwolves. On February 14, 2017, in a loss to the Cleveland Cavaliers, he suffered a Grade 2 ankle sprain. On March 8, 2017, after recovering from the injury, Stephenson signed a second 10-day contract with the Timberwolves. On March 18, the Timberwolves decided not to sign him for the rest of the season.

=== Return to Indiana (2017–2018) ===
On March 30, 2017, Stephenson signed with the Indiana Pacers, returning to the franchise for a second stint. On June 25, 2018, the Pacers declined their team option on Stephenson's contract, thus parting ways with him for a second time.

=== Los Angeles Lakers (2018–2019) ===
On July 10, 2018, Stephenson signed with the Los Angeles Lakers. On October 24, 2018, he had 23 points, eight rebounds and eight assists in a 131–113 win over the Phoenix Suns. He missed time in March because of a sprained toe on his left foot.

=== Liaoning Flying Leopards (2019–2020) ===
On August 1, 2019, Stephenson signed with the Liaoning Flying Leopards of the Chinese Basketball Association. On September 22, 2019, he helped the team in an 83–82 title win over Seoul SK Knights at 2019 East Asia Super League Terrific 12 and named the most valuable player of the Terrific 12. Due to restrictions on international travel, Stephenson along with teammate Brandon Bass were unable to return to China in June 2020 to finish the 2019–20 season with the team.

=== Grand Rapids Gold (2021) ===
Stephenson was selected by the Grand Rapids Gold 13th overall in the 2021 NBA G League draft. In 12 games, he averaged 19.8 points (.476 FG%, .306 3FG%, .686 FT%), 8.0 rebounds and 4.3 assists in 35.0 minutes per contest.

=== Atlanta Hawks (2021–2022) ===
On December 22, 2021, Stephenson signed a 10-day contract with the Atlanta Hawks.

=== Third stint with Indiana (2022) ===
After his contract with the Hawks expired, Stephenson signed a new 10-day contract with the Indiana Pacers on January 1, 2022, to return to the franchise for a third stint. He signed the contract under the NBA's COVID-related hardship exception. On January 8, he recorded 16 points, a career-high 14 assists and four steals in a 125–113 win over the Utah Jazz. After initially re-signing with the Pacers on January 11 to a second 10-day contract under the hardship exception, he signed a regular 10-day contract on January 14 due to the Pacers no longer having any players listed in the NBA's Health & Safety protocols. Stephenson signed a second 10-day contract with the Pacers on January 24. On February 4, he signed with the Pacers until the end of the season. On February 13, 2022, Stephenson logged 21 points, four assists, and three rebounds in a 129–120 loss to the Minnesota Timberwolves. On March 24, 2022, Stephenson scored 25 points in a 103–133 loss to the Memphis Grizzlies.

=== Leones de Ponce (2023) ===
On April 27, 2023, Stephenson signed with Leones de Ponce of the Puerto Rican league. He was released on May 6 after appearing in 4 games.

=== Iowa Wolves (2023–2024) ===
On December 14, 2023, Stephenson joined the Iowa Wolves of the NBA G League.

== Career statistics ==
Legend
GP	Games played	GS	Games started	MPG	Minutes per game
FG%	Field goal percentage	3P%	3-point field goal percentage	FT%	Free throw percentage
RPG	Rebounds per game	APG	Assists per game	SPG	Steals per game
BPG	Blocks per game	PPG	Points per game	**Bold**	Career high
*	Led the league

=== NBA ===
==== Regular season ====
Year	Team	GP	GS	MPG	FG%	3P%	FT%	RPG	APG	SPG	BPG	PPG
2010–11	Indiana	12	0	9.6	.333	.000	.786	1.5	1.8	.3	.0	3.1
2011–12	Indiana	42	1	10.5	.376	.133	.471	1.3	1.1	.5	.1	2.5
2012–13	Indiana	78	72	29.2	.460	.330	.652	3.9	2.9	**1.0**	.2	8.8
2013–14	Indiana	78	**78**	**35.3**	.491	.352	.711	**7.2**	4.6	.7	.1	13.8
2014–15	Charlotte	61	25	25.8	.376	.171	.627	4.5	3.9	.6	.1	8.2
2015–16	L.A. Clippers	43	10	15.8	**.494**	.404	.700	2.5	1.4	.6	.1	4.7
2015–16	Memphis	26	3	26.6	.474	.355	**.815**	4.4	2.8	.7	.2	**14.2**
2016–17	New Orleans	6	0	27.0	.473	.100	.625	3.3	**4.8**	.3	.2	9.7
2016–17	Minnesota	6	0	11.2	.476	.000	.500	1.7	.8	.0	.0	3.5
2016–17	Indiana	6	0	22.0	.409	**.625**	.667	4.0	4.2	.5	**.3**	7.2
2017–18	Indiana	**82***	7	22.6	.427	.289	.661	5.2	2.9	.6	.2	9.2
2018–19	L.A. Lakers	68	3	16.5	.426	.371	.685	3.2	2.1	.6	.1	7.2
2021–22	Atlanta	6	0	11.7	.385	.000	.500	2.5	1.8	.0	.0	1.8
2021–22	Indiana	40	1	18.6	.458	.310	.795	2.8	3.9	.6	.1	9.3
Career		554	200	22.9	.445	.314	.694	4.1	2.9	.6	.1	8.6

==== Playoffs ====
Year	Team	GP	GS	MPG	FG%	3P%	FT%	RPG	APG	SPG	BPG	PPG
2012	Indiana	4	0	3.0	.222	**.500**	.500	.0	.3	.0	.0	1.5
2013	Indiana	**19**	**19**	35.4	.408	.281	.622	**7.6**	3.3	**1.2**	.1	9.4
2014	Indiana	**19**	**19**	**37.1**	.455	.358	.714	6.9	**4.2**	.8	**.2**	13.6
2016	Memphis	4	0	23.8	**.523**	.400	**.800**	1.5	1.8	.3	.0	13.0
2017	Indiana	4	0	26.8	.509	.389	.750	5.3	2.8	.5	.0	**16.0**
2018	Indiana	7	0	21.3	.462	.308	.556	2.7	2.9	.3	.1	10.4
Career		57	38	30.5	.448	.330	.670	5.6	3.2	.8	.1	11.1

=== CBA ===
Year	Team	GP	GS	MPG	FG%	3P%	FT%	RPG	APG	SPG	BPG	PPG
2019–20	Liaoning	29	29	34.8	.522	.300	.778	7.4	3.8	1.1	.2	26.7
Career		29	29	34.8	.522	.300	.778	7.4	3.8	1.1	.2	26.7

=== BSN ===
Year	Team	GP	GS	MPG	FG%	3P%	FT%	RPG	APG	SPG	BPG	PPG
2022–23	Leones	4	4	32.0	.556	.217	.762	5.3	2.5	0.3	0.0	20.3
Career		4	4	32.0	.556	.217	.762	5.3	2.5	0.3	0.0	20.3

=== College ===
Year	Team	GP	GS	MPG	FG%	3P%	FT%	RPG	APG	SPG	BPG	PPG
2009-10	Cincinnati	34	32	28.2	.440	.219	.664	5.4	2.5	.9	.2	12.3

=== NBA G League ===
==== Regular season ====
Year	Team	GP	GS	MPG	FG%	3P%	FT%	RPG	APG	SPG	BPG	PPG
2021–22	Grand Rapids	**12**	**12**	**35.0**	**.471**	**.306**	.686	8.3	4.1	.8	**.3**	**19.8**
2023-24	Iowa	3	0	24.3	.441	.000	**.750**	**8.7**	**4.3**	**1.0**	.0	11.3
Career		15	12	32.9	.466	.263	.692	8.4	4.1	.9	.2	18.1

== Personal life ==
Stephenson is the son of Lance Sr. and Bernadette Stephenson. He has a younger brother named Lantz. Stephenson appeared in a cameo role as himself in the 2020 film Fatale.

=== Legal issues ===
In January 2008, Stephenson was suspended from school for five days and missed two games following an altercation with a teammate. In October that year, he was arrested for groping a 17-year-old inside the school. Lance was 18 at the time. He faced a Class B misdemeanor sexual assault charge, and his parents ended the "Born Ready" reality show following the arrest.

On August 15, 2010, Stephenson was arrested for third-degree assault after allegedly pushing his girlfriend down a flight of stairs. The case was eventually dismissed.

=== MMA ===
In May 2026, Stephenson ventured into the world of mixed martial arts. He faced fellow NBA player Michael Beasley in an amateur bout on May 23 at an event held by Brand Risk Promotions. He won the fight via a rear-naked choke submission in the first round.
