= KBL Rookie of the Year Award =

Basketball award

Korean Basketball League Rookie of the Year Award
- Native name: 신인선수상
- Description: Best performing rookie player in the KBL
- Country: South Korea
- Presented by: Korean Basketball League
- Website: www.kbl.or.kr

The Korean Basketball League Rookie of the Year Award (Korean: 신인선수상) is an annual Korean Basketball League (KBL) award given since 1998 to the best performing rookie player. Both foreign and domestic players who meet the criteria are eligible to be nominated for the award.

== Eligibility ==
Domestic players must be in their first two seasons and have played at least 50% of the 54 league games. Foreign players with experience in overseas leagues may be considered for nomination but must have less than a year of playing experience in a professional team.

== History ==
From the 1997–98 season to the 2011–12 seasons, the KBL rookie draft took place in January or February, towards the end of the season. Rookies only began their first season with a professional team in October of the same calendar year, when the KBL season began. The draft was eventually moved closer to the beginning of the professional season.

In terms of award eligibility, the term "rookie" (Korean: 신인) previously only applied to players in their first year as a professional. With the rise of foreign import players and increasing competition among domestic players for spots on the first team, concerns arose over the fact that few first-year players clocked up enough playing time to qualify for the award and players who were only able to break into the first team during their second or third year as a professional. Prior to the 2020–21 season, the KBL announced that eligibility for the award would be extended to players in their first two years and foreign players.

== Winners ==
| ^ | Denotes player who is still active in the KBL |
| † | Denotes player whose team won the KBL Championship that year |
| Player (in italic text) | Denotes player who has also won the KBL Most Valuable Player Award |
| Team (X) | Denotes the number of times a player from this team had won at that time |

| Season | Player | Position | Team |
|---|---|---|---|
| 1997–98 (Note: Prior to the founding of the professional Korean Basketball League, the predecessor National Basketball Festival (농구대잔치) ended its final season in January 1997. The first season of the KBL began play in February 1997 to facilitate the transition and all registered players had already been on the roster from the amateur era. The 1997–98 season was the first full season played with rookie players drafted from college teams.) | Joo Hee-jung | Guard | Wonju Naray Blue Bird |
| 1998–99 | Shin Ki-sung | Guard | Wonju Naray Blue Bird (2) |
| 1999–00 | Kim Sung-chul | Forward | Anyang SBS Stars |
| 2000–01† | Lee Kyu-sup | Forward | Suwon Samsung Thunders |
| 2001–02† | Kim Seung-hyun | Guard | Daegu Tongyang Orions |
| 2002–03† | Kim Joo-sung | Forward | Wonju TG Xers (3) |
| 2003–04 | Lee Hyun-ho | Forward | Seoul Samsung Thunders (2) |
| 2004–05 | Yang Dong-geun | Guard | Ulsan Mobis Phoebus |
| 2005–06 | Bang Seung-yoon | Forward | Seoul SK Knights |
| 2006–07 | Lee Hyun-min | Guard | Changwon LG Sakers |
| 2007–08 | Kim Tae-sul | Guard | Seoul SK Knights (2) |
| 2008–09† | Ha Seung-jin | Center | Jeonju KCC Egis |
| 2009–10 | Park Sung-jin | Guard | Incheon Electroland Elephants |
| 2010–11 | Park Chan-hee^ | Guard | Anyang KGC (2) |
| 2011–12† | Oh Se-keun^ | Center | Anyang KGC (3) |
| 2012–13 | Choi Boo-kyung^ | Forward | Seoul SK Knights (3) |
| 2013–14 | Kim Jong-kyu^ | Center | Changwon LG Sakers (2) |
| 2014–15 | Lee Seoung-hyun^ | Forward | Goyang Orions (2) |
| 2015–16 | Jung Seong-woo^ | Guard | Changwon LG Sakers (3) |
| 2016–17 | Kang Sang-jae^ | Forward | Incheon Electroland Elephants (2) |
| 2017–18† | Ahn Young-joon^ | Forward | Seoul SK Knights (4) |
| 2018–19 | Byeon Jun-hyung^ | Guard | Anyang KGC (4) |
| 2019–20 (Note: The league was canceled in the middle of the fifth round of the regular season, due to the COVID-19 pandemic. The playoffs were also canceled as a result.) | Kim Hoon^ | Forward | Wonju DB Promy (4) |
| 2020–21 | Oh Jae-hyun^ | Guard | Seoul SK Knights (5) |
| 2021–22 | Lee Woo-suk^ | Guard | Ulsan Hyundai Mobis Phoebus (2) |
| 2022–23 | RJ Abarrientos | Guard | Ulsan Hyundai Mobis Phoebus (3) |
| 2024–25 | JD Cagulangan | Guard | Suwon KT Sonicboom |
| 2025–26 | Kevin Quiambao^ | Forward | Goyang Sono Skygunners (3) |

== Teams ==
| Awards | Teams | Years |
|---|---|---|
| 5 | Cheongju / Seoul SK Knights | 2006, 2008, 2013, 2018, 2021 |
| 4 | Wonju DB Promy (Note: Formerly Wonju TG Sambo Xers and Wonju Dongbu Promy) | 1998, 1999, 2003, 2000 |
| 4 | Anyang KT&G / KGC (Note: Formerly Anyang SBS Stars) | 2000, 2011, 2012, 2019 |
| 3 | Changwon LG Sakers | 2007, 2014, 2016 |
| 3 | Ulsan Hyundai Mobis Phoebus (Note: Formerly Busan Kia Enterprise and Ulsan Mobis Phoebus) | 2005, 2022, 2023 |
| 3 | Goyang Sono Skygunners (Note: Formerly Goyang Carrot Jumpers, Daegu Tongyang Orions, Daegu Orions and Goyang Orion Orions) | 2002, 2015, 2026 |
| 2 | Suwon / Seoul Samsung Thunders | 2001, 2004 |
| 2 | Daegu KOGAS Pegasus (Note: Formerly Incheon Electroland Elephants) | 2010, 2017 |
