= Chon Tae-poong =

South Korean entertainer and basketball player

- 전태풍
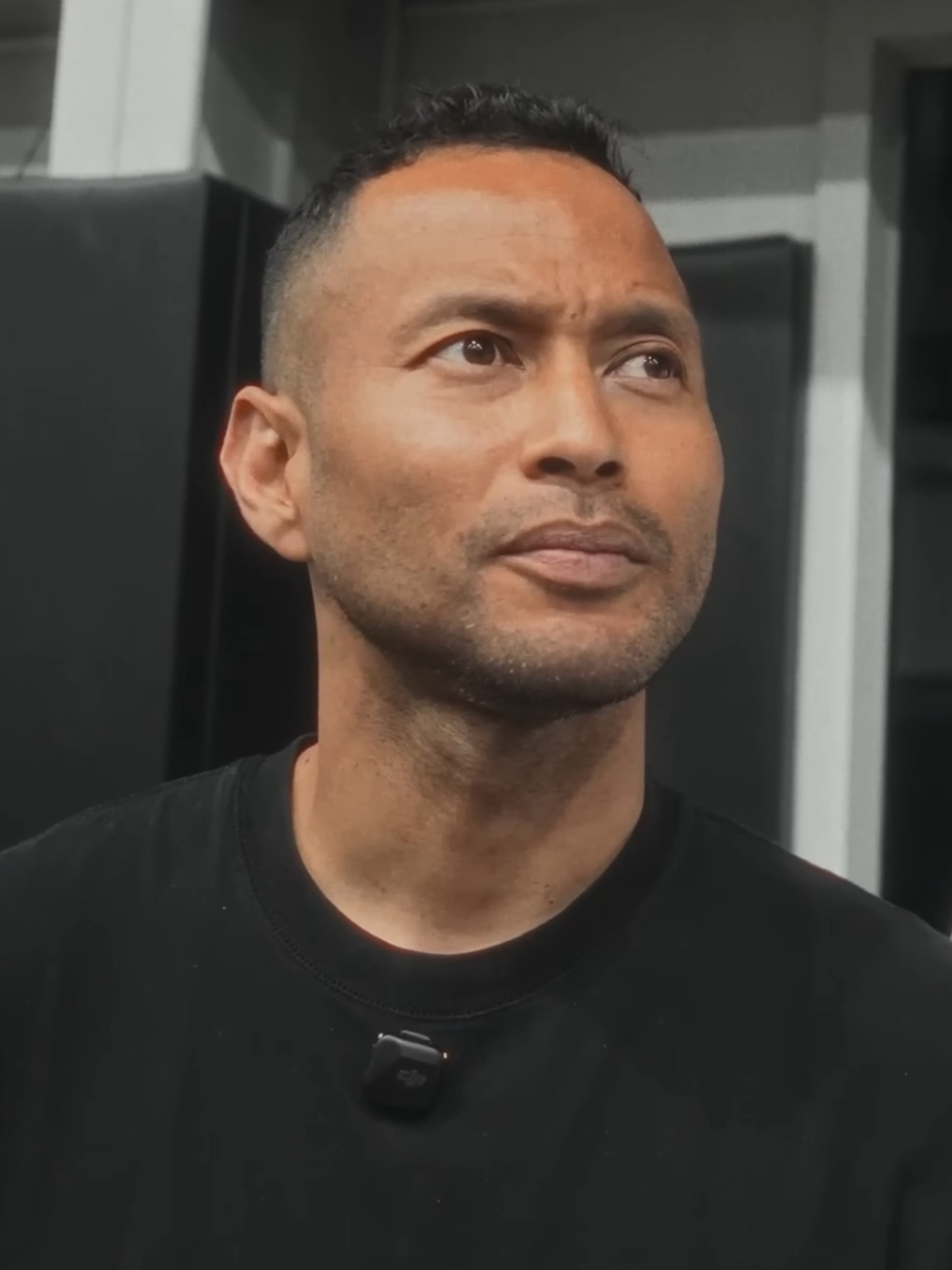
- Chon in 2025
- Born: Anthony Jewell Akins; July 3, 1980 (age 46); Detroit, Michigan, U.S.
- Other name: Tony Akins
- Citizenship: United States (until 2009); South Korea (from 2009)
- Occupations: YouTuber; entertainer; basketball player
- Spouse: Jane Mina Turner (m. 2010)
- Children: 3
- Relatives: Jaden Akins (nephew)
- Basketball career

Personal information
- Listed height: 179 cm (5 ft 10 in)
- Listed weight: 80 kg (176 lb)

Career information
- High school: Berkmar High School
- College: Georgia Tech
- Playing career: 2002–2020
- Position: Point guard
- Number: 3

Career history
- 2009–2012: Jeonju KCC Egis
- 2012–2013: Goyang Orions
- 2013–2015: Busan KT Sonicboom
- 2015–2019: Jeonju KCC Egis
- 2019–2020: Seoul SK Knights

Instagram information
- Page: 전태풍 Tony Akins
- Years active: 2015–present
- Followers: 16.4 thousand

YouTube information
- Channel: 전태풍 Taepoong Chon
- Years active: 2020–present
- Genre: Vlogging
- Subscribers: 221 thousand
- Views: 71 million
- Last updated: February 4, 2026

Chon Tae-poong (Note: Also transcribed as Jeon Tae-poong and Jeon Tae-pung) (Korean: 전태풍; born Anthony Jewell Akins, July 3, 1980) is an American-born South Korean YouTuber, entertainer, coach, and former basketball player. Born in the United States to an African‑American father and a Korean mother, he played for the Georgia Tech Yellow Jackets men's basketball team before starting a professional career in Europe and later in South Korea. Naturalized as a South Korean citizen in 2009, he changed his name and was selected first overall in the Korean Basketball League’s ethnic draft, winning the 2010–11 KBL championship with Jeonju KCC Egis. Known for his on‑court leadership and style as a point guard, he retired from basketball in 2020 and transitioned to broadcasting and online entertainment, appearing on variety programs and running a YouTube channel.

== Early life and education ==
Anthony Jewell Akins was born on July 3, 1980 in Detroit, Michigan to Jewell Akins, an African-American worker for General Motors, and a Myoung Akins, a Korean who was studying fashion in Detroit. He was influenced by his father to begin playing basketball at a young age as his father had played through college. His nephew is Jaden Akins, a basketball player who played with the Michigan State Spartans and signed with the Motor City Cruise in 2025. He lived with his maternal grandmother in Los Angeles while his parents worked and did not speak English, and at age six he was enrolled in a special school. As a multiracial child he faced social challenges and discrimination because of his skin color.

Akins tried out for his middle school boys' basketball team but was initially rejected and told to play with the girls. After proving himself to the girls' coach, he was invited to join the boys a week later. During a state final, an opposing fan shouted racial slurs at him. He graduated from Berkmar High School in Lilburn, Georgia, in 1998 being named Georgia Player of the Year. Although his father preferred that he attend a college in Michigan, he enrolled at the Georgia Institute of Technology and joined the Georgia Tech Yellow Jackets men's basketball program. Following a teammate's injury, he took a leading role but struggled with the team's low scoring and frustration against them. He contacted the University of Michigan, Michigan State University, and University of California, Los Angeles about transferring, but ultimately remained at Georgia Tech after being persuaded to stay by the Jackets' new coach, Paul Hewitt.

He held American nationality until 2009, when he relinquished it when he became a naturalized South Korean citizen. After his naturalization was approved, his name was legally changed from Anthony Jewell Akins to Chon Tae-poong. The surname Chon derives from his mother's family name, while Tae-poong (태풍), meaning "typhoon" in Korean, was suggested by a cousin who told him he would be able to "sweep the game like a typhoon."

== Basketball career ==
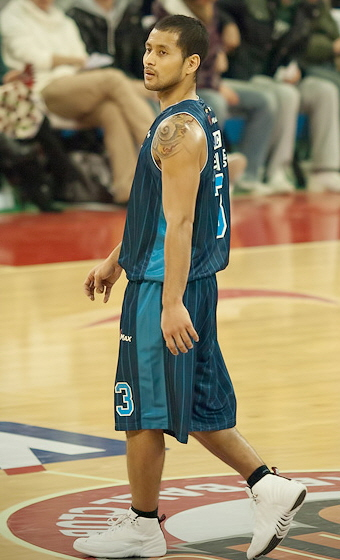
Chon playing with the Jeonju KCC Egis in 2010.

After leaving Georgia Tech, he did not qualify for the National Basketball Association and instead played professionally in Europe, where he was selected as an All‑Star in both the Polish and Croatian leagues.

After moving to South Korea, he attempted to join the Korean Basketball League as a foreign player but was not selected due to his height. Following his naturalization, the league established an ethnic draft, and in 2009, he was chosen first overall in that draft and added to the Jeonju KCC Egis roster. In his 2009–10 season with Jeonju KCC Egis, the team finished as runners-up to the champions. They went on to win the 2010–11 championship over Wonju DB Promy. Chon was recognized as the team's on‑court commander and was credited with reinvigorating the Egis' offense during the 2011–12 season, being regarded alongside Ha Seung-jin as one of the core players. In 2012, due to league regulations requiring naturalized players to change teams every three years, he was transferred to the Goyang Orions.

During his tenure with the Goyang Orions, he primarily played as a shooting guard, averaging roughly ten minutes per game. He saw limited court time and struggled to adapt to the team's system. In 2012, he was named to the preliminary roster for the South Korea men's national basketball team for the 2012 Summer Olympics, but an injury, diagnosed as Haglund's syndrome, prevented him from participating. A year later, he was traded to Busan KT Sonicboom, later stating that he wanted the move due to reduced playing time and expressed dissatisfaction with coach Il Seung‑choo's coaching style.

In 2015, he returned to Jeonju KCC Egis as a free agent, helping improve the team as a player‑coach. In 2019, free‑agent talks collapsed after he raised the possibility of a coaching role as team leaders said staff would be uncomfortable with it. Chon posted an SNS screenshot accusing the club of lying about negotiations and a false money‑demand rumor, saying the club claimed it offered ₩60 million while accusing him of asking ₩120 million, claims the team denied. Although he was on the verge of retirement by season's end, he signed with the Seoul SK Knights for the 2019–2020 season. The COVID-19 pandemic in South Korea led to the season's cancellation, and the 2020–2021 season was not played; Chon subsequently retired from professional basketball on March 24, 2020, without a retirement ceremony.

== Entertainment career ==
After retiring from professional basketball, he began a career in broadcasting and as a YouTuber. He appeared on several Korean variety shows and online channels, including My Golden Kids, Buddy Into the Wild, and Liberation Town. In March 2021, he appeared as a contestant on King of Mask Singer, performing "Train Heading for South" by Kim Soo-hee and "To the Fool ... From the Fool" by Park Myung-soo. On May 31, 2024, he appeared alongside Australian comedian Sam Hammington on the Korean variety show XYOB, with the episode accumulating 1.8 million views by July 2024. He returned to the program, retitled BYOB, on October 31, 2024, again appearing with Hammington.

== Personal life ==
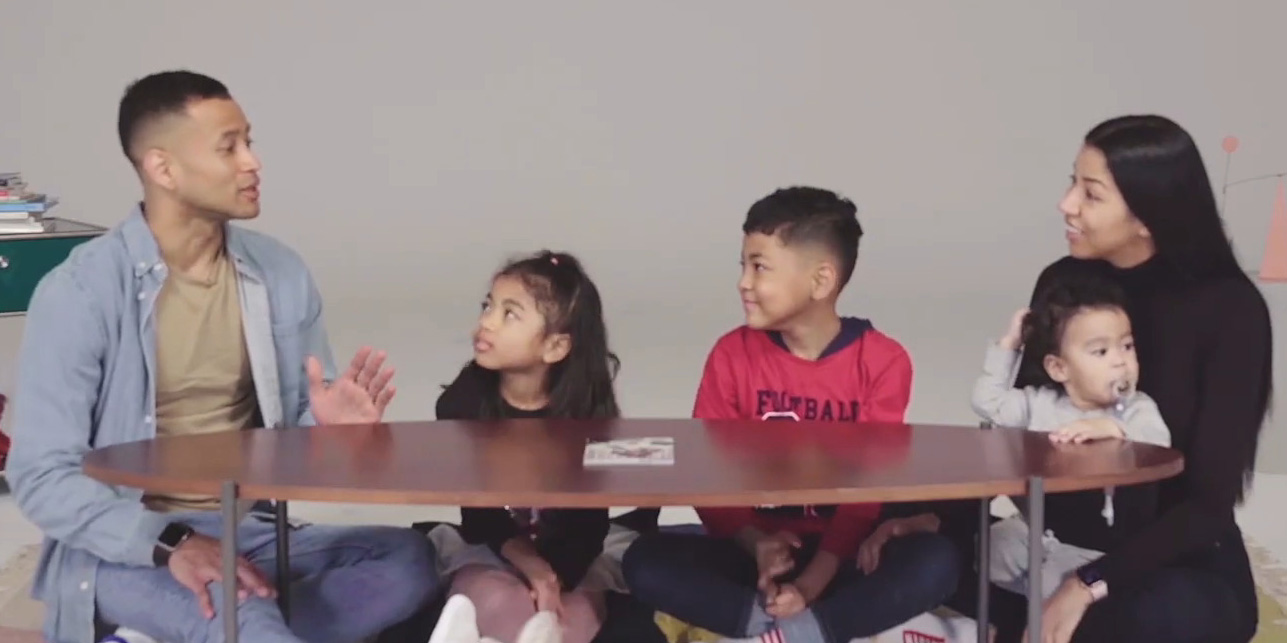
Chon with his wife, Jimina, and three children in 2021.

Chon met Jane Mina Turner, also known as Jimina (지미나) at age eight at a Korean church in Los Angeles and the two became friends. Although they drifted apart when Chon moved to Atlanta, they reconnected after Turner went to South Korea to teach English. Chon asked Turner out after he was drafted in 2009. They married in 2010 and have three children, two sons and a daughter.

In a 2026 episode of the Korean variety show Same Bed, Different Dreams 2: You Are My Destiny, Chon confessed that he had spent his entire 150 million won signing bonus within two months of debuting. He said he used the money to buy a Luxury SUV in cash, spend at clubs, and cover friends' drinks, and claimed he had purchased a car in part to attract women. During the episode, he also admitted to having spoken of divorce with Turner in a fit of anger, a remark he later said he reflected on over the following month.

== Career statistics ==
Legend
GP	Games played	MPG	Minutes per game	FG%	Field goal percentage
3P%	3-point field goal percentage	FT%	Free throw percentage	RPG	Rebounds per game
APG	Assists per game	SPG	Steals per game	BPG	Blocks per game
PPG	Points per game	**Bold**	Career high		Led the league

=== KBL ===
==== Regular season ====
Year	Team	League	GP	MPG	FG%	3P%	FT%	RPG	APG	SPG	BPG	PPG
2009–10	Jeonju KCC Egis	KBL	50	30.2	.475	.395	.791	2.7	4.7	**1.5**	0.1	14.4
2010–11	Jeonju KCC Egis	KBL	38	29.0	.449	.408	.860	2.3	4.9	**1.5**	0.1	12.2
2011–12	Jeonju KCC Egis	KBL	50	30.5	**.501**	**.412**	.814	2.8	5.0	1.3	0.1	**15.0**
2012–13	Goyang Orions	KBL	52	**32.1**	.448	.325	.758	2.3	**6.1**	1.4	0.1	12.3
2013–14	Goyang Orions	KBL	23	22.6	.461	.368	.804	1.7	2.8	1.0	0.0	10.7
2013–14	Busan KT Sonicboom	KBL	29	27.3	.396	.261	.697	2.9	4.6	0.9	0.1	8.1
2014–15	Busan KT Sonicboom	KBL	38	26.1	.438	.371	.807	2.8	3.9	1.0	0.0	11.1
2015–16	Jeonju KCC Egis	KBL	**53**	28.6	.418	.371	.883	2.6	2.7	0.8	0.1	11.0
2016–17	Jeonju KCC Egis	KBL	5	19.6	.351	.308	.800	3.8	2.4	0.8	0.0	6.8
2017–18	Jeonju KCC Egis	KBL	35	20.8	.466	.397	**.889**	2.0	3.5	1.0	0.1	7.7
2018–19	Jeonju KCC Egis	KBL	22	12.8	.342	.241	.826	1.6	1.8	0.8	0.0	3.5
2019–20	Seoul SK Knights	KBL	30	11.0	.385	.262	.818	1.6	2.1	0.4	0.0	**3.8**
**Career**			425	26:21	.449	.367	.813	2.4	4.0	1.1	0.1	10.7

== Awards and honors ==
International

- 2008 Croatian League Assists
- 2007 Poland-DBL Assists

KBL

- 2009–10 KBL Best 5
- 2011 KBL Finals
- 2013 KBL Playoff Champion

College

- 2001 All-ACC Honorable Mention
- 2002 All-ACC Second Team

High school

- 1998 Mr. Georgia Basketball award

== Filmography ==
=== Television ===
Year	Title	Role	Notes
2020	Radio Star	Himself	Episode 667
2020	My Golden Kids	Himself	Episode 17
2020	Sporty Sisters	Himself	Episodes 17 and 18
2020	Cashback	Himself	Episode 2, pilot episode
2021	King of Mask Singer	Contestant (as Oh, My!)	Episode: "150th Generation Mask King"
2021–2022	Sporty Brothers	Host/Himself	Regular cast
2021	Sporty Sisters	Himself	Episode 45
2021	Buddy Into The Wild	Himself	Episodes 50 and 51
2021	No Pain No Delish	Himself	Episode 9
2022	The King of Ssireum	Himself	Regular cast
2022	Super DNA – Blood Can't Cheat	Himself	Episode 8
2023	Rice Planting Club	Himself	Episode 7
2023	United Feathers	Himself	Episode 33
2023	Saturday Night Live Korea	Neymar	Episode 4
2023	Mr. House Husband	Himself	Episode 317
2023	Radio Star	Himself	Episode 840
2024	Knowing Bros	Himself	Episode 433
2024	The Burning Roses	Himself	Episode 57
2024	XYOB	Himself	Episode 10
2024	XYOB	Co-host	Episode 15, substituting for Joon Park
2024	The Influencer	Himself	Regular cast
2024	BYOB	Himself	Episode 5
2025	Knowing Bros	Himself	Episode 508
2025–2026	Rising Eagles	Himself	Regular cast
2026	Same Bed, Different Dreams 2: You Are My Destiny	Himself	
