= 2023–24 KBL season =

- League: Korean Basketball League
- Duration: 21 October 2023 – 5 May 2024
- Games: 54 per team (regular season)
- Teams: 10
- TV partner: SPOTV

Playoffs

Finals
- Champions: Busan KCC Egis (6th title)
- Runners-up: Suwon KT Sonicboom
- Finals MVP: Heo Ung (Busan)

Seasons
- ← 2022–23 2024–25 →

The 2023–24 KBL season is the 28th season of the Korean Basketball League (KBL), the highest level of basketball in South Korea. The regular season began on 21 October 2023.

The Anyang Jung Kwan Jang Red Boosters were the defending champions, having won their fourth KBL title after defeating the Seoul SK Knights in the 2023 finals, but were eliminated in the semi-finals. The Busan KCC Egis won their sixth championship after defeating Suwon KT Sonicboom in the finals, becoming the first fifth-seeded team to win the championship.

The Busan KCC Egis qualified for the 2024 Basketball Champions League Asia and both the champions and runners-up qualified for the 2024–25 East Asia Super League.

== Teams ==
=== Changes from last season ===
- Anyang KGC was rebranded Anyang Jung Kwan Jang Red Boosters.
- Jeonju KCC Egis relocated to Busan and was rebranded Busan KCC Egis.
- Goyang Carrot Jumpers was rebranded Goyang Sono Skygunners after ownership was transferred to hospitality company Sono International.

=== Venues and locations ===
Team	City	Arena	Capacity	Founded	Joined
Anyang Jung Kwan Jang Red Boosters	Anyang	Anyang Gymnasium	6,690	1992	1997
Busan KCC Egis	Busan	Sajik Arena	14,099	1977	1997
Changwon LG Sakers	Changwon	Changwon Gymnasium	6,000	1994	1997
Daegu KOGAS Pegasus	Daegu	Daegu Gymnasium	3,867	1994	1997
Goyang Sono Skygunners	Goyang	Goyang Gymnasium	6,216	1996	1997
Seoul Samsung Thunders	Seoul	Jamsil Arena	11,069	1978	1997
Seoul SK Knights	Seoul	Jamsil Students' Gymnasium	6,229	1997	
Suwon KT Sonicboom	Suwon	Suwon KT Sonicboom Arena	3,339	1997	
Ulsan Hyundai Mobis Phoebus	Ulsan	Dongchun Gymnasium	5,831	1986	1997
Wonju DB Promy	Wonju	Wonju Gymnasium	4,600	1996	1997

== Regular season ==
=== League table ===
Pos	Team	Pld	W	L	PCT	Qualification or relegation
1	Wonju DB Promy	54	41	13	.759	Qualification to semi-finals
2	Changwon LG Sakers	54	36	18	.667	Qualification to semi-finals
3	Suwon KT Sonicboom	54	33	21	.611	Qualification to quarter-finals
4	Seoul SK Knights	54	31	23	.574	Qualification to quarter-finals
5	Busan KCC Egis	54	30	24	.556	Qualification to quarter-finals
6	Ulsan Hyundai Mobis Phoebus	54	26	28	.481	Qualification to quarter-finals
7	Daegu KOGAS Pegasus	54	21	33	.389	
8	Goyang Sono Skygunners	54	20	34	.370	
9	Anyang Jung Kwan Jang Red Boosters	54	18	36	.333	
10	Seoul Samsung Thunders	54	14	40	.259	

Source: KBL

=== Results ===
==== Games 1–90 ====
Home \ Away	JKJ	KCC	CLG	DKG	GSS	SST	SSK	SKT	UHM	WDB
Anyang Jung Kwan Jang Red Boosters		74–72	85–71	80–91	82–84	84–75	74–89	85–94	75–86	80–97
Busan KCC Egis				81–96	78–69	106–100	74–77	71–85	91–84	94–88
Changwon LG Sakers	94–75	104–84		77–62	87–73	93–75	69–50	66–71	97–76	76–85
Daegu KOGAS Pegasus	80–91	90–96	83–92		90–100	107–82	96–94	81–99	83–90	79–94
Goyang Sono Skygunners	86–82	93–84		74–80		67–86	79–90		99–88	89–110
Seoul Samsung Thunders	74–96		69–90	84–80	98–78		80–82	87–90	66–80	73–87
Seoul SK Knights	59–63	72–74	73–87		87–61	82–75		85–80	75–74	84–91
Suwon KT Sonicboom		98–83	93–88	91–69	101–65	88–83	87–102			71–87
Ulsan Hyundai Mobis Phoebus	93–78	79–91	76–74	87–62	66–71	77–69	78–67	61–77		79–90
Wonju DB Promy	94–99	101–90	70–91	88–74	88–94	94–58	91–82	106–76	81–72	

Updated to match(es) played on 8 January 2024. Source: Results
Legend: Blue = home team win; Red = away team win.
Matches with lighter background shading were decided after overtime.

==== Games 91–180 ====
Home \ Away	JKJ	KCC	CLG	DKG	GSS	SST	SSK	SKT	UHM	WDB
Anyang Jung Kwan Jang Red Boosters		84–74	77–106				68–86	85–113	77–108	86–93
Busan KCC Egis				93–88	69–61	77–74	90–75		91–86	
Changwon LG Sakers		85–81			80–49		62–64	84–76	90–79	
Daegu KOGAS Pegasus	93–98		88–69			77–71	74–76	75–85		72–85
Goyang Sono Skygunners	85–81			76–84			84–77		72–92	91–99
Seoul Samsung Thunders	63–81		82–95	84–63	64–78		76–80	61–103		
Seoul SK Knights	85–71					89–74			85–77	86–80
Suwon KT Sonicboom		83–80			86–81	94–99	71–85			
Ulsan Hyundai Mobis Phoebus		81–84	80–88	81–80		102–85	75–78	94–74		
Wonju DB Promy	88–83	87–85	91–75			102–73		82–90	102–92	

Updated to match(es) played on 11 January 2024. Source: Results
Legend: Blue = home team win; Red = away team win.
Matches with lighter background shading were decided after overtime.

==== Games 181–270 ====
Home \ Away	JKJ	KCC	CLG	DKG	GSS	SST	SSK	SKT	UHM	WDB
Anyang Jung Kwan Jang Red Boosters		75–104	84–80							
Busan KCC Egis					83–74					
Changwon LG Sakers		91–95			79–72		57–64			
Daegu KOGAS Pegasus	81–70						69–81	70–80		
Goyang Sono Skygunners										58–92
Seoul Samsung Thunders										
Seoul SK Knights	83–71				82–64					
Suwon KT Sonicboom										
Ulsan Hyundai Mobis Phoebus								83–82		
Wonju DB Promy						91–67		94–86		

Updated to match(es) played on 9 January 2024. Source: Results
Legend: Blue = home team win; Red = away team win.
Matches with lighter background shading were decided after overtime.

== Playoffs ==
The playoffs began on 4 April 2024 and ended on 5 May 2024.

Quarterfinals
4	Seoul	0
5	Busan	3
3	Suwon	3
6	Mobis	1

Semifinals
1	Wonju	1
5	Busan	3
2	Changwon	2
3	Suwon	3

Finals
5	Busan	4
3	Suwon	1

== Statistics ==
=== Individual statistic leaders ===
Category	Player	Team	Statistics
PPG(O)	(United States) Paris Bass	Suwon KT Sonicboom	26.0
PPG(D)	Lee Jung-hyun	Goyang Sono Skygunners	22.8
RPG(O)	(Egypt) Assem Marei	Changwon LG Sakers	14.4
RPG(D)	Ha Yoon-gi	Suwon KT Sonicboom	6.7
APG	Lee Jung-hyun	Goyang Sono Skygunners	6.6
SPG	(South Korea) Lee Jung-hyun	Goyang Sono Skygunners	2.0
BPG	(United States) Du'Vaughn Maxwell	Daegu KOGAS Pegasus	1.3
FG%	Ra Gun-ah	Suwon KT Sonicboom	60.6%
FT%	(South Korea) Choi Sung-won	Anyang Jung Kwan Jang Red Boosters	89.1%
3FG%	(South Korea) Yoo Ki-sang	Changwon LG Sakers	42.4%

=== Team statistic leaders ===
Category	Team	Statistic
Points per game	Wonju DB Promy	91.2
Rebounds per game	Changwon LG Sakers	38.7
Assists per game	Wonju DB Promy	21.0
Steals per game	Suwon KT Sonicboom	8.5
Blocks per game	Wonju DB Promy	3.5
FG%	Wonju DB Promy	50.8%
3FG%	Wonju DB Promy	37.5%
FT%	Wonju DB Promy	77.7%

== Korean clubs in Asian competitions ==
Team	Competition	Progress
Anyang Jung Kwan Jang Red Boosters	East Asia Super League	Runners-up
Seoul SK Knights	East Asia Super League	Third place
