= Korean Basketball League ethnic draft =

Draft for foreign, mixed Korean ethnicity players

The Korean Basketball League Ethnic Draft was first established in 2009 to give mixed blood Korean basketball players of foreign nationality a chance to play in the KBL without being counted as foreigners. The first draft was held on 3 February 2009 and it resulted in five out of seven applicants being picked. The following year, another draft was held but only one player was selected.

== Rules ==
Each team is allowed to have only one player from the ethnic draft at any given time. The drafted players can play a maximum of three years with the KBL team that drafted them.

== 2009 Draft Picks ==
Pick	Name	Team
1	Tony Akins (Chon Tae-poong)	Jeonju KCC Egis
2	Eric Sandrin (Lee Seung-Jun)	Seoul Samsung Thunders
3	Greg Stevenson (Moon Tae Young)	Changwon LG Sakers
4	Kevin Mitchell (Won Ha Jun)	KT&G Kites
5	Chris Vann (Park Tae Yang)	Busan KT Sonicboom

== 2010 Draft Picks ==
Pick	Name	Team
1	Jarod Stevenson (Moon Tae-Jong)	Incheon ET Land Elephants

== 2011 Draft Picks ==
The third Ethnic Draft was held on 31 January 2011. However, none of the eligible candidates were picked. Adrian Scott, Larry Boyd, Joseph Fontenot, and Anthony Gallagher were the eligible players.
