= 2024–25 KBL season =

- League: Korean Basketball League
- Duration: 19 October 2024 – 15 May 2025
- Games: 54 per team (regular season)
- Teams: 10
- TV partner(s): tvN Sports; IB SPORTS; TVING

Playoffs

Finals
- Champions: Changwon LG Sakers (1st title)
- Runners-up: Seoul SK Knights
- Finals MVP: Heo Il-young (Changwon)

Seasons
- ← 2023–24 2025–26 →

The 2024–25 KBL season is the 29th season of the Korean Basketball League (KBL), the highest level of basketball in South Korea. The regular season began on 19 October 2024.

The Busan KCC Egis were the defending champions, having won their sixth KBL title after defeating the Suwon KT Sonicboom in the previous season, but were eliminated in the regular season.The Changwon LG Sakers won their first championship in its 28-year history after defeating Seoul SK Knights in the finals.

The Changwon LG Sakers qualified for the 2025 Basketball Champions League Asia and both the champions and runners-up qualified for the 2025–26 East Asia Super League.

== Teams ==
=== Venues and locations ===
Team	City	Arena	Capacity	Founded	Joined
Anyang Jung Kwan Jang Red Boosters	Anyang	Anyang Gymnasium	6,690	1992	1997
Busan KCC Egis	Busan	Sajik Arena	14,099	1977	1997
Changwon LG Sakers	Changwon	Changwon Gymnasium	6,000	1994	1997
Daegu KOGAS Pegasus	Daegu	Daegu Gymnasium	3,867	1994	1997
Goyang Sono Skygunners	Goyang	Goyang Gymnasium	6,216	1996	1997
Seoul Samsung Thunders	Seoul	Jamsil Arena	11,069	1978	1997
Seoul SK Knights	Seoul	Jamsil Students' Gymnasium	6,229	1997	
Suwon KT Sonicboom	Suwon	Suwon KT Sonicboom Arena	3,339	1997	
Ulsan Hyundai Mobis Phoebus	Ulsan	Dongchun Gymnasium	5,831	1986	1997
Wonju DB Promy	Wonju	Wonju Gymnasium	4,600	1996	1997

== Foreign players ==
This is the full list of international players competing in the 2024–25 season. Each team is allowed to register two foreign + 1 Asian quota players.

Team	Foreign 1	Foreign 2	Asian 1
Anyang Jung Kwan Jang Red Boosters	(United States) Deonte Burton	(United States) Johnny O'Bryant	(Philippines) Javi Gómez de Liaño
Busan KCC Egis	(Haiti) Cady Lalanne	(United States) Donovan Smith	(Philippines) Calvin Epistola
Changwon LG Sakers	(Egypt) Assem Marei	(United States) Darryl Monroe	(Philippines) Carl Tamayo
Daegu KOGAS Pegasus	(Senegal) Youssou Ndoye	(Canada) Andrew Nicholson	(Philippines) SJ Belangel
Goyang Sono Skygunners	(United States) D. J. Burns	(United States) Alan Williams	(Philippines) Kevin Quiambao
Seoul Samsung Thunders	(Jamaica) Kofi Cockburn	(United States) Glenn Robinson	(Philippines) Justin Gutang
Seoul SK Knights	(United States) Isaiah Hicks	(United States) Jameel Warney	(Philippines) Juan Gómez de Liaño
Suwon KT Sonicboom	(United States) Derek Culver	(United States) Rayshaun Hammonds	(Philippines) JD Cagulangan
Ulsan Hyundai Mobis Phoebus	(United States) Shawn Long	(United States) Gaige Prim	(Philippines) Miguel Oczon
Wonju DB Promy	(United States) Chinanu Onuaku	(Lebanon) Omari Spellman	(Philippines) Ethan Alvano

== Regular season ==
The regular season began on 19 October 2024. Every team will play 54 games, playing each team 6 times. The top two teams at the end of the regular season earn a direct berth to the semifinals, while teams three through six qualify for the quarter-finals.

=== League table ===
Pos	Team	Pld	W	L	PCT	Qualification or relegation
1	Seoul SK Knights	54	41	13	.759	Qualification to semi-finals
2	Changwon LG Sakers	54	34	20	.630	Qualification to semi-finals
3	Ulsan Hyundai Mobis Phoebus	54	33	21	.611	Qualification to quarter-finals
4	Suwon KT Sonicboom	54	33	21	.611	Qualification to quarter-finals
5	Daegu KOGAS Pegasus	54	28	26	.519	Qualification to quarter-finals
6	Anyang Jung Kwan Jang Red Boosters	54	25	29	.463	Qualification to quarter-finals
7	Wonju DB Promy	54	23	31	.426	
8	Goyang Sono Skygunners	54	19	35	.352	
9	Busan KCC Egis	54	18	36	.333	
10	Seoul Samsung Thunders	54	16	38	.296	

Source: KBL

=== Statistics ===
==== Individual statistic leaders ====
Category	Player	Team	Statistics
PPG(O)	(United States) Jameel Warney	Seoul SK Knights	22.6
PPG(D)	Lee Jung-hyun	Goyang Sono Skygunners	16.8
RPG(O)	(Egypt) Assem Marei	Changwon LG Sakers	13.1
RPG(D)	Kang Sang-jae	Wonju DB Promy	7.3
APG	(South Korea) Heo Hoon	Suwon KT Sonicboom	6.2
SPG	(South Korea) Lee Jung-hyun	Goyang Sono Skygunners	1.9
BPG	(Haiti) Cady Lalanne	Busan KCC Egis	1.2
FG%	(United States) Shawn Long	Ulsan Hyundai Mobis Phoebus	60.8%
FT%	(South Korea) Lee Jung-hyun	Goyang Sono Skygunners	88.8%
3FG%	(South Korea) Lee Geun-hwi	Busan KCC Egis	42.5%

==== Team statistic leaders ====
Category	Team	Statistic
Points per game	Ulsan Hyundai Mobis Phoebus	81.2
Rebounds per game	Suwon KT Sonicboom	38.2
Assists per game	Ulsan Hyundai Mobis Phoebus	20.9
Steals per game	Seoul SK Knights	7.9
Blocks per game	Anyang Jung Kwan Jang Red Boosters	3.3
FG%	Busan KCC Egis	45.9%
3FG%	Busan KCC Egis	34.0%
FT%	Daegu KOGAS Pegasus	75.9%

== Playoffs ==
The playoffs began on 12 April 2025 and ended on 15 May 2025.

Quarterfinals
4	Suwon	3
5	Daegu	2
3	Ulsan	3
6	Anyang	0

Semifinals
1	Seoul	3
4	Suwon	1
2	Changwon	3
3	Ulsan	0

Finals
1	Seoul	3
2	Changwon	4

== Korean clubs in Asian competitions ==
Team	Competition	Progress
Busan KCC Egis	East Asia Super League	Group stage
Suwon KT Sonicboom	East Asia Super League	Group stage
