= 2013–14 KBL season =

- League: KBL
- Sport: Basketball
- Duration: October 2013 – April 2014

2013-14
- Season MVP: (South Korea) Moon Tae-young (Mobis)
- Top scorer: (United States) Tyler Wilkerson (KCC)

Finals
- Champions: Ulsan Mobis Phoebus
- Runners-up: Changwon LG Sakers

KBL seasons
- ← 2012–13 2014–15 →

The 2013–14 KBL season was the 18th season of the Korean Basketball League (KBL), the highest level of basketball in South Korea. Ulsan Hyundai Mobis Phoebus retained their title, their fifth overall.

== Clubs ==
Team	City	Arena	Capacity	Founded	Joined
Anyang KGC	Anyang	Anyang Gymnasium	6,690	1992	1997
Busan KT Sonicboom	Busan	Sajik Arena	14,099	1997	1997
Changwon LG Sakers	Changwon	Changwon Gymnasium	6,000	1994	1997
Goyang Orion Orions	Goyang	Goyang Gymnasium	6,216	1995	1997
Incheon Electroland Elephants	Incheon	Samsan World Gymnasium	7,220	1994	1997
Jeonju KCC Egis	Jeonju	Jeonju Gymnasium	4,730	1977	1997
Seoul Samsung Thunders	Seoul	Jamsil Arena	11,069	1978	1997
Seoul SK Knights	Seoul	Jamsil Students' Gymnasium	6,229	1997	1997
Ulsan Hyundai Mobis Phoebus	Ulsan	Dongchun Gymnasium	5,831	1986	1997
Wonju DB Promy	Wonju	Wonju Gymnasium	4,600	1996	1997

== Regular season ==
Pos	Team	Pld	W	L	Pts	Qualification
1	Changwon LG Sakers	54	40	14	0.741	Qualification to Semi-Finals
2	Ulsan Hyundai Mobis Phoebus	54	40	14	0.741	Qualification to Semi-Finals
3	Seoul SK Knights	54	37	17	0.685	Qualification to Quarter-Finals
4	Incheon Electroland Elephants	54	28	26	0.519	Qualification to Quarter-Finals
5	Busan KT Sonicboom	54	27	27	0.500	Qualification to Quarter-Finals
6	Goyang Orion Orions	54	27	27	0.500	Qualification to Quarter-Finals
7	Jeonju KCC Egis	54	20	34	0.370	
8	Seoul Samsung Thunders	54	19	35	0.352	
9	Anyang KGC	54	19	35	0.352	
10	Wonju DB Promy	54	13	41	0.241	

== Playoffs ==
Quarter-finals
4 Incheon Electroland Elephants	1
5 Busan KT Sonicboom	4
3 Seoul SK Knights	3
6 Goyang Orion Orions	1

Semi-finals
1 Changwon LG Sakers	3
5 Busan KT Sonicboom	0
2 Ulsan Hyundai Mobis Phoebus	3
3 Seoul SK Knights	1

Final
1 Changwon LG Sakers	2
2 Ulsan Hyundai Mobis Phoebus	4
