= BYOB (disambiguation) =

BYOB is an initialism used on party invitations, meaning "bring your own beverage" or variants. BYOB may also refer to:

- B.Y.O.B. (song), a song by System of a Down from their album Mezmerize
- BYOB (programming language), a computer programming language
- Bring your own bag, a government campaign to discourage plastic shopping bag use
- Build Your Own Browser, a discontinued project from Mozilla, that ran from September 2009 to June 2012. It let people build customized versions of the Firefox web browser.
- BYOB (web series), South Korean variety show produced by Samyang Foods
