= Assem Marei =

Egyptian basketball player

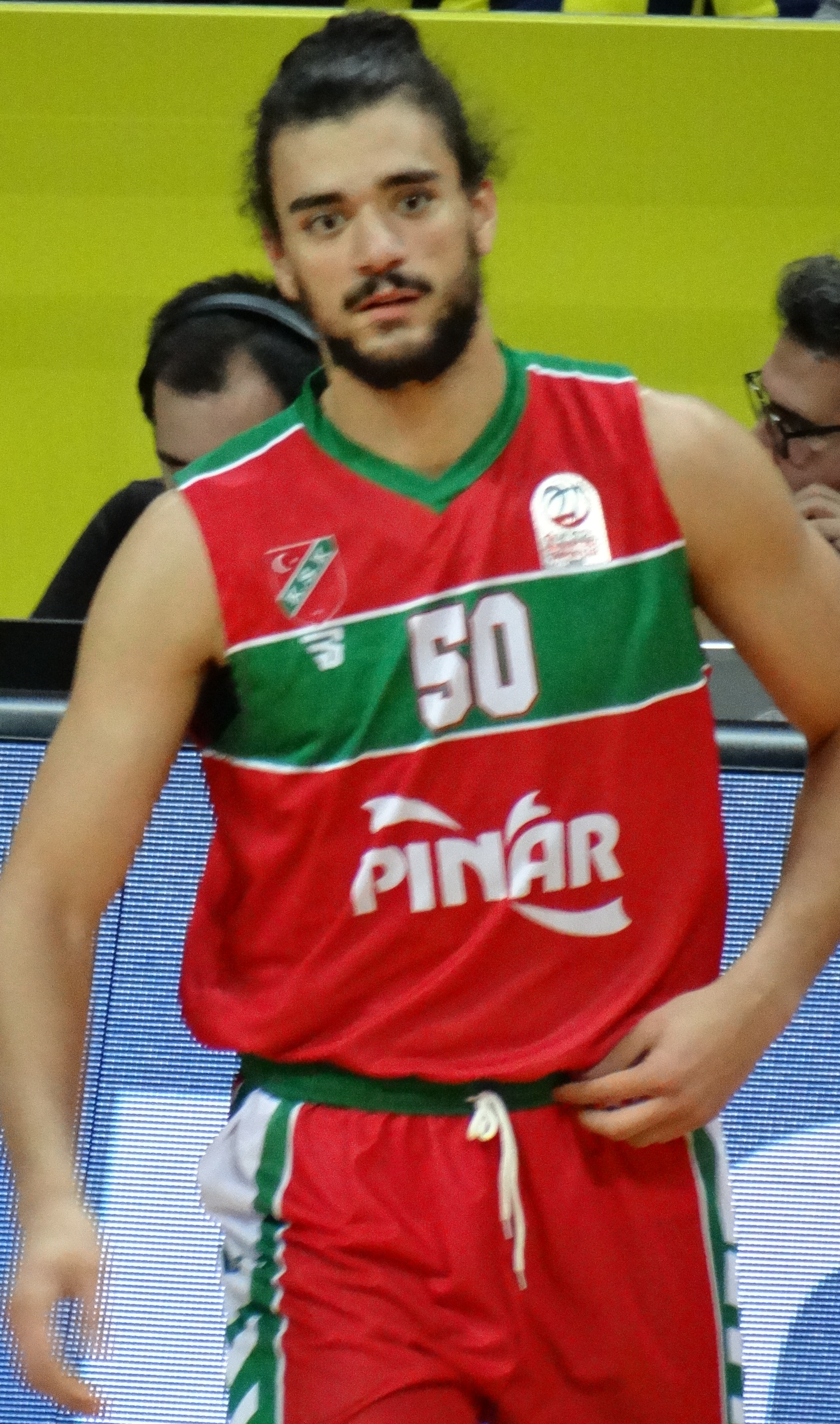
- Marei with Pınar Karşıyaka in 2018

No. 50 – Changwon LG Sakers
- Position: Center
- League: Korean Basketball League

Personal information
- Born: 16 June 1992 (age 34) Giza, Egypt
- Listed height: 2.06 m (6 ft 9 in)
- Listed weight: 113 kg (249 lb)

Career information
- College: Minnesota State (2011–2015)
- NBA draft: 2015: undrafted
- Playing career: 2015–present

Career history
- 2010–2011: Zamalek SC
- 2015–2016: Šiauliai
- 2016–2018: Medi Bayreuth
- 2018–2019: Karşıyaka
- 2019–2020: Brose Bamberg
- 2020: Metropolitans 92
- 2020–2021: Galatasaray
- 2021–2025: Changwon LG Sakers
- 2025–2026: Al Ahli Tripoli
- 2026–present: Changwon LG Sakers

Career highlights
- BAL champion (2025); BAL rebounding leader (2025); KBL champion (2025); Turkish League MVP (2019); FIBA Europe Cup rebounding leader (2019); BBL All-Star (2018); Lithuanian League rebounding leader (2016); BBL champion (2016)

Assem Ahmed Marei (Arabic: عاصم مرعي) is an Egyptian professional basketball player for the Changwon LG Sakers of the Korean Basketball League (KBL). He played college basketball for the Minnesota State Mavericks in the NCAA Division II. Marei also represents the Egyptian national team internationally.

Marei first played for Egyptian side Zamalek SC, before being recognized by other leagues at the FIBA U-19 world Championship. He averaged 3rd most points per game, most steals per game, and 2nd most rebounds in the tournament right after Jonas Valančiūnas.

== Early life ==
Marei was born on 16 June 1992, from parents who were both former basketball players at Zamalek SC. His father, Ahmed Marei, who played pivot as well, competed for the Egyptian Olympic team at the 1984 Los Angeles Olympics and averaged 2.3 points per game.

Marei started playing basketball at the age of 8 after his father encouraged both him and his brother to play the sport. Marei joined the national team at the age of 16.

== Professional career ==
=== Zamalek SC (2010–2011) ===
Marei played for his home club Zamalek until 2011, when he left for the Minnesota State University.

=== Šiauliai (2015–2016) ===
In September 2015, Marei signed with BC Šiauliai of the Lithuanian LKL.

=== Medi Bayreuth (2016–2018) ===
On 17 June 2016, Marei signed with Medi Bayreuth of the German Basketball Bundesliga (BBL). He re-signed with the team on 22 May 2017.

=== Pınar Karşıyaka (2018–2019) ===
On 19 July 2018, Marei signed with Pınar Karşıyaka of the Turkish Basketball Super League (BSL). He was named the Most Valuable Player of the 2018–19 season after averaging 17.4 points and 9.6 rebounds in the regular season.

=== Bamberg (2019–2020) ===
On 21 July 2019, Marei signed a two-year contract with German powerhouse Brose Bamberg. Marei averaged 10.1 points and 6.0 rebounds per game.

=== Metropolitans 92 (2020) ===
On 21 September 2020, Marei signed with Metropolitans 92 of LNB Pro A.

=== Galatasaray (2020–2021) ===
On 29 December 2020, Marei signed with Galatasaray of the Turkish Basketball Super League (BSL).

=== Changwon LG Sakers (2021–2025) ===
On 17 June 2021, Marei signed with Changwon LG Sakers of the Korean Basketball League (KBL). He helped Changwon win the 2024–25 KBL season championship, the first title in the team's 28-year history.

=== Al Ahli Tripoli (2025–present) ===
In May 2025, Marei joined the Libyan champions Al Ahli Tripoli for the Basketball Africa League (BAL). He helped Al Ahli win its first ever BAL championship. On 14 June 2025, Marei played a crucial role in the championship game, as he had a double-double of 22 points and 19 rebounds in the final game against Petro de Luanda. He also finished the season as the league's leading rebounder with 12.4 per game.

== International career ==
Marei played at the AfroBasket 2011, 2013 and 2015 with Egypt.

Marei led the AfroBasket 2013 in rebounding, averaging 11.6 per game. He was also named to the AfroBasket All-Tournament Team.

== Honours ==
=== Egyptian senior national team ===
- AfroBasket 2013 All-Tournament Team
- AfroBasket 2013 Rebounding leader

=== Egyptian junior national team ===
- 2011 U-19 World championship Steals leader

=== NSIC ===
2012–13 season

- Second Team All-NSIC, NSIC All-Tournament Team, NCAA All-Central Region Team, 2012 NSIC Winter All-Academic Team

2013–14 season

- First Team All-NSIC, DII Bulletin All-American Honorable Mention, NSIC All-Tournament Team

2014–15 season

- First Team All-NSIC, Daktronics Central Region First Team, NABC Central Region First Team
