= 2015–16 KBL season =

- League: KBL League
- Season: 2015–16
- Dates: October 2015 – April 2016

The 2015–16 KBL season was the 20th season of the Korean Basketball League (KBL), the highest level of basketball in South Korea. Goyang Orion Orions won its first KBL championship since the 2001–2002 season.

== Clubs ==
Team	City	Arena	Capacity	Founded	Joined
Anyang KGC	Anyang	Anyang Gymnasium	6,690	1992	1997
Busan KT Sonicboom	Busan	Sajik Arena	14,099	1997	1997
Changwon LG Sakers	Changwon	Changwon Gymnasium	6,000	1994	1997
Goyang Orion Orions	Goyang	Goyang Gymnasium	6,216	1995	1997
Incheon Electroland Elephants	Incheon	Samsan World Gymnasium	7,220	1994	1997
Jeonju KCC Egis	Jeonju	Jeonju Gymnasium	4,730	1977	1997
Seoul Samsung Thunders	Seoul	Jamsil Arena	11,069	1978	1997
Seoul SK Knights	Seoul	Jamsil Students' Gymnasium	6,229	1997	1997
Ulsan Hyundai Mobis Phoebus	Ulsan	Dongchun Gymnasium	5,831	1986	1997
Wonju DB Promy	Wonju	Wonju Gymnasium	4,600	1996	1997

== Regular season ==
Pos	Team	Pld	W	L	Pts	Qualification
1	Jeonju KCC Egis	54	36	18	0.667	Qualification to Semi-Finals
2	Ulsan Hyundai Mobis Phoebus	54	36	18	0.667	Qualification to Semi-Finals
3	Goyang Orion Orions	54	32	22	0.593	Qualification to Quarter-Finals
4	Anyang KGC	54	30	24	0.556	Qualification to Quarter-Finals
5	Seoul Samsung Thunders	54	29	25	0.537	Qualification to Quarter-Finals
6	Wonju DB Promy	54	26	28	0.481	Qualification to Quarter-Finals
7	Busan KT Sonicboom	54	23	31	0.426	
8	Changwon LG Sakers	54	21	33	0.389	
9	Seoul SK Knights	54	20	34	0.370	
10	Incheon Electroland Elephants	54	17	37	0.315	

== Playoffs ==
Quarter-finals
4 Anyang KGC	3
5 Seoul Samsung Thunders	1
3 Goyang Orion Orions	3
6 Wonju DB Promy	0

Semi-finals
1 Jeonju KCC Egis	3
4 Anyang KGC	1
2 Ulsan Hyundai Mobis Phoebus	0
3 Goyang Orion Orions	3

Final
1 Jeonju KCC Egis	2
3 Goyang Orion Orions	4
