= 2012–13 KBL season =

- League: KBL
- Sport: Basketball
- Duration: October 2012 – April 2013

2012-13
- Season MVP: (South Korea) Yang Dong-geun (Mobis)
- Top scorer: (United States) Jasper Johnson (Busan)

Finals
- Champions: Ulsan Mobis Phoebus
- Runners-up: Seoul SK Knights

KBL seasons
- ← 2011–12 2013–14 →

The 2012–13 KBL season was the 18th season of the Korean Basketball League (KBL), the highest level of basketball in South Korea. Ulsan Hyundai Mobis Phoebus won the title for the fourth time.

== Clubs ==
Team	City	Arena	Capacity	Founded	Joined
Anyang KGC	Anyang	Anyang Gymnasium	6,690	1992	1997
Busan KT Sonicboom	Busan	Sajik Arena	14,099	1997	1997
Changwon LG Sakers	Changwon	Changwon Gymnasium	6,000	1994	1997
Goyang Orion Orions	Goyang	Goyang Gymnasium	6,216	1995	1997
Incheon Electroland Elephants	Incheon	Samsan World Gymnasium	7,220	1994	1997
Jeonju KCC Egis	Jeonju	Jeonju Gymnasium	4,730	1977	1997
Seoul Samsung Thunders	Seoul	Jamsil Arena	11,069	1978	1997
Seoul SK Knights	Seoul	Jamsil Students' Gymnasium	6,229	1997	1997
Ulsan Hyundai Mobis Phoebus	Ulsan	Dongchun Gymnasium	5,831	1986	1997
Wonju DB Promy	Wonju	Chiak Gymnasium	3,100	1996	1997

== Regular season ==
Pos	Team	Pld	W	L	Pts	Qualification
1	Seoul SK Knights	54	44	10	0.815	Qualification to Semi-Finals
2	Ulsan Hyundai Mobis Phoebus	54	41	13	0.759	Qualification to Semi-Finals
3	Incheon Electroland Elephants	54	33	21	0.611	Qualification to Quarter-Finals
4	Anyang KGC	54	30	24	0.556	Qualification to Quarter-Finals
5	Goyang Orion Orions	54	27	27	0.500	Qualification to Quarter-Finals
6	Seoul Samsung Thunders	54	22	32	0.407	Qualification to Quarter-Finals
7	Wonju DB Promy	54	20	34	0.370	
8	Changwon LG Sakers	54	20	34	0.370	
9	Busan KT Sonicboom	54	20	34	0.370	
10	Jeonju KCC Egis	54	13	41	0.241	

== Playoffs ==
Quarter-finals
4 Anyang KGC	3
5 Goyang Orion Orions	2
3 Incheon Electroland Elephants	3
6 Seoul Samsung Thunders	0

Semi-finals
1 Seoul SK Knights	3
4 Anyang KGC	1
2 Ulsan Hyundai Mobis Phoebus	3
3 Incheon Electroland Elephants	0

Final
1 Seoul SK Knights	0
2 Ulsan Hyundai Mobis Phoebus	4
