= Anyang Gymnasium =

Arena in South Korea

Coordinates: 37°24′18.8″N 126°56′54.8″E

- 安養體育館
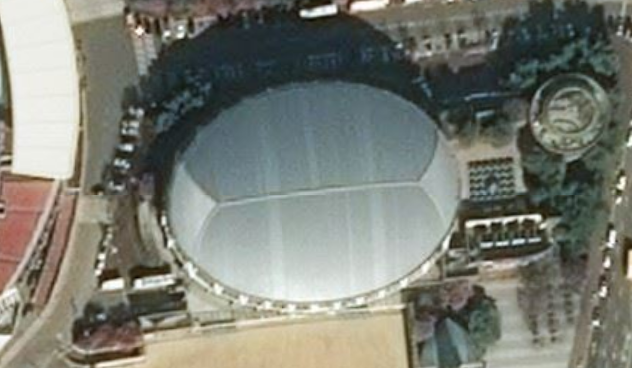
- Interactive map of Anyang Gymnasium
- Full name: Anyang Gymnasium
- Location: Anyang, South Korea
- Owner: City of Anyang
- Operator: Anyang City Facilities Management Corporation
- Capacity: 6,690

Construction
- Opened: November 4, 2000

Tenant
- Anyang Jung Kwan Jang Red Boosters

Anyang Gymnasium is an indoor arena in Anyang, South Korea. It is the home arena of the Anyang Jung Kwan Jang Red Boosters of the Korean Basketball League.
