= Joon Park =

South Korean and American entertainer (born 1969)

- 박준형
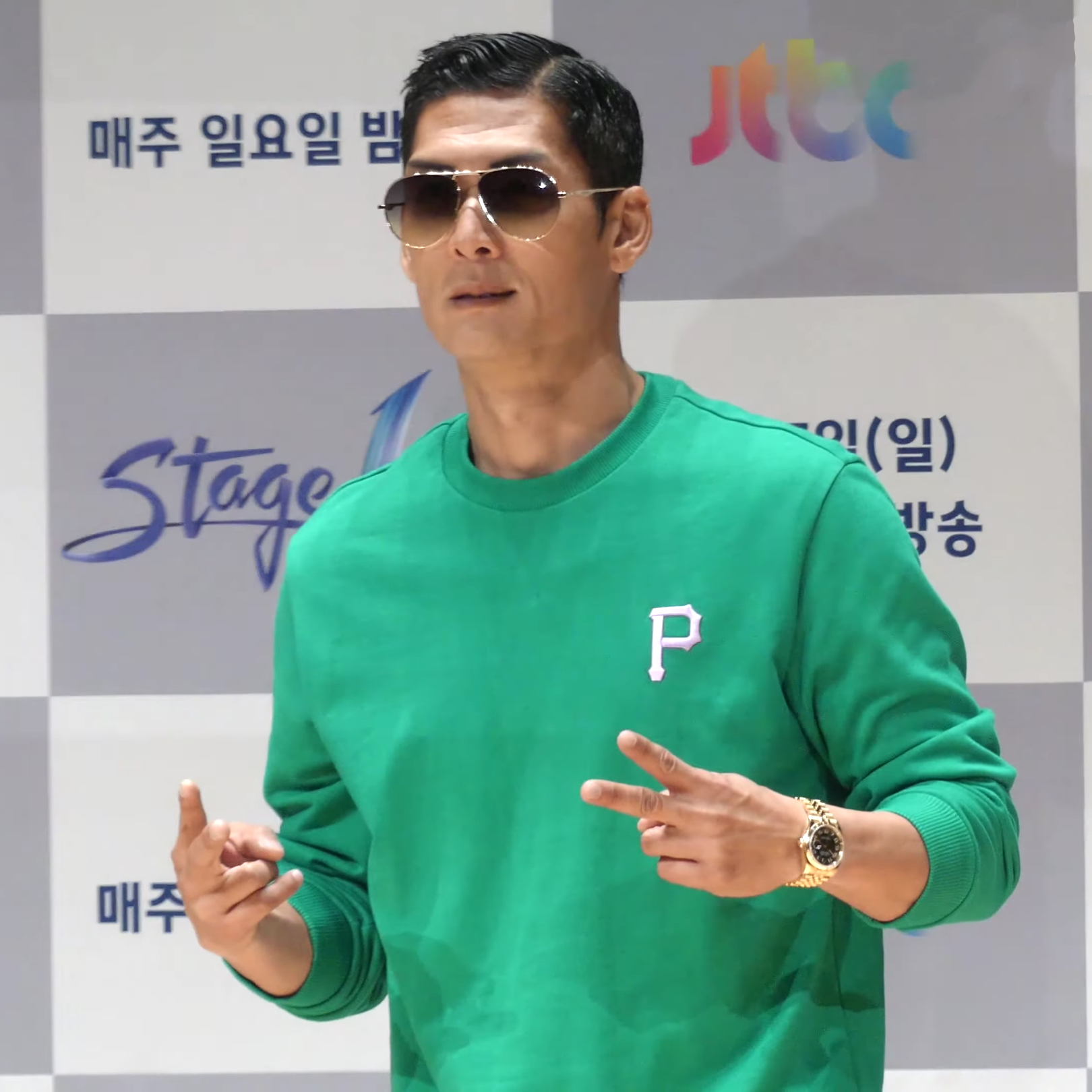
- Park for JTBC Stage K in 2019
- Born: Park Joon-hyung; July 20, 1969 (age 57); Seoul, South Korea
- Citizenship: South Korea; United States
- Education: California State University, Long Beach
- Occupations: Actor; singer; rapper
- Years active: 1999–present
- Spouse: Kim Yoo-Jin (m. 2015)
- Children: 1
- Relatives: Danny Ahn (cousin)
- Musical career
- Genres: K-pop, R&B
- Years active: 1999–present
- Labels: JYP; SidusHQ
- Member of: g.o.d
- Other name: Wassup Man (와썹맨)

YouTube information
- Channel: wassupman
- Genre: Variety
- Subscribers: 2.2 million
- Views: 222 million
- Last updated: May 16, 2020

Korean name
- Hangul: 박준형
- Hanja: 朴俊炯
- RR: Bak Junhyeong
- MR: Pak Chunhyŏng

Park Joon-hyung (Korean: 박준형; born July 20, 1969), known professionally as Joon Park, is a South Korean-born American singer, rapper, actor and entertainer. As a singer, he is best known as the leader and rapper of the Korean pop group g.o.d.

== Early life ==
Park was born in Seongbuk-dong, Seongbuk-gu, Seoul, South Korea, the youngest of three siblings, and raised in the United States, later becoming an American citizen. His father died when he was young, leaving him and his older siblings to be raised by their single mother. He graduated from La Quinta High School in Westminster, California, in 1987 and attended California State University, Long Beach. Prior to entering the entertainment industry, he worked at an advertising firm as a graphic designer.

== Career ==
=== Early years and forming g.o.d ===
In 1997 Park moved to Seoul, South Korea, where his older sister had been working, with the dream of creating a pop music group. He wanted to mix Korean music with a twist of western culture. The first member he recruited was his cousin Danny Ahn, followed by Danny's friend Son Ho-young, aspiring singer Yoon Kye-sang and rookie actress Kim Sun-a. However, their agency was forced to cut funding for trainees due to the 1997 Asian financial crisis and only relented due to Park and the other members' persistence. Singer-songwriter Park Jin-young was introduced to be their producer and the group was initially a six-piece mixed-gender group tentatively named "GOT6".

In the midst of preparations for the group's debut and album, Park was cast in a beer commercial for Oriental Brewery and also landed a small recurring role in the SBS sitcom Soonpoong Clinic (ko) as the boyfriend of Song Hye-kyo's character. Park later stated that all his earnings from the commercial and sitcom was spent on daily living expenses during the period he and the other members did not receive financial funding from their agency for over a year.

Kim Sun-a left to pursue acting. The final member, high school student Kim Tae-woo, joined the group in July 1998 after sending in an audition tape and impressing Park Jin-young during their meeting. The now five-member band then became g.o.d, short for Groove Over Dose.

=== 1999–2005: g.o.d ===
g.o.d debuted on television in January 1999 but their performance of "To Mother" (어머님께) was met with a lukewarm response from critics as the song's subject matter was highly unusual for that of an idol group, whom were usually pitched as teen idols. Nevertheless, the song would go on to be one of g.o.d's most famous hits. It was partly based on Joon's childhood being raised by a widowed single mother. The group also gained attention due to the large age gap between Park and Kim (12 years) and Park being much older than most of their contemporaries, who were either in their late teens or early twenties.

The group nearly broke up in 2001 after Park was discovered to be dating, which was considered to be taboo for most pop stars in South Korea at that time. Their management announced, without informing Park or the other group members, that Park was to leave the group and g.o.d would continue as a quartet. It was met with strong objection from fans, who signed petitions against the decision and threatened to boycott concerts. Ahn, Yoon, Son and Kim held their own press conference to show their support for Park and their management eventually backed down.

=== 2006–2014: Hiatus and acting ===
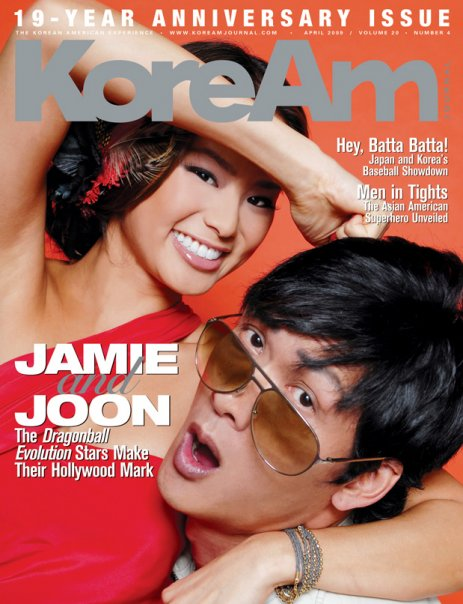
Park with Jamie Chung (left) on the cover of KoreAm

With Yoon having left the group in 2004, they decided to take a break in 2006 as the lead vocalist of the group Kim Tae-woo was required to perform his compulsory military duty. The other four members began their solo careers in the entertainment industry while Park returned to the United States. He moved back to the Los Angeles area to pursue acting, having a cameo on Speed Racer as the Platinum blond-haired Yakuza Driver and the role of Yamcha in the live-action film version of Dragonball Evolution in which he starred with Chow Yun Fat, Justin Chatwin, Emmy Rossum and Jamie Chung. He injured his back while filming Dragonball Evolution and was forced to rehabilitate for over two years.

=== 2014–present: Return to Korea ===
Park returned to Korea as the members of g.o.d had agreed to reunite for their 15th anniversary in 2014. He re-signed with SidusHQ, which also manages g.o.d. Since g.o.d's reunion, he has been utilizing his graphic design background in contributing to the production of their concerts, providing artwork for background visual effects and designing concert posters.

Park made a cameo as himself on MBC drama You Are My Destiny, which starred his long-time friend Jang Hyuk. In their scene, Jang's character enters rapping the opening verse of g.o.d's debut song "To Mother" in an exaggerated manner, a tongue-in-cheek reference to him starring in the song's music video. He and fellow K-pop stars Sunny from Girls' Generation and Jackson Wang from Got7 joined the cast for the second season of Roommate, a reality television series in which various celebrities share a house and are responsible for all household chores and meals. The show was not renewed for a third season due to low ratings despite the new additions being well-received.

Since returning to Korea, Park has largely been cast in various variety and reality shows such as Infinite Challenge, Saturday Night Live Korea, Radio Star, Life Bar and others, having gained popularity with audiences due to his cheerful persona and candidness. He also appeared in the music videos for "Shake That Brass", the title track of singer-rapper Amber Liu's debut EP Beautiful, and "Hot Sugar" (뜨거운 설탕), the comeback single of Kim Jong-kook's group Turbo.

In July 2018, Park opened a YouTube channel called Wassup Man featuring himself video blogging his travels in Korea. The videos began going viral on social media in South Korea and the channel had nearly 900,000 subscribers within two months. Based on data compiled by YouTube of the most viewed and popular videos in South Korea, Wassup Man drew the most South Korea-based subscribers within the shortest period of time during 2018. In 2020, Wassup Man was adapted as a Netflix series titled Wassup Man GO featuring Park in Los Angeles.

Park made a return to YouTube in 2024 by co-hosting the talk show BYOB with fellow Korean American entertainer and Fly to the Sky member Brian Joo. Due to its content centering around food, the videos were uploaded on the YouTube channel "JohnMaat" (존맛), a Korean food-focused YouTube channel notable for frequently featuring English-speaking entertainers and chefs based in South Korea. The casual format, diverse line-up of guests and Park and Joo's frequent interchanging of Korean and English made their talk show popular among both domestic and international fans.

In October 2025, Park and Jang began starring in their own reality show Park Jang Bros: Call Us Anytime, which airs on the cable channel Channel S Plus and features the duo attempting to fulfill various requests sent in from members of the public. The Korean title 박장대소 (park jang dae seo) is an idiom meaning "burst into laughter" and is a wordplay on their respective surnames (Park and Jang).

== Personal life ==
On May 4, 2015, Park's agency announced that he was engaged to Kim Yoo-Jin, a flight attendant whom he had been dating for about a year. They married on June 26, 2015. Their daughter was born on May 10, 2017.

== Filmography ==
=== Films ===
Year	Movie	Role
2008	Speed Racer	Yakuza Driver (Kakkoi Teppodama)
2009	Dragonball Evolution	Yamcha

=== Drama ===
Year	Title	Role	Notes
1998	Soonpoong Clinic	Joon	
2009	Dark Blue	Shin	Uncredited
2014	You Are My Destiny	Himself	Cameo
2014	Love Cells	Doraejoon (One man salesman)	Cameo

=== Television shows ===
Year	Title	Notes/Ref.
2014	Roommate	Regular cast; season 2
2015	Animals	
2016	The Friends in Chiang Mai	With Danny Ahn and Ryohei Otani
2016	Take a Look At Myself	With Jackson Wang
2016	I Can See Your Voice	Seasons 3-5
2019	TMI News	Cast member
2019	Stage K	Cast member
2019	Five Cranky Brothers	Cast member
2019–present	Super Hearer	Villain
2021	Are You Hungry for Delivery? Just Order It!	Cast member
2021	Falling for Korea - Transnational Couples	Judge
2021	Who Am I	Channel S / Host
2022	Rossily in Secret	Cast Member
2022	Anti-Ageym	Cast Member
2022	Other World Used Cars-Gear GODs	Host
2023	Live Well, Fun Equipment	Host
2024–2025	XYOB/BYOB	Co-host with Brian Joo
2025	Park Jang Bros: Call Us Anytime	Co-host with Jang Hyuk

== Discography ==
As a featured artist

Title	Year	Album	Ref.
"Gotta Clue" (Coco Lee feat. Joon Park)	2005	Exposed	
"Memory and Remembrance" (기억과 추억) (Kim Tae-woo feat. Joon-hyung, Ho-young and Danny)	2009	T-Virus	
"1990s" (Park Joon-hyung, Lee Ji-hye, Jang Su-won and Hyerin)	2016	digital release for Event King (이달의 행사왕)	
터널 (Paul Kim feat. Park Joon-hyung)	2018	정규 1집 Part 2	
