= Goyang Sono Skygunners =

South Korean men's basketball team

- League: Korean Basketball League
- Established: 1996; 30 years ago
- History: Dongyang Confectionary Basketball Team; 1996–1997; Daegu Tongyang Orions; 1997–2003; Daegu Orions; 2003–2011; Goyang Orions; 2011–2015; Goyang Orion Orions; 2015–2022; Goyang Carrot Jumpers; 2022–2023; Goyang Day One Jumpers; 2023; Goyang Sono Skygunners; 2023–present
- Arena: Goyang Gymnasium
- Capacity: 6,216
- Location: Goyang, Gyeonggi Province
- Team colours: Baby blue, navy blue, white
- Company: Daemyung Sono Group
- Head coach: Son Chang-hwan
- Championships: 2 Korean Leagues
- Website: skygunners.kbl.or.kr

Goyang Sono Skygunners (Korean: 고양 소노 스카이거너스) is a professional basketball club based in Goyang, South Korea which plays in the Korean Basketball League.

== History ==
=== Dayone Sports era (2022–2023) ===
Rumours of Orion selling its stake in the club intensified in early 2022. In April 2022, Orion confirmed that active negotiations with a potential buyer, Dayone Asset Management, a subsidiary of Daewoo Shipbuilding & Marine Engineering, was ongoing. The takeover was officially confirmed in May 2022, with the transfer of the entire club, players and staff to Dayone Asset Management. Kim Seung-gi, who won two championships with Anyang KGC, was appointed as the head coach of the team. On 24 June 2022, KBL officially approved the application of Dayone Sports as a member of the league, with a former player and coach, Hur Jae, being registered as the owner and manager of the club.

On 25 August 2022, Dayone Sports officially revealed that the club would be named Goyang Carrot Jumpers. In March 2023, due to financial problems, the team parted ways with sponsor Carrot Insurance and renamed themselves Goyang Day One Jumpers.

== Team names ==
- 1996–1997: Dongyang Confectionary Basketball Team
- 1997–2003: Daegu Tongyang Orions
- 2003–2011: Daegu Orions
- 2011–2015: Goyang Orions
- 2015–2022: Goyang Orion Orions
- 2022–2023: Goyang Carrot Jumpers
- 2023: Goyang Day One Jumpers
- 2023–present: Goyang Sono Skygunners

== Season by season ==
| Year | Regular season | | | Playoffs |
| Year | Position | Won | Lost | Playoffs |
|---|---|---|---|---|
| 1997 | 4th | 11 | 10 | Semifinals |
| 1997–98 | 5th | 23 | 22 | Semifinals |
| 1998–99 | 10th | 3 | 42 | Did not qualify |
| 1999–00 | 8th | 20 | 25 | Did not qualify |
| 2000–01 | 10th | 9 | 36 | Did not qualify |
| 2001–02 | 1st | 36 | 18 | Champions |
| 2002–03 | 1st | 38 | 16 | Runners-up |
| 2003–04 | 3rd | 32 | 22 | First round |
| 2004–05 | 6th | 26 | 28 | First round |
| 2005–06 | 6th | 28 | 26 | Semifinals |
| 2006–07 | 4th | 31 | 23 | Semifinals |
| 2007–08 | 10th | 12 | 42 | Did not qualify |
| 2008–09 | 9th | 18 | 36 | Did not qualify |
| 2009–10 | 10th | 15 | 39 | Did not qualify |
| 2010–11 | 10th | 15 | 39 | Did not qualify |
| 2011–12 | 8th | 20 | 34 | Did not qualify |
| 2012–13 | 5th | 27 | 27 | First round |
| 2013–14 | 6th | 27 | 27 | First round |
| 2014–15 | 5th | 31 | 23 | First round |
| 2015–16 | 3rd | 32 | 22 | Champions |
| 2016–17 | 2nd | 36 | 18 | Semifinals |
| 2017–18 | 8th | 19 | 35 | Did not qualify |
| 2018–19 | 5th | 27 | 27 | First round |
| 2019–20 (Note: The 2019–20 season was cut short due to the COVID-19 pandemic in South Korea.) | 10th | 13 | 30 | Not held |
| 2020–21 | 4th | 28 | 26 | First round |
| 2021–22 | 5th | 27 | 27 | Semifinals |
| 2022–23 | 5th | 28 | 26 | Semifinals |
| 2023–24 | 8th | 20 | 34 | Did not qualify |
| 2024–25 | 8th | 19 | 35 | Did not qualify |
| 2025–26 | 5th | 28 | 26 | Runners-up |

== Honours ==
- Korean Basketball League championship

Winners (2): 2001–02, 2015–16
Runners-up (2): 2002–03, 2025–26

- Korean Basketball League regular season

Winners (2): 2001–02, 2002–03
Runners-up (1): 2016–17

- KBL Pro-Am

Winners (1): 2015

- KBL Cup

Winners (1): 2020
