= BYOB (web series) =

- Also known as: XYOB
- Genre: Variety; talk; cooking
- Created by: JohnMaat
- Presented by: Brian Joo; Joon Park
- Country of origin: South Korea
- Original languages: English; Korean
- No. of seasons: 3
- No. of episodes: 61

Production
- Production companies: Round Studio; Samyang Roundsquare

Original release
- Network: YouTube
- Release: 22 March 2024 – 12 September 2025

BYOB, formerly titled as XYOB, is a South Korean variety show hosted by American singers and entertainers Brian Joo and Joon Park. Created and producted by Round Studio and Samyang Roundsquare, it is hosted on Samyang's YouTube channel JohnMaat and is billed as a global food talk show that interviews Korean idols in both English and Korean.

== History and format ==
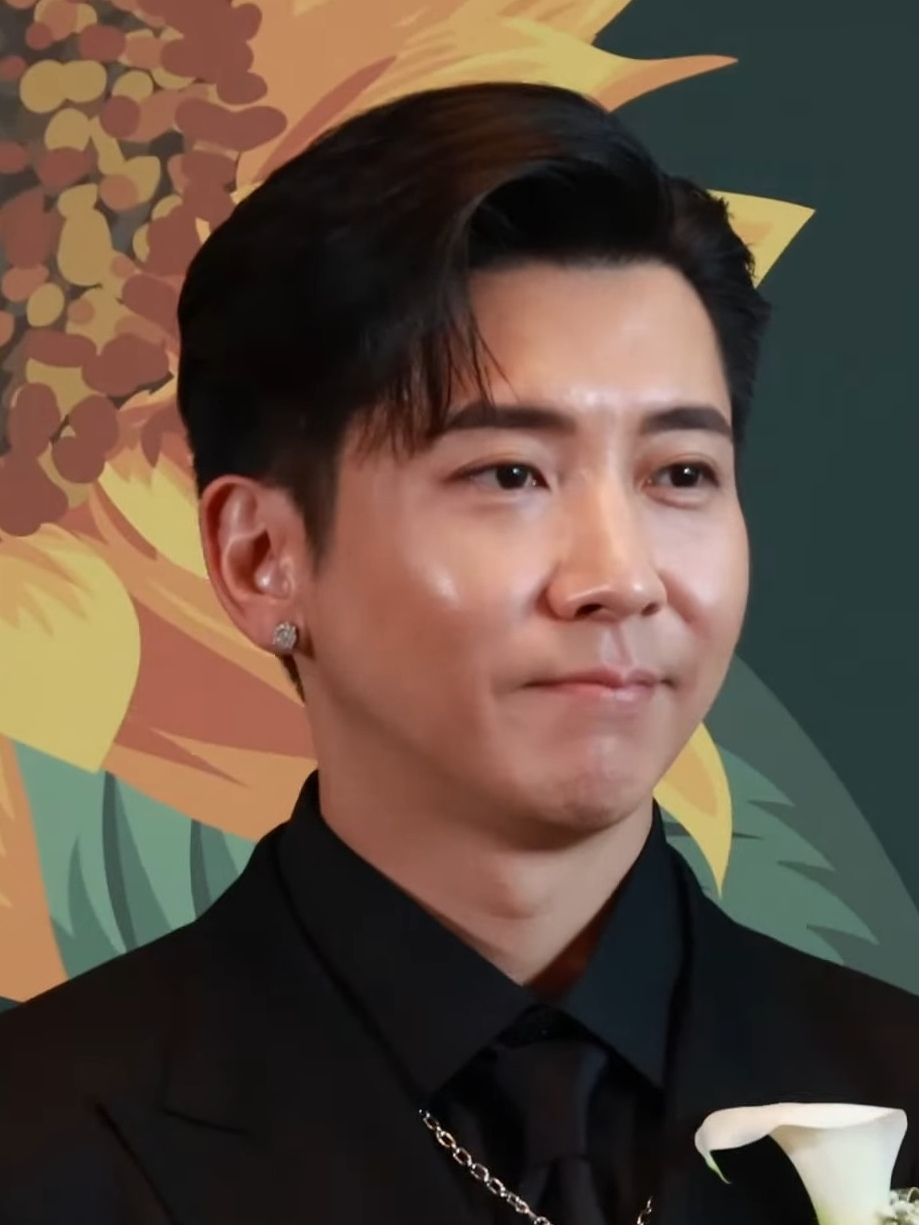
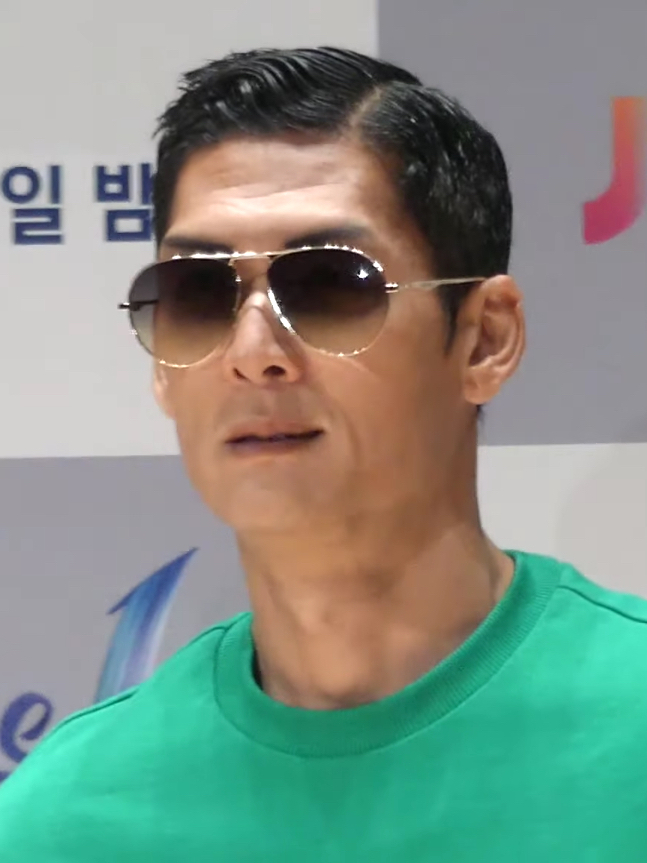
Brian Joo (left) and Joon Park (right) host the show.

BYOB is a variety and talk show in both English and Korean. Singers Brian Joo and Joon Park hosting the show; both Joo and Park had prior hosting experience on YouTube, with Joo hosting Cleaning Freak Brian in 2023, and Park creating Wassup Man on his channel in 2018. The title is a play on the phrase "bring your own booze"; in the first season the "X" in the title stood in for whatever guests had brought to the show.

=== Pairing Show (season 1) ===
The first season, titled XYOB Pairing Show, was presented as a global food talk show featuring interviews with Korean idols conducted in both English and Korean. Guests bring their own beverages to the show, which the hosts also drink during the episode, while chefs prepare various dishes paired with the beverages according to the guests' preferences.

The season's first guest was singer Chung Ha. Other guests included I.M, MJ, Yuqi, Rei, and Kwaktube, as well as Sam Hammington, Chon Tae-poong, DinDin, Sandara Park, Jay Park, Julien Kang, Austin Kang, Jenny Park, Patricia Yiombi, John Park, and Moonbyul. Members of Viviz, SF9, P1Harmony, Kiss of Life, Ateez, Epik High, STAYC, tripleS, and Kara also appeared as guests. The first season also featured guest‑tailored episodes: after the 13th episode, hip‑hop trio Epik High performed songs outdoors alongside hosts Joo and Park; in the 16th episode, which featured girl group tripleS, the program was filmed in a school gym to accommodate all 24 members, the largest cast to appear in a single episode.

=== Pocha (season 2) ===
In October 2024, JohnMaat posted a promotional poster on Instagram teasing a second season of the show, retitled BYOB. The announcement outlined a new format set at an outdoor pojangmacha with views of N Seoul Tower and featuring spicy food challenges. The season, subtitled Pocha, continues the global food talk format featuring K‑pop idols, now based around an outside pojangmacha concept in which hosts Brian Joo and Joon Park act as the owners who invite guests to share stories as chefs cook street food dishes ordered for them to eat. The season adds a spicy food segment to each episode, in which hosts and guests participate in a challenge involving spicy dishes. The production team published the recipes for the dishes prepared on the show for viewers to access. Unlike the previous season, the program was produced exclusively in English, with hosts and chefs speaking English to communicate with guests and to better retain global audiences.

The season's first guest is singer and actress Tiffany Young. Other guests included Ailee, J.Y. Park, BamBam, Young K, Kim Yoon-ji, and Roy Kim, as well as members of The Boyz, The Rose, WayV, Kard, and Enhypen. Sam Hammington, Chon Tae‑poong, and Austin Kang also returned for a reappearance. During the season, guests performed live renditions of songs they released and danced in short performances.

=== Random Cooking Challenge Show (season 3) ===
The third season, titled the Random Cooking Challenge Show, changes the format so that hosts and guests complete challenges to earn chances to select random ingredients, then cook dishes using only those chosen ingredients. Guests bring an ingredient for the specific dish; the group adapts the dish based on the available ingredients, and the guests name the resulting creation. The season's first guests were members of BoyNextDoor. Other guests included Joshua, Lia, An Yu-jin, and Yuqi, as well as members of N.Flying, Infinite, Ateez, Fifty Fifty, NCT Dream, Tempest, Treasure, and Astro. Kard and Kiss of Life returned as guests; KARD member BM served as a co‑host in place of Joon Park, and Mimi of Oh My Girl also appeared as a guest host.

== Reception ==
The show's casual format, bilingual use of Korean and English, and diverse guest lineup made BYOB popular with both domestic and international audiences. By May 2024, the show had accumulated nearly four million total views. By July of that same year, that figure had risen to about ten million total views, with An Tae-hyeon of News1 reporting that the most‑viewed episode, featuring South Korea-based Australian comedian Sam Hammington and Korean-American basketball player Chon Tae-poong, had garnered 1.8 million views. Kyunghyang Shinmun noted that casual format was more akin to an American talk show and the use of Korean food as a central theme made it appealing to both domestic and international viewers. The Chosun Ilbo praised the chemistry between hosts Brian Joo and Joon Park, noting their humorous dynamics and status as industry veterans allowed them to interact with their guests and freely discuss their shared experiences in the music industry.

== Episodes ==
=== Season 1 (2024) ===
No.	Title	Guest(s)	Original release date	Running time
0	"What da h*ll?! Joon & Brian finally meet to host a talk show.. 👬" (Korean: 와썹맨 박준형 vs 청소광 브라이언 레전드 교포 2MC가 만났습니다)	—	22 March 2024	6:59
0–2	"Joon & Brian interview each other and it's a mess... 📣" (Korean: 박준형 & 브라이언 이제 글로벌로 갑니다 ✈️)	—	28 March 2024	4:04
1	"Chungha eats everything, no need for EENIE MEENIE 🍽️" (Korean: 청하 들고 찾아온 첫 월클 게스트 원소주)	Chung Ha	29 March 2024	20:15
2	"Joon & Brian become MANIAC in front of VIVIZ 🕺" (Korean: 비비지 만나서 매니악 옹동이 춤추기🕺)	Viviz	5 April 2024	20:53
3	"SF9 Inseong & Dawon Show Off Their Bromance Richer Than Caviar! ✨" (Korean: 캐비어 값 퉁치는 SF9 인성 & 다원 사랑 싸움 직관)	Inseong and Dawon of SF9	12 April 2024	19:58
4	"Monsta X I.M & Astro MJ lure us with their opposite personalities ☯" (Korean: 내향인 몬스타엑스 아이엠 vs 외향인 아스트로 MJ)	I.M and MJ	19 April 2024	19:58
5	"P1Harmony is Killin’ It with more than just music 🗣️🕺🤳" (Korean: 때깔 좋은 피원하모니 스튜디오를 완전 Killin' it)	Intak, Jiung, and Keeho of P1Harmony	26 April 2024	19:30
6	"YUQI of (G)I-DLE gets "FREAK"y with Joon & Brian 🤪" (Korean: 살다살다 이런 배틀까지...? (여자)아이들 우기 vs 쭌앤브라 한국어 대결)	Yuqi	3 May 2024	16:41
7	""HEYA wanna curse?" IVE REI gets a thrill from Joon & Brian's cursing 🫣🤣" (Korean: 콩순이의 습격.. 해야(HEYA)로 돌아온 아이브(IVE) 레이)	Rei	10 May 2024	19:52
8	"KISS OF LIFE brings the Midas Touch to XYOB ✨" (Korean: 키스오브라이프 너네 맞다이로 드루와🔥 브라이언 vs 나띠 궁뒝이방뒝이 댄스 배틀)	Kiss of Life	17 May 2024	19:01
9	"MrBeast follows him and ladies are sliding into his DMs – KWAKTUBE is here! 😏" (Korean: 곽튜브 월클 유튜버와 토크 여행🌎 글로벌 치트키 썼습니다)	Kwaktube	24 May 2024	20:29
10	"Foreigners Unite! Sam Hammington & Chon Taepoong: Who is more Korean? 🇰🇷" (Korean: ※역대급 재미※ 전태풍 & 샘해밍턴 한국인 패치가 되어버린 외국 꼰대 듀오)	Sam Hammington and Chon Tae-poong	31 May 2024	20:39
11	"ATEEZ WORK really hard to prove their strength 💪" (Korean: 코첼라를 씹어먹은 해적들의 습격 🏴‍☠️ 에이티즈(ATEEZ)에 빠져보쉴?)	Mingi, San, and Yeosang of Ateez	7 June 2024	20:29
12	"DinDin tries to hide a girl & Sandara Park talks first kiss 💋" (Korean: 딘딘 & 산다라박 💏 유학파 연예인이 싹 다 푸는 할리우드스러운(?) 연애썰)	DinDin and Sandara Park	14 June 2024	18:43
13	"YG Epik High, JYP Joon, and SM Brian spill the tea on the old days! 👀" (Korean: ※분량 주의※ 그만 좀 싸워!!! 😡 에픽하이 끝없는 라떼 시절 추억팔이 폭로전(?))	Epik High	21 June 2024	23:49
14	"Tanghulu ambassador STAYC introduce Brian & Joon to the Tanghulu challenge 🍡" (Korean: 아이돌 大선배 맘에 탕후루♪ 챌린지 끝판왕 STAYC(스테이씨) 재이 & 시은 & 윤)	J, Sieun, and Yoon of STAYC	28 June 2024	17:19
15	"Jay Park gets McNasty showing off his MOMMAE with Brian & Chon Taepoong 🔥" (Korean: "키스 마크 누구 꺼야?" 몸매 때 보다 수위 높아진 박재범 (JayPark) (feat. 전태풍))	Chon Tae-Poong (guest host) and Jay Park	5 July 2024	20:06
16	"24 members?! 😮 All of tripleS show off their moves in a dance battle 💃" (Korean: 역대급 스케일※ 멤버 수가 24명..? 예능돌 신흥강자 tripleS(트리플에스)에 습격 당함)	TripleS	12 July 2024	23:27
17	"Julien Kang got drunk in his underwear & Austin Kang takes a buldak shot! 🔥" (Korean: 교포 또 모았습니다 😍피지컬과 존잘을 곁들인.. 줄리엔강 & 오스틴강)	Julien Kang and Austin Kang	19 July 2024	20:17
18	"KARA YoungJi & JiYoung show these MISTERs how to shake their booty 🍑" (Korean: 카라(KARA) 강지영 & 허영지 💃원조 궁뒝이방뒝이 댄스보여주러 옴)	Chon Tae-poong (guest host), Youngji and Jiyoung of Kara	26 July 2024	21:37
19	"Who can’t speak English: Jenny Park, Patricia, Brian, or Sam Hammington? 😏" (Korean: “혹시 영어 프로그램인가요?” 갑작스런 영어 토크에 당황한 파트리샤&박제니ㅋㅋ)	Sam Hammington (guest host), Jenny Park, and Patricia Yiombi	2 August 2024	19:47
20	"John Park & MoonByul of MAMAMOO test their ramen & naengmyeon expertise! 🍜" (Korean: ※여름특집※ 면이라면 눈 감고도 맞추는 냉면꼰대 존박 & 라면꼰대 문별)	Sam Hammington (guest host), John Mark, and Moonbyul	9 August 2024	20:13
21	"Best of XYOB: Chon Taepoong, Sam Hammington, Epik High, and Jay Park! 🤣" (Korean: ※역대급 재미 보장※ 교포특집 100만회 돌파! 미방분 모음.zip)	—	16 August 2024	19:45
22	"Here’s a XYOB BTS you didn’t ask for 😏 KISS OF LIFE, ATEEZ, and more!" (Korean: 이것까지 공개한다고? XYOB의 숨겨놨던 미방분 大방출📁)	—	23 August 2024	13:59
22	"Bored? Here’s your 2 hour playlist of K-foreigners talking😎" (Korean: 🍚밥 먹을 때 보면 시간 순삭되는 친한 교포들 토크 2시간 몰아보기)	—	23 August 2024	1:59:45
23	"A Girl group playlist? Yes please" (Korean: 내가 보려고 만든 여돌 모음.zip 💛 2시간 시간 순삭)	—	6 September 2024	2:14:09
24	"Boy groups, assemble! All in this playlist😘" (Korean: 시간 순삭 되는 얼굴 천재💫 남자 아이돌 레전드 특집)	—	13 September 2024	1:55:49

=== Season 2 (2024–2025) ===
No.	Title	Guest(s)	Original release date	Running time
0	"BYOB is back! Welcome to Joon& Brian’s Pojangmacha!"	—	3 October 2024	3:37
1	"SNSD Tiffany is here! From K-pop to Chicago’s Sexy Roxie💖"	Tiffany Young	4 October 2024	26:52
2	"Ailee’s got a “I Will Show You” love reveal!💕 Who's ready? 👀"	Ailee	10 October 2024	24:33
3	"TheRose is Finally on Variety! Catch Their Killer Voice on YouTube 💙"	The Rose	17 October 2024	31:19
4	"THEBOYZ shares their favorite K-food! They can't stop eating 🍲"	Kevin, Jacob, and Eric of The Boyz	24 October 2024	27:43
5	"KoreanFood show! 2M view guests show real K-BBQ & Soju mukbang!"	Sam Hammington and Chon Tae-poong	31 October 2024	24:24
6	"JYP is finally here!🔥 How much does K-pop mean to him?"	J.Y. Park	7 November 2024	35:12
7	"GOT7 BamBam and real Clean Freaks gather! What’s their biggest fear?"	BamBam	14 November 2024	TBA
8	"WayV Joins the SM vs JYP Hot Challenge🔥 Who's the Winner?"	Ten and Yangyang of WayV	21 November 2024	29:09
9	"DAY6 Young K here to melt your ears ❤️‍🔥"	Young K	28 November 2024	27:20
10	"2PM Nichkhun is here with Sexy Hollywood Drama Stories..🔥"	Nichkhun	5 December 2024	24:51
11	"Hollywood spotlight meets Yunjee’s new chapter💫"	Kim Yoon-ji	12 December 2024	28:35
12	"Xmas and Roy Kim? The Perfect Christmas Gift is Here! 🎁"	Roy Kim	19 December 2024	28:44
13	"KoreanFood meets Austin Kang & Meat Gangster for fun food talks!"	Austin Kang and David Lee	26 December 2024	28:54
14	"ENHYPEN JAKE Brings His UNTOLD Stories To BYOB 🫢"	Jake of Enhypen	9 January 2025	26:46
15	"KARD is Here with Their Hit Medley and TMI spills 🎶"	BM and Jiwoo of Kard	16 January 2025	28:36
16	"Hot challenge Lv.99 🥵 Only for the real challengers!"	—	23 January 2025	34:49
16	"The #BuldakRecipe even approved by K-pop artists!"	—	30 January 2025	48:24
17	"BYOB Live Compilation! The Voices that Melts Your Ears 🫠🫠🫠"	—	6 February 2025	32:32
18	"FUN ALERT: Hold Your Breath for Joon & Brian’s Wildest Moments 😂😂"	—	13 February 2025	38:58

=== Season 3 (2025) ===
No.	Title	Guest(s)	Original release date	Running time
0	"BYOB is BACK! Now bigger and wilder! 🔥🔥"	—	20 May 2025	8:32
1	"BOYNEXTDOOR is here for the BYOB challenge!“I FEEL GOOD!”🔥🔥"	Taesan, Leehan, and Woonhak of BoyNextDoor	22 May 2025	33:17
2	"SEVENTEEN JOSHUA is the cutest chef ever! ◠‿◠ (feat. Vernon in shower🚿)"	Joshua	29 May 2025	30:08
3	"N.Flying is the sweetest chef ever 🥹❤️"	Lee Seung-hyub and Yoo Hwe-seung of N.Flying	5 June 2025	35:31
4	"INFINITE broke the BYOB challenge record?! 😳"	Woohyun and Dongwoo of Infinite	12 June 2025	39:40
5	"ITZY LIA is the cutest challenge cheater ever 💖"	Lia	19 June 2025	33:25
6	"ATEEZ in the kitchen! A bit of Lemon Drop on the menu 🍋"	Seonghwa and Wooyoung of Ateez	26 June 2025	44:29
7	"FIFTYFIFTY is the pookie everyday 🥰"	Chanelle Moon, Athena, and Yewon of Fifty Fifty	3 July 2025	41:27
8	"NCT DREAM back on D'chelin Gourmet mood"	Mark, Renjun, and Chenle of NCT Dream	10 July 2025	46:16
9	"IVE YUJIN and MIMI ?! Best adorable duo in BYOB history❤️"	Mimi of Oh My Girl (guest host) and An Yu-jin	17 July 2025	44:11
10	"KARD serves up chaos, tacos, and too much chemistry 🌮💥"	Kard, with BM as guest host	24 July 2025	35:45
11	"K-pop idols Go From the Stage to BYOB Kitchen ! All the Best Dance Clips 🕺"	—	31 July 2025	10:39
12	"Cooking Fails, Cabinet Nightmares 💥 BYOB Special Compilation"	—	7 August 2025	TBA
13	"TEMPEST vs the legendary fish ingredient! 🐟 Can they win the challenge?"	BM (guest host), Lew, Hanbin, and Hyeongseop of Tempest	14 August 2025	31:50
14	"KISS OF LIFE cooking the HOTTEST buldak pizza 🍕🔥"	Kiss of Life	21 August 2025	35:48
15	"TREASURE makes Kimchi Fried Rice! with Zero Cooking Skills"	So Jung-hwan, Junkyu, and Park Jeong-woo of Treasure	28 August 2025	43:36
16	"ASTRO ZOONIZINI tries cooking for the FIRST TIME 😨"	MJ and Jinjin of Astro	4 September 2025	34:53
17	"i-dle YUQI is back with full BYOB energy!"	Yuqi	11 September 2025	39:47
