= 2010–11 KBL season =

- League: Korean Basketball League
- Sport: Basketball
- Duration: October 15, 2010 – April 26, 2011
- TV partner(s): KBS, MBC, MBC Sports+, SBS Sports, OBS, SPOTV

Regular Season
- Season champions: Busan KT Sonicboom
- Season MVP: (South Korea) Park Sang-oh (KT)
- Top scorer: (United States) Aaron Haynes (Samsung)

Finals
- Champions: Jeonju KCC Egis
- Runners-up: Wonju Dongbu Promy
- Finals MVP: (South Korea) Ha Seung-jin (KCC)

KBL seasons
- ← 2009–10 2011–12 →

The 2010–11 Hyundai Mobis Professional Basketball season was the 15th season of the Korean Basketball League.

== Regular season ==
RK	Team	G	W	L	PCT	GB	Tiebreaker
1	Busan KT Sonicboom	54	41	13	0.759	–	–
2	Incheon ET Land Elephants	54	38	16	0.704	3	–
3	Jeonju KCC Egis	54	34	20	0.630	7	–
4	Wonju Dongbu Promy	54	31	23	0.574	10	–
5	Changwon LG Sakers	54	28	26	0.519	13	–
6	Seoul Samsung Thunders	54	27	27	0.500	14	–
7	Seoul SK Knights	54	20	34	0.370	21	5–1
8	Ulsan Mobis Phoebus	54	20	34	0.370	21	1–5
9	Anyang KGC	54	16	38	0.296	25	–
10	Daegu Orions	54	15	39	0.278	26	–

== Playoffs ==
1st Round
4	Dongbu	3
5	LG	0
3	KCC	3
6	Samsung	0

Semifinals
1	KT	1
4	Dongbu	3
2	ET Land	1
3	KCC	3

Finals
4	Dongbu	2
3	KCC	4

2010–2011 KBL Champions
Jeonju KCC Egis
5th title

== Prize money ==
- Jeonju KCC Egis: KRW 130,000,000 (champions + regular-season 3rd place)
- Busan KT Sonicboom: KRW 100,000,000 (regular-season 1st place)
- Wonju Dongbu Promy: KRW 50,000,000 (runners-up)
- Incheon ET Land Elephants: KRW 50,000,000 (regular-season 2nd place)
