= 2014–15 KBL season =

KBL League
- Season: 2014–15
- Dates: October 2014 – April 2015

The 2014–15 KBL season was the 19th season of the Korean Basketball League (KBL), the highest level of basketball in South Korea. Ulsan Hyundai Mobis Phoebus won its third title in a row, and sixth overall.

== Clubs ==
| Team | City | Arena | Capacity | Founded | Joined |
|---|---|---|---|---|---|
| Anyang KGC | Anyang | Anyang Gymnasium | 6,690 | 1992 | 1997 |
| Busan KT Sonicboom | Busan | Sajik Arena | 14,099 | 1997 | 1997 |
| Changwon LG Sakers | Changwon | Changwon Gymnasium | 6,000 | 1994 | 1997 |
| Goyang Orion Orions | Goyang | Goyang Gymnasium | 6,216 | 1995 | 1997 |
| Incheon Electroland Elephants | Incheon | Samsan World Gymnasium | 7,220 | 1994 | 1997 |
| Jeonju KCC Egis | Jeonju | Jeonju Gymnasium | 4,730 | 1977 | 1997 |
| Seoul Samsung Thunders | Seoul | Jamsil Arena | 11,069 | 1978 | 1997 |
| Seoul SK Knights | Seoul | Jamsil Students' Gymnasium | 6,229 | 1997 | 1997 |
| Ulsan Hyundai Mobis Phoebus | Ulsan | Dongchun Gymnasium | 5,831 | 1986 | 1997 |
| Wonju DB Promy | Wonju | Wonju Gymnasium | 4,600 | 1996 | 1997 |

== Regular season ==
| Pos | Team | Pld | W | L | Pts | Qualification |
|---|---|---|---|---|---|---|
| 1 | Ulsan Hyundai Mobis Phoebus | 54 | 39 | 15 | 0.722 | Qualification to Semi-Finals |
| 2 | Wonju DB Promy | 54 | 37 | 17 | 0.685 | Qualification to Semi-Finals |
| 3 | Seoul SK Knights | 54 | 37 | 17 | 0.685 | Qualification to Quarter-Finals |
| 4 | Changwon LG Sakers | 54 | 32 | 22 | 0.593 | Qualification to Quarter-Finals |
| 5 | Goyang Orion Orions | 54 | 31 | 23 | 0.574 | Qualification to Quarter-Finals |
| 6 | Incheon Electroland Elephants | 54 | 25 | 29 | 0.463 | Qualification to Quarter-Finals |
| 7 | Busan KT Sonicboom | 54 | 23 | 31 | 0.426 | |
| 8 | Anyang KGC | 54 | 23 | 31 | 0.426 | |
| 9 | Jeonju KCC Egis | 54 | 12 | 42 | 0.222 | |
| 10 | Seoul Samsung Thunders | 54 | 11 | 43 | 0.204 | |

== Playoffs ==
Quarter-finals
4 Changwon LG Sakers | 3
5 Goyang Orion Orions | 2
3 Seoul SK Knights | 0
6 Incheon Electroland Elephants | 3

Semi-finals
1 Ulsan Hyundai Mobis Phoebus | 3
4 Changwon LG Sakers | 2
2 Wonju DB Promy | 3
6 Incheon Electroland Elephants | 2

Final
1 Ulsan Hyundai Mobis Phoebus | 4
2 Wonju DB Promy | 0
