= Jeonju Gymnasium =

Arena in Jeonju, South Korea

Coordinates: 35°50′39″N 127°07′45.0″E

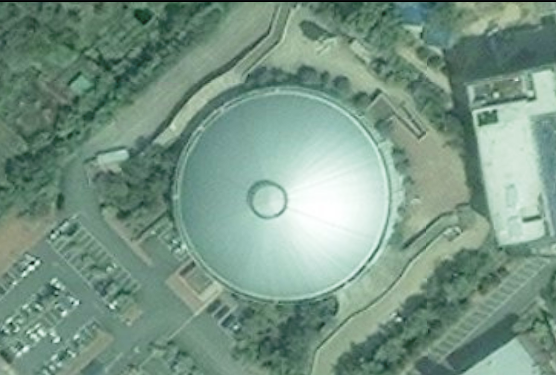
- Interactive map of Jeonju Gymnasium
- Full name: Jeonju Indoor Gymnasium
- Location: Jeonju, South Korea
- Owner: Jeonju
- Operator: Jeonju City Facilities Management Corporation
- Capacity: 4,730

Construction
- Opened: March 1973
- Cost

Tenant
- Jeonju KCC Egis

Korean name
- Hangul: 전주실내체육관
- Hanja: 全州室內體育館
- RR: Jeonju sillae cheyukgwan
- MR: Chŏnju sillae ch'eyukkwan

Jeonju Gymnasium is an arena in Jeonju, South Korea. It was the home arena of the Jeonju KCC Egis of the Korean Basketball League (KBL) prior to their move to Busan in 2023.

== History ==
Jeonju Gymnasium is located on land owned by the nearby Jeonbuk National University. The construction of Jeonju Gymnasium began on 10 November 1969, and lasted for three years and four months, with total costs amounting to ₩246,497,000. Its opening ceremony was held on 30 March 1973, and included a basketball match between long-time rivals Korea University and Yonsei University, both based in Seoul, in which Yonsei lost with a score of 58–66. Significant remodelling and modernisation work was carried out prior to the 2011–12 KBL season, at cost of roughly ₩400 million. Major upgrades included the installation of large high-definition television screens and improvements to the lighting systems. The arena floor has an area of 1,502 square metres (16,170 sq ft). The flooring material was originally beechwood, but it was replaced in 2013 with palmate maple.

During its existence, Jeonju Gymnasium was the only large-scale indoor sports arena in the city, though there were multiple proposals to build a second one. Despite the remodelling, public perceptions of safety issues in the gymnasium persisted. There were also capacity issues, with the team having to put up 300 extra chairs during the playoffs. These considerations led Egis owner KCC Corporation to consider a 2016 proposal to move the team to Suwon where they could enjoy the use of a newly-constructed stadium. Pledges by Jeonju mayor Kim Seung-su to build a new gymnasium or further remodel the existing one kept the team in Jeonju for the time being. However, Jeonbuk University announced plans to demolish the Jeonju Gymnasium to make way for the construction of a science park, leading to Egis' decision to move to Busan in 2023. Construction of a new stadium to replace Jeonju Gynmasium began in 2024 at a site in Yeoui-dong, Deokjin District.
