= Anyang Jung Kwan Jang Red Boosters =

- League: Korean Basketball League
- Established: 1992; 34 years ago
- History: SBS Basketball Team; 1992–1997; Anyang SBS Stars; 1997–2005; Anyang KT&G Kites; 2005–2010; Anyang Korea Ginseng Corporation; 2010–2011; Anyang KGC; 2011–2023; Anyang Jung Kwan Jang Red Boosters; 2023–present
- Arena: Anyang Gymnasium
- Capacity: 6,690
- Location: Anyang, South Korea
- Team colours: Red, black, white
- Head coach: Yoo Do-hoon
- Team captain: Park Ji-hoon
- Ownership: Heo Cheol-ho
- Affiliations: Korea Ginseng Corporation; KT&G
- Championships: 4 Korean Leagues
- Website: www.kgcsports.com
Home	Away

The Anyang Jung Kwan Jang Red Boosters (Korean: 안양 정관장 레드부스터스) is a professional basketball club in the Korean Basketball League, based at Anyang Gymnasium in the city of Anyang. The club has won four KBL championship titles (2011–12, 2016–17, 2020–21, and 2022–23).

== History ==
=== Pre-KBL era (1992–1997) ===
Anyang KGC traces its lineage to the amateur basketball team started by Seoul Broadcasting System (SBS) in 1992. It was one of several basketball teams started by corporate companies hoping to take advantage of the "basketball craze" taking place during the early to mid-1990s. Prior to 1997, domestic basketball was an amateur sport and all teams, whether sponsored by a corporate company or a university, participated in the National Basketball Festival (농구대잔치) competition. The SBS team lacked the financial resources to attract the era's biggest stars and was mostly overshadowed by the dominance of the Kia, Samsung Electronics and Hyundai Electronics and the college teams from Yonsei University and Korea University. One of the better-known players from this era was Jung Jae-kun.

=== Anyang SBS Stars (1997–2005) ===
When domestic basketball turned professional, SBS decided to register its team for the upcoming league. The Anyang SBS Stars would move to Anyang, where the team has been ever since. The Anyang municipal government agreed to invest in building a new sports complex to house the basketball team in addition to the football team (Anyang LG Cheetahs) and ice hockey team (Anyang Halla). However the project would take several years to complete so the Anyang SBS Stars had to play their "home" games elsewhere, even though it had "Anyang" in its name. The team spent its first several years playing at Jamsil Arena (now home to Seoul Samsung Thunders), Uijeongbu Gymnasium (repurposed for volleyball and now home to Uijeongbu KB Insurance Stars) and Daelim University College's gymnasium. Anyang Gymnasium was completed on schedule ahead of the 2000–01 season.

At the end of the 2004–05 season, SBS sold the team to Korea Tobacco & Ginseng Corporation (KT&G). At that time, it was the only basketball team sponsored by a broadcasting company. Taeyoung Group, the parent company of SBS, decided to consolidate its financial resources in the broadcasting sector, hence the sale.

=== KT&G / KGC era (2005–present) ===
Under their new sponsors, Anyang KT&G Kites spent the next several seasons in the middle ranks of the league table and changed names several times. Red, the color of KGC's best-known product Cheong Kwan Jang, was adopted as the team color and has been associated with Anyang KGC ever since. In 2010, KT&G opted to transfer ownership and naming rights of its sponsored sports teams to subsidiary Korea Ginseng Corporation (KGC) as company directors felt that the sports teams being associated with a tobacco company would be detrimental to marketing efforts. The team, although keeping the signature red color, went through a rebranding with a new team logo and mascot.

The 2011–12 season was a major milestone for the team as they won their first ever Championship. At that time, Anyang had a relatively young and inexperienced squad, consisting of center Oh Se-keun, forward Yang Hee-jong and guards Kim Tae-sul, Park Chan-hee and Lee Jung-hyun, while their own head coach Lee Sang-beom was only in his third season as a head coach of a KBL team. The team suffered the embarrassment of scoring only 41 points in the January game against eventual regular season champions Wonju Dongbu Promy and setting an all-time record for the lowest score in a league game. Despite the setbacks, Anyang managed to reach the final of the play-offs, where they were up against Dongbu. Pundits and observers had predicted the young squad was no match for a Dongbu team which earned the nickname "Dongbu Mountain Fortress" (동부산성) for recording the league's best defensive record. Anyang won four out of six games to lift the Championship trophy for the first time in its history. Oh, Yang, Kim, Park and Lee became collectively known as Insamshinki (인삼신기), a portmanteau of KGC's Korean name Insamgongsa (인삼공사) and Dong Bang Shin Ki (동방신기). The quintet went on to carve out their own decorated careers as the league's top domestic players and establish themselves as the backbone of the national team.

KGC spent the 2013–14 and 2014–15 seasons in the lower half of the league table, failing to qualify for the play-offs on both occasions. The 2011–12 team was soon broken up with the departure of Kim to Jeonju KCC Egis and Park, Lee and Oh each enlisting for mandatory military service one after another. They were dealt another blow when Lee Sang-beom's successor Jun Chang-jin was investigated for allegations of match-fixing during his time at Busan KT Sonicboom. Jun never had the chance to coach the team in a league game as he resigned before the 2015–16 season began. To add to the turmoil, Oh was also investigated in connection with the match-fixing case after it was discovered that he and several college teammates had placed bets with the illegal sports betting site back when they were students. Jun's assistant Kim Seung-gi took over and found himself having to fill the void left by Oh, who was suspended for 20 games, and other key players who were absent due to injury or enlistment.

== Team names ==
- 1992–1997: SBS Basketball Team
- 1997–2005: Anyang SBS Stars
- 2005–2010: Anyang KT&G Kites
- 2010–2011: Anyang Korea Ginseng Corporation
- 2011–2023: Anyang KGC
- 2023–present: Anyang Jung Kwan Jang Red Boosters

== Current roster ==
Note: Flags indicate national team eligibility at FIBA-sanctioned events. Players may hold other non-FIBA nationalities not displayed.

Anyang Jung Kwan Jang Red Boosters roster
Players
Coaches

Pos.	No.	Nat.	Name	Ht.	Wt.	Age
G	0	(South Korea)	Lee Woo-jung	1.83 m (6 ft 0 in)		30 – 16 June 1995
G	1	(South Korea)	Bae Byung-jun	1.88 m (6 ft 2 in)		35 – 9 August 1990
F	2	(South Korea)	Yoo Jin	1.94 m (6 ft 4 in)		27 – 2 February 1999
F	3	(South Korea)	Jeong Jun-won	1.93 m (6 ft 4 in)		37 – 5 January 1989
G	5	(South Korea)	Byeon Jun-hyeong	1.85 m (6 ft 1 in)		30 – 11 March 1996
G	6	(South Korea)	Park Ji-hoon	1.84 m (6 ft 0 in)		31 – 21 January 1995
F	7	(South Korea)	Ham Jun-hoo	1.95 m (6 ft 5 in)		37 – 16 June 1988
G	9	(South Korea)	Go Chan-hyuk	1.84 m (6 ft 0 in)		24 – 25 May 2001
F	10	(South Korea)	Moon Seong-gon	1.96 m (6 ft 5 in)		33 – 9 May 1993
F	11	(South Korea)	Yang Hee-jong (C)	1.94 m (6 ft 4 in)		42 – 11 May 1984
G	12	(Philippines)	Rhenz Abando (AQ)	1.88 m (6 ft 2 in)		28 – 11 March 1998
F	13	(South Korea)	Han Seung-hui	1.96 m (6 ft 5 in)		28 – 5 May 1998
C	14	(Lebanon)	Omari Spellman (I)	2.03 m (6 ft 8 in)		28 – 21 July 1997
F	15	(South Korea)	Ju Hyun-woo	1.97 m (6 ft 6 in)		27 – 6 September 1998
G	22	(South Korea)	Jo Eun-hoo	1.87 m (6 ft 2 in)		26 – 13 December 1999
C	32	(South Korea)	Kim Cheol-uk	2.02 m (6 ft 8 in)		33 – 25 June 1992
C	41	(South Korea)	Oh Se-keun	2.00 m (6 ft 7 in)		38 – 20 May 1987
F	86	(United States)	Darryl Monroe (I)	1.97 m (6 ft 6 in)		40 – 30 January 1986

Head coach

- (South Korea) Kim Sang-shik

Assistant coach(es)

- (South Korea) Choi Seung-tae
- (South Korea) Cho Sung-min

Legend

- (C) Team captain
- (I) Import player
- (AQ) Asian player quota
- Injured

- Roster
Updated: 6 October 2022

== Season by season ==
Season	Regular season					Playoffs	Head coach
Season	G	W	L	PCT	Pos	Playoffs	Head coach
1997	21	14	17	0.667	2nd	Semifinal	Kim Dong-gwang
1997–98	45	18	27	0.400	8th	Did not qualify	Kang Jung-soo
1998–99	45	22	23	0.489	7th	Did not qualify	Kang Jung-soo
1999–2000	45	21	24	0.467	5th	Semifinal	Kim In-geon
2000–01	45	26	19	0.578	4th	Semifinal	Kim In-geon
2001–02	54	28	26	0.519	6th	First round	Kim In-geon
2002–03	54	22	32	0.407	8th	Did not qualify	Jung Deok-hwa
2003–04	54	18	36	0.333	9th	Did not qualify	Jung Deok-hwa
2004–05	54	33	21	0.611	3rd	Semifinal	Kim Dong-gwang
2005–06	54	27	27	0.500	7th	Did not qualify	Kim Dong-gwang
2006–07	54	25	29	0.463	6th	First round	Kim Sang-shik (acting)
2007–08	54	30	24	0.556	4th	Semifinal	Yoo Do-hoon
2008–09	54	29	25	0.537	7th	Did not qualify	Lee Sang-beom
2009–10	54	16	38	0.296	8th	Did not qualify	Lee Sang-beom
2010–11	54	16	38	0.296	9th	Did not qualify	Lee Sang-beom
2011–12	54	36	18	0.667	2nd	Winners	Lee Sang-beom
2012–13	54	30	24	0.556	4th	Semifinal	Lee Sang-beom
2013–14	54	19	35	0.352	9th	Did not qualify	Lee Sang-beom
2014–15	54	23	31	0.426	8th	Did not qualify	Lee Dong-nam (acting)
2015–16	54	30	24	0.556	4th	Semifinal	Kim Seung-gi
2016–17	54	39	15	0.722	1st	Winners	Kim Seung-gi
2017–18	54	29	25	0.537	5th	Semifinal	Kim Seung-gi
2018–19	54	25	29	0.463	7th	Did not qualify	Kim Seung-gi
2019–20	43	26	17	0.605	3rd	Not held (Note: Playoffs were cancelled due to the COVID-19 pandemic in South Korea.)	Kim Seung-gi
2020–21	54	30	24	0.556	3rd	Winners	Kim Seung-gi
2021–22	54	32	22	0.593	3rd	Runners-up	Kim Seung-gi
2022–23	54	37	17	0.685	1st	Winners	Kim Sang-shik
2023–24	54	18	36	0.333	9th	Did not qualify	Kim Sang-shik
2024–25	54	25	29	0.463	6th	First round	Kim Sang-shik
2025–26	54	35	19	0.648	2nd	Semifinal	Yoo Do-hoon

== Honours ==
- Korean Basketball League championship

Winners (4): 2011–12, 2016–17, 2020–21, 2022–23
Runners-up (1): 2021–22

- Korean Basketball League regular season

Winners (2): 2016–17, 2022–23
Runners-up (3): 1997, 2011–12, 2025–26
