= 2011–12 KBL season =

- League: Korean Basketball League
- Sport: Basketball
- TV partner(s): KBS, KBS N Sports, MBC Sports+, SBS ESPN, OBS, SPOTV

Regular Season
- Season champions: Wonju Dongbu Promy
- Top scorer: (United States) Aaron Haynes (LG)

Finals

KBL seasons
- ← 2010–11 2012–13 →

The 2011–12 KB Kookmin Card Professional Basketball season was the 16th season of the Korean Basketball League.

== Regular season ==
RK	Team	G	W	L	PCT	GB	Tiebreaker
1	Wonju Dongbu Promy	54	44	10	0.815	–	–
2	Anyang KGC	54	36	18	0.667	8	–
3	Busan KT Sonicboom	54	31	23	0.574	13	4–2
4	Jeonju KCC Egis	54	31	23	0.574	13	2–4
5	Ulsan Mobis Phoebus	54	29	25	0.537	15	–
6	Incheon ET Land Elephants	54	26	28	0.481	18	–
7	Changwon LG Sakers	54	21	33	0.389	23	–
8	Goyang Orions	54	20	34	0.370	24	–
9	Seoul SK Knights	54	19	35	0.352	25	–
10	Seoul Samsung Thunders	54	13	41	0.241	31	–

== Playoffs ==
1st Round
4	KCC	0
5	Mobis	3
3	KT	3
6	ET Land	2

Semifinals
1	Dongbu	3
5	Mobis	1
2	KGC	3
3	KT	1

Finals
1	Dongbu	2
2	KGC	4

== Prize money ==
- Wonju Dongbu Promy: KRW 100,000,000 (regular-season 1st place)
- Anyang KGC: KRW 50,000,000 (regular-season 2nd place)
- Busan KT Sonicboom: KRW 30,000,000 (regular-season 3rd place)
