= 2009–10 KBL season =

- League: Korean Basketball League
- Sport: Basketball
- Duration: October 15, 2009 – April 11, 2010
- TV partner(s): KBS, MBC-ESPN, SBS Sports, OBS, MBC-LIFE

Regular Season
- Season champions: Ulsan Mobis Phoebus
- Season MVP: (South Korea) Ham Ji-hoon (Mobis)
- Top scorer: (United States) Greg Stevenson (LG)

Finals
- Champions: Ulsan Mobis Phoebus
- Runners-up: Jeonju KCC Egis
- Finals MVP: (South Korea) Ham Ji-hoon (Mobis)

KBL seasons
- ← 2008–09 2010–11 →

The 2009–10 KCC Professional Basketball season was the 14th season of the Korean Basketball League.

== Regular season ==
RK	Team	G	W	L	PCT	GB	Tiebreaker
1	Ulsan Mobis Phoebus	54	40	14	0.741	–	3–3, +48
2	Busan KT Sonicboom	54	40	14	0.741	–	3–3, –48
3	Jeonju KCC Egis	54	35	19	0.648	5	–
4	Changwon LG Sakers	54	34	20	0.630	6	–
5	Wonju Dongbu Promy	54	33	21	0.611	7	–
6	Seoul Samsung Thunders	54	26	28	0.481	14	–
7	Seoul SK Knights	54	16	38	0.296	24	4–2
8	Anyang KT&G Kites	54	16	38	0.296	24	2–4
9	Incheon ET Land Elephants	54	15	39	0.278	25	4–2
10	Daegu Orions	54	15	39	0.278	25	2–4

== Playoffs ==
1st Round
4	LG	0
5	Dongbu	3
3	KCC	3
6	Samsung	1

Semifinals
1	Mobis	3
5	Dongbu	1
2	KT	1
3	KCC	3

Finals
1	Mobis	4
3	KCC	2

2009–2010 KBL Champions
Ulsan Mobis Phoebus
3rd title

== Prize money ==
- Ulsan Mobis Phoebus: KRW 200,000,000 (champions + regular-season 1st place)
- Jeonju KCC Egis: KRW 80,000,000 (runners-up + regular-season 3rd place)
- Busan KT Sonicboom: KRW 50,000,000 (regular-season 2nd place)
