= Daegu KOGAS Pegasus =

South Korean professional basketball team

- League: Korean Basketball League
- Founded: 1994; 32 years ago
- History: Daewoo Securities Basketball Team; 1994–1997; Incheon Daewoo Zeus; 1997–1999; Incheon Shinsegi Bigs; 1999–2001; Incheon SK Bigs; 2001–2003; Incheon Electroland Black Slamer; 2003–2009; Incheon Electroland Elephants 2009–2021; Daegu KOGAS Pegasus; 2021–present
- Arena: Daegu Gymnasium
- Capacity: 3,867
- Location: Daegu, South Korea
- Team colours: Dark blue, white
- Head coach: Kang Hyuk
- Team captain: Cha Ba-wee
- Affiliation: KOGAS
- Website: https://pegasus.kbl.or.kr/
Home	Away

The Daegu KOGAS Pegasus (Korean: 대구 한국가스공사 페가수스) is a professional basketball club in the Korean Basketball League (KBL). Founded in 1994, the team has been playing in the KBL since the inaugurate 1997 season. Since 2021, the club is based at Daegu Gymnasium in Daegu after relocating from Incheon.

== Current roster ==
Note: Flags indicate national team eligibility at FIBA-sanctioned events. Players may hold other non-FIBA nationalities not displayed.

Daegu KOGAS Pegasus roster
Players
Coaches

Pos.	No.	Nat.	Name	Ht.	Wt.	Age
G	0	(South Korea)	An Se-young	1.80 m (5 ft 11 in)		26 – 3 November 2000
F	1	(South Korea)	Shin Joo-young	2.00 m (6 ft 7 in)		24 – 15 June 2002
F	2	(South Korea)	Shin Seung-min	1.95 m (6 ft 5 in)		28 – 25 March 1998
G	3	(South Korea)	Jeong Seong-woo	1.78 m (5 ft 10 in)		33 – 17 August 1993
G	4	(South Korea)	Kim Nak-hyeon	1.84 m (6 ft 0 in)		31 – 12 March 1995
G	5	(South Korea)	Woo Dong-hyun	1.76 m (5 ft 9 in)		30 – 18 September 1996
G/F	6	(South Korea)	Cha Ba-wee (C)	1.92 m (6 ft 4 in)		37 – 24 August 1989
G/F	7	(South Korea)	Jo Sang-yeol	1.89 m (6 ft 2 in)		37 – 6 April 1989
F	8	(South Korea)	Park Ji-hoon	1.93 m (6 ft 4 in)		37 – 19 June 1989
SF	9	(South Korea)	Jeon Hyun-woo	1.94 m (6 ft 4 in)		30 – 3 June 1996
F	11	(South Korea)	Yang Jae-hyuk	1.91 m (6 ft 3 in)		29 – 8 March 1997
C	13	(South Korea)	Kim Dong-ryang	1.98 m (6 ft 6 in)		38 – 11 November 1987
G	17	(South Korea)	Kwon Soon-woo	1.87 m (6 ft 2 in)		23 – 7 December 2002
G	23	(South Korea)	Kim Tae-ho	1.87 m (6 ft 2 in)		27 – 22 September 1999
F/C	24	(South Korea)	Son Jun	1.99 m (6 ft 6 in)		26 – 22 October 2000
F	25	(South Korea)	Kim Jin-mo	1.96 m (6 ft 5 in)		27 – 24 November 1998
G	27	(Philippines)	SJ Belangel (AQ)	1.75 m (5 ft 9 in)		27 – 27 June 1999
C	31	(South Korea)	Kim Jun-yl	2.02 m (6 ft 8 in)		34 – 7 May 1992
C	33	(South Korea)	Kim Cheol-wook	2.02 m (6 ft 8 in)		34 – 25 June 1992
C	35	(Senegal)	Youssou Ndoye (I)	2.11 m (6 ft 11 in)		35 – 15 July 1991
F	37	(South Korea)	Kwak Jeong-hoon	1.87 m (6 ft 2 in)		28 – 24 July 1998
F	44	(Canada)	Andrew Nicholson (I)	2.06 m (6 ft 9 in)		36 – 8 December 1989
G	77	(South Korea)	Lee Do-heon	1.84 m (6 ft 0 in)		29 – 29 October 1997

Head coach

- (South Korea) Kang Hyuk

Assistant coach(es)

- (South Korea) Kim Sang-young
- (South Korea) Lee Chan-young

Legend

- (C) Team captain
- (I) Import player
- (AQ) Asian Quota Player
- Injured

- Roster
Updated: 8 February 2025

== Season by season ==
Year	Regular season			Playoffs
Year	Position	Won	Lost	Playoffs
1997	6th	8	13	First round
1997–98	6th	22	23	First round
1998–99	3rd	27	18	First round
1999–00	10th	15	30	Did not qualify
2000–01	5th	23	22	First round
2001–02	4th	30	24	First round
2002–03	7th	23	31	Did not qualify
2003–04	4th	32	22	Semifinals
2004–05	10th	17	37	Did not qualify
2005–06	10th	8	46	Did not qualify
2006–07	9th	23	31	Did not qualify
2007–08	7th	29	25	Did not qualify
2008–09	6th	29	25	First round
2009–10	9th	15	39	Did not qualify
2010–11	2nd	38	16	Semifinals
2011–12	6th	26	28	First round
2012–13	3rd	33	21	Semifinals
2013–14	4th	28	26	First round
2014–15	6th	25	29	Semifinals
2015–16	10th	17	37	Did not qualify
2016–17	6th	26	28	First round
2017–18	6th	29	25	First round
2018–19	2nd	35	19	Runners-up
2019–20 (Note: The 2019–20 season was cut short due to the COVID-19 pandemic in South Korea.)	5th	21	21	Not held
2020–21	5th	27	27	Semifinals
2021–22	6th	27	27	First round
2022–23	9th	18	36	Did not qualify
2023–24	7th	21	33	Did not qualify
2024–25	5th	28	26	First round
2025–26	9th	17	37	Did not qualify

== Honours ==
- Korean Basketball League championship

Runners-up: 2018–19

- Korean Basketball League regular season

Runners-up: 2010–11, 2018–19

- KBL Pro-Am

Runners-up: 2012
