= Seoul SK Knights =

South Korean basketball team

Seoul SK Knights 서울 SK 나이츠
- League: Korean Basketball League
- Established: 1997; 29 years ago
- History: Cheongju Jinro McCass; 1997; Cheongju SK Knights; 1997–2001; Seoul SK Knights; 2001–present
- Arena: Jamsil Students' Gymnasium
- Capacity: 5,400
- Location: Seoul, South Korea
- Team colours: Red, orange, white
- Head coach: Chun Hee-chul
- Ownership: Chey Tae-won
- Affiliation: SK Telecom
- Championships: 3 Korean Leagues
- Retired numbers: 10 Moon Kyung-eun; 13 Chun Hee-chul
- Website: sksports.net/Knights
Home	Away

The Seoul SK Knights (Korean: 서울 SK 나이츠) is a professional basketball club in the Korean Basketball League. The club was originally founded by Jinro Group in 1997 as Cheongju Jinro McCass. Before the official launch of the basketball club, Jinro Group filed for bankruptcy due to the 1997 Asian financial crisis, and eventually sold the club to SK Telecom.

== Season by season ==
Year	Regular season			Playoffs
Year	Position	Won	Lost	Playoffs
1997–98	10th	13	32	Did not qualify
1998–99	8th	19	26	Did not qualify
1999–00	2nd	32	13	Champions
2000–01	3rd	30	15	Semifinals
2001–02	2nd	32	22	Runners-up
2002–03	10th	16	38	Did not qualify
2003–04	7th	19	35	Did not qualify
2004–05	8th	24	30	Did not qualify
2005–06	9th	24	30	Did not qualify
2006–07	7th	24	30	Did not qualify
2007–08	5th	29	25	First round
2008–09	8th	24	30	Did not qualify
2009–10	7th	16	38	Did not qualify
2010–11	7th	20	34	Did not qualify
2011–12	9th	19	35	Did not qualify
2012–13	1st	44	10	Runners-up
2013–14	3rd	37	17	Semifinals
2014–15	3rd	37	17	First round
2015–16	9th	20	34	Did not qualify
2016–17	7th	23	31	Did not qualify
2017–18	2nd	36	18	Champions
2018–19	9th	20	34	Did not qualify
2019–20 (Note: The 2019–20 season was cut short due to the COVID-19 pandemic in South Korea.)	1st	28	15	Not held
2020–21	8th	24	30	Did not qualify
2021–22	1st	40	14	Champions
2022–23	3rd	36	18	Runners-up
2023–24	4th	31	23	First round
2024–25	1st	41	13	Runners-up
2025–26	4th	32	22	First round

== Honours ==
=== Domestic ===
- Korean Basketball League championship

Winners (3): 1999–2000, 2017–18, 2021–22
Runners-up (4): 2001–02, 2012–13, 2022–23, 2024–25

- Korean Basketball League regular season

Winners (3): 2012–13, 2021–22, 2024–25
Runners-up (3): 1999–2000, 2001–02, 2017–18

- KBL Cup

Winners: 2021
Runners-up: 2020

=== Continental ===
- FIBA Asia Champions Cup

Third place: 2018

- East Asia Super League

Runners-up: 2019
