= Korean Basketball League =

South Korean professional men's basketball league

- KBL Logo
- Organising body: Korea Basketball Association
- Founded: 1997
- First season: 1997
- Country: South Korea
- Federation: Korea Basketball Association
- Confederation: FIBA Asia
- Divisions: 1
- Number of teams: 10
- Level on pyramid: 1
- Feeder to: Basketball Champions League Asia; East Asia Super League
- Domestic cup: KBL Cup
- Current champions: Busan KCC Egis (7th title) (2025–26)
- Most championships: Busan KCC Egis; Ulsan Hyundai Mobis Phoebus (both 7 titles)
- Most appearances: Joo Hee-jung (1,009 matches)
- All-time top scorer: Seo Jang-hoon (13,231 pts.)
- President: Kim Hee-ok
- TV partners: tvN Sports; IB SPORTS; TVING
- Website: KBL official website

The Korean Basketball League (Korean: 한국프로농구) or simply KBL is a professional men's basketball league in South Korea which was established in 1997. The league consists of ten teams and each team plays a total of 54 games (27 home and 27 away) in the regular season.

== History ==
The Korean Basketball League was established in 1997. Prior to the professional era, domestic basketball was an amateur sport and all teams, whether sponsored by a corporate company or a university, participated in the National Basketball Festival (농구대잔치), a competition sanctioned by the Korea Basketball Association. Early teams were sponsored by major companies or universities. The Korea Development Bank (KDB) and Industrial Bank of Korea (IBK) established their basketball teams as early as the 1950s and 1960s while Yonsei University and Korea University are considered pioneers of domestic college basketball, having introduced the sport to their institutions before World War II. During the 1970s and 1980s, major industrial companies such as Kia Motors, Hyundai Electronics and Samsung Electronics started their own basketball teams. The predecessor teams of Goyang Orion Orions, Anyang KGC and Wonju DB Promy were founded during the 1990s by smaller-scale companies hoping to take advantage of the "basketball craze".

=== Professional era ===
The 1996–97 National Basketball Festival ended in January 1997, and the inaugural KBL season began one month later in February. The National Basketball Festival remains an amateur-only tournament to this day and is contested by university reserve teams, amateur teams and the Korea Armed Forces Athletic Corps's basketball team.

Sponsoring companies were given the option to register their basketball teams in the upcoming professional league. KDB and IBK opted to sell their teams; however, their new owners chose to re-start the teams as brand new franchises, only acquiring their players and staff but not inheriting the team's legacy or historical records. The founding teams were Busan Kia Enterprise, Gyeongnam LG Sakers, Daegu Tongyang Orions, Suwon Samsung Thunders, Wonju Naray Blue Bird, Anyang SBS Stars, Incheon Daewoo Zeus, Daejeon Hyundai Dynat, and Gwangju Nasan Flamans. Some of the teams, such as Anyang SBS Stars, had been based in Seoul but chose to move to another city. The plan was to have a team based in each geographical region rather than only centralized in the Seoul Capital Area. The 1997–98 season was the first full season played and the tenth team, Cheongju SK Knights, was added as a member. The KBL has had ten teams ever since.

The early years of the league were plagued by the financial instability, exacerbated by the 1997 Asian financial crisis which had impacted South Korea especially hard. As with other domestic sports leagues, the KBL was not immune to the economic fall-out. The KBL had difficulty finding a league sponsor for the 1997–98 season while teams were forced to cut costs. Between 1997 and 2001, five of the ten teams had changed ownership due to financial problems.

== Format ==
The KBL follows FIBA rules regarding standards of play and court dimensions.

For the regular season, the round-robin format is utilized as each team plays against every other team six times (three home and three away). A total of 54 games are played in six rounds. Only the top six teams in the regular season standings advance to the post-season playoffs.

== League structure ==
=== KBL Cup ===
The KBL Cup was first introduced in 2020 as a pre-season competition for all teams to test out their strengths before the commencement of the regular season.

It is generally held in September. Aside from the participation of all 10 teams of the KBL league, Sangmu Basketball Team also participates in the KBL Cup, making it a total of 11 teams.

=== Regular season ===
The regular season runs from October to early April. Each team plays against the other nine teams six times (3 home and 3 away). A total of 54 games are played in six rounds.

The annual KBL Award Ceremony takes place right after the end of the regular season.

Teams which failed to qualify for the post-season playoffs take a short break before commencing their off-season training to prepare them for the upcoming season.

=== Post-season playoffs ===
The playoffs usually begin a week after the end of the regular season.

Only the top six teams in the regular season standings advance to the post-season playoffs.

The qualification of the six teams for either the quarter-finals or semi-finals of the playoffs are determined by their regular season standings. The teams ranked from third to sixth qualify for the quarter-finals, and the teams ranked first and second earn an automatic advancement to the semi-finals.

The quarter-finals are played in a best-of-three format. The two winning teams of the quarter-finals then advance to the semi-finals.

The semi-finals are played in a best-of-five format. The two winning teams of the semi-finals then compete for the KBL championship title in the finals.

The finals are played in a best-of-seven format.

=== KBL All-Star Game ===
The KBL All-Star Game is held in mid-January every year. The event is usually held in Seoul, except for multiple occasions where it was held outside of Seoul (2007 in Ulsan, 2017 in Busan, and 2021 in Daegu).

Based on the 2021–22 All-Star Game format, five players from each of the ten teams are nominated for the All-Star fan vote. Only the top 24 players in the fan vote standings are selected to participate in the All-Star Game. The two players with the most number of votes form their respective teams by recruiting eleven players each, regardless of their original teams.

== Current clubs ==
Locations of the Korean Basketball League teams

Team	City	Arena	Capacity	Founded	Joined
Anyang Jung Kwan Jang Red Boosters	Anyang	Anyang Gymnasium	6,690	1992	1997
Busan KCC Egis	Busan	Busan Sajik Gymnasium	14,099	1978	1997
Changwon LG Sakers	Changwon	Changwon Gymnasium	6,000	1994	1997
Daegu KOGAS Pegasus	Daegu	Daegu Gymnasium	3,867	1994	1997
Goyang Sono Skygunners	Goyang	Goyang Gymnasium	6,216	1996	1997
Seoul Samsung Thunders	Seoul	Jamsil Arena	11,069	1978	1997
Seoul SK Knights	Seoul	Jamsil Students' Gymnasium	5,400	1997	
Suwon KT Sonicboom	Suwon	Suwon KT Sonicboom Arena	3,660	1997	
Ulsan Hyundai Mobis Phoebus	Ulsan	Dongchun Gymnasium	5,831	1986	1997
Wonju DB Promy	Wonju	Wonju Gymnasium	4,600	1996	1997

== Results ==
=== Finals ===
Year	Champions	Result	Runners-up	Finals MVP
1997	Busan Kia Enterprise	4–1	Wonju Naray Blue Bird	Kang Dong-hee (Kia)
1997–98	Daejeon Hyundai Dynat	4–3	Busan Kia Enterprise	Hur Jae (Kia)
1998–99	Daejeon Hyundai Dynat	4–1	Busan Kia Enterprise	Cho Sung-won (Hyundai)
1999–2000	Cheongju SK Knights	4–2	Daejeon Hyundai Gullivers	Seo Jang-hoon (SK)
2000–01	Suwon Samsung Thunders	4–1	Changwon LG Sakers	Joo Hee-jung (Samsung)
2001–02	Daegu Tongyang Orions	4–3	Seoul SK Knights	Marcus Hicks (Tongyang)
2002–03	Wonju TG Xers	4–2	Daegu Tongyang Orions	David Jackson (TG)
2003–04	Jeonju KCC Egis	4–3	Wonju TG Sambo Xers	Lee Sang-min (KCC)
2004–05	Wonju TG Sambo Xers	4–2	Jeonju KCC Egis	Kim Joo-sung (TG Sambo)
2005–06	Seoul Samsung Thunders	4–0	Ulsan Mobis Phoebus	Kang Hyuk (Samsung)
2006–07	Ulsan Mobis Phoebus	4–3	Busan KTF Magic Wings	Yang Dong-geun (Mobis)
2007–08	Wonju Dongbu Promy	4–1	Seoul Samsung Thunders	Kim Joo-sung (Dongbu)
2008–09	Jeonju KCC Egis	4–3	Seoul Samsung Thunders	Choo Seung-gyun (KCC)
2009–10	Ulsan Mobis Phoebus	4–2	Jeonju KCC Egis	Ham Ji-hoon (Mobis)
2010–11	Jeonju KCC Egis	4–2	Wonju Dongbu Promy	Ha Seung-jin (KCC)
2011–12	Anyang KGC	4–2	Wonju Dongbu Promy	Oh Se-keun (KGC)
2012–13	Ulsan Mobis Phoebus	4–0	Seoul SK Knights	Yang Dong-geun (Mobis)
2013–14	Ulsan Mobis Phoebus	4–2	Changwon LG Sakers	Moon Tae-young (Mobis)
2014–15	Ulsan Mobis Phoebus	4–0	Wonju Dongbu Promy	Yang Dong-geun (Mobis)
2015–16	Goyang Orion Orions	4–2	Jeonju KCC Egis	Lee Seung-hyun (Orion)
2016–17	Anyang KGC	4–2	Seoul Samsung Thunders	Oh Se-keun (KGC)
2017–18	Seoul SK Knights	4–2	Wonju DB Promy	Terrico White (SK)
2018–19	Ulsan Hyundai Mobis Phoebus	4–1	Incheon Electroland Elephants	Lee Dae-sung (Mobis)
2019–20	Cancelled due to the COVID-19 pandemic			
2020–21	Anyang KGC	4–0	Jeonju KCC Egis	Jared Sullinger (KGC)
2021–22	Seoul SK Knights	4–1	Anyang KGC	Kim Sun-hyung (SK)
2022–23	Anyang KGC	4–3	Seoul SK Knights	Oh Se-keun (KGC)
2023–24	Busan KCC Egis	4–1	Suwon KT Sonicboom	Heo Ung (KCC)
2024–25	Changwon LG Sakers	4–3	Seoul SK Knights	Heo Il-young (LG)
2025–26	Busan KCC Egis	4–1	Goyang Sono Skygunners	Heo Hoon (KCC)

=== Titles by club ===
Club	Titles	Runners-up	Winning seasons	Runner-up seasons
Busan KCC Egis	7	5	1997–98, 1998–99, 2003–04, 2008–09, 2010–11, 2023–24, 2025–26	1999–2000, 2004–05, 2009–10, 2015–16, 2020–21
Ulsan Hyundai Mobis Phoebus	7	3	1997, 2006–07, 2009–10, 2012–13, 2013–14, 2014–15, 2018–19	1997–98, 1998–99, 2005–06
Anyang Jung Kwan Jang Red Boosters	4	1	2011–12, 2016–17, 2020–21, 2022–23	2021–22
Wonju DB Promy	3	6	2002–03, 2004–05, 2007–08	1997, 2003–04, 2010–11, 2011–12, 2014–15, 2017–18
Seoul SK Knights	3	4	1999–2000, 2017–18, 2021–22	2001–02, 2012–13, 2022–23, 2024–25
Seoul Samsung Thunders	2	3	2000–01, 2005–06	2007–08, 2008–09, 2016–17
Goyang Sono Skygunners	2	2	2001–02, 2015–16	2002–03, 2025–26
Changwon LG Sakers	1	2	2024–25	2000–01, 2013–14
Suwon KT Sonicboom	0	2	—	2006–07, 2023–24
Daegu KOGAS Pegasus	0	1	—	2018–19

== Individual achievements ==
=== Awards ===
The KBL awards ceremony is held annually at the end of the regular season. As of the 2020–21 season, the following honours are awarded:

- Most Valuable Player (MVP)
- Rookie of the Year
- Foreign Player of the Year
- Best 5
- Defensive Player of the Year
- Sixth Man Award
- Skill Development Award
- Fair Play Award
- Play of the Season
- Popularity Award
- Coach of the Year

The awards ceremony takes place at the conclusion of the regular season, before the playoffs begin. The Playoffs MVP is only awarded at the conclusion of the final Championship game.

=== Top scorer ===
Year	Player	Team	Points per game
1997	(United States) Carl Ray Harris	Wonju Naray Blue Bird	32.3
1997–98	(United States) Larry Davis	Anyang SBS Stars	30.6
1998–99	(United States) Bernard Blunt	Changwon LG Sakers	29.9
1999–2000	(United States) Eric Eberz	Gwangju Goldbank Clickers	27.7
2000–01	(United States) Dennis Edwards	Anyang SBS Stars	33.4
2001–02	(United States) Eric Eberz (2)	Yeosu Korea Tender Prumi	28.3
2002–03	(United States Virgin Islands) (Saint Vincent and the Grenadines) Leon Trimmingham	Seoul SK Knights	27.4
2003–04	(Cameroon) (Canada) Charles Minlend	Jeonju KCC Egis	27.1
2004–05	(United States) Nate Johnson	Daegu Orions	28.7
2005–06	(United States) Dontae' Jones	Anyang KT&G Kites	29.2
2006–07	(United States) Pete Mickeal	Daegu Orions	35.1
2007–08	(United States) Terrence Shannon	Incheon ET Land Black Slamer	27.2
2008–09	(United States) Terrence Leather	Seoul Samsung Thunders	27.5
2009–10	(United States) Greg Stevenson	Changwon LG Sakers	21.9
2010–11	(United States) Aaron Haynes	Seoul Samsung Thunders	23.1
2011–12	(United States) Aaron Haynes (2)	Changwon LG Sakers	27.6
2012–13	(United States) Jasper Johnson	Busan KT Sonicboom	19.7
2013–14	(United States) Tyler Wilkerson	Jeonju KCC Egis	21.5
2014–15	(United States) Davon Jefferson	Changwon LG Sakers	21.3
2015–16	(United States) Andre Emmett	Jeonju KCC Egis	26.2
2016–17	(United States) Andre Emmett (2)	Jeonju KCC Egis	28.8
2017–18	(United States) David Simon	Anyang KGC	26.1
2018–19	(Central African Republic) James Mays	Changwon LG Sakers	26.6

== Draft ==
=== Domestic players ===
Domestic players, defined as possessing South Korean citizenship according to FIBA laws, are recruited through an annual rookie draft. The draft was held since 1998. In 2009, an ethnic draft was introduced to allow the recruitment of players who have acquired South Korean nationality, or either of their parents is a Korean. Players recruited through ethnic drafts are waived from being counted as an import player. However, due to the controversial nature of the recruitment rules and the backlash, the ethnic draft was eventually abolished in 2013.

=== Import players ===
From 2018, all teams are allowed to freely select their import players, subject to a "two-import" quota per team and a salary cap of $700,000. Only one foreign player is allowed to play on court in every quarter.

=== Asian player quota ===
In a move to further develop the quality of basketball in the country, the "Asian Player Quota" programme was introduced ahead of the 2020–21 season for Japanese players. This programme allows each team to recruit one Japanese player (excluding naturalized, dual citizenship and mixed race players) from Japan's B.League. Players recruited under the "Asian Player Quota" programme are excluded from the foreign player quota, and included in the domestic player salary cap. Wonju DB Promy became the first team in the league to recruit a Japanese player, as they inked a one-year deal with Taichi Nakamura. Ahead of the 2022–23 season, the programme was extended to Filipino players (owns a Philippine passport and both parents must have either Philippine citizenship or passport). In June 2022, Daegu KOGAS Pegasus becomes the first team to recruit a Filipino player, as they announced a two-year deal with SJ Belangel.

== Mandatory military service ==
Players of the Korean Basketball League are eligible to apply to fulfil their military service obligations as members of the Korea Armed Forces Athletic Corps. Alongside military duties, they are allowed to train as professional athletes and play for the Sangmu Basketball Team. Successful applicants officially enlist in May or June and are discharged eighteen months later in January, returning to the team rosters for the final rounds of the regular season.

== See also ==
- List of South Korean basketball players
- Women's Korean Basketball League (WKBL)
