= Goyang Gymnasium =

Indoor sporting arena in Goyang, South Korea

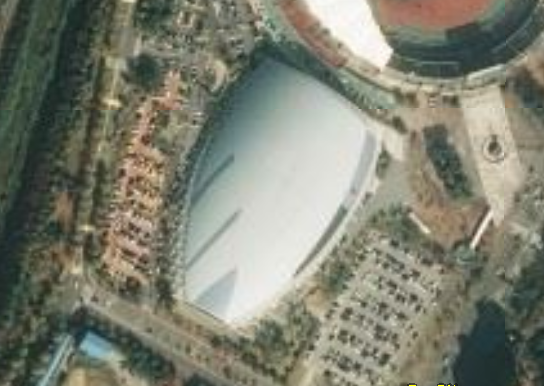
- Interactive map of Goyang Gymnasium
- Location: 1601 Daehwa-dong, Ilsanseo-gu, Goyang, Gyeonggi-do, South Korea
- Coordinates: 37.674551°N 126.741964°E
- Owner: City of Goyang
- Operator: Goyang City Facility Management Corporation
- Capacity: 6,216
- Field size: 423,775 square feet (39,370.0 m^{2})

Construction
- Opened: July 2011

Tenants
- Goyang Sono Skygunners (2011–present); 2014 Asian Games

Goyang Gymnasium (Korean: 고양체육관), also known as Goyang Indoor Stadium or Goyang Sono Arena due to sponsorship reasons, is an indoor sporting arena. It is part of Goyang Sports Complex, located in Goyang, South Korea. The capacity of the arena is 6,216 for basketball matches. Goyang Sono Skygunners of the Korean Basketball League are the tenants. The venue hosted fencing at the 2014 Asian Games.
