= Ulsan Hyundai Mobis Phoebus =

Ulsan Hyundai Mobis Phoebus 울산 현대모비스 피버스
- League: Korean Basketball League
- Established: 1986; 40 years ago
- History: Kia Motors Basketball Team; 1986–1996; Busan Kia Enterprise; 1997–2001; Ulsan Mobis Automons; 2001–2004; Ulsan Mobis Phoebus; 2004–2017; Ulsan Hyundai Mobis Phoebus; 2017–present
- Arena: Dongchun Gymnasium (Capacity: 5,831)
- Location: Ulsan, South Korea
- Team colours: Red, dark blue, white
- General manager: Yoo Jae-hak
- Team manager: Lee Seung-min
- Head coach: Yang Dong-geun
- Team captain: Ham Ji-hoon
- Ownership: Jo Seong-hwan
- Affiliation: Hyundai Mobis
- Championships: 7 Korean Leagues
- Retired numbers: 6 Yang Dong-geun; 10 Woo Ji-won; 14 Kim Yoo-taek
- Website: phoebus.kbl.or.kr
Home	Away

Ulsan Hyundai Mobis Phoebus are a professional basketball team based in Ulsan, South Korea. The club competes in the Korean Basketball League (KBL).

== History ==
=== Foundation and amateur era ===
Before the professional Korean Basketball League was established in 1997, domestic basketball was an amateur sport and teams were sponsored by companies or private universities. Ulsan Hyundai Mobis Phoebus traces its origins to the basketball team sponsored by Kia Motors in 1986. The team was based in Busan where Kia Motors had manufacturing operations.

During the amateur era, all teams competed in the National Basketball Festival (농구대잔치). The Kia team dominated the late 1980s, despite being relatively new compared to Samsung Electronic and Hyundai's teams (now Seoul Samsung Thunders and Jeonju KCC Egis, respectively). Their roster at that time consisted of the legendary Chung-Ang University quartet: centers Han Ki-bum and Kim Yoo-taek, all-rounded shooting guard Hur Jae and record-breaking point guard Kang Dong-hee. The "Hur-Dong-Taek Trio" would later be retrospectively dubbed the most formidable offensive unit of the amateur era.

=== Professional era (1997–2001) ===
With the founding of the KBL, Kia chose to register its team and joined the league as Busan Kia Enterprise. They won the inaugural KBL Championship. Although they finished the next two seasons as championship runners-up, the team went through a period of upheaval. As with many major corporations, Kia Motors suffered from the 1997 Asian financial crisis, which had hit South Korea hard. Kia was bought over by Hyundai Motor Company in 1998 but the basketball team remained solely under Kia and retained the name. The team was unable to go through a generational change due to financial constraints and the aging squad found themselves behind other teams, especially a much younger Daejeon Hyundai Dynat team driven by the likes of Lee Sang-min and Choo Seung-gyun. Han had already retired by then while Hur and Kang both left for other teams for various reasons.

Hyundai then acquired the basketball team prior to the 2001–02 season as it was no longer feasible for Kia to sponsor a sports team. The team moved to its current home city of Ulsan.

=== Ulsan era (2001–present) ===
The first several seasons after the move were forgettable, as the newly-renamed Ulsan Mobis Automons mostly finished in the bottom half of the league table. Incumbent head coach Yoo Jae-hak, himself a former Kia player during the amateur era, was hired in 2004. At the rookie draft that year, Mobis won the lottery for the first overall pick and Yoo drafted Yang Dong-geun, who would go on to become the team's longest-serving player.

== Honours ==
=== Domestic ===
- Korean Basketball League championship

Winners (7): 1997, 2006–07, 2009–10, 2012–13, 2013–14, 2014–15, 2018–19
Runners-up (3): 1997–98, 1998–99, 2005–06

- Korean Basketball League regular season

Winners (7): 1997, 2005–06, 2006–07, 2008–09, 2009–10, 2014–15, 2018–19
Runners-up (5): 1998–99, 2012–13, 2013–14, 2015–16, 2020–21

- KBL Cup

Runners-up: 2022, 2023

=== Continental ===
- FIBA Asia Champions Cup

Winners: 1992
Runners-up: 1997

- ABA Club Championship

Runners-up: 2013
