= KBL Most Improved Player Award =

Korean Basketball award

The Korean Basketball League Most Improved Player Award (MIP) (Korean: 기량발전상) is an annual Korean Basketball League (KBL) award given since 1997 to the player who was deemed to have made the most improvement compared to the previous season.

== Winners ==
^	Denotes player who is still active in the KBL
Team (X)	Denotes the number of times a player from this team had won at that time

=== 1997 to 2010–11 ===
Season	Player	Position	Team
1997 (Note: Prior to the founding of the professional Korean Basketball League, the predecessor National Basketball Festival (농구대잔치) ended its final season in January 1997. The first season of the KBL began play in February 1997 to facilitate the transition. Since the 1997–98 season, the KBL season runs from October until April.)	Noh Ki-seok	Forward	Samsung Electronics
1997–98	Park Jae-hoen	Center	Gyeongnam LG Sakers
1998–99	Bong Ha-min	Guard	Busan Kia Enterprise
1999–00	Park Hoon-geun	Forward	Changwon LG Sakers (2)
2000–01	Jo Woo-hyun	Forward	Changwon LG Sakers (3)
2001–02	Cho Dong-hyun	Guard	Incheon SK Bigs
2002–03	Hwang Ji-won	Guard	Yeosu Korea Tender Purmi
2003–04	Pyo Myung-il	Guard	Jeonju KCC Egis
2004–05	Lee Byeong-seok	Forward	Ulsan Mobis Phoebus (2)
2005–06	Song Yeong-jin	Forward	Busan KTF Magic Wings (2)
2006–07	Kim Tae-hyeop	Guard	Wonju Dongbu Promy
2007–08	Lee Han-gwon	Forward	Incheon Electroland Black Slammer (2)
2008–09	Park Goo-young	Guard	Ulsan Mobis Phoebus (3)
2009–10	Park Jong-cheon	Forward	Ulsan Mobis Phoebus (4)
2010–11	Kim Dong-uk^	Forward	Seoul Samsung Thunders (2)

=== 2014–15 to present ===
The award was scrapped after the 2010–11 season and revived for the 2014–15 season.

Season	Player	Position	Team
2014–15	Lee Jae-do^	Guard	Busan KT Sonicboom (3)
2015–16	Heo Ung^	Guard	Wonju DB Promy (2)
2016–17	Song Kyo-chang^	Forward	Jeonju KCC Egis (2)
2017–18	Kim Tae-hong	Forward	Wonju DB Promy (3)
2017–18	Yang Hong-seok^	Forward	Busan KT Sonicboom (4)
2019–20 (Note: The league was canceled in the middle of the fifth round of the regular season, due to the COVID-19 pandemic. The playoffs were also canceled as a result.)	Kim Nak-hyeon^	Guard	Incheon Electroland Elephants (3)
2020–21	Jung Chang-yeong^	Guard	Jeonju KCC Egis (3)
2021–22	Jung Seong-woo^	Guard	Suwon KT Sonicboom (5)
2022–23	Ha Yun-gi^	Center	Suwon KT Sonicboom (6)
2023–24	Lee Jung-hyun^	Guard	Goyang Sono Skygunners
2024–25	Yang Jun-suk^	Guard	Changwon LG Sakers (4)
2025–26	Seo Myeong-jin^	Guard	Ulsan Hyundai Mobis Phoebus (5)
