= KBL Playoffs Most Valuable Player Award =

Annual Korean Basketball League award

The Korean Basketball League Playoffs Most Valuable Player Award (Playoffs MVP) (Korean: 플레이오프 MVP) is an annual Korean Basketball League (KBL) award given since 1997 to the best performing player of the playoffs.

At the conclusion of the regular season, the top two ranked teams automatically qualify for the semifinals while the third to sixth-ranked teams qualify for the quarterfinals stage. The award specifically recognizes players for their performances during the playoffs, without taking into account of their record during the regular season. The awardee is selected by press vote.

Hur Jae is the only player to have won the award as a member of the runner-up team. Future regular season MVPs Joo Hee-jung and Oh Se-keun both won the award during their rookie season.

== Winners ==
^	Denotes player who is still active in the KBL
†	Denotes player whose team won championship that year
Player (X)	Denotes the number of times the player had been named Playoffs MVP at that time
Player (in italic text)	Denotes player who also won the KBL Most Valuable Player Award
Team (X)	Denotes the number of times a player from this team had won at that time

Season	Player	Position	Team
1997† (Note: Prior to the founding of the professional Korean Basketball League, the predecessor National Basketball Festival (농구대잔치) ended its final season in January 1997. The first season of the KBL began play in February 1997 to facilitate the transition. Since the 1997–98 season, the KBL season runs from October until April.)	Kang Dong-hee	G	Busan Kia Enterprise
1997–98	Hur Jae	G	Busan Kia Enterprise (2)
1998–99†	Cho Sung-won	G	Daejeon Hyundai Dynat
1999–00†	Seo Jang-hoon	C	Cheongju SK Knights
2000–01†	Joo Hee-jung	G	Suwon Samsung Thunders
2001–02†	(United States) Marcus Hicks	F	Daegu Tongyang Orions
2002–03†	(United States) David Jackson	G	Wonju TG Xers
2003–04†	Lee Sang-min	G	Jeonju KCC Egis (2)
2004–05†	Kim Joo-sung	F/C	Wonju TG Sambo Xers (2)
2005–06†	Kang Hyuk	G	Seoul Samsung Thunders (2)
2006–07†	Yang Dong-geun	G	Ulsan Mobis Phoebus (3)
2007–08†	Kim Joo-sung	F/C	Wonju Dongbu Promy (3)
2008–09†	Choo Seung-gyun	F	Jeonju KCC Egis (3)
2009–10†	Ham Ji-hoon^	F	Ulsan Mobis Phoebus (4)
2010–11†	Ha Seung-jin	C	Jeonju KCC Egis (5)
2011–12†	Oh Se-keun^	C	Anyang KGC
2012–13†	Yang Dong-geun (2)	G	Ulsan Mobis Phoebus (5)
2013–14†	Moon Tae-young	F	Ulsan Mobis Phoebus (6)
2014–15†	Yang Dong-geun (3)	G	Ulsan Mobis Phoebus (7)
2015–16†	Lee Seoung-hyun^	F/C	Goyang Orion Orions (2)
2016–17†	Oh Se-keun^ (2)	C	Anyang KGC (2)
2017–18†	(United States) Terrico White	G	Seoul SK Knights (2)
2018–19†	Lee Dae-sung^	G	Ulsan Hyundai Mobis Phoebus (8)
2019–20	Not awarded (Note: The league was canceled in the middle of the fifth round of the regular season, due to the COVID-19 pandemic. The playoffs were also canceled as a result.)		
2020–21†	(United States) Jared Sullinger	F	Anyang KGC (3)
2023–24†	Heo Ung^	G	Busan KCC Egis (6)
2024–25†	Heo Il-young^	F	Changwon LG Sakers
2025–26†	Heo Hoon^	G	Busan KCC Egis (7)
