= Hyun Joo-yup =

South Korean basketball player (born 1975)

Hyun Joo-yup 현주엽
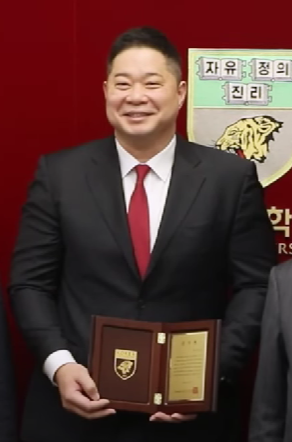
- Hyun during his visit in Korea University in 2023

Personal information
- Born: 27 July 1975 (age 51) Seoul, South Korea
- Listed height: 195 cm (6 ft 5 in)
- Listed weight: 284 lb (129 kg)

Career information
- High school: Whimoon High School (Seoul, South Korea)
- College: Korea University (1994–1998)
- KBL draft: 1998: 1st round, 1st overall pick
- Drafted by: Cheongju SK Knights
- Playing career: 1998–2009
- Position: Power forward
- Number: 32, 9
- Coaching career: 2017–2020

Career history

Playing
- 1998–1999: Cheongju SK Knights
- 1999–2005: Gwangju Goldbank Clickers / Yeosu Goldbank Clickers / Busan KTF Magic Wings
- 2001–2003: →Korea Armed Forces Athletic Corps
- 2005–2009: Changwon LG Sakers

Coaching
- 2017–2020: Changwon LG Sakers

Career highlights
- As player: KBL 20th Anniversary All-Time Legend 12 (2017); KBL 15th Anniversary Legend All-Star (2012); 6× KBL All-Star (1999, 2000, 2004, 2005, 2006, 2008); KBL Fair Play Award (2006); 2× KBL-CBA All-Star (2005, 2006); KBL Best 5 (2005); 2× KBL Player of the Month (January 2000, November 2004); Basketball Festival Finals MVP (2002); Basketball Festival Rebound Award (2002); ABC Champions Cup Dunk Contest Winner (1997)

Career KBL statistics
- Points: 5,389 (13.2 ppg)
- Rebounds: 1,674 (4.1 rpg)
- Assists: 2,095 (5.1 apg)
Medals
Event	1st	2nd	3rd
Asian Games	1	2	0
FIBA Asia Cup	1	2	0
East Asian Games	0	1	0
FIBA Asia Under-18 Championship	0	1	0
Total	2	6	0
Men's basketball
Representing South Korea
Asian Games
Silver medal – second place	1994 Hiroshima	Team
Silver medal – second place	1998 Bangkok	Team
Gold medal – first place	2002 Busan	Team
FIBA Asia Cup (formerly Asian Basketball Confederation Championship)
Silver medal – second place	1995 Seoul	Team
Gold medal – first place	1997 Riyadh	Team
Silver medal – second place	1999 Fukuoka	Team
East Asian Games
Silver medal – second place	1997 Busan	Team
FIBA Asia Under-18 Championship (formerly Asian Basketball Confederation Under-18 Championship)
Silver medal – second place	1992 Beijing	U-19; Team

Hyun Joo-yup

YouTube information
- Channel: mukboss Mr.JooYup
- Years active: 2021–present
- Genre: Variety
- Subscribers: 705 thousand
- Views: 217.5 million
- Last updated: June 21, 2023

- Hyun Joo-yup
- Hangul: 현주엽
- Hanja: 玄周燁
- RR: Hyeon Juyeop
- MR: Hyŏn Chuyŏp

Hyun Joo-yup (Note: Alternate spellings: Hyeon, Joo-yeop, Joo-yeob, Ju-yeop, Ju-yeob.) (Korean: 현주엽; Hanja: 玄周燁; born 27 July 1975) is a South Korean former professional basketball player and head coach. He is regarded as one of the greatest power forwards of all time in the Korean Basketball League (KBL). Hyun was given the moniker "Magic Hippo", "The Lord of the Military", "Point Forward" and "Korean Charles Barkley" for his size, versatility, and dominance. He is known for being the only player who broke the backboard in Korean basketball history.

Hyun's career coincided with the founding of the professional league, having been drafted at the first ever KBL draft. The former number one draft pick battled an injury-ravaged career which led to his retirement in 2009. In 2012, Hyun earned the KBL Legend All-Star selection. He was named into the KBL All-Time Legend 12 in 2017.

As a member of the senior national team for more than a decade, Hyun competed in two FIBA World Cups (1994, 1998), three Asian Games (1994, 1998, 2002), four FIBA Asia Cups (1995, 1997, 1999, 2005), one Summer Olympics Games (1996), and one East Asian Games (1997). Hyun is noted for leading the South Korean squad in winning its first Asian Games gold medal after 20 years during the 2002 Asian Games despite being injured.

After his retirement, Hyun had a broadcasting stint as a basketball commentator for MBC Sports Plus from 2014 until 2017 and was named 2017 Jumpball Commentator of the Year. He also served as the head coach of the Changwon LG Sakers for three seasons from 2017 before stepping down in 2020, leading them to a playoffs berth in 2019 after four years of being at the bottom.

Since 2015, Hyun has been appearing in Korean entertainment and variety shows.

== Early life ==
Hyun was born in Seoul, South Korea, the youngest of three sons. His father, Hyun Jin-gu (현진구; 玄晉具; 1944 – 2 April 2009) ran a garment manufacturing business. Hong Sung-hwa (홍성화; 洪性華), his mother, is a former national basketball player, which Hyun was unaware of until his second year in middle school, when she came to watch his game and his coach recognized her.

Hyun and basketball player Seo Jang-hoon attended the same school from elementary, middle school to high school. The two are childhood friends, the latter who is a year senior of the former was present in his elementary graduation in 1988.

=== Middle school and high school career ===
Hyun, who was a sixth grade student in Seoul Dosung Elementary School, applied for Whimoon Middle School and went to a tryout for the school’s basketball team. He was accepted to Whimoon but was rejected to be a part of the basketball squad since he failed to meet the required physique and skills. Hyun, who was a freshman at Whimoon, walked into the basketball tryout again, and in his second attempt, he was accepted. He started playing basketball at the age of 14.

Hyun’s friend, Seo Jang-hoon, whose first sport was baseball, picked up his interest in basketball around the same time as him. The inexperienced duo practiced together at the corners of the court. Hyun, who only stepped inside the court in his second year, was mostly benched during his first year together with Seo due to the lack of skills. The two benchwarmers would end up going to the swimming pool to watch the game from outside the court. Later on, the pair led their high school team to winning basketball matches.

In Hyun’s high school playing career, he is noted for setting the record for most points scored in a high school basketball game, a record that still stands to this day, scoring 63 points without playing full-time.

In an episode of the SBS TV show Finding Genius which aired on February 3, 2016, Hyun revealed that basketball player Seok Joo-il (Korean: 석주일), a teammate in middle school and high school, called him and Seo and he told the two of them to quit basketball since they don’t have any talent in playing. After hearing Seok’s words, Hyun said that it became his motivation to improve.

Determined to become good at basketball, Hyun taught himself by watching videos of his favorite basketball figure, NBA star Magic Johnson, who inspired him to play. In admiration for Johnson, he wore number 32.

Hyun garnered the attention of college scouts and was sought by prestigious universities in South Korea because of his promising ability. Billed as a high valued asset for his advantage to leap and shoot the ball as a big man, including his untapped potential in other aspects of the game, Hyun’s recruitment received a wide media coverage. The nation’s top two basketball colleges, Korea University and Yonsei University, were out in a fierce competition to land Hyun, who was a high school senior, on their teams. In a press conference on March 31, 1993, Hyun’s advancement to Korea University was made public.

In an interview, Hyun shared that he initially wanted to join Yonsei University, the leading college basketball team at that time, because he can win a championship ring easily without putting a lot of effort. However, his father, a graduate of Korea University, advised him that looking for an easy path in his basketball career will not help him progress, but instead it will lead to his decline because he will be staying inside his comfort zone and will not be seeing any growth. After much thought, Hyun decided to join the Anamgol Tigers to challenge himself to grow and develop as a player and help the runner-up Korea University beat the winning Yonsei University.

== College career ==
Hyun played for Korea University from 1994 to 1998 and led its success in the 1990s. Together with Chun Hee-chul, Yang Hee-seung, Kim Byung-chul (Korean: 김병철; Hanja: 金昞徹) and Shin Ki-sung, they were dubbed as Korea University's "Best Five". Due to Hyun's ability to dunk, he became a famous crowd-pleaser making the stadium roar. His size and strength earned him the nickname "Magic Hippo".

=== Injury ===
On September 20, 1996, Hyun underwent surgery at Kyung Hee University Hospital for the left ankle injury he incurred.

Due to excessive training and strenuous athletic movements to the knees which started during Hyun’s college career, he suffers from a condition called knee effusion, which occurs when too much fluid accumulates in the knee. Since then Hyun has been experiencing pain on his left knee.

== Professional career ==
=== Cheongju SK Knights (1998–1999) ===
Hyun was selected as the first overall pick in the 1998 KBL draft by the Cheongju SK Knights. He signed a five-year rookie contract totaling ₩1 billion KRW.

==== 1998–99: Rookie season and All-Star debut ====
In his debut on November 14, 1998, Hyun posted 26 points, six rebounds, eight assists and two steals, leading SK Knights to a 95–94 season-opening win over the Daegu Tongyang Orions.

In Hyun’s first season, he scored double-digits in 24 consecutive games which is the KBL’s longest streak of double-digit scoring as a rookie. He became the first ever rookie in the league to record a triple-double. Hyun made history for being the first rookie named to the KBL All-Star. In his first All-Star Game, Hyun scored six points, grabbed six rebounds, dished out two assists and tacked on two steals. Since Hyun made it to the All-Star list, he was shortlisted as South Korea’s delegate to the first Asian Basketball Super League (ABSL) held from June 5 to July 16 in eight different cities of the participating countries, which includes Korea, China and Japan.

Hyun played in 34 games, averaging 23.9 points, 6.4 rebounds and 4.6 assists per game.

==== 1999–00: Sophomore season ====
During his second season, Hyun played 15 games for the SK Knights and he recorded an average of 19.6 points, 4.7 rebounds and 6.2 assists per game.

=== Gwangju Goldbank Clickers (1999–2000) ===
On the evening of December 24, 1999, the day before the season trade deadline, Cheongju SK Knights traded Hyun to the Gwangju Goldbank Clickers in exchange for Cho Sang-hyun and ₩4 million KRW. Hyun found out that he was traded from a reporter and was caught off-guard with the news. In an interview following his trade, Hyun expressed his disappointment towards the team’s coach for not giving him a heads up that a deal will be made.

==== 1999–00: Sophomore season ====
Hyun, who was traded in the middle of the season, was named Player of the Month for January, receiving 38 out of 66 votes. During this month, he logged two triple-doubles and was ranked sixth in scoring (23.33 points per game), sixteenth in rebounds (7.5 rebounds per game) and second in assists (8.42 assists per game).

Hyun was named to the All-Star list for the second year in a row. He was also voted to the All-Star Best 5 by basketball commentators and reporters.

For the remainder of the season, Hyun played 27 games with his new team, averaging 23.7 points, 6.0 rebounds and 7.6 assists per game.

=== Yeosu Goldbank Clickers (2000–2001) ===
Following Hyun’s debut with the Goldbank Clickers, the team relocated from Gwangju to Yeosu, becoming the Yeosu Goldbank Clickers.

==== 2000–01: Injury ====
On February 14, 2001, Hyun, injured his right ankle and knee in a game against Daejeon Hyundai Gullivers. On February 21, he was diagnosed with two broken right ankle ligaments, inflamed and torn right ankle tendons, myositis and a knee joint damage. Hyun ended his season early with only 27 games played, averaging 16.7 points, 5.7 rebounds and 5.0 assists per game.

Hyun, who was supposed to make his third consecutive All-Star Game appearance, failed to participate in the event due to the right ankle injury he incurred.

Hyun underwent surgery at Samsung Medical Center before joining the military.

=== Sangmu or Korea Armed Forces Athletic Corps (2001–2003) ===
In June 2001, Hyun began his mandatory military service together with basketball players Shin Ki-sung, a teammate from college and the national team, and Kang Hyuk (Korean: 강혁; Hanja: 姜赫), who was also a national team member. While in the military, Hyun was selected to play for the Sangmu or Korea Armed Forces Athletic Corps.

==== 2001–02: Finals MVP and injury ====
Hyun, who was still rehabbing the injuries he incurred in the previous year, led the past year’s tournament runner-up to victory during the 2001–02 Basketball Festival (officially known as the Sewon Telecom Basketball Festival for sponsorship reasons). During the final game on January 16, 2002, he logged a double-double with 25 points and 17 rebounds in an 87–84 win over Chung-Ang University, ending their third championship winning streak. Hyun, who only scored eight points in the first half, succeeded in a reverse layup at the end of the third quarter making the score 63–61. In the fourth quarter, Hyun scored 17 points helping Sangmu claim the championship title. This led to people calling him "The Lord of the Military". Hyun was eventually named the Finals MVP and he received the Rebound Award.

After his Sangmu championship, Hyun injured his left knee cartilage twice and received two surgeries in 2002. His first operation was on February 19 at Samsung Medical Center, Hyun underwent arthroscopic surgery on the left knee femur for his injured cartilage. Hyun, who was still experiencing pain on his left knee and rehabilitating at that time, was highly discouraged by his doctor to take part in the 2002 Asian Games. Despite the doctor’s advice, Hyun still played and led South Korea to win its first gold medal in 20 years. After his participation in the continental games in October, Hyun suffered from the same injury once more. On December 20, Hyun underwent his second left knee cartilage surgery at Samsung Medical Center.

==== 2002–03: Injury ====
In 2003, Hyun failed to play for Sangmu as he incurred an injury on his left knee cartilage for the third time. Hyun’s case was considered alarming and risky since he received two operations in the previous year after suffering from the same injury twice. In a statement, Busan KTF Magic Wings Director Chu Il-seung (Korean: 추일승; Hanja: 秋壹勝) said that there was barely cartilage left in Hyun’s knee. Hence, performing the third left knee surgery will be complicated due to the difficult method of culturing and transplanting cartilage tissue. Hyun was advised by experts to get treatment abroad but was not able to do so since he was an active duty soldier. According to the South Korea law, active duty soldiers are only allowed to get treatment overseas if it is a fatal case that cannot be treated in Korea. Eventually, Hyun did not opt for a surgery, instead, he underwent rehabilitation program at Samsung Medical Center for his injured left knee cartilage.

Hyun was discharged from the military in August 2003, after 26 months of mandatory service.

=== Busan KTF Magic Wings (2003–2005) ===
After finishing his military service in 2003, Hyun returned to the Yeosu Goldbank Clickers whose named changed to Yeosu Korea Tender Purmi in 2001. Upon Hyun’s return, the team once again relocated, moving from Yeosu to Busan, becoming the Busan Korea Tender Maxten. However, due to financial difficulties, the team was sold to KTF. Hence, the change of name to Busan KTF Magic Wings.

==== 2003–04: Return ====
Hyun, who suffered from a string of injuries, returned to the All-Star stage after three seasons. Hyun was voted to the 2004 All-Star Game by coaches, earning his third All-Star selection.

Hyun played in 44 games during the season, he posted an average of 12.9 points, 3.4 rebounds and 5.9 assists per game.

==== 2004–05: Playoffs debut and MVP race ====
In 2004, Hyun was named Player of the Month for November, receiving 45 out of 73 votes. He averaged 13.7 points (ranked twenty-fourth), 3.4 rebounds (ranked twenty-seventh), 8.3 assists (ranked third) and 1.2 steals (ranked twenty-fifth) per game during this month. Despite not being the leading player in points, rebounds, assists or steals, Hyun’s defensive ability made him the winning candidate. In particular, prolific tall shooters Seo Jang-hoon (of Seoul Samsung Thunders) and Kim Joo-sung (of Wonju TG Sambo Xers) could not score over 10 points against Hyun who was in charge of playing defense against them.

In 2005, Hyun was selected to play in the first All-Star Game between the KBL and the CBA. The first game was held in Seoul, South Korea on January 28, where South Korea won 85–82. The second game was held in Harbin, China on January 30, where the host country won 93–77.

Hyun was then named to his fourth All-Star Game appearance. Hyun, who was voted by fans, made it to the All-Star Best 5 list after four seasons.

During this season, he logged 13 double-doubles, the most for the forward position. Hyun’s averages increased to 14.2 points and 3.6 rebounds per game and he was referred to as "Point Forward" for recording the most number of assists for the forward position and ranking second in the season’s assists leaders with a career-high 7.83 assists per game.

With Hyun leading the team, the Busan KTF Magic Wings finished the season 32–22, showing a 13-game improvement from the previous year which helped them qualify for the playoffs after two years. Despite Hyun’s effort, the team was eventually eliminated by the Seoul Samsung Thunders after losing in the first two games. Hyun posted an average of 23.0 points, 8.0 rebounds and 6.5 assists per game — all of which are his playoffs career-highs.

Hyun came in second place in voting for the season MVP award with 16 votes. Subsequently, he was voted into the KBL Best 5.

=== Changwon LG Sakers (2005–2009) ===
Hyun became a free agent in the offseason, he then signed a five-year deal with the Changwon LG Sakers.

==== 2005–06 ====
In Hyun’s first season with the Changwon LG Sakers, he received an annual salary of ₩360 million KRW, becoming the second highest paid player for the 2005–06 season (following Seo Jang-hoon of the Seoul Samsung Thunders with ₩380 million KRW).

In 2006, Hyun was once again named to the South Korean roster for the second KBL-CBA All-Star, making it his second consecutive appearance. The first game was held on January 22, in Seoul, South Korea where the host country won 96–86. The second game was on January 24, in Jiyuan, China where China won 104–85.

Hyun, who was voted by coaches, made his fifth All-Star appearance.

Hyun received the 2006 KBL Exemplary Player award after being selected by the league's referees and technical committee for his professional conduct on the court.

During this season, Hyun did not miss a single game, he played a career-high 54 games and he averaged 11.2 points, 4.3 rebounds and 5.3 assists per game.

==== 2006–07: Injury ====
On January 21, 2007, Hyun injured his left ankle and knee during a game against the Jeonju KCC Egis. On January 24, diagnosis revealed that he suffered from a left ankle sprain and a left knee meniscus injury.

Hyun, who was hampered by injuries, appeared in 46 games and saw a decline in his season averages, posting 9.3 points, 3.7 rebounds and 3.4 assists per game. This was the first time he recorded a single-digit scoring average.

Hyun delayed his knee surgery so he can participate in the semifinals of the playoffs against his former team, the Busan KTF Magic Wings. Hyun averaged 12.0 points, 2.5 rebounds and 2.0 assists over four games. The LG Sakers was eventually eliminated.

On May 8, Hyun went under the knife for his third left knee cartilage surgery.

==== 2007–08 ====
Hyun was once again voted to the All-Star lineup by coaches, marking his sixth and last appearance. He logged a game-high nine 3-point shots (alongside Seo Jang-hoon).

Since Hyun postponed his surgery in the previous season, his condition worsened which affected his performance during the season. Despite his physical decline, Hyun played in 53 out of 54 games and he registered a career-low 7.9 points per game. His average for rebounds was the same as the previous year at 3.7, while his assists average increased to 4.0.

The LG Sakers moved into the first round of the playoffs but was eventually eliminated by the Seoul Samsung Thunders after losing in the first two games. During the playoffs, Hyun averaged 7.5 points, 3.5 rebounds and 2.0 assists per game.

==== 2008–09: Injury ====
Due to his recurring left knee cartilage injury, Hyun recorded his worst performance in his nine years of playing professional basketball. Hyun, who appeared in 44 games, finished the season with career-low averages on scoring, rebounds and assists at 6.7 points, 2.2 rebounds and 3.3 assists per game.

Hyun, who only played in two of four games during the playoffs, registered an average of 6.0 points, 1.0 rebounds, and 1.5 assists per game — all of which are his playoffs career-lows. The Seoul Samsung Thunders eliminated the LG Sakers in the first round.

During the offseason, on May 7, 2009, Hyun underwent knee arthroscopy, his fourth left knee cartilage surgery at Samsung Medical Center.

=== Retirement ===
After four left knee cartilage surgeries, Hyun decided to leave the hardwood. The Changwon LG Sakers announced Hyun’s retirement.

Hyun, who had been rehabbing his knee and still had a year left on his contract with the LG Sakers, formally concluded his career after nine seasons, in a press conference on June 25, 2009.

=== Post-retirement ===
In 2012, when the KBL celebrated its twelfth anniversary, Hyun was selected to play for the Legend All-Star Game. Hyun, who received the most fan votes, came in first place in the Dream Team (while Lee Sang-min was voted first in the Magic Team).

In 2017, during the KBL’s twentieth anniversary, Hyun was named to the All-Time Legend 12. The award was given to four guards, six forwards and two centers. Hyun was selected as a Legend for the forward position (alongside Aaron Haynes, Johnny McDowell, Chun Hee-chul, Choo Seung-gyun and Moon Kyung-eun).

== National team career ==
=== Junior national team ===
==== FIBA Asia Under-18 Championship ====
Hyun first represented South Korea when he was selected to be a part of the South Korean national under-19 basketball team. He played at the 1992 Asian Basketball Confederation Under-18 Championship, now called FIBA Asia Under-18 Championship, in Beijing, where they won the silver medal, after losing in the final game to the tournament's host team, China, with a score of 80–93.

==== FIBA Asia Under-21 Championship ====
Hyun competed for South Korea at the 1993 FIBA Under-21 World Championship, a now defunct age group competition, in Valladolid, where they finished in eleventh place after a 96–87 victory against Chinese Taipei in the classification round. During the tournament, Hyun played in five of seven games, missing out on the match against Angola and France. He scored 8.0 points per game, on top of recording a 66.7% free throw percentage.

At the 1997 FIBA Under-21 World Championship in Melbourne, Hyun recorded a tournament-high 32 points against Australia on August 3, 1997. Hyun was the top performer of the team, averaging 18.0 points, 4.3 rebounds and 2.1 assists over 7 games, while shooting 41.1% from the field, in addition to posting a 73.1% free throw percentage. Hyun led the team in scoring and defensive rebounds, and was also the tournament's top scorer. South Korea finished in the ninth place after a 78–62 win against Egypt in the classification match.

=== Senior national team ===
After competing for the South Korean junior team, Hyun was selected to play for the senior team. He was a part of the South Korean senior national basketball team for more than ten years and he regularly played from mid-1990s to mid-2000s. Hyun often wore number 9 and 15 when playing on the international stage. He became the second college freshman who was selected to play in the senior national team, following Hur Jae.

==== FIBA World Championship ====
19-year-old college freshman Hyun, who was the youngest member of the team, made his debut for the senior national team at the 1994 FIBA World Championship in Toronto. In his debut match against Australia on August 4, 1994, he scored six points, grabbed two rebounds and dished out an assist. Hyun averaged 3.7 points and 3.7 rebounds over three games. South Korea won in the semifinals against Egypt with 76–69, claiming the thirteenth rank in the tournament.

At the 1998 FIBA World Championship held in the city of Athens and Piraeus, Hyun played for the South Korean squad in four of five games, missing out on the match against Brazil. Hyun averaged 10.0 points, 4.0 rebounds and 1.2 assists per game, on 50.0% shooting from the field. South Korea finished in the sixteenth place after a 75–72 loss to Senegal.

==== Asian Games ====
Hyun was named to the South Korean roster for the 1994 Asian Games in Hiroshima, where they finished runner-up, bringing home the silver medal in a 72–100 loss to China.

At the 1998 Asian Games in Bangkok, Hyun competed for South Korea, where they lost again in the gold medal game against rival team China, with a score of 92–112.

Hyun, who was admitted in the military for mandatory service, represented South Korea in the 2002 Asian Games in Busan. Prior to the tournament, Hyun’s left knee cartilage was operated. Despite experiencing pain on his left knee and the doctor’s advice to not participate, Hyun led South Korea to snatch the gold medal from China, headed by NBA player Yao Ming, in a 102–100 final score victory. Hyun, who succeeded in a layup shot with 4 seconds left in fourth quarter, tied the score to 90–90, forcing an overtime. Hyun then scored six points in the overtime, securing South Korea’s first Asian Games gold medal in 20 years since the 1982 Asian Games held in New Delhi.

==== Olympics ====
Hyun, who was in his second year of college, was named to the South Korean roster for the 1996 Summer Olympics in Atlanta, where he played in all seven tournament games. He was not only one of the top players of the team but also of the competition, outperforming NBA players Charles Barkley in terms of points per game, David Robinson in total points, and Scottie Pippen in field goal shooting percentage. Hyun led the team in scoring and rebounds. He averaged 16.6 points, 5.3 rebounds and 2.1 assists per game, while shooting 56.8% from the field, in addition to posting an 82.1% free throw percentage. South Korea finished in the twelfth place after they lost 61–99 against Angola in the classification round.

==== East Asian Games ====
Hyun played for the South Korean national team at the 1997 East Asian Games, hosted by his home country in Busan. South Korea lost in the gold medal game against Chinese Taipei, finishing second in the competition.

==== Asian Basketball Confederation Champions Cup ====
In 1997, Hyun, who was a college student, was once again tasked to represent South Korea in the continental games. Hyun won and gained the attention of the international audience when he shattered the backboard during the dunk competition at the All-Star Game of the 1997 ABC Champions Cup, now called FIBA Asia Champions Cup, in Jakarta. Hyun is the only one who broke the backboard in Korean basketball history.

==== Asian Basketball Confederation Championship and FIBA Asia Cup ====
Hyun was named to the roster that represented South Korea in the 1995 ABC Championship in Seoul. They won the silver medal, after losing to China in the final game with 78–87.

At the 1997 ABC Championship held in Riyadh, Hyun competed for the national squad, where they won the gold medal, after defeating Japan in the finals with 78–76.

Hyun represented South Korea in the 1999 ABC Championship in Fukuoka, where they finished runner-up, after being defeated in the gold medal game by rival team China with a score of 45–63.

Hyun last played for the South Korean squad during the 2005 FIBA Asia Championship, formerly named Asian Basketball Confederation Championship, in Doha. He played in all eight matches, averaging 8.6 points per game and recording a 61.5% free throw percentage. South Korea lost to Qatar, the tournament's host team, in the bronze-medal game, with a score of 77–89, ranking them fourth in the competition.

== Player profile ==
Standing at 6 ft 4.8 in (1.95 m) and weighing 284 lb (129 kg), Hyun played the power forward position, a specialized role which was not exhibited in Korean basketball during the 1990s. Hyun is noted to be the key person who introduced the position and made it popular.

A multi-faceted player, Hyun was known for his playmaking, ball-handling, passing and dishing skills. He was one of the league's most popular players for his flamboyant and powerful playing style. As a rookie, Hyun scored double-digits in 24 consecutive games — a feat that remains unmatched in the KBL until this day. In addition, Hyun went down the league history for being the first rookie to log a triple-double. Following his impressive season debut, he became the first rookie ever to earn an All-Star selection. In the 2004–05 season, Hyun logged the most double-double for the forward position with 13. He also came first in the forward position and second in the season’s assists averages with 7.83 per game. As a result, Hyun made it to the MVP list and he finished second in voting. For his performances over the season, he was voted into the KBL Best 5 as one of the two forwards. Despite his tough and rough impression, Hyun is loved by fans for his gentlemanly play as well as his confident yet calm demeanor. Known to be well-mannered inside the court with just five technical fouls throughout his career, Hyun earned the Exemplary Player honor in 2006. Hyun logged seven career triple-doubles, the most in the league history (along with Joo Hee-jung, his teammate at Korea University).

Being regarded as a dominant power forward in the KBL and yet undersized for the position, Hyun was dubbed "Charles Barkley" of Korea. Hyun never won a championship ring like Barkley.

Hyun played in 397 regular games over nine seasons, putting up career averages of 13.3 points, 4.1 rebounds and 5.2 assists in 30.5 minutes of action. He averaged 12.1 points, 3.5 rebounds and 2.8 assists in 24.48 minutes of action in 10 playoff games over four seasons. His recorded career scores including the playoffs were 5389 points, 1674 rebounds and 2095 assists in 407 games.

== KBL career statistics ==
Legend
G	Number of games played	FTM	Free throws made	SPG	Steals per game
MPG	Minutes per game (minutes:seconds)	OFF	Offensive rebounds	BPG	Blocks per game
PPG	Points per game	DEF	Defensive rebounds	TO	Turnovers
FGM	Field goals made	RPG	Rebounds per game	PF	Personal fouls
3PM	3-pointers made	APG	Assists per game	**Bold**	Career high

=== Regular season ===
Note: In 2001, Hyun was admitted to the army for mandatory service. He was discharged in 2003.

Season	Team	G	MPG	PPG	FGM	3P	FTM	OFF	DEF	RPG	APG	SPG	BPG	TO	PF
1998–99	Cheongju SK Knights	34	36:32	**23.9**	**8.9**	**2.1**	4.1	**1.5**	**4.9**	**6.4**	4.6	0.8	0.3	3.4	2.6
1999–00	Cheongju SK Knights	15	**38:50**	19.6	7.7	1.2	3.1	1.3	3.5	4.7	6.2	1.1	0.2	**4.1**	2.7
1999–00	Gwangju Goldbank Clickers	27	37:34	23.7	8.8	0.9	**5.1**	1.3	4.8	6.0	7.6	**1.3**	0.3	3.3	**3.4**
2000–01	Yeosu Goldbank Clickers	27	30:57	16.7	6.8	0.1	3.0	1.4	4.2	5.7	5.0	1.1	0.0	2.7	2.9
2003–04	Busan KTF Magic Wings	44	31:14	12.9	5.0	0.6	2.4	0.8	2.7	3.4	5.9	**1.3**	0.0	3.2	2.6
2004–05	Busan KTF Magic Wings	53	35:12	14.2	5.4	1.2	2.3	0.7	2.8	3.6	**7.8**	1.2	**0.4**	3.7	2.4
2005–06	Changwon LG Sakers	**54**	31:11	11.2	4.4	0.7	1.8	0.7	3.6	4.3	5.3	1.0	0.1	2.1	2.8
2006–07	Changwon LG Sakers	46	26:47	9.3	3.4	0.5	1.8	0.7	3.0	3.7	3.4	0.9	0.1	2.1	2.4
2007–08	Changwon LG Sakers	53	26:33	7.9	3.1	0.4	1.4	0.7	3.0	3.7	4.0	0.9	0.1	1.7	2.0
2008–09	Changwon LG Sakers	44	19:47	6.7	2.6	0.3	1.3	0.3	1.9	2.2	3.3	0.8	0.1	1.8	1.8
Career		397	30:30	13.3	5.1	0.8	2.4	0.9	3.3	4.1	5.2	1.0	0.2	2.7	2.5

=== Playoffs ===
Season	Team	G	MPG	PPG	FGM	3P	FTM	OFF	DEF	RPG	APG	SPG	BPG	TO	PF
2004–05	Busan KTF Magic Wings	2	**41:30**	**23.0**	**9.5**	**1.5**	2.5	**3.5**	**4.5**	**8.0**	**6.5**	**1.0**	**0.5**	**3.5**	**3.0**
2006–07	Changwon LG Sakers	**4**	21:40	12.0	4.8	0.5	2.0	0.3	2.3	2.5	2.0	0.0	0.3	2.3	2.3
2007–08	Changwon LG Sakers	2	23:09	7.5	2.0	0.0	**3.5**	1.0	2.5	3.5	2.0	**1.0**	0.0	**3.5**	1.5
2008–09	Changwon LG Sakers	2	14:26	6.0	2.0	1.0	1.0	0.5	0.5	1.0	1.5	0.0	0.0	1.5	0.5
Career		10	24:29	12.1	4.6	0.7	2.2	1.1	2.4	3.5	2.8	0.4	0.2	2.6	1.9

== Broadcasting career ==
Hyun, who retired in 2009, returned to the hardwood 5 years later, as a sports commentator for the MBC Sports Plus from 2014 to 2017.

In an interview, Hyun, who had turned down many sports broadcasting offers since his retirement, revealed that he initially said no because he felt he was not yet ready to step inside the hardwood but after he realized that if it becomes too late, he will never be able to come back to the court, which he considers his home, he finally said yes.

On September 17, 2014, 39-year-old Hyun made his debut as a basketball commentator at the 2014 KBL Draft held in the Jamsil Students' Gymnasium, which was also Hyun’s first public appearance since his retirement press conference.

In Hyun’s first year of broadcasting, he was partnered with the veteran sportscaster Han Myung-jae (한명재) for the 2014–15 KBL season coverage. Since the 2015–16 season, Hyun was paired with sports commentator Jung Yong-gum (정용검). The duo was well-received by the public for their informative and engaging discussion. Hyun’s in-depth analysis and entertaining commentary became a hit to basketball fans.

In 2017, Hyun was named Commentator of the Year by Jumpball (점프볼), the official media outlet and publication of the KBL. Hyun came in first place with 13 votes, followed by Choi Yeon-gil (최연길) with 7 and Kim Dong-gwang (김동광; 金東光) with 6. The award was decided by a 30-member panel composed of basketball writers and broadcasters.

After the announcement that Hyun will be joining the Changwon LG Sakers as their head coach, he made his last appearance as a broadcaster on April 26, 2017 when he came out as a guest commentator during the third game of the 2016–17 KBL finals between the Anyang KGC and the Seoul Samsung Thunders.

== Coaching career ==
On April 21, 2017, Hyun, who does not have prior coaching experience, was named the seventh head coach of the Changwon LG Sakers. It was a first in the KBL history that a coach was hired without any coaching experience, making Hyun the only one who went from being a player to an inexperienced head coach of the same team in the KBL. Hyun signed a 3-year contract with the Changwon LG Sakers.

In Hyun's first year of coaching, the Changwon LG Sakers ranked ninth out of the ten teams in the league with 17 wins and 37 losses in the 2017–18 season. He then took the team, who had been struggling at the bottom since 2015, to third place with 30 wins and 24 losses in the 2018–19 season. This was their first time making it to the playoffs after four years of being in the lower ranks. The team fell again to ninth place with 16 wins and 26 losses in the 2019–20 season, which ended early due to COVID-19.

On April 9, 2020, LG announced that Hyun has resigned. The Changwon LG Sakers expressed their interest in renewing Hyun's contract but the latter, whose contract expired with the end of the season, refused the extension offer.

In an episode of the KBS2 show called Boss in The Mirror which aired on May 17, 2020, Hyun expressed that he resigned from his post because he felt responsible for the team’s lackluster performance in the 2019–20 season. It was also revealed that the players found out about Hyun’s departure through the news.

== Entertainment career ==
=== 2015 – 2017: Debut, rising popularity and hiatus ===
In February 2015, Hyun, who was active as a basketball commentator, appeared as a guest on the award-winning and most-watched Korean variety show Infinite Challenge, where he got the nickname "Super Power". Hyun’s first entertainment show appearance was a smash hit, his antics, wit and humor impressed the audience, turning him into a TV sensation. Following his appearance, Hyun's name constantly appeared in Naver's real-time search.

Since then, Hyun has been constantly appearing on TV shows as a guest, a panelist and a cast member. Hyun expressed that the aim of his TV appearances is to help rekindle the public’s interest in the sport of basketball, which was overshadowed by the popularity of association football, baseball and golf.

In an interview with Korean magazine STYLER (스타일러 주부생활) in 2016, Hyun shared that he was initially hesitant when Seo Jang-hoon asked him to appear on Infinite Challenge since it was his first entertainment show appearance, but after filming, his children told him that they loved his shoot, and they were excited to see him on TV. Hearing that his sons approved of his TV appearance, Hyun became receptive to TV show offers which he did not entertain before. In another interview in the same year, when Hyun was asked what his basis was on accepting TV program offers, he answered that he only appears on shows that his two sons would like him to.

Due to Hyun’s appointment as a basketball head coach in April 2017 and his subsequent departure from sports broadcasting, he also discontinued appearing on TV shows to focus on his coaching duties. His last appearance was for One Night Food Trip in May 2017.

=== 2019: Boss in The Mirror and hiatus ===
In April 2019, Hyun joined KBS2’s new variety show, Boss in The Mirror as a cast member, ending his 23-month break from television activities. The players and staff of Hyun's team, the Changwon LG Sakers, made an appearance in the show. Due to their TV stint, players Kim Si-rae (김시래; 金時來), Kang Byung-hyun (강병현; 姜秉賢), Jeong Hee-jae (정희재), Kim Dong-ryang (김동량) and Park Byung-woo (박병우) became well-known figures in the basketball world as well as the team's general manager Park Do-kyung (박도경; 朴塗景) and translator Chae Seong-woo (채성우). The Changwon LG Sakers also became one of the most popular teams in the league.

With Hyun's television activities, he helped in boosting the image of the KBL, especially since the league and its players and coaches had been in the negative spotlight after a series of scandals involving illegal betting, match-fixing and drunk driving from the late 2000s to early 2010s. In the past, the conservative domestic sports world had largely been resistant to athletes appearing on television programs. Alongside Seo and their former national teammate Hur Jae, Hyun's appearances on television have drawn more attention towards basketball, which had seen a sharp decline in popularity since the 1990s, back when the trio were in their prime.

To devote more time and have an undivided attention in coaching the Changwon LG Sakers, Hyun did not appear in Boss in The Mirror for the whole duration of the 2019–20 KBL season. He made his last appearance on the show in October 2019.

At the 17th KBS Entertainment Awards, Hyun was nominated for the Top Excellence Award in Entertainment Category for his work in Boss in The Mirror.

=== 2020 – present: Return ===
Following his resignation as a head coach of the Changwon LG Sakers, Hyun returned as a cast member of Boss in The Mirror in May 2020 after 6 months of being off-air. Hyun became active again in the entertainment industry, appearing in numerous shows.

On September 2, 2020, KBS announced that Hyun will be hosting the third season of TV Loaded with Love, a TV program that has been running since 1994, together with veteran TV presenter Kim Won-hee. This was Hyun’s first hosting gig since he entered show business.

On December 24, 2020, during the 18th KBS Entertainment Awards, Hyun won his first entertainment award, receiving the Top Excellence Award in Reality Category, for his work in Boss in The Mirror.

On February 1, 2021, Hyun launched his YouTube channel mukboss Mr.JooYup (먹보스 쭈엽이). In two weeks, he reached 193,000 subscribers. He signed with multi-channel network agency MCCOI for content production.

== Personal life ==
=== Marriage and family ===
Hyun met his wife, pastry chef Park Sang-hyun (박상현), through an acquaintance in November 2006. After 5 months of dating, Hyun proposed. The two got married at Hotel Shilla on June 21, 2007. The couple have two sons, Hyun Joon-hee (현준희; born 2008) and Hyun Joon-wook (현준욱; born 2009).

In two interviews, Hyun shared that even until his thirties, he would still kiss and sleep next to his father, who died when he was 33. Similar to his dad, Hyun also expresses physical affection towards his two sons which his children also like. Hyun is known as a family man and an affectionate dad.

=== Fraud victim ===
After retiring, Hyun was scammed by an acquaintance and lost ₩1.7 billion KRW. In 2012, Hyun filed a lawsuit and won, but was only able to recover half of the money amounting to ₩870 million KRW.

=== Philanthropy ===
On March 6, 2023, Hyun donated ₩100 million KRW to his alma mater.

== Filmography ==
=== Television shows ===
Year	Title	Note
2015	Chok Chok Oppa (촉촉한 오빠들)	Cast Member
2015	Law of the Jungle in Nicaragua (정글의 법칙)	Nicaragua Episode 178 – 185, Cast Member
2015 – 2017	The Lord of Thumbs (엄지의 제왕)	Panel
2015 – 2016	The Greatest Expectation (위대한 유산)	Panel Hyun Joon-wook and Hyun Joon-hee are part of the cast members
2015 – 2016	Farm Hands (부르면 갑니다, 머슴아들)	Cast Member
2015 – 2016	A Man Who Feeds The Dog (개밥 주는 남자)	Episode 1 – 15, Cast Member
2016	Battle Trip (배틀 트립)	Hong Kong Movie Tour vs Slam Dunk Tour Episode 5, Contestant
2016	Law of the Jungle in New Caledonia (정글의 법칙)	New Caledonia Episode 225 – 228, Guest
2016	Rebound	Cast Member
2017	Buzzer Beater (버저비터)	Cast Member
2017	True Meals Show (트루밥쇼)	Cast Member
2019 – present	Boss in The Mirror (사장님 귀는 당나귀 귀)	Episodes 1 – 27, Cast Member
2019 – present	Boss in The Mirror (사장님 귀는 당나귀 귀)	Episode 55 – present, Cast Member
2020	Giant Veteran (위대한 배태랑)	Cast Member
2020 – 2021	TV Loaded with Love Season 3 (TV는 사랑을 싣고)	Episode 1 – present, Main Host
2021	Are You Hungry for Delivery? Just Order It! (배달고파? 일단시켜!)	Cast Member
2021	Let's Play Basketball (뭉쳐야 쏜다)	Episode 1 – 31 Cast Member
2021	National Bang Bang Cook Cook (전국방방쿡쿡)	Cast Member
2021	Wild Cave (동굴캐슬)	Cast Member
2022	Legend Festival (전설체전)	Participant
2022	Jump Like a Witch (마녀체력 농구부)	Director
2022	Capitalism School (자본주의 학교)	Cast
2022	Hole-in-One (전설끼리 홀인원)	Cast Member
2022	Running Full Course (달리는 풀코스)	Cast Member; pilot program
2023	World's First Merchant (천하제일장사2)	Contestant; Season 2

== Career achievements ==
Cited above, unless noted otherwise.

=== KBL ===
- Most consecutive double-digit scoring as a rookie (24 games).
- First rookie to record a triple-double in league history.
- First rookie to earn an All-Star selection in league history.
- Most double-doubles by a forward during the 2004–05 regular season (13 games).
- Most assists by a forward and second most assists during the 2004–05 regular season (total of 415 assists, 7.83 assists per game).
- Most career triple-doubles (7 games).

=== South Korea national team ===
- 1997 FIBA Under-21 World Championship: Top scorer (total of 126 points, 18.0 points per game).
- 1997 FIBA Under-21 World Championship: Most points in a game (32 points against Australia on August 3, 1997).

==== Medals ====
- 1992 ABC Under-18 Championship: Silver
- 1994 Asian Games: Silver
- 1995 ABC Championship: Silver
- 1997 East Asian Games: Silver
- 1997 ABC Championship: Gold
- 1998 Asian Games: Silver
- 1999 ABC Championship: Silver
- 2002 Asian Games: Gold

== Awards and honors ==
Cited above, unless noted otherwise.

=== Player ===
==== KBL ====
- KBL 20th Anniversary All-Time Legend 12 (2017)
- KBL 15th Anniversary Legend All-Star (2012)
- 6-time KBL All-Star (1999, 2000, 2004, 2005, 2006, 2008)
- KBL Exemplary Player (2006)
- 2-time KBL-CBA All-Star (2005, 2006)
- KBL Forward of the Year (2005)
- All-KBL First Team (2005)
- KBL Best 5 (2005)
- 2-time KBL All-Star Best 5 (2000, 2005)
- 2-time KBL Player of the Month (January 2000, November 2004)

==== Basketball Festival ====
- Basketball Festival Finals MVP (2002)
- Basketball Festival Rebound Award (2002)

==== South Korea national team ====
- ABC Champions Cup Dunk Contest Winner (1997)

=== Broadcaster ===
- Jumpball (점프볼) Commentator of the Year (2017)

=== Coach ===
- KBL Regular Season Third Place (2018–19)

=== Entertainer ===
Year	Award ceremony	Category	Nominated work	Result
2019	17th KBS Entertainment Awards	Top Excellence Award in Entertainment Category	Boss in the Mirror	Nominated
2020	18th KBS Entertainment Awards	Top Excellence Award in Reality Category	Boss in the Mirror	Won
