= Seo Jang-hoon =

South Korean basketball player (born 1974)

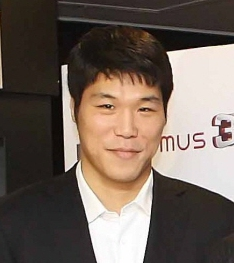
- Seo in 2011
- Born: June 3, 1974 (age 52); Seoul, South Korea
- Occupations: Basketball player; TV entertainer
- Years active: 1998 - present
- Agent: SM C&C
- Spouse: Oh Jeong-yeon (m. 2009; div. 2013)
- Awards: 2018 54th Baeksang Arts Awards for Male - Best Variety Performer
- Basketball career

Personal information
- Listed height: 207 cm (6 ft 9 in)
- Listed weight: 116 kg (256 lb)

Career information
- High school: Whimoon High School
- College: Yonsei University
- Playing career: 1998–2013
- Position: Center
- Number: 11 and 7

Career history
- 1998 – 2002: Cheongju / Seoul SK Knights
- 2002 – 2007: Seoul Samsung Thunders
- 2007 – 2008: Jeonju KCC Egis
- 2008–2011: Incheon Electroland Elephants
- 2011 – 2012: Changwon LG Sakers
- 2012 – 2013: Busan KT Sonicboom

Career highlights
- 2× KBL Championship (2000, 2006); 2× KBL Most Valuable Player Award (2000, 2006); KBL Playoffs Most Valuable Player Award (2000); KBL All-Star MVP (2006); 8× KBL Best 5 (1999, 2000, 2002–2006, 2008); KBL All-Time Legend 12; KBL rebounds leader – overall (1999); KBL points leader – domestic players (1999)
Medals
Representing Republic of Korea
Basketball
Asian Games
Gold medal – first place	2002 Busan	South Korea
Silver medal – second place	1994 Hiroshima	South Korea
Silver medal – second place	1998 Bangkok	South Korea
FIBA Asia Cup
Gold medal – first place	1997 ABC Championship	South Korea
Bronze medal – third place	1993 ABC Championship	South Korea
East Asian Games
Silver medal – second place	1997 East Asian Games	South Korea

Korean name
- Hangul: 서장훈
- Hanja: 徐章勳
- RR: Seo Janghun
- MR: Sŏ Changhun

Seo Jang-hoon (Korean: 서장훈; born 3 June 1974) is a South Korean former professional basketball player, who is currently active as an entertainer and variety show star.

== Early life ==
Seo attended Whimoon High School, known as one Seoul's high school basketball powerhouses, alongside close friend Hyun Joo-yup. Their team drew attention as they measured an average height of 1.97 meters, around the height of their adult counterparts, despite being only teenagers.

== Basketball career ==
Seo played college basketball for Yonsei University. His time at Yonsei coincided with what is often retrospectively dubbed the "golden era" of domestic college basketball and was referenced in the television series Reply 1994. He and his teammates, as well as their counterparts from traditional athletic rivals Korea University, enjoyed a level of popularity similar to that of idol singers and A-list actors/actresses due to their skills and good looks. Together with his future national teammates Yonsei counterparts Lee Sang-min, Moon Kyung-eun and Woo Ji-won and Korea University's Hyun Joo-yup, Chun Hee-chul and Shin Ki-sung among others, they were collectively dubbed "Oppa Troupe" (오빠부대) by the media.

By the end of Seo's college career, domestic basketball was transitioning into the professional era with the establishment of the Korean Basketball League. He was signed by Seoul SK Knights, then based in Cheongju, in 1998. That year he moved to Seoul Samsung Thunders and played for them until 2007. From 2007 to 2008, he played for Jeonju KCC Egis. In 2008 Seo went to Incheon Electroland Elephants, and played for them until his retirement in 2013.

In 1994, Seo was first called-up to the South Korean senior national team and played in the 1994 FIBA world cup. His team competed in the 1994 Asian Games and got second place. In 1997, his team played in the ABC World Basketball Tournament and won. 1998, He played in 1998 FIBA world cup. He was a mainstay of the team which won gold at the 2002 Asian Games. He took 4th place in 2005 FIBA Asian cup, and 5th place at the 2006 Asian Games.

In his prime, Seo was widely regarded as one of the greatest centers of his generation and was dubbed "National Treasure Center" (국보급 센터) by fans and the media. A formidable rebounder and scorer, he held the league all-time record for rebounds (5235 in 688 games) until January 2022, when it was surpassed by Jeonju KCC Egis center-forward Ra Gun-ah. During the 1998–99 season, he led the league in rebounds (overall among both domestic and foreign players) and points (among domestic players); no other domestic player has simultaneously led the league in both a domestic and overall statistical category in a single season, until point guard Heo Hoon over two decades later.

=== Career statistics ===
Basketball statistics (1998-2013)

Season	G	Min.	2P	2PA	%	3P	3PA	%	FG	FT	FTA	%	OFF	DEF	REB	AST	w/FT	w/oFT	STL	BLK	GD	TO	PTS	TEAM
2012–13	41	984:26	132	261	50.57	35	91	38.46	47.44	54	69	78.26	35	111	146	21	36	44	6	16	1	47	423	Busan KT
2011–12	35	745:50	83	193	43.01	18	62	29.03	39.61	43	59	72.88	25	78	103	28	24	20	11	3	2	50	263	Changwon LG
2010–11	54	1582:39	320	598	53.51	31	85	36.47	51.39	166	212	78.30	72	228	300	54	47	65	19	18	3	110	899	Incheon ET Land
2009–10	54	1702:14	343	624	54.97	21	75	28.00	52.07	175	224	78.13	79	279	358	88	63	57	21	15	3	141	924	Incheon ET Land
2008–09	51	1536:18	238	460	51.74	55	133	41.35	49.41	178	227	78.41	60	214	274	82	70	65	19	24	4	102	819	KCC Egis
2007–08	54	1662:8	311	595	52.27	26	99	26.26	48.56	179	216	82.87	101	295	396	92	67	56	18	25	2	109	879	KCC Egis
2006–07	33	1036:17	158	289	54.67	40	98	40.82	51.16	101	135	74.81	33	122	155	70	33	37	14	5	1	96	537	Seoul Samsung
2005–06	54	1861:4	329	605	54.38	77	200	38.50	50.43	173	216	80.09	85	229	314	109	69	71	35	22	3	121	1062	Seoul Samsung
2004–05	54	1951:23	464	857	54.14	34	83	40.96	52.98	162	207	78.26	114	395	509	72	79	78	24	43	3	144	1192	Seoul Samsung
2003–04	47	1665:22	392	753	52.06	25	64	39.06	51.04	179	231	77.49	92	312	404	89	74	39	41	42	8	99	1038	Seoul Samsung
2002–03	54	2076:19	530	1015	52.22	11	52	21.15	50.70	190	265	71.70	121	472	593	105	60	55	33	55	4	147	1283	Seoul Samsung
2001–02	54	2121:52	547	1040	52.60	26	65	40.00	51.86	194	281	69.04	104	436	540	90	75	52	38	80	8	165	1366	Seoul SK Knights
2000–01	24	882:14	240	446	53.81	12	36	33.33	52.28	74	107	69.16	43	173	216	33	37	24	19	27	20	57	590	Cheongju SK Knights
1999–00	45	1732:34	417	737	56.58	18	43	41.86	55.77	203	250	81.20	95	357	452	67	88	45	37	35	0	93	1091	Cheongju SK Knights
1998–99	34	1298:51	343	532	64.47	9	30	30.00	62.63	152	190	80.00	118	357	475	77	55	44	21	53	0	139	865	Cheongju SK Knights
Career	688	22839:19	4847	9005	53.83	438	1216	36.02	51.71	2223	2889	76.95	1177	4058	5235	1077	877	752	356	463	62	1620	13231	

=== Career averages ===
Seo Jang Hoon's Averages (1998-2013)

Season	G	MPG	PPG	RPG	APG	TPG	SPG	BPG	PF	2P	2PA	%	3P	3PA	%	FG	FT	FTA	%	OPG	DPG	GPG	TEAM
2012–13	41	24:1	10.32	3.56	0.51	1.15	0.15	0.39	1.95	3.22	6.37	50.57	0.85	2.22	38.46	47.44	1.32	1.68	78.26	0.85	2.71	0.02	Busan KT
2011–12	35	21:1	7.51	2.94	0.80	1.43	0.31	0.09	1.26	2.37	5.51	43.01	0.51	1.77	29.03	39.61	1.23	1.69	72.88	0.71	2.23	0.06	Changwon LG
2010–11	54	29:1	16.65	5.56	1.00	2.04	0.35	0.33	2.07	5.93	11.07	53.51	0.57	1.57	36.47	51.39	3.07	3.93	78.30	1.33	4.22	0.06	Incheon ET Land
2009–10	54	32:0	17.11	6.63	1.63	2.61	0.39	0.28	2.22	6.35	11.56	54.97	0.39	1.39	28.00	52.07	3.24	4.15	78.13	1.46	5.17	0.06	Incheon ET Land
2008–09	51	30:0	16.06	5.37	1.61	2.00	0.37	0.47	2.65	4.67	9.02	51.74	1.08	2.61	41.35	49.41	3.49	4.45	78.41	1.18	4.20	0.08	KCC Egis
2007–08	54	31:0	16.28	7.33	1.70	2.02	0.33	0.46	2.28	5.76	11.02	52.27	0.48	1.83	26.26	48.56	3.31	4.00	82.87	1.87	5.46	0.04	KCC Egis
2006–07	33	31:1	16.27	4.70	2.12	2.91	0.42	0.15	2.12	4.79	8.76	54.67	1.21	2.97	40.82	51.16	3.06	4.09	74.81	1.00	3.70	0.03	Seoul Samsung
2005–06	54	34:0	19.67	5.81	2.02	2.24	0.65	0.41	2.59	6.09	11.20	54.38	1.43	3.70	38.50	50.43	3.20	4.00	80.09	1.57	4.24	0.06	Seoul Samsung
2004–05	54	36:0	22.07	9.43	1.33	2.67	0.44	0.80	2.91	8.59	15.87	54.14	0.63	1.54	40.96	52.98	3.00	3.83	78.26	2.11	7.31	0.06	Seoul Samsung
2003–04	47	35:0	22.09	8.60	1.89	2.11	0.87	0.89	2.40	8.34	16.02	52.06	0.53	1.36	39.06	51.04	3.81	4.91	77.49	1.96	6.64	0.17	Seoul Samsung
2002–03	54	38:0	23.76	10.98	1.94	2.72	0.61	1.02	2.13	9.81	18.80	52.22	0.20	0.96	21.15	50.70	3.52	4.91	71.70	2.24	8.74	0.07	Seoul Samsung
2001–02	54	39:1	25.30	10.00	1.67	3.06	0.70	1.48	2.35	10.13	19.26	52.60	0.48	1.20	40.00	51.86	3.59	5.20	69.04	1.93	8.07	0.15	Seoul SK Knights
2000–01	24	37:1	24.58	9.00	1.38	2.38	0.79	1.13	2.54	10.00	18.58	53.81	0.50	1.50	33.33	52.28	3.08	4.46	69.16	1.79	7.21	0.83	Cheongju SK Knights
1999–00	45	38:1	24.24	10.04	1.49	2.07	0.82	0.78	2.96	9.27	16.38	56.58	0.40	0.96	41.86	55.77	4.51	5.56	81.20	2.11	7.93	0.00	Cheongju SK Knights
1998–99	34	38:2	25.44	13.97	2.26	4.09	0.62	1.56	2.91	10.09	15.65	64.47	0.26	0.88	30.00	62.63	4.47	5.59	80.00	3.47	10.50	0.00	Cheongju SK Knights
Career average	45.87	33.2	19.23	7.61	1.57	2.35	0.52	0.67	2.37	7.05	13.09	53.83	0.64	1.77	36.02	0.08	3.23	4.2	76.95	1.71	5.9	0.09	

== Entertainment career ==
After he retired from basketball, Seo began a career appearing on entertainment shows and was signed to Mystic Entertainment in 2013. In 2015, he was a guest on the critically and commercially popular variety show Infinite Challenge. He won the 2015 SBS Entertainment Award for Rookie of the Year for his appearance in Flaming Youth.

He is a regular celebrity panelist on the singing competition show Fantastic Duo, which debuted on April 17, 2016. He is also a regular panelist on the talk show Same Bed, Different Dreams, and a permanent cast member of JTBC's Knowing Bros.

== Personal life ==
On June 23, 2009, Seo married Oh Jeong-yeon, a television announcer. They divorced in 2012, after 3 years of marriage.

In July 2026, it was reported that Seo had listed a five-story building he owns near Yangjae Station in Seoul's Seocho District for sale at 45 billion won. He originally purchased the building for 2.817 billion won in 2000. Seo is regarded as one of the wealthiest entertainers in South Korea in terms of real estate holdings, owning at least two other buildings in Seoul.

== Filmography ==
=== TV shows ===
Off-Air On-Air

Year	Title	Role
2014	Four Sons and One Daughter	Cast member
2014–2015	Quiz to Change the World	Host
2015	Animals	Cast member
2015	The Brave Teenagers	Cast member
2015	Yaman TV	Main Host
2015–2016	Same Bed, Different Dreams	Main Host
2015–present	Knowing Bros	Regular Member
2016	Candy In My Ear	Regular Member
2016	Hello Friends	Main Host
2016	Fantastic Duo	Panelist
2016–2017	Flower Crew	Main Role
2016–present	My Little Old Boy	Main Host
2017	The Dynamic Duo	Regular Member
2017	Elucidating Science	Host
2017	The New Product Checkers	Host
2017	Strange Restaurant	Host
2017	Shoulders of Giants	Host
2017–2018	Cart Show	Main Host
2017–2018	The Swan Club	Main Host
2017–present	Same Bed, Different Dreams 2: You Are My Destiny	Main Host
2018	Temperature of Judgement	Host
2018	Food Diary	Regular Member
2018	Go Here	Host
2018	Reckless but Happy	Host
2018	Supermodel 2018 Survival	Host
2018–2019	Favorable Night For You - Opening At Night	Main Host
2018–2019	Love Naggers 2	Main Host
2019	Trio's Childcare Challenge	Regular Member
2019–2020	Five Cranky Brothers	Main Host
2019–2020	Broadcasting on Your Side	Main Host
2019–present	Ask Us Anything Fortune Teller	Main Host
2020	Handsome Tigers	Team Coach
2020	Travelling Market	Host
2020	Red-Cheeked Ramyun Lab	Cast
2020	2020 Home Star Wars	Host
2020–present	Love Naggers 3	Main Host
2021	Crazy Recipe Adventure	Main Host
2021	Cooking - The Birth of King Lee	Main Host
2022	Part 1 Special Song	Host
2022	Full Filer	Cast Member
2022	Young Boss Who Makes Money	Host
2022	Sports Golden Bell	Host; Chuseok Special
2023	Myeongdong Love Room	Manager

== Accolades ==
=== Awards and nominations ===
Year presented, name of the award ceremony, award category, nominated work and the result of the nomination
Year	Award	Category	Nominated work	Result	Ref.
2016	10th SBS Entertainment Awards	Excellence Award in Variety Show	Flower Crew, My Little Old Boy	Won	
2016	10th SBS Entertainment Awards	Best Friends Award (with Flower Crew team)	Flower Crew	Won	
2017	11th SBS Entertainment Awards	Excellence Award in Show/Talk Category	My Little Old Boy	Nominated	
2017	11th SBS Entertainment Awards	Top Excellence Award in Show/Talk Category	My Little Old Boy, Same Bed, Different Dreams 2	Won	
2018	54th Baeksang Arts Awards	Best Variety Performer - Male	Knowing Bros, Same Bed, Different Dreams 2	Won	
2019	17th KBS Entertainment Awards	Best Couple Award (with Lee Soo-geun)	Ask Us Anything Fortune Teller	Nominated	
2019	13th SBS Entertainment Awards	Grand Prize (Daesang)	My Little Old Boy, Same Bed, Different Dreams 2	Nominated	
2019	19th MBC Entertainment Awards	Popularity Award	Broadcasting on Your Side	Won	
2019	19th MBC Entertainment Awards	Best Couple Award (with Boom)	Broadcasting on Your Side	Nominated	
2020	14th SBS Entertainment Awards	Grand Prize (Daesang)	My Little Old Boy, Handsome Tigers, Same Bed, Different Dreams 2	Nominated	
2020	14th SBS Entertainment Awards	Special Award: Lifetime Achievement Award	My Little Old Boy, Handsome Tigers, Same Bed, Different Dreams 2	Won	
2021	15th SBS Entertainment Awards	Grand Prize (Daesang) with My Little Old Boy team (Shin Dong-yup, Cho Hye-seon, Kim Sun-ja, Park Young-hye, Lee Sang-min, Tak Jae-hoon, Im Won-hee, Kim Joon-ho, Kim Jong-kook, Kim Hee-chul, Lee Tae-sung, Oh Min-suk, Park Goon, Choi Jin-hyuk)	My Little Old Boy	Won	
2021	15th SBS Entertainment Awards	Entertainer of the Year Award	My Little Old Boy, Same Bed, Different Dreams 2: You Are My Destiny	Won	

=== Listicles ===
Name of publisher, year listed, name of listicle, and placement
Publisher	Year	Listicle	Placement	Ref.
Forbes	2020	Korea Power Celebrity	13th	
