= 1998 Korean Basketball League draft =

1998 KBL draft

General information
- Sport: Basketball
- Date: March 9, 1998
- Location: Hilton Hotel, Seoul

Overview
- League: KBL
- First selection: Hyun Joo-yup (Cheongju SK Knights)

The 1998 Korean Basketball League rookie draft (Korean: 1998 KBL 국내신인선수 드래프트) was held on March 9, 1998, at Hilton Hotel's convention center in Seoul, South Korea. It was the first ever rookie draft since domestic basketball transitioned into the professional era and the Korean Basketball League was established in 1997.

== Draft selections ==
This table only shows the first twenty picks.

G	Guard
F	Forward
C	Center

Denotes players who have won a KBL-sanctioned award at its annual awards ceremony (Note: One or more of the following awards: Regular season MVP; Playoffs MVP; Rookie of the Year; Best 5; Defensive Player of the Year; Defensive Best 5; Sixth Man Award; Most Improved Player; Fair Play Award)

Round	Pick	Player	Position	Team	School/club team (Note: All participants are fourth-year students (college seniors) unless otherwise stated.)
1	1	Hyun Joo-yup	F	Cheongju SK Knights	Korea University
1	2	Yoon Young-pil	F	Anyang SBS Stars	Kyung Hee University
1	3	Kim Taek-hoon	F	Suwon Samsung Thunders	Yonsei University
1	4	Byun Chung-woon	F	Gwangju Nasan Flamans	Konkuk University
1	5	Lee Eun-ho	C	Daewoo Securities Zeus	Chung-Ang University
1	6	Park Jae-il	F	Daegu Tongyang Orions	Myongji University
1	7	Shin Ki-sung	G	Wonju Naray Blue Bird	Korea University
1	8	Pyo Myung-il	G	Busan Kia Enterprise	Myongji University
1	9	Koo Byung-doo	G	Gyeongnam LG Sakers	Chung-Ang University
1	10	Ku Bon-keun	C	Daejeon Hyundai Dynat	Yonsei University
2	11	Park Young-jin	G	Daejeon Hyundai Dynat	Konkuk University
2	12	Choi Sung-woo	F	Gyeongnam LG Sakers	Hanyang University
2	13	Hwang Moon-yong	F	Busan Kia Enterprise	Konkuk University
2	14	Shin Jong-seok	F	Wonju Naray Blue Bird	Chung-Ang University
2	15	Jung Rak-young	G	Daegu Tongyang Orions	Hanyang University

== Players ==
For a league known for producing top-notch guards, the first four overall picks were forwards, with Shin Ki-sung before the highest-ranked guard at 7th. Shin, now a SPOTV commentator, would go on to forge a successful career spanning fourteen years. Other than Hyun, the other players picked before him failed to establish themselves and had brief playing careers, leading to Shin being described as the "biggest steal" of the draft.

Pyo Myung-il, also a guard and the 8th overall pick, went on to win the Sixth Man Award and Skill Development Award. He died on January 12, 2022, days before the KBL All-Star Game was scheduled to take place and was honored with a minute's silence prior to the game.

== See also ==
- Korean Basketball League draft
