= Charles Minlend =

Cameroonian-Canadian basketball player

Personal information
- Born: May 15, 1973 (age 53) Yaoundé, Cameroon
- Listed height: 6 ft 6 in (1.98 m)
- Listed weight: 215 lb (98 kg)

Career information
- High school: St. Thomas More (Oakdale, Connecticut)
- College: St. John's (1992–1997)
- NBA draft: 1997: undrafted
- Playing career: 1997–2008
- Position: Forward

Career history
- 1998: Poissy-Chatou
- 1998–1999: ASVEL Basket
- 1999–2000: Montpellier Paillade
- 2000–2003: Maccabi Givat Shmuel
- 2003–2006: Jeonju KCC Egis
- 2006–2007: Changwon LG Sakers
- 2007–2008: Cherkaski Mavpy

Career highlights
- KBL champion (2004); KBL top scorer (2004); 3× KBL All-Star (2004–2006); Israeli Basketball Premier League MVP (2003); Israeli Premier League top scorer (2003); 2× Israeli Basketball Premier League Quintet (2002–2003)

Charles Arnaud Minlend (born May 15, 1973) is a Cameroonian-Canadian former professional basketball player. A 6-foot-6 forward, he played his four years of college basketball at St. John's over 5 seasons (he redshirted one year). After going undrafted in the 1997 NBA draft he started his professional career in France where he played in the LNB Pro B with Poissy-Chatou and then moved to the LNB Pro A where he spent two seasons. He then played three seasons in Israel with Maccabi Givat Shmuel, and was named the 2003 Israeli Basketball Premier League MVP after being the top scorer in 2003 (25.3 points per game). After leaving Israel he moved to South Korea, where he played four seasons and won another scoring title in 2004. He retired in 2008 after playing one season in Ukraine.

== Early life ==
After having lived in West Germany and Canada in his early years, he spent his senior year of high school at St. Thomas More School in Oakdale, Connecticut, United States, where he averaged 24 points and 14 rebounds per game.

== College career ==
Minlend received interest from Boston College, Richmond and UConn, but decided to sign for St. John's, which had been recruiting him since December 1991. While at St. John's he opted to major in pharmacy. Minlend played 30 games during his freshman year with the Redmen under newly appointed coach Brian Mahoney, averaging 7.8 points, 3.9 rebounds and 0.7 assists per game: he ranked fifth on the team in scoring, fourth in rebounding and third in blocks per game with 0.4. He also participated in the 1993 NCAA tournament, playing in both St. John's games: he recorded 6 points and 5 rebounds against Texas Tech and 8 points and 4 rebounds against Arkansas. Minlend's sophomore season saw him getting a more prominent role in the team, and he ranked second on the team in scoring with 13.6 points per game and rebounding (7.8), trailing senior center Shawnelle Scott in both categories. His 393 points and 225 total rebounds for the season were team highs.

For his junior year, the Cameroonian-born forward was named team captain together with Derek Brown and again led the team in rebounding with 8.5 per game; he ranked third in scoring behind freshman guard Felipe López and senior forward James Scott. Minlend missed the 1995–96 season on a medical redshirt because of a hamstring injury. For his senior season in 1996–97, Minlend was named the only team captain under the new coach Fran Fraschilla. He ranked third in scoring (14.1 points per game) and second in rebounding behind junior center Zendon Hamilton; he led the team in total three-point field goals scored with 31, and also had the team's best 3-point shooting percentage at 35.2%.

He ended his career at St. Johns with 1,349 total points (tied 22nd all-time as of 2018) and 784 total rebounds (10th all-time); he also graduated with honors.

== Professional career ==
After graduating from St. John's, Minlend was automatically eligible for the 1997 NBA draft, where he went undrafted; he was selected by the Long Island Surf in the 1997 USBL draft. Minlend then moved to Europe and played for Poissy-Chatou in the LNB Pro B, the second tier of French basketball, for the first part of the 1998–1999 season. He then joined ASVEL Basket in the LNB Pro A, the top league in France, and in 6 games played he averaged 9.3 points, 3.3 rebounds and 0.2 assists in 15.2 minutes per game. He signed for Montpellier Paillade Basket for the 1999–2000 season, and in 25 games he averaged 19.6 points, 6.8 rebounds and 2 assists in 37.1 minutes of playing time.

In 2000 he left France for Israel, and signed for Maccabi Givat Shmuel in the top level of Israeli basketball. In 26 games he averaged 23.2 points, 7.5 rebounds, and 1.2 steals per game while shooting 42.5% from the field (61% on 2-pointers, and 24% on 3-pointers). The following season he played 36 minutes per game and averaged 22.6 points, 8.4 rebounds and 2.4 assists per game: he was selected in the Israeli Basketball Premier League Quintet for the first time. Minlend's 2002–03 season saw him lead the Israeli league in scoring with 25.3 points per game, shooting 36% from three; he also averaged 7.8 rebounds and 3 assists per game with a PIR of 30.1. At the end of the season he was also named league MVP and was named in the League Quinted for the second consecutive year. Minlend also reached the playoffs for the first time, and in 2 postseason games he posted averages of 25.5 points and 7 rebounds per game.

In 2003 Minlend left Israel and moved to South Korea, signing for Jeonju KCC Egis. In his first season in the Korean Basketball League he led the league in scoring with 27.1 points per game, and also added 11.3 rebounds and 2.2 assists per game, gaining an All-Star selection. In the following season he averaged 26.3 points and 11.5 rebounds per game, and was again named in the All-Star team. In his final season with KCC he played 53 games, averaging 28.6 points (a career-high) and 9.8 rebounds per game, obtaining his third All-Star selection. In 2006 he left KCC for Changwon LG Sakers, another KBL team, and in 35.4 minutes per game he averaged 28.6 points and 8.8 rebounds.

Minlend retired in 2008 after having played 4 games with the Cherkaski Mavpy in the Ukrainian Basketball SuperLeague.

== Career statistics ==
Legend
GP	Games played	MPG	Minutes per game	FG%	Field goal percentage
3P%	3-point field goal percentage	FT%	Free throw percentage	RPG	Rebounds per game
APG	Assists per game	SPG	Steals per game	BPG	Blocks per game
PPG	Points per game	**Bold**	Career high		Led the league

=== Domestic leagues ===
Year	Team	League	GP	MPG	FG%	3P%	FT%	RPG	APG	SPG	BPG	PPG
1998–99	(France) ASVEL Basket	LNB Pro A	6	15.2	**.553**	.356	.600	3.3	0.2	0.5	0.0	9.3
1999–00	(France) Montpellier Paillade	LNB Pro A	25	**37.1**	.470	.350	.614	6.8	2.0	1.2	0.1	19.6
2000–01	(Israel) Maccabi Givat Shmuel	Ligat HaAl	26		.428	.244	.753	7.5	1.2	1.0		23.2
2001–02	(Israel) Maccabi Givat Shmuel	Ligat HaAl	27	36.0	.446	.306	.743	8.4	2.4	1.0		22.6
2002–03	(Israel) Maccabi Givat Shmuel	Ligat HaAl	27	36.2	.478	.364	.776	7.8	**3.0**	1.5	0.5	25.3
2003–04	(South Korea) Jeonju KCC Egis	KBL	54	35.1	.551	.346	**.793**	11.3	2.2	1.6	0.6	27.1
2004–05	(South Korea) Jeonju KCC Egis	KBL	52	36.4	.532	.306	.654	**11.5**	2.9	1.8	**1.1**	26.3
2005–06	(South Korea) Jeonju KCC Egis	KBL	52	35.3	.518	**.399**	.755	9.8	2.9	1.6	0.8	**28.6**
2006–07	(South Korea) Changwon LG Sakers	KBL	53	35.4	.482	.375	.753	8.8	2.3	**1.9**	0.4	**28.6**
2007–08	(Ukraine) Cherkaski Mavpy	USL	4	25.0	.419	.250	.750	5.8	0.8	0.5	0.3	13.0

=== College ===
Year	Team	GP	GS	MPG	FG%	3P%	FT%	RPG	APG	SPG	BPG	PPG
1992–93	St. John's	30			**.538**	**.500**	.717	3.9	0.7	0.6	**0.4**	7.8
1993–94	St. John's	29			.500	.000	.766	7.8	0.8	1.1	0.2	13.6
1994–95	St. John's	27			.517	.143	.740	**8.5**	**1.1**	**1.2**	**0.4**	12.7
1996–97	St. John's	27			.439	.352	**.774**	7.8	**1.1**	0.9	**0.4**	**14.1**
**Career**		113			.492	.343	.752	6.9	0.9	1.0	0.3	11.9

== Personal life ==
Minlend was born in Yaoundé, Cameroon to father Joseph, an economist, and mother Anne-Marie, a secretary. He lived in West Germany for three years of his childhood and then moved to Montreal, in Canada, to live with relatives. He is married with Tracey and has three sons (Charles Jr., Jordan and James) and one daughter (Ashley): his son Charles Alexander Minlend, Jr. (b. 1997) played college basketball at the University of Louisville and also played at the University of San Francisco. Minlend's brother Raymond played college basketball at Davidson and St. Francis (NY).
