= Kang Byung-hyun =

South Korean basketball player (born 1985)

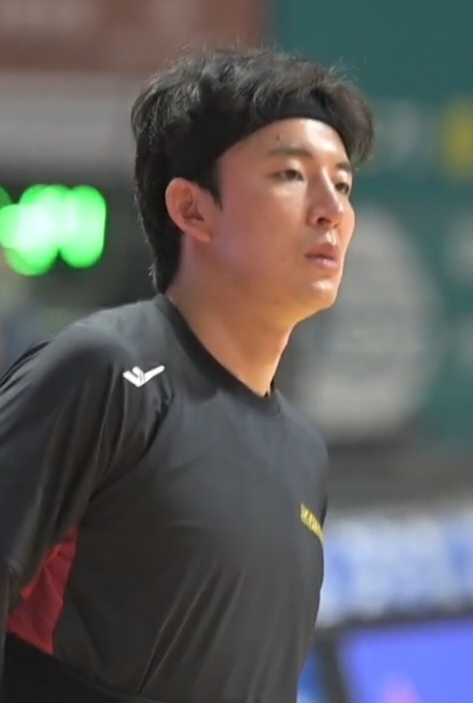
- Kang in 2021

Personal information
- Born: 3 March 1985 (age 41) Busan, South Korea
- Listed height: 194 cm (6 ft 4 in)

Career information
- High school: Jungang High School (Busan, South Korea)
- College: Chung-Ang University (2004–2008)
- KBL draft: 2008: 1st round, 4th overall pick
- Drafted by: Incheon Electroland Black Slammers
- Playing career: 2008–2022
- Position: Shooting guard / Small forward
- Coaching career: 2024–present

Career history

Playing
- 2008: Incheon Electroland Black Slammers
- 2008–2014: Jeonju KCC Egis
- 2011–2013: →Korea Armed Forces Athletic Corps
- 2014–2018: Anyang KGC
- 2018–2022: Changwon LG Sakers

Coaching
- 2024–: Changwon LG Sakers

Career highlights
- As player: 3× KBL Championships (2009, 2011, 2017); KBL Fair Play Award (2011); As a coach: KBL Championship (2025)

- Kang Byung-hyun
- Hangul: 강병현
- Hanja: 姜秉賢
- RR: Gang Byeonghyeon
- MR: Kang Pyŏnghyŏn

Kang Byung-hyun (Korean: 강병현; born 3 March 1985) is a South Korean former basketball player. A versatile swingman, he mostly played in the shooting guard or small forward positions. He retired after the 2021–22 season and has been on the coaching staff of his former team Changwon LG Sakers.

== Early life ==
Kang was first exposed to basketball due to the popularity of Slam Dunk in elementary school and began frequenting Sajik Arena to watch Busan Kia Enterprise (now Ulsan Hyundai Mobis Phoebus). He idolized franchise star Hur Jae, who influenced his decision to go to Chung-Ang University and coached him at Jeonju KCC Egis.

== Playing career ==
=== College career ===
During his freshman season at Chung-Ang University, Kang drew attention for his height, as most players at his height were preferred as centers while he mainly played at shooting guard to better utilize his scoring and ball-handling abilities. The Chung-Ang team broke Yonsei University's stranglehold on the University Basketball League title (the main collegiate competition at that time) and Kang scored 27 points in the final. He was part of the team which won the 2006 and 2007 MBC Cup, kick-starting a "Chung-Ang dynasty" that continued with the likes of Kim Sun-hyung and Oh Se-keun and eventually spanned 52 games undefeated and another three consecutive MBC Cups.

=== Professional career ===
In January 2008, Kang was drafted by Incheon Electroland Black Slammers as the fourth pick of the first round. He was traded to Jeonju KCC Egis as part of a three-player trade for star center Seo Jang-hoon. The deal made the headlines as Kang was reported to be "in shock" as he was not fully informed about the trade while Seo was allegedly "offloaded" by KCC head coach Hur Jae due to their poor working relationship, which both had since denied. He eventually established himself in Hur's team and earned a reputation as a "hidden" clutch player who was not as flashy as his counterparts but dependable during important games. During a hard-fought 2011 championship finals, Kang was crucial in KCC overturning Wonju Dongbu Promy's advantage. With both teams tied at 2-2 in the series, his last-minute three pointer to overturn Dongbu's lead in Game 5, which KCC eventually won by a narrow margin, and winning three-point shot in Game 6 with 35 seconds left on the clock sealed the Championship title for KCC.

In May 2011, he enlisted for mandatory military service and was assigned to the Korea Armed Forces Athletic Corps's Sangmu team after completing basic training. He was discharged in February 2013.

Kang was traded along with Jang Min-guk to Anyang KGC prior to the 2014–15 season as part of a deal to acquire Kim Tae-sul. He established himself as a mainstay of the team alongside the likes of Lee Jung-hyun, Park Chan-hee, Yang Hee-jong and his former Chung-Ang teammate Oh Se-keun in KGC's fourth place finish, qualifying for the playoffs after two consecutive seasons of poor results. In February 2016, he ruptured his Achilles tendon during the game against Wonju DB Promy and underwent surgery, ruling him out for the rest of the season and much of the following season. He returned to the court in March 2017 but had difficulty regaining his form during the 2017-18 season due to the after-effects of the injury.

After a dismal season, Kang was traded to Changwon LG Sakers together with Lee Won-dae in a two-for-two deal. LG's then-head coach Hyun Joo-yup drew much criticism from their own fans, who saw Kang as a player past his prime and potential liability. The ruptured Achilles tendon meant that Kang could no longer rely on his trademark bursts of speed and athleticism as a ball-handling shooting guard. Hyun instead deployed him in a "3-and-D" role to add another scoring option around the perimeter while utilizing his height in defense; Kang later credited Hyun with reviving his career through this switch in position as he had initially contemplated early retirement. In his new role, Kang established himself as a key player during the latter half of the season as LG qualified for the playoffs for the first time in four years. He was appointed team captain ahead of the 2019–20 season, renewing his contract for another two years at the end of the season.

In May 2022, LG announced that Kang would retire and join their staff as a performance analyst. He was honored with a retirement ceremony at the opening game of the 2022-23 season.

=== National team career ===
Kang's good form during the 2010-11 season and the Sangmu team earned him a spot for the 2011 FIBA Asia Championship. He scored 22 points, his best statistic for the national team, during the group stage game against India.

== Post-retirement ==
After retiring as a player, Kang remained with Changwon LG Sakers on its staff. He served as a performance analyst and scout for two seasons. Beginning in the 2024–25 season, he joined the first team coaching staff as an assistant to Cho Sang-hyun while simultaneously serving as the head coach of the reserve D League team. LG won its first ever KBL Championship that season, his first with the team.

== Personal life ==
In 2013, Kang married former Miss Korea contestant Park Ka-one after a five-year courtship. They have three sons (born in 2014, 2017 and 2026). As their first child was born while Kang was still with Anyang KGC and resided in nearby Suwon, he decided not to uproot his family when he was traded to Changwon LG Sakers, choosing to commute weekly from Suwon to Changwon.

He is close friends with fellow Busan native Kim Tae-sul, who emceed his wedding. They were schoolmates in middle school and remained friends despite going on to rival high schools and universities.
