= ABA championship =

ABA championship may refer to:

- List of ABA champions, list of championships from defunct American professional basketball league in the 1960s and 1970s
- ABA championship, league title from American Basketball Association (2000–present), an American semi-professional basketball league
- ABA Championships, boxing tournament

== See also ==
- ABA Club Championship, Asian basketball tournament
