= DB Insurance =

South Korean insurance company

DB Insurance Co., Ltd.
- Native name: 디비손해보험 주식회사
- Traded as: KRX: 005830
- Industry: Insurance
- Founded: March 1962; 64 years ago
- Headquarters: Seoul, South Korea
- Key people: Jeong Jongpyo (CEO)
- Parent: DB Group
- Website: www.idbins.com

DB Insurance Co, Ltd. (Korean: 디비손해보험 주식회사) is a non-life insurance company headquartered in Seoul, South Korea.

== History ==
Founded on January 24, 1969, by Junki Kim, the founding chairman. DB Insurance, which was launched as Korea's first public auto insurance company in 1962, became a member of Dongbu Group in 1983 and changed its name to Dongbu Insurance in October 1995. On November 1, 2017, the company changed its name to DB Insurance in order to become a global insurance finance company.

== See also ==
- Wonju DB Promy
- DB Insurance Promy Open
