= 1999–2000 KBL season =

- League: Korean Basketball League
- Sport: Basketball
- Duration: November 7, 1999 – April 2, 2000

Regular Season
- Season champions: Daejeon Hyundai Gullivers
- Season MVP: (South Korea) Seo Jang-hoon (SK)
- Top scorer: (United States) Eric Eberz (Goldbank)

Finals
- Champions: Cheongju SK Knights
- Runners-up: Daejeon Hyundai Gullivers
- Finals MVP: (South Korea) Seo Jang-hoon (SK)

KBL seasons
- ← 1998–99 2000–01 →

The 1999–2000 Anycall Professional Basketball season was the fourth season of the Korean Basketball League.

== Regular season ==
RK	Team	G	W	L	PCT	GB	Tiebreaker
1	Daejeon Hyundai Gullivers	45	33	12	0.733	–	–
2	Cheongju SK Knights	45	32	13	0.711	1	–
3	Suwon Samsung Thunders	45	23	22	0.511	10	–
4	Wonju Sambo Xers	45	22	23	0.489	11	–
5	Anyang SBS Stars	45	21	24	0.467	12	4–1
6	Busan Kia Enterprise	45	21	24	0.467	12	1–4
7	Changwon LG Sakers	45	20	25	0.444	13	4–1
8	Daegu Tongyang Orions	45	20	25	0.444	13	1–4
9	Gwangju Goldbank Clickers	45	18	27	0.400	15	–
10	Incheon Shinsegi Bigs	45	15	30	0.333	18	–

== Playoffs ==
1st Round
4	Sambo	1
5	SBS	3
3	Samsung	3
6	Kia	1

Semifinals
1	Hyundai	3
5	SBS	0
2	SK	3
3	Samsung	0

Finals
1	Hyundai	2
2	SK	4

1999–2000 KBL Champions
Cheongju SK Knights
1st title

== Prize money ==
- Cheongju SK Knights: KRW 130,000,000 (champions + regular-season 2nd place)
- Daejeon Hyundai Gullivers: KRW 100,000,000 (runners-up + regular-season 1st place)
- Suwon Samsung Thunders: KRW 20,000,000 (regular-season 3rd place)
