= DB Group =

South Korean conglomerate

- Native name: DB그룹
- Founded: 1969; 57 years ago
- Headquarters: Seoul, South Korea
- Website: www.dbgroup.co.kr

Former logo

DB Group, formerly Dongbu Group, is a conglomerate based in Seoul, South Korea. DB is engaged in insurance, financial services, and manufacturing businesses. It was established in January 1969 as Miryung Construction Company, Ltd. by Kim Jun-ki.

== Subsidiaries ==
- DB Insurance
- DB HiTek

== See also ==
- Wonju DB Promy
