= 1997 KBL season =

- League: Korean Basketball League
- Sport: Basketball
- Duration: February 1, 1997 – May 1, 1997

Regular Season
- Season champions: Busan Kia Enterprise
- Season MVP: (South Korea) Kang Dong-hee (Kia)
- Top scorer: (United States) Carl Ray Harris (Naray)

Finals
- Champions: Busan Kia Enterprise
- Runners-up: Wonju Naray Blue Bird
- Finals MVP: (South Korea) Kang Dong-hee (Kia)

KBL seasons
- ← None 1997–98 →

The FILA 1997 Professional Basketball season was the inaugural season of the Korean Basketball League.

== Regular season ==
RK	Team	G	W	L	PCT	GB	Tiebreaker
1	Busan Kia Enterprise	21	16	5	0.762	–	–
2	Anyang SBS Stars	21	14	7	0.667	2	–
3	Wonju Naray Blue Bird	21	13	8	0.619	3	–
4	Daegu Tongyang Orions	21	11	10	0.524	5	–
5	Gwangju Nasan Flamans	21	9	12	0.429	7	–
6	Incheon Daewoo Securities Zeus	21	8	13	0.381	8	–
7	Daejeon Hyundai Dynat	21	7	14	0.333	9	–
8	Suwon Samsung Thunders	21	6	15	0.286	10	–

== Playoffs ==
1st Round
4	Tongyang	4
5	Nasan	1
3	Naray	4
6	Daewoo Securities	2

Semifinals
1	Kia	4
4	Tongyang	2
2	SBS	1
3	Naray	4

Finals
1	Kia	4
3	Naray	1

1997 KBL Champions
Busan Kia Enterprise
1st title

== Prize money ==
- Busan Kia Enterprise: KRW 150,000,000 (champions + regular-season 1st place)
- Wonju Naray Blue Bird: KRW 70,000,000 (runners-up + regular-season 3rd place)
- Anyang SBS Stars: KRW 30,000,000 (regular-season 2nd place)
