= 1997–98 KBL season =

- League: Korean Basketball League
- Sport: Basketball
- Duration: November 8, 1997 – April 11, 1998

Regular Season
- Season champions: Daejeon Hyundai Dynat
- Season MVP: (South Korea) Lee Sang-min (Hyundai)
- Top scorer: (United States) Larry Davis (SBS)

Finals
- Champions: Daejeon Hyundai Dynat
- Runners-up: Busan Kia Enterprise
- Finals MVP: (South Korea) Hur Jae (Kia)

KBL seasons
- ← 1997 1998–99 →

The FILA 1997–98 Professional Basketball season was the second season of the Korean Basketball League.

== Regular season ==
RK	Team	G	W	L	PCT	GB	Tiebreaker
1	Daejeon Hyundai Dynat	45	31	14	0.689	–	–
2	Gyeongnam LG Sakers	45	28	17	0.622	3	–
3	Busan Kia Enterprise	45	26	19	0.578	5	3–2
4	Wonju Naray Blue Bird	45	26	19	0.578	5	2–3
5	Daegu Tongyang Orions	45	23	22	0.511	8	–
6	Incheon Daewoo Securities Zeus	45	22	23	0.489	9	–
7	Gwangju Nasan Flamans	45	21	24	0.467	10	–
8	Anyang SBS Stars	45	18	27	0.400	13	–
9	Suwon Samsung Thunders	45	17	28	0.378	14	–
10	Cheongju SK Knights	45	13	32	0.289	18	–

== Playoffs ==
1st Round
4	Naray	2
5	Tongyang	3
3	Kia	3
6	Daewoo Securities	1

Semifinals
1	Hyundai	3
5	Tongyang	0
2	LG	1
3	Kia	3

Finals
1	Hyundai	4
3	Kia	3

1997–1998 KBL Champions
Daejeon Hyundai Dynat
1st title

== Prize money ==
- Daejeon Hyundai Dynat: KRW 150,000,000 (champions + regular-season 1st place)
- Busan Kia Enterprise: KRW 70,000,000 (Runners-up + regular-season 3rd place)
- Gyeongnam LG Sakers: KRW 30,000,000 (regular-season 2nd place)
