= 1998–99 KBL season =

- League: Korean Basketball League
- Sport: Basketball
- Duration: November 8, 1998 – April 16, 1999

Regular Season
- Season champions: Daejeon Hyundai Dynat
- Season MVP: (South Korea) Lee Sang-min (Hyundai)
- Top scorer: (United States) Bernard Blunt (LG)

Finals
- Champions: Daejeon Hyundai Dynat
- Runners-up: Busan Kia Enterprise
- Finals MVP: (South Korea) Cho Sung-won (Hyundai)

KBL seasons
- ← 1997–98 1999–2000 →

The Hyundai Gulliver 1998–99 Professional Basketball season was the third season of the Korean Basketball League.

== Regular season ==
RK	Team	G	W	L	PCT	GB	Tiebreaker
1	Daejeon Hyundai Dynat	45	33	12	0.733	–	–
2	Busan Kia Enterprise	45	31	14	0.689	2	–
3	Incheon Daewoo Zeus	45	27	18	0.600	6	3–2
4	Wonju Naray Blue Bird	45	27	18	0.600	6	2–3
5	Changwon LG Sakers	45	25	20	0.556	8	3–2
6	Suwon Samsung Thunders	45	25	20	0.556	8	2–3
7	Anyang SBS Stars	45	22	23	0.489	11	–
8	Cheongju SK Knights	45	19	26	0.422	14	–
9	Gwangju Nasan Flamans	45	13	32	0.289	20	–
10	Daegu Tongyang Orions	45	3	42	0.067	30	–

== Playoffs ==
1st Round
4	Naray	3
5	LG	0
3	Daewoo	1
6	Samsung	3

Semifinals
1	Hyundai	3
4	Naray	0
2	Kia	3
6	Samsung	1

Finals
1	Hyundai	4
2	Kia	1

1998–1999 KBL Champions
Daejeon Hyundai Dynat
2nd title

== Prize money ==
- Daejeon Hyundai Dynat: KRW 150,000,000 (champions + regular-season 1st place)
- Busan Kia Enterprise: KRW 80,000,000 (runners-up + regular-season 2nd place)
- Incheon Daewoo Zeus: KRW 20,000,000 (regular-season 3rd place)
