= ABA Club Championship =

Former Asian basketball tournament for professional clubs

The ABA Club Championship was an Asian basketball tournament for professional clubs, organised by the Asian Basketball Association (ABA) under Dr. Carl Men Ky Ching. The ABA is not to be confused with FIBA Asia which Dr. Ching had also once presided. The tournament was first held in 1992. It was named Asian Basketball Super League from 1999 to 2001, and came to a climax in 2000. The tournament was suspended between 2002 and 2006, and has been held annually in China between 2007 and 2013. Unlike the FIBA Asia Champions Cup of today, most of ABA Club Championship's participants were from the Far East.

== Summary ==
Year	Dates	Host City	Champion	Final	Runner-up	Third-place	Most Valuable Player
1999	13/06-29/06	Shenzhen; Zhongshan; Hong Kong; Tokyo; Taipei	(China) Chinese All-Stars; Chinese Taipei's All-Stars (Finals suspended)
2000	08/06-13/07	More than 20 cities in 5 different countries and regions （Finals held in Beijing）	(United States) NBA Ambassadors	Best-of-3; 95–78; 103–111; 103–68	(China) Chinese All-Stars
2001	13/09-24/09	Taipei; Shanghai; Suzhou; Hangzhou; Dongguan; Macau	(South Korea) Seoul Samsung Thunders	Best-of-3; 74–64; 80–76	(Japan) Isuzu Giga Cats
2007	26/09-01/10	Dongguan	(South Korea) Seoul Samsung Thunders	Round-robin	(Iran) Iranian All-Stars	(Philippines) Air21 Express	(South Korea) Lee Won-soo (Samsung)
2008	14/09-18/09	Dongguan	(China) Guangdong Southern Tigers	80–71	(Japan) Rera Kamuy Hokkaido	(South Korea) Seoul Samsung Thunders	(China) Du Feng (Guangdong)
2009	20/09-23/09	Lanzhou	(Iran) Mahram Tehran	80–68	(China) Beijing Olympian	(South Korea) Seoul Samsung Thunders	(Iran) Samad Nikkhah Bahrami (Mahram)
2010	15/09-20/09	Haining	(South Korea) Seoul Samsung Thunders	83–82	(Philippines) Smart Gilas Pilipinas	(Iran) Iranian All-Stars	(South Korea) Eric Sandrin (Samsung)
2011	27/09-30/09	Guangzhou	(Chinese Taipei) Pauian Archiland	72–69	(China) Dongguan Leopards	(Japan) Ryukyu Golden Kings	(United States) Jeremy Lin (Dongguan)
2012	07/09-11/09	Shenzhen	(China) Guangdong Southern Tigers	91–87	(China) Guangzhou Liusui	(South Korea) Seoul Samsung Thunders	(China) Zhu Fangyu (Guangdong)
2012	24/09-28/09	Kaohsiung	(South Korea) Changwon LG Sakers	82–78	(Chinese Taipei) Pauian Archiland	(China) Guangdong Southern Tigers	(South Korea) Yang Woo-sub (LG)
2013	18/09-21/09	Wenzhou	(Iran) Iranian All-Stars	70–60	(South Korea) Ulsan Mobis Phoebus	(China) Zhejiang Lions	Saeid Davarpanah (Iran)
2013	24/09-26/09	Nanning	(South Korea) Changwon LG Sakers	87–78	(Iran) Iranian All-Stars	(China) Guangxi Rhino	(United States) Davon Jefferson (LG)

== See also ==
- FIBA Asia
- FIBA Asia Champions Cup
