= 2005–06 KBL season =

- League: Korean Basketball League
- Sport: Basketball
- Duration: October 21, 2005 – April 25, 2006

Regular Season
- Season champions: Ulsan Mobis Phoebus
- Season MVP: (South Korea) Seo Jang-hoon (Samsung) & (South Korea) Yang Dong-geun (Mobis)
- Top scorer: (United States) Dontae' Jones (KT&G)

Finals
- Champions: Seoul Samsung Thunders
- Runners-up: Ulsan Mobis Phoebus
- Finals MVP: (South Korea) Kang Hyuk (Samsung)

KBL seasons
- ← 2004–05 2006–07 →

The 2005–06 KCC Professional Basketball season was the tenth season of the Korean Basketball League.

== Regular season ==
RK	Team	G	W	L	PCT	GB	Tiebreaker
1	Ulsan Mobis Phoebus	54	36	18	0.667	–	–
2	Seoul Samsung Thunders	54	32	22	0.593	4	–
3	Wonju Dongbu Promy	54	31	23	0.574	5	–
4	Busan KTF Magic Wings	54	29	25	0.537	7	4–2
5	Jeonju KCC Egis	54	29	25	0.537	7	2–4
6	Daegu Orions	54	28	26	0.519	8	–
7	Anyang KT&G Kites	54	27	27	0.500	9	–
8	Changwon LG Sakers	54	26	28	0.481	10	–
9	Seoul SK Knights	54	24	30	0.444	12	–
10	Incheon ET Land Black Slamer	54	8	46	0.148	28	–

== Playoffs ==
1st Round
4	KTF	0
5	KCC	2
3	Dongbu	1
6	Orions	2

Semifinals
1	Mobis	3
5	KCC	1
2	Samsung	3
6	Orions	0

Finals
1	Mobis	0
2	Samsung	4

2005–2006 KBL Champions
Seoul Samsung Thunders
2nd title

== Prize money ==
- Seoul Samsung Thunders: KRW 150,000,000 (champions + regular-season 2nd place)
- Ulsan Mobis Phoebus: KRW 150,000,000 (runners-up + regular-season 1st place)
- Wonju Dongbu Promy: KRW 30,000,000 (regular-season 3rd place)
