= 2007–08 KBL season =

- League: Korean Basketball League
- Sport: Basketball
- Duration: October 18, 2007 – April 25, 2008
- TV partner(s): KBS, MBC, SBS, Xports, MBC-ESPN, SBS Sports

Regular Season
- Season champions: Wonju Dongbu Promy
- Season MVP: (South Korea) Kim Joo-sung (Dongbu)
- Top scorer: (United States) Terrence Shannon (ET Land)

Finals
- Champions: Wonju Dongbu Promy
- Runners-up: Seoul Samsung Thunders
- Finals MVP: (South Korea) Kim Joo-sung (Dongbu)

KBL seasons
- ← 2006–07 2008–09 →

The 2007–08 SK Telecom T Professional Basketball season was the 12th season of the Korean Basketball League.

== Regular season ==
RK	Team	G	W	L	PCT	GB	Tiebreaker
1	Wonju Dongbu Promy	54	38	16	0.704	–	–
2	Jeonju KCC Egis	54	33	21	0.611	5	–
3	Seoul Samsung Thunders	54	32	22	0.593	6	–
4	Anyang KT&G Kites	54	30	24	0.556	8	–
5	Seoul SK Knights	54	29	25	0.537	9	7–5
6	Changwon LG Sakers	54	29	25	0.537	9	6–6
7	Incheon ET Land Black Slamer	54	29	25	0.537	9	5–7
8	Busan KTF Magic Wings	54	24	30	0.444	14	–
9	Ulsan Mobis Phoebus	54	14	40	0.259	24	–
10	Daegu Orions	54	12	42	0.222	26	–

== Playoffs ==
1st Round
4	KT&G	2
5	SK	0
3	Samsung	2
6	LG	0

Semifinals
1	Dongbu	3
4	KT&G	1
2	KCC	0
3	Samsung	3

Finals
1	Dongbu	4
3	Samsung	1

2007–2008 KBL Champions
Wonju Dongbu Promy
3rd title

== Prize money ==
- Wonju Dongbu Promy: KRW 200,000,000 (champions + regular-season 1st place)
- Seoul Samsung Thunders: KRW 80,000,000 (runners-up + regular-season 3rd place)
- Jeonju KCC Egis: KRW 50,000,000 (regular-season 2nd place)
