= 2000–01 KBL season =

2000–2001 KBL season
- League: Korean Basketball League
- Sport: Basketball
- Duration: November 4, 2000 – April 6, 2001

Regular Season
- Season champions: Suwon Samsung Thunders
- Season MVP: (South Korea) Cho Sung-won (LG)
- Top scorer: (United States) Dennis Edwards (SBS)

Finals
- Champions: Suwon Samsung Thunders
- Runners-up: Changwon LG Sakers
- Finals MVP: (South Korea) Joo Hee-jung (Samsung)

KBL seasons
- ← 1999–2000 2001–02 →

The 2000–01 Anycall Professional Basketball season was the fifth season of the Korean Basketball League.

== Regular season ==
| RK | Team | G | W | L | PCT | GB | Tiebreaker |
|---|---|---|---|---|---|---|---|
| 1 | Suwon Samsung Thunders | 45 | 34 | 11 | 0.756 | – | – |
| 2 | Changwon LG Sakers | 45 | 30 | 15 | 0.667 | 4 | 4–1 |
| 3 | Cheongju SK Knights | 45 | 30 | 15 | 0.667 | 4 | 1–4 |
| 4 | Anyang SBS Stars | 45 | 26 | 19 | 0.578 | 8 | – |
| 5 | Incheon Shinsegi Bigs | 45 | 23 | 22 | 0.511 | 11 | – |
| 6 | Daejeon Hyundai Gullivers | 45 | 20 | 25 | 0.444 | 14 | – |
| 7 | Wonju Sambo Xers | 45 | 19 | 26 | 0.422 | 15 | – |
| 8 | Yeosu Goldbank Clickers | 45 | 17 | 28 | 0.378 | 17 | 3–2 |
| 9 | Busan Kia Enterprise | 45 | 17 | 28 | 0.378 | 17 | 2–3 |
| 10 | Daegu Tongyang Orions | 45 | 9 | 36 | 0.200 | 25 | – |

== Playoffs ==
1st Round
4 | SBS | 2
5 | Shinsegi | 1
3 | SK | 2
6 | Hyundai | 0

Semifinals
1 | Samsung | 3
4 | SBS | 1
2 | LG | 3
3 | SK | 2

Finals
1 | Samsung | 4
2 | LG | 1

2000–2001 KBL Champions
Suwon Samsung Thunders
1st title

== Prize money ==
- Suwon Samsung Thunders: KRW 150,000,000 (champions + regular-season 1st place)
- Changwon LG Sakers: KRW 80,000,000 (runners-up + regular-season 2nd place)
- Cheongju SK Knights: KRW 20,000,000 (regular-season 3rd place)
