= 2008–09 KBL season =

- League: Korean Basketball League
- Sport: Basketball
- Duration: October 31, 2008 – May 1, 2009
- TV partner(s): KBS, MBC, SBS, Xports, MBC-ESPN, SBS Sports

Regular Season
- Season champions: Ulsan Mobis Phoebus
- Season MVP: (South Korea) Joo Hee-jung (KT&G)
- Top scorer: (United States) Terrence Leather (Samsung)

Finals
- Champions: Jeonju KCC Egis
- Runners-up: Seoul Samsung Thunders
- Finals MVP: (South Korea) Choo Seung-kyun (KCC)

KBL seasons
- ← 2007–08 2009–10 →

The 2008–09 Dongbu Promy Professional Basketball season was the 13th season of the Korean Basketball League.

== Regular season ==
RK	Team	G	W	L	PCT	GB	Tiebreaker
1	Ulsan Mobis Phoebus	54	35	19	0.648	–	–
2	Wonju Dongbu Promy	54	33	21	0.611	2	–
3	Jeonju KCC Egis	54	31	23	0.574	4	–
4	Seoul Samsung Thunders	54	30	24	0.556	5	–
5	Changwon LG Sakers	54	29	25	0.537	6	6–6, +12
6	Incheon ET Land Black Slamer	54	29	25	0.537	6	6–6, +3
7	Anyang KT&G Kites	54	29	25	0.537	6	6–6, –15
8	Seoul SK Knights	54	24	30	0.444	11	–
9	Daegu Orions	54	18	36	0.333	17	–
10	Busan KTF Magic Wings	54	12	42	0.222	23	–

== Playoffs ==
1st Round
4	Samsung	3
5	LG	1
3	KCC	3
6	ET Land	2

Semifinals
1	Mobis	1
4	Samsung	3
2	Dongbu	2
3	KCC	3

Finals
4	Samsung	3
3	KCC	4

2008–2009 KBL Champions
Jeonju KCC Egis
4th title

== Prize money ==
- Jeonju KCC Egis: KRW 130,000,000 (champions + regular-season 3rd place)
- Ulsan Mobis Phoebus: KRW 100,000,000 (regular-season 1st place)
- Seoul Samsung Thunders: KRW 50,000,000 (runners-up)
- Wonju Dongbu Promy: KRW 50,000,000 (regular-season 2nd place)
