= 2002–03 KBL season =

- League: Korean Basketball League
- Sport: Basketball
- Duration: October 26, 2002 – April 13, 2003

Regular Season
- Season champions: Daegu Tongyang Orions
- Season MVP: (South Korea) Kim Byung-chul (Tongyang)
- Top scorer: (United States Virgin Islands) (Saint Vincent and the Grenadines) Leon Trimmingham (SK)

Finals
- Champions: Wonju TG Xers
- Runners-up: Daegu Tongyang Orions
- Finals MVP: (United States) David Jackson (TG)

KBL seasons
- ← 2001–02 2003–04 →

The 2002–03 Anycall Professional Basketball season was the seventh season of the Korean Basketball League.

== Regular season ==
RK	Team	G	W	L	PCT	GB	Tiebreaker
1	Daegu Tongyang Orions	54	38	16	0.704	–	4–2
2	Changwon LG Sakers	54	38	16	0.704	–	2–4
3	Wonju TG Xers	54	32	22	0.593	6	–
4	Yeosu Korea Tender Prumi	54	28	26	0.519	10	4–2
5	Seoul Samsung Thunders	54	28	26	0.519	10	2–4
6	Ulsan Mobis Automons	54	25	29	0.463	13	–
7	Incheon SK Bigs	54	23	31	0.426	15	–
8	Anyang SBS Stars	54	22	32	0.407	16	–
9	Jeonju KCC Egis	54	20	34	0.370	18	–
10	Seoul SK Knights	54	16	38	0.296	22	–

== Playoffs ==
1st Round
4	Korea Tender	2
5	Samsung	0
3	TG	2
6	Mobis	0

Semifinals
1	Tongyang	3
4	Korea Tender	0
2	LG	2
3	TG	3

Finals
1	Tongyang	2
3	TG	4

2002–2003 KBL Champions
Wonju TG Xers
1st title

== Prize money ==
- Wonju TG Xers: KRW 120,000,000 (champions + regular-season 3rd place)
- Daegu Tongyang Orions: KRW 100,000,000 (runners-up + regular-season 1st place)
- Changwon LG Sakers: KRW 30,000,000 (regular-season 2nd place)
