= 2003–04 KBL season =

- League: Korean Basketball League
- Sport: Basketball
- Duration: October 25, 2003 – April 10, 2004

Regular Season
- Season champions: Wonju TG Sambo Xers
- Season MVP: (South Korea) Kim Joo-sung (TG Sambo)
- Top scorer: (Cameroon) Charles Minlend (KCC)

Finals
- Champions: Jeonju KCC Egis
- Runners-up: Wonju TG Sambo Xers
- Finals MVP: (South Korea) Lee Sang-min (KCC)

KBL seasons
- ← 2002–03 2004–05 →

The 2003–04 Anycall Professional Basketball season was the eighth season of the Korean Basketball League.

== Regular season ==
| RK | Team | G | W | L | PCT | GB | Tiebreaker |
|---|---|---|---|---|---|---|---|
| 1 | Wonju TG Sambo Xers | 54 | 40 | 14 | 0.741 | – | – |
| 2 | Jeonju KCC Egis | 54 | 39 | 15 | 0.722 | 1 | – |
| 3 | Daegu Orions | 54 | 32 | 22 | 0.593 | 8 | 3–3, +19 |
| 4 | Incheon ET Land Black Slamer | 54 | 32 | 22 | 0.593 | 8 | 3–3, –19 |
| 5 | Seoul Samsung Thunders | 54 | 28 | 26 | 0.519 | 12 | 3–3, +5 |
| 6 | Changwon LG Sakers | 54 | 28 | 26 | 0.519 | 12 | 3–3, –5 |
| 7 | Seoul SK Knights | 54 | 19 | 35 | 0.352 | 21 | 4–2 |
| 8 | Busan KTF Magic Wings | 54 | 19 | 35 | 0.352 | 21 | 2–4 |
| 9 | Anyang SBS Stars | 54 | 18 | 36 | 0.333 | 22 | – |
| 10 | Ulsan Mobis Automons | 54 | 15 | 39 | 0.278 | 25 | – |

== Playoffs ==
1st Round
4 | ET Land | 2
5 | Samsung | 1
3 | Orions | 1
6 | LG | 2

Semifinals
1 | TG Sambo | 3
4 | ET Land | 0
2 | KCC | 3
6 | LG | 0

Finals
1 | TG Sambo | 3
2 | KCC | 4

2003–2004 KBL Champions
Jeonju KCC Egis
3rd title

== Prize money ==
- Jeonju KCC Egis: KRW 130,000,000 (champions + regular-season 2nd place)
- Wonju TG Sambo Xers: KRW 100,000,000 (runners-up + regular-season 1st place)
- Daegu Orions: KRW 20,000,000 (regular-season 3rd place)
