= 2004–05 KBL season =

- League: Korean Basketball League
- Sport: Basketball
- Duration: October 29, 2004 – April 17, 2005

Regular Season
- Season champions: Wonju TG Sambo Xers
- Season MVP: (South Korea) Shin Ki-sung (TG Sambo)
- Top scorer: (United States) Nate Johnson (Orions)

Finals
- Champions: Wonju TG Sambo Xers
- Runners-up: Jeonju KCC Egis
- Finals MVP: (South Korea) Kim Joo-sung (TG Sambo)

KBL seasons
- ← 2003–04 2005–06 →

The 2004–05 Anycall Professional Basketball season was the ninth season of the Korean Basketball League.

== Regular season ==
RK	Team	G	W	L	PCT	GB	Tiebreaker
1	Wonju TG Sambo Xers	54	36	18	0.667	–	–
2	Jeonju KCC Egis	54	34	20	0.630	2	–
3	Anyang SBS Stars	54	33	21	0.611	3	–
4	Busan KTF Magic Wings	54	32	22	0.593	4	–
5	Seoul Samsung Thunders	54	27	27	0.500	9	–
6	Daegu Orions	54	26	28	0.481	10	–
7	Ulsan Mobis Phoebus	54	24	30	0.444	12	3–3, +19
8	Seoul SK Knights	54	24	30	0.444	12	3–3, –19
9	Changwon LG Sakers	54	17	37	0.315	19	3–3, +25
10	Incheon ET Land Black Slamer	54	17	37	0.315	19	3–3, –25

== Playoffs ==
1st Round
4	KTF	0
5	Samsung	2
3	SBS	2
6	Orions	0

Semifinals
1	TG Sambo	3
5	Samsung	0
2	KCC	3
3	SBS	1

Finals
1	TG Sambo	4
2	KCC	2

2004–2005 KBL Champions
Wonju TG Sambo Xers
2nd title

== Prize money ==
- Wonju TG Sambo Xers: KRW 150,000,000 (champions + regular-season 1st place)
- Jeonju KCC Egis: KRW 80,000,000 (runners-up + regular-season 2nd place)
- Anyang SBS Stars: KRW 20,000,000 (regular-season 3rd place)
