= 2006–07 KBL season =

- League: Korean Basketball League
- Sport: Basketball
- Duration: October 19, 2006 – May 1, 2007

Regular season
- Season champions: Ulsan Mobis Phoebus
- Season MVP: (South Korea) Yang Dong-geun (Mobis)
- Top scorer: (United States) Pete Mickeal (Orions)

Finals
- Champions: Ulsan Mobis Phoebus
- Runners-up: Busan KTF Magic Wings
- Finals MVP: (South Korea) Yang Dong-geun (Mobis)

KBL seasons
- ← 2005–06 2007–08 →

The 2006–07 Hyundai Mobis Professional Basketball season was the 11th season of the Korean Basketball League.

== Regular season ==
RK	Team	G	W	L	PCT	GB	Tiebreaker
1	Ulsan Mobis Phoebus	54	36	18	0.667	–	–
2	Changwon LG Sakers	54	32	22	0.593	4	3–3, +14
3	Busan KTF Magic Wings	54	32	22	0.593	4	3–3, –14
4	Daegu Orions	54	31	23	0.574	5	–
5	Seoul Samsung Thunders	54	29	25	0.537	7	–
6	Anyang KT&G Kites	54	25	29	0.463	11	–
7	Seoul SK Knights	54	24	30	0.444	12	–
8	Wonju Dongbu Promy	54	23	31	0.426	13	5–1
9	Incheon ET Land Black Slamer	54	23	31	0.426	13	1–5
10	Jeonju KCC Egis	54	15	39	0.278	21	–

== Playoffs ==
1st Round
4	Orions	2
5	Samsung	1
3	KTF	2
6	KT&G	0

Semifinals
1	Mobis	3
4	Orions	0
2	LG	1
3	KTF	3

Finals
1	Mobis	4
3	KTF	3

2006–2007 KBL Champions
Ulsan Mobis Phoebus
2nd title

== Prize money ==
- Ulsan Mobis Phoebus: KRW 200,000,000 (champions + regular-season 1st place)
- Busan KTF Magic Wings: KRW 80,000,000 (runners-up + regular-season 3rd place)
- Changwon LG Sakers: KRW 50,000,000 (regular-season 2nd place)
