= Seoul Samsung Thunders =

Seoul Samsung Thunders 서울 삼성 썬더스
- League: Korean Basketball League
- Founded: 1978; 48 years ago
- History: Samsung Men's Basketball Club; 1978–1982; Samsung Electronics Basketball Club; 1982–1996; Suwon Samsung Thunders; 1996–2001; Seoul Samsung Thunders; 2001–present
- Arena: Jamsil Arena
- Capacity: 11,069
- Location: Seoul, Republic of Korea
- Team colors: Blue, white, yellow
- Head coach: Kim Hyo-beom
- Team captain: Lee Dong-yeop
- Affiliation: Cheil Worldwide
- Championships: 2 Korean Leagues
- Retired numbers: 10 Kim Hyun-jun
- Website: thunders.kbl.or.kr
Home	Away

Seoul Samsung Thunders (Korean: 서울 삼성 썬더스) is a professional basketball team, competing in the Korean Basketball League. Ever since the club was founded in 1978, they have been associated with Samsung Electronics. Initially based in Suwon, they relocated to Seoul in 2001 and have played their home games at Jamsil Arena ever since.

== History ==
The Thunders were founded in 1978, and joined the professional Korean Basketball League (KBL) in 1997. They won two championships in 2001 and 2006 with players such as Moon Kyung-eun, Lee Sang-min and Seo Jang-hoon.

== Team names ==
- 1978–1982: Samsung Men's Basketball Club
- 1982–1996: Samsung Electronics Basketball Club
- 1996–2001: Suwon Samsung Thunders
- 2001–present: Seoul Samsung Thunders

== Current roster ==
Note: Flags indicate national team eligibility at FIBA-sanctioned events. Players may hold other non-FIBA nationalities not displayed.

Seoul Samsung Thunders roster
Players
Coaches

Pos.	No.	Nat.	Name	Ht.	Wt.	Age
G	1	(South Korea)	Lee Dong-yeop	1.93 m (6 ft 4 in)		32 – 22 February 1994
G	2	(South Korea)	Lee Ho-hyun	1.82 m (6 ft 0 in)		33 – 2 December 1992
G	3	(South Korea)	Lee Jung-hyun (C)	1.91 m (6 ft 3 in)		39 – 3 March 1987
G	5	(South Korea)	Kim Si-rae	1.78 m (5 ft 10 in)		37 – 22 March 1989
F	6	(South Korea)	Choi Seung-wook	1.90 m (6 ft 3 in)		32 – 15 April 1994
G	7	(South Korea)	Kim Hyun-soo	1.83 m (6 ft 0 in)		36 – 31 January 1990
PG	8	(South Korea)	Kim Moo-sung	1.84 m (6 ft 0 in)		29 – 28 March 1997
F	9	(South Korea)	Jang Min-guk	1.99 m (6 ft 6 in)		37 – 5 July 1989
C	11	(South Korea)	Lee Weon-seok	2.06 m (6 ft 9 in)		26 – 30 January 2000
G	14	(South Korea)	Kim Jin-young	1.93 m (6 ft 4 in)		28 – 22 June 1998
F	17	(South Korea)	Cha Min-seok	1.99 m (6 ft 6 in)		25 – 16 September 2001
F	19	(South Korea)	Kang Ba-il	1.93 m (6 ft 4 in)		31 – 2 March 1995
G	20	(South Korea)	Park Min-chae	1.83 m (6 ft 0 in)		26 – 28 August 2000
G	21	(South Korea)	Kim Gwang-cheol	1.85 m (6 ft 1 in)		32 – 27 March 1994
C	22	(South Korea)	Kim Han-sol	1.97 m (6 ft 6 in)		32 – 28 August 1994
F	24	(South Korea)	Shin Dong-hyuk	1.91 m (6 ft 3 in)		26 – 20 January 2000
G	25	(South Korea)	Jeon Hyung-jun	1.81 m (5 ft 11 in)		28 – 14 January 1998
C	32	(South Korea)	Jo Woo-sung	2.06 m (6 ft 9 in)		28 – 18 September 1998
PF		(United States)	Darral Willis (I)			30 – 21 January 1996
C		(United States)	Anthony Morse (I)			32 – 13 April 1994

Head coach

- (South Korea) Eun Hee-seok

Assistant coach(es)

- (South Korea) Kim Hyo-beom
- (South Korea) Lee Doo-hun
- (South Korea) Kim Bo-hyun

Legend

- (C) Team captain
- (I) Import player
- Injured

- Roster
Updated: 15 January 2023

== Season by season ==
Year	Regular season			Playoffs
Year	Position	Won	Lost	Playoffs
1997	8th	6	15	Did not qualify
1997–98	9th	17	28	Did not qualify
1998–99	6th	25	20	Semifinals
1999–00	3rd	23	22	Semifinals
2000–01	1st	34	11	Champions
2001–02	8th	24	30	Did not qualify
2002–03	5th	28	26	First round
2003–04	5th	28	26	First round
2004–05	5th	27	27	Semifinals
2005–06	2nd	32	22	Champions
2006–07	5th	29	25	First round
2007–08	3rd	32	22	Runners-up
2008–09	4th	30	24	Runners-up
2009–10	6th	26	28	First round
2010–11	6th	27	27	First round
2011–12	10th	13	41	Did not qualify
2012–13	6th	22	32	First round
2013–14	8th	19	35	Did not qualify
2014–15	10th	11	43	Did not qualify
2015–16	5th	29	25	First round
2016–17	3rd	34	20	Runners-up
2017–18	7th	25	29	Did not qualify
2018–19	10th	11	43	Did not qualify
2019–20 (Note: The 2019–20 season was cut short due to the COVID-19 pandemic in South Korea.)	7th	19	24	Not held
2020–21	7th	24	30	Did not qualify
2021–22	10th	9	45	Did not qualify
2022–23	10th	14	40	Did not qualify
2023–24	10th	14	40	Did not qualify
2024–25	10th	16	38	Did not qualify
2025–26	10th	16	38	Did not qualify

== Honours ==
=== Domestic ===
- Korean Basketball League championship

Winners: 2000–01, 2005–06
Runners-up: 2007–08, 2008–09, 2016–17

- Korean Basketball League regular season

Winners: 2000–01
Runners-up: 2005–06

=== Continental ===
- FIBA Asia Champions Cup

Third place: 1988

- ABA Club Championship

Winners: 2001, 2007, 2010
Third place: 2008, 2009

=== International invitationals ===
- Merlion Cup

Third place: 2016
