= Busan KCC Egis =

- League: Korean Basketball League
- Established: March 1978; 48 years ago
- History: Hyundai Basketball Team; 1978–1996; Daejeon Hyundai Dynat; 1997–1999; Daejeon Hyundai Gullivers; 1999–2001; Jeonju KCC Egis; 2001–2023; Busan KCC Egis; 2023–present
- Arena: Busan Sajik Gymnasium
- Capacity: 14,099
- Location: Busan, South Korea
- Team colours: Navy, gold, white
- Team manager: Choi Hyung-gil
- Head coach: Lee Sang-min
- Team captain: Choi Jun-yong
- Ownership: Jung Jae-hoon
- Affiliation: KCC
- Championships: 7 Korean Leagues
- Retired numbers: 4 Choo Seung-gyun; 11 Lee Sang-min
- Website: Official website
Home	Away

The Busan KCC Egis (Korean: 부산 KCC 이지스) is a professional basketball club based in Busan, South Korea. The team competes in the Korean Basketball League (KBL) and has established a substantial fanbase in South Korea. Founded in 1997, the team was initially based in Daejeon and was later relocated to Jeonju and Busan, respectively.

== History ==
The team was founded in March 1978 as the Hyundai Basketball Team, owned and sponsored by Hyundai. In 2001, the club, named Hyundai Gullivers at the time, relocated from Daejeon to Jeonju. In the same year, Kumgang Korea Chemical (now KCC) acquired the team after the financial difficulties of Hyundai Electronics.

After 22 years in Jeonju, the KCC Egis relocated to Busan in 2023, making the return of professional basketball to the city following the KT Sonicboom's departure two years prior. The decision to relocate was prompted by delays in the construction of a new arena in Jeonju, which had been promised six years earlier.

In May 2024, the Egis won their sixth KBL championship following a 4–1 win over the Suwon KT Sonicboom, becoming the first fifth-seeded team to win the title. Heo Ung was named Finals MVP.

== Home arenas ==
- Chungmu Gymnasium (1997–2001)
- Jeonju Gymnasium (2001–2023)
- Busan Sajik Gymnasium (2023–present)

== Players ==
=== Retired numbers ===
- 4 Choo Seung-gyun, SF, 1997–2012
- 11 Lee Sang-min, PG, 1997–2007

=== Current roster ===
Note: Flags indicate national team eligibility at FIBA-sanctioned events. Players may hold other non-FIBA nationalities not displayed.

Busan KCC Egis roster
Players
Coaches

Pos.	No.	Nat.	Name	Ht.	Wt.	Age
G	1	(South Korea)	Lee Ho-hyun	1.83 m (6 ft 0 in)		33 – 2 December 1992
F	2	(South Korea)	Choi Jun-yong	2.00 m (6 ft 7 in)		32 – 4 April 1994
G	3	(South Korea)	Heo Ung	1.85 m (6 ft 1 in)		33 – 5 August 1993
G	5	(South Korea)	Kim Dong-hyun	1.90 m (6 ft 3 in)		24 – 15 February 2002
G	6	(South Korea)	Song Dong-hun	1.74 m (5 ft 9 in)		26 – 3 April 2000
G	7	(South Korea)	Jung Chang-young (C)	1.93 m (6 ft 4 in)		38 – 24 January 1988
G	9	(South Korea)	Jeon Tae-young	1.82 m (6 ft 0 in)		31 – 24 March 1995
G	10	(South Korea)	Lee Joo-young	1.82 m (6 ft 0 in)		25 – 20 March 2001
F	15	(United States)	Deonte Burton (I)	1.94 m (6 ft 4 in)		32 – 31 January 1994
F	17	(South Korea)	Jeon Jun-beom	1.94 m (6 ft 4 in)		35 – 27 August 1991
F	19	(South Korea)	Lee Geun-hwi	1.88 m (6 ft 2 in)		28 – 9 June 1998
F	21	(South Korea)	Yeo Jun-hyeong	1.98 m (6 ft 6 in)		26 – 9 August 2000
G	23	(South Korea)	Jung Bae-kwon	1.84 m (6 ft 0 in)		25 – 1 April 2001
G	25	(Canada)	Calvin Epistola	1.76 m (5 ft 9 in)		30 – 29 September 1996
F	33	(South Korea)	Lee Seoung-hyun	1.97 m (6 ft 6 in)		34 – 16 April 1992
C	44	(United States)	Leon Williams (I)	1.98 m (6 ft 6 in)		40 – 24 July 1986
F	55	(South Korea)	Song Kyo-chang	1.99 m (6 ft 6 in)		30 – 3 July 1996

Head coach

- (South Korea) Jeon Chang-jin

Assistant coach(es)

- (South Korea) Kang Yang-taek
- (South Korea) Shin Myung-ho

Legend

- (C) Team captain
- (I) Import player
- Injured

- Roster
Updated: 22 October 2024

=== Team captains ===
- Jung Jae-kun (2001–2004)
- Cho Sung-won (2004–2005)
- Lee Sang-min (2005–2007)
- Choo Seung-gyun (2007–2012)
- Lim Jae-hyun (2012–2013)
- Shin Myung-ho (2013–2018)
- Ha Seung-jin (2018–2019)
- Lee Jung-hyun (2019–2022)
- Jung Chang-young (2022–2025)
- Choi Jun-yong (2025–present)

== Coaches ==
- Shin Sun-woo (1997–2005)
- Heo Jae (2005–2015)
- Choo Seung-gyun (2015–2018)
- Stacey Augmon (2018–2019)
- Jeon Chang-jin (2019–2025)
- Lee Sang-min (2025–present)

== Season-by-season record ==
Season	Division	Pos.	W–L	Playoffs
1997	KBL	7th	7–14	Did not qualify
1997–98	KBL	1st	31–14	Champions
1998–99	KBL	1st	33–12	Champions
1999–2000	KBL	1st	33–12	Runners-up
2000–01	KBL	6th	20–25	First round
2001–02	KBL	3rd	30–24	Semifinals
2002–03	KBL	9th	20–34	Did not qualify
2003–04	KBL	2nd	39–15	Champions
2004–05	KBL	2nd	34–20	Runners-up
2005–06	KBL	5th	29–25	Semifinals
2006–07	KBL	10th	15–39	Did not qualify
2007–08	KBL	2nd	33–21	Semifinals
2008–09	KBL	3rd	31–23	Champions
2009–10	KBL	3rd	35–19	Runners-up
2010–11	KBL	3rd	34–20	Champions
2011–12	KBL	4th	31–23	First round
2012–13	KBL	10th	13–41	Did not qualify
2013–14	KBL	7th	20–34	Did not qualify
2014–15	KBL	9th	12–42	Did not qualify
2015–16	KBL	1st	36–18	Runners-up
2016–17	KBL	10th	17–37	Did not qualify
2017–18	KBL	3rd	35–19	Semifinals
2018–19	KBL	4th	28–26	Semifinals
2019–20	KBL	4th	23–19	Not held (Note: The playoffs were cancelled due to the COVID-19 pandemic in South Korea.)
2020–21	KBL	1st	36–18	Runners-up
2021–22	KBL	9th	21–33	Did not qualify
2022–23	KBL	6th	24–30	First round
2023–24	KBL	5th	30–24	Champions
2024–25	KBL	9th	18–36	Did not qualify
2025–26	KBL	6th	28–26	Champions

== Honours ==
=== Domestic ===
- Korean Basketball League championship

Winners (7): 1997–98, 1998–99, 2003–04, 2008–09, 2010–11, 2023–24, 2025–26
Runners-up (5): 1999–2000, 2004–05, 2009–10, 2015–16, 2020–21

- Korean Basketball League regular season

Winners (5): 1997–98, 1998–99, 1999–2000, 2015–16, 2020–21
Runners-up (3): 2003–04, 2004–05, 2007–08

- KBL Cup

Winners: 2023

=== International invitationals ===
- Merlion Cup

Third place: 2017
