= Wonju DB Promy =

Wonju DB Promy 원주 DB 프로미
- League: Korean Basketball League
- Established: 1996; 30 years ago
- History: Naray Mobile Communication Basketball Team; 1996; Wonju Naray Blue Bird; 1996–1999; Wonju Sambo Xers; 1999–2002; Wonju TG Xers; 2002–2003; Wonju TG Sambo Xers; 2003–2005; Wonju Dongbu Promy; 2005–2017; Wonju DB Promy; 2017–present
- Arena: Wonju Gymnasium
- Capacity: 4,600
- Location: Wonju, Gangwon Province, South Korea
- Team colours: Green, white
- Head coach: Lee Sang-beom
- Team captain: Kang Sang-jae
- Affiliation: DB Insurance
- Championships: 3 Korean Leagues
- Retired numbers: 9 Hur Jae; 32 Kim Joo-sung
- Website: promy.kbl.or.kr
Home	Away

The Wonju DB Promy is a professional basketball club in the Korean Basketball League (KBL), located in the city of Wonju. From its founding in 1996, the team has always been based in its home province of Gangwon. It has the rare distinction of being the only team in the KBL to have never changed its hometown despite changing names and corporate sponsors several times. Due to this long-standing relationship with the city of Wonju, the team enjoys a particularly strong local fanbase and is Gangwon Province's oldest sports team.

== History ==
=== Pre-KBL era ===
Wonju DB Promy traces its origins to the basketball team founded by Naray Telecom in 1996. It was one of several basketball teams started by corporate companies hoping to take advantage of the "basketball craze" taking place during the early to mid-1990s. By then, the Korean Basketball Association was starting to organize a professional league. Prior to 1997, domestic basketball was an amateur sport and all teams, whether sponsored by a corporate company or university, participated in the National Basketball Festival (Korean: 농구대잔치) competition. The Naray team was already based in Wonju and it was agreed that the team would remain there with the start of the new professional Korean Basketball League (KBL).

Naray Telecom bought over Korea Development Bank's basketball team. The KDB had opted out of registering its basketball team as a professional sports team. Although Naray took in some of its players, it did not inherit the legacy of the former team. The KDB team had been started during the 1950s, not long after the Korean War ended. The Industrial Bank of Korea likewise had sold its basketball team that year, and its new corporate sponsor restarted the team as Gwangju Nasan Flamans. No KBL team has been sponsored by a domestic financial institution or bank ever since.

=== Early years in the KBL (1997–1999) ===
Naray Telecom registered its team in the professional league as Naray Blue Bird and adopted yellow and blue as its jersey colors. It was one of the few teams not based in a major metropolitan area, as Wonju's population count still remains under half a million even in more recent years. Nonetheless, Naray Telecom was keen to establish ties with the community and Naray Blue Bird was one of the earliest KBL teams to set up community projects, such as basketball camps for interested school children and coached by their own players. They were runners-up in the inaugural KBL Championship despite being a relatively new team. Naray Blue Bird made news by trading Jeong In-kyo for Busan Kia Enterprise star Hur Jae in 1998.

=== Xers era (1999–2005) ===
In 1999, Naray Telecom's parent company Sambo Computer took over the naming rights and the team became Wonju Sambo Xers. For a period of time, the Xers were mostly a mid to lower-ranked team and failed to qualify for the play-offs for two consecutive seasons. The team's name also changed several more times while it was under the sponsorship of Sambo Computer or its subsidiaries.

With the drafting of center-forward Kim Joo-sung, the TG Xers were dubbed "Speed TG" for its high-tempo offense helmed by Kim and guard Shin Ki-sung. The team gained a reputation as a well-rounded unit due to a combination of Kim's rebounding and blocking prowess, Shin's speed and shooting accuracy, Hur's experience and versatility and foreign recruit Leon Derricks' physical strength. They finished third in the 2002–03 regular season and reached the finals of the play-offs, where they came up against a Kim Seung-hyun-inspired Daegu Tongyang Orions, the defending champions. TG Xers ultimately emerged as champions, winning four out of six games of the Championship final.

For a period of time, the TG Xers were dubbed the "Yongsan–Chung-Ang Alumni Team" due to a large number of its players being alumni of Yongsan High School and Chung-Ang University. The head coach at that time Chun Chang-jin and several of the team's management staff were also from either Yongsan High School or Chung-Ang University. The term "Yongsan mafia" originated from this era and has been used by the media to refer to hak-yeon (Hangul: 학연, the Korean-language equivalent term of "old boy network") in domestic basketball, even if the aforementioned mentioned names were never contemporaries or actually knew one another from their school days.

The following season, the TG Xers finally topped the league table and finished runners-up in the play-offs, losing to Jeonju KCC Egis in the final. However, rumors began circulating among fans about the team's future after news broke in May 2005 that its sponsor's parent company Sambo Computer (known as TriGem Computer in English-language media) was in court receivership due to financial troubles. There were speculations that the team would be folded if no new sponsor could be found. By then, Hur had already retired, and several key players had left for other clubs at the end of the 2004–05 season. The off-season was spent in turmoil and uncertainty, as the coaching staff and players went without pay for up to four months due to Sambo Computer being in receivership.

Dongbu Group, via its subsidiary Dongbu Insurance, revealed its intent on acquiring the basketball team from TG Sambo. After protracted negoatiations Dongbu officials confirmed the acquisition on October 7, just weeks before the first game of the 2005–06 season, for an undisclosed price and announced that all remaining players, coaches and staff would be retained.

=== Dongbu/DB era (2005–present) ===
Dongbu Insurance's acquisition of the team was only confirmed just before the 2005–06 season started, and the team name was changed to Wonju Dongbu Promy to reflect this. As Dongbu's founder was from Gangwon Province, it opted not to move the basketball team. The color green was adopted as its new team color and has been associated with the team ever since. Under the new sponsors, the team has seen more stability and did not change its name or rebrand as many times as during the Xers era, which had been a thorny issue among even its most loyal fans. Other than a minor name change and a new team logo due to Dongbu's corporate rebranding at the beginning of the 2017–18 season, it has not gone through any major rebranding or name change ever since.

During the 2011–12 season, Dongbu gained the nickname "Dongbu Mountain Fortress" (Korean: 동부산성) for recording the league's best defensive record. The name also refers to the fact that Wonju is located at the foot of Chiaksan (Chiak Mountain). Kim Joo-sung, foreign recruit Rod Benson and the current longest-serving player and that season's MVP Yoon Ho-young were key players in the regular season champions' 81% winning rate, collectively posting a defensive rating of 98.2. The nickname eventually stuck with the team, but its meaning has evolved into a tongue in cheek reference to its penchant for signing players over 200 meters such as centers Kim Jong-kyu and Chinanu Onuaku and forward Kang Sang-jae.

At the end of the 2012–13 season, Dongbu played at its home ground Chiak Gymnasium (Korean: 치악체육관) for the last time. Up until then, it had the distinction of being the only KBL team to have never changed home ground from the inaugural season of the league. The Chiak Gymnasium, which was opened in 1980, had become a much-maligned venue for fans and players of visiting basketball teams due to its outdated facilities, especially the narrow seating layout and lack of ventilation in the toilets and players' locker rooms. The lack of financial resources during the pre-Dongbu-acquisition days meant that the team did not have its own dedicated training facilities and players worked out at nearby neighborhood gyms. During the March game against Incheon Electroland Elephants, the last game of the regular season for both teams, Dongbu players wore a commemorative jersey with "Remember Chiak 1997–2013" emblazoned on the front. The commemorative jerseys were available for purchase at a price of ₩6000, the price of a player's jersey back in 1997.

Preparations for the upcoming 2013–14 season in their newly-completed home ground were disrupted when it emerged that head coach Kang Dong-hee was under investigation for match-fixing. The investigation into Kang was linked to a wider crackdown and investigation into illegal sports betting which involved a number of personalities from the entertainment industry, including Kim Yong-man and Lee Soo-geun. After Kang's resignation prior to his conviction, Dongbu went through a period of instability as Lee Choong-hee took over but then resigned in the middle of the 2013–14 season.

== Honours ==
- Korean Basketball League championship

Winners (3): 2002–03, 2004–05, 2007–08
Runners-up (6): 1997, 2003–04, 2010–11, 2011–12, 2014–15, 2017–18

- Korean Basketball League regular season

Winners (6): 2003–04, 2004–05, 2007–08, 2011–12, 2017–18, 2023–24
Runners-up (2): 2008–09, 2014–15

- KBL Cup

Winners: 2024
Runners-up: 2021
