= Suwon KT Sonicboom =

- Leagues: Korean Basketball League
- Founded: 1997; 29 years ago
- Arena: Suwon KT Sonicboom Arena
- Capacity: 3,660
- Location: Suwon, South Korea
- Team colours: Black, red, white
- Team manager: Choi Hyeon-jun
- Head coach: Moon Kyung-eun
- Affiliation: KT
- Website: sonicboom.kbl.or.kr

Suwon KT Sonicboom (Korean: 수원 KT 소닉붐) is a professional basketball club based in Suwon, South Korea that plays in the Korean Basketball League. Their home games are played at the Suwon KT Sonicboom Arena. Founded in 1997, the team was initially based in Gwangju and was later relocated to Yeosu, Busan and Suwon, respectively.

== History ==
=== Foundation and Gwangju era ===
With the foundation of the professional Korean Basketball League in 1997, Gwangju Nasan Flamans was the ninth team founded as an expansion franchise and was then sponsored by clothing manufacturer Nasan Group. The company bought over the Industrial Bank of Korea's basketball team prior to the start of the newly-founded professional league. While some players from the former IBK team remained, the new team did not inherit its legacy and history with the takeover. The IBK basketball team had been founded in 1962 and was one of the oldest teams in domestic basketball.

The new team participated in the inaugural KBL season, which began in February 1997. As a relatively new franchise sponsored by a smaller corporate company, the Nasan Flamans did not have star players of that era, nor did they have the financial resources to lure the biggest names like some of their counterparts. It was one of the few franchises whose players were not selected for the 1998 Asian Games, although one of the better-known players from that era was future South Korea national team coach Kim Sang-shik, the free throw percentage leader for the 1997–98 season. Due to financial constraints, the team had to split its home ground between Yeomju Gymnasium in Gwangju and the cheaper Wollmyeong Gymnasium in Gunsan. Despite the challenges, the team managed to reach the play-offs.

The Nasan Group faced bankruptcy due to the 1997 Asian financial crisis, which had hit South Korea hard. Instead of dissolving the team, Nasan Group eventually sold it to Goldbank for 6.5 billion won after the 1998–99 season. The team was renamed Goldbank Clickers. It began investing in bigger names, including Yonsei University star and 1998 Asian Games silver medalist Cho Sang-hyun and rookie forward Hyun Joo-yup. However, Goldbank's instability at corporate level meant that the team was often neglected to the point where they had no permanent training facility and had to train and practice at municipal or university-owned gymnasiums and players' accommodations were far away from their home ground.

=== Yeosu era (2000–2003) ===
The Goldbank Clickers relocated to Yeosu ahead of the 2000–01 season. It again changed sponsors to Korea Tender but its financial situation was so unstable that the KBL had to manage the team on Korea Tender's behalf.

During the 2002–03 season, the team only had an acting coach, Lee Sang-yoon, in its coaching staff and a roster of relatively unknown players. Under Lee, the players' highly-organized play and stamina gained them a reputation as the underdogs to beat that season. The unfancied team made the play-offs, notably beating Seoul Samsung Thunders before losing to Daegu Tongyang Orions in the semifinals.

=== Busan era (2003–2021) ===
The team moved to Busan in 2003 and became the new tenant of Sajik Arena, which had been empty ever since Busan Kia Enterprise moved to Ulsan and became Ulsan Hyundai Automons in 2001. It was renamed Maxten and subsequently Magic Wings after KTF took over as its corporate sponsor. Under new head coach Choo Il-seung, the KTF Magic Wings reached the play-offs for three consecutive seasons. The drafting of Hanyang University shooting guard Cho Sung-min in 2006 and signing of veteran point guard Shin Ki-sung, both known for their shooting skills, paved the way for KTF Magic Wings to be a contender for the Championship. However, Cho's enlistment for mandatory military service after the 2006–07 season was a major blow.

With the merger of KTF with Korea Telecom to form KT Corporation in early 2009, the team came under the sponsorship of the newly-merged company and adopted its present name KT Sonicboom ahead of the 2009–10 season. KT Sonicboom finished runner-up in the 2009–10 league table and qualified for an automatic spot in the play-off semi-final but lost to Jeonju KCC Egis. The disappointment of the 2019–10 season was erased when they won the 2010–11 regular season title. Park Sang-oh won the KBL Most Valuable Player Award (MVP), the first time a player from KT Sonicboom or its predecessor teams have won it.

Since 2011, KT Sonicboom's fortunes have been mixed. They failed to make the play-offs for three consecutive seasons, from 2015–16 until 2017–18. On the other hand, Cho became the league's free-throw percentage leader for four consecutive seasons. In January 2017, KT Sonicboom's management shocked pundits and observers by announcing that Cho, who was the team's longest-serving player and considered to be its franchise star, would be traded to Changwon LG Sakers in exchange for another player and its highest-drawn pick of the upcoming rookie draft. At that time, it was unheard of in the KBL for a team go through such an extent to secure a pick in a rookie draft. The drafting of the collegiate U-League's two biggest prospects Heo Hoon and Yang Hong-seok in the 2017 rookie draft and the arrival of new head coach Seo Dong-chul in 2018 saw KT Sonicboom rise to become a contender for the play-offs once again. In his first season in charge, Seo led the bottom-ranking team to sixth place. The 2019–20 season was ended prematurely and results forfeited due to the COVID-19 pandemic, although Heo winning the MVP Award made him the first KT Sonicboom player in nine years and only the second KT Sonicboom player to win it. The 2020–21 season ended on a bittersweet note as KT Sonicboom narrowly lost to Anyang KGC in all three of its quarterfinal play-off games but became the first team in which its domestic players ranked first in four different statistical categories for a single season: points (domestic), rebounds (domestic), assists (overall) and three-point field goal percentage.

With the KBL's new "hometown" policy encouraging teams to have their home ground and training facilities located in the same vicinity, KT Sonicboom opted to relocate to Suwon. Its management headquarters and training facilities had been located in Suwon since 2010. Prior to the official relocation, the players had to be bussed down all the way to Busan to play its so-called "home" games there. Initially KT had sought to relocate the team's facilities and have their players move to Busan but decided against it after failing to reach an agreement with the Busan local government.

=== Suwon era (2021–present) ===
KT Sonicboom became the new tenant of the Chilbo Gymnasium, which was home to Busan BNK Sum for the 2018–19 season and hosted some U-League games. It was renovated and renamed Suwon KT Sonicboom Arena through an agreement with the Suwon city government; the team bought the naming rights and paid for the renovation while the city government retains ownership and supports its marketing efforts. Although the 2021–22 season began poorly, with a loss against Wonju DB Promy, KT Sonicboom embarked on a nine-game winning streak in November and December. The last time KT Sonicboom had won this many consecutive games was during the 2009–10 season. On March 27, KT Sonicboom defeated Changwon LG Sakers to secure the second place in the regular season, automatically qualifying for the semifinal stage of the playoffs for the first time since the 2010–11 season.

== Team names ==
- 1997–1999: Gwangju Nasan Flamans
- 1999–2000: Gwangju Goldbank Clickers
- 2000–2001: Yeosu Goldbank Clickers
- 2001–2003: Yeosu Korea Tender Purmi
- 2003: Busan Korea Tender Maxten
- 2003–2009: Busan KTF Magic Wings
- 2009–2021: Busan KT Sonicboom
- 2021–present: Suwon KT Sonicboom

== Current roster ==
Note: Flags indicate national team eligibility at FIBA-sanctioned events. Players may hold other non-FIBA nationalities not displayed.

Suwon KT Sonicboom roster
Players
Coaches

Pos.	No.	Nat.	Name	Ht.	Wt.	Age
C	0	(South Korea)	Ha Yun-gi	2.04 m (6 ft 8 in)		27 – 12 March 1999
SF	1	(South Korea)	Han Hui-won	1.95 m (6 ft 5 in)		33 – 1 May 1993
G	2	(South Korea)	Heo Hoon (C)	1.80 m (5 ft 11 in)		31 – 16 August 1995
SF	3	(South Korea)	Lee Yoon-gi	1.89 m (6 ft 2 in)		28 – 7 November 1997
G	4	(South Korea)	Choi Chang-jin	1.85 m (6 ft 1 in)		33 – 22 June 1993
G	5	(South Korea)	Choi Jin-gwang	1.75 m (5 ft 9 in)		29 – 3 June 1997
SF	6	(South Korea)	Lee Doo-ho	1.90 m (6 ft 3 in)		25 – 6 July 2001
SG	7	(South Korea)	Park Seon-woong	1.87 m (6 ft 2 in)		26 – 8 June 2000
G	8	(South Korea)	Park Sung-jae	1.83 m (6 ft 0 in)		24 – 13 March 2002
SF	10	(South Korea)	Moon Seong-gon	1.96 m (6 ft 5 in)		33 – 9 May 1993
G	11	(South Korea)	Lee Hyun-seok	1.90 m (6 ft 3 in)		33 – 15 December 1992
SF	12	(South Korea)	Moon Jeong-hyeon	1.94 m (6 ft 4 in)		25 – 30 July 2001
PF	13	(United States)	Rayshaun Hammonds (I)	2.00 m (6 ft 7 in)		28 – 10 November 1997
G	17	(South Korea)	Kim Jae-hyun	1.90 m (6 ft 3 in)		25 – 17 April 2001
G	20	(South Korea)	Lee Ho-jun	1.83 m (6 ft 0 in)		27 – 9 November 1998
C	21	(South Korea)	Lee Doo-won	2.04 m (6 ft 8 in)		26 – 20 August 2000
G	22	(South Korea)	Cho Hwan-hee	1.82 m (6 ft 0 in)		24 – 7 May 2002
PF	23	(South Korea)	Park Jun-young	1.95 m (6 ft 5 in)		30 – 21 June 1996
SG	25	(South Korea)	Ko Chan-hyuk	1.84 m (6 ft 0 in)		25 – 25 May 2001
C		(Slovenia)	Jordan Morgan (I)	2.04 m (6 ft 8 in)		35 – 15 September 1991

Head coach

- (South Korea) Song Young-jin

Assistant coach(es)

- (South Korea) Park Ji-hyun
- (South Korea) Park Jong-chun
- (South Korea) Kim Young-hwan

Legend

- (C) Team captain
- (I) Import player
- Injured

- Roster
Updated: 18 November 2024

== Honours ==
- Korean Basketball League championship

Runners-up: 2006–07, 2023–24

- Korean Basketball League regular season

Winners: 2010–11
Runners-up: 2009–10, 2021–22

- KBL Cup

Winners: 2022
Runners-up: 2024
