= Changwon LG Sakers =

Basketball team in South Gyeongsang, South Korea

- League: Korean Basketball League
- Established: 1994; 32 years ago
- History: LG Semiconductor Basketball Team; 1994–1997; Gyeongnam LG Sakers; 1997–1998; Changwon LG Sakers; 1998–present
- Arena: Changwon Gymnasium (Capacity: 6,000)
- Location: Changwon, Gyeongsangnam-do
- Team colours: Maroon, yellow, white
- Team manager: Han Sang-uk
- Head coach: Cho Sang-hyun
- Team captain: Heo Il-young
- Ownership: Cho Joo-wan
- Affiliation: LG
- Championships: 1 Korean League
- Website: sakers.kbl.or.kr
Home	Away

Changwon LG Sakers (Korean: 창원 LG 세이커스) are a professional basketball team located in the city of Changwon in South Gyeongsang Province, South Korea. They play in the Korean Basketball League (KBL), and their home arena is Changwon Gymnasium which has a capacity for approximately 6,000 people. The team's main sponsor is LG Electronics.

The team was established in 1997 under the name Gyeongnam LG Sakers. The name was changed to the Changwon LG Sakers after the first season.

In 2024–25, the Sakers won their first KBL championship following a 4–3 win over the Seoul SK Knights in the finals.

== Season by season ==
Year	Regular season			Playoffs
Year	Position	Won	Lost	Playoffs
1997–98	2nd	28	17	Semifinals
1998–99	5th	25	20	First round
1999–2000	7th	20	25	Did not qualify
2000–01	2nd	30	15	Runners-up
2001–02	5th	28	26	Semifinals
2002–03	2nd	38	16	Semifinals
2003–04	6th	28	26	Semifinals
2004–05	9th	17	37	Did not qualify
2005–06	8th	26	28	Did not qualify
2006–07	2nd	32	22	Semifinals
2007–08	6th	29	25	First round
2008–09	5th	29	25	First round
2009–10	4th	34	20	First round
2010–11	5th	28	26	First round
2011–12	7th	21	33	Did not qualify
2012–13	8th	20	34	Did not qualify
2013–14	1st	40	14	Runners-up
2014–15	4th	32	22	Semifinals
2015–16	8th	21	33	Did not qualify
2016–17	8th	23	31	Did not qualify
2017–18	9th	17	37	Did not qualify
2018–19	3rd	30	24	Semifinals
2019–20 (Note: The 2019–20 season was cut short due to the COVID-19 pandemic in South Korea.)	9th	16	26	Not held
2020–21	10th	19	35	Did not qualify
2021–22	7th	24	30	Did not qualify
2022–23	2nd	36	18	Semifinals
2023–24	2nd	36	18	Semifinals
2024–25	2nd	34	20	Champions
2025–26	1st	36	18	Semifinals

== Honours ==
=== Domestic ===
- Korean Basketball League championship

Winners (1): 2024–25
Runners-up (2): 2000–01, 2013–14

- Korean Basketball League regular season

Winners (2): 2013–14, 2025–26
Runners-up (7): 1997–98, 2000–01, 2002–03, 2006–07, 2022–23, 2023–24, 2024–25

- KBL Pro-Am

Runners-up (1): 2016

=== Continental ===
- ABA Club Championship

Winners (2): 2012, 2013
