= Charles Johnson =

Charles, Charlie or Charley Johnson may refer to:

== Academics ==
- Charles Johnson (historian) (1870-1961), English historian and archivist
- Charles Willison Johnson (1863–1932), American naturalist
- Charles S. Johnson (1893–1956), African-American sociologist president of Fisk University
- Charles R. Johnson (born 1948), African-American scholar and author
- Charles Royal Johnson (born 1948), professor of mathematics
- Charles Willis Johnson, dean of the University of Washington Pharmacy Department
- A. T. Charlie Johnson, American physicist

== Arts and entertainment ==
- Charles Johnson (writer) (1679–1748), English playwright and poet
- Captain Charles Johnson, pseudonym of unknown English author of 1724 book, A General History of the Robberies and Murders of the Most Notorious Pyrates
- Charles Ellis Johnson (1857–1926), American photographer
- Charles Howard Johnson (1868–1896), American illustrator and newspaper artist
- Charles L. Johnson (1876–1950), composer of ragtime tunes
- Charlie Johnson (bandleader) (1891–1959), jazz musician and pianist
- Charles Johnson (1903–1974), American actor who used stage name Chubby Johnson
- Little Jody Rainwater (born Charles Edward Johnson, 1920–2011), bluegrass musician and radio personality
- Charles K. Johnson (1924–2001), American promoter and president of Flat Earth Society, 1972–2001
- Charlie Johnson, stage name of rock singer Charles Westover (1934–1990), a.k.a. Del Shannon
- Charles Foster Johnson (born 1953), jazz guitarist, blogger at Little Green Footballs
- Charlee Johnson, American drummer, guitarist and songwriter

== Politics ==
- Charles Johnson (North Carolina politician) (died 1802), Democratic-Republican politician who represented 8th congressional district
- Charles Johnson (Pennsylvania politician) (1855–1937), American politician from Pennsylvania
- Charles C. Johnson (born 1988), white supremacist activist and website operator
- Charles E. Johnson (government official) (born 1936), acting U.S. Secretary of Health and Human Services from January 2004 to April 2004
- Charles Elliott Johnson, Democratic Party politician from North Carolina; member of the General Assembly from 2003 to 2005
- Charles F. Johnson (1859–1930), Democratic Party politician from Maine, U.S. senator, and judge
- Charles G. Johnson (1880–1957), Californian state treasurer from 1923 to 1956
- Charles George Johnson (1886–1950), chemist, businessman, and political figure in Adelaide, South Australia
- Charles H. Johnson, member of the Californian state assembly from 1861 to 1862
- Charles Phillip Johnson (1836–1920), lieutenant governor of Missouri from 1873 to 1875
- Charles R. Johnson (California merchant) (1830–1904), American merchant and Los Angeles City Council member
- Charles W. Johnson (jurist) (born 1951), associate chief justice of Washington State Supreme Court
- Charles William Johnson, Canadian politician
- Charles C. Johnson (politician) (born 1864), Michigan state representative
- Charles R. Johnson Jr. (born 1894), Florida state representative

== Sports ==
=== American football ===
- Charles Johnson (arena football) (born 1983)
- Charles Johnson (defensive back) (born 1956), San Francisco 49ers and St. Louis Cardinals
- Charles Johnson (defensive end) (born 1986), Carolina Panthers
- Charlie Johnson (defensive tackle) (1952–2021), American NFL player
- Charles Johnson (defensive tackle) (born 1957), Green Bay Packers
- Charlie Johnson (offensive lineman) (born 1984), American football guard
- Charley Johnson (1938–2024), American football quarterback
- Charles Johnson (wide receiver, born 1972) (1972–2022) Pittsburgh Steelers
- Charles Johnson (wide receiver, born 1989), Orlando Apollos
- Chuck Johnson (American football) (Charles Ray Johnson Jr., born 1969), American football offensive lineman
- Chuckie Johnson (Charles Lewis Johnson, born 1969), American football defensive tackle

=== Baseball ===
- Charlie Johnson (baseball) (1885–1940), outfielder for Philadelphia Phillies
- Charles Johnson (pitcher) (1909–2006), Negro leagues pitcher and outfielder
- Charles Johnson (catcher) (born 1971), 4 time Gold Glove Award catcher

=== Basketball ===
- Charles Johnson (basketball, born 1949) (1949–2007), American basketball player
- Charles Johnson (basketball, born 1961) (born 1964), American basketball player and coach
- Splinter Johnson (Charles Robert Johnson, 1920–2002), American basketball player

=== Other sports ===
- Charley Johnson (wrestler) (1887–1967), American wrestler
- Charles Johnson (cricketer) (died 1967), South African cricketer
- Charles Johnson (diver) (1913–2000), British diver
- Charles Johnson (fighter) (born 1991), American mixed martial artist and boxer
- Charlie Johnson (footballer) (1884–1954), English footballer

== Other ==
- Charles Johnson (Royal Navy officer) (1869–1930), became Admiral Superintendent of Malta Dockyard
- Charles Christopher Johnson, British soldier
- Charles E. Johnson (FBI Most Wanted fugitive) (1907–?), American criminal
- Charles B. Johnson (born 1933), American businessman, co-chairman of Franklin Resources, owner of San Francisco Giants
- Charles R. Johnson (soldier) (1932–1953), Medal of Honor recipient
- Charlie Johnson (pilot) (born 1942), Air force pilot, former president of Cessna Aircraft
- Charles Cooper Johnson (1827–1905), British Indian Army officer
- Charles Johnson (Tennessee) (1830–1863), son of U.S. president Andrew Johnson
- Charles E. Johnson Jr. (born 1961/1962), American founder of PurchasePro, convicted of fraud
- Charles A. Johnson (Oklahoma judge) (1931–2023), judge of the Oklahoma Court of Criminal Appeals

== See also ==
- Johnson Charles (born 1989), West Indies cricketer
- Charles Johnson Maynard (1845–1929), American naturalist, ornithologist, collector and taxidermist
- People with the surname Johnson
- Chuck Johnson (disambiguation)
- Charles Johnston (disambiguation)
- Charles Johnstone (disambiguation)
