= Charles E. Johnson =

Charles E. Johnson may refer to:

- Charles E. Johnson (FBI Most Wanted fugitive), American criminal
- Charles E. Johnson (government official), American public official, acting Secretary of Health and Human Services from January 2009 to April 2009
- Charles E. Johnson, early 1890s music/dance performer
- Charles E. Johnson, former president of Arkansas Baptist College
- Charles Elliott Johnson, Democratic member of the North Carolina General Assembly, 2003–2004
- Charles Ellis Johnson (1857–1926), American photographer
- Charles Johnson (wide receiver, born 1972) (Charles Everett Johnson), American football player
- Charles Ellicott Johnson, interim president of the University of Oregon
- Charles Eric Johnson, co-writer of The Monkey Hustle
- Charles E. Johnson Jr. (born 1961/1962), American founder of PurchasePro, convicted of fraud

== See also ==
- Charles Johnson (disambiguation)
- Johnson (surname)
