= Charles R. Johnson (disambiguation) =

Charles R. Johnson is an American scholar and author.

Charles R. Johnson may also refer to:

- Charles R. Johnson (California merchant)
- Charles R. Johnson (soldier), United States Army soldier and Medal of Honor recipient
- Charles R. Johnson Jr., member of the Florida House of Representatives
- Charles Royal Johnson, American mathematician

== See also ==
- Charles Johnson (disambiguation)
