= 2017 World Masters Athletics Indoor Championships =

Coordinates: 35.82828°N 128.676795°E

- Dates: 19–25 March 2017
- Host city: Daegu, South Korea
- Venue: Daegu Athletics Promotion Center
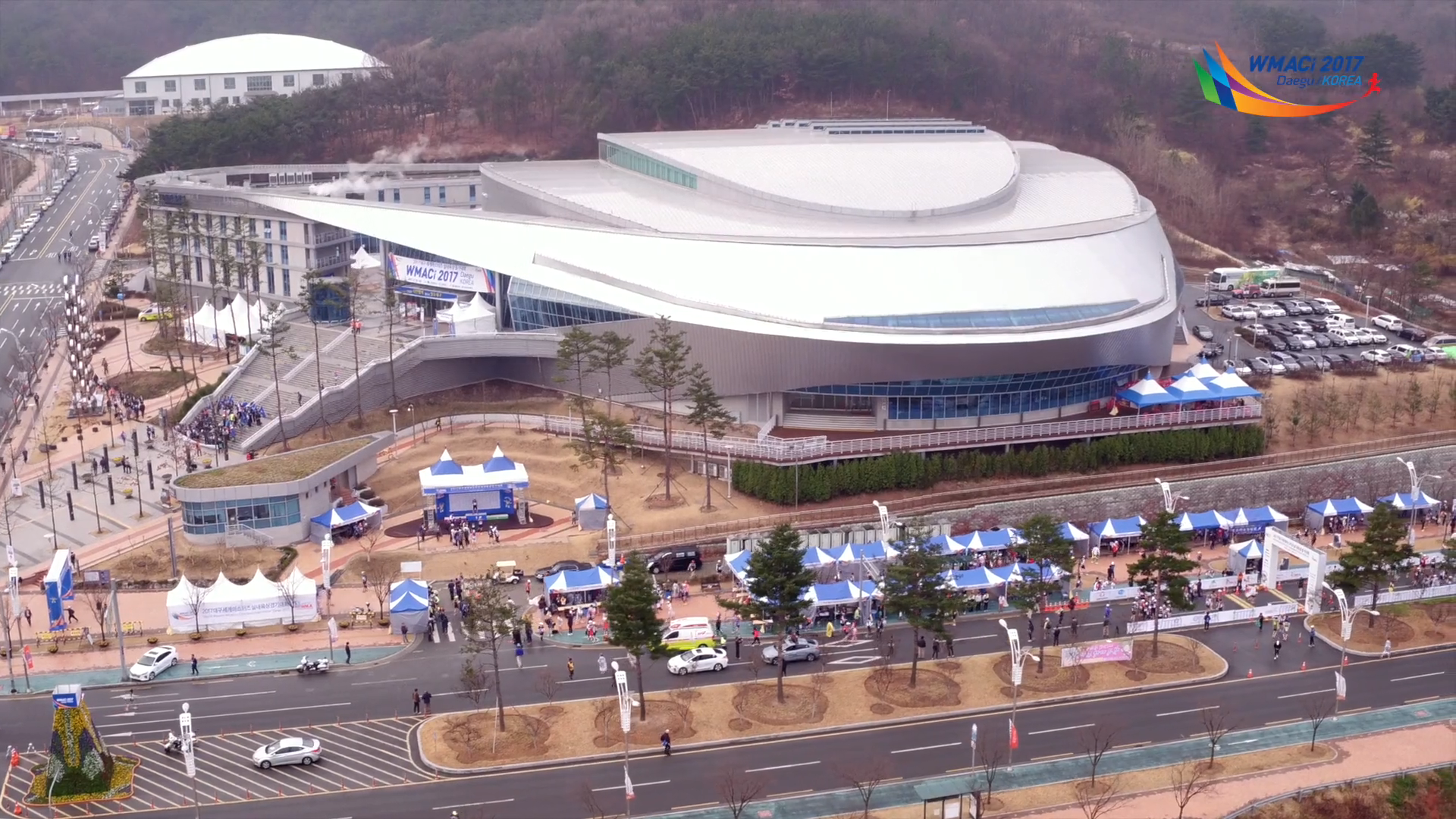
- Level: Masters
- Type: Indoor
- Participation: 4,364 athletes from 74 nations
- Official website: Archived 2017-03-23 at the Wayback Machine

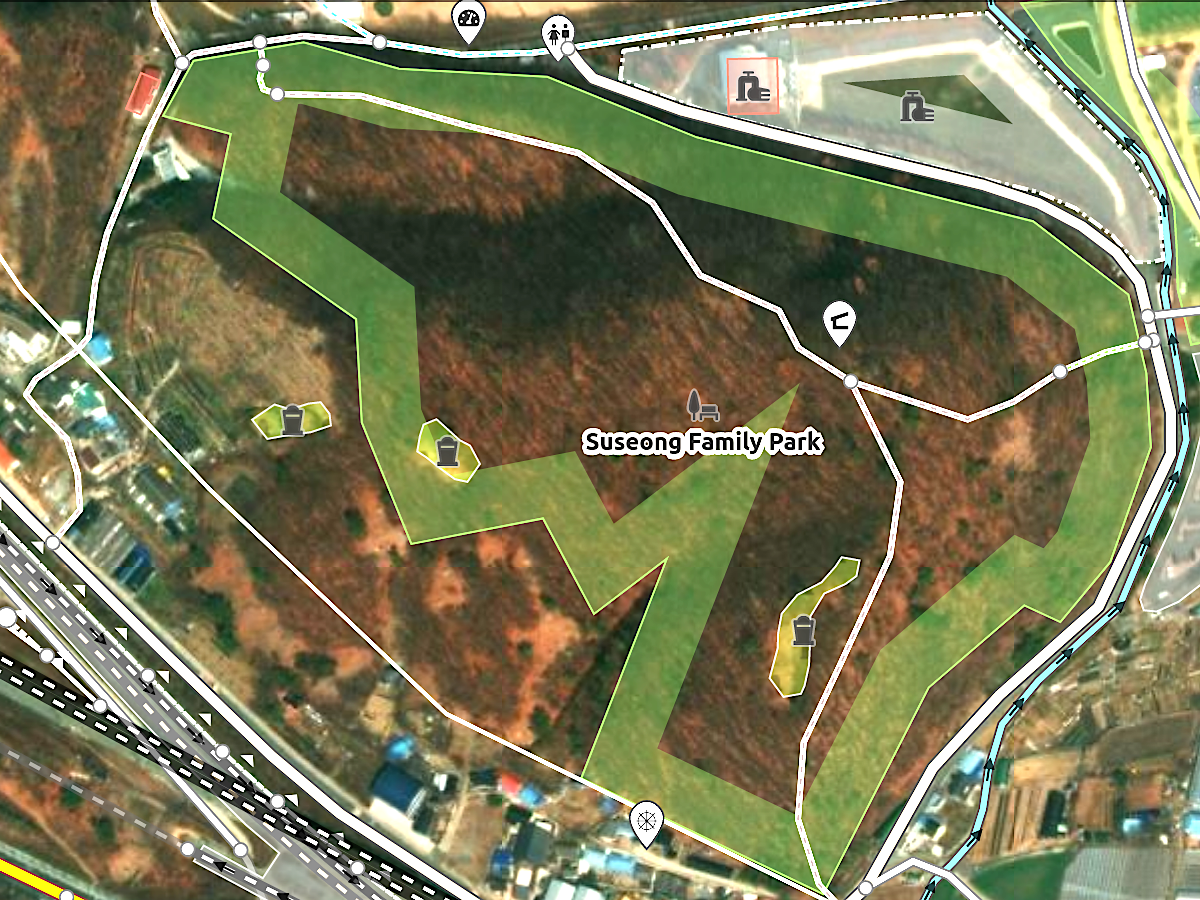
Suseong Family Park

2017 World Masters Athletics Indoor Championships is the seventh in a series of World Masters Athletics Indoor Championships (also called World Masters Athletics Championships Indoor, or WMACi). This seventh edition took place in Daegu, South Korea, from 19 to 25 March 2017. This was the first Indoor Championships held in an odd-numbered year, to alternate with the Outdoor Championships that switched to even-numbered years in 2016.

The main venue was Daegu Athletics Promotion Center, which has a banked indoor track where the turns are raised to neutralize the centrifugal force of athletes running the curves. This track has no bounce even on the high curves, as is often found in older portable tracks. Supplemental venues included Civil Life Sports Center, Daegu Stadium Auxiliary Field for throws, and Suseong Family Park for Cross Country.

This Championships was organized by World Masters Athletics (WMA) in coordination with a Local Organising Committee (LOC): Kwon Young (Mayor of Daegu), Daegu Metropolitan City, Korean Olympic Committee, Korea Association of Athletics Federations and Daegu Sports Council. A record total of 4,364 athletes from 74 countries competed.

The WMA is the global governing body of the sport of athletics for athletes 35 years of age or older, setting rules for masters athletics competition.

A full range of indoor track and field events were held. In addition to indoor competition, non-stadia events included Half Marathon, 8K Cross Country, 10K Race Walk, Weight Throw, Hammer throw, Discus Throw and Javelin Throw.

== Controversy ==
China boycotted this Championships due to political tension with South Korea.

== World Records ==
Official daily results are archived at simplyregister.net Past Championships results are archived at WMA. Additional archives are available from European Masters Athletics as a searchable pdf, and from British Masters Athletic Federation as a searchable pdf. USATF Masters keeps a list of American record holders. Canadian Masters Athletics keeps an archive of Canadian athletes and results at WMA Championships.

Several masters world records were set at this Indoor Championships. World records for 2017 are from WMA unless otherwise noted.

=== Women ===
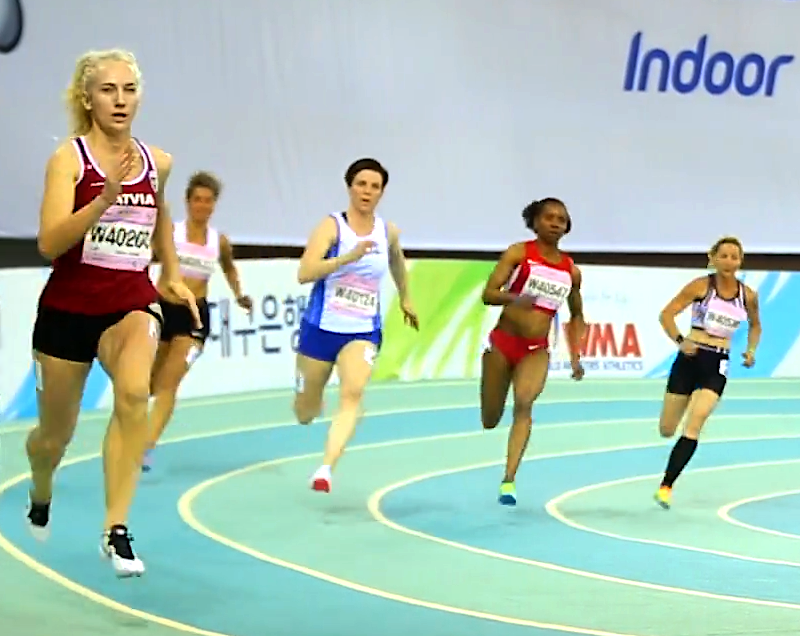
W40 200 Meters

Event	Athlete(s)	Nationality	Performance
W40 800 Meters	Louise Rudd	GBR	2:17.05
W40 1500 Meters	Louise Rudd	GBR	4:39.35
W65 400 Meters	Jeanette Flynn	AUS	1:10.34
W65 1500 Meters	Kathryn Martin	USA	5:25.29
W65 3000 Meters	Kathryn Martin	USA	11:35.98
W70 3000 Meters	Lavinia Petrie	AUS	12:54.89
W60 60 Meters Hurdles	Jane Horder	GBR	9.90
W80 Long Jump	Christa Bortignon	CAN	3.17
W50 Triple Jump	Valentyna Krepkina	UKR	10.79
W65 Triple Jump	Akiko Ohinata	JPN	9.86
W80 Triple Jump	Christa Bortignon on YouTube	CAN	7.09
W75 Weight Throw	Gudrun Mellmann	GER	14.34
W65 3000 Meters Race Walk	Heather Carr	AUS	16:57.96
W90 3000 Meters Race Walk	Elena Pagu	ROU	28:37.92
W45 Half Marathon	Esther Alvarez Herrero	ESP	1:19:54

=== Men ===
Event	Athlete(s)	Nationality	Performance
M85 60 Meters	Hiroo Tanaka	JPN	9.77
M80 200 Meters	Robert Lida	USA	29.15
M85 200 Meters	Hiroo Tanaka	JPN	33.76
M50 400 Meters	Roland Gröger on YouTube	GER	51.73
M80 400 Meters	Robert Lida	USA	1:10.20
M65 3000 Meters Race Walk	José Luis López Camarena	MEX	14:17.97
M65 Long Jump	Klemens Grißmer	GER	5.48
M65 Pentathlon	Klemens Grißmer	GER	4637
M65 4 x 200 Meters Relay	Charles Allie, Thaddeus Wilson, Charles Powell, Bill Collins	USA	1:48.58
