= 2012 Iowa Barnstormers season =

Arena Football League team season

- Head coach: Mike Hohensee
- Home stadium: Wells Fargo Arena

Results
- Record: 7–11
- Division place: 3rd NC Central
- Playoffs: Did not qualify

The 2012 Iowa Barnstormers season was the 12th season for the franchise, and the eighth in the Arena Football League. The team was coached by Mike Hohensee. The Barnstormers played their home games at Wells Fargo Arena. The Barnstormers finished the season 7–11 and failed to qualify for the playoffs.

== Offseason ==
=== Free Agency ===
Iowa Barnstormers Free Agency
Position	Player	2011 Team	2012 Team
OL	BJ Cambbell	???	Iowa Barnstormers
LB	Darnell Carter	Rookie F/A	Iowa Barnstormers
QB	JJ Raterink	Chicago Rush	Iowa Barnstormers
OL/DL	Darnell Whitley	???	Iowa Barnstormers
WR	Deryn Bowser	???	Iowa Barnstormers
FB	Brian Holley	???	Iowa Barnstormers
QB	Taharqa Rasshan	???	Iowa Barnstormers
DB	Cameron McGlenn	Iowa Barnstormers	Iowa Barnstormers
OL/DL	Cornelius Lewis	???	Iowa Barnstormers

== Standings ==
Central Division
Team	W	L	PCT	PF	PA	DIV	CON	Home	Away
z-San Antonio Talons	14	4	.778	1042	949	5–1	9–4	8–1	6–3
Chicago Rush	10	8	.556	1047	1044	4–2	5–6	7–2	3–6
Iowa Barnstormers	7	11	.389	948	1032	3–3	5–9	4–5	3–6
Kansas City Command	3	15	.167	705	938	0–6	1–12	2–7	1–8

z - Clinched division and conference's best record

== Schedule ==
The Barnstormers began the season on the road against the Spokane Shock on March 12. Their first home game of the season was against the Utah Blaze on March 17. They hosted the San Antonio Talons on July 21 in their final regular season game.

Week	Day	Date	Kickoff	Opponent	Results		Location	Report
Week	Day	Date	Kickoff	Opponent	Score	Record	Location	Report
1	Monday	March 12	9:00 PM	at Spokane Shock	W 69–63 (OT)	1–0	Spokane Veterans Memorial Arena	
2	Saturday	March 17	7:05 PM	Utah Blaze	L 49–69	1–1	Wells Fargo Arena	
3	Bye							
4	Saturday	March 31	7:05 PM	Chicago Rush	L 61–62 (OT)	1–2	Wells Fargo Arena	
5	Friday	April 6	6:30 PM	at Pittsburgh Power	W 55–42	2–2	Consol Energy Center	
6	Saturday	April 14	7:05 PM	Arizona Rattlers	W 56–54	3–2	Wells Fargo Arena	
7	Friday	April 20	8:00 PM	at Utah Blaze	L 62–63	3–3	EnergySolutions Arena	
8	Saturday	April 28	7:05 PM	San Jose SaberCats	L 33–76	3–4	Wells Fargo Arena	
9	Sunday	May 6	4:00 PM	at Chicago Rush	L 50–61	3–5	Allstate Arena	
10	Saturday	May 12	7:05 PM	Kansas City Command	W 62–42	4–5	Wells Fargo Arena	
11	Saturday	May 19	6:00 PM	at Jacksonville Sharks	L 19–55	4–6	Jacksonville Veterans Memorial Arena	
12	Friday	May 25	7:05 PM	Spokane Shock	L 62–68	4–7	Wells Fargo Arena	
13	Friday	June 1	7:00 PM	Cleveland Gladiators	W 70–62	5–7	Wells Fargo Arena	
14	Saturday	June 9	9:00 PM	at Arizona Rattlers	L 48–55	5–8	US Airways Center	
15	Saturday	June 16	7:00 PM	at San Antonio Talons	L 35–57	5–9	Alamodome	
16	Bye							
17	Saturday	June 30	7:05 PM	Pittsburgh Power	L 49–56	5–10	Wells Fargo Arena	
18	Saturday	July 7	7:00 PM	at Kansas City Command	W 54–27	6–10	Sprint Center	
19	Saturday	July 14	9:00 PM	at San Jose SaberCats	L 48–57	6–11	HP Pavilion at San Jose	
20	Saturday	July 21	7:05 PM	San Antonio Talons	W 66–63	7–11	Wells Fargo Arena	

== Roster ==
2012 Iowa Barnstormers roster
Quarterbacks: 14 Chris Dieker; 11 J. J. Raterink; Fullbacks: 34 Rodney Filer; Wide receivers: 1 Darius Reynolds; 22 Jesse Schmidt; 2 Collin Taylor; 3 Marco Thomas	Offensive linemen: 79 Mike Garrity; 77 Charles Johnson; 60 Alex Linnenkohl; 70 Jayson Palmgren; 72 Dace Richardson; Defensive linemen: 30 Darnell Carter; 44 Rodney Gnat; 9 Mantangi Tonga	Linebackers: 57 David Beford; 32 Peter Buck; Defensive backs: 12 Ter'Ran Benton; 20 Cameron McGlenn; 6 Jason Simpson; 21 Brian Peters; Kickers: 7 Craig Camay	Injury Reserve: Currently vacant; Refused to report: Currently vacant; League Suspension: Currently vacant; Team Suspension: Currently vacant; Recallable reassignment: Currently vacant; Rookies in italics; Roster updated July 23, 2012; 22 Active, 0 Inactive
