= KBL All-Star Game =

South Korean annual basketball event

- Status: Active
- Frequency: Annually
- Inaugurated: 1998
- Most recent: 2026
- Organizer: Korean Basketball League

The KBL All-Star Game is an annual basketball event in South Korea, organised by the Korean Basketball League. It was established in 1998 as the All-Star Game of the KBL. The KBL All-Star Game is held in mid-January every year. It was staged in Seoul in all but one of its first nineteen editions, and at venues around the country from 2017, before returning to Seoul in 2026.

== History ==
The All-Star Game was launched in January 1998. For the following eight editions all the games had been held at the Jamsil Arena in Seoul. The 2021 edition was scheduled for January 17, but it was cancelled due to COVID-19 despite the fact that the teams had been selected. The 2024 game went into overtime, the first All-Star game to do so in 22 years.

The 2026 edition, held at the Jamsil Arena, was the last All-Star game at the venue, which is due for demolition as part of the redevelopment of the Jamsil Sports Complex.

== Voting ==
From the league's founding in 1997 until 2001, the All-Star starting fives were chosen by a vote of the KBL press corps. Fan voting was introduced in the 2001–02 season, with fans selecting each team's starting five, and the KBL's technical committee choosing the remaining seven places on each team. Since 2017–18, all 24 All-Stars have been selected by fan vote, with the top two becoming captains who draft their teams. Five players from each of the ten teams are nominated for the fan vote, and the two leading vote-getters each recruit eleven players, regardless of their original teams.

Heo Ung topped the fan vote in three consecutive seasons, from 2021−22 to 2023−24, his fifth time as leading vote-getter; he had also led the vote in 2015−16.

== Editions ==
=== 1998-2016 ===
Year	Venue	City	MVP	Team
1998	Jamsil Arena	Seoul	(South Korea) Kang Dong-hee	Busan Kia Enterprise
1999	Jamsil Arena	Seoul	(United States) Warren Rosegreen	Incheon Shinsegi Bigs
2000	Jamsil Arena	Seoul	(United States) Warren Rosegreen (2)	Gwangju Nasan Flamans
2001	Jamsil Arena	Seoul	(United States) Artimus McClary	Seoul Samsung Thunders
2002	Jamsil Arena	Seoul	(United States) Andre Perry	Wonju Sambo Xers
2003	Jamsil Arena	Seoul	(United States) Marcus Hicks	Daegu Tongyang Orions
2004	Jamsil Arena	Seoul	(South Korea) Moon Kyung-eun	Incheon Electroland Black Slamer
2005	Jamsil Arena	Seoul	(United States) Charles Minlund	Jeonju KCC Egis
2006	Jamsil Arena	Seoul	(South Korea) Seo Jang-hoon	Seoul Samsung Thunders
2007	Dongchun Gymnasium	Ulsan	(South Korea) Cho Sang-hyun	Changwon LG Sakers
2008	Jamsil Students' Gymnasium	Seoul	(South Korea) Kim Joo-sung	Wonju East Promy
2009	Jamsil Students' Gymnasium	Seoul	(South Korea) Lee Dong-jun	Daegu Orions
2010	Jamsil Arena	Seoul	(United States) (South Korea) Eric Sandrin	Seoul Samsung Thunders
2011	Jamsil Arena	Seoul	(South Korea) Kim Hyo-beom	Seoul SK Knights
2012	Jamsil Arena	Seoul	(South Korea) Mun Tae-yeong	Changwon LG Sakers
2013	Jamsil Arena	Seoul	(United States) Juan Patillo	Anyang Jung Kwan Jang Red Boosters
2014	Jamsil Arena	Seoul	(South Korea) Kim Sun-hyung	Seoul SK Knights
2015	Jamsil Arena	Seoul	(South Korea) Kim Sun-hyung (South Korea) Mun Tae-yeong	Seoul SK Knights; Ulsan Mobis Phoebus
2016	Jamsil Arena	Seoul	(South Korea) Kim Sun-hyung (3)	Seoul SK Knights

=== 2017-present ===
Bold: Team that won the game.

Year	Date	Venue	City	Attendance	Team 1	Score	Team 2	MVP	Club
2017	January 22	Sajik Arena	Busan		Junior All Star	126–**150**	**Senior All Star**	(South Korea) Oh Se-keun	Anyang KGC
2018	January 14	Changwon Gymnasium	Changwon	5,422	Team Oh Se-keun	104–**117**	**Team Lee Jung-hyun**	(United States) Deonte Burton	Wonju DB Promy
2019	January 20	Changwon Gymnasium	Changwon	5,152	Yang Hong-seok Magic Team	103–**129**	**Ra Gun-a Dream Team**	(United States) Marcus Landry	Suwon KT Sonicboom
2020	January 19	Samsan World Gymnasium	Incheon	9,704	**Team Heo Hoon**	**123**–110	Team KBLmong	(South Korea) Kim Jong-kyu	Wonju DB Promy
2021	Cancelled due to COVID-19								
2022	January 16	Daegu Athletics Promotion Center	Daegu	3,300	**Team Heo Ung**	**120**–117	Team KBLmong	(South Korea) Heo Ung	Wonju DB Promy
2023	January 15	Suwon KT Sonicboom Arena	Suwon	3,325	Team Heo Ung	117–**122**	**Team Lee Dae-sung**	(South Korea) Ha Yoon-gi	Suwon KT Sonicboom
2024	January 14	Goyang Gymnasium	Goyang	5,581	**Team Gong-Aji**	**135**–128 (OT)	Team KBLmong	(United States) Jameel Warney	Seoul SK Knights
2025	January 19	Sajik Arena	Busan	9,053	Team Gong-Aji	126–**142**	**Team KBLmong**	(United States) Jameel Warney (2)	Seoul SK Knights
2026	January 18	Jamsil Arena	Seoul	8,649	**Team Brown**	**131**–109	Team Cony	(United States) Nathan Knight	Goyang Sono Skygunners

=== Players with most MVP awards ===
Player	Wins	Editions
(South Korea) Kim Sun-hyung	3	2014, 2015, 2016
(United States) Jameel Warney	2	2024, 2025
(South Korea) Mun Tae-yeong	2	2012, 2015
(United States) Warren Rosegreen	2	1999, 2000

== All-Star Game events ==
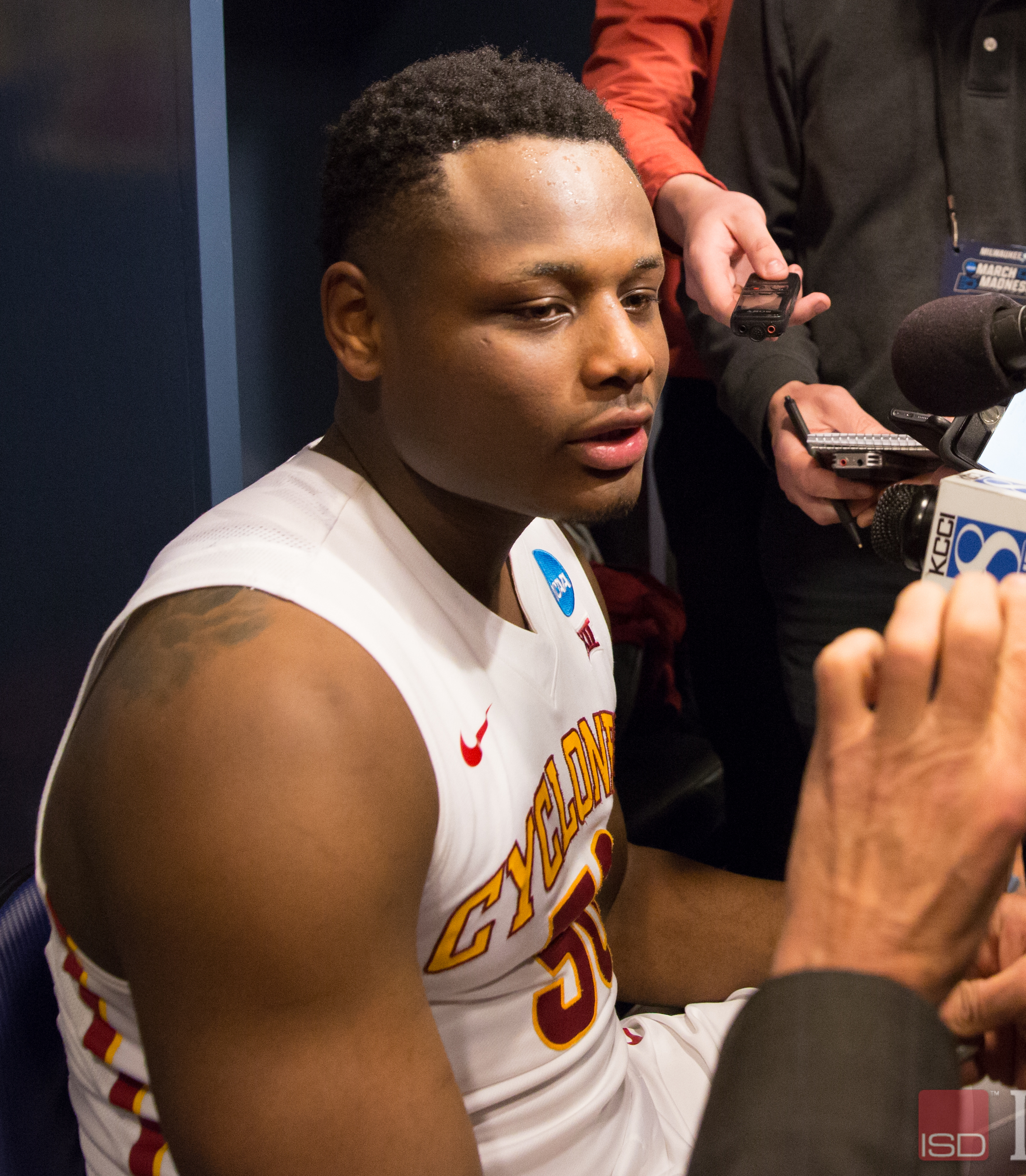
Former Sacramento Kings player Deonte Burton was named the MVP in 2018.

=== Three-Point Shoot Contest ===
Year	Player	Team
2017	(South Korea) Jeon Jun-beom	Ulsan Hyundai Mobis Phoebus
2018	(South Korea) Jeon Jun-beom	Ulsan Hyundai Mobis Phoebus
2019	(South Korea) Cho Sung-min	Changwon LG Sakers
2020	(South Korea) Choi Jun-yong	Seoul SK Knights
2022	(South Korea) Lee Kwan-hee	Changwon LG Sakers
2023	(South Korea) Heo Ung	Jeonju KCC Egis
2024	(Philippines) Justin Gutang	Seoul Samsung Thunders
2025	(South Korea) Choi Seong-mo	Seoul Samsung Thunders

=== Slam-Dunk champions ===
Year	Player	Team
2017	(United States) Michael Craig (South Korea) Kim Hyun-min	Seoul Samsung Thunders; Busan KT SonicBoom
2018	(United States) Deonte Burton (South Korea) Kim Min-soo	Wonju DB Promy; Seoul SK Knights
2019	(South Korea) Kim Jong-kyu	Changwon LG Sakers
2020	(United States) Troy Gillenwater (South Korea) Kim Hyun-min	Incheon Electroland Elephants; Busan KT SonicBoom
2022	(South Korea) Ha Yoon-gi	Suwon KT Sonicboom
2023	(Philippines) Rhenz Abando	Anyang KGC Ginseng Corporation
2024	(Philippines) Justin Gutang	Seoul Samsung Thunders
2025	(South Korea) Cho Jun-hee	Seoul Samsung Thunders

== All-Stars with most votes ==
Edition	Most votes	Runner-up
2017-18	(South Korea) Oh Se-keun	(South Korea) Lee Jung-hyun
2018-19	(South Korea) Yang Hong-seok	(United States) (South Korea) Ricardo Ratliffe
2019-20	(South Korea) Heo Hoon	(South Korea) Kim Si-rae
2021-22	(South Korea) Heo Ung	(South Korea) Heo Hoon
2022-23	(South Korea) Heo Ung	(South Korea) Lee Dae-sung
2023-24	(South Korea) Heo Ung	(South Korea) Heo Hoon
2024-25	(South Korea) Yu Ki-sang	(South Korea) Byeon Jun-hyeong

Under the format used since 2017–18.

== Notable participants ==
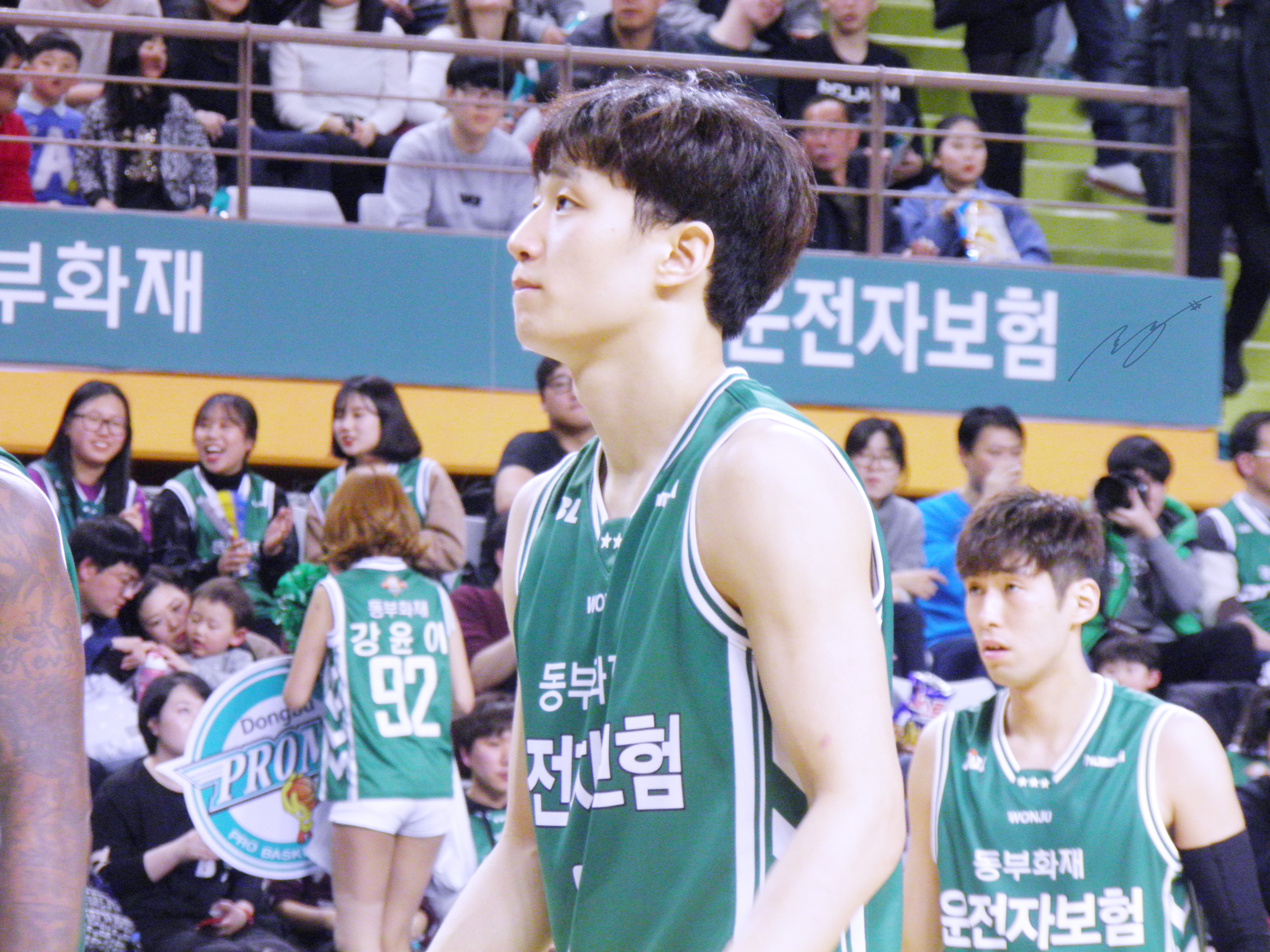
Heo Ung was named the MVP in 2022.

- (United States) (South Korea) Eric Sandrin
- (South Korea) Oh Se-keun
- (South Korea) Heo Ung
- (United States) Deonte Burton
- (Philippines) Rhenz Abando
- (Nigeria) Olumide Oyedeji
- (United States) Marcus Foster
- (United States) Kris Lang
- (United States) Anthony Richardson
- (United States) Marcus Landry

== See also ==
- Korean Basketball League
