= Chuck Johnson =

Chuck Johnson may refer to:

- Charles C. Johnson (born 1988), American far-right political activist
- Chuck Johnson (American football) (born 1969), American football offensive lineman
- Chuckie Johnson (born 1969), American football defensive tackle
- Chuck Johnson, a character in the TV series In Plain Sight

== See also ==
- Charles Johnson (disambiguation)
