= Charles Johnston =

Charles Johnston may refer to:

== Politics ==
- Charles Johnston (New York politician) (1793–1845), U.S. representative from New York
- Charles Clement Johnston (1795–1832), U.S. representative from Virginia
- Charles Johnston (New Zealand politician) (1845–1918), mayor of Wellington, New Zealand
- Sir Charles Johnston, 1st Baronet (1848–1933), lord mayor of London between 1914 and 1915
- Charles Edward Johnston (1899–1971), Canadian federal politician
- Charles Johnston (diplomat) (1912–1986), British diplomat and author who translated Pushkin's Eugene Onegin
- Charles Johnston, Baron Johnston of Rockport (1915–2002), British politician
- Charles Hampton Johnston (1919–1981), Scottish sheriff and Liberal Party politician

== Other ==
- Charles E. Johnston (1881–1951), president of Kansas City Southern Railway
- Charles H. Johnston (born 1948), U.S. admiral, retired 2005
- Charles Johnston (captive) (1770–1833), American lawyer who wrote a captivity narrative
- Charles Johnston (travel writer) (1812–1872), wrote about Abyssinia and founded the Durban Botanic Gardens
- Charles Johnston (priest) (1842–1925), archdeacon of Bombay
- Charles Johnston (theosophist) (1867–1931), author, translator and theosophist, served in the British Bengal Service
- Charles Johnston (umpire) (1896–1988), Major League Baseball umpire
- Charlie Johnston (Australian footballer) (1875–1950), Australian rules footballer
- Charlie Johnston (Scottish footballer) (1911–1991), Scottish footballer
- Charles Johnston (athlete) (1903–1999), British Olympic athlete

== See also ==
- Charles Johnstone (disambiguation)
- Charles Johnson (disambiguation)
