= List of Ateez concert tours =

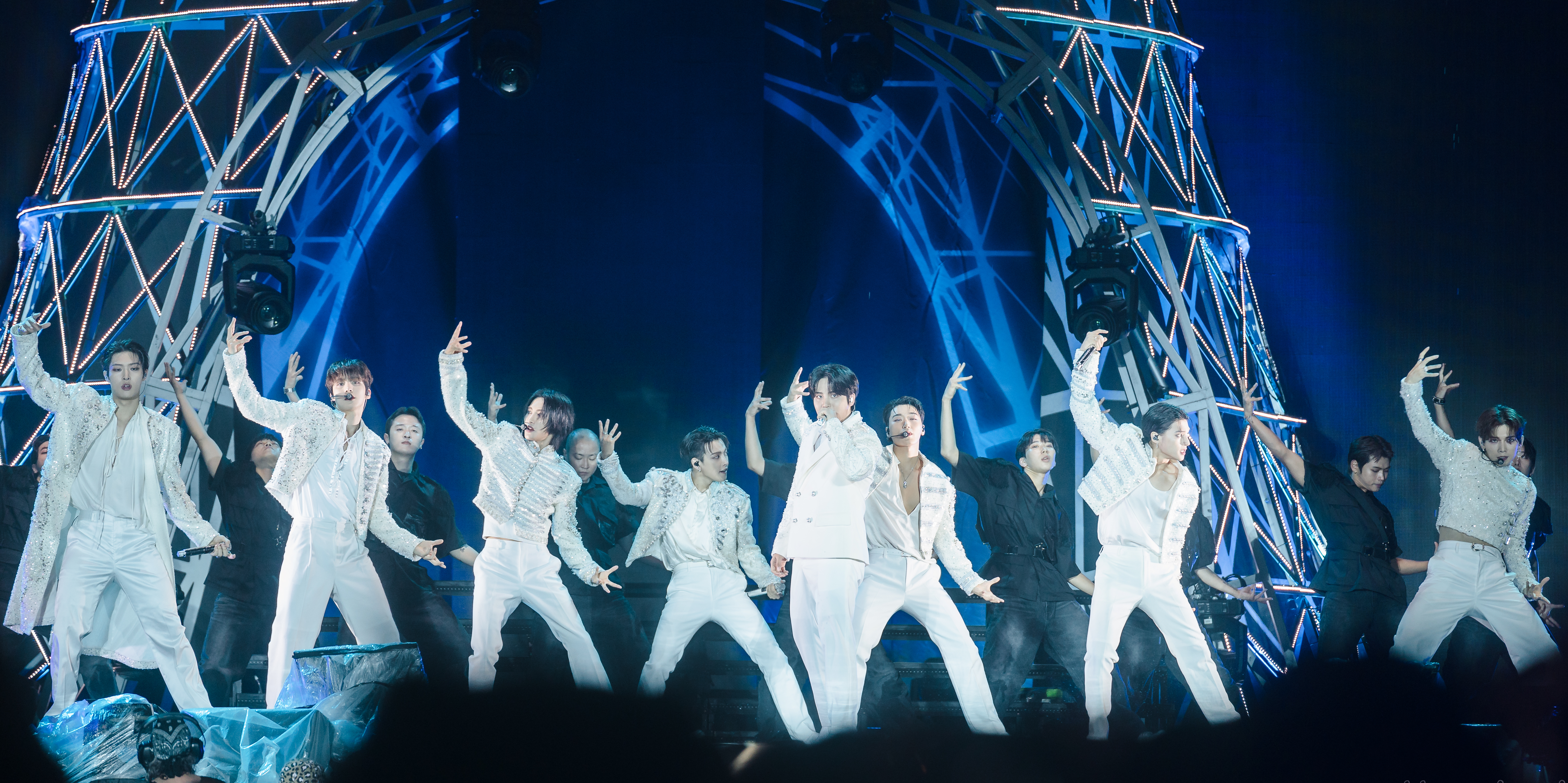
Ateez performing at their "Towards the Light: Will to Power" world tour in 2024

This is a list of concert tours and performances held by the South Korean boy group Ateez.

== The Expedition Tour ==
The Expedition Tour
- World tour by Ateez
- Location: North America; Europe; Australia
- Start date: March 15, 2019
- End date: August 11, 2019
- No. of shows: 17

Ateez concert chronology
- The Expedition Tour (2019); The Fellowship: Map The Treasure Tour (2020)

Concert dates
Date	City	Country	Venue
North America
March 15, 2019	Los Angeles	United States	Globe Theater
March 17, 2019	Dallas	United States	Granada Theater
March 20, 2019	Chicago	United States	The Vic Theatre
March 22, 2019	Atlanta	United States	Center Stage Theater
March 24, 2019	New York City	United States	Warsaw Concerts
Europe
April 3, 2019	London	England	O2 Forum Kentish Town
April 5, 2019	Lisbon	Portugal	Lisboa ao Vivo
April 7, 2019	Paris	France	Le Bataclan
April 9, 2019	Berlin	Germany	Astra Kulturhaus
April 12, 2019	Amsterdam	Netherlands	Q Factory
April 14, 2019	Milan	Italy	Magazzini Generali
April 16, 2019	Budapest	Hungary	Dürer Kert
April 18, 2019	Stockholm	Sweden	Fryshuset Klubben
April 19, 2019	Warsaw	Poland	Palladium
April 21, 2019	Moscow	Russia	Izvestia Hall
Oceania
August 9, 2019	Melbourne	Australia	Margaret Court Arena
August 11, 2019	Sydney	Australia	Big Top Sydney

== The Fellowship: Map The Treasure Tour ==
The Fellowship: Map The Treasure Tour
- World tour by Ateez
- Location: Asia; Europe; North America
- Start date: February 8, 2020
- End date: April 26, 2020 (scheduled)
- No. of shows: 18 (16 cancelled)

Ateez concert chronology
- The Expedition Tour (2019); The Fellowship: Map The Treasure Tour (2020); The Fellowship: Beginning of the End (2022)

Concert dates
Date	City	Country	Venue	Attendance
February 8, 2020	Seoul	South Korea	Seoul Olympic Hall	5,000
February 9, 2020	Seoul	South Korea	Seoul Olympic Hall	5,000

List of cancelled dates

Date	City	Country	Venue
Europe
March 14, 2020	Madrid	Spain	Palacio Vistalegre
March 17, 2020	Paris	France	AccorHotels Arena
March 20, 2020	London	England	The SSE Arena, Wembley
March 22, 2020	Amsterdam	Netherlands	AFAS Live
March 25, 2020	Berlin	Germany	Mercedes-Benz Arena
March 27, 2020	Warsaw	Poland	Warszawa Expo XXI
March 29, 2020	Moscow	Russia	Adrenaline Stadium
Asia
April 2, 2020	Osaka	Japan	Zepp Osaka Bayside
April 3, 2020	Osaka	Japan	Zepp Osaka Bayside
April 5, 2020	Tokyo	Japan	Zepp Tokyo
April 6, 2020	Tokyo	Japan	Zepp Tokyo
North America
April 17, 2020	Newark	United States	Prudential Center
April 19, 2020	Chicago	United States	Wintrust Arena
April 21, 2020	Atlanta	United States	Infinite Energy Center
April 23, 2020	Dallas	United States	The Theatre at Grand Prairie
April 26, 2020	Los Angeles	United States	The Forum

Set list
1. Win
2. Horizon
3. Pirate King
4. Twilight + Stay
5. My Way
6. Light
7. Mist
8. Desire
9. Illusion
10. Wave
11. Sunrise
12. If Without You
13. Aurora
14. Utopia
15. Say My Name
16. Dazzling Light
17. HALA HALA (Hearts Awakened, Live Alive)
18. Treasure + Precious
19. Wonderland
20. Answer
21. Thank U
22. Star 1117
23. Promise
24. Dancing Like Butterfly Wings

== The Fellowship: Beginning of the End ==
The Fellowship: Beginning of the End
- World tour by Ateez
- Location: Asia; North America; Europe
- Start date: January 7, 2022
- End date: July 18, 2022
- No. of shows: 20

Ateez concert chronology
- The Fellowship: Map The Treasure Tour (2020); The Fellowship: Beginning of the End (2022); The Fellowship: Break The Wall (2022-2023)

Concert dates
Date	City	Country	Venue	Attendance
Asia
January 7, 2022	Seoul	South Korea	Seoul Olympic Hall	6,000
January 8, 2022	Seoul	South Korea	Seoul Olympic Hall	6,000
January 9, 2022	Seoul	South Korea	Seoul Olympic Hall	6,000
North America
January 18, 2022	Chicago	United States	Wintrust Arena	70,000
January 20, 2022	Atlanta	United States	Gas South Arena	70,000
January 24, 2022	Newark	United States	Prudential Center	70,000
January 27, 2022	Dallas	United States	Texas Trust CU Theatre	70,000
January 30, 2022	Los Angeles	United States	The Forum	70,000
January 31, 2022	Los Angeles	United States	The Forum	70,000
Europe
April 23, 2022	Madrid	Spain	Palacio Vistalegre	74,000
April 24, 2022	Madrid	Spain	Palacio Vistalegre	74,000
April 30, 2022	London	England	OVO Arena, Wembley	74,000
May 1, 2022	London	England	OVO Arena, Wembley	74,000
May 4, 2022	Paris	France	Accor Arena	74,000
May 8, 2022	Berlin	Germany	Mercedes-Benz Arena	74,000
May 9, 2022	Berlin	Germany	Mercedes-Benz Arena	74,000
May 12, 2022	Amsterdam	Netherlands	AFAS Live	74,000
Asia
July 16, 2022	Yokohama	Japan	Pia Arena MM	30,000
July 17, 2022	Yokohama	Japan	Pia Arena MM	30,000
July 18, 2022	Yokohama	Japan	Pia Arena MM	30,000
Total				180,000

Set list
1. "Wonderland (Symphony No.9 'From the Wonderland')"
2. "Pirate King (Overload Mix)"
3. "Say My Name"
4. "Treasure"
5. "Precious"
6. "Utopia"
7. "Better (Korean Ver.)"
8. "Still Here (Korean Ver.)"
9. "Wave"
10. "Inception"
11. "Deja Vu"
12. "Take Me Home"
13. "Desire"
14. "Hala Hala (Hearts Awakened, Live Alive)"
15. "Answer"
16. "Declaration"
17. "Fireworks (I'm the One)"
18. "Good Lil Boy"
19. "The Leaders"
20. "To The Beat"
21. "Thanxx"
22. "Rocky"
23. "Intro + The Real (Heung Ver.)"

Encore

1. "Eternal Sunshine"
2. "Dancing Like Butterfly Wings"
3. "Star 1117"
4. "Turbulence"

== The Fellowship: Break The Wall ==
The Fellowship: Break The Wall
- World tour by Ateez
- Location: Asia; North America; Europe; Latin America
- Start date: October 29, 2022
- End date: September 16, 2023
- No. of shows: 40

Ateez concert chronology
- The Fellowship: Beginning of the End (2022); The Fellowship: Break The Wall (2022-2023); The Towards The Light: Will To Power (2024-2025)

Concert dates
Date	City	Country	Venue	Attendance
Asia
October 29, 2022	Seoul	South Korea	Jamsil Indoor Stadium	—
October 30, 2022	Seoul	South Korea	Jamsil Indoor Stadium	—
North America
November 5, 2022	Oakland	United States	Oakland Arena	110,000
November 7, 2022	Anaheim	United States	Honda Center	110,000
November 8, 2022	Anaheim	United States	Honda Center	110,000
November 10, 2022	Phoenix / Glendale	United States	Gila River Arena	110,000
November 16, 2022	Dallas / Fort Worth	United States	Dickies Arena	110,000
November 19, 2022	Chicago	United States	Wintrust Arena	110,000
November 21, 2022	Atlanta	United States	State Farm Arena	110,000
November 22, 2022	Atlanta	United States	State Farm Arena	110,000
November 27, 2022	Newark	United States	Prudential Center	110,000
November 28, 2022	Newark	United States	Prudential Center	110,000
December 2, 2022	Toronto / Hamilton	Canada	FirstOntario Centre	110,000
Asia				110,000
December 11, 2022	Chiba	Japan	Makuhari Messe	30,000
December 12, 2022	Chiba	Japan	Makuhari Messe	30,000
Europe
February 10, 2023	Amsterdam	Netherlands	Ziggo Dome	100,000
February 14, 2023	Berlin	Germany	Mercedes-Benz Arena	100,000
February 15, 2023	Berlin	Germany	Mercedes-Benz Arena	100,000
February 18, 2023	Brussels	Belgium	Palais 12	100,000
February 22, 2023	London	England	The O2 Arena	100,000
February 28, 2023	Madrid	Spain	Wizink Center	100,000
March 4, 2023	Copenhagen	Denmark	Royal Arena	100,000
March 7, 2023	Paris	France	Accor Arena	100,000
March 8, 2023	Paris	France	Accor Arena	100,000
Encores
April 28, 2023	Seoul	South Korea	Jamsil Indoor Stadium	—
April 29, 2023	Seoul	South Korea	Jamsil Indoor Stadium	—
May 2, 2023	Tokyo	Japan	Ariake Arena	—
May 3, 2023	Tokyo	Japan	Ariake Arena	—
May 6, 2023	Kobe	Japan	World Memorial Hall	—
May 7, 2023	Kobe	Japan	World Memorial Hall	—
Asia
July 8, 2023	Taipei	Taiwan	Taipei Nangang Exhibition Center	—
July 15, 2023	Chek Lap Kok	Hong Kong	Asiaworld-Expo	—
July 20, 2023	Jeddah	Saudi Arabia	Jeddah Super Dome	
August 5, 2023	Bangkok	Thailand	Impact Exhibition and Convention Center	—
Central and South America
August 23, 2023	Mexico City	Mexico	Arena CDMX	70,000
August 26, 2023	São Paulo	Brazil	Allianz Parque	70,000
August 30, 2023	Santiago	Chile	Movistar Arena	70,000
September 3, 2023	Bogota	Colombia	Coliseo Live	70,000
Asia
September 9, 2023	Singapore		Singapore Indoor Stadium	—
September 16, 2023	Manila	Philippines	Araneta Coliseum	—
Total				400,000

Note: The Glendale stop and the Hamilton stop are respectively noted as being in Phoenix and Toronto in the poster announcement.

Set list
1. “New World”
2. “Answer”
3. “Sector 1"
4. “The Ring”
5. “Hala Hala”
6. “Dazzling Light”
7. “Mist”
8. “Sunrise”
9. “My Way”
10. “Illusion”
11. “Wave”
12. “Win”
13. “Horizon”
14. “Say My Name”
15. “Cyberpunk”
16. “I’m the One” (Heat-topping version)
17. “Rocky”
18. “Wonderland”
19. “Guerrilla”
20. “Turbulence”
21. “Celebrate”
22. “From”
23. “The Real”

== Towards The Light: Will To Power ==
Towards The Light: Will To Power
- World tour by Ateez
- Location: Asia; North America; Europe
- Start date: January 27, 2024
- End date: March 23, 2025
- No. of shows: 33

Ateez concert chronology
- The Fellowship: Break The Wall (2022-2023); Towards The Light: Will To Power (2024-2025); In Your Fantasy (2025-2026)

Concert dates
Date	City	Country	Venue	Setlist	Attendance
Asia
January 27, 2024	Seoul	South Korea	Jamsil Indoor Stadium	1. "Crazy Form"; 2. "Say My Name" (Band Ver.); 3. "Win" (Band Ver.); 4. "This World"; 5. "Wake Up"; 6. "Guerrilla (Flag Ver.)"; 7. "Cyberpunk"; 8. "Deja Vu"; 9. "It's You"; 10. "Youth"; 11. "Everything"; 12. "Silver Light"; 13. "Wave"; 14. "Dancing Like Butterfly Wings"; 15. "Matz"; 16. "Arriba"; 17. "Django"; 18. "Bouncy (K-Hot Chilli Peppers)"; 19. "Wonderland (Symphony No. 9 "From The Wonderland"); 20. "Dreamy Day"; 21. "Eternal Sunshine"; 22. "Fireworks" (Band Ver.); 23. "The Real" (Band Ver.); 24. "Turbulence" (Orchestra Ver.); 25. "Utopia" (EDM Party Mix)	—
January 28, 2024	Seoul	South Korea	Jamsil Indoor Stadium		—
February 3, 2024	Saitama	Japan	Saitama Super Arena	1. "Crazy Form"; 2. "Say My Name" (Band Ver.); 3. "Win" (Band Ver.); 4. "This World"; 5. "Wake Up"; 6. "Guerrilla" (Flag Ver.); 7. "Cyberpunk" (Japanese Ver.); 8. "Deja Vu"; 9. "It's You"; 10. "Youth"; 11. "Everything"; 12. "Silver Light"; 13. "Wave"; 14. "Dancing Like Butterfly Wings"; 15. "Matz"; 16. "Arriba"; 17. "Django"; 18. "Bouncy (K-Hot Chilli Pepper)"; 19. "Wonderland" (Symphony No. 9 "From The Wonderland"); 20. "Dreamy Day"; 21. "Eternal Sunshine"; 22. "Fireworks" (Band Ver.); 23. "The Real" (Band Ver.); 24. "Turbulence" (Japanese/Orchestra Ver.); 25. "Utopia" (Japanese Ver./ EDM Party Mix)	34,000
February 4, 2024	Saitama	Japan	Saitama Super Arena		34,000
North America
July 14, 2024	Tacoma	United States	Tacoma Dome	1. "Crazy Form"; 2. "Say My Name" (Band Ver.); 3. "Win" (Band Ver.); 4. "This World"; 5. "Wake Up"; 6. "Guerrilla" (Flag Ver.); 7. "Cyberpunk"; 8. "Halazia"; 9. "It's You"; 10. "Youth"; 11. "Everything"; 12. "Silver Light"; 13. "Wave"; 14. "Dancing Like Butterfly Wings"; 15. "Matz"; 16. "Work"; 17. "Arriba"; 18. "Django"; 19. "Bouncy (K-Hot Chilli Peppers)"; 20. "Wonderland" (Symphony No. 9 "From The Wonderland"); 21. "Eternal Sunshine"; 22. "Fireworks" (Band Ver.); 23. "The Real" (Band Ver.); 24. "Turbulence" (Orchestra Ver.); 25. "Dreamy Day"; 26. "Utopia" (EDM Party Mix)	200,000
July 17, 2024	Oakland	United States	Oakland Arena		200,000
July 20, 2024	Los Angeles	United States	BMO Stadium		200,000
July 21, 2024	Los Angeles	United States	BMO Stadium		200,000
July 25, 2024	Phoenix	United States	Footprint Center		200,000
July 28, 2024	Arlington	United States	Globe Life Field		200,000
July 30, 2024	Duluth	United States	Gas South Arena		200,000
July 31, 2024	Duluth	United States	Gas South Arena		200,000
August 3, 2024	New York	United States	Citi Field		200,000
August 6, 2024	Washington, D.C.	United States	Capital One Arena		200,000
August 8, 2024	Toronto	Canada	Scotiabank Arena		200,000
August 10, 2024	Rosemont	United States	Allstate Arena		200,000
August 11, 2024	Rosemont	United States	Allstate Arena		200,000
Europe
January 18, 2025	Décines-Charpieu (Note: Promoted as Lyon-Décines.)	France	LDLC Arena	1. "Crazy Form"; 2. "Say My Name" (Band Ver.); 3. "Win" (Band Ver.); 4. "This World"; 5. "Wake Up"; 6. "Guerrilla" (Flag Ver.); 7. "Cyberpunk"; 8. "Halazia"; 9. "It's You"; 10. "Youth"; 11. "Everything"; 12. "Silver Light"; 13. "Crescent Part 2"; 14. "Wave"; 15. "Dancing Like Butterfly Wings"; 16. "Matz"; 17. "Scene 1: Value"; 18. "Ice On My Teeth"; 19. "Arriba"; 20. "Django"; 21. "Bouncy (K-Hot Chilli Peppers)"; 22. "Wonderland" (Symphony No. 9 "From The Wonderland"); 23. "Eternal Sunshine"; 24. "Fireworks" (Band Ver.); 25. "The Real" (Band Ver.); 26. "Work"; 27. "Dreamy Day"; 28. "Utopia" (EDM Party Mix)	180,000
January 20, 2025	Milan	Italy	Unipol Forum		180,000
January 23, 2025	Zurich	Switzerland	Hallenstadion		180,000
January 27, 2025	London	United Kingdom	The O2 Arena		180,000
January 28, 2025	London	United Kingdom	The O2 Arena		180,000
January 30, 2025	Manchester	United Kingdom	Manchester Arena		180,000
February 3, 2025	Amsterdam	Netherlands	Ziggo Dome		180,000
February 7, 2025	Barcelona	Spain	Palau Sant Jordi		180,000
February 11, 2025	Cologne	Germany	Lanxess Arena		180,000
February 14, 2025	Copenhagen	Denmark	Royal Arena		180,000
February 18, 2025	Berlin	Germany	Uber Arena		180,000
February 19, 2025	Berlin	Germany	Uber Arena		180,000
February 22, 2025	Nanterre (Note: Promoted as Paris.)	France	Paris La Défense Arena		180,000
February 25, 2025	Brussels	Belgium	ING Arena		180,000
Encores
March 22, 2025	Seoul	South Korea	KSPO Dome		—
March 23, 2025	Seoul	South Korea	KSPO Dome		—
Total					441,548

== In Your Fantasy ==
In Your Fantasy
- World tour by Ateez
- Location: Asia; North America; Australia
- Associated albums: Golden Hour: Part.3; Golden Hour: Part.3 'In Your Fantasy Edition'
- Start date: July 5, 2025
- End date: April 4, 2026
- No. of shows: 34

Ateez concert chronology
- Towards The Light: Will To Power (2024-2025); In Your Fantasy (2025-2026)

Concert dates
Date	City	Country	Venue	Attendance
Asia
July 5, 2025	Incheon	South Korea	Inspire Arena	—
July 6, 2025	Incheon	South Korea	Inspire Arena	—
North America
July 10, 2025	Atlanta	United States	State Farm Arena	220,000
July 13, 2025	New York	United States	Citi Field	220,000
July 16, 2025	Baltimore	United States	CFG Bank Arena	220,000
July 19, 2025	Nashville	United States	Bridgestone Arena	220,000
July 21, 2025	Orlando	United States	Kia Center	220,000
July 22, 2025	Orlando	United States	Kia Center	220,000
July 26, 2025	Chicago	United States	Wrigley Field	220,000
July 30, 2025	Tacoma	United States	Tacoma Dome	220,000
August 2, 2025	San Jose	United States	SAP Center at San Jose	220,000
August 8, 2025	Los Angeles	United States	BMO Stadium	220,000
August 9, 2025	Los Angeles	United States	BMO Stadium	220,000
August 12, 2025	Glendale	United States	Desert Diamond Arena	220,000
August 16, 2025	Arlington	United States	Globe Life Field	220,000
August 23, 2025	Mexico City	Mexico	Estadio GNP Seguros	220,000
Asia
September 13, 2025	Saitama	Japan	Saitama Super Arena	
September 14, 2025	Saitama	Japan	Saitama Super Arena	
September 15, 2025	Saitama	Japan	Saitama Super Arena	
September 20, 2025	Nagoya	Japan	Port Messe Nagoya	
September 21, 2025	Nagoya	Japan	Port Messe Nagoya	
October 22, 2025	Kobe	Japan	Glion Arena Kobe	
October 23, 2025	Kobe	Japan	Glion Arena Kobe	
January 24, 2026	Taipei	Taiwan	NTSU Arena	
January 31, 2026	Jakarta	Indonesia	Indonesia Convention Exhibition	
February 22, 2026	Singapore		Singapore Indoor Stadium	
Australia
March 2, 2026	Melbourne	Australia	Rod Laver Arena	
March 3, 2026	Melbourne	Australia	Rod Laver Arena	
March 6, 2026	Sydney	Australia	Qudos Bank Arena	
March 7, 2026	Sydney	Australia	Qudos Bank Arena	
Asia
March 14, 2026	Manila	Philippines	Araneta Coliseum	
March 22, 2026	Kuala Lumpur	Malaysia	Axiata Arena	
March 28, 2026	Cotai	Macau	The Venetian Arena	
April 4, 2026	Bangkok	Thailand	Impact Exhibition Hall 5-6	
Total				N/A

== Fanmeetings ==
Title	Date	City	Country	Venue/Network	Ref.
'ATINY's Voyage: From A to Z'	July 6–7, 2024	Seoul	South Korea	Jamsil Indoor Stadium	
'ATINY's Voyage: From A to Z'	August 21–22, 2024	Tokyo	Japan	Tokyo Garden Theater	
'ATINY's Voyage: From A to Z'	March 28–29, 2025	Kobe	Japan	Kobe World Memorial Hall	
'ATINY's Voyage: From A to Z'	List of cancelled dates				
'ATINY's Voyage: From A to Z'	August 27–28, 2024	Osaka	Japan	Grand Cube Osaka	
DAWN:26	January 17, 2026	Seoul	South Korea	Ewha Womans University Grand Hall	
ATINY's Voyage: Tiny Mystery	July 17–19, 2026	Seoul	South Korea	Korea University Hwajeong Tiger Dome	
ATINY's Voyage: Tiny Mystery	August 4–6, 2026	Yokohama	Japan	K-Arena Yokohama	

== Concerts and other live performances ==
Title	Date	City	Country	Venue/Network	Ref.
Ateez The 1st Atiny Party 'Del Mundo'	July 27, 2019	Seoul	South Korea	Yes24 Live Hall	
ATEEZ 1st Anniversary 'Moon River'	October 24, 2019	Seoul	South Korea	The River Grand Hall	
Ateez Online Atiny Party 'Crescent'	May 30, 2020	Worldwide		V Live	
Ateez Comeback Concert Air Con 'Zero: Fever Part.1'	July 28, 2020	Worldwide		MyMusicTaste, M2	
Ateez 2nd Anniversary Online Concert: Port of Call	October 24, 2020	Worldwide		MyMusicTaste	
Ateez Special Live 'Into the A to Z'	April 25, 2021	Japan		Fuji TV TWO	
Ateez Summer Vacation Camp 'Dreamers'	August 28–29, 2021	Japan		Eplus, Mnet Japan	
Ateez XR Show 'Fever: eXtended edition'	November 14, 2021	Worldwide		MyMusicTaste	
Global Spin Live: Ateez	February 8, 2022	Los Angeles	United States	Grammy Museum L.A. Live	
The Fellowship: Beginning of the End Japan Edition Livestream	March 27, 2022	Japan		Wowow	

== Showcases ==
Title	Date	City	Country	Venue/Network	Ref.
Ateez Debut Showcase	October 24, 2018	Seoul	South Korea	Yes24 Live Hall	
Ateez Treasure EP.2: Zero to One Showcase	January 16, 2019	Seoul	South Korea	Yes24 Live Hall	
'Ateez: Treasure Map' Premiere Showcase	June 10, 2019	Seoul	South Korea	CJ E&M Center	
Ateez Treasure EP.Fin: All To Action Showcase	October 8, 2019	Seoul	South Korea	Ilchi Art Hall	
Ateez Zero: Fever Part.2 Online Showcase	March 2, 2021	Worldwide		V Live	
Ateez Zero: Fever Part.3 Comeback Showcase	September 13, 2021	Worldwide		Universe	
Ateez The World Ep.1: Movement Showcase	July 28, 2022	Seoul	South Korea	Daeyang Hall, Sejong University	
Ateez The World Ep. 2: Outlaw Showcase	June 15, 2023	Seoul	South Korea	KBS Arena	

== Joint concerts and festivals ==
Title	Date	City	Country	Venue/Network	Ref.
KCON 2019 Japan	May 17, 2019	Chiba	Japan	Makuhari Messe	
KCON 2019 NY	July 6, 2019	New York City	United States	Javits Center	
KCON 2019 LA	August 17, 2019	Los Angeles	United States	Los Angeles Convention Center	
2019 K-world Festa	August 24, 2019	Seoul	South Korea	Olympic Park KSPO Dome	
2019 Smartfren Wow Concert	September 20, 2019	Jakarta	Indonesia	Istora Senayan	
KCON 2019 Thailand	September 29, 2019	Bangkok	Thailand	Impact Arena	
Spotify On Stage Jakarta 2019	October 4, 2019	Jakarta	Indonesia	Jakarta International Expo	
2019 SMUF K-pop	October 6, 2019	Seoul	South Korea	Gwanghwamun Plaza	
2019 Asia Song Festival	October 12, 2019	Ulsan	South Korea	Ulsan Auxiliary Stadium	
2019 Busan One Asia Festival	October 19, 2019	Busan	South Korea	Hwamyeong Ecological Park	
2019 No Smoking Festival	December 20, 2019	Seoul	South Korea	SBS Prism Tower	
KCON:TACT 2020 Summer	June 26, 2020	Worldwide		Mnet K-Pop YouTube Channel	
2020 Asia Song Festival	October 10, 2020	Gyeongju	South Korea	Gyeongju Hwabaek Convention Center	
KCON:TACT 2020 Fall	October 18, 2020	Worldwide		Mnet K-Pop YouTube Channel	
2020 Korea Music Drive-In Festival (KMDF)	October 31, 2020	Incheon	South Korea	Incheon Port	
2020 SBS Gayo Daejeon	December 25, 2020	Daegu	South Korea	Daegu Athletics Center	
UNI-KON 2021	February 14, 2021	Worldwide		UNIVERSE	
KCON:TACT 3	March 27, 2021	Worldwide		Mnet K-Pop YouTube Channel	
2021 THE BOYZ x ATEEZ Online Live: "2WILIGHT ZONE"	September 17, 2021	Worldwide		U+ IDOL LIVE, MyMusicTaste	
KCON:TACT HI 5	September 24, 2021	Worldwide		Mnet K-Pop YouTube Channel	
MU:CON 2021	October 2, 2021	Worldwide		KOCCA MUSIC YouTube Channel	
2021 Mekong-Korea Friendship Concert	October 22, 2021	Worldwide		1theK YouTube Channel	
2021 SBS Super Concert in Daegu	October 31, 2021	Daegu	South Korea	Daegu Stadium	
2021 Changwon K-pop World Festival	November 3, 2021	Worldwide		KBS World TV YouTube Channel	
2021 SBS Gayo Daejeon	December 25, 2021	Incheon	South Korea	Namdong Gymnasium	
Jeddah K-POP Festival	June 30, 2022	Jeddah	Saudi Arabia	Jeddah Superdome	
UNI-KON 2022	July 3, 2022	Seoul	South Korea	Olympic Handball Gymnasium	
2022 Ulsan Summer Festival- Show! Music Core	August 8, 2022	Ulsan	South Korea	Ulsan Sports Complex Auxiliary Stadium	
KCON 2022 LA	August 20, 2022	Los Angeles	United States	Crypto.com Arena	
Kpop Land 2022 in Jakarta	September 16, 2022	Jakarta	Indonesia	Stadium Baseball Senayan	
K-pop Masterz Ep.2 in Manila	September 23, 2022	Manila	Philippines	Araneta Coliseum	
K-pop Masterz Ep.2 in Bangkok	September 25, 2022	Bangkok	Thailand	Bangkok International Trade and Exhibition Centre	
KCON 2022 Saudi Arabia	October 1, 2022	Riyadh	Saudi Arabia	Boulevard Riyadh City	
2022 Powerful Daegu K-POP Concert Re;START	October 9, 2022	Daegu	South Korea	Kyungpook National University	
KCON 2022 Japan	October 16, 2022	Tokyo	Japan	Ariake Arena	
2022 KBS Song Festival	December 16, 2022	Seoul	South Korea	Jamsil Arena	
2022 SBS Gayo Daejeon	December 24, 2022	Seoul	South Korea	Gocheok Sky Dome	
2022 MBC Gayo Daejejeon	December 31, 2022	Ilsan	South Korea	MBC Dream Center	
KCON 2023 Thailand	March 19, 2023	Bangkok	Thailand	IMPACT Arena	
2023 LOVESOME Festival	April 22, 2023	Seoul	South Korea	Seoul Olympic Stadium	
K-POP Super Live at Seoul Festa 2023	April 30, 2023	Seoul	South Korea	Seoul Olympic Stadium	
The Dance Day Live 2023	May 11–12, 2023	Tokyo	Japan	Nippon Budokan	
KCON Japan 2023	May 13, 2023	Chiba	Japan	Makuhari Messe	
KPOP LUX Madrid	July 22, 2023	Madrid	Spain	Metropolitano Stadium	
Waterbomb Japan	July 30, 2023	Tokyo	Japan	Belluna Dome	
KCON 2023 LA	August 19, 2023	Los Angeles	United States	Crypto.com Arena	
Idol Radio Live in Seoul	September 23, 2023	Seoul	South Korea	Seoul World Cup Stadium	
SBS Inkigayo Live in Tokyo	October 3, 2023	Tokyo	Japan	Ariake Arena	
2023 Yeongdong-daero K-POP Concert	October 8, 2023	Seoul	South Korea	In front of Hotel Riviera	
MCOUNTDOWN in France	October 15, 2023	Paris	France	Paris La Défense Arena	
Immortal Songs Live Concert in New York	October 26, 2023	Newark	United States	Prudential Center	
Korea on Stage London 2023	November 8, 2023	London	England	OVO Arena Wembley	
D.U.N.K Showcase	December 2–3, 2023	Osaka	Japan	Kyocera Dome	
Music Bank Global Festival 2023	December 9, 2023	Saitama	Japan	Belluna Dome	
2023 SBS Gayo Daejeon	December 25, 2023	Incheon	South Korea	INSPIRE Arena	
2023 MBC Gayo Daejejeon	December 31, 2023	Ilsan	South Korea	MBC Dream Center	
KCON Hong Kong 2024	March 31, 2024	Hong Kong		AsiaWorld-Expo	
Coachella 2024	April 12, 2024	Indio	United States	Sahara Stage, Empire Polo Club	
Coachella 2024	April 19, 2024	Indio	United States	Sahara Stage, Empire Polo Club	
K-Wave Concert Inkigayo	June 2, 2024	Incheon	South Korea	INSPIRE Arena	
Mawazine Festival 2024	June 23, 2024	Rabat	Morocco	OLM Souissi	
BEAT AX Vol.4	June 28–29, 2024	Chiba	Japan	Makuhari Messe	
Show! Music Core in Japan	June 30, 2024	Saitama	Japan	Belluna Dome	
Summer Sonic 2024	August 17, 2024	Osaka	Japan	Air Stage, Expo Commemoration Park	
Summer Sonic 2024	August 18, 2024	Chiba	Japan	Marine stage, ZOZO Marine Stadium	
City Camp Indonesia	October 5, 2024	Jakarta	Indonesia	Indonesia Arena	
K-pop Masterz 2024 in Bangkok	October 6, 2024	Bangkok	Thailand	Impact Arena	
SBS Inkigayo Live in Tokyo	October 12, 2024	Tokyo	Japan	Saitama Super Arena	
Grand Mint Festival 2024	November 3, 2024	Seoul	South Korea	Mint Breeze Stage, Olympic Park	
Music Bank Global Festival in Japan	December 19, 2024	Fukuoka	Japan	Mizuho PayPay Dome Fukuoka	
2024 SBS Gayo Daejeon	December 25, 2024	Incheon	South Korea	Inspire Arena	
2024 MBC Gayo Daejejeon	December 31, 2024	Incheon	South Korea	MBC Dream Center	
The Performance	March 30, 2025	Yokohama	Japan	K-Arena Yokohama	
Ingalive Uni-Con	April 12, 2025	Tokyo	Japan	Tokyo Dome	
Kpop Masterz 2025 in Santiago	May 15, 2025	Santiago	Chile	Parque Estadio Nacional	
Kpop Masterz 2025 in Kuala Lumpur	May 31, 2025	Kuala Lumpur	Malaysia	MINES Exhibition Centre	
2025 Busan One Asia Festival	June 11, 2025	Busan	South Korea	BEXCO Exhibition Hall 1	
Mrs. GREEN APPLE presents「CEREMONY」	June 18, 2025	Yokohama	Japan	K-Arena Yokohama	
Music Bank in Lisbon	September 27, 2025	Lisbon	Portugal	MEO Arena	
Dream Festival 2025	November 3, 2025	Chiba	Japan	Makuhari Messe	
Waterbomb Macao 2025	November 9, 2025	Macau		Macao Outdoor Performance Venue	
Dream Concert	November 22, 2025	Abu Dhabi	UAE	Etihad Park	
KPop Masterz 2025 in Jeddah	November 27, 2025	Jeddah	Saudi Arabia	Abadi Al Johar Arena	
ACON 2025	December 7, 2025	Kaohsiung	Taiwan	Kaohsiung National Stadium	
Music Bank Global Festival in Japan	December 13, 2025	Tokyo	Japan	Tokyo National Stadium	
The Performance	April 11–12, 2026	Yokohama	Japan	K-Arena Yokohama	
BST Hyde Park	June 28, 2026	London	United Kingdom	Hyde Park	
Rock in Roma	July 8, 2026	Rome	Italy	Capannelle Racecourse	
2026 SBS Gayo Daejeon Summer	August 9, 2026	Goyang	South Korea	KINTEX	
İstanbul Festivali	August 14, 2026	Istanbul	Turkey	Festival Park Yenikapı	

=== University festivals ===
Title	Date	City	Country	Venue/Network	Ref.
Yonsei University 'AKARAKA' Festival 2024	May 26, 2024	Seoul	South Korea	Yonsei University	
Sungkyunkwan University Festival 2024	May 29, 2024	Seoul	South Korea	Sungkyunkwan University	

== Television shows and specials ==
Title	Date	Country	Venue/Network	Performed song(s)	Ref.
Immortal Songs: Singing the Legend	August 29, 2020	South Korea	KBS	"Black Cat Nero"	
2020 Immortal Songs King of Kings Special	December 19, 2020	South Korea	KBS	"Anyhow Song"	
Immortal Songs: Singing the Legend	February 6, 2021	South Korea	KBS	"It's Raining"	
Love Music	February 28, 2021	Japan	FUJI TV	"Answer" (Japanese ver.)	
BREAK OUT	April 14, 2021	Japan	TV Asahi	"Answer" (Japanese ver.)	
Immortal Songs: Singing the Legend	May 22, 2021	South Korea	KBS	"Right Now"	
2021 Immortal Songs King of Kings Special	December 25, 2021	South Korea	KBS	"Nillili Mambo" + "Fantastic Baby" + "The Real (Heung ver.)"	
BREAK OUT	May 26, 2022	Japan	TV Asahi	"Rocky" (Boxers ver.)	
Buzz Rhythm 02	June 16, 2023	Japan	NTV	"Limitless"	
Immortal Songs: Singing the Legend	June 17, 2023	South Korea	KBS	"Highway in the Gale"	
CDTV Live! Live!	December 4, 2023	Japan	TBS	"Crazy Form"	
Venue101	March 2, 2024	Japan	NHK	"Not Okay"	
Buzz Rhythm 02	March 2, 2024	Japan	NTV	"Not Okay"	
Music Station	May 10, 2024	Japan	TV Asahi	"Not Okay"	
The Kelly Clarkson Show	June 10, 2024	United States	NBC	"Work"	
