= Charles Johnstone (disambiguation) =

Charles Johnstone may refer to:

- Charles Johnstone (1719–1800), Irish novelist
- Charlie Johnstone (1856–1941), footballer
- Charles Johnstone (athlete) (1903–1999), British athlete

== See also ==
- Charles Johnson (disambiguation)
- Charles Johnston (disambiguation)
