= Michael Joiner =

American basketball player and coach

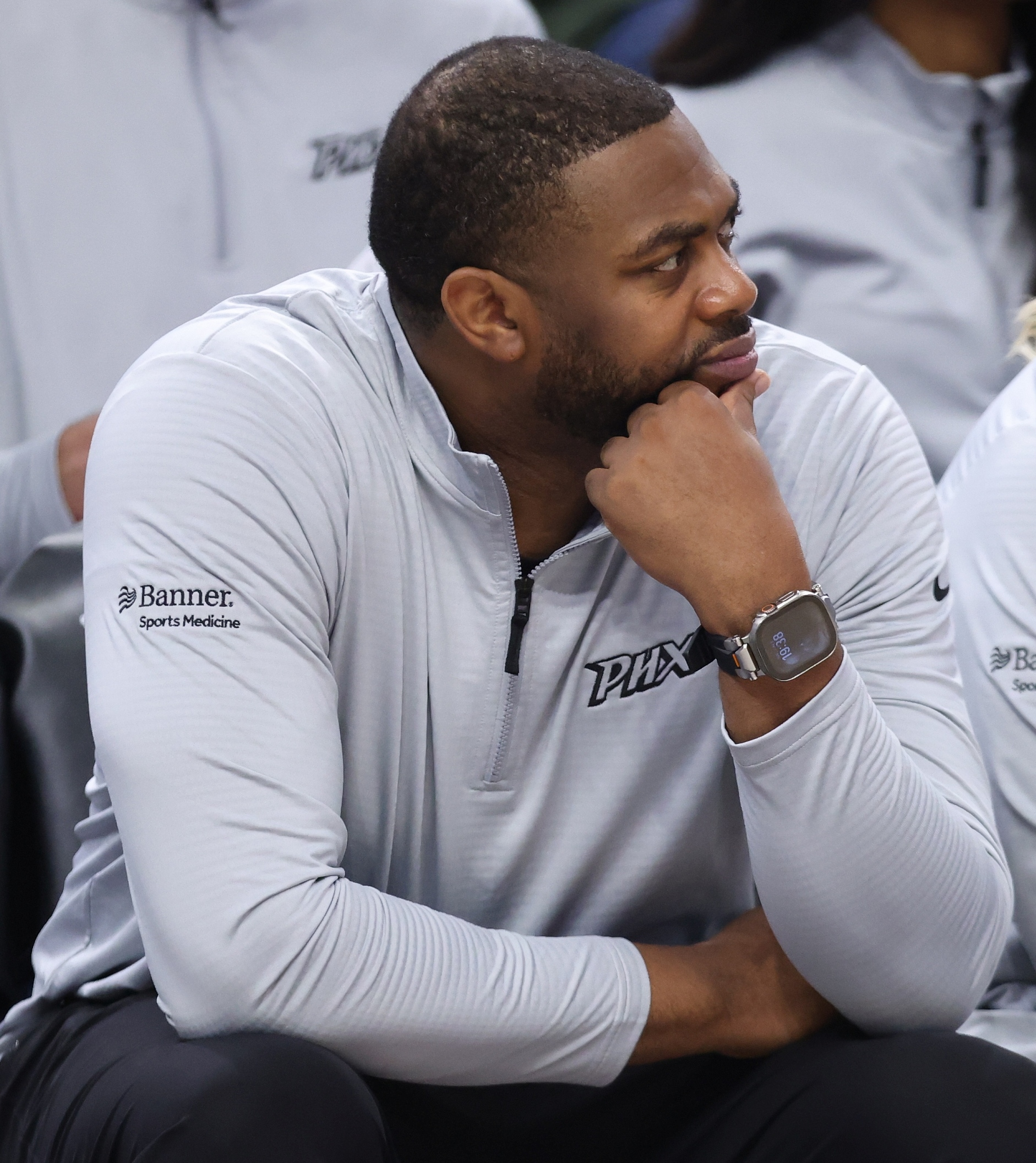
- Joiner with the Phoenix Mercury in 2025

Seattle Storm
- Position: Assistant coach
- League: WNBA

Personal information
- Born: October 28, 1981 (age 45) Fayetteville, North Carolina, U.S.
- Listed height: 6 ft 7 in (2.01 m)
- Listed weight: 245 lb (111 kg)

Career information
- High school: Seventy-First (Fayetteville, North Carolina)
- College: Florida State (2000–2004)
- NBA draft: 2004: undrafted
- Playing career: 2004–present

Career history

Playing
- 2004–2005: Sheffield Sharks
- 2005–2006: Albany Patroons
- 2006: Arkansas ArchAngels
- 2006: Amsterdam
- 2006–2007: Lobos Grises de la UAD
- 2007: Quad City Riverhawks
- 2007: Canterbury Rams
- 2007–2010: Sioux Falls Skyforce
- 2008–2009: Daegu Orions
- 2009: Gold Coast Blaze
- 2010–2011: Austin Toros
- 2010: Henan Jiyuan
- 2011: Whampoa
- 2013–2014: Saitama Broncos

Coaching
- 2019–2024: Memphis Hustle (assistant)
- 2024–2025: Phoenix Mercury (assistant)
- 2026–present: Seattle Storm (assistant)

Career highlights
- ACC All-Freshman team (2001)

Michael Vincent Joiner (born October 28, 1981) is an American professional basketball coach and former player who is currently an assistant coach for the Seattle Storm of the Women's National Basketball Association (WNBA). He is 6'7" and played the small forward and sometimes power forward positions.

Born in Kansas City, Missouri, Joiner graduated from Seventy-First High School in Fayetteville, North Carolina in 2000. He attended Florida State University.

In 2007, Joiner averaged 19.3 points per game in his 18 matches for the Canterbury Rams in the New Zealand National Basketball League.

For the 2008–09 season, Joiner averaged 8.5 points, 4.9 rebounds and 1.5 assists per game for the Sioux Falls Skyforce in the NBA Development League.

== Coaching career ==
For the 2019–20 season, Joiner was added to the coaching staff of the G League's Memphis Hustle as an assistant. In January 2024, the Phoenix Mercury hired Joiner as an assistant coach to Nate Tibbetts.
