= Seventy-First High School =

Secondary school in Fayetteville, North Carolina

Location
- 6764 Raeford Rd; Fayetteville, North Carolina 28304; United States; 35°02′18″N 79°00′33″W

Information
- Type: Public
- Established: 1924 (102 years ago)
- CEEB code: 341325
- Principal: James Blue
- Teaching staff: 77.21 (FTE)
- Grades: 9–12
- Enrollment: 1,360 (2023–2024)
- Student to teacher ratio: 17.61
- Colors: Red and white
- Mascot: Falcon
- Feeder schools: Lewis Chapel Middle, Anne Chestnutt Middle, New Century International Middle
- Website: sfhs.ccs.k12.nc.us

Seventy-First High School is a high school located in Fayetteville, North Carolina. It was formed by the consolidation of six schools in 1924.

== History ==
Six schools in the Seventy-First Township consolidated in 1924 to form one: McPherson, Glendale, Haymount, Kornbow, Westover, and Galatia. The new school, built on the Glendale site, was named after the township. The township was named after the Scottish immigrants who were descendants of the 71st Regiment of Foot, Fraser's Highlanders, a Scots regiment of the British Army that fought with distinction during the French and Indian War and then disbanded. The 71st (Highland) Regiment was later re-raised during the American Revolutionary War and fought with distinction throughout its duration.

The original school was built in November 1924, consisting of one two-story building with thirteen classrooms for grades one through twelve. A total enrollment of three hundred sixty-seven enthusiastic and dedicated students opened wide its doors of learning. On May 25, 1925, Seventy-First inaugurated its first graduation. A class consisting of five members achieved the first commencement exercise.

The original building now houses the Seventy-First Classical Middle School.

In 1962, a new building was built across the street and in the fall of that same year, the first classes were held in the new building. The wing at the back was added in 1965. The school was growing so rapidly that huts were added in 1966 and each year until 1972, and again from 1973 until 1976. Another new wing was added in 1967.

In the spring of 1973, new tennis courts, new football bleachers, and other improvements were added to the athletic field. In the 1972–1973 school year, Seventy-First received full accreditation from the Southern Association of Colleges and Schools. A new vocational building and a new greenhouse were officially opened for the 1974–75 school year. Construction of the newest wing was begun in the fall of 1988 for use in the 1989–1990 school year.

Student enrollment continued to soar until it reached 2,544 in 1976–1977 school year making Seventy-First the most populated high school in North Carolina. Douglas Byrd High School was opened in 1972 to alleviate the growth at Seventy-First, as was Westover High School in 1977.

Another major change for the system occurred in the summer of 1985, when the Cumberland County and Fayetteville City school systems merged to form the Cumberland County School System, making this the fourth-largest system in the state. To date, Seventy-First High School is one of the seventeen high schools in the Cumberland County school system.

The principals of the school since its opening have been:

- 1924–1926 J.W. Carroll
- 1926–1928 C.C. McMillan
- 1929–1931 J.H. Taylor
- 1931–1945 J.W. Coon
- 1945–1968 L.E. Auman
- 1968–1976 R.C. Lewis
- 1976–1982 K.S. Edge
- 1982–1995 G.C. Patterson
- 1995–1996 Mary McDuffy
- 1996–1999 Conrad Lopes
- 1999–2008 Tina Poltrock
- 2008–2010 Alton Miller
- 2010–2012 Vanessa Alford
- 2012–2022 Myron Williams
- 2022–2024 Niesha Witherspoon
- 2024–present James Blue

Seventy-First High School has 100 classrooms, a greenhouse, two gymnasiums, an auditorium that can seat 300 people, a media center, and cafeteria.

== Notable alumni ==
- Anthony Hilliard — professional basketball player
- Chuckie Johnson — former NFL defensive tackle
- Michael Joiner — professional basketball player
- Doug McDougald — NFL defensive end
- Everett McIver — NFL offensive guard
- Jason "Mayhem" Miller — professional mixed martial arts fighter
- Marvin Powell — NFL 3x First-team All-Pro and 5x Pro Bowl offensive tackle
- LaToya Sanders — WNBA player and coach, WNBA champion in 2019
- Harry Sydney — NFL running back
- Moon Tae-jong "Jarod Stevenson" — professional basketball player
- Mun Tae-yeong "Greg Stevenson" — professional basketball player
