= PurchasePro =

Internet startup company 1997-2003

- Company type: Public company
- Traded as: Nasdaq: PPRO
- Industry: Hotel industry
- Founded: 1997; 29 years ago
- Founder: Charles E. Johnson Jr.
- Defunct: 2002
- Fate: Bankruptcy after accounting fraud
- Headquarters: Las Vegas, Nevada, United States
- Area served: United States
- Products: Online purchasing platform
- Number of employees: 1,000 (2001 peak)

PurchasePro was a business-to-business Internet startup company founded in Las Vegas, Nevada in 1997 by Charles E. Johnson Jr., originally to help hotels and casinos pool their purchase power via an online exchange.

The company's accounting practices and subsequent bankruptcy became a scandal involving a number of its executives and those working at AOL.

== History ==
=== Business model and early success ===
The company's business model was to charge vendors and purchasers a flat monthly fee for use of the site and to take a commission on sales. The business logic was that online purchasing would save hotels money by speeding up the purchasing process for towels, linens, soap and other basic goods.

The company went public on the NASDAQ exchange in September 1999 and its stock price doubled in the first day of trading. In 1999 and 2000 the company entered marketing agreements with large Internet companies and business service providers like AOL and Office Depot.

At its height, the company had 1,000 employees and a market capitalization of more than $4 billion.

=== Problems and bankruptcy ===
The company was never profitable. Despite heavily-discounted subscription fees and low margins, customers often found that buying goods online was more expensive and less convenient than traditional wholesale purchasing. The company attracted over 140,000 mostly small and medium-sized vendors by making strategic "preferred" deals. Many of these deals involved PurchasePro giving away stock or its partners providing free services, which generated losses for both sides. PurchasePro's stock value began to fall quickly in April, 2001 after it announced that it would fall short of its revenue predictions. Investors began to question the company's accounting practices and the truthfulness of its prior financial claims. Founder and CEO Charles Johnson was forced to resign by PurchasePro's board of directors in May, 2001. The company filed for bankruptcy in September, 2002, and PurchasePro's assets were sold for $2.5 million in January, 2003.

=== Legal problems and founder's fraud conviction ===
In November 2008 a US court found the company had conspired with AOL executives to overstate revenue from software licenses that AOL sold for PurchasePro. The companies inflated the license-sales figures by not reporting that most of these sales were made in exchange for commitments to buy products from the licensees, which hid the fact that only a small fraction of customers ever paid for these licenses. PurchasePro also backdated and forged contracts to meet revenue projections. These accounting deceptions fooled investors into believing PurchasePro had met its sales projections and bolstered its stock price. Overall, revenues were overstated by 37% in the first quarter of 2001.

AOL and a number of its executives reached settlements, including payment of a $210 million fine, to avoid criminal and civil prosecution. Johnson and other PurchasePro executives were charged with stock fraud. Johnson's first prosecution ended in a mistrial after his attorneys resigned upon discovering that Johnson was forging email messages to introduce false evidence in his favor. His second trial ended in November, 2008 with a conviction for stock fraud and obstruction of justice and a sentence of 8 years in prison.
