= Selling away =

Selling away in the U.S. securities brokerage industry is the inappropriate practice of an investment professional (such as a registered representative, stockbroker, or financial adviser) who sells, or solicits the sale of, securities not held or offered by the brokerage firm with which he is associated (affiliated). An example of the term expressed in a sentence is, "The broker was selling investments away from the firm." Brokers marketing securities must have obtained the appropriate securities licenses for various types of investments. Brokers in the U.S. may be "associated" with one or more Brokerage firms and must obtain licenses by passing standardized Financial Industry Regulatory Authority (FINRA) exams such as the Series 6 or Series 7 exam. See List of Securities Examinations for types of securities licenses in the U.S.

More specifically, selling away describes the situation in which the transaction or securities in question are not approved for sale by the firm; they are not on the firm’s approved product list. The approved product list identifies the types of securities and investments that are approved for brokers to sell after the securities have been analyzed during the brokerage firm's due diligence process, which includes receiving the necessary risk and compliance department reviews and approvals.

Selling away often involves investment securities that are in the form of a private placement or other non-public investment, though not always. Sometimes a transaction may not be an obvious or apparent 'investment' or security. Selling away may not always be deliberate or intentional or with even intent to deceive an investor, but in many cases, the broker deliberately solicited one or more investments without approval of the firm with which he is associated. Selling away is often conducted in conjunction with a broker's outside business activity (another business or activity that a broker conducts outside of and separate from the securities brokerage activities at his/her associated firm.)

Selling away situations may result from a broker's desire not to pass up on earning a commission on an investment product his client is willing to buy, and further, not to have to share the commission with his/her associated firm. Selling away schemes may be especially dangerous for investors because the investor may end up becoming a victim of theft, securities fraud, or other loss related to the investment. These schemes often involve the sale of promissory notes which are essentially loans to the broker wherein the borrower promises to pay investors a high rate of interest for the loan from the investor. Once the investor (client) remits the money, the borrower may sooner or later stop (or never begin) paying the interest and the client’s investment may not be returned.

== Securities regulations; liability of the brokerage firm ==
Generally, selling away is a violation of securities regulations and the firm's compliance procedures unless it is approved in advance. Further, such "outside" investments may in themselves be fraudulent. The regulatory basis for selling away cases is found in FINRA rule 3270 (formerly NASD rule 3030). Rule 3270 provides that a brokerage firm representative may not engage in any outside business activity unless he has provided prompt written notice to his or her brokerage firm. Rule 3040 provides that a brokerage firm representative must not engage in private securities transactions (that is, selling away) unless approved by the firm and states the procedures that a brokerage firm must follow to approve of such investments. Once approved, the brokerage firm must supervise these private securities transactions.

Brokers are cautioned by FINRA about practices that could violate securities regulations, including selling away. "Selling securities without processing the order through your firm and without your firm's permission or knowledge is a violation of FINRA rules. Even products that you may not consider to be securities, such as leasing arrangements or promissory notes, may be securities under federal or state law. Check with your firm before engaging in any securities transactions for any purpose."

The firm may not have advance knowledge of such sales and activities. The question then becomes whether the brokerage firm "should have known" of the outside sales and activities. Robert Lowry, a securities law expert, suggests that the brokerage firm must demonstrate three things to prove it is not liable. First, that the firm has a reasonable supervisory system in place. Second, that the firm implemented its procedures in a reasonable fashion. Third, that the firm vigorously investigated red flags, which would have been any suggestion of irregularity or unusual trading activity, including client complaints and disciplinary actions by a securities regulator.

Claimants' lawyers, on the other hand, must demonstrate that the brokerage firm essentially failed to execute properly on one or more of the three foregoing points, i.e., (i.) failed to establish and/or (ii.) failed to implement reasonable supervisory procedures, or (iii.) failed to properly follow-up on red flags. Robert Lowry suggests that client lawyers provide illustrations of how the brokerage firm's supervision fell through the cracks, thereby causing the client harm.

A survey of some FINRA/NASD disciplinary actions illustrates the broad scope of not only the types of investments that are "sold away" but also the types of brokerage firms. In one example, an adviser from Summit Capital Investment Group convinced 25 clients to invest in a fraudulent pay phone leasing deal. In another example, a representative from Linsco/Private Ledger Corporation (now rebranded LPL Financial) convinced clients to invest in a limited liability company (LLC) investing in real estate. Another example involved a PaineWebber rep who convinced clients to invest in an IPO trading program that was run by an outside entity.

These are just some examples of selling away cases, for which the brokerage firm, even if they were unaware of the sales, may still be held responsible, in whole or only in part.

== SEC reverses FINRA ruling ==
Right or wrong, FINRA likely prevails with brokers and firms settling arbitration disputes and complaints according to FINRA's final decision, however, according to Nov. 2008 articles published online by Securities Industry News and Investment News, the U.S. Securities and Exchange Commission (SEC), in a highly unusual move, reversed FINRA in a recent selling away case appeal.

The SEC set aside a FINRA decision in a selling away case where reps allegedly engaged in private securities transactions in violation of NASD Conduct Rule 3040. In its November 7, 2008 opinion, the SEC reversed FINRA predecessor NASD, explaining that the self-regulatory organization (SRO) had presented a “new theory of liability” that amounted to a novel interpretation of Rule 3040, which requires registered representatives to obtain approval before engaging in business activity away from their firm. It concluded that the record “provides insufficient support” that either of the two reps involved (James Browne or Kevin Calandro, two Dallas-based brokers formerly of PaineWebber Inc. of New York) participated in transactions in violation of the rule. “In sum, we … dismiss those charges,” said the commission. FINRA spokesperson Herbert Perone declined to comment on the decision.

For conduct dating to 1998, NASD had ordered that Browne be suspended for six months and fined $25,000, and Calandro three months and $5,000; because they were appealed, the suspensions never went into effect. The reps allegedly engaged in private deals without first providing written notice or obtaining approval from their member firm. The stock involved was that of e2 Communications, a software provider that filed for bankruptcy in 2002. Subsequent to e2’s bankruptcy filing, NASD filed a complaint alleging that between 1999 and 2000, Browne and Calandro referred a number of investors to the vendor and received compensation in the form of shares. In its explanation of liability, NASD said that “the receipt of selling compensation alone constitutes participation in the transactions for purposes of Rule 3040.”

In its ruling, the SEC countered that NASD had created a new interpretation of Rule 3040 without providing prior notice to the applicants. “This lack of notice alone raises sufficient concerns to warrant dismissal of the charges,” said the commission, adding that the SRO also failed to establish a connection between the reps’ referrals and the e2 stock transactions. “There was no proof that they were making introductions for investment purposes. Plus there was a significant time period between the introductions and the purchases,” said Brian Rubin, a Washington D.C.-based partner in law firm Sutherland Asbill & Brennan (now renamed "Sutherland") who represented Browne in the appeal. Rubin added that he has been unable to find another instance of the SEC reversing an NASD ruling for at least a decade.

Rubin, a former NASD deputy chief counsel of enforcement, said it is not unusual for reps that are selling away to avoid telling their firms because they are selling questionable products. However, “In this case,” he said, “the representatives knew people at the firm, e2, and introduced friends and clients to persons involved at e2, for the purposes of networking and for potential business between the two sides--but not for investment reasons.” Mr. Browne, who was once one of PaineWebber's biggest producers, was fired from now defunct Lehman Brothers Holdings Inc. of New York in 2003 because of the FINRA investigation, said Rubin. Browne now works for a hedge fund and Calandro now works at SMH Capital Inc., a subsidiary of Sanders Morris Harris Group Inc. of Dallas.

In upholding the NASD hearing panel’s 2006 decision, the NASD National Adjudicatory Council in December 2007 agreed that the case presented “uncommon and unusual” facts, added Rubin. “In our view, NASD pushed the envelope too far with respect to this type of violation,” he said. “And the SEC agreed with us.” As a result, “Individuals and firms should think long and hard before they decide to settle with FINRA."

FINRA's theory in going after Mr. Browne and Mr. Calandro was that, since startups like e2 often seek funding from various individuals involved with the company, the brokers should have known that introducing their clients to e2 would lead those clients to make investments in e2. "This was a junk case that never should have been brought," said Mr. Calandro's attorney, E. Steve Watson of E. Steve Watson Attorney at Law in Allen, Texas. Watson said the decision will "cut down the boundaries" of prior selling-away cases that gave enforcers wide latitude.

"I'm using it [the decision] a lot" in arguing other cases, said Jonathan Kord Lagemann, a Chatham, N.Y.-based defense attorney who is not connected to the case. "The moral here is ... there is value in forcing regulators to try their cases," said Pete Michaels, a defense attorney at Michaels Ward & Rabinovitz LLP in Boston who is not involved in the case.
