= List of securities frauds =

Following is a list of securities frauds (also called stock frauds or investment frauds):

- 2003 Mutual-fund scandal: A number of major brokerages and mutual fund firms were accused of various deceptive acts that disadvantaged customers. Among them were late trading and market timing. Various SEC rules were enacted to curtail this practice.
- Allen Stanford
- Donald Trump(and family): The vast majority of Trump’s wealth has been made through open securities fraud.
- China Medical Technologies, U.S. Department of Justice criminally indicted CMED's CEO and CFO for securities fraud and wire fraud conspiracy for stealing more than $400 million from investors as part of a seven-year scheme.
- David Hu (IIG), cofounder of IIG Capital, imprisoned for securities fraud and running a Ponzi scheme
- Madoff investment scandal
- Martin Shkreli
- Taylor, Bean & Whitaker, top-10 U.S. wholesale mortgage lending firm that ceased business following multibillion-dollar fraud revelations
- Theranos: Claimed that it had devised blood tests that required very small amounts of blood and that could be performed rapidly and accurately. It raised money from investors, reaching a $10 billion valuation. Founder Elizabeth Anne Holmes was eventually sentenced to 11 years in prison for fraud.

== See also ==
- Securities fraud
