= Charles E. Johnson Jr. =

Businessman convicted of fraud (born 1960s)

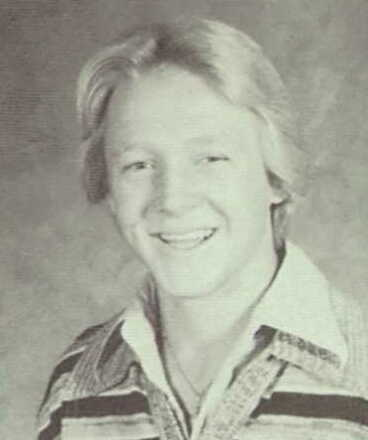
- Johnson in his 1979 high-school yearbook
- Born: 1961/1962 (age 63–64)
- Other names: "Junior"
- Employer: PurchasePro
- Criminal charges: Criminal conspiracy; Obstruction of justice; Securities fraud; Witness tampering; Parole violations
- Criminal penalty: Nine years imprisonment; Ten months imprisonment
- Criminal status: In custody as of May 2023

Charles E. Johnson Jr. (born 1961/1962) is the founder of PurchasePro, who was later convicted of criminal fraud in his management of the company.

== Personal life ==
Born in 1961 or 1962, Charles E. Johnson Jr. grew up in Lexington, Kentucky. There, he attended Lafayette High School and was on the school's 1979 championship basketball team. He later played basketball in college. Johnson is also known by the diminutive "Junior".

== PurchasePro ==
Johnson founded PurchasePro in 1996, which had a peak market worth of US$1.2 billion in the late 1990s, though went bankrupt in the early 2000s. In May 2001, Johnson was forced out of the company by its board of directors; at the time, he was the defendant in 17 pending lawsuits.

=== Crime ===
In January 2005, Johnson was indicted in the Eastern District of Virginia on charges of inflating the appearance of PurchasePro's revenues by using backdated contracts and falsified financial records (the Securities Exchange Act of 1934, § 10(b) and Rule 10b-5). At his first trial (US v. Johnson), Johnson was represented by Preston Burton of Orrick, Herrington & Sutcliffe. After providing Burton with fraudulent email evidence, the attorney withdrew from the case, resulting in a mistrial.

He later faced a bench trial in Alexandria, Virginia. On May 15, 2008, Judge Walter D. Kelley Jr. found Johnson guilty of criminal conspiracy, obstruction of justice, securities fraud, and witness tampering. Johnson was arrested by the Federal Bureau of Investigation on May 16 at his $9–15-million home in Summerlin, Nevada, and was sentenced to nine years imprisonment and ordered to pay restitution of $9.7 million (equivalent to about $14.2M in 2024).

After his release from prison, while under supervised release, Johnson violated his parole conditions by gambling in 2019, despite having paid little of his restitution. He was sentenced to ten further months imprisonment and re-placed on supervised release under the U.S. Probation and Pretrial Services System.

In August 2022, a federal grand jury indicted Johnson for failing to provide the Probation office with required financial information; he faced up to five further years in prison. While out on bail and prohibited to leave the Eastern District of Kentucky, he was proven to have been gambling at the Hard Rock Casino Cincinnati in February 2023. His bond was revoked on April 14, he was arrested in Minnesota on May 3, and he was imprisoned in the Sherburne County, Minnesota jail to await federal authorities.
