= Charles Johnston (captive) =

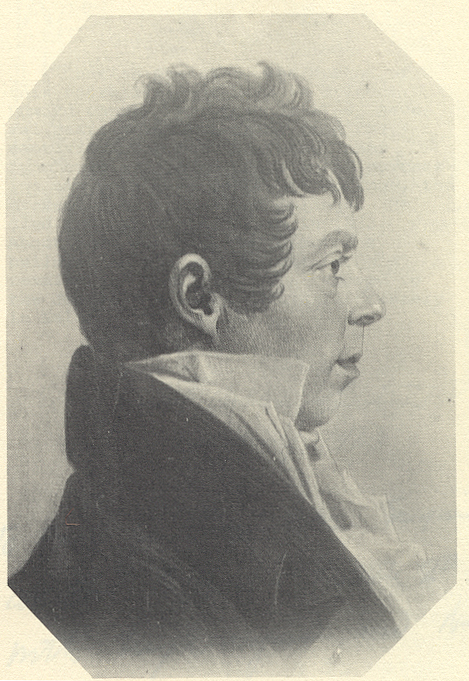
- Charles Johnston
- Born: 1770
- Died: 1833 (aged 62–63)
- Occupations: Lawyer; Author
- Known for: Being kidnapped by Shawnee

Charles Johnston (c. 1770 – 1833) was an American lawyer and author who spent five weeks as a captive of a Shawnee group, and later wrote a captivity narrative of his experience. In 1790, he was traveling down the Ohio River by keelboat with his employer John May, a Kentucky land speculator, as well as dry goods dealer Jacob Skyles, frontiersman William Flinn, and sisters Dolly and Peggy Fleming. Near the juncture of the Ohio and Scioto Rivers, the party was lured to the bank by an Indian stratagem. May and Dolly Fleming were killed outright and the four others taken prisoner. Johnston spent five weeks with the Shawnee before being ransomed for six hundred silver brooches by Francis Duchouquet, a Canadian trader. Johnston repaid his redeemer upon returning to Virginia. In 1827, he wrote his memoirs, A Narrative of the Incidents Attending Capture, Detention, and Ransom of Charles Johnston. He died in 1833.
