= Securities fraud =

Deceptive practice in the stock or commodities markets

Securities fraud, also known as stock fraud and investment fraud, is a deceptive practice in the stock or commodities markets that induces investors to make purchase or sale decisions on the basis of false information. The setups are generally made to result in monetary gain for the deceivers, and generally result in unfair monetary losses for the investors. They are generally violating securities laws.

Securities fraud can also include outright theft from investors (embezzlement by stockbrokers), stock manipulation, misstatements on a public company's financial reports, and lying to corporate auditors. The term encompasses a wide range of other actions, including insider trading, front running and other illegal acts on the trading floor of a stock or commodity exchange.

== Types of securities fraud ==
=== Corporate fraud ===
==== Corporate misconduct ====
Fraud by high-level corporate officials became a subject of wide national attention during the early 2000s, as exemplified by corporate misconduct at Enron. It became a problem of such scope that the Bush administration announced what it described as an "aggressive agenda" against corporate fraud. Less widely publicized manifestations continue, such as the securities fraud conviction of Charles E. Johnson Jr., founder of PurchasePro in May 2008. FBI Director Robert Mueller predicted in April 2008 that corporate fraud cases would increase because of the subprime mortgage crisis.

==== Dummy corporations ====
Dummy corporations may be created by fraudsters to create the illusion of being an existing corporation with a similar name. Fraudsters then sell securities in the dummy corporation by misleading the investor into thinking that they are buying shares in the real corporation.

=== Internet fraud ===
According to enforcement officials of the SEC, criminals engage in pump-and-dump schemes in which false and/or fraudulent information is disseminated in chat rooms, forums, internet boards, and via email (spamming) with the purpose of causing a dramatic price increase in thinly traded stocks or stocks of shell companies (the "pump"). In other instances, fraudsters disseminate false information about a company in hopes of urging investors to sell their shares so that the stock price plummets.

When the price reaches a certain level, criminals immediately sell off their holdings of those stocks (the "dump"), realizing substantial profits before the stock price falls back to its usual low level. Any buyers of the stock who are unaware of the fraud become victims once the price falls.

The SEC says that Internet fraud resides in several forms:

- Online investment newsletters that offer seemingly unbiased information free of charge about featured companies or recommending "stock picks of the month". These newsletter writers then sell shares, previously acquired at lower prices, when hype-generated buying drives the stock price up. This practice is known as scalping. Conflict of interest disclosures incorporated into a newsletter article may not be sufficient. Accused of scalping, Thom Calandra, formerly of MarketWatch, was the subject of an SEC enforcement action in 2004.
- Bulletin boards that often contain fraudulent messages by hucksters.
- Email spams from perpetrators of fraud.

=== Insider trading ===
There are two types of insider trading. The first is the trading of a corporation's stock or other security by corporate insiders such as officers, key employees, directors, or holders of more than ten percent of the firm's shares. This is generally legal, but there are certain reporting requirements.

The other type of insider trading is the purchase or sale of a security based on material non-public information. This type of trading is illegal in most instances. In illegal insider trading, an insider or a related party trades based on material non-public information obtained during the performance of the insider's duties at the corporation, or otherwise misappropriated.

=== Microcap fraud ===
In microcap fraud, stocks of small companies of under $250 million capitalization are deceptively promoted, then sold to an unwary public. This type of fraud has been estimated to cost investors $1-3 billion annually. Microcap fraud includes pump and dump schemes involving boiler rooms and scams on the Internet. Many, but not all, microcap stocks involved in frauds are penny stocks, which trade for less than $5 a share.

Many penny stocks, particularly those that sell for fractions of a cent, are thinly traded. They can become the target of stock promoters and manipulators. These manipulators first purchase large quantities of stock, then artificially inflate the share price through false and misleading positive statements. In more sophisticated versions of the fraud, individuals or organizations buy millions of shares, then use newsletter websites, chat rooms, stock message boards, press releases, or e-mail blasts to drive up interest in the stock. Very often, the perpetrator will claim to have "inside" information about impending news to persuade the unwitting investor to buy the shares. When buying pressure pushes the share price up, the rise in price entices more people to believe the hype and to buy shares as well. Eventually the manipulators doing the "pumping" end up "dumping" when they sell their holdings.

The expanding use of the Internet and personal communication devices has made penny stock scams easier to perpetrate. It has also drawn high-profile public personalities into the sphere of regulatory oversight. Though not a scam per se, one notable example is rapper 50 Cent's use of Twitter which caused the price of a penny stock (HNHI) to increase dramatically. 50 Cent had previously invested in 30 million shares of the company and made $8.7 million in profit.

Another example of an activity that skirts the line between legitimate promotion and hype is the case of LEXG. Described (but perhaps overstated) as "the biggest stock promotion of all time", Lithium Exploration Group's market capitalization soared to over $350 million after an extensive direct mail campaign. The promotion drew upon the legitimate growth in production and use of lithium, while touting Lithium Exploration Group's position within that sector. According to the company's December 31, 2010, form 10-Q (filed within months of the direct mail promotion), LEXG was a lithium company without assets. Its revenues and assets at that time were zero. Subsequently, the company did acquire lithium production/exploration properties, and addressed concerns raised in the press.

=== Accountant fraud ===
In 2002, a wave of separate but often related accounting scandals became known to the public in the US. All of the leading public accounting firms—Arthur Andersen, Deloitte & Touche, Ernst & Young, KPMG, PricewaterhouseCoopers—and others have admitted to or have been charged with negligence in identifying and preventing the publication of falsified financial reports by their corporate clients, which had the effect of giving a misleading impression of their client companies' financial status. In several cases, the monetary amounts of the fraud involved were in the billions of dollars.

=== Boiler rooms ===
Boiler rooms or boiler houses are brokerages that put undue pressure on clients to trade, usually in pursuit of microcap fraud schemes. Some boiler rooms offer clients transactions fraudulently, such as those with an undisclosed profitable relationship with the brokerage. Some boiler rooms are not licensed but may be "tied agents" of a brokerage house which itself is licensed or not. Securities sold in boiler rooms include commodities and private placements as well as microcap stocks, non-existent, or distressed stock and stock supplied by an intermediary at an undisclosed markup.

=== Short selling abuses ===
Abusive short selling, including certain types of naked short selling, are also considered securities fraud because they can drive down stock prices. In abusive naked short selling, stock is sold without being borrowed and without any intent to borrow. The practice of spreading false information about stocks, to drive down their prices, is called "short and distort". During the takeover of Bear Stearns by J.P. Morgan Chase in March 2008, reports swirled that shorts were spreading rumors to drive down Bear Stearns' share price.

=== Ponzi schemes ===
A Ponzi scheme is an investment fund where withdrawals are financed by subsequent investors, rather than profit obtained through investment activities. The largest instance of securities fraud committed by an individual was a Ponzi scheme operated by former NASDAQ chairman Bernard Madoff, which caused up to an estimated $64.8 billion in losses depending on which method was used to calculate the losses.

== Pervasiveness of securities fraud ==
The Securities Investor Protection Corporation (SIPC) reports that the Federal Trade Commission, FBI, and state securities regulators estimate that investment fraud in the United States ranges from $10–$40 billion annually. Of that number, SIPC estimates that $1–3 billion is directly attributable to microcap stock fraud. More recent figures come from complaints filed by the public. In 2025, consumers told the Federal Trade Commission they had lost $7.9 billion to investment scams, more than to any other type of fraud, and the FBI's Internet Crime Complaint Center received 72,984 investment fraud complaints, with reported losses of $8,648,617,756.

A 2023 study by economists Alexander Dyck, Adair Morse and Luigi Zingales estimated that on average 10% of large publicly traded firms commit securities fraud every year, and that the corporate fraud destroys 1.6% of equity value each year.

Class action securities fraud lawsuits rose 43 percent between 2006 and 2007, according to the Stanford Law School Securities Class Action Clearinghouse. During 2006 and 2007, securities fraud class actions were driven by market-wide events, such as the 2006 backdating scandal and the 2007 subprime crisis. Securities fraud lawsuits remained below historical averages.

Some manifestations of this type of fraud have become more frequent as the Internet gives criminals greater access to prey. The trading volume in the United States securities and commodities markets, having grown dramatically in the 1990s, has led to an increase in fraud and misconduct by investors, corporate officers, shareholders, and other market participants.

Securities fraud is becoming more complex as the industry develops more complicated investment vehicles. In addition, white collar criminals are expanding the scope of their fraud and are looking outside the United States for new markets, new investors, and banking secrecy havens to hide unjust enrichment.

A study conducted by the New York Stock Exchange in the mid-1990s reveals approximately 51.4 million individuals owned some type of traded stock, while 200 million individuals owned securities indirectly. These same financial markets provide the opportunity for wealth to be obtained and the opportunity for white collar criminals to take advantage of unwary investors.

Recovery of assets from the proceeds of securities fraud is a resource intensive and expensive undertaking because of the cleverness of fraudsters in concealment of assets and money laundering, as well as the tendency of many criminals to be profligate spenders. A victim of securities fraud is usually fortunate to recover any money from the defrauder.

Sometimes the losses caused by securities fraud are difficult to quantify. For example, insider trading is believed to raise the cost of capital for securities issuers, thus decreasing overall economic growth.

== Characteristics of victims and perpetrators ==
Any investor can become a victim, but persons aged fifty years or older are most often victimized, whether as direct purchasers in securities or indirect purchasers through pension funds.

Potential perpetrators of securities fraud within a publicly traded firm include any dishonest official within the company who has access to the payroll or financial reports that can be manipulated to:

1. overstate assets
2. overstate revenues
3. understate costs
4. understate liabilities
5. understate penny stock

Enron Corporation exemplifies all five tendencies, and its failure demonstrates the extreme dangers of a culture of corruption within a publicly traded corporation. The rarity of such spectacular failures of a corporation from securities fraud attests to the general reliability of most executives and boards of large corporations. Most spectacular failures of publicly traded companies result from such innocent causes as marketing blunders (Schlitz), an obsolete model of business (Penn Central, Woolworth's), inadequate market share (Studebaker), non-criminal incompetence (Braniff).

== Other effects of securities fraud ==
Even if the effect of securities fraud is not enough to cause bankruptcy, a lesser level can wipe out holders of common stock because of the leverage of value of shares upon the difference between assets and liabilities. Such fraud has been known as watered stock, analogous to the practice of force-feeding livestock great amounts of water to inflate their weight before sale to dealers.

== Penny stock regulation ==
The regulation and prosecution of securities fraud violations is undertaken on a broad front, involving numerous government agencies and self-regulatory organizations. One method of regulating and restricting a specific type of fraud perpetrated by pump and dump manipulators, is to target the category of stocks most often associated with this scheme. To that end, penny stocks have been the target of heightened enforcement efforts. In the United States, regulators have defined a penny stock as a security that must meet a number of specific standards. The criteria include price, market capitalization, and minimum shareholder equity. Securities traded on a national stock exchange, regardless of price, are exempt from regulatory designation as a penny stock, since it is thought that exchange traded securities are less vulnerable to manipulation. Therefore, CitiGroup (NYSE:C) and other NYSE listed securities which traded below $1.00 during the market downturn of 2008–2009, while properly regarded as "low priced" securities, were not technically "penny stocks". Although penny stock trading in the United States is now primarily controlled through rules and regulations enforced by the United States Securities and Exchange Commission (SEC) and the Financial Industry Regulatory Authority (FINRA), the genesis of this control is found in State securities law. The State of Georgia was the first state to codify a comprehensive penny stock securities law. Secretary of State Max Cleland, whose office enforced State securities laws was a principal proponent of the legislation. Representative Chesley V. Morton, the only stockbroker in the Georgia General Assembly at the time, was principal sponsor of the bill in the House of Representatives. Georgia's penny stock law was subsequently challenged in court. However, the law was eventually upheld in U.S. District Court, and the statute became the template for laws enacted in other states. Shortly thereafter, both FINRA and the SEC enacted comprehensive revisions of their penny stock regulations. These regulations proved effective in either closing or greatly restricting broker/dealers, such as Blinder, Robinson & Company, which specialized in the penny stocks sector. Meyer Blinder was jailed for securities fraud in 1992, after the collapse of his firm. However, sanctions under these specific regulations lack an effective means to address pump and dump schemes perpetrated by unregistered groups and individuals.

== See also ==
- List of securities frauds
- Accounting scandals
- Bucket shop (stock market)
- Boiler room (business)
- Illicit financial flows
- Insider trading
- Microcap stock fraud
- Penny stock
- Pyramid scheme
- Selling away
- Valuation control
- White-collar crime
