= Charles H. Johnson =

American politician

Charles H. Johnson was an American politician. He served as a member of the 1861–1862 California State Assembly, representing the 2nd District.
