= Masters W65 1500 metres world record progression =

This is the progression of world record improvements of the 1500 metres W65 division of Masters athletics.

Key

Incomplete information Pending better indoor records

Hand	Auto	Athlete	Nationality	Birthdate	Location	Date
	5:25.65	Kathryn Martin	United States	30.09.1951	Toronto	12.08.2017
	5:25.29 i	Kathryn Martin	United States	30.09.1951	Daegu	25.03.2017
5:30.7		Angela Copson	United Kingdom	20.04.1947	Nuneaton	27.06.2012
	5:43.61	Lydia Ritter	Germany	08.11.1938	Mainz	05.06.2004
	5:46.61	Diane Palmason	Canada	15.03.1938	Seattle	26.07.2003
	5:48.48	Jeanne Daprano	United States	16.09.1936	Las Vegas	10.06.2001
	5:57.74	Melitta Czerwenka Nagel	Germany	30.04.1930	Saarbrücken	23.07.1997
	6:02.68	Shirley Brasher	Australia	06.11.1926	Melbourne	01.04.1992
	6:10.17	Britta Tibbling	Sweden	19.03.1918	Brighton	25.08.1984
