= Mun Tae-yeong =

American basketball player (born 1978)

Mun Tae-yeong 문태영
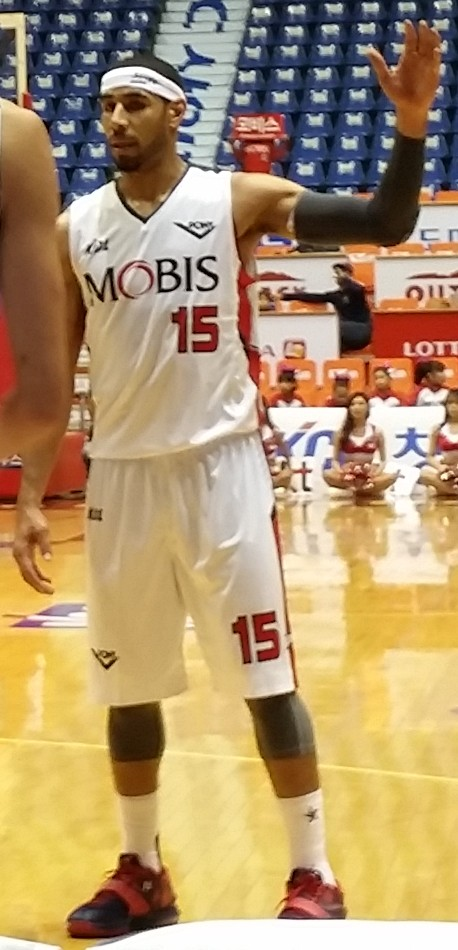
- Moon in 2014

Personal information
- Born: February 10, 1978 (age 48) Goldsboro, North Carolina, U.S.
- Listed height: 1.98 m (6 ft 6 in)
- Listed weight: 100 kg (220 lb)

Career information
- High school: Seventy-First (Fayetteville, North Carolina)
- College: Penn State (1996–1998); Richmond (1999–2001)
- NBA draft: 2001: undrafted
- Playing career: 2001–present
- Position: Small forward

Career history
- 2002: Saint-Quentin
- 2004–2005: Landstede
- 2005–2006: Rouen Métropole
- 2006: Paris-Levallois
- 2006–2007: Yakama Sun Kings
- 2007–2008: Atomerőmű SE
- 2009–2011: Piratas de Quebradillas

Career highlights
- 3× KBL champion (2013–2015); Dutch Cup winner (2008); Eredivisie All-First Team (2005); NBA D-League champion (2004); CBA champion (2007)

Mun Tae-yeong (Korean: 문태영; born as February 10, 1978 as Gregory Lee "Greg" Stevenson) is an American-born Korean basketball player. A 1.98 m (6 ft 6 in) forward, he played for the South Korea national team.

== High school and college career ==
After attending Seventy-First High School, Stevenson committed to Penn State, where he would play from 1996 to 1998. Then, he transferred to Richmond where he would spend two more seasons.

== Professional career ==
Mun started his professional career in 2001 with the German team MTV Gießen. He went on to play for several teams in different countries n the following years, including France, the Netherlands and Hungary.

Mun won a Continental Basketball Association (CBA) championship with the Yakama Sun Kings in 2007.

From 2009 to 2011, Mun represented Changwon LG Sakers of the Korean Basketball League (KBL).

In the summers, Mun represented Piratas de Quebradillas of the Puerto Rican Baloncesto Superior Nacional (BSN). He reached the BSN finals twice with the team, in both 2009 and 2011.

In 2011, he transferred to Ulsan Hyundai Mobis Phoebus where he stayed for three seasons. He won three straight championships in 2013, 2014 and 2015. From 2015 to 2020, Mun played for the Seoul Samsung Thunders.

== Personal ==
Mun has a brother, Jarod Stevenson (now known as Moon Tae-jong), who also was a professional basketball player and also adopted Korean citizenship.
