= Darnell Carter =

American football player (born 1987)

No. 57
- Position: Linebacker

Personal information
- Born: November 27, 1987 (age 38); Englewood, New Jersey, U.S.
- Listed height: 6 ft 3 in (1.91 m)
- Listed weight: 245 lb (111 kg)

Career information
- High school: Dwight Morrow (NJ)
- College: Virginia
- NFL draft: 2011: undrafted

Career history
- Iowa Barnstormers (2012–2013); Arizona Rattlers (2014); Jacksonville Sharks (2014); Iowa Barnstormers (2014)

Career AFL statistics
- Total tackles: 37
- Sacks: 4
- Forced fumbles: 1
- Fumble recoveries: 3
- Stats at ArenaFan.com

Darnell Jarod Carter (born November 27, 1987) is an American former football linebacker.

== Early life ==
Carter attended Dwight Morrow High School in Englewood, New Jersey where he participated in both football and basketball. As member of the football team, Carter played both tight end and linebacker.

College recruiting
Name	Hometown	School	Height	Weight	40^{‡}	Commit date
Darnell Carter; OLB	Englewood, New Jersey	Dwight Morrow H.S.	6 ft 3 in (1.91 m)	225 lb (102 kg)	4.7	Sep 12, 2005
Darnell Carter; OLB	Recruit ratings: Scout: Rivals: (NR)					
Overall recruit ranking: Scout: -- (LB) Rivals: -- (OLB), 30 (NJ)
Note: In many cases, Scout, Rivals, 247Sports, On3, and ESPN may conflict in their listings of height and weight.; In these cases, the average was taken. ESPN grades are on a 100-point scale.; Sources: "Virginia Football Commitment List". Rivals.; "Virginia College Football Recruiting Commits". Scout.; "Scout.com Team Recruiting Rankings". Scout.; "2006 Team Ranking". Rivals.com.

Carter committed to the University of Virginia on September 12, 2005. Carter was not heavily recruited, receiving FBS scholarships from Illinois and Virginia, as well as one FCS scholarship from Delaware.

== College career ==
Carter attended the University of Virginia, where he played as a member of the football team from 2006-2007, and 2009-2010. Carter missed the 2008 season when he was academically suspended.

== Professional career ==
=== Pre-draft ===
Prior to the 2011 NFL draft, Carter was projected to be undrafted by NFLDraftScout.com. He was rated as the 114th-best inside linebacker in the draft. He was not invited to the NFL Scouting Combine, he posted the following numbers during his Virginia pro-day workouts:

Pre-draft measurables
Height	Weight	40-yard dash	10-yard split	20-yard split	20-yard shuttle	Three-cone drill	Vertical jump	Broad jump	Bench press
6 ft 2 in (1.88 m)	244 lb (111 kg)	4.87 s	1.74 s	2.81 s	4.34 s	7.28 s	35 in (0.89 m)	10 ft 1 in (3.07 m)	18 reps
All values from 2011 Virginia Pro Day

=== Iowa Barnstomers ===
Carter was assigned the Iowa Barnstormers of the Arena Football League during the 2012 season. Carter re-signed with the Barnstormers for the 2013 season. On April 19, 2013, Carter scored his first professional touchdown, returning a Bernard Morris fumble for a touchdown. After the 2013 season, Carter was named the Barnstormers' Special Teams Player of the Year. Carter was assigned to the Barnstormers again on January 2, 2014.

=== Arizona Rattlers ===
On February 17, 2014, Carter was traded to the Arizona Rattlers in exchange for Cody Johnson.

=== Jacksonville Sharks ===
On March 1, 2014, Carter was traded to the Jacksonville Sharks for future considerations.

=== Return to Iowa ===
On May 28, 2014, Carter was traded back to Iowa for future considerations.
