= Masters W65 3000 metres world record progression =

This is the progression of world record improvements of the 3000 metres W65 division of Masters athletics. Records must be set in properly conducted, official competitions under the standing IAAF rules unless modified by World Masters Athletics. The W65 division consists of female athletes who have reached the age of 65 but have not yet reached the age of 70, so exactly from their 65th birthday to the day before their 70th birthday.

Key

Incomplete information Pending better indoor records

Hand	Auto	Athlete	Nationality	Birthdate	Age	Location	Date	Ref
	11:19.82	Maryse Le Gallo	France	27 April 1960	65 years, 49 days	Auray	4 May 2025	
	11:33.78	Mariko Yugeta	Japan	13 May 1958	65 years, 176 days	Misato	5 November 2023	
11:42.8 h		Kathryn Martin	United States	30 September 1951	65 years, 338 days	Alexandria	3 September 2017	
	11:35.98 i	Kathryn Martin	United States	30 September 1951	65 years, 173 days	Daegu	22 March 2017	
11:48.2 h		Angela Copson	Great Britain	20 April 1947	65 years, 96 days	Oxford	25 July 2012	
	12:07.18	Theresia Baird	Australia	1 October 1941	65 years, 205 days	Springvale	24 April 2007	
	12:17.49	Lydia Ritter	Germany	8 November 1938	65 years, 215 days	Neuwied	10 June 2004	
12:38.7 h		Birgitta Eklund	Sweden	3 February 1938	65 years, 141 days	Umeå	24 June 2003	
	12:47.35	Bruna Miniotti	Italy	30 January 1936	65 years, 229 days	Ostia	16 September 2001	
12:55.5 h		Bruna Miniotti	Italy	30 January 1936	65 years, 145 days	Bellinzago Novarese	24 June 2001	
	13:12.60	Mirka Mettifogo	Italy	10 April 1926	67 years, 98 days	Santhià	17 July 1993	
	13:44.70	Mirka Mettifogo	Italy	10 April 1926	65 years, 193 days	Foligno	20 October 1991	
