= Charles Willis Johnson =

Dr. Charles Willis Johnson was the Dean of the University of Washington Pharmacy Department from 1903 to 1939. C.W. Johnson is credited for bringing the School of Pharmacy from a small struggling department to a successful doctorate program. He oversaw the creation of Bagley Hall, which was built by the Public Works Administration during the Great Depression. Johnson also supported the growth of the Medicinal Herb Garden on campus, which is still one of the most extensive medicinal herb gardens in the Northwest.
