= Charles E. Johnson (FBI Most Wanted fugitive) =

American burglar

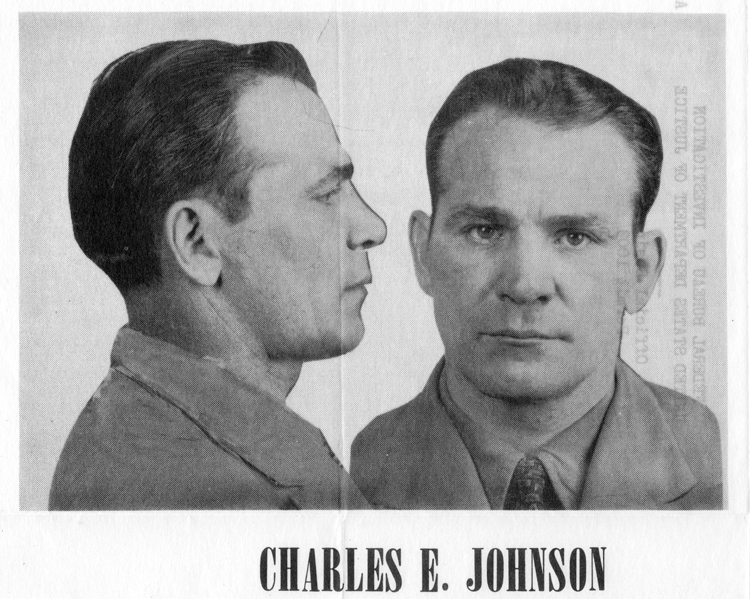
- Wanted picture

FBI Ten Most Wanted Fugitive
- Charges: Bank robbery
- Alias: Edward Clark, Jack Clark, Jack Edwards

Description
- Born: February 22, 1907; Middlesbrough, England

Status
- Penalty: 4 to 8 years imprisonment
- Status: deceased
- Added: November 12, 1953
- Number: 61
- Captured

Charles E. Johnson (February 22, 1907 – May 2, 1954) was a New York burglar who was listed on the FBI's Ten Most Wanted during 1953. He was a professional boxer. While still a teenager, Johnson was first arrested for burglary in 1921. He continued committing burglary and armed robbery throughout the 1920s until his eventual arrest in 1934 after a robbery in New York. Sentenced to serve four to eight years imprisonment, he was transferred to Dannemora Prison after he shot a police officer during a failed jailbreak from Sing Sing Prison. Although released briefly for six months, he remained imprisoned from 1935 until 1952.

== Disappearance ==
Within a year, however, Johnson was on the run from New York authorities after violating his parole for the third time. On August 28, he and four others robbed a bank robber of $5,000 from a previous bank robbery in Lakesville, North Carolina committed four months earlier. Following the bank robber's arrest, he implicated Johnson and the others and, as a result of federal statutes, made their robbery a federal offense with Johnson officially placed on the Ten Most Wanted List on November 12, 1953.

== Capture and aftermath ==
Federal agents managed to track Johnson down six weeks later when a local resident of Central Islip, New York recognized Johnson from his photo in a recent magazine article. With local police officers, his ranch-style home was raided at around midnight on December 28, 1953. Taken into custody with little incident, Johnson was convicted at his trial for a third and final time. He died of lung cancer at Bellevue Hospital in New York on May 2, 1954.
