= Charles R. Johnson (California merchant) =

American politician

Charles Robinson Johnson (1830–1904) was a merchant in California who traded his goods from sailing vessels up and down the coast of both California and Mexico. He was a member of the Los Angeles Common Council, the governing body of that city, and was the Los Angeles County clerk.

== Personal ==
Johnson was born in 1830 in Marblehead, Massachusetts.

Before his marriage, Johnson was known as "a famous playboy"; in 1851, he was married to Dolores Bandini, daughter of Juan Bandini, in San Diego, and they had one child, Charles A. Johnson. They lived for eighteen years at 451 South Main Street, the site of the future Rosslyn Hotel, then moved to 112 East 12th Street.

Johnson was stricken with apoplexy and died March 25, 1904. Interment was at New Calvary Cemetery.

== Vocation ==
When still a teenager, Johnson sailed in 1847 with a cargo of merchandise around Cape Horn to San Francisco, and for almost four years he sold his goods along the Pacific Coast. He settled in Los Angeles and, with John B.Wheeler, opened a general merchandise store. "The town at that time consisted of a handful of houses gathered around the old Plaza, and the Johnson and Wheeler store was considered a pretentious establishment."

In 1850 he was one of the investors in an artesian well company that would bore for water on the beach in San Diego.

During the French intervention in Mexico (1861–67), Johnson again went to sea with a trading vessel that supplied Mexican ports along the coast. He then made an "extensive tour through the interior, under the protection of" General Ignacio Pesqueira, at that time the governor of Sonora.

At one time he was a cattle auctioneer.

== Politics ==
Johnson was elected Los Angeles County clerk. During the administration of President Rutherford B. Hayes (1877–1881), he was named registrar of the land office, a position he held for five years.

=== Common Council ===
Johnson was elected on December 13, 1886, to represent the 3rd ward on the Los Angeles Common Council, and he was reelected on December 5, 1887, but he resigned in midterm—on March 12, 1888.

== References and notes ==
- Access to the Los Angeles Times links may require the use of a LAPL library card.
