= Daegu Athletics Promotion Center =

Event venue in Daegu, South Korea

- Daegu APC
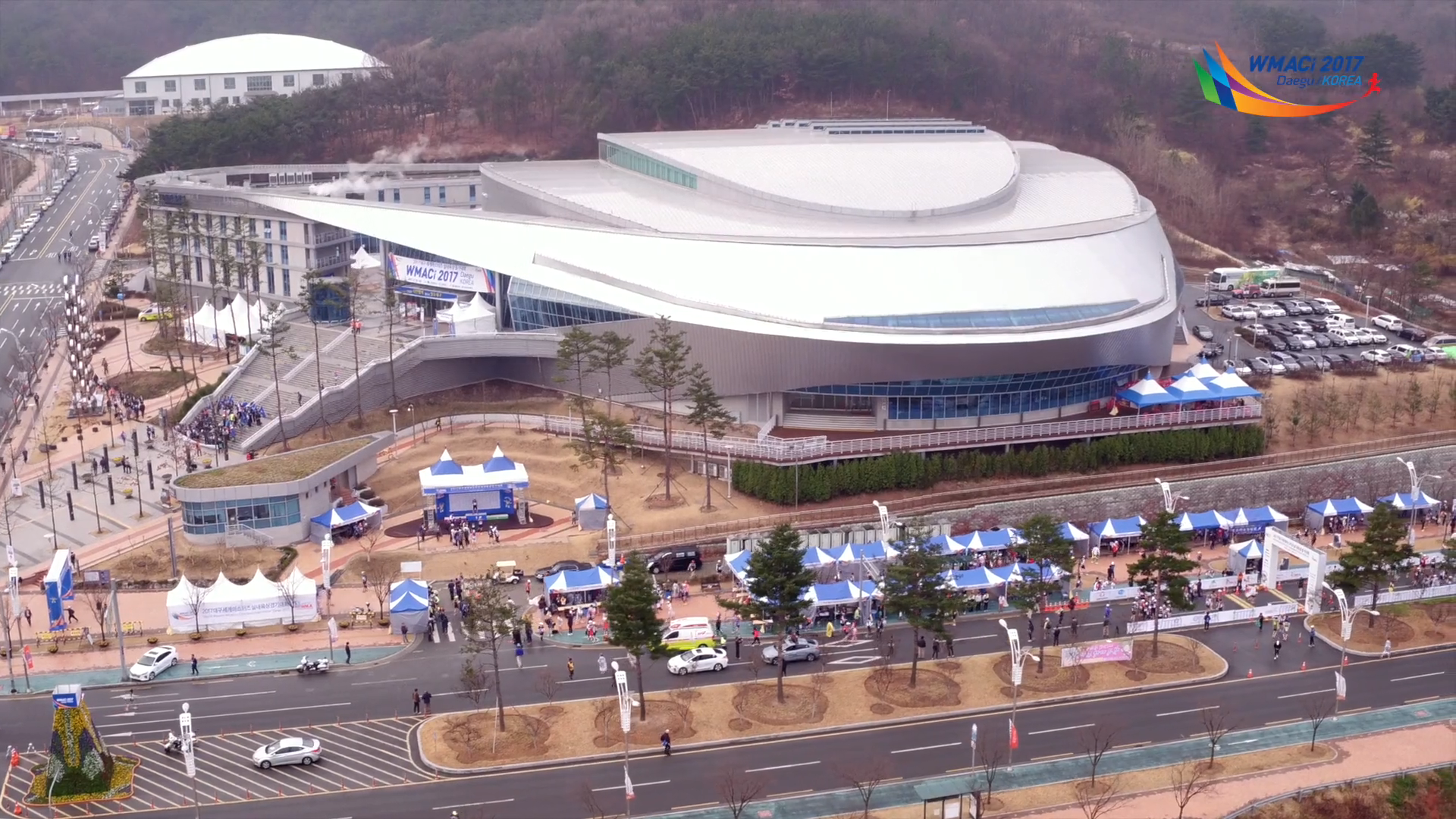
- Interactive map of Daegu Athletics Promotion Center
- Location: Daegu, South Korea
- Coordinates: 35.8282797°N 128.6767949°E
- Owner: Daegu Metropolitan City
- Capacity: 5000 seats, 6000 people

Construction
- Built: 2010-2013

Daegu Athletics Promotion Center (Daegu APC, Korean: 대구육상진흥센터) is multi-purpose indoor sports facility located in Daegu Sports Park, Daegu, South Korea.

The building has a design motif of "V" (Victory) and primarily serves as an athletics training and competition venue; portable flooring allows the facility to be used for other events such as badminton, volleyball, basketball, and dance sports. The arena is equipped with a 6-lane 200m banked track where the turns are raised to neutralize the centrifugal force of athletes running the curves. This track has no bounce even on the high curves, as is often found in older portable tracks.

The city of Daegu succeeded in its bidding to host the 2011 World Championships in Athletics, which was an outdoor competition that took place in adjacent Daegu Stadium, from 27 August to 4 September 2011. One of the legacies from this Championships was the construction of a new indoor arena, the APC, originally scheduled to be completed by the end of 2011.

Delays in construction pushed the final completion to December 2013, mainly due to lack of a 150-meter warm-up facility as required by International Association of Athletics Federations. The warm-up track was eventually built a short distance away from the APC in 2016.

The new APC hosted the 2017 World Masters Athletics Indoor Championships.

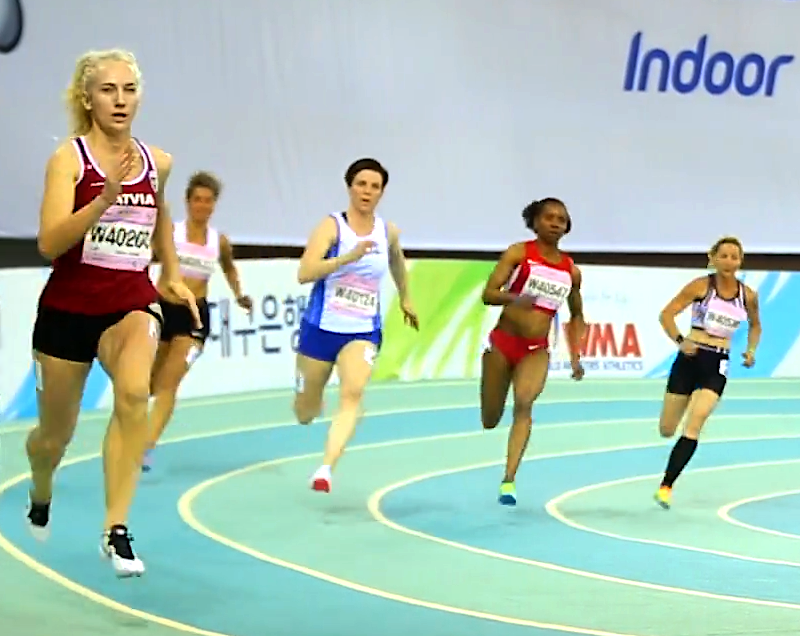
W40 200m at 2017 WMACi
