= Charles Johnson (arena football) =

American football player (born 1983)

No. 77
- Position: Defensive line

Personal information
- Born: January 5, 1983 (age 43)
- Listed height: 6 ft 2 in (1.88 m)
- Listed weight: 330 lb (150 kg)

Career information
- College: Northern Iowa

Career history
- Iowa Barnstormers (2008–2012)

Career AFL statistics
- Total tackles: 81
- Sacks: 18
- Forced fumbles: 5
- Stats at ArenaFan.com

Charles Johnson (born January 5, 1983) is an American former professional football player.
