= Charles R. Johnson Jr. =

American politician

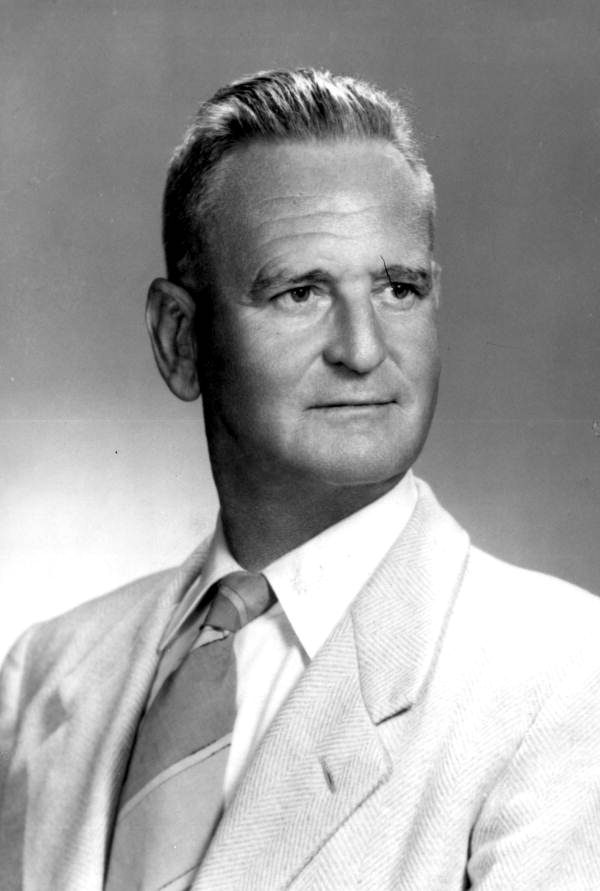
- Johnson in 1955

Member of the Florida House of Representatives from Pinellas County
- In office 1955–1956

Personal details
- Born: April 3, 1894 Washington, D.C.
- Died: Unknown
- Party: Republican

Charles R. Johnson Jr. (born April 3, 1894) was an American politician. He served as a Republican member of the Florida House of Representatives.

== Life and career ==
Johnson was born in Washington, D.C.

Johnson served in the Florida House of Representatives from 1955 to 1956.
