= Charles Johnston (athlete) =

British athlete

Personal information
- Full name: Charles Howard Johnston
- Nationality: British
- Born: 1 September 1903 Thorntonhall, Scotland
- Died: 1999 (aged 95–96)

Sport
- Sport: Athletics
- Event: Long-distance running

Charles Johnston (1 September 1903 – 1999) was a British athlete who competed at the 1924 Summer Olympics.
