= Chuck Johnson (American football) =

American football player (born 1969)

No. 66
- Position: Offensive lineman

Personal information
- Born: May 22, 1969 (age 57); Freeport, Texas, U.S.
- Listed height: 6 ft 5 in (1.96 m)
- Listed weight: 275 lb (125 kg)

Career information
- High school: Brazosport (Freeport)
- College: Texas (1987–1991)
- NFL draft: 1992: 4th round, 110th overall pick

Career history
- Denver Broncos (1992); New York Giants (1994)*; Denver Broncos (1995)*; Houston Oilers (1995)*
- * Offseason or practice squad member only

Career NFL statistics
- Games played: 16
- Stats at Pro Football Reference

Charles Ray Johnson Jr. (born May 22, 1969) is an American former professional football player who was an offensive lineman for one season with the Denver Broncos of the National Football League (NFL). He played college football for the Texas Longhorns and was selected by the Broncos in the fourth round of the 1992 NFL draft.

== Early life and college ==
Charles Ray Johnson Jr. was born on May 22, 1969, in Freeport, Texas. He attended Brazosport High School in Freeport.

He was a member of the Texas Longhorns of the University of Texas at Austin from 1987 to 1991. He was redshirted in 1987 and was a four-year letterman from 1988 to 1991.

== Professional career ==
Johnson was selected by the Denver Broncos in the fourth round, with the 110th overall pick, of the 1992 NFL draft. He officially signed with the team on July 18. He played in all 16 games for the Broncos during the 1992 season. He was released on September 7, 1993.

Johnson signed with the New York Giants on April 5, 1994, but was later released on August 22, 1994.

On February 20, 1995, Johnson was selected by the Scottish Claymores of the World League of American Football. He was signed by the Broncos again on April 18, 1995. He was released on May 31, 1995.

Johnson signed with the Houston Oilers on July 21, 1995. He was released on August 22, 1995.

== Personal life ==
Johnson has worked as a lawyer after his football career. He was granted his law license in 2000. In 2018, he ran for Harris County, Texas state district judge.
