= Chuckie Johnson =

American football player (born 1969)

No. 72, 99
- Position: Defensive tackle

Personal information
- Born: March 5, 1969 (age 57); Fayetteville, North Carolina, U.S.
- Listed height: 6 ft 4 in (1.93 m)
- Listed weight: 310 lb (141 kg)

Career information
- High school: Seventy-First (Fayetteville)
- College: Auburn (1989–1992)
- NFL draft: 1993: undrafted

Career history
- Phoenix/Arizona Cardinals (1993); Barcelona Dragons (1995); Rhein Fire (1996)
- Stats at Pro Football Reference

Charles Lewis Johnson (born March 5, 1969) is an American former professional football player who was a defensive tackle for one season with the Phoenix Cardinals of the National Football League (NFL). He played college football for the Auburn Tigers. He was also a member of the Barcelona Dragons and Rhein Fire of the World League of American Football (WLAF).

== Early life and college ==
Charles Lewis Johnson was born on March 5, 1969, in Fayetteville, North Carolina. He attended Seventy-First High School in Fayetteville.

He lettered for the Auburn Tigers from 1989 to 1992.

== Professional career ==
After going undrafted in the 1993 NFL draft, Johnson signed with the Phoenix Cardinals on May 10. He was waived on August 30 and signed to the team's practice squad the next day. He was promoted to the active roster on September 15 and played in five games for the Cardinals during the 1993 season. He was released by the newly renamed Arizona Cardinals on August 26, 1994.

Johnson played for the Barcelona Dragons of the World League of American Football (WLAF) in 1995, and the Rhein Fire of the WLAF in 1996.
