= Frederick Franklin =

United States Navy Medal of Honor recipient

Frederick H. Franklin
- Medal of Honor recipient
- Born: 1840; Portsmouth, New Hampshire, US
- Died: May 10 1873 (aged 32–33); Portsmouth, New Hampshire, US
- Burial place: Proprietors' Cemetery Portsmouth, New Hampshire
- Military career
- Allegiance: United States
- Branch: United States Navy
- Rank: Quartermaster
- Unit: USS Colorado (1856)
- Conflicts: Ganghwa Island, Korean Expedition
- Awards: Medal of Honor

Frederick H. Franklin (1840 – May 10, 1873) was a United States Navy sailor who received the Medal of Honor for actions during the 1871 Korean Campaign.

== Biography ==
Frederick H. Franklin was born in 1840 in Portsmouth, New Hampshire.

He, along with Boatswains Mate Alexander MacKenzie, Marine Private John Coleman, Ordinary Seaman Samuel F. Rogers and fellow Quartermaster William Troy in the attempt to save the life of Lieutenant Hugh McKee, who was mortally wounded in the action. Lieutenant McKee was not eligible for the medal as an officer.

He is buried in Proprietors' Cemetery, Portsmouth, New Hampshire.

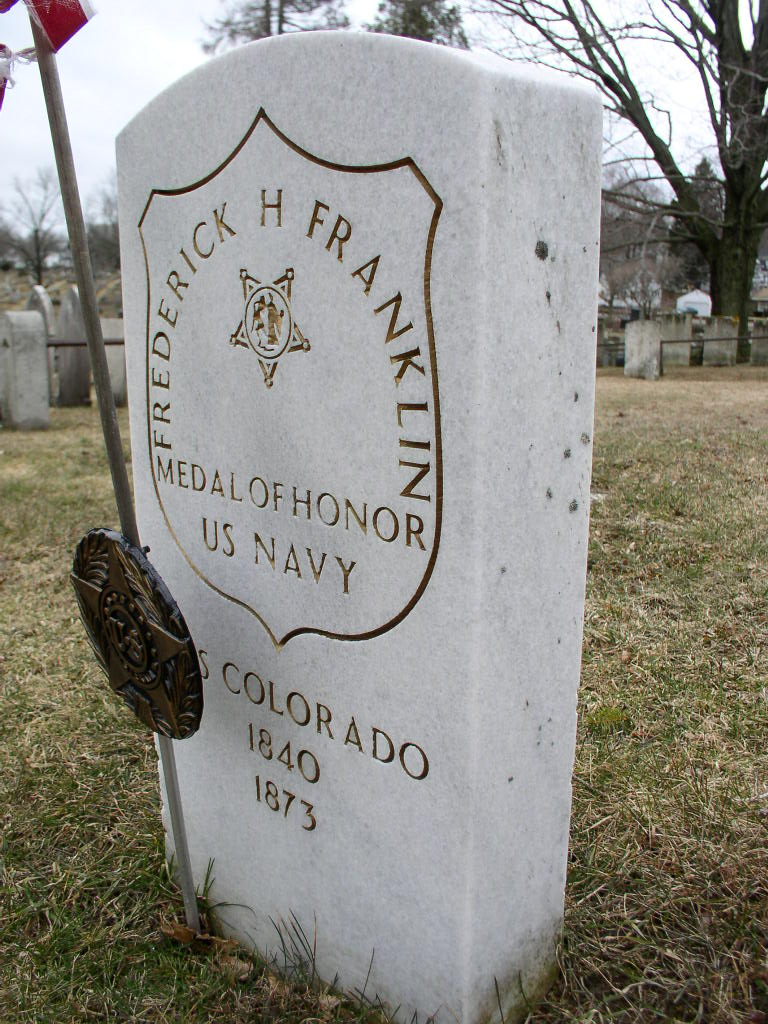
Grave in Portsmouth, New Hampshire

== Medal of Honor citation ==
Rank and organization: Quartermaster, U.S. Navy. Born: 1840, Portsmouth, N.H. Accredited to: New Hampshire. G.O. No.: 169, February 8, 1872.

Citation:

On board the U.S.S. Colorado during the attack and capture of the Korean forts on 11 June 1871. Assuming command of Company D, after Lt. McKee was wounded, Franklin handled the company with great credit until relieved.

== See also ==
- List of Medal of Honor recipients
