= USS McKee =

Four ships of the United States Navy have been named USS McKee.

Three were named in honor of Lt. Hugh W. McKee:

- USS McKee (TB-18), was a Dahlgren-class torpedo boat from 1898 to 1912
- USS McKee (DD-87), was a Wickes-class destroyer during World War I
- USS McKee (DD-575), was a Fletcher-class destroyer during World War II

The fourth was named in honor of RADM Andrew McKee:

- USS McKee (AS-41), was an Emory S. Land-class submarine tender launched in 1980 and decommissioned in 1999
