= List of Medal of Honor recipients =

The Medal of Honor was created during the American Civil War and is the highest military decoration presented by the United States government to a member of its armed forces. Recipients must have distinguished themselves at the risk of their own lives above and beyond the call of duty in action against an enemy of the United States. Due to the nature of this medal, it is commonly presented posthumously. The President of the United States, in the name of the United States Congress, has awarded more than 3,520 Medals of Honor, including 19 second awards, to the nation's soldiers, sailors, airmen, marines, and coast guardsmen since the decoration's creation in 1861.

The citations highlighting acts of gallantry that received the Medal of Honor have been and continue to be regularly released by book publishers. After the Second World War, both the Army and Navy produced hardbound Medal of Honor compilations. Between 1964 and 1979, the United States Senate Subcommittee on Veterans' Affairs of the Committee on Labor and Public Welfare and later the Committee on Veterans' Affairs produced a number of consolidated compilations of all Medal of Honor citations to date. Additions and changes to the list of recipients of the medal since 1979 have been regularly published by the Congressional Research Service.

The first Army Medal of Honor was awarded to Private Jacob Parrott during the American Civil War for his role in the Great Locomotive Chase.

Bernard John Dowling Irwin was the first (chronologically by action) Medal of Honor recipient during the Apache Wars. His actions on February 13, 1861, are the earliest for which the Medal of Honor was awarded.

The first African American recipient for this award was Robert Blake, who manned his post during a naval engagement against infantry while under heavy fire (William Harvey Carney is commonly and erroneously cited as the first African-American to receive a medal because his actions in combat did precede those of the other African-American recipients, although his physical medal was not presented until 1900). The only female Medal of Honor recipient is Mary Edwards Walker, a Civil War surgeon. Her medal was rescinded in 1917 along with many other non-combat awards, but it was restored by the Army Board for Correction of Military Records in 1977.

While current law, (10 U.S.C. § 6241), beginning in 1918, explicitly states that recipients must be serving in the U.S. Armed Forces at the time of performing a valorous act that warrants the award, exceptions have been made. Notably, Charles Lindbergh, while a reserve member of the U.S. Army Air Corps, received his Medal of Honor as a civilian pilot. Although Medals of Honor can only be awarded to members of the U.S. Armed Forces, being a U.S. citizen is not a prerequisite for eligibility to receive the medal. Sixty-one Canadians who were serving in the United States Armed Forces have received the Medal of Honor; most received it for actions in the American Civil War. Since 1900, only four have been awarded to Canadians. In the Vietnam War, Peter C. Lemon was the only Canadian-born recipient of the Medal of Honor. However, he was a U.S. citizen.

== 19th century ==
=== American Civil War ===
The American Civil War (1861–1865) was a war between the United States (the Union) and the Southern states of the newly formed Confederate States of America under Jefferson Davis. The Medal of Honor was established during this conflict; 1523 were awarded (33 posthumously) for acts of bravery and gallantry in combat. Most awards were granted after the end of the Civil War with two late awards to Andrew Jackson Smith and Alonzo Cushing in 2001 and 2014.

=== Indian Wars ===
The term Indian Wars is the name generally used in the United States to describe a series of conflicts between colonial or federal governments and the American Indian population resident in North America before the arrival of settlers. During this conflict the Medal of Honor was presented to 426 soldiers, 13 posthumously for acts of bravery and gallantry in combat.

=== Korean Expedition ===
The United States expedition to Korea in 1871, also known as Shinmiyangyo (Western Disturbance of the Shinmi (1871) year), was the first American military action in Korea. It took place predominantly on and around the Korean island of Ganghwa. The reason for the presence of the American military expeditionary force in Korea was to support an American diplomatic delegation sent to establish trade and diplomatic relations with Korea and to ascertain the fate of the General Sherman merchant ship. The isolationist nature of the Joseon Dynasty government and the assertiveness of the Americans led to an armed conflict between the two parties. Eventually, the United States failed to secure its objectives.

Image	Name	Service	Rank	Place of action	Date of action	Unit	Notes
—	John Andrews	Navy	Ordinary Seaman	aboard USS Benicia	June 9, 1871 – June 10, 1871	USS Benicia	Stood on the gunwale on the Benicia's launch, lashed to the ridgerope and remained unflinchingly in this dangerous position and gave his soundings with coolness and accuracy under a heavy fire.
(Brown at right)	Charles Brown	Marine Corps	Corporal	aboard USS Colorado	June 11, 1871	USS Colorado	Assisted in capturing the Korean flag from the citadel of the fort
—	John Coleman	Marine Corps	Private	aboard USS Colorado	June 11, 1871	USS Colorado	For hand-to-hand combat and saving the life of Alexander McKenzie
—	James Dougherty	Marine Corps	Private	aboard USS Benicia	June 11, 1871	USS Benicia	Returned to duty after being wounded several times
—	Frederick Franklin	Navy	Quartermaster	aboard USS Colorado	June 11, 1871	USS Colorado	For assuming command of Company D, after Lt. McKee was wounded, and handling the company until relieved
—	Patrick H. Grace	Navy	Chief Quartermaster	aboard USS Benicia	June 10, 1871 – June 11, 1871	USS Benicia	Carrying out his duties with coolness, Grace set forth gallant and meritorious conduct throughout this action
(Hayden at left)	Cyrus Hayden	Navy	Carpenter	aboard USS Colorado	June 11, 1871	USS Colorado	Serving as color bearer of the battalion, Hayden planted his flag and protected it under heavy fire
Head and shoulders of an otherwise-cleancut man with an enormous mustache, in circa-1900 formal dress.	William F. Lukes	Navy	Landsman	Ganghwa Island	June 9, 1871 – June 10, 1871	USS Colorado	Fighting the enemy inside the fort, Lukes received a severe cut over the head
—	Alexander McKenzie	Navy	Boatswain's Mate	aboard USS Colorado	June 11, 1871	USS Colorado	Fighting at the side of Lt. McKee during this action, McKenzie was struck by a sword and received a severe cut in the head from the blow.
—	Michael McNamara	Marine Corps	Private	aboard USS Benicia	June 11, 1871	USS Benicia	For taking a match-lock from the hands of the enemy while advancing to the parapet
—	James F. Merton	Navy	Landsman	Ganghwa Island	June 9, 1871 – June 10, 1871	USS Colorado	Merton was severely wounded in the arm while trying to force his way into the fort
—	Michael Owens	Marine Corps	Private	aboard USS Colorado	June 11, 1871	USS Colorado	Fighting courageously in hand-to-hand combat, Owens was badly wounded by the enemy during this action
(Purvis in center)	Hugh Purvis	Marine Corps	Private	aboard USS Alaska	June 11, 1871	USS Alaska	Braving the enemy fire, Purvis was the first to scale the walls of the fort and capture their flag
—	Samuel F. Rogers	Navy	Quartermaster	aboard USS Colorado	June 11, 1871	USS Colorado	Fighting courageously at the side of Lt. McKee during this action, Rogers was wounded by the enemy
—	William Troy	Navy	Ordinary Seaman	aboard USS Colorado	June 11, 1871	USS Colorado	Fighting at the side of Lt. McKee, by whom he was especially commended, Troy was badly wounded by the enemy

=== Spanish–American War ===
The Spanish–American War (Spanish: Guerra Hispano-Estadounidense, desastre del 98, Guerra Hispano-Cubana-Norteamericana or Guerra de Cuba) was a military conflict between Spain and the United States that began in April 1898. Hostilities halted in August of that year, and the Treaty of Paris was signed in December. The war began after the American demand for Spain's peacefully resolving the Cuban fight for independence was rejected, though strong expansionist sentiment in the United States may have motivated the government to target Spain's remaining overseas territories: Cuba, Puerto Rico, the Philippines, Guam and the Caroline Islands.

Riots in Havana by pro-Spanish "Voluntarios" gave the United States reason to send in the warship USS Maine. This action by the U.S. indicated high national interest. Tension among the American people was raised because of the explosion of USS Maine, and "yellow journalism" - sensationalist reporting that exposed Spain's extensive atrocities, agitating American public opinion. The war ended after decisive naval victories for the United States in the Philippines and Cuba. The Treaty of Paris ended the conflict 109 days after the outbreak of war giving the United States ownership of the former Spanish colonies of Puerto Rico, the Philippines and Guam. The Medal of Honor from the Spanish–American War was presented to 111 people.

=== Samoan Civil War ===
The Samoan Civil War(s) occurred in the Samoa Islands of the South Pacific in the late 19th century. The Samoan Civil Wars were a series of conflicts between Germany, the United Kingdom, and the United States, ending in the partitioning of the island chain in 1899. The concluding event was the Second Samoan Civil War. The first Samoan Civil War lasted for eight years. The warring Samoan parties were supplied with arms, training and sometimes even combat troops by Germany, Britain and the United States. These three powers valued Samoa as a refueling station for coal fired shipping. In addition, these countries sought to gain more power in Europe and wanted Samoa due to the scarcity of unclaimed territory from 1870 onwards.

Image	Name	Service	Rank	Place of action	Date of action	Unit	Notes
—	Frederick T. Fisher	Navy	Gunner's Mate First Class	aboard USS Philadelphia, Samoa	April 1, 1899	USS Philadelphia	For distinguishing himself by his conduct in the presence of the enemy
	Bruno A. Forsterer	Marine Corps	Sergeant	Samoa	April 1, 1899	Unknown	For distinguished conduct in the presence of the enemy.
Top half of man in formal 1900s military dress, wearing a star-shaped medal on a ribbon around his neck.	Henry L. Hulbert	Marine Corps	Private	Samoa	April 1, 1899	Unknown	For distinguished conduct in the presence of the enemy. Subsequently, awarded the Navy Cross and the Distinguished Service Cross for actions during World War I.
—	Michael J. McNally	Marine Corps	Sergeant	Samoa	April 1, 1899	Unknown	For distinguished conduct in the presence of the enemy

=== Philippine-American War ===
The Philippine–American War (Note: The Philippine–American War is usually known as the Philippine Insurrection. This name was historically the most commonly used in the U.S., but some Filipino historians refer to these hostilities as the Philippine-American War, and, in 1999, the U.S. Library of Congress reclassified its references to use this term. Most historians continue to refer to the Insurrection.) was an armed military conflict between the United States and Filipino nationalists who established the "First Philippine Republic", fought between 1899 and at least 1902, which arose from a Filipino political struggle against U.S. occupation of the Philippines. While the conflict was officially declared over on July 4, 1902, American troops continued hostilities against remnants of the "Philippine Army" and other insurgent groups until 1913, and some historians consider these unofficial mop-up operations part of the war.

Eighty-six men were awarded the Medal of Honor for their actions in the Philippine–American War: 70 from the Army, 10 from the Navy, and six from the Marine Corps. Four of the awards were posthumous. Among the recipients were Webb Hayes, the son of former U.S. President Rutherford B. Hayes, and two prominent Marine Corps officers, Hiram I. Bearss and David Dixon Porter. Bearss became known for leading long-range reconnaissance patrols behind enemy lines and was later wounded as a colonel in World War I. Porter was from a distinguished military family and rose to become a major general. José B. Nísperos, a member of the Philippine Scouts who was honored for continuing to fight after being wounded, was the first Asian recipient of the Medal of Honor.

=== Boxer Rebellion ===
The Boxer Movement or Boxer Rebellion, which occurred in China from November 1899 to September 7, 1901, was an uprising by members of the Chinese Society of Right and Harmonious Fists against foreign influence in areas, politics, religion and technology that occurred in China during the final years of the Manchu rule (Qing Dynasty). The members of the Society of Right and Harmonious Fists were simply called boxers by the Westerners due to the martial arts and calisthenics they practiced. The uprising began as a xenophobic, anti-foreign, nationalist peasant-based movement in northern China. They attacked foreigners who were building railroads and supposedly violating Feng shui, as well as Christians, who were held responsible for the foreigners in China. In June 1900, the Boxers invaded Beijing and killed 230 non-Chinese. Tens of thousands of Chinese Christians, Catholic and Protestant alike, were killed mostly in Shandong and Shanxi Provinces as part of the uprising. This drew criticism from many Chinese, including Chinese Christian Sun Yat-Sen (later to help overthrow the Manchu dynasty in 1911 and become first president of the Republic of China). The government of Empress Dowager Cixi was not helpful, and diplomats, foreign civilians, soldiers and some Chinese Christians retreated to the legation quarter where they held out for 55 days until a multinational coalition rushed 20,000 troops to their rescue. The Chinese government was forced to indemnify the victims and make many additional concessions. Subsequent reforms implemented after the crisis of 1900 laid the foundation for the end of the Qing Dynasty and the establishment of the modern Chinese Republic.

During the Boxer rebellion, 59 American servicemen received the Medal of Honor for their actions. Four of these were for Army personnel, 22 went to Navy sailors and the remaining 33 went to Marines. Harry Fisher was the first Marine to receive the medal posthumously and the only posthumous recipient for this conflict.

== 20th century ==
=== United States occupation of Veracruz, 1914 ===
The United States occupation of the Mexican port of Veracruz lasted for six months in response to the Tampico Affair of April 9, 1914. The incident came in the midst of poor diplomatic relations between Mexico and the United States, related to the ongoing Mexican Revolution.

Secretary of the Navy Josephus Daniels ordered that 56 Medals of Honor be awarded to participants in the occupation of Veracruz, the most for any single action before or since. In total 63 Medals of Honor were received for actions during the occupation: one Army, nine to members of the United States Marine Corps, and 53 to Navy personnel.

=== Invasion and occupation of Haiti ===
The first United States occupation of Haiti began on July 28, 1915, and ended in mid-August 1934.

Portrait	Name	Service	Rank	Place of action	Date of action	Unit	Notes
Head and shoulders of man in his 40s wearing a U.S. Marine uniform with ribbons, circa 1920.	Smedley Butler	Marine Corps	Major	Fort Riviere, Haiti	November 17, 1915	2nd Marines	Second award – previously awarded a Medal of Honor for action in the Mexican Campaign.
Head and shoulders of a U.S. Marine wearing a 1920s flat-brimmed campaign hat in bright sun.	William R. Button	Marine Corps	Corporal	near Grande Riviere, Haiti	Oct 31, 1919 – Nov 1, 1919	7th Marines	For the assassination of rebel leader Charlemagne Péralte and the routing of his followers
Top half of a serious man in formal 1920s U.S. military dress wearing two star-shaped medals on ribbons around his neck.	Daniel Daly	Marine Corps	Gunnery Sergeant	near Fort-Liberté, Haiti	October 24, 1915	15th Company, 2nd Marines	Second award – previously awarded a Medal of Honor for action in the Boxer Rebellion
Top half of man in 1920s tropical U.S. Marine uniform with flat-brimmed campaign hat.	Herman H. Hanneken	Marine Corps	Sergeant	near Grande Riviere, Haiti	Oct 31, 1919 – Nov 1, 1919	7th Marines	For the assassination of rebel leader Charlemagne Péralte and the routing of his followers
Head and shoulder of man with jutting jaw in circa 1920 U.S. Marine uniform.	Ross L. Iams	Marine Corps	Sergeant	Fort Riviere, Haiti	November 17, 1915	5th Company, 2nd Marines	Approaching a breach in the wall which was the only entrance to the fort, Sergeant Iams unhesitatingly jumped through the breach despite constant fire from the Cacos and engaged the enemy in a desperate hand-to-hand combat until the bastion was captured and Caco resistance neutralized.
—	Samuel Marguiles	Marine Corps	Private	Fort Riviere, Haiti	November 17, 1915	23rd Company, 2nd Marines	Served under the name Samuel Gross.
Side profile of head and chest of older, plump man in dress U.S. Marine uniform.	Edward A. Ostermann	Marine Corps	First Lieutenant	near Fort-Liberté, Haiti	October 24, 1915	15th Company, 2nd Marines	In command of one of the three squads which advanced in three different directions, led his men forward, surprising and scattering the Cacos, and aiding in the capture of Fort Dipitie.
Young man with slicked-down short hair in a circa 1915 U.S. Marine uniform with a very high collar.	William P. Upshur	Marine Corps	Captain	near Fort-Liberté, Haiti	October 24, 1915	15th Company, 2nd Marines	In command of the three squads which advanced in three different directions, led his men forward, surprising and scattering the Cacos, and aiding the capture of Fort Dipitie.

=== Occupation of the Dominican Republic ===
The United States occupied the Dominican Republic from 1916 to 1924. In May 1917, Rear Admiral William Caperton forced Arias to leave Santo Domingo by threatening the city with naval bombardment. U.S. Marines invaded and took control of the country within two months; in November that same year, the U.S. imposed a military government. The Marines restored order throughout most of the republic (with the exception of the eastern region); the country's budget was balanced, its debt was diminished, and economic growth resumed; infrastructure projects produced new roads that linked all the country's regions for the first time in its history; a professional military organization, the Dominican Constabulary Guard, replaced the partisan forces that had waged a seemingly endless struggle for power.

Image	Name	Service	Rank	Place of action	Date of action	Unit	Notes
Head and shoulders of square-jawed man in circa 1920 formal U.S. Marine uniform.	Joseph A. Glowin	Marine Corps	Corporal	Guayacanes, Dominican Republic	July 3, 1916	13th Company, Artillery Battalion, 1st Brigade	For action against a considerable force of rebels
Head and shoulders of square-jawed man in circa 1920 formal U.S. Marine uniform.	Ernest C. Williams	Marine Corps	First Lieutenant	San Francisco de Macorís, Dominican Republic	November 29, 1916	1st Brigade	For leading the capture of a fort
Head and shoulders of man in circa 1920 U.S. Marine dress uniform, wearing a star-shaped medal hanging from a ribbon under his collar.	Roswell Winans	Marine Corps	First Sergeant	Guayacanes, Dominican Republic	July 3, 1916	1st Brigade	For action against a considerable force of rebels

=== World War I ===
World War I, also known as the First World War and the Great War, was a global military conflict which took place primarily in Europe from 1914 to 1918. Over 40 million casualties resulted, including approximately 20 million military and civilian deaths. Over 60 million European soldiers were mobilized from 1914 to 1918. The immediate cause of the war was the June 28, 1914 assassination of Archduke Franz Ferdinand, heir to the Austro-Hungarian throne, by Gavrilo Princip, a Bosnian Serb citizen of Austria-Hungary and member of the Black Hand. The retaliation by Austria-Hungary against Serbia activated a series of alliances that set off a chain reaction of war declarations. Within a month, much of Europe was in a state of open warfare.

During this war, 126 men received the Medal of Honor for their actions, including five Marines who received both the Army and Navy versions of the medal for the same action.

=== Occupation of Nicaragua ===
The United States occupied Nicaragua from 1909 to 1933 and intervened in the country several times before that. The American interventions in Nicaragua were designed to prevent the construction of a trans-isthmian canal by any nation but the US and stop endless civil war. Nicaragua assumed a quasi-protectorate status under the 1916 Chamorro-Bryan Treaty. The occupation ended as Augusto César Sandino, a Nicaraguan insurgent, led guerrilla bands against US troops. Furthermore, the onset of the Great Depression made it costly for the US to maintain occupation.

Image	Name	Service	Rank	Place of action	Date of action	Unit	Notes
Head and shoulders of man in circa 1940 U.S. Marine khaki uniform, wearing many campaign ribbons.	Christian F. Schilt	Marine Corps	First Lieutenant	Quilali, Nicaragua	Jan 6, 1928 – Jan 8, 1928	Observation Squadron 7-M	For evacuating wounded Marines by plane while under fire
Full length portrait of standing man in circa 1930 U.S. Marine dress uniform.	Donald L. Truesdale	Marine Corps	Corporal	near Constancia, near Coco River, northern Nicaragua	April 24, 1932	a Guardia Nacional Patrol	Served under the name "Truesdale" before officially changing name to "Truesdell" on 25 July 1942. Lost his hand while attempting to save his patrol from an accidentally activated grenade.

=== World War II ===
World War II, or the Second World War, was a global military conflict. The conflicts joined from two separate conflicts. The first began in Asia in 1937 as the Second Sino-Japanese War; the other began in Europe in 1939 with the German and Russian invasion of Poland. (Note: Official military histories in Commonwealth nations refer to the conflict as the Second World War, while the United States' official histories refer to the conflict as World War II. English translations of the official histories of other nations tend to resolve into English as Second World War also, for example Zweiter Weltkrieg in German. See C.P. Stacey Official History of the Canadian Army in the Second World War, for example. "Official" usage of these terms is giving way to popular usage and the two terms are becoming interchangeable even in formal military history.) This global conflict split the majority of the world's nations into two opposing military alliances: the Allies and the Axis powers. It involved the mobilization of over 100 million military personnel, making it the most widespread war in history, and placed the participants in a state of "total war", erasing the distinction between civil and military resources. This resulted in the complete activation of a nation's economic, industrial, and scientific capabilities for the purposes of the war effort. Over 60 million people, the majority of them civilians, were killed, making it the deadliest conflict in human history. The worldwide financial cost of the war is estimated at a trillion 1944 U.S. dollars, making it the most costly war both in capital expenditures as well as loss of lives.

During this conflict 471 United States military personnel received the Medal of Honor, 273 of them posthumously. A total of 42 Medals of Honor, representing 9% of all awarded during World War II, were presented for action in just two battles – 15 for actions during the Japanese attack on Pearl Harbor, and 27 for actions during the Battle of Iwo Jima. Also a total of 21 (4.5% of all World War II Medals of Honor) were awarded to members of the all-Japanese American 100th Infantry Battalion and the 442nd Regimental Combat Team, for actions in numerous battles across six different campaigns. Additionally, the only Medal of Honor ever presented to a member of the United States Coast Guard (Douglas Albert Munro) was received for actions during this war.

=== Korean War ===
The Korean War was ignited by the 1950 invasion of South Korea when the North Korean Army moved south on June 25, 1950, to seize the rest of the Korean peninsula, which had been formally divided since 1948. The conflict was then expanded by the United States, China's and the Soviet Union's involvement. The main hostilities were during the period from June 25, 1950, until the Korean Armistice Agreement was signed on July 27, 1953.

In South Korea, the war is often called "6•25", or the 6•25 War (Korean: 6•25 전쟁), from the date of the start of the conflict or, more formally, Hanguk Jeonjaeng literally "Korean War". In North Korea, while commonly known as the Korean War, it is formally called the Fatherland Liberation War. In the early days of the war, United States President Harry Truman called the United Nations response a "police action". The war is sometimes called "The Forgotten War" because it is a major conflict of the 20th century that gets less attention than World War II, which preceded it, and the controversial Vietnam War, which succeeded it. In China, the conflict was known as the War to Resist America and Aid Korea, but is today commonly called the "Korean War".

During this war, 146 Medals of Honor were awarded.

=== Vietnam War ===
The Vietnam War, also known as the Second Indochina War, and in Vietnam as the American War, occurred from 1959 to April 30, 1975. The term "Vietnam Conflict" is often used to refer to events which took place between 1959 and April 30, 1975. The war was fought between the Communist-supported Democratic Republic of Vietnam (North Vietnam) and the United States supported Republic of Vietnam (South Vietnam).

During the Vietnam War and in the following twelve months, 234 Medals of Honor were received and since 1978 a further 32 awards have been presented. Of the total of 266 awards, 174 were to the US Army, 15 to the US Navy, 57 to the USMC and 14 to the USAF. The first medal of the war was presented to Roger Donlon for rescuing and administering first aid to several wounded soldiers and leading a group against an enemy force. The first African American recipient of the war was Milton L. Olive III, who sacrificed himself to save others by smothering a grenade with his body. Riley L. Pitts was killed after attacking an enemy force with rifle fire and grenades and was the first African American commissioned officer of the war to receive the medal. Thomas Bennett was a conscientious objector who received the medal for his actions as a medic; three chaplains received the medal, including Vincent R. Capodanno, who served with the Marine Corps and was known as the Grunt Padre.

=== USS Liberty incident ===
The USS Liberty attack was an attack on a neutral U.S. Navy spy ship, the USS Liberty, by Israeli jet fighter planes and motor torpedo boats on June 8, 1967, during the Six-Day War. The combined air and sea attack killed 34 and wounded more than 170 crew members, and damaged the ship severely.

Image	Name	Service	Rank	Place of action	Date of action	Unit	Notes
Top half of man in circa 1970 U.S. Navy officer uniform, before an American flag.	William L. McGonagle	Navy	Commander	Eastern Mediterranean Sea	June 8–9, 1967	USS Liberty (AGTR-5)	Continued to lead his ship despite being severely wounded

=== Post-Vietnam ===
Since the end of the Vietnam War, also known as the Vietnam Conflict and Second Indochina War, the United States was involved in a number of smaller conflicts during the end of the Cold War, including in Grenada, Panama, and elsewhere. In the Post-Cold War, the United States was involved in conflicts in the Middle East, Africa, the Caribbean, and in the Balkans. No Medals of Honor have been awarded for any of the aforementioned conflicts so far either proactively or retroactively.

=== Somalia ===
On October 3, 1993, during the Battle of Mogadishu, members of the U.S. Army Rangers and SOCOM's Delta Force executed a mission to capture members of Gen. Mohamed Farrah Aidid's forces. In the ensuing battle, two UH-60 Blackhawk helicopters were shot down. As the second Blackhawk, containing Chief Warrant Officer Michael Durant, was hit and crashed, Master Sergeant Gary I. Gordon and Sergeant First Class Randall D. Shughart were in a nearby Blackhawk monitoring radio traffic. Gordon and Shughart were part of a sniper team for Delta Force that was assigned to watch over the operation, engaging targets from their position in the Blackhawk. As they monitored the downing of the second Blackhawk, it became evident that ground forces would not be available to secure the crash site and protect the critically injured crew of four, all of whom survived the crash. Gordon, the sniper team leader, requested that they be inserted at the 2nd crash site. His request was denied twice before finally being approved on the third request. The snipers were armed only with their sniper rifles and pistols.

Upon reaching the downed Blackhawk, which was under intense enemy fire, Gordon and Shughart pulled the crew from the wreckage and proceeded to set up a defensive perimeter. The snipers, assisted by the severely injured Durant, began to engage the attacking Somalis from the opposite side of the wreckage using assault rifles stored on the Blackhawk. Shughart and Gordon were eventually mortally wounded after nearly exhausting all available ammunition; Durant, the only survivor, was taken hostage. According to Durant's account, 25 Somalis were killed and many more were wounded.

On Monday, May 23, 1994, President Bill Clinton presented the Medal of Honor to the widows of Gordon and Shughart. They are the only snipers to have received the Medal of Honor. The film Black Hawk Down, based on the book of the same name, includes a narrative of the events.

== 21st century ==
=== War in Afghanistan ===
The War in Afghanistan, which began on October 7, 2001, was launched by the United States, the United Kingdom, and NATO allies in response to the September 11 attacks. It was the beginning of the war on terror. The stated purpose of the invasion was to capture Osama bin Laden, destroy al-Qaeda and remove the Taliban regime which had provided support and safe harbor to al-Qaeda. Since 2001, 18 American service-members have received the Medal of Honor for actions in Afghanistan, four of them posthumously. Army Sergeant First Class Jared C. Monti received his medal for attempting to rescue a wounded soldier at the cost of his own life. Navy Lieutenant Michael P. Murphy received his for actions against insurgent forces and for sacrificing his life to call for help when his team had been overwhelmed by a much larger enemy force. Army Staff Sergeant Robert James Miller's surviving family was presented with his medal on October 6, 2010. On June 19, 2014, Marine Corps Corporal Kyle Carpenter received the Medal of Honor in a ceremony at the White House. He is the eighth living recipient to be awarded the Medal of Honor for actions in Afghanistan. John Allan Chapman (July 14, 1965 – March 4, 2002) was a Combat Controller in the United States Air Force who was posthumously awarded the Medal of Honor on August 22, 2018, for his actions in the Battle of Takur Ghar. The first living recipient since the Vietnam War and the fourth Afghanistan recipient, Salvatore Giunta, received his for his actions in 2007 when he risked his life to save a wounded comrade. A second living recipient, Sergeant First Class Leroy Petry, received the medal from President Obama during a July 12, 2011 ceremony. Marine Corps Corporal Dakota Meyer became the third living recipient awarded the Medal of Honor for his actions during the Battle of Ganjgal. An additional eleven living recipients have been awarded the Medal of Honor since Meyer. There have been twelve awards to the U.S. Army, three to the U.S. Navy, two to the U.S. Marine Corps and one to the U.S. Air Force.

=== Iraq War ===
The Iraq War, known in the United States as Operation Iraqi Freedom, Operation TELIC in the United Kingdom was a conflict which began on March 20, 2003, with the United States-led invasion of Iraq by a multinational coalition composed of United States and United Kingdom troops supported by smaller contingents from Australia, Poland, as well as other nations. Seven service members have received the Medal of Honor for actions in Iraq; five from the Army, one from the Marine Corps and one from the Navy. Paul Ray Smith was the first to receive it for his actions on April 4, 2003, when he held enemy forces back, allowing other wounded soldiers to be evacuated to safety. The other five recipients were Staff Sergeant David Bellavia, Staff Sergeant Travis Atkins, Corporal Jason Dunham of the Marine Corps, Specialist Ross A. McGinnis of the Army and Master-at-Arms Second Class Michael A. Monsoor of the U.S. Navy. The latter four of these each received it after being killed while using their own bodies to smother explosive devices to protect their comrades. On December 16, 2021, Sergeant First Class Alwyn Cashe was awarded the medal, posthumously, for his heroism in the Iraq conflict.

=== Operation Inherent Resolve ===
On September 11, 2020, Thomas Payne was awarded the Medal of Honor , for his actions on October 22, 2015, during a hostage rescue at an Islamic State prison compound in the north of the town of Hawija, Kirkuk Province, Iraq, in support of Combined Joint Task Force – Operation Inherent Resolve. The joint operation, conducted with the Kurdish CTG (Counter-Terrorism Group), resulted in the rescue of 70 Iraqi prisoners with one American casualty, Delta Force Master Sergeant Joshua Wheeler. Payne received the Medal of Honor from President Donald Trump during a ceremony at the White House. He is the first living Delta Force member to receive the Medal of Honor, the third Delta Force recipient after Master Sergeant Gary Gordon and Sergeant First Class Randy Shughart who died in the 1993 Battle of Mogadishu, and the first Medal of Honor recipient for Operation Inherent Resolve.

=== Operation Absolute Resolve ===
On February 24, 2026, during the 2026 State of the Union Address, President Trump awarded the Medal of Honor to Chief Warrant Officer 5 Eric Slover, a helicopter pilot whose legs were torn by machine gun fire during the 2026 United States intervention in Venezuela, capturing President Nicolás Maduro. CW5 Slover is an MH-47 Chinook pilot in the 160th Special Operations Aviation Regiment (Airborne) and currently recovering from his wounds.

== Non-combat ==
Before 1963, the Medal of Honor could be received for actions not involving direct combat with enemy or opposing foreign forces and 193 men earned the medal in this way. Most of these medals were presented to members of the United States Navy for rescuing or attempting to rescue someone from drowning. One of those awarded the Medal of Honor for rescuing others was Fireman Second Class Telesforo Trinidad, who, as of 2020, has been the only Asian American sailor to be awarded the Medal of Honor. In addition to the medals that were presented for lifesaving acts, one Medal of Honor was presented to William Halford, who sailed in a small boat for 31 days to get help for the other crew of USS Saginaw who had been stranded on an island. Three explorers were also presented with the medal by special acts of Congress. Charles Lindbergh received the medal for flying the first solo non-stop flight across the Atlantic Ocean. Floyd Bennett and Richard Evelyn Byrd received it for their participation in what was thought to be the first successful heavier-than-air flight to the North Pole and back. One recipient, Adolphus W. Greely, received his for a lifetime of military service.

== Foreign ==
Current law, 10 U.S.C. § 6241 explicitly states that recipients must be serving in the U.S. Armed Forces at the time of performing a valorous act that warrants the award. However, the Medal of Honor has been presented to five First World War unknown soldiers of allied countries: the British Unknown Warrior in the United Kingdom by General Pershing on October 17, 1921; the Romanian Unknown Soldier, the French Unknown Soldier (entombed under the Arc de Triomphe), the Belgian Unknown Soldier, and the Italian Unknown Soldier (entombed in the Monument of Vittorio Emanuele II). Each of the countries reciprocally awarded medals to the U.S. Unknown Soldier.
