= USS McKee (DD-575) =

Fletcher-class destroyer

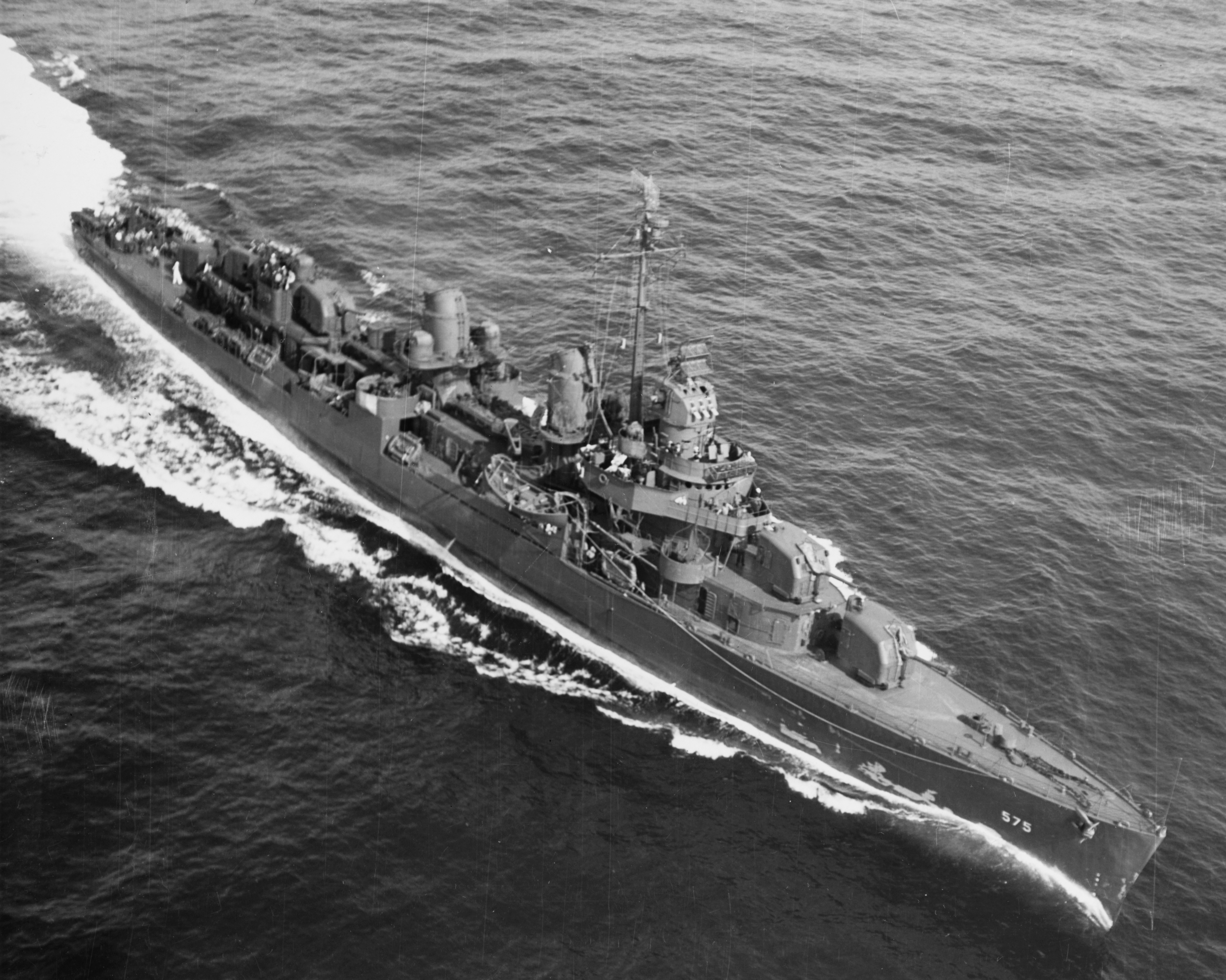
- McKee underway off the U.S. East Coast, 3 July 1943

History

United States
- Namesake: Hugh W. McKee
- Builder: Consolidated Steel Corporation, Orange, Texas
- Laid down: 2 March 1942
- Launched: 2 August 1942
- Commissioned: 31 March 1943
- Decommissioned: 25 February 1946
- Stricken: 1 October 1970
- Fate: Sold for scrap, 2 January 1974

General characteristics
- Class & type: Fletcher-class destroyer
- Displacement: 2,050 tons
- Length: 376 ft 6 in (114.7 m)
- Beam: 39 ft 8 in (12.1 m)
- Draft: 17 ft 9 in (5.4 m)
- Propulsion: 60,000 shp (45 MW); 2 propellers
- Speed: 35 knots (65 km/h; 40 mph)
- Range: 6500 nm at 15 kn (12,000 km at 28 km/h)
- Complement: 273
- Armament: 5 × 5-inch 38 caliber guns, 4 × 40 mm AA guns, 4 × 20 mm AA guns, 10 × 21 inch (533 mm) torpedo tubes, 6 × depth charge projectors, 2 × depth charge tracks

USS McKee (DD-575) was a Fletcher-class destroyer, the third ship of the United States Navy to be named for Lieutenant Hugh W. McKee.

McKee was laid down 2 March 1942 by Consolidated Steel Corp., Orange, Tex.; launched 2 August 1942, sponsored by Mrs. Richard A. Asbury, cousin of Lieutenant McKee; and commissioned 31 March 1943.

== Service history ==
=== 1943 ===
After shakedown off Guantanamo Bay, McKee departed Norfolk, Va. on 6 July 1943 for the Pacific in company with Yorktown. Transiting the Panama Canal, the ships sailed into Hawaiian waters 24 July for a 3-month training period. Ordered to join Task Force 53 (TF 53) in the South Pacific, McKee arrived New Hebrides on 4 November, but was diverted to help cover a convoy retiring from newly invaded Bougainville Island in the Solomon Islands. During heavy air attacks the night of the 8th McKee's 20 mm guns splashed two enemy planes, the second after it had released a torpedo which passed beneath the ship. Refueling at Florida Island 10 November she guarded carriers for a successful air strike against the Japanese stronghold at Rabaul, New Britain. The following afternoon the enemy lost over 50 planes in a retaliatory strike against the retiring ships. McKee accounted for one Mitsubishi G4M "Betty".

On 12 November, she at last reported to TF 53, now en route for the invasion of the Gilbert Islands. She screened the larger combatant ships off Tarawa from 19 November-7 December, then withdrew to the Ellice Islands.

=== 1944 ===
On 1 January 1944, she steamed into Pearl Harbor to prepare for the invasion of Kwajalein scheduled for 31 January. On station that date she bombarded adjoining Enubuj and provided close fire support. Screening and bombardment assignments continued until 3 February, when she began two escort missions to Guadalcanal terminating at Efate, New Hebrides. McKee sortied with TF 37 on 15 March, and participated with its battleships 5 days later in the diversionary shelling of Kavieng, New Ireland. The destroyer next covered the initial landings on Humboldt Bay, New Guinea on 23 April, and then escorted resupply convoys to the various beachheads of the Hollandia operation.

In May and June, she prepared in the Solomons and the Marshall Islands for the invasion of the Marianas. She sortied from Eniwetok on 17 July with Task Group 53.18 (TG 53.18). Scheduled fire commenced on the 21st in Agana Bay, Guam, as 3rd Marine Division went ashore. Lying close enough offshore to see pillboxes and trenches, McKee delivered close support fire through 4 August, when she retired with a group of carriers to New Hebrides.

The need for an intermediary base and airfield for the recapture of the Philippines led to the bombardment and seizure of Morotai in the Moluccas beginning on 15 September. Meeting only light opposition, McKee and her force soon sailed back to Humboldt Bay, a staging area for Leyte. By mid-October, over 700 vessels were underway to see the 6th Army safely ashore. On 20 October, as McKee approached her designated area in Leyte Gulf, two natives paddled out from Samar. Their information enabled the ship to destroy two camouflaged landing barges, a tug, and an ammunition dump. That same night she departed with a convoy of LSDs for Humboldt Bay. A series of new convoy missions brought McKee to San Francisco, California on 15 November.

=== 1945 ===
On 10 January 1945, she sailed for Ulithi where she joined the Fast Carrier Task Force (then TF 58) on 7 February for strikes against the Japanese home islands. The task force's planes struck Tokyo on 16, 17, and 25 February, hitting Iwo Jima in between, in raids so destructive and successful that the enemy failed to retaliate against the carriers or their screen.

They returned a month later for strikes, beginning on 18 March, against Kyūshū to reduce airborne resistance to the Okinawa landings set for 1 April. This raid encountered much resistance as kamikazes managed to penetrate the combat air patrol and antiaircraft fire to reach the formation. This time, McKee found pilots to rescue, numbers of live targets for her antiaircraft guns, and submarine contacts for two depth charge runs.

Air attacks increased in intensity beginning 6 April as this force of the 5th Fleet sought to protect the Okinawa invasion force against a fanatically resistive enemy. On the 14th, while McKee patrolled on picket duty, four planes made runs on her. She splashed one and badly damaged another. The third crashed 50 feet (15 m) off her starboard bow, while the fourth missed her and crashed into Hunt. Three days later she shot down an A6M Zero attempting to crash her. On 21 April, she bombarded Manimi Daito Shima. At the end of the month TG 58.1 retired to Ulithi for a 9-day replenishment and rest period.

Once underway again McKee's carriers struck Kyūshū on 13 May, then followed an alternating pattern against the enemy in his home islands and on Okinawa. Meanwhile, 28 May, McKee joined Admiral William Halsey's 3rd Fleet. Eight days later, a typhoon with winds reaching 110 knots (200 km/h) threatened to be more damaging than the Japanese. Skillful seamanship brought McKee through with only minor damage.

Repaired and overhauled at Leyte, she joined TG 38.1 on 9 July off the Japanese coast. On the 30th, along with six other destroyers, she made the closest penetration of Japanese home waters up to that time as they swept into Suruga Wan to shell an aluminum plant and railroad yards at Shimizu, Honshū. Despite the atomic bombings of Hiroshima and Nagasaki, and rumors of peace, airstrikes continued against the Tokyo area until 0900 15 August, when Japan capitulated. The day before the official ceremony on board Missouri, McKee turned homeward. She escorted Wasp to Eniwetok. then steamed to Pearl Harbor where she joined TG 11.6 bound for the east coast. McKee arrived Charleston, S.C., on 16 October, decommissioned there on 25 February 1946, and entered the Atlantic Reserve Fleet.

McKee was stricken from the Naval Vessel Register on 1 October 1970. She was sold on 2 January 1974 and broken up for scrap.

== Awards ==
McKee received 11 battle stars for World War II service.
