= Patrick Grace =

Patrick Grace may refer to:

- Patrick H. Grace (1832–1896), United States Navy sailor and Medal of Honor recipient
- Patrick Grace (politician) (1900–1975), Australian politician
