= John Andrews (Medal of Honor) =

United States Navy Medal of Honor recipient

- Medal of Honor recipient
- Born: 1846; York County, Pennsylvania
- Died: Unknown
- Military career
- Allegiance: United States of America
- Branch: United States Navy
- Rank: Ordinary Seaman
- Unit: USS Benicia
- Awards: Medal of Honor

John Andrews (1846–?) was a United States Navy Ordinary Seaman who received the Medal of Honor for his actions during the Korean Expedition. His and the other 14 Medal of Honor awards arising from the expedition, all for actions between June 9–11, 1871, were the first bestowed for a foreign conflict.

It is believed that in August 1872, he was discharged at Mare Island at his own request. His medal is held at the Naval Historical Center.

== Medal of Honor action ==
In 1871, an American fleet of five warships, manned by around 650 Marines and sailors under the command of Rear Admiral John Rodgers, sailed to an isolationist Korea to support a diplomatic delegation. Sailing up the Ganghwa Strait toward the Korean capital Hanyang (now Seoul), it came under heavy fire from forts, during which Andrews earned his Medal of Honor.

== Medal of Honor citation ==
Ordinary Seaman Andrews' official Medal of Honor citation reads:

On board the USS Benicia in action against Korean forts on 9 and 10 June 1871. Stationed at the lead in passing the forts, Andrews stood on the gunwale on the Benicia's launch, lashed to the ridgerope. He remained unflinchingly in this dangerous position and gave his soundings with coolness and accuracy under a heavy fire.

== See also ==
- List of Medal of Honor recipients
