= John Coleman (Medal of Honor) =

United States Navy Medal of Honor recipient

- Medal of Honor recipient
- Born: October 9, 1847; County Cork, Ireland
- Died: October 30, 1904 (aged 57); San Diego, California, U.S.
- Burial place: Mount Hope Cemetery, San Diego
- Military career
- Allegiance: United States
- Branch: Union Army; United States Marine Corps
- Service years: 1863–1865 (Army); 1870–1893 (Marine Corps)
- Rank: Sergeant
- Unit: USS Colorado
- Conflicts: American Civil War; Korean Expedition
- Awards: Medal of Honor

John Coleman (October 9, 1847 – October 30, 1904) was a United States Marine who received the United States military's highest decoration for bravery—the Medal of Honor—for his actions during the Korean Expedition. He was Irish-born, and received the Medal for saving the life of Boatswain's Mate Alexander McKenzie while under enemy attack on the USS Colorado.

Coleman joined the Union Army in July 1863, claiming to be 18 years old. He served with the 16th New York Cavalry Regiment and 3rd New York Provisional Cavalry Regiment until mustering out in September 1865. He enlisted in the Marine Corps from Brooklyn in January 1870, and retired in August 1893.

Coleman later died in California, and was buried at Mount Hope Cemetery in San Diego. His gravestone only mentions his Civil War service.

== Medal of Honor citation ==
Rank and organization. Private, U.S. Marine Corps. Born: October 9, 1847, Ireland. Accredited to: California. G.O. No. 169, February 8, 1872.

Citation.

On board the U.S.S. Colorado in action at Korea on 11 June 1871. Fighting hand-to-hand with the enemy, Coleman succeeded in saving the life of Alexander McKenzie.

== See also ==
- List of Medal of Honor recipients
