= William F. Lukes =

American navy sailor (1847–1923)

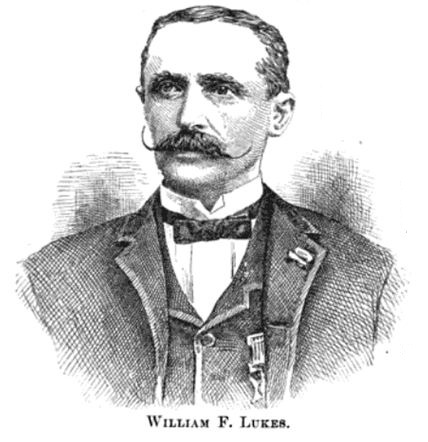
- Landsman William F. Lukes
- Born: February 19, 1847; Dolní Pertoltice, Bohemia, Austrian Empire
- Died: December 13, 1923 (aged 76); Los Angeles, California, U.S.
- Burial place: Los Angeles National Cemetery
- Military career
- Allegiance: United States
- Branch: United States Navy
- Rank: Landsman
- Unit: USS Colorado
- Conflicts: Korean Expedition
- Awards: Medal of Honor

William F. Lukes (February 19, 1847 – December 13, 1923) was a United States Navy sailor and a recipient of the Medal of Honor, the highest military decoration of the United States, for his actions during the Korean Expedition of 1871.

During the Korean Expedition of 1871, Lukes served aboard USS Colorado and participated in the Battle of Ganghwa. He was among the U.S. Navy personnel recognized for their actions during the expedition and was later awarded the Medal of Honor.

== Biography ==
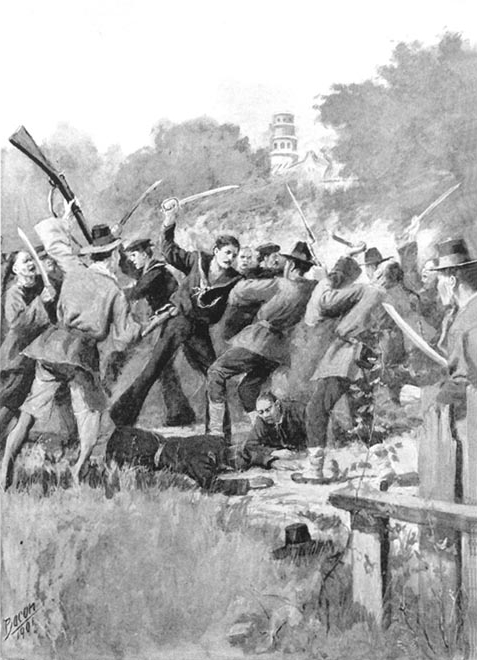
Depiction of Lukes, Allen and Murphy in hand-to-hand combat with a Korean force

William F. Lukes was born in Dolní Pertoltice, Bohemia, Austrian Empire (now the Czech Republic). He enlisted in the U.S. Navy from Tianjin, China and served as a Landsman on board USS Colorado in Company D as part of the Korean Expedition. On June 11, 1871, during the capture of the Han River forts on Ganghwa Island, the leader of the American attack, Lieutenant Hugh McKee, was mortally wounded. Landsman Lukes and two other sailors, Seth Allen and Thomas Murphy, attempted to rescue Lt. McKee but encountered heavy resistance. In the course of the ensuing hand-to-hand fight, Allen and Murphy were killed. Lukes suffered a severe cut to the head but continued to fight; he survived the engagement. When reinforcements arrived, they found Lukes unconscious, with 18 bayonet wounds, lying over the body of Lieutenant McKee. Lukes remained unconscious aboard the Colorado for 39 days. For his actions on that occasion, Lukes was specially mentioned by his commanding officer for conspicuous "coolness and bravery during the desperate fight" and awarded the Medal of Honor.

Before leaving the Navy, William Lukes obtained the rank of Seaman. Lukes suffered convulsions due to brain injury for the rest of his life. He died at the age of 76 and is buried in Los Angeles National Cemetery.

== Medal of Honor citation ==
Rank and organization: Landsman, U.S. Navy. Born: 1846, Bohemia. Enlisted at: Tientsin, China. G.O. No.: 180, October 10, 1872.

Citation:

Served with Company D during the capture of the Korean forts, 9 and 10 June 1871. Fighting the enemy inside the fort, Lukes received a severe cut over the head.

== See also ==
- List of Medal of Honor recipients
