= Pertoltice (Liberec District) =

- Municipality
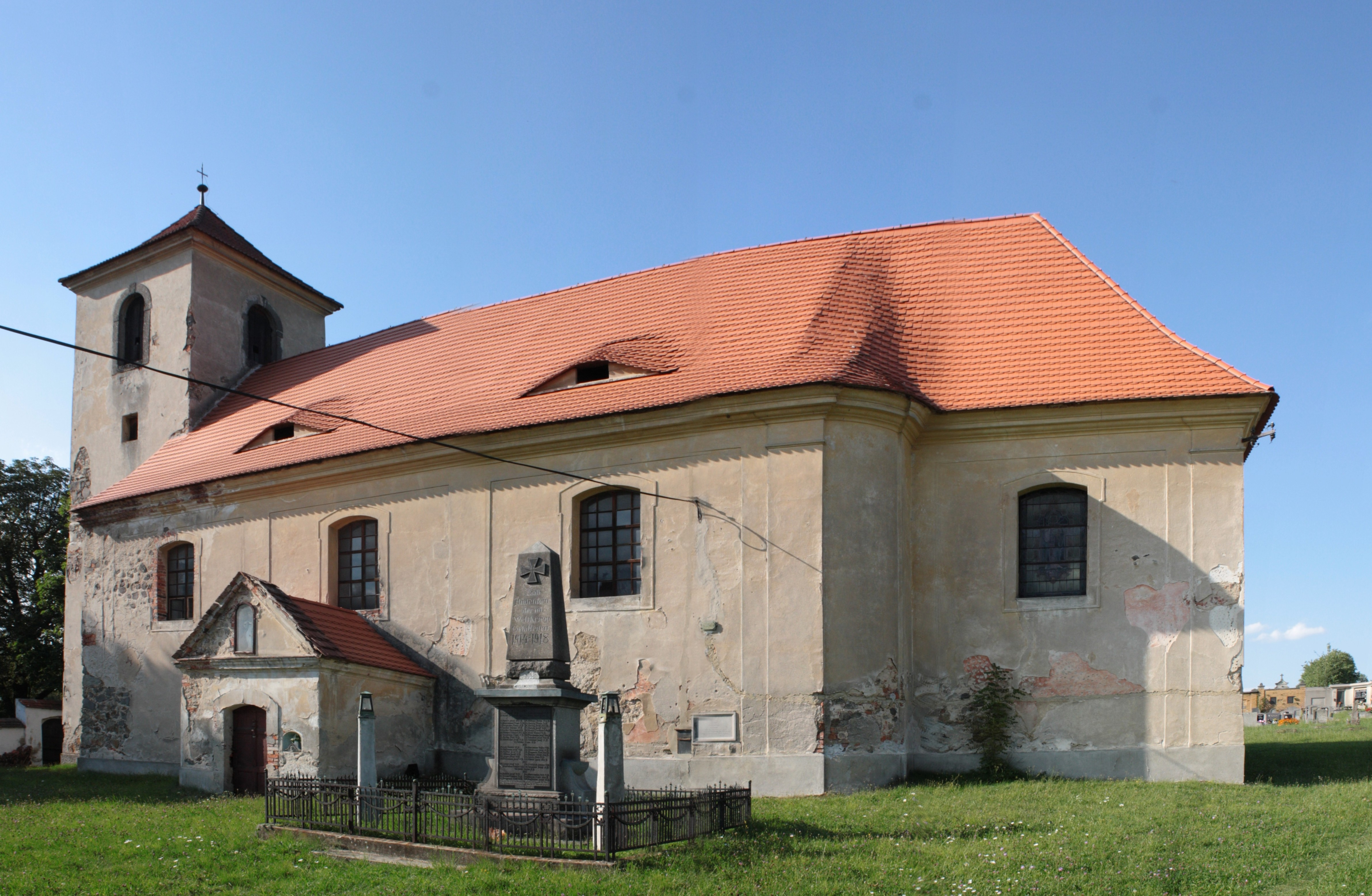
- Church of Saint Judoc

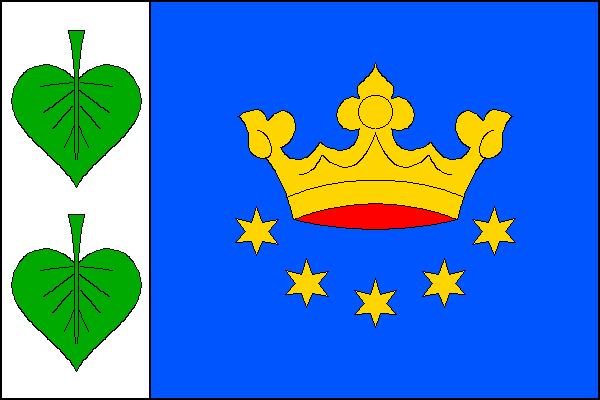
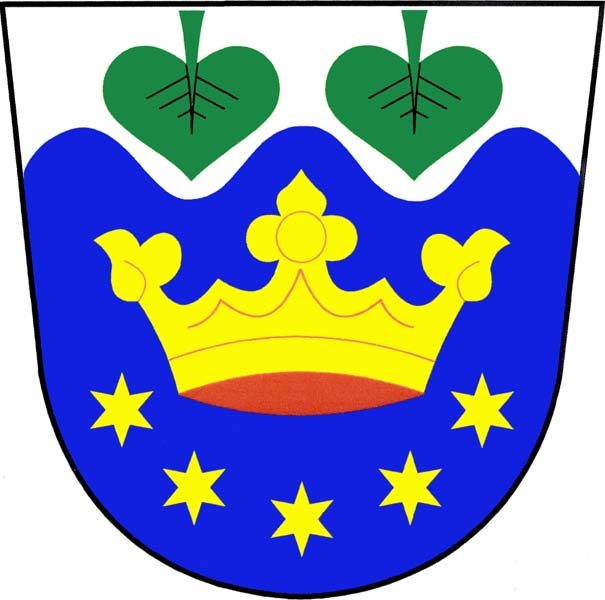
- Flag Coat of arms

- Location in the Czech Republic
- Coordinates: 50°58′43″N 15°4′30″E
- Country: Czech Republic
- Region: Liberec
- District: Liberec
- First mentioned: 1381

Area
  - Total: 10.17 km^{2} (3.93 sq mi)
- Elevation: 275 m (902 ft)

Population (2026-01-01)
  - Total: 311
  - Density: 30.6/km^{2} (79.2/sq mi)
- Time zone: UTC+1 (CET)
  - Summer (DST): UTC+2 (CEST)
- Postal code: 463 73
- Website: www.obecpertoltice.cz

Pertoltice (German: Berzdorf) is a municipality in Liberec District in the Liberec Region of the Czech Republic. It has about 300 inhabitants.

== Administrative division ==
Pertoltice consists of two municipal parts (in brackets population according to the 2021 census):

- Dolní Pertoltice (184)
- Horní Pertoltice (96)

== Demographics ==
Historical population
Year	Pop.	±%
1869	1,225	—
1880	1,108	−9.6%
1890	1,034	−6.7%
1900	987	−4.5%
1910	932	−5.6%
1921	897	−3.8%
1930	926	+3.2%
1950	438	−52.7%
1961	372	−15.1%
1970	326	−12.4%
1980	269	−17.5%
1991	229	−14.9%
2001	237	+3.5%
2011	274	+15.6%
2021	280	+2.2%
Source: Censuses

== Notable people ==
- William F. Lukes (1847–1923), United States Navy sailor
