= Bataan 1 and Bataan 2 =

Bataan 1
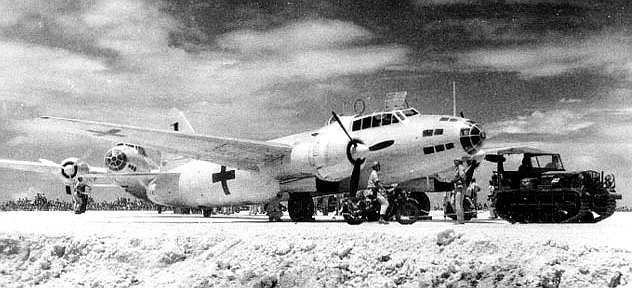
- The two Mitsubishi G4Ms (Bataan 1 and Bataan 2), at Ie Shima on 19 August 1945

General information
- Type: Mitsubishi G6M1-L2
- Manufacturer: Mitsubishi
- Owners: Imperial Japanese Navy Air Service

History
- In service: 1943-1945
- Last flight: 19 August 1945
- Fate: Scrapped

Bataan 2

General information
- Type: Mitsubishi G4M1
- Manufacturer: Mitsubishi
- Owners: Imperial Japanese Navy Air Service

History
- In service: 1943-1945
- Last flight: 19 August 1945
- Fate: Scrapped

Bataan 1 and Bataan 2 were two demilitarized Japanese bomber/transport aircraft that carried the first surrender delegations from Japan to Ie Shima as part of the surrender of Japan in World War II. The two aircraft, specifically a Mitsubishi G6M1-L2 military transport (dubbed Bataan 1) and a second, disarmed and repaired Mitsubishi G4M1 bomber (Bataan 2), carried eight members of the delegation team, which included General Torashirō Kawabe, representing Army Chief of Staff Yoshijirō Umezu who refused to participate. They departed from Kisarazu, near Chiba at 7:18 Japanese time on August 19, touching down on Ie Shima the same day.

The planes flew in an easily visible paint scheme—a pure white base marked only with green crosses on the wings (upper and lower), fuselage, and rudder. The scheme was ordered by General Douglas MacArthur, to verify that the planes were carrying the delegates. Both planes were kept under close watch by constant heavy USAAF escort, due to concerns that the delegates might attempt a kamikaze mission under the color of a flag of truce. At the same time, there were also, apparently, attempts from hardliners in the Japanese military to down the planes to prevent the surrender. Captain Yasuna Ozono, the commander of a naval air unit stationed around Tokyo, committed suicide after being unable to destroy Bataan 1 and Bataan 2 due to a lack of will amongst his men.

The call-sign was reportedly selected on General MacArthur's orders as a reminder of Japanese actions during the Bataan Death March.

Once the planes landed at Ie Shima, the delegates were loaded upon a US Army Air Forces transport plane to complete their flight to Manila. Both planes were allegedly destroyed either by accident or planned scrapping shortly after.
