= Mitsubishi G6M =

Imperial Japanese heavy fighter

G6M
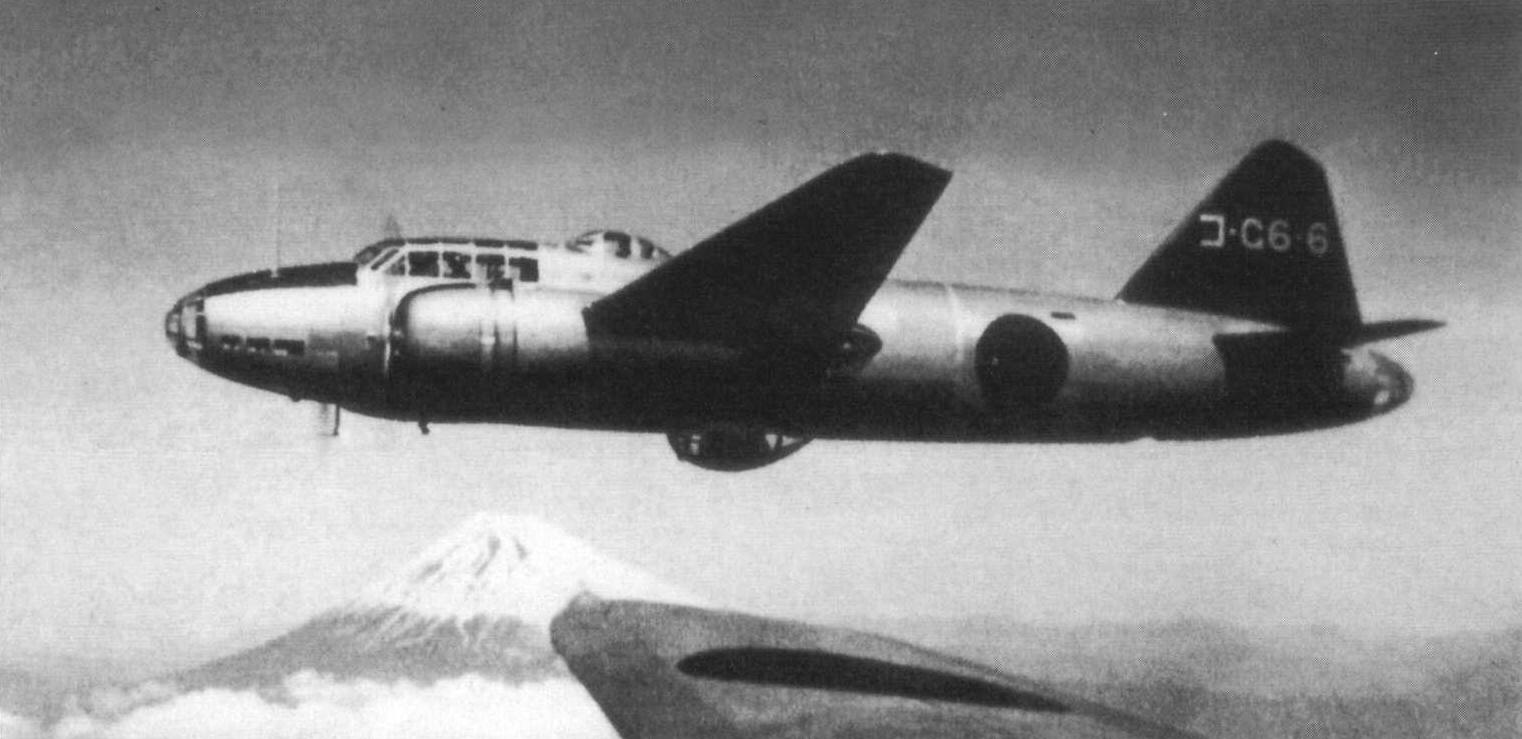

General information
- Type: Heavy fighter
- National origin: Japan
- Manufacturer: Mitsubishi
- Primary user: Imperial Japanese Navy Air Service
- Number built: 30

History
- First flight: 1940
- Developed from: Mitsubishi G4M

The Mitsubishi G6M was a Japanese heavy fighter developed during World War II for use as an escort fighter or escort gunship (similar to the American YB-40) by the Imperial Japanese Navy Air Service. It was a derivative of the Mitsubishi G4M, a medium bomber, with added forward-firing offensive cannon armament, additional armour, and an increased crew size of ten. Despite its intended role and largely due to poor performance, the G6M1 never saw combat as an escort fighter; instead, the produced units served as training and transport aircraft.

== History ==
=== Background ===
On 23 October 1939, the Mitsubishi G4M bomber took its first flight. Although the aircraft demonstrated excellent performance, it was not immediately put into serial production. This delay stemmed from the ongoing Second Sino-Japanese War (1937–1945), during which the Imperial Japanese Navy relied heavily on its existing Mitsubishi G3M bombers for combat operations in China. The navy prioritized maintaining the supply of G3M aircraft and was reluctant to disrupt production lines by introducing the new G4M, which would also require time to train crews for its operation.

Originally designed to attack enemy ships, the G3M bombers were frequently repurposed for bombing cities and enemy positions due to a lack of naval targets. Their operational range often left them without fighter escorts, exposing them to enemy aircraft. The resulting heavy losses prompted a shift from daylight raids to nighttime operations. The navy's primary fighter at the time, the Mitsubishi A5M, lacked the range to accompany bombing missions to their targets. Consequently, Chinese pilots flying relatively outdated aircraft such as the I-15bis, I-153, and I-16 inflicted significant damage on the G3M fleet. To address this vulnerability, the navy experimented with converting several G3M2 bombers into escort variants. The plan involved removing their bomb equipment and adding extra guns and cannons. The G3M2 Model 22 was selected for this role, but the concept proved flawed: after dropping their bombs, standard G3M bombers could quickly withdraw, while the escort variants, burdened by additional armament and a 10-person crew, struggled to keep pace. The introduction of the G4M, with its superior performance compared to the G3M, revived interest in the escort fighter idea.

=== Development ===
In late 1938, despite objections from Mitsubishi, the navy decided to adapt the G4M into an escort fighter even before its prototype's first flight. The initiative reflected both a desire for an effective escort aircraft and an attempt to delay the deployment of the G4M bomber variant. Development took place at the First Naval Air Technical Arsenal (第一海軍航空技術廠, Dai-Ichi Kaigun Kōkū Gijutsu-shō, commonly abbreviated as Kūgishō) in Yokosuka, a facility dedicated to weapon research and production. The new design was designated 12-Shi Rikujo Kogeki-Ki Kai (12-Shi Experimental Naval Land-Based Attack Aircraft, Modified).

The bomb bay equipment was removed, and the bay doors were welded shut. A large, teardrop-shaped gun turret was installed beneath the fuselage in place of the bomb bay, housing two 20 mm Type 99-1 Model 1 cannons – one firing forward and the other rearward. An additional Type 99-1 cannon was mounted in the tail, and another was placed on a mobile mount amidships, allowing it to fire from either side of the fuselage. The nose retained a single 7.7 mm Type 97 machine gun, consistent with the bomber variant. The dorsal gun position was eliminated, and some outer wing fuel tanks were removed, with the remaining tanks protected by a triple-layered rubber coating shielding their front and rear surfaces. Wing fuel was allocated for the journey to the target, while combat and return flight relied on additional rubber-protected tanks installed in the former bomb bay. Fuel capacity dropped from 4,900 liters in the bomber version to 3,640 liters. The crew size increased to 10.

As with the earlier G3M escort variant and later American experiments like the Boeing YB-40 Flying Fortress and Consolidated XB-41 Liberator, the concept of converting bombers into escort fighters proved impractical. Despite shedding bomb-related gear, the added weaponry and turrets increased the aircraft's weight and degraded its flight performance, leaving it unable to match the speed of unloaded bombers returning from their targets. Only the introduction of dedicated long-range fighters, such as the Mitsubishi A6M Zero, which appeared in China in August 1940, effectively protected bombing missions. The G6M1 project delayed the deployment of G4M bombers by approximately one year.

== Operational history ==
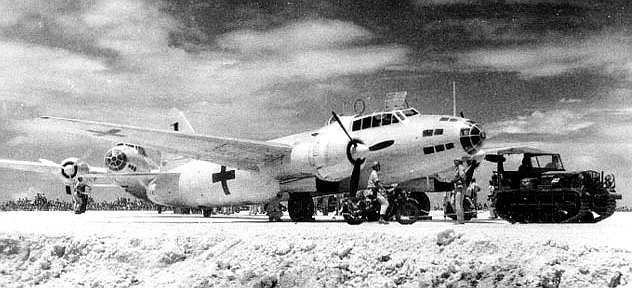
Bataan 1 and Bataan 2 on Ie Shima, with a G4M1 in the foreground

The first two G6M1 aircraft, converted from existing G4M airframes, were completed in August 1940, followed by two more in September and 12 by year's end. By March 1941, a total of 30 units had been built. The G6M1 never entered combat as an escort fighter. The initial three units, intended for fighter testing, were assigned to the Takao Kōkūtai (Takao Air Group) and repurposed for training G4M bomber crews. The arrival of the A6M rendered the G6M1 obsolete, leading to its conversion into a training aircraft for bomber crews, with excess armament removed. These modified aircraft were designated the Navy Type 1 Large Land-Based Trainer, abbreviated as G6M1-K, and entered service in April 1941.

Some G6M1 units were further modified into transport aircraft capable of carrying 20 paratroopers with equipment or an equivalent load. Large doors were added to the fuselage side to facilitate paratroop deployment, and unnecessary armament was removed, reducing the crew to five. This variant, designated G6M1-L2, was adopted in October 1941. Some G6M1-L2 aircraft served as staff transport planes within air flotillas. They were operated by the 1st, 2nd, and 3rd Kōkūtai, as well as Kōkūtai 1001 and 202 (transport units) and the Tainan Kōkūtai.

The G6M1-L2's final mission involved transporting a delegation led by General Torashirō Kawabe from Kisarazu, Japan, to Ie Shima for surrender negotiations with General Douglas MacArthur. Two aircraft, designated Bataan 1 (a G6M1-L2) and Bataan 2 (a G4M1), carried out the task. Painted entirely white with green crosses replacing the Hinomaru, the codenames "Bataan" were chosen by MacArthur, referencing the Bataan Death March. After landing on Ie Shima, the delegation transferred to an American Douglas C-54 Skymaster and flew to Manila, Philippines, where MacArthur awaited. Upon returning to Ie Shima, a malfunction in Bataan 2 forced all personnel to board Bataan 1, which then made an emergency landing near the Tenryū River on Honshu due to technical issues during the return flight to Japan.

== Variants ==
G6M1
(Mitsubishi Navy Type 1 wingtip convoy fighter) initial model of the series, armed with three 20 mm (0.787 in) Type 99 cannon (two in a belly blister, one in the tail) and one 7.7 mm (0.303 in) Type 92 machine gun in the nose; 30 built.
G6M1-K
(Mitsubishi Navy Type 1 large land trainer) trainers converted from G6M1s.
G6M1-L2
(Mitsubishi Navy Type 1 transport) G6M1s modified as transports.

== Operators ==
Japan

- Imperial Japanese Navy Air Service

== See also ==
Related development

- Mitsubishi G4M

Aircraft of comparable role, configuration, and era

- Boeing YB-40 Flying Fortress
- Consolidated XB-41 Liberator

Related lists

- List of aircraft of World War II
