= USS McKee (DD-87) =

Wickes-class destroyer

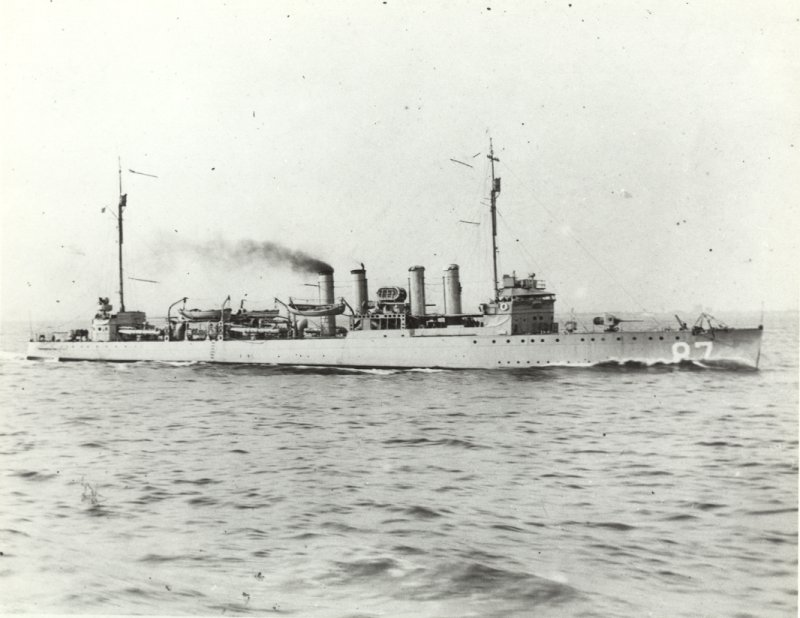
- USS McKee (DD-87)

History

United States
- Namesake: Hugh W. McKee
- Builder: Union Iron Works, San Francisco, California
- Laid down: 29 October 1917
- Launched: 23 March 1918
- Commissioned: 7 September 1918
- Decommissioned: 16 June 1922
- Stricken: 7 January 1936
- Fate: Sold for scrap, January 1936

General characteristics
- Class & type: Wickes-class destroyer
- Displacement: 1,202–1,208 long tons (1,221–1,227 t) (standard); 1,295–1,322 long tons (1,316–1,343 t) (deep load)
- Length: 314 ft 4 in (95.8 m)
- Beam: 30 ft 11 in (9.42 m)
- Draught: 9 ft 10 in (3.0 m)
- Installed power: 27,000 shp (20,000 kW); 4 water-tube boilers
- Propulsion: 2 shafts, 2 steam turbines
- Speed: 35 knots (65 km/h; 40 mph) (design)
- Range: 2,500 nautical miles (4,600 km; 2,900 mi) at 20 knots (37 km/h; 23 mph) (design)
- Complement: 6 officers, 108 enlisted men
- Armament: 4 × single 4-inch (102 mm) guns; 2 × single 1-pounder AA guns; 4 × triple 21 inch (533 mm) torpedo tubes; 2 × depth charge rails

USS McKee (DD-87) was a Wickes-class destroyer built for the United States Navy during World War I.

== Description ==
The Wickes class was an improved and faster version of the preceding Caldwell-class. Two different designs were prepared to the same specification that mainly differed in the turbines and boilers used. The ships built to the Bethlehem Steel design, built in the Fore River and Union Iron Works shipyards, mostly used Yarrow boilers that deteriorated badly during service and were mostly scrapped during the 1930s. The ships displaced 1,202–1,208 long tons (1,221–1,227 t) at standard load and 1,295–1,322 long tons (1,316–1,343 t) at deep load. They had an overall length of 314 feet 4 inches (95.8 m), a beam of 30 feet 11 inches (9.4 m) and a draught of 9 feet 10 inches (3.0 m). They had a crew of 6 officers and 108 enlisted men.

Performance differed radically between the ships of the class, often due to poor workmanship. The Wickes class was powered by two steam turbines, each driving one propeller shaft, using steam provided by four water-tube boilers. The turbines were designed to produce a total of 27,000 shaft horsepower (20,000 kW) intended to reach a speed of 35 knots (65 km/h; 40 mph). The ships carried 225 long tons (229 t) of fuel oil which was intended gave them a range of 2,500 nautical miles (4,600 km; 2,900 mi) at 20 knots (37 km/h; 23 mph).

The ships were armed with four 4-inch (102 mm) guns in single mounts and were fitted with two 1-pounder guns for anti-aircraft defense. Their primary weapon, though, was their torpedo battery of a dozen 21 inch (533 mm) torpedo tubes in four triple mounts. In many ships a shortage of 1-pounders caused them to be replaced by 3-inch (76 mm) anti-aircraft (AA) guns. They also carried a pair of depth charge rails. A "Y-gun" depth charge thrower was added to many ships.

== Construction and career ==
McKee, the second ship named for Hugh W. McKee, was laid down 29 October 1917 by Union Iron Works, San Francisco, California, launched 23 March 1918, sponsored by Mrs. J. Tynan, and commissioned 7 September 1918. Following a west coast shakedown, McKee sailed from Mare Island 13 September 1918, transited the Panama Canal the 27th, and reported for duty with Destroyer Flotilla 5 at New York 2 October. In this late phase of World War I, short coastal sailings preceded her departure from Hampton Roads 28 October as a convoy escort. Upon her arrival in the Azores 5 November she was assigned to a returning convoy and entered New York Harbor 2 December. Early in 1919 she steamed to Guantanamo Bay, Cuba, for fleet exercises from 26 January to 4 April. A number of voyages from Key West, Florida, to Halifax, Nova Scotia, kept her crew well trained prior to her reporting Portsmouth, New Hampshire, 13 December to be placed in reduced commission.

From July 1921, McKee based first at Newport, Rhode Island, then at Charleston, South Carolina, and in the aftermath of the Washington Disarmament Conference proceeded to Philadelphia in April 1922. Decommissioning 16 June 1922, she was struck from the Navy list 7 January 1936 and sold to Boston Iron & Metal Company, Inc., Baltimore, Maryland, for scrapping.
