= Michael McNamara (Medal of Honor) =

United States Marine Corps Medal of Honor recipient

- Medal of Honor recipient
- Born: 1839; County Clare, Ireland
- Died: 1907 (aged 67–68); Hoboken, New Jersey, U.S.
- Burial place: Holy Name Cemetery, Jersey City, New Jersey
- Military career
- Allegiance: United States of America
- Branch: United States Marine Corps
- Service years: 1868–1872
- Rank: Private
- Unit: USS Benicia (1868)
- Conflicts: Korean Expedition
- Awards: Medal of Honor

Michael McNamara (c. 1839/1841–1907) was a U.S. Marine who received the Medal of Honor for actions during the Korean Expedition in 1871.

McNamara enlisted in the Marine Corps from Brooklyn in November 1868, and was honorably discharged four years later.

== Medal of Honor citation ==
Rank and organization: Private, U.S. Marine Corps. Born: 1841, County Clare, Ireland. Accredited to: New York. G.O. No.: 169, February 8, 1872.

Citation:

While serving on board the U.S.S. Benicia, for gallantry in advancing to the parapet, wrenching the match-lock from the hands of an enemy and killing him, at the capture of the Korean Forts, June 11, 1871.

== See also ==
- List of Medal of Honor recipients
