= USS Benicia (1868) =

Sloops-of-war of the United States Navy

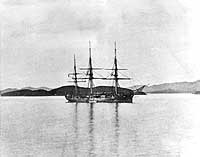
- USS Benicia

History

United States
- Name: USS Benicia
- Namesake: Benicia, California
- Launched: 18 August 1868
- Commissioned: 1 December 1869
- Decommissioned: 29 November 1875
- Fate: Sold, 3 May 1884

General characteristics
- Type: Screw sloop
- Displacement: 2,400 long tons (2,439 t)
- Length: 250 ft 6 in (76.35 m)
- Beam: 38 ft (12 m)
- Draft: 18 ft (5.5 m)
- Speed: 11.5 knots (21.3 km/h; 13.2 mph)
- Complement: 291 officers and enlisted
- Armament: 1 × 11 in (280 mm) smoothbore guns; 10 × 9 in (230 mm) smoothbore guns; 1 × 60-pounder rifle; 2 × 20-pounder breech-loading rifles

USS Benicia was a screw sloop in the United States Navy during the late 19th century. She was named for Benicia, California.

Benicia was launched 18 August 1868 by Portsmouth Navy Yard as Algoma; renamed Benicia 15 May 1869; and commissioned 1 December 1869, Commander S. Nicholson in command.

Between March 1870 and August 1872 Benicia served on the Asiatic Station and took part in Rear Admiral John Rodgers' expedition to Korea (16 May—11 June 1871). During this period Ordinary Seaman John Andrews, Chief Quartermaster Patrick H. Grace and two United States Marine Corps Privates, Michael McNamara and James Dougherty, were awarded the Medal of Honor.

Following repairs at Mare Island Navy Yard, Benicia joined the North Pacific Squadron 6 December 1872. She cruised in Mexican, Central American, and Hawaiian waters and arrived at San Francisco, California on 29 November 1874 carrying King Kalākaua of Hawaii and his suite.

Captain of the Mizzen Top Albert Weisbogel also received the Medal of Honor (his first award) for service on Benicia, in 1874.

Benicia made a cruise to Alaska (11 May—21 July 1875) and was decommissioned at Mare Island 29 November 1875. Benicia was sold 3 May 1884.

== See also ==
- List of sloops of war of the United States Navy
- List of sailing frigates of the United States Navy
- Bibliography of early American naval history
