= Samuel F. Rogers =

United States Navy Medal of Honor recipient

- Medal of Honor recipient
- Born: July 23, 1834; Rawdon, Quebec, Canada
- Died: November 1, 1905 (aged 71); Cook County, Illinois, United States
- Burial place: Forest Home Cemetery, Chicago: Section CL, Plot 1700
- Military career
- Allegiance: United States of America
- Branch: United States Navy
- Service years: 1856–1883
- Rank: Quartermaster
- Unit: USS Colorado
- Conflicts: American Civil War; Korean Expedition
- Awards: Medal of Honor

Samuel F. Rogers (July 23, 1834 – November 1, 1905) was a United States Navy Quartermaster received the Medal of Honor for actions during the Korean Expedition. He was awarded the medal for his rescue of the mortally wounded Lieutenant Hugh McKee.

Rogers was born in Rawdon, Quebec, in 1834 (his citation erroneously gives a different birthplace and date date), the son of Irish immigrants. He joined the US Navy in 1856, serving in the American Civil War and the Korean Expedition. He left the Navy in 1883, and later worked as a lighthouse keeper.

Rogers was buried at Forest Home Cemetery, in Forest Park, Illinois.

== Medal of Honor citation ==
Rank and organization: Quartermaster, U.S. Navy. Born: 1845, Buffalo, N.Y. Accredited to: New York. G.O. No.: 169, 8 February 1872.

Citation:

On board the U.S.S. Colorado during the attack and capture of the Korean forts, 11 June 1871. Fighting courageously at the side of Lt. McKee during this action, Rogers was wounded by the enemy.

== See also ==
- List of Medal of Honor recipients
