= Patrick H. Grace =

United States Navy Medal of Honor recipient

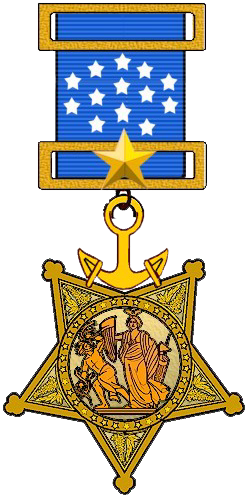
- Medal of Honor recipient
- Born: c. 1832; Ireland
- Died: February 24, 1896 (aged 63–64); Dorchester, Massachusetts, U.S.
- Burial place: Holyhood Cemetery, Brookline, Massachusetts, U.S.
- Military career
- Allegiance: United States of America
- Branch: United States Navy
- Rank: Chief Quartermaster
- Unit: USS Benicia
- Conflicts: Korean Expedition
- Awards: Medal of Honor

Patrick Henry Grace (c. 1832 – February 24, 1896) was a United States Navy sailor who received the Medal of Honor for actions during the Korean Expedition of 1871.

A native of Ireland whose name originally was Henry Patrick Grace, Grace was cited for "gallant and meritorious conduct".

== Medal of Honor citation ==
Rank and organization: Chief Quartermaster, U.S. Navy. Born: 1835. Ireland. Accredited to: Pennsylvania. G.O. No. 177, December 4, 1915.

Citation:

On board the U.S.S. Benicia during the attack on the Korean forts, 10 and 11 June 1871. Carrying out his duties with coolness, Grace set forth gallant and meritorious conduct throughout this action.

== See also ==
- List of Medal of Honor recipients
