= Mitsubishi G4M =

Twin-engine, land-based medium bomber (1940–1945)

G4M
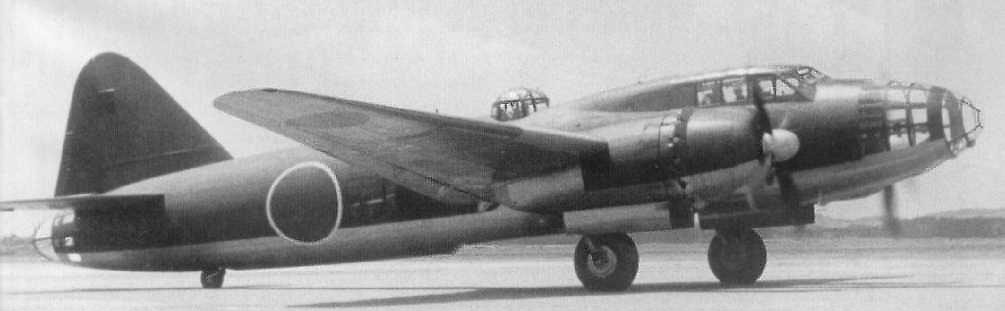
- A Mitsubishi G4M2a Model 24 of the 763rd Kōkūtai

General information
- Type: Medium bomber/Torpedo bomber
- National origin: Japan
- Manufacturer: Mitsubishi
- Designer: Kiro Honjo
- Primary user: Imperial Japanese Navy Air Service
- Number built: 2,435

History
- Manufactured: 1939–1945
- Introduction date: 2 April 1941
- First flight: 23 October 1939
- Retired: 1945
- Variant: Mitsubishi G6M

The Mitsubishi G4M was a twin-engine, land-based medium bomber manufactured by the Mitsubishi Aircraft Company, a part of Mitsubishi Heavy Industries, and operated by the Air Service (IJNAS) of the Imperial Japanese Navy from 1940 to 1945. Its official designation was Mitsubishi Navy Type 1 attack bomber (一式陸上攻撃機, 一式陸攻, Ichishiki rikujō kōgeki ki, Isshikirikukō) and was commonly referred to by Japanese Navy pilots as "Hamaki" (葉巻; "cigar", lit. "leaf roll") due to the cylindrical shape of its fuselage and its tendency to ignite after a hit. The Allied reporting name was "Betty".

Designed to succeed the Mitsubishi G3M in service, the G4M boasted good performance, excellent range and was considered the best land-based naval bomber of the time. This was achieved with flimsy structure and almost total lack of crew protection, with no armor plating or self-sealing fuel tanks. The G4M was introduced on 2 April 1941, but its problems would result in heavy losses; Allied fighter pilots nicknamed the G4M "The Flying Lighter", as it was prone to ignition after a few hits. It was not until later variants of the G4M2 and G4M3 that self-sealing fuel tanks, armor protection for the crew and better defensive armament were installed.

Nevertheless, the G4M would become the IJNAS' primary land-based bomber. It was the most widely produced and most famous bomber flown by the Japanese during World War II, and it served in nearly all battles during the Pacific War. Attacks by G4M and G3M bombers resulted in the sinking of the Royal Navy battleship HMS Prince of Wales and battlecruiser HMS Repulse, the first time capital ships actively defending themselves were sunk solely by air power while in the open sea. G4Ms and G3Ms were also credited with sinking the heavy cruiser USS Chicago during the Battle of Rennell Island. Those aircraft later served as mother ships that carried the Yokosuka MXY-7 Ohka, a purpose-built anti-ship suicide weapon during the final years of the war. A heavy fighter derivative, the Mitsubishi G6M1, was developed in 1940 for use as a long-range escort fighter by the IJNAS; the design was never utilized in the escort role, with the roughly 30 production models instead being employed as transport aircraft. Of the 2,435 G4Ms produced, no fully intact aircraft have survived, though several airframes exist as unrestored wreckage or in partial states of restoration.

== Design and development ==
The G4M's predecessor, the Mitsubishi G3M, went into service in 1937 in China. Only two months later the Japanese Navy issued specifications to Mitsubishi. The specifications, unprecedented at the time, called for a twin-engine, land-based, attack bomber with a top speed of 398 kilometres per hour (247 mph), a cruising altitude of 3,000 metres (9,800 ft), and a range of 4,722 kilometres (2,934 mi) unloaded (without bombs and torpedoes), and a range of 3,700 kilometres (2,300 mi) when carrying an 800 kilograms (1,800 lb) torpedo or the same weight in bombs.

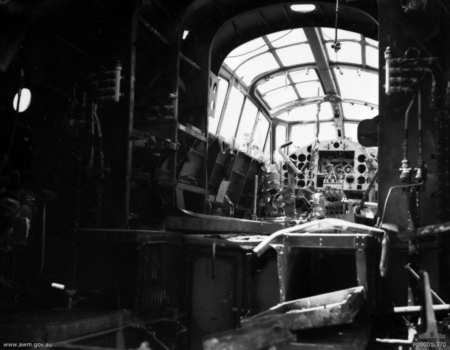
A G4Ms cockpit in 1945.

The G4M was designed for a long range and high speed at the time of its introduction. In order to meet the Navy's specifications a Mitsubishi team led by Kiro Honjo did not incorporate self-sealing fuel tanks and armor plating to save weight and extend range. This consequently made both the G4M and the Zero, in which Mitsubishi used the same design features, vulnerable to machine gun and cannon fire. Consequently, this led to Allied fighter pilots giving it derisive nicknames such as "the flying lighter" "the one-shot lighter", "the flying Zippo" and "the flying cigar" because of its tendency to ignite from damage to the wing fuel tanks after being hit by gunfire. The pilots of the Imperial Japanese Navy called the G4M the "hamaki" ("cigar"), although this was due to its shape. Due to deficiencies of the G3M in warding off concentrated fighter attacks Honjo incorporated 7.7 mm (0.30 in) guns in the nose, on top and both sides of the fuselage and in the tail a 20 mm (0.79 in) cannon was added.

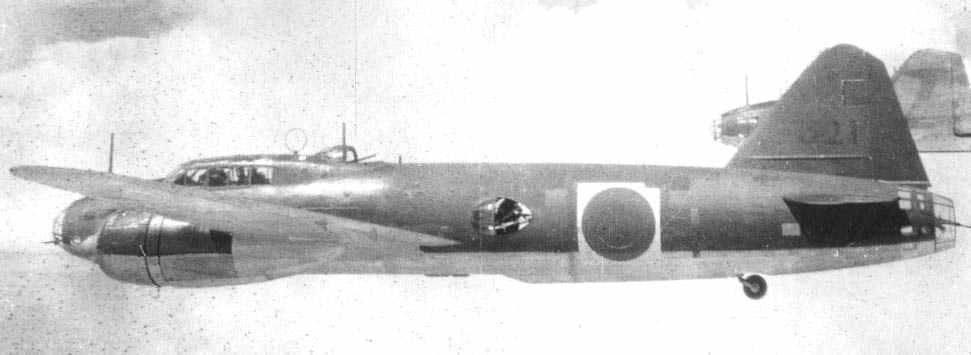
A Mitsubishi G4M1; with a non-standard roundel - a white square instead of the white circle surrounding the hinomaru.

When used for medium- to high-altitude bombing against stationary land targets like supply depots, seaports or airfields, it was much harder to intercept. Using its long range and high speed, the G4M could appear from any direction, and leave before any fighters intercepted it. The 20 mm cannon in its tail turret was much heavier armament than was commonly carried by bombers of either side, making aerial attacks from the rear quite dangerous for the Allied fighter aircraft. If G4Ms did not catch fire after being hit in the wings by flak from the ground or by machine gun bullets from enemy fighters, they could remain airborne despite severe damage. For example, after the attack of the 751 Kōkūtai (air group) on the USS Chicago during the Battle of Rennell Island, three out of four surviving aircraft (of the original eleven) returned despite flying with only one engine.

As the war continued improved bomber designs failed to materialize and Mitsubishi began creating additional versions to fulfill various new missions as well as eliminate the weakness in the design including various engine and weapon variants. The G4M2 redesign failed to rectify the G4M's vulnerability to weapons fire.

=== First flight ===
The first G4M prototype left Mitsubishi's Nagoya plant in September 1939 disassembled and loaded in five ox-drawn farm carts to Kagamigahara airfield 48 kilometres (30 mi) to the north. On 23 October 1939, test pilot Katsuzo Shima flew the G4M prototype. Despite successful tests, the Navy shelved the bomber for the more heavily armed G6M1 variant in hopes it could be used as heavy escort fighter for other bombers. Failing these expectations, the G4M1 was ordered into production.

=== Production ===
The first production G4M was completed in April 1941 and was not discontinued until the end of the war.

- G4M1 Model 11: 1172 examples (including prototypes)
- G4M2 models 22, 22 Ko and 22 Otsu: 429 examples
- G4M2a, models 24, 24 Ko, 24 Otsu, 24 Hei, and 24 Tei: 713 examples
- G4M3 models 34 Ko, 34 Otsu, and 34 Hei: 91 examples
- G6M1: 30 examples
- Total production of all versions: 2,435 examples

== Operational history ==
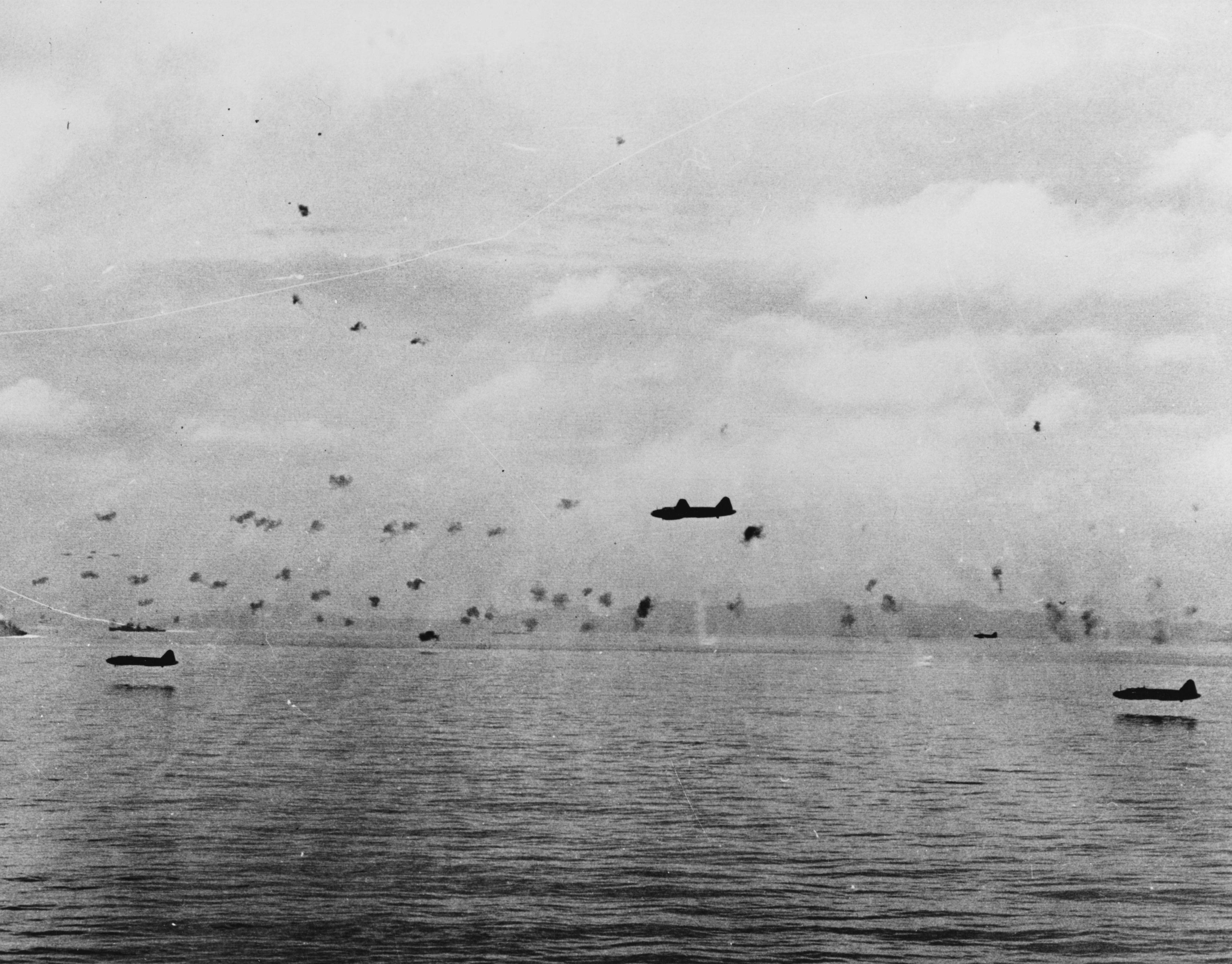
IJN aviators pressed home a torpedo attack against American ships off Guadalcanal on 8 August 1942, suffering heavy losses. The plane on the left at extreme low-level (approximately five meters) was flown by Jun Takahashi.

The G4M was similar in performance and missions to other contemporary twin-engine bombers such as the German Heinkel He 111 and the American North American B-25 Mitchell. These were all commonly used in anti-ship roles. The G4M Model 11 was prominent in attacks on Allied shipping from 1941 to early 1944, but after that it became increasingly easy prey for Allied fighters.

The G4M was first used in combat on 13 September 1940 in Mainland China, when 27 "Bettys" and Mitsubishi C5Ms of 1st Rengo Kōkūtai (a mixed force including elements of the Kanoya and Kizarazu Kōkūtai) departed from Taipei, Omura, and Jeju City to attack Hankow. The bombers and the reconnaissance aircraft were escorted by 13 A6M Zeros of 12th Kōkūtai led by the IJN lieutenant, Saburo Shindo. A similar operation occurred in May 1941. In December 1941, 107 G4Ms based on Formosa of 1st Kōkūtai and Kanoya Kōkūtai belonging to the 21st Koku Sentai (air flotilla) crossed the Luzon Strait en route to bombing the Philippines; this was the beginning of Japanese invasions in the Southwest Pacific Theater.

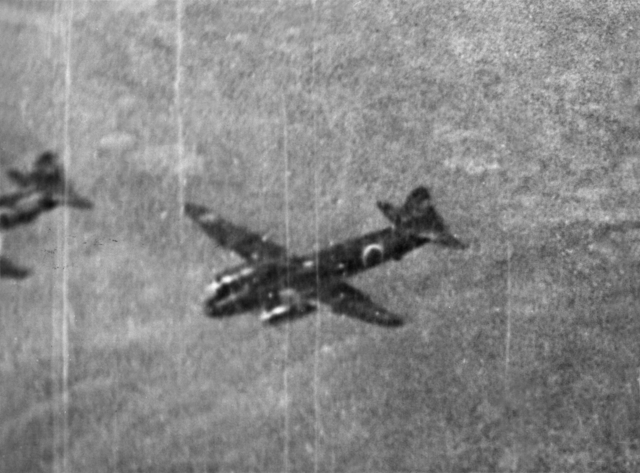
Betty bombers during an air raid over Darwin, Australia, June 1943

In its first year of combat the G4M was a success. They bombed the U.S. Army air base Clark Field, Philippines, on 8 December 1941. The G4M was instrumental in sinking HMS Prince of Wales and HMS Repulse two days later. Nine G4Ms participated in the long-range bombing raid of Katherine, Northern Territory, on 22 March 1942 (the deepest inland attack on Australian territory during the war at over 200 miles from the coast). Against weak fighter opposition the G4M attacked targets ranging as far as the Aleutians to Australia using its long range, the drawbacks of no self-sealing fuel tanks and armor not presenting themselves as problems at this point.

The G4M's most notable use as a torpedo bomber was in the sinking of Prince of Wales and Repulse of Force Z off the eastern coast of Malaya on 10 December 1941. The G4Ms attacked along with older Mitsubishi G3M "Nell" bombers, which made high-level bombing runs. Prince of Wales and Repulse were the first two capital ships to be sunk exclusively by air attacks during a war, while in open waters. The bomber crews were from the Kanoya Air Group (later 751 Ku), Genzan Air Group (later 753 Ku), and the Mihoro Air Group (later 701 Ku), trained in torpedo attacks at an altitude of less than 10 metres (30 ft), and in long-range over-ocean navigation, so they could attack naval targets moving quickly at sea. The Japanese bombers lost 4 of their number to the ships' anti-aircraft fire. There were no British fighters defending Force Z, since Flight Lieutenant Tim Vigors No. 453 Squadron RAAF, which was to provide air cover for Force Z, was not kept informed of the ships' position, and a radio request for air cover was only sent from Repulse an hour after the Japanese attack began.

In February 1942, G4Ms from the 4th Air Group, based at Rabaul, turned back a raid by the US Navy aircraft carrier Lexington, but lost 15 of 17 bombers involved in the action.

G4Ms later made many attacks against Allied ships and also land targets during the six-month-long Guadalcanal campaign (in the Solomon Islands) in late 1942. More than 100 G4M1s and their pilots and crews were lost (with no replacements or substitutes available) during the many battles over and near Guadalcanal from August to October 1942. On 8 August 1942, during the second day of the U.S. Marine landings on Guadalcanal, 23 IJNAF torpedo-carrying G4M1s attacked American ships at Lunga Point, but the American ships were well-defended by carrier-based F4F fighters and very heavy anti-aircraft fire. 18 of the G4M1s were shot down while all 18 Japanese crews – approximately 120 aviators – were lost at Lunga Point. In the two days of the Battle of Rennell Island, 29 and 30 January 1943, 10 out of 43 G4M1s were shot down during night torpedo attacks, all by U.S. Navy anti-aircraft fire. About 70 Japanese aviators, including Lieutenant Commander Higai, were killed during that battle.

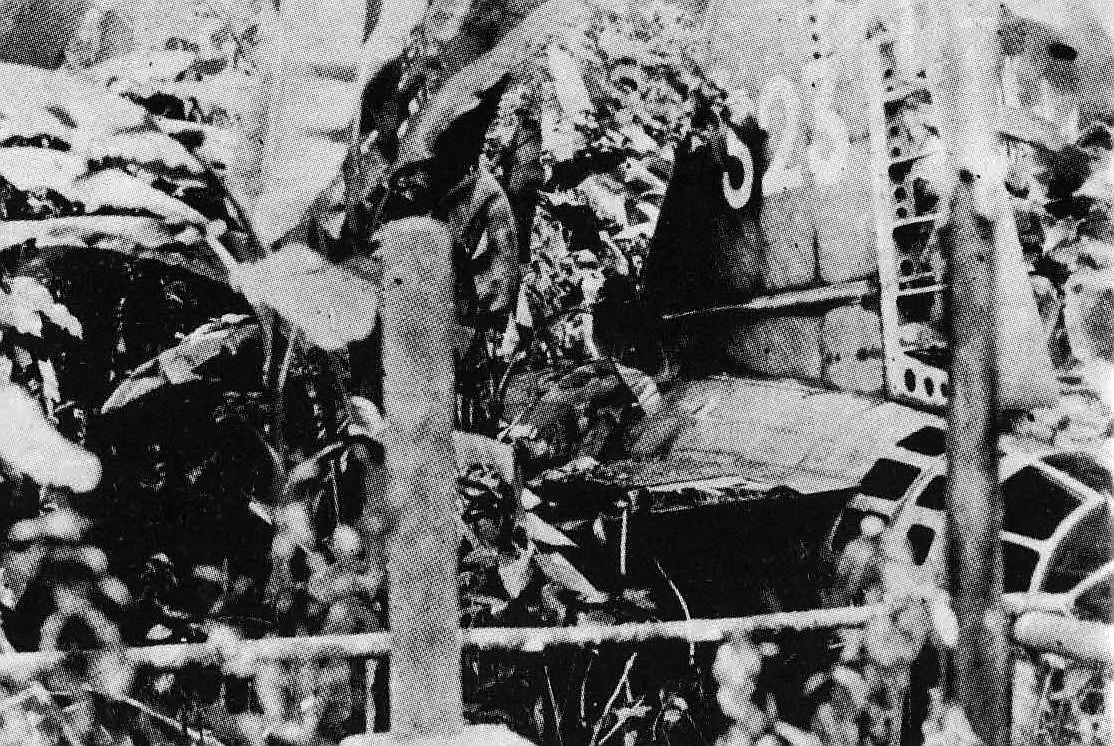
The tail section of Yamamoto's G4M1 wreck, c. 1943

Probably the best-known incident involving a G4M in the war came during the top secret mission to intercept the aircraft carrying Japanese Admiral Isoroku Yamamoto, resulting in Yamamoto's death. On 18 April 1943, sixteen P-38 Lightnings of the 339th Fighter Squadron of the 347th Fighter Group, Thirteenth Air Force, shot down a G4M1 of the 705th Kōkūtai with the tailcode T1-323, carrying Admiral Yamamoto. In the same battle, another G4M1 carrying Chief of Staff Vice Admiral Matome Ugaki was also downed by the P-38s, although Ugaki survived.

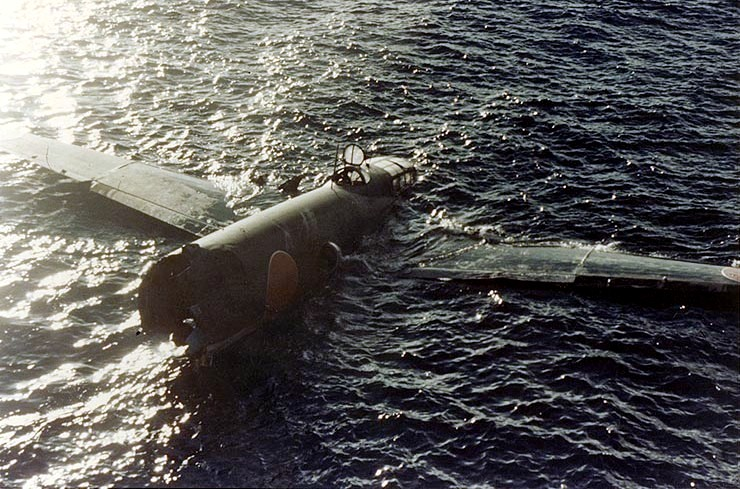
A largely-intact G4M - minus its tail section - which crashed into the sea off the coast of Tulagi on 8 August 1942, photographed from USS Ellet

The G4M Model 11 was replaced by the Models 22, 22a/b, 24a/b, 25, 26, and 27 from June 1943 onward, giving service in New Guinea, the Solomons, and the South Pacific area, in defense of the Marianas and finally in Okinawa. Other G4Ms received field modifications, resulting in the Model 24j. This model carried the Yokosuka MXY7 Ohka Model 11 suicide flying bomb, beginning on 21 March 1945, with disastrous results due to heavy Allied fighter opposition.

After the loss of Okinawa, G4Ms constituted the main weapon of the land-based Japanese naval bomber force. It consisted of twenty Kōkūtai at the end of the war. This included the testing air group, which was equipped in 1944–45 with the latest version G4M3 Models 34 and 36 - though these arrived too late to affect the course of the war.

From November 1944 to January 1945, G4Ms were one of the main types of aircraft used in the Japanese air attacks on the Mariana Islands and plans to use converted G4Ms to land commandos on the islands were developed in mid-1945 and cancelled only at the end of the war.

As part of the negotiations for the surrender of Japan, two demilitarized G4Ms, given the call-signs Bataan 1 and Bataan 2, flew to Ie Shima, carrying the first surrender delegations on the first leg of their flight to Manila. The G4Ms were painted white with green crosses and were escorted by American P-38 fighters.

The G4M's intended successor was the Yokosuka P1Y Ginga. However, because of production problems, the changeover was only begun by the time the war ended.

== Variants ==
=== G4M1 ===
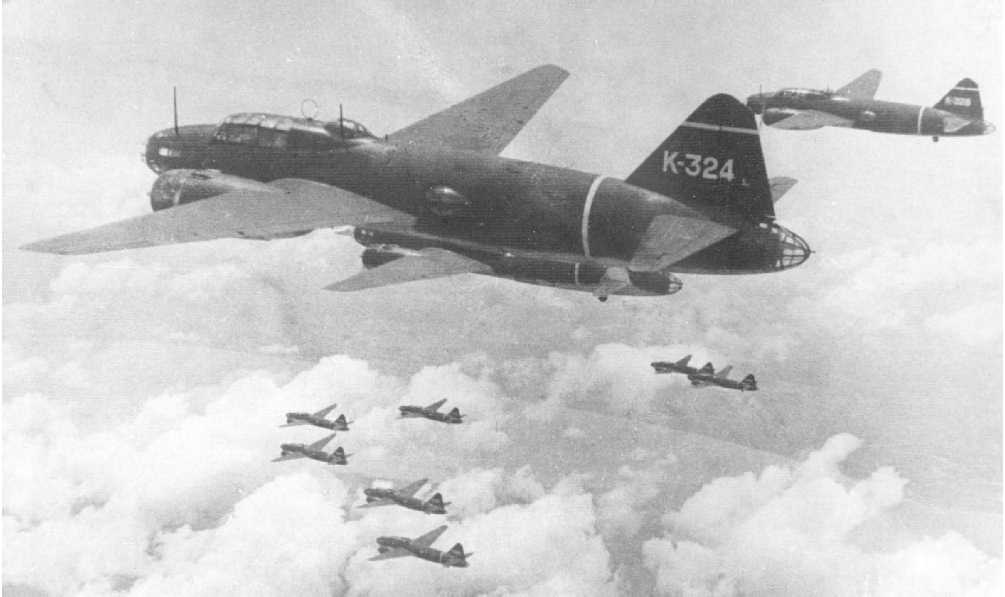
Early production G4M1s of Kanoya Kōkūtai with the original shape tail cones.

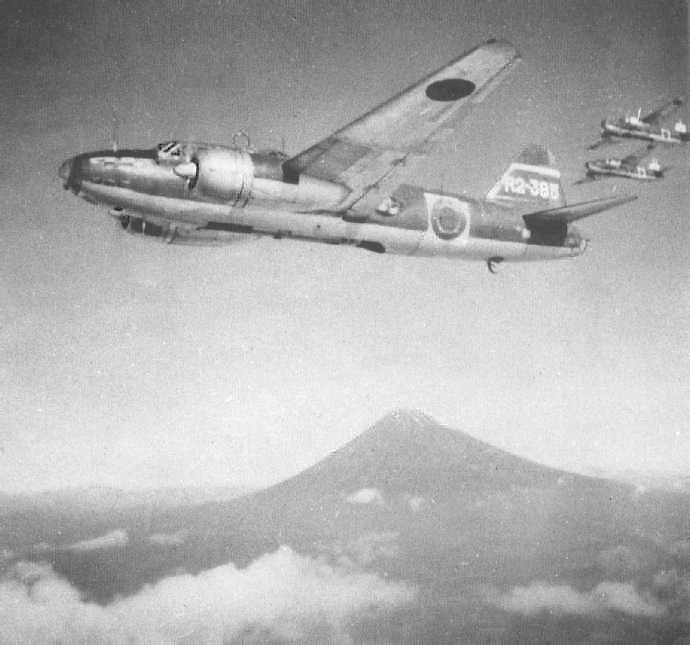
Mid- or late-production G4M1 Model 11s with the propeller spinners and rubber ply beneath the wing fuel tanks.

G4M1 prototypes
(Mitsubishi Navy Type 1 attack bomber) / (Mitsubishi Navy Experimental 12-Shi land attacker). Two prototypes built.
G4M1 Model 11
(Mitsubishi Navy Type 1 Attack Bomber Model 11). The first bomber model of series, with 1,140 kW (1,530 hp) Mitsubishi MK4A "Kasei" Model 11 engines driving three-blade propellers. The following modifications were made during production:

- March 1942: the first aircraft (241st production example) fitted with Mitsubishi MK4E "Kasei" Model 15 engines with larger superchargers for better high altitude performance, became standard in August 1942 from 406th aircraft onwards. These MK4E-engined aircraft have often (erroneously) been referred as the "G4M1 Model 12".
- Summer 1942: propeller spinners introduced
- March 1943: from 663rd machine onwards, 30 mm (1.181 in) rubber ply sheets installed beneath the wing outer surfaces to protect the underside of the fuel tanks (speed reduced by 9 km/h (4.9 kn; 5.6 mph) and range by 315 km (170 nmi; 196 mi), 5 mm (0.197 in) armour plates added into tail gunner's compartment.
- Spring 1943: outer half of the tail cone cut away in order to improve tail gunner's field of fire.
- August 1943: a completely redesigned tail cone, with reduced framing and wide V-shaped cut out; this form of tail cone was also used in all G4M2 models.
- September 1943: individual exhaust stacks from 954th airframe onwards

Production of the G4M1 ended in January 1944.

=== G4M2 ===
The first of the four G4M2 prototypes flew in December 1942 (Mitsubishi Navy Type 1 Attack Bomber Model 22). It differed from the preceding model in having Mitsubishi MK4P "Kasei" Model 21 engines with VDM electric four-blade propellers capable of full feathering function, redesigned main wings with LB type laminar flow airfoil. (Note: LB type laminar airfoil was designed by Professor Tani of Tokyo University in 1937.) and widened tail horizontal stabilizer wing area, which improved service ceiling to 8,950 m (29,360 ft) and maximum speed to 437 km/h (236 kn; 272 mph). Main wing fuel tanks were enlarged to 6,490 L (1,710 US gal; 1,430 imp gal) which increased the range to 6,000 km (3,200 nmi; 3,700 mi) (overloaded, one way). An electrically powered dorsal turret featuring a 20 mm (0.787 in) Type 99 cannon was introduced in place of G4M1's dorsal position with a 7.7 mm (0.303 in) Type 92 machine gun, total guns armed were two 20 mm (0.787 in) Type 99 cannons (one tail turret, one top turret), and four 7.7 mm (0.303 in) Type 92 machine guns (one nose, two waist, and one cockpit side). External differences also included increased nose glazing, flush side gun positions instead of blisters, and rounded tips of wings and tail surfaces. These major improvements also made it possible for the G4M2 to carry more powerful bombs; one 1,055 kg (2,326 lb) Navy Type 91 Kai-7 aerial torpedo or one 800 kg (1,800 lb) bomb or two 500 kg (1,100 lb) bombs or one 800 kg (1,800 lb) Type 3 No. 31 bomb (ray-detective type bomb) and twelve 60 kg (130 lb) bombs. The G4M2 entered service in mid-1943.

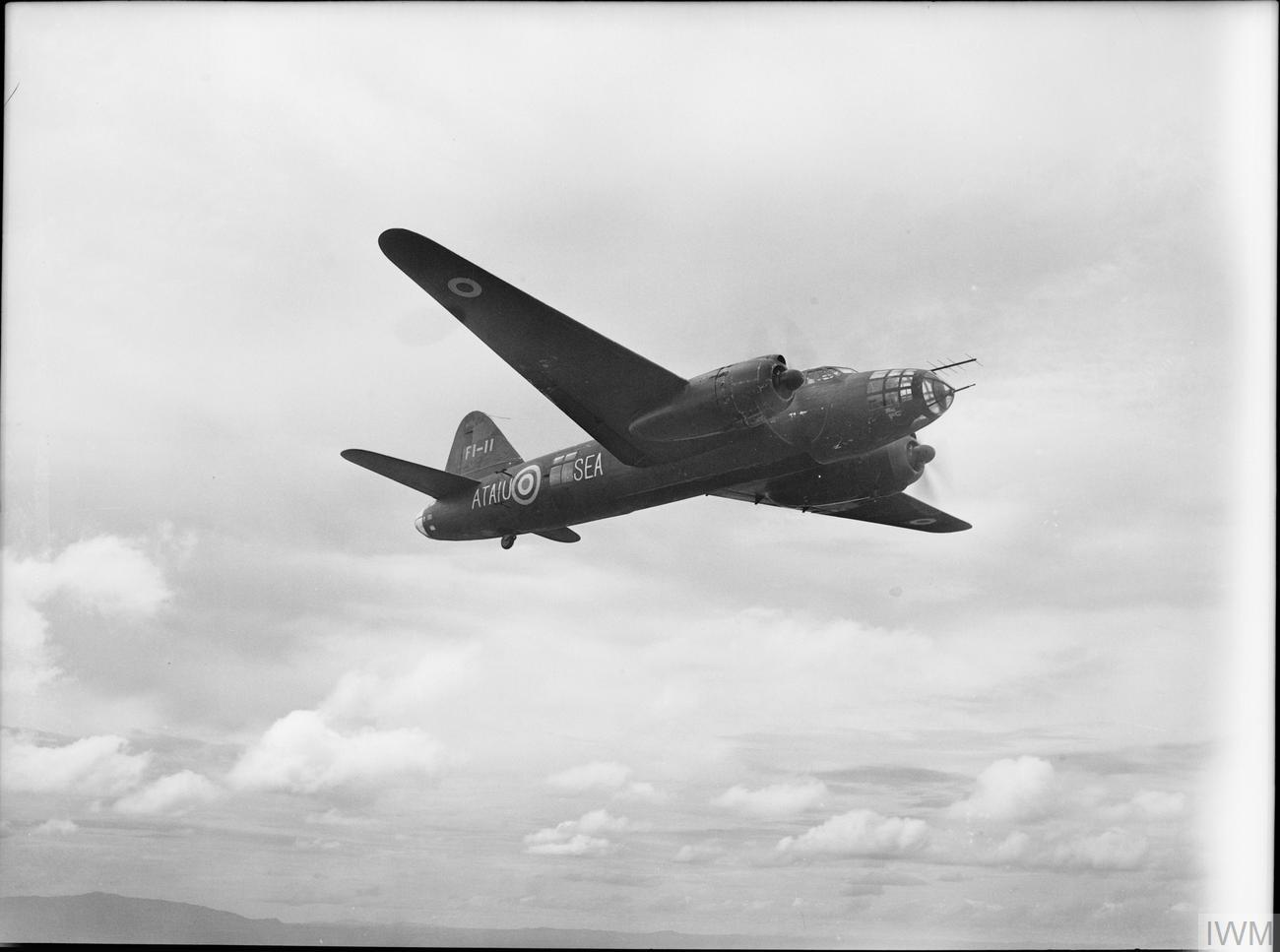
A G4M2a Model 24 Hei captured by RAF flying over Malaya

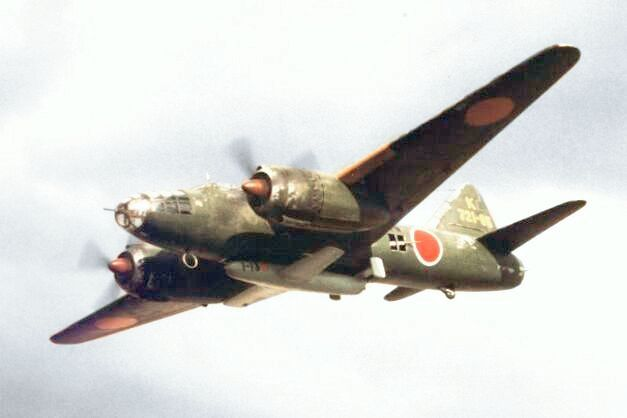
721st Kōkūtai G4M2e bomber carrying an Ohka (image of a plastic model)

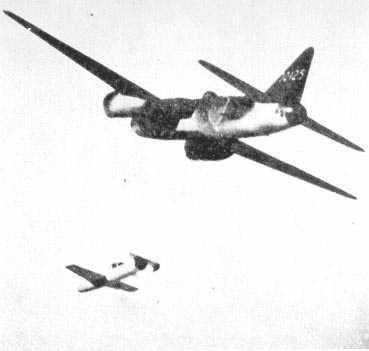
G4M2e Model 24 Tei launching a suicide Yokosuka MXY-7 Ohka "Baka" (wind tunnel model experiment)

G4M2 Model 22
(Mitsubishi Navy Type 1 Attack Bomber Model 22) the base model, the first production example completed in July 1943. Introduced bulged bomb bay doors from 65th aircraft onwards, and an optically flat panel in the nose cone from the 105th aircraft onwards.
G4M2 Model 22Ko
(Mitsubishi Navy Type 1 Attack Bomber Model 22 Ko) very similar to previous model. Carried Type 3 Ku Mark 6 search radar and was armed with 20 mm (0.787 in) Type 99 Model 1 cannon s replacing the 7.7 mm (0.303 in) Type 92 machine guns in the lateral positions.
G4M2 Model 22 Otsu
(Mitsubishi Navy Type 1 Attack Bomber Model 22 Otsu) dorsal turret cannon changed to longer-barreled 20 mm (0.787 in) Type 99 Model 2 cannon.
G4M2a Model 24
(Mitsubishi Navy Type 1 Attack Bomber Model 24) modified Model 22, Mitsubishi MK4T Kasei 25 1,340 kW (1,800 hp) engines, with bulged bomb bay doors as standard for larger bomb capacity. Externally distinguishable from the Model 22 by a carburetor air intake on the top of the engine cowling.
G4M2a Model 24 Ko
(Mitsubishi Navy Type 1 Attack Bomber Model 24 Ko) armament similar to Model 22 Ko.
G4M2a Model 24 Otsu
(Mitsubishi Navy Type 1 Attack Bomber Model 24 Otsu) armament similar to Model 22 Otsu.
G4M2a Model 24 Hei
(Mitsubishi Navy Type 1 Attack Bomber Model 24 Hei) modified 24 Otsu, with one 13.2 mm (0.520 in) Type 2 machine gun mounted in tip of the nose cone, radar antenna relocated from that position to above the nose cone.
G4M2b Model 25
(Mitsubishi Navy Type 1 Attack Bomber Model 25) one G4M2a modified to Mitsubishi MK4T-B Kasei 25 Otsu 1,360 kW (1,820 hp) engines. Only experimental.
G4M2c Model 26
(Mitsubishi Navy Type 1 Attack Bomber Model 26) two G4M2as modified to Mitsubishi MK4T-B Ru Kasei 25b 1,360 kW (1,820 hp) engines with turbochargers.
G4M2d Model 27
(Mitsubishi Navy Type 1 Attack Bomber Model 27) one G4M2 modified to Mitsubishi MK4V Kasei 27 1,340 kW (1,800 hp) engines.
G4M2e Model 24 Tei
(Mitsubishi Navy Type 1 Attack Bomber Model 24 Tei) special version for the transport of the ramming attack bomb plane Kugisho/Yokosuka MXY-7 Ohka ("Baka") Model 11, conversions of G4M2a Model 24 Otsu and 24 Hei. Had armour protection for the pilots and fuselage fuel tanks.
MXY11 (Yokosuka Navy Type 1 attack bomber ground decoy)
ground decoy non-flying replica of Mitsubishi G4M2 developed by Yokosuka

=== G4M3 ===
G4M3 Model 34
(Mitsubishi Navy Type 1 Attack Bomber Model 34 Tei) redesigned G4M2 with added self-sealing fuel tanks, improved armor protection and an entirely new tail gunner's compartment similar to that of late model B-26 Marauders. Wings were also redesigned and the horizontal tailplane was given dihedral. Armed with two 7.7 mm (0.303 in) Type 92 machine guns in nose cabin and in both side positions, and one 20 mm (0.787 in) Type 99 Model 1 cannon in dorsal turret and tail. Entered production in October 1944 in G4M3a Model 34 Ko form with 20 mm (0.787 in) Type 99 cannon in side positions instead of machine guns.
G4M3a Model 34 Hei
(Mitsubishi Navy Type 1 Attack Bomber Model 34 Hei) similar modifications as in corresponding Model 24 variants.
G4M3a Model 34 Otsu
(Mitsubishi Navy Type 1 Attack Bomber Model 34 Otsu) similar modifications as in corresponding Model 24 variants.
G4M3 Model 36
(Mitsubishi Navy Type 1 Attack Bomber Model 36) prototype. Two G4M2 Model 34 modified to Mitsubishi MK4-T Kasei 25b Ru 1,360 kW (1,820 hp) engines.

== Operators ==
Japan

- Imperial Japanese Navy Air Service operated the type during 1941–45 in a total of 37 Kōkūtai (air groups).

=== Postwar ===
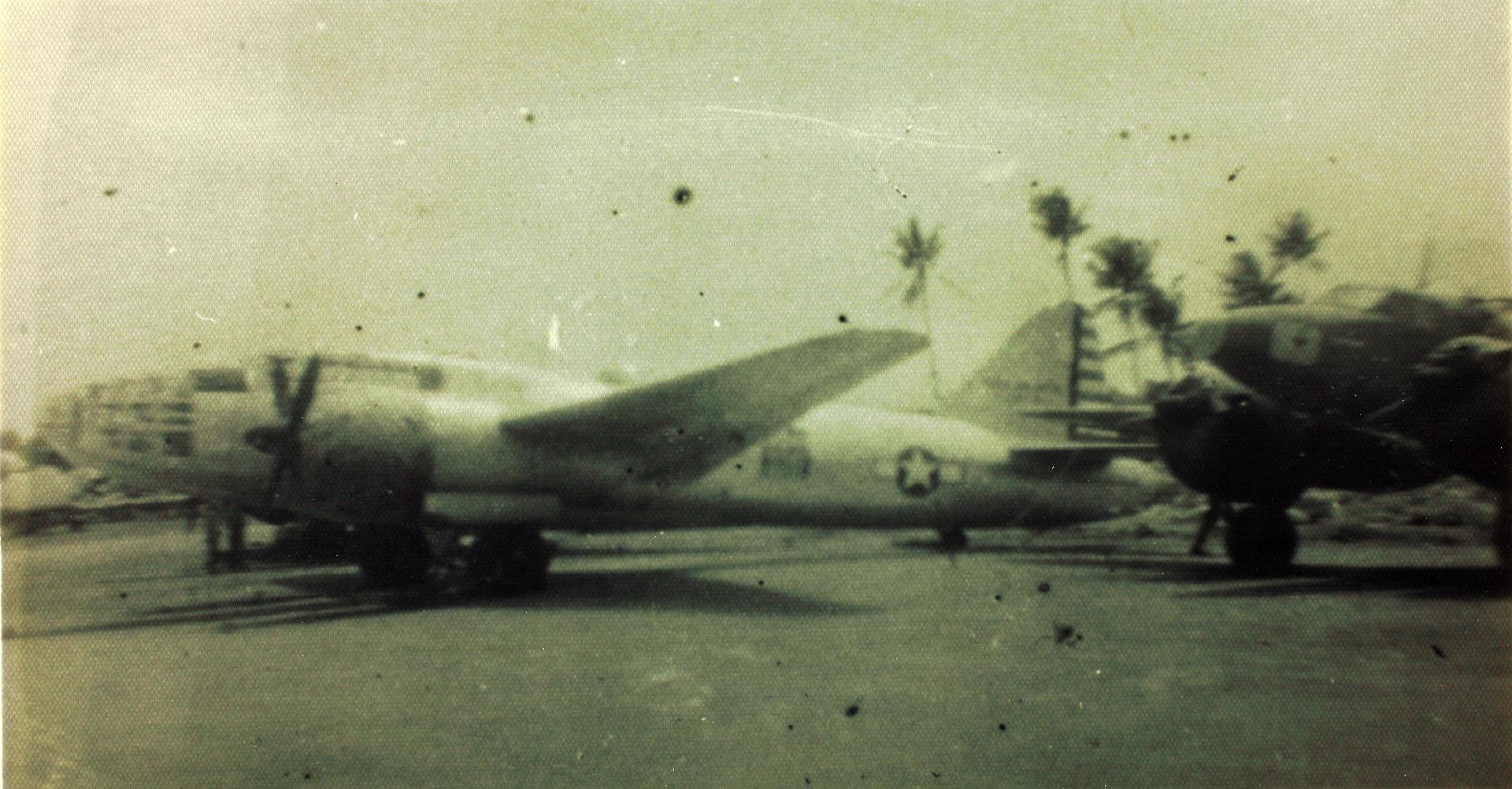
A captured G4M2 in U.S. Army Air Force markings

Indonesia

- Indonesian Air Force

China

- People's Liberation Army Air Force

Republic of China

- Republic of China Air Force at least one G4M2 captured at Tainan Naval Airbase

United Kingdom

- Royal Air Force operated at least one captured aircraft for evaluation purposes.

United States

- United States Army Air Force operated captured aircraft for evaluation.

== Surviving aircraft ==
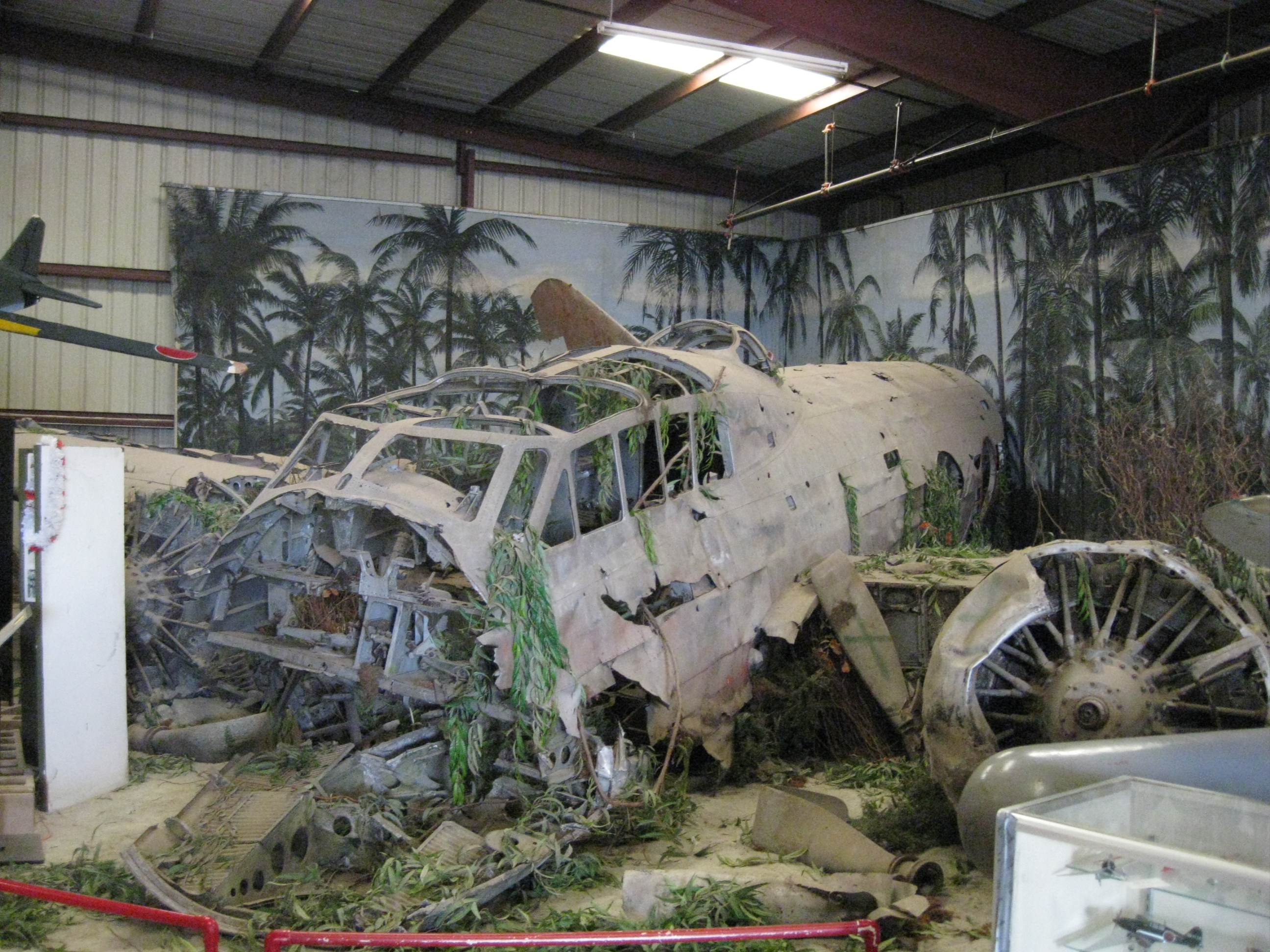
The G4M1 on display at the Planes of Fame Air Museum in 2010

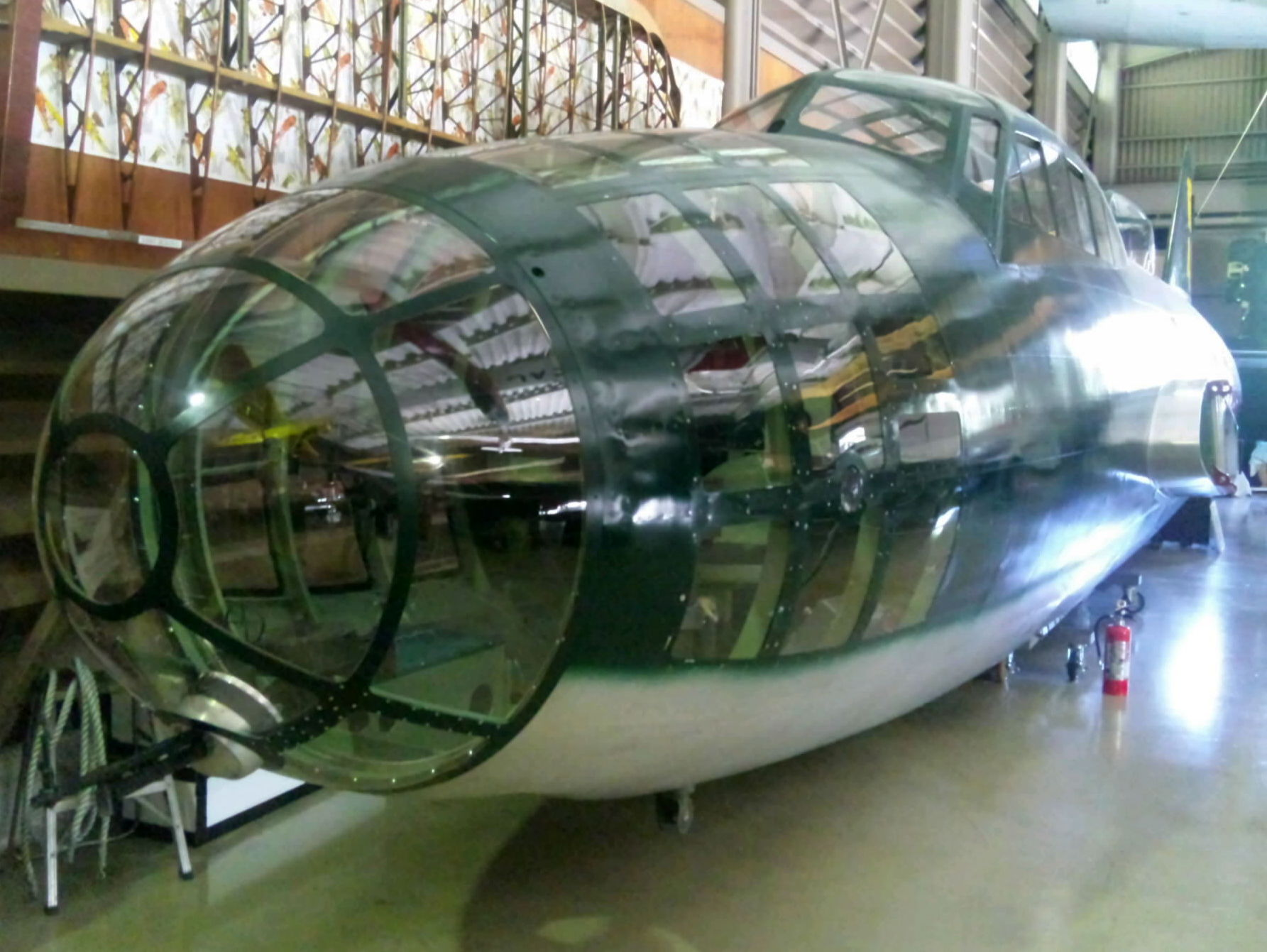
G4M2 12107's fuselage, restored and on display at the Kawaguchiko Motor Museum. While the middle and rear sections of the fuselage were retained from the original aircraft, the forward section was completely rebuilt according to the original specifications.

No complete or flyable Mitsubishi G4Ms are left, although several wrecks remain scattered in southeast Asia and on Pacific islands, having been left in-situ following the end of the war. In addition, several G4Ms survive in the form of preserved fuselage sections.

- G4M1 Model 11 (Serial #1280): On display in a diorama at the Planes of Fame Air Museum in Chino, California in an unrestored condition. The only complete G4M Betty bomber. Built in Nagoya Works No. 3 on 16 April 1942, tail number 370, which had probably crash landed before mid-1944, and was recovered from Babo Airfield, Indonesia, in 1991.
- G4M1 Model 11 (Serial #1800): Assigned to the 701st Naval Air Group. Abandoned on Ballale Airfield. During August 2018, it was recovered from Ballale Island in the Solomon Islands, along with another G4M1 (Serial #2806) and the fuselage of an early model G4M1 by a "foreign salvager".
- G4M1 Model 11 (Serial #2806): Tail code U-321, was assigned to the Misawa Naval Air Group in the Solomon Islands from Ballale Airfield. Was abandoned on a revetment, next to a bomb crater, both engines missing. During August 2018 it was recovered by a "foreign salvager" along with another G4M1 Betty Model 11 (Serial #1800) and a fuselage of an early model G4M1. Since late January 2021 was on display at Markwarth Collection / Solomon Islands War Museum (SIWM) with a tail section attached, possibly with that of the early model G4M1.

Several other locations display G4Ms in partial states of completion; the restored fuselage of a G4M2 is on display at the Kawaguchiko Motor Museum in Yamanashi Prefecture, Japan.

Additionally the Smithsonian Institution retains the forward fuselage of a G4M3 Betty Model 34. Likely based in Oppama Air Field near Yokosuka, Japan there is no recorded tail number. The aircraft was part of 145 other Japanese aircraft for tests and evaluations by the U.S. Navy. After being flight tested as "Foreign Equipment Test number T2-2205" the airplane was dismembered by a cutting torch for unknown reasons.

The wreck of Admiral Yamamoto's G4M1 Model 11 (Serial #2656) tail code 323 were still present at the crash site in the jungle near Panguna, Bougainville Island, with some parts and artifacts recovered and displayed at the museums in Papua New Guinea, Australia, and Japan. The wreck consisted of rear fuselage section and vertical stabilizer along with parts of the wings and engines. The crash site is accessible via prior arrangement to the landowners.

== Specifications (G4M1, Model 11) ==
Mitsubishi G4M3 Betty

Data from Airreview's Japanese Navy Aircraft in the Pacific War, and Japanese Aircraft of the Pacific War

General characteristics

- Crew: 7 (pilot, co-pilot, navigator/bombardier/nose gunner, captain/top turret gunner, radio operator/waist gunner, engine mechanic/waist gunner, tail gunner)
- Length: 19.97 m (65 ft 6 in)
- Wingspan: 24.89 m (81 ft 8 in)
- Height: 4.9 m (16 ft 1 in) in rigging position
- Wing area: 78.125 m^{2} (840.93 sq ft)
- Airfoil: root: MAC118 mod (12.5%); tip:MAC118 mod (10%)
- Empty weight: 6,741 kg (14,861 lb)
- Gross weight: 9,500 kg (20,944 lb)
- Max takeoff weight: 12,860 kg (28,351 lb)
- Powerplant: 2 × Mitsubishi MK4A Kasei 11 14-cylinder air-cooled radial piston engines, 1,140 kW (1,530 hp) each for take-off

1,050 kW (1,410 hp) at 2,000 m (6,600 ft)
1,000 kW (1,340 hp) at 4,000 m (13,000 ft)

- Propellers: 3-bladed Hamilton Standard licensed Sumitomo constant speed variable-pitch

Performance

- Maximum speed: 428 km/h (266 mph, 231 kn) at 4,200 m (13,800 ft)
- Cruise speed: 315 km/h (196 mph, 170 kn) at 3,000 m (9,800 ft)
- Stall speed: 120 km/h (75 mph, 65 kn)
- Range: 2,852 km (1,772 mi, 1,540 nmi)
- Ferry range: 5,040 km (3,130 mi, 2,720 nmi) (Note: Serial no. 603 and later had 30 mm (1.2 in) thick natural rubber plates covering the outside bottoms of the wing fuel tanks but this decreased their service range by 10%.)
- Rate of climb: 9.17 m/s (1,805 ft/min)

Armament

- Guns: 1× 20 mm Type 99 cannon (tail turret), 4× 7.7 mm Type 92 machine gun (nose turret ×1, waist positions ×2, top turret ×1)
- Bombs: 1× 858 kg (1,892 lb) Type 91 Kai-3 (improved model 3) aerial torpedo or 1× 800 kg (1,764 lb) bomb or 4× 250 kg (551 lb) bombs or 1x 1200 kg (2,645 lb) Yokosuka MXY-7 Ohka suicide bomb

== See also ==
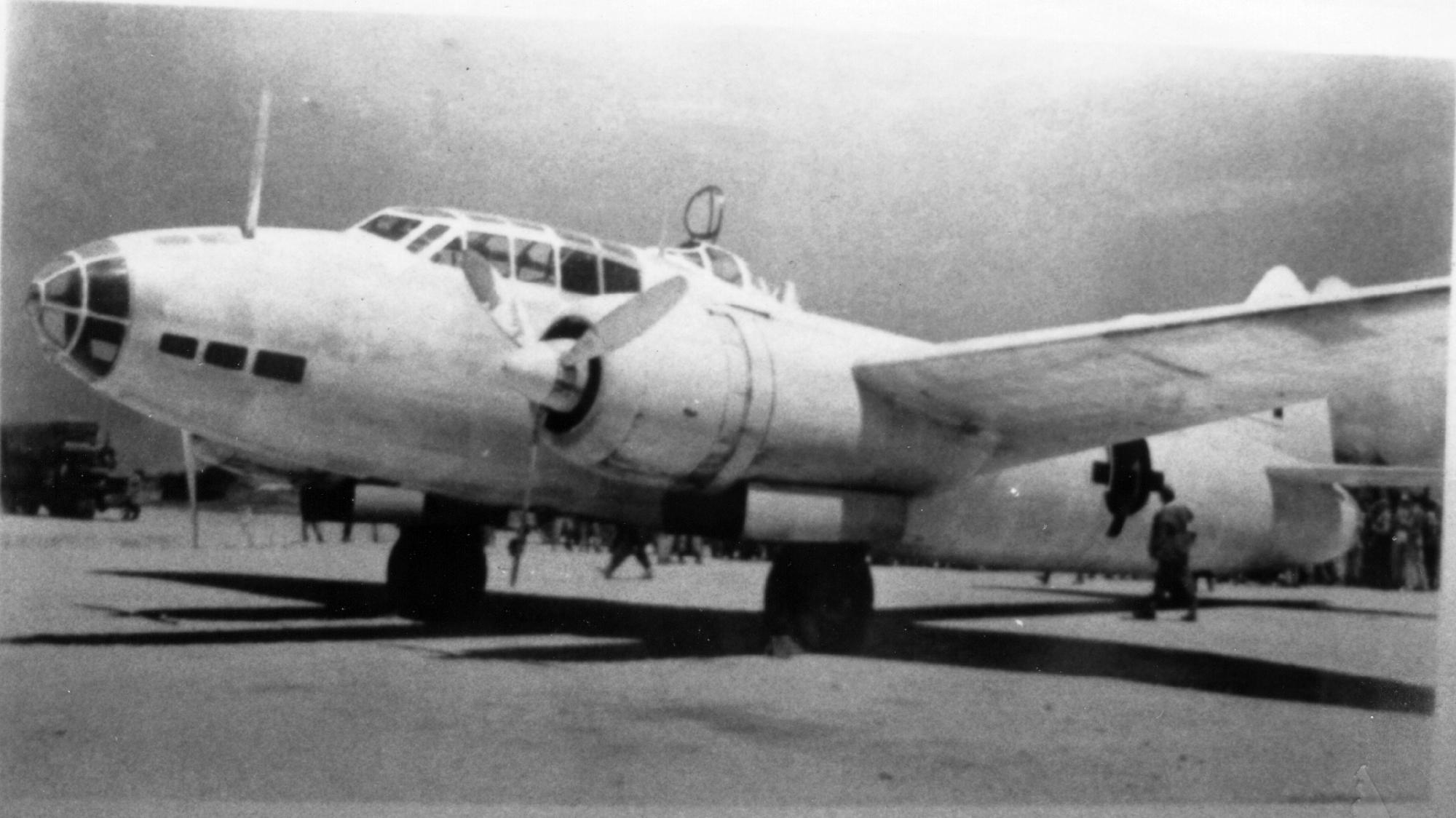
Bataan 1 and Bataan 2 on Ie Shima, 19 August 1945

Related development

- Mitsubishi G3M
- Mitsubishi G6M

Aircraft of comparable role, configuration, and era

- Bristol Beaufort
- Heinkel He 111
- Ilyushin Il-4
- Martin B-26 Marauder
- Nakajima Ki-49 Donryu
- North American B-25 Mitchell
- Savoia-Marchetti SM.79 Sparviero
- Vickers Wellington

Related lists

- List of aircraft of World War II
