= Alexander McKenzie (Medal of Honor) =

United States Navy Medal of Honor recipient (born 1837)

- Medal of Honor recipient
- Born: 1837; Glasgow, Scotland
- Died: Unknown
- Military career
- Allegiance: United States of America
- Branch: United States Navy
- Rank: Boatswain's Mate
- Unit: USS Colorado
- Conflicts: Korean Expedition
- Awards: Medal of Honor

Alexander McKenzie (1837–?) was a United States Navy Boatswain's Mate who received the Medal of Honor during the Korean Expedition. He was wounded in the rescue of Lieutenant Hugh McKee and was struck by a sword.

== Medal of Honor citation ==
Rank and organization: Boatswain's Mate, United States Navy. Born: 1837, Scotland. Accredited to: New York. G.O. No.: 169, February 8, 1872.

Citation:

On board the U.S.S. Colorado during the capture of the Korean forts, June 11, 1871. Fighting at the side of Lt. McKee during this action, McKenzie was struck by a sword and received a severe cut in the head from the blow.

== See also ==
- List of Medal of Honor recipients
