= Hugh McKee =

United States Navy officer

Hugh Wilson McKee
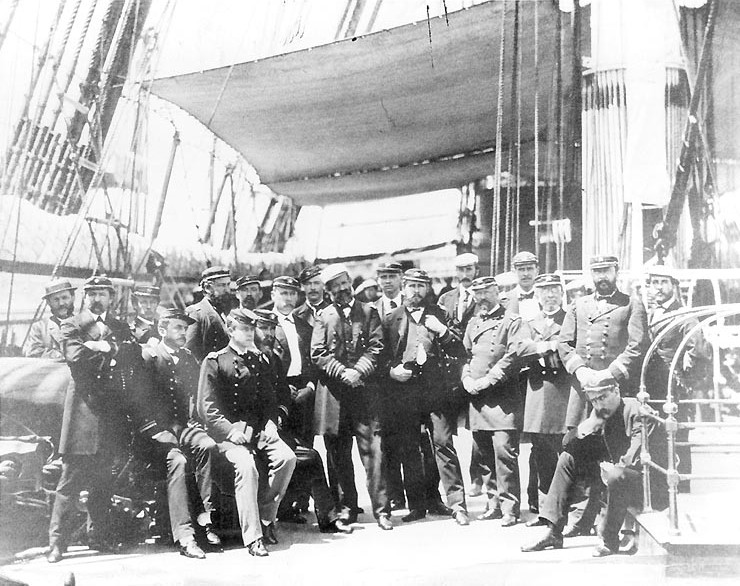
- McKee and other officers aboard the USS Colorado in June 1871
- Born: April 23, 1844; Lexington, Kentucky
- Died: June 11, 1871 (aged 27); At sea off the coast of Korea
- Military career
- Allegiance: United States of America
- Branch: United States Navy
- Service years: 1866–1871
- Rank: Lieutenant
- Units: USS Rhode Island; USS Franklin; USS Ticonderoga; USS Colorado
- Conflicts: Korean Expedition †

Hugh Wilson McKee (April 23, 1844 – June 11, 1871) was an American naval officer in the 1870s who participated in the United States expedition to Korea in 1871.

== Early life and military service ==
McKee was born in Lexington, Kentucky to a military family. His father, William R. McKee, was a US Army colonel who had been killed in action commanding the Second Kentucky Regiment in the Battle of Buena Vista during the Mexican–American War.

Hugh McKee was appointed to the Naval Academy September 25, 1861 and graduated in 1866. His early duty stations included service in the Practice Squadron and aboard the USS Rhode Island, flagship of the North Atlantic Squadron. In 1867–1869, he was assigned to the steam frigate Franklin and steam sloop of war Ticonderoga, both operating in European waters. McKee was promoted to ensign in March 1868.

== United States expedition to Korea ==
McKee had attained the rank of lieutenant by March 1870, and was serving in the Asiatic Squadron as an officer of the USS Colorado. He was mortally wounded June 11, 1871, while leading a company of bluejackets over the walls of a Korean fort on Ganghwa Island close by the Inchon beaches during the United States expedition to Korea. Fifteen sailors and Marines received the Medal of Honor for their actions during the battle including William F. Lukes, Alexander McKenzie, Samuel F. Rogers, and William Troy, who attempted to save McKee, as well as Frederick Franklin, who assumed command of McKee's company until relieved.

McKee died on board the USS Monocacy at 5:45 p.m. that afternoon and his body was sent to his ship, the Colorado, the next day. His remains were later sent to Shanghai and from there to the United States. He was interred at Lexington Cemetery. He never married and had no descendants. Three ships of the U.S. Navy have been named USS McKee in his honor.
