= James F. Merton =

United States Navy Medal of Honor recipient (1845–1900)

- Medal of Honor recipient
- Born: October 7, 1845; Cheshire, England
- Died: January 9, 1900 (aged 54); Saint Louis, Missouri, US
- Military career
- Allegiance: United States
- Branch: United States Navy
- Rank: Landsman
- Unit: USS Colorado
- Conflicts: Ganghwa Island; Korean Expedition
- Awards: Medal of Honor

James F. Merton (October 7, 1845 – January 9, 1900) was a United States Navy sailor who received the Medal of Honor for actions during the Korean Expedition in 1871. Landsman Merton was severely wounded during the seizure of the forts.

== Medal of Honor citation ==
Rank and organization: Landsman, U.S. Navy. Birth: England. G.O. No.: 180, October 10, 1872.

Citation:

Landsman and member of Company D during the capture of the Korean forts, 9 and 10 June 1871, Merton was severely wounded in the arm while trying to force his way into the fort.

== Death ==
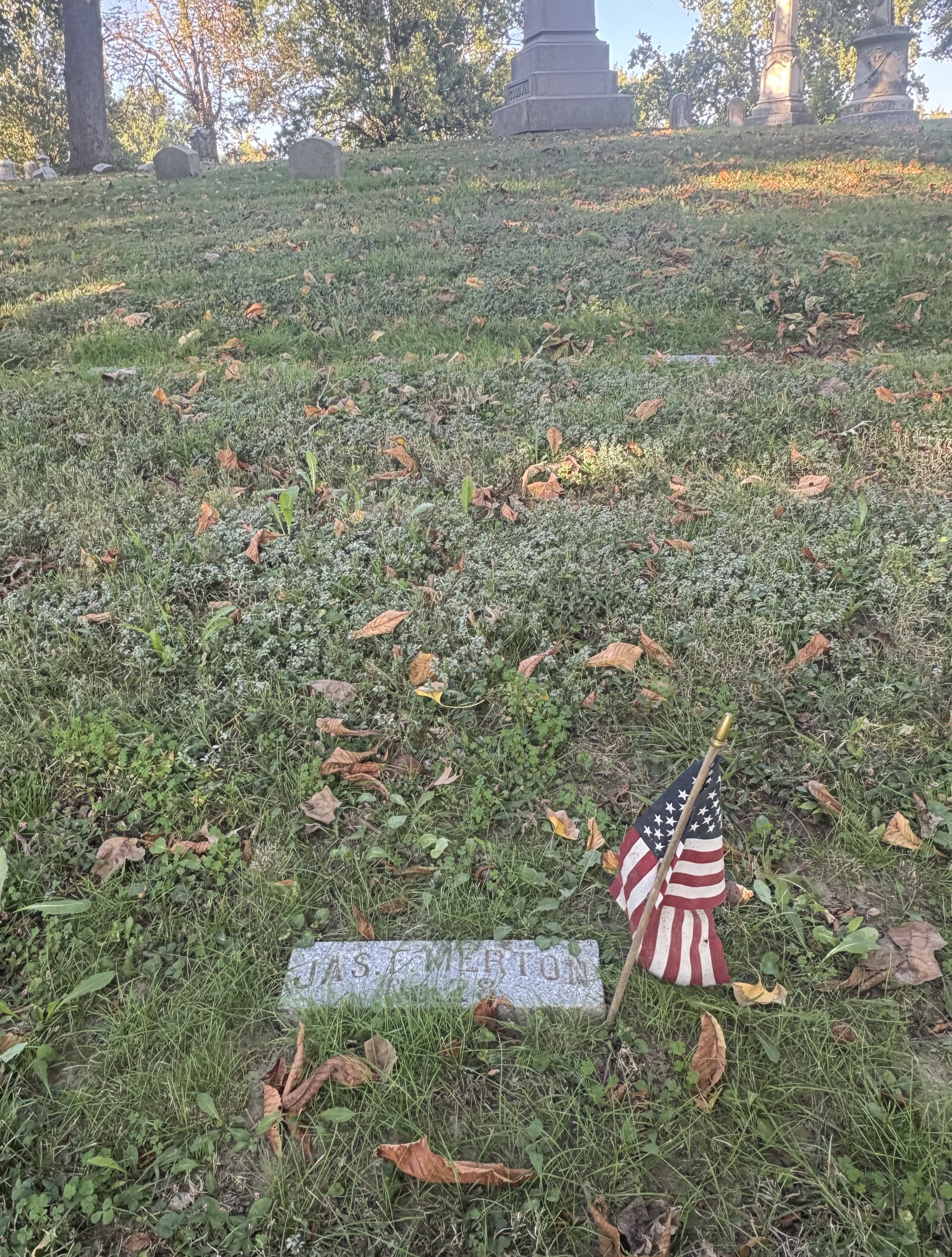
Merton's grave at Bellefontaine Cemetery

Merton died on January 9, 1900, and was buried at Bellefontaine Cemetery in St. Louis.

== See also ==
- List of Medal of Honor recipients
