= Sujagi =

Historical Korean military flag

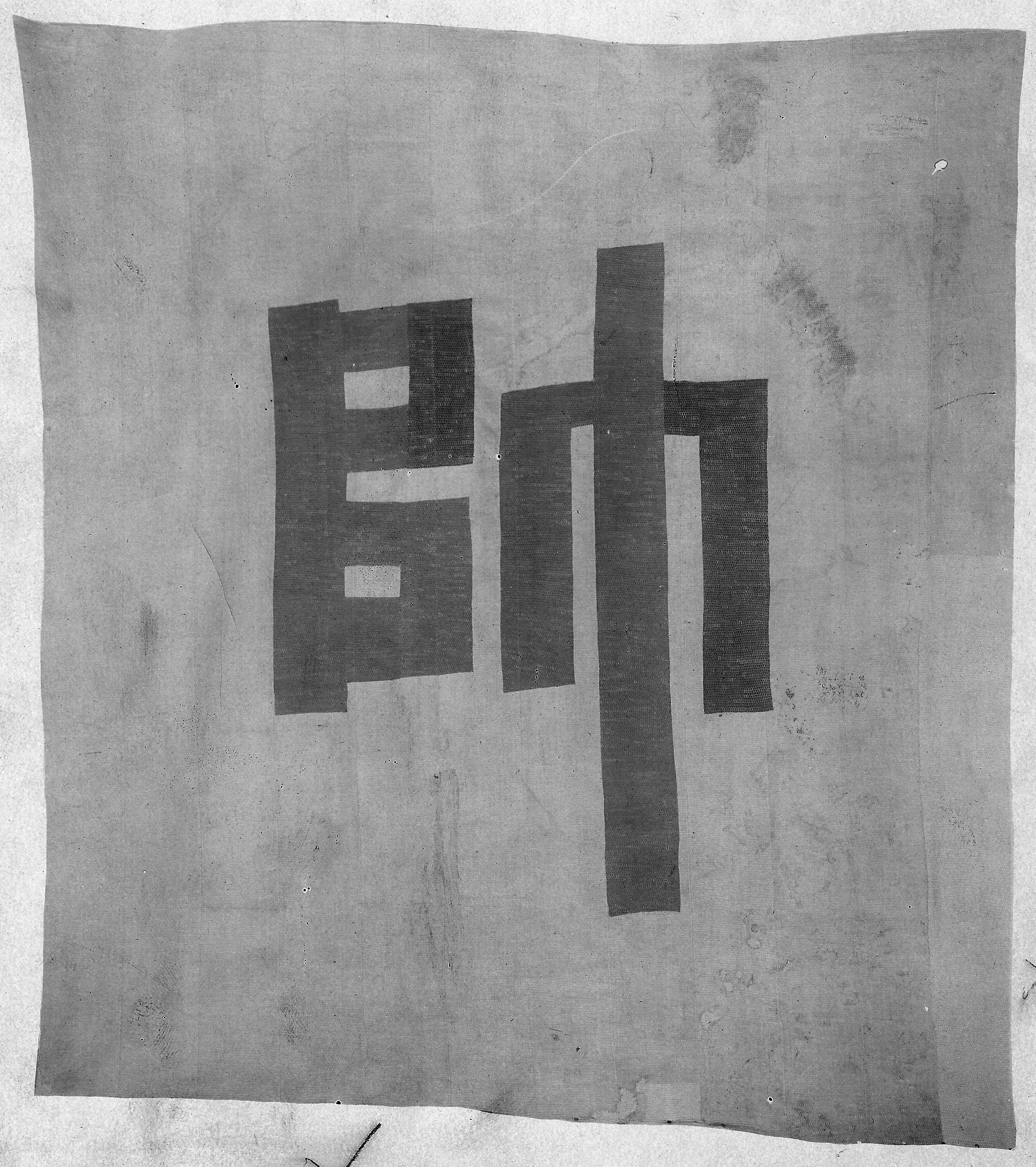
- Sujagi captured in 1871

Korean name
- Hangul: 수자기
- Hanja: 帥字旗
- RR: sujagi
- MR: suchagi

The sujagi is a flag with the hanja 帥, pronounced su in Korean, that denotes a commanding general. The whole term literally means, "commanding general flag". Only one sujagi is known to exist in Korea. The color is a faded yellowish-brown background with a black character in its center. It is made of hemp cloth and measures approximately 4.15m x 4.35m.

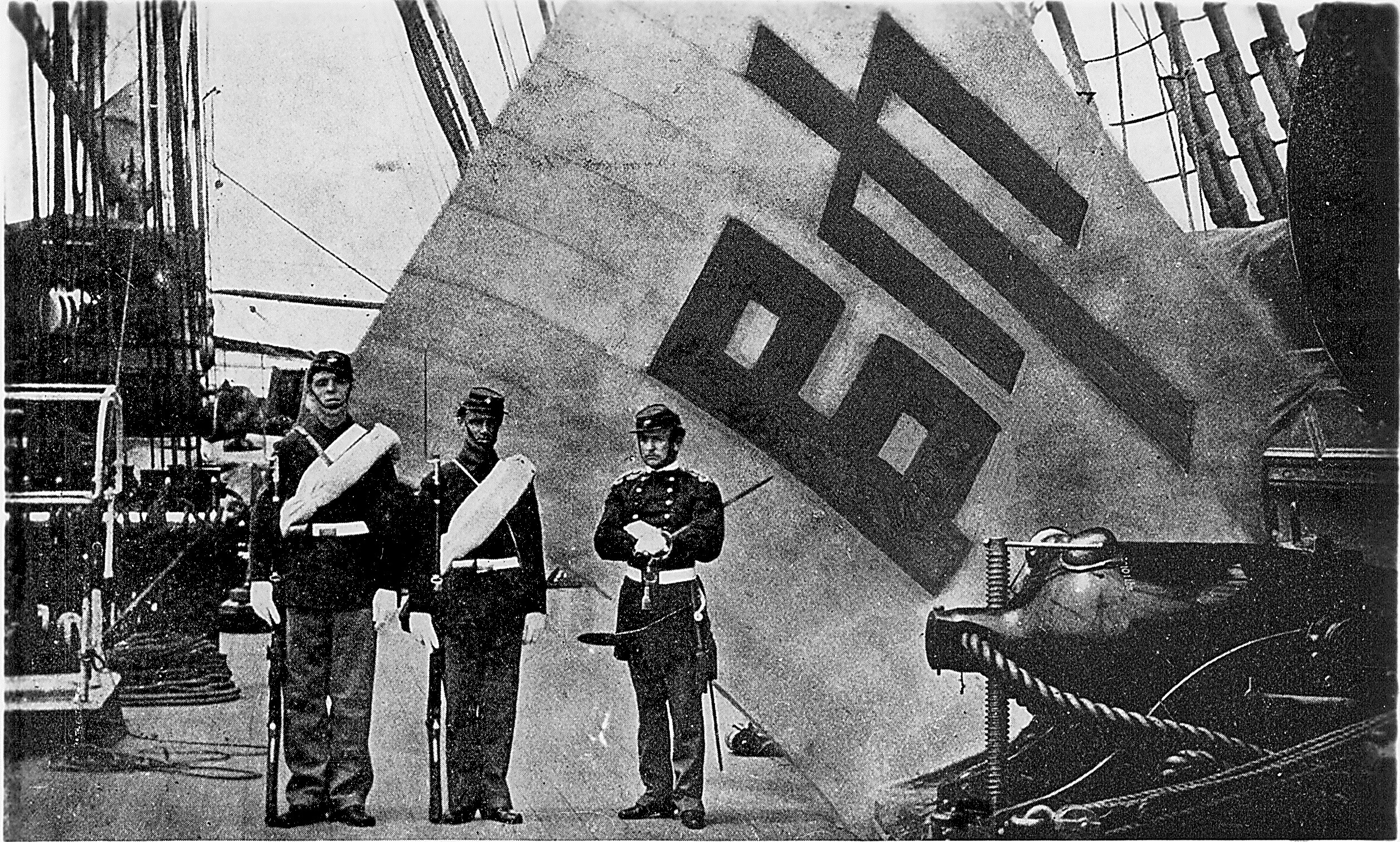
The captured Sujagi aboard USS Colorado in June 1871 during the United States expedition to Korea. In the foreground are United States Marines (from left to right) Corporal Charles Brown, Private Hugh Purvis, and Captain McLane Tilton.

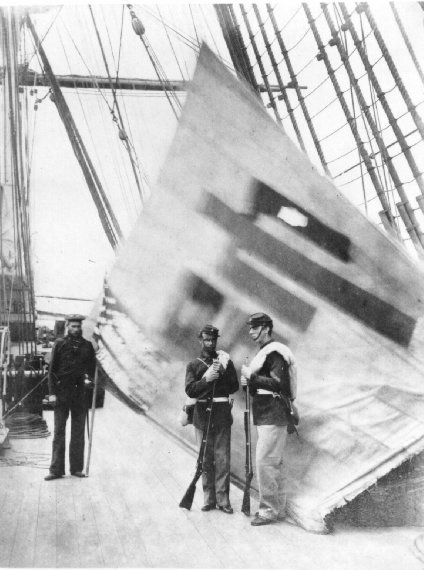
Captured Sujagi aboard USS Colorado. From right to left: U.S. Marine Corporal Charles Brown, U.S. Marine Private Hugh Purvis, and the sailor on the left is believed to be Cyrus Hayden (U.S. Navy). All three were awarded the Medal of Honor.

== History ==
This type of flag was put in a fortress where a commanding general was located. In the case of the extant sujagi in Korea, it represented General Eo Jae-yeon who, in 1871, commanded the Korean military forces on Ganghwa Island, which is off the northwest coast of present-day South Korea, near the capital of Seoul. It was captured by the United States Asiatic Squadron in June of that year during the United States' expedition to Korea. As with other war prizes, it was put into the collection of the museum at the United States Naval Academy in Annapolis, Maryland.

In October 2007, after many years of petitions by South Korea to the United States government, the flag was returned to South Korea on a long-term, ten-year loan.

After being returned, it was displayed at the National Palace Museum of Korea in Seoul until 2009, when it was moved to the Ganghwa History Museum on Ganghwa Island. As of September 2022, the lease had been renewed for the flag to stay in South Korea until at least October 2023.

Digital Variant

== See also ==
- History of Korea
- Military history of Korea
- Joseon dynasty
