= Michael Owens =

Michael Owens may refer to:

- Michael Owens (cricketer) (born 1969), former New Zealand cricketer
- Michael Owens (Medal of Honor) (1837–1890), United States Marine Corps Medal of Honor recipient
- Michael Joseph Owens (1859–1923), American inventor
- Michael Owens (politician), American politician
- Michael Owens (visual effects artist), American assistant director and visual effects artist
- Michael Owens (footballer) (born 2003), Peruvian footballer

== See also ==
- Michael Owen (disambiguation)
