= Hugh Purvis =

United States Marine Corps Medal of Honor recipient

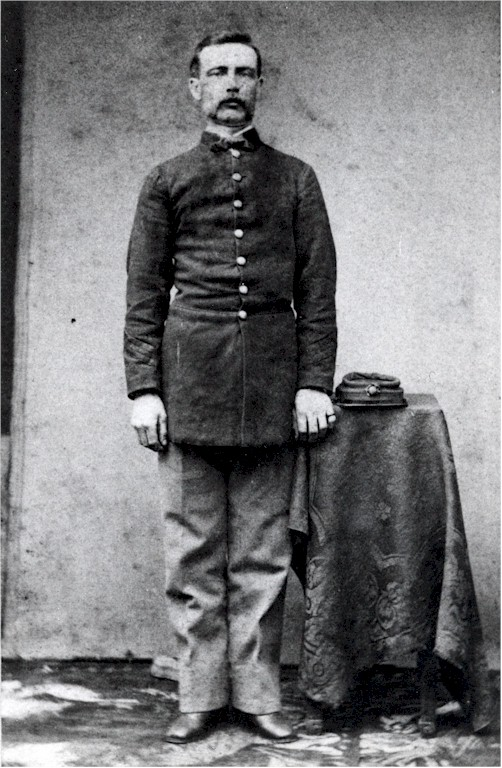
- Hugh Purvis USMC (January 1871)
- Born: March 5, 1840; Philadelphia, Pennsylvania
- Died: February 12, 1922 (aged 81); Unknown
- Burial place: Saint Anne Cemetery; Annapolis, Maryland
- Military career
- Allegiance: United States
- Branch: United States Marine Corps
- Service years: 1869–1873, 1874–1884
- Rank: Corporal
- Unit: USS Alaska
- Conflicts: Korean Expedition of 1871
- Awards: Medal of Honor

Hugh Purvis (March 5, 1840 – February 12, 1922) was a United States Marine who received the Medal of Honor for actions on board the USS Alaska during the United States 1871 expedition to Korea.

== Biography ==
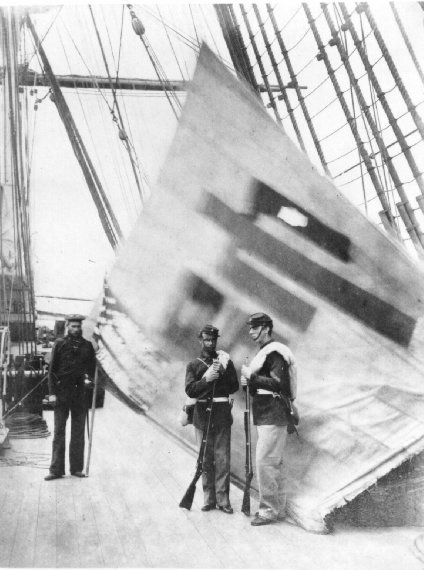
Aboard USS Colorado, June 1871: (right to left) Cpl Charles Brown, Pvt Hugh Purvis, possibly Cyrus Hayden.

Born in Philadelphia, Pennsylvania, Purvis enlisted in the Marine Corps on October 27, 1869. He reported immediately to the Marine Detachment aboard the USS Alaska soon departing for the Far East. During the punitive expedition to Korea, he took part in the assault on an enemy fort on the Han River. In desperate hand-to-hand fighting, the sailors and Marines stormed the walls of the citadel. Private Purvis ran immediately to the flagstaff which bore the Korean colors and loosed the halyards. He was joined by Cpl Charles Brown, and the two tore down the flag. For his "inspiring and heroic" act, Purvis received the Medal of Honor.

He was discharged in 1873 and served two additional tours with the Marine Corps, 1874 to 1879 and 1879 to 1884, rising to the rank of corporal. He is buried in Saint Annes Cemetery, Annapolis, Maryland.

== Namesake ==
- USS Hugh Purvis (DD-709), a U.S. Navy Allen M. Sumner-class destroyer, was named in his honor.
- Purvis Road on Marine Corps Base Quantico is named in his honor.

== Medal of Honor citation ==
Rank and organization: Private, U.S. Marine Corps. Born: March 5, 1846, Philadelphia, Pa. Accredited to: Pennsylvania. G.O. No.: 169, February 8, 1872.

Citation:

On board the U.S.S. Alaska during the attack on and capture of the Korean forts, 11 June 1871. Braving the enemy fire, Purvis was the first to scale the walls of the fort and capture the flag of the Korean forces.

== See also ==
- List of Medal of Honor recipients
