= Michael Owens (Medal of Honor) =

United States Marine Corps Medal of Honor recipient

- Medal of Honor recipient
- Born: February 6, 1837; New York City, New York, U.S.
- Died: December 8, 1890 (aged 53); Philadelphia, Pennsylvania, U.S.
- Burial place: Mount Moriah Cemetery, Philadelphia, Pennsylvania
- Military career
- Allegiance: United States of America
- Branch: United States Marine Corps
- Service years: 1865–1888
- Rank: Sergeant
- Unit: USS Colorado
- Conflicts: Korean Expedition
- Awards: Medal of Honor

Michael Owens (February 6, 1837 – December 8, 1890) was a United States Marine who received the Medal of Honor for actions during the Korean Expedition of 1871.

Owens enlisted in the Marine Corps from New York City in August 1865, and was medically discharged in 1888.

He is buried in the Naval Plot of Mount Moriah Cemetery.

== Medal of Honor citation ==
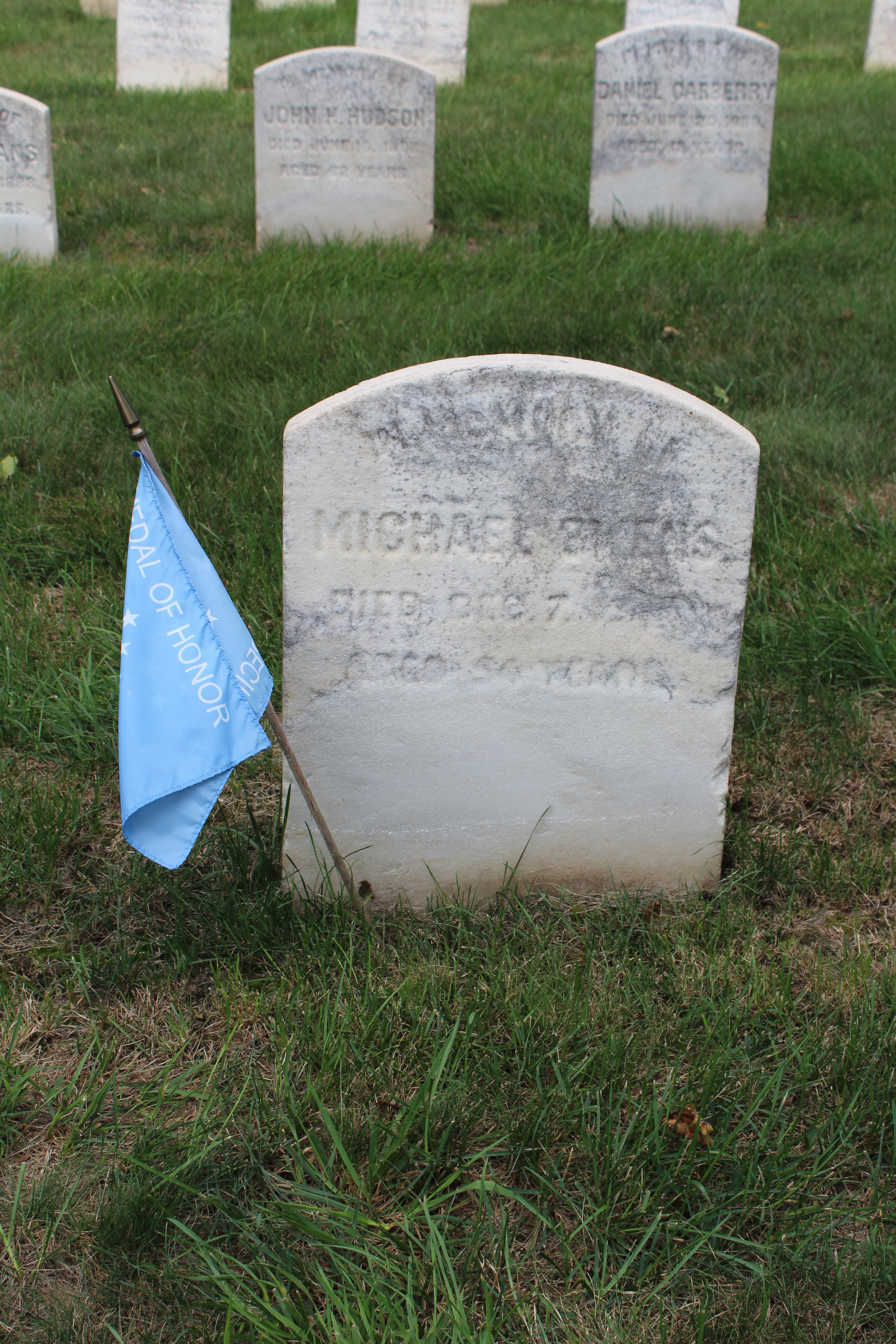
Michael Owens headstone in Mount Moriah Cemetery Naval Plot

Rank and organization: Private, U.S. Marine Corps. Born: February 6, 1853, New York, N.Y. Accredited to: New York. G.O. No.: 169, February 8, 1872.

Citation:

On board the U.S.S. Colorado during the capture of Korean forts, 11 June 1871. Fighting courageously in hand-to-hand combat, Owens was badly wounded by the enemy during this action.

== See also ==
- List of Medal of Honor recipients
