= Eo Jae-yeon =

Korean military personnel

- Hangul: 어재연
- Hanja: 魚在淵
- RR: Eo Jaeyeon
- MR: Ŏ Chaeyŏn

Eo Jae-yeon (Korean: 어재연; Hanja: 魚在淵; 1823–1871) was a Korean general who lived during the late Joseon Dynasty. He served as the inspector in the Hoeryong region in 1866 and led the army of Ganghwado Island against the United States military during the U.S. expedition to Korea in 1871.

Eo Jae-yeon was born in 1823. His father's name was Eo Yong-In. In 1841, at eighteen years of age, Eo Jae-yeon passed the military service examination, which was arranged at Ganghwado Island. In 1866, Eo Jae-yeon and his troops were able to defend Gwangseongbo Fort from French troops invading Ganghwado Island during the French campaign against Korea (1866). He was then appointed the minister of Hoeryong, where, among other successes, he was able to suppress a band of marauders. He also constructed a market in Hoeryong and revitalized border trade with the Qing dynasty.

When the American Asiatic Rogers' Squadron arrived on the coast of the island in 1871, the royal council appointed Eo Jae-yeon to serve as the Commandant. He exerted himself in this duty, and he and his brother, Eo Jae-sun, were killed by U.S. Marines during the military action. He was posthumously appointed the Minister of War. During the war, Eo Jae-yeon's flag, 'Sujagi' was taken by the American Squadron.

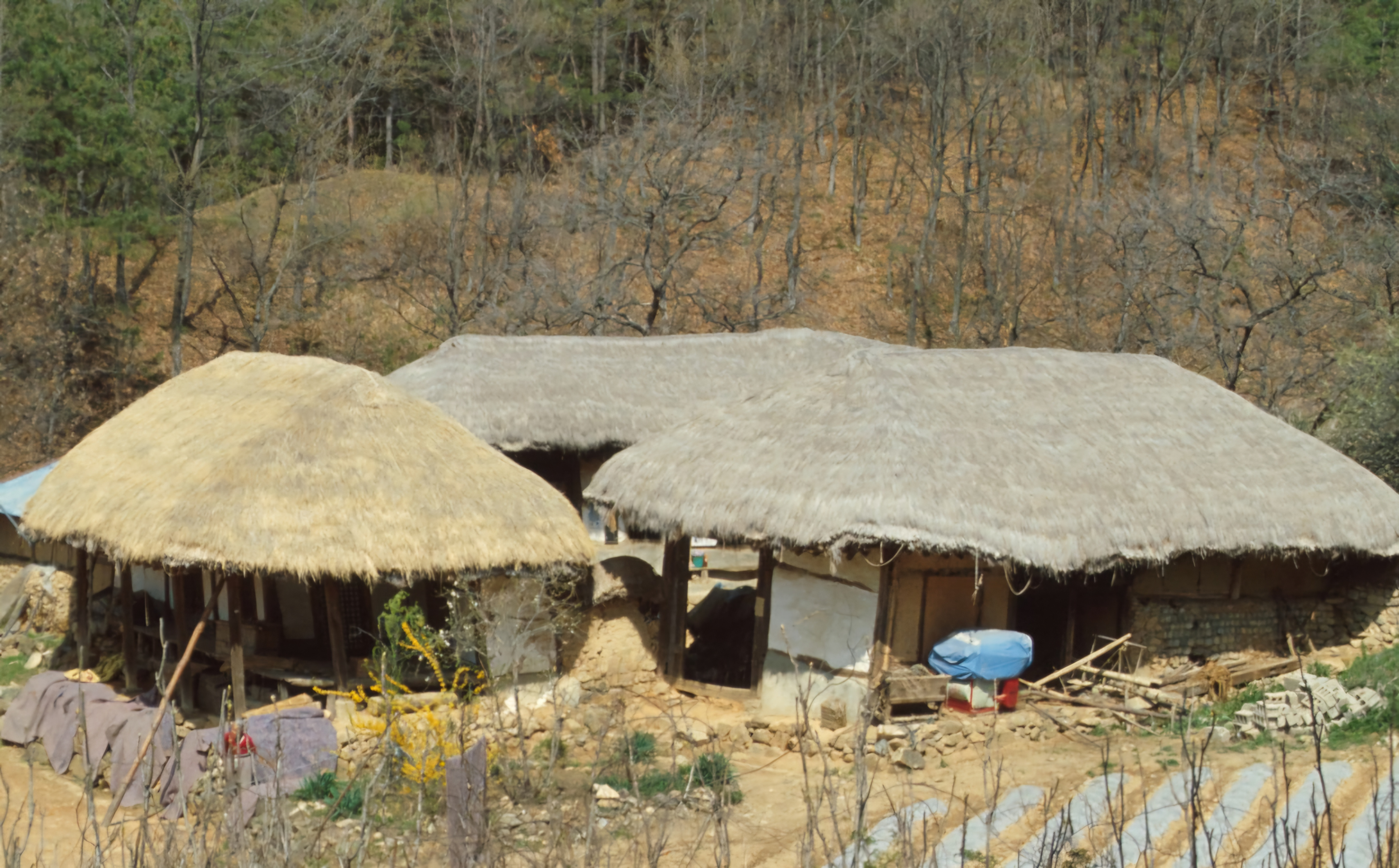
The Birthplace of Eo Jae-yeon, Icheon, Gyeonggi Province

== United States expedition to Korea ==
On May 16, 1871, five U.S. warships departed from Nagasaki, Japan to Ganghwado Island, carrying about 1,230 Marines and 85 cannons. The fundamental aim of the expedition was not full-scale war but gunboat diplomacy. About 240 Joseon soldiers were killed, 100 were drowned, and 20 were captured, whereas only three of the U.S. Marines were killed and ten were injured.

However, the U.S. forces could not achieve their original purpose of establishing a treaty for protection of the shipwrecked mariners, along with a possible trade treaty; and thus, they departed to China.

During the United States expedition to Korea, Eo Jae-yeon had burned his bridges behind the Gwangsung camp with his six hundred troops. Eo had fought unsupported against the full-scale offensive by the United States. To defend against the United States' amphibious attack, Eo retaliated with cannon fire and fought to his death without retreating. The Marine who killed him, Private James Dougherty, was subsequently given the Medal of Honor. In the Maecheonyarok (Korean: 매천야록; Hanja: 梅泉野錄), a book of Hwang-hyeon, there is a record that 'Eo fought with his enemy using his sword. Even when Eo's sword broke, he kept fighting by throwing a lead bullet at the enemy. In the end, however, Eo Jae-yeon was stabbed to death by his enemy's spear and the enemy took Eo's head.' This record describes the desperate situation of the United States expedition to Korea.

== "Sujagi" Flag ==
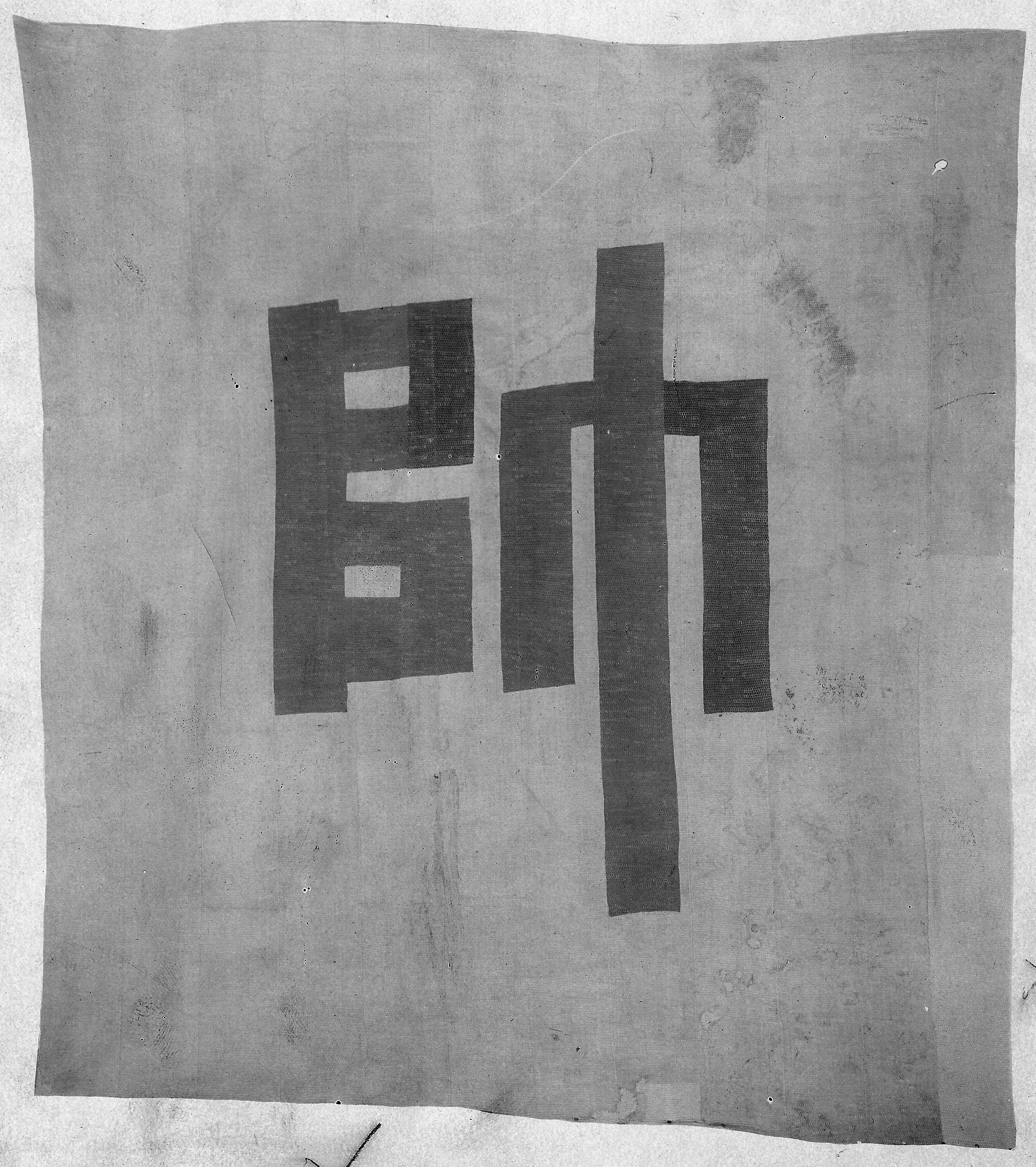
Eo Jae-Yeon's flag, the Sujagi.

Believed to be constructed of hemp or cotton and measuring approximately 4.15m x 4.35m, the rank flag 'Sujagi' bearing the Chinese character for "commanding general" was captured as a war trophy in 1871 when American troops seized Ganghwa Island during the U.S. Expedition to Korea. Restored in 1913, the flag was returned to the South Korean Cultural Heritage Administration in 2007 on a 10-year loan from the U.S. Naval Academy Museum, which has had possession for over 130 years. The flag is currently housed at the National Palace Museum of Korea in Seoul.

== See also ==
- United States expedition to Korea
