= Michael Owen (disambiguation) =

Michael Owen is an English former footballer.

Michael Owen may also refer to:

- Mickey Owen (1916–2005), baseball player
- Michael Owen (psychiatrist), Welsh psychiatrist
- Michael Owen (Australian politician) (born 1962), former Australian politician
- Michael Owen (Florida politician)
- Michael Owen (rugby union) (born 1980), Welsh rugby union player
- Michael S. Owen, former United States Ambassador to Sierra Leone

== See also ==
- Michael Owens (disambiguation)
