= United States expedition to Korea =

1871 U.S.–Joseon battle in Korea

Korean Expedition
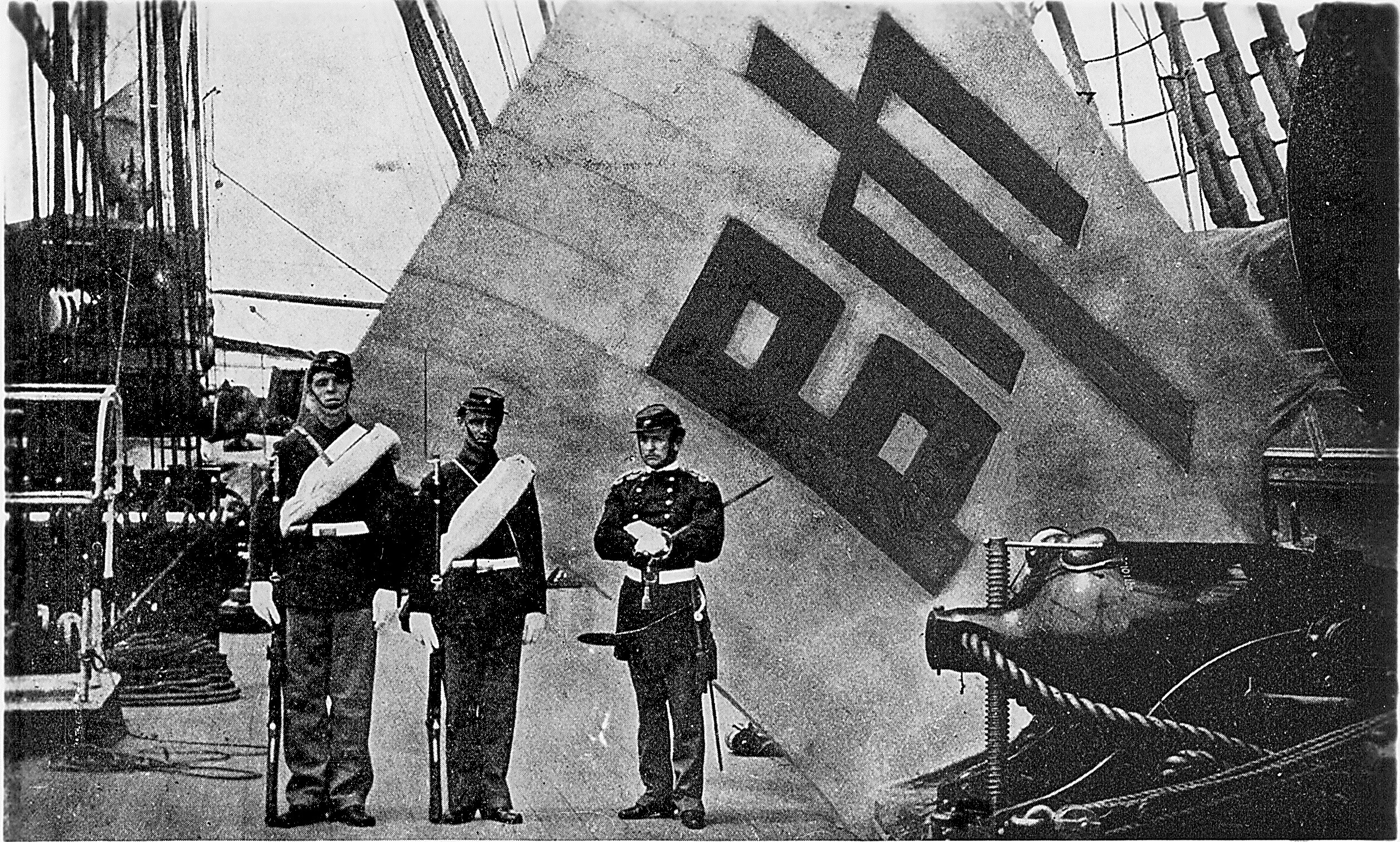
- The captured Sujagi aboard USS Colorado in June 1871
Date	1 June – 3 July 1871 (1 month and 2 days)
Location	Kanghwado, Korea 37.7000°N 126.4333°E
Result	Inconclusive: Successful punitive expedition and withdrawal; Korea retains isolationist policies

Belligerents
United States	Korea

Commanders and leaders
John Rodgers; Winfield Schley; Hugh McKee †	Eo Jae-yeon †; Eo Jae-sun †

Strength
650 troops; 1 frigate; 2 sloops-of-war; 2 gunboats	800 troops; 40 artillery pieces; 6 forts; 4 shore batteries

Casualties and losses
3 killed; 10 wounded; 1 gunboat damaged	243 killed (American estimate); ~350 killed (Korean estimate, likely including suicide); 20 captured (later released); 40 artillery pieces captured; 5 forts destroyed; 1 fort damaged; 4 shore batteries destroyed

- United States expedition to Korea
- Hangul: 신미양요
- Hanja: 辛未洋擾
- RR: Sinmiyangyo
- MR: Sinmiyangyo

The United States expedition to Korea, known in Korea as the Shinmiyangyo (Korean: 신미양요; Hanja: 辛未洋擾; lit. '"Western Disturbance in the Shinmi Year"'), or simply the Korean Expedition, was an American military action in Korea that took place predominantly on and around Ganghwa Island in 1871.

== Background ==
Frederick Low, the American ambassador to China, sent the mission to ascertain the fate of the merchant ship General Sherman, which had gone missing while visiting Korea in 1866. According to a National Interest article, Low's own records indicated the punitive campaign was motivated by a need to demonstrate American power over what he considered to be a weaker nation. Previously, the American commanders had felt entitled. They would "peacefully" enter Korean waters for survey and trade aboard heavily armed warships, all the while ignoring repeated diplomatic requests to respect Korean sovereignty.

Korean officials had sent letters holding the Americans responsible for unlawfully sending warships into their territorial waters, and also explaining to Low what had happened to the General Sherman. The governor of Ganghwa also sent what Low described as a "few worthless articles"—three cows, 50 chickens and 1,000 eggs—in an effort to de-escalate things. The Americans rejected the offer. Instead, they launched a punitive campaign after the commanding American admiral did not receive an official apology from the Koreans. The isolationist nature of the Joseon dynasty and the free trade ambitions of the Americans pushed a diplomatic standoff into an armed conflict.

== Initial contact ==
The American expedition consisted of about 650 men, more than 500 sailors and 100 Marines, as well as five warships: Colorado, Alaska, Palos, Monocacy, and Benicia. Embarked aboard Colorado was Rear Admiral John Rodgers, and Frederick F. Low, the United States Ambassador to China. The Korean forces, known as "Tiger Hunters", were led by General Eo Jae-yeon.

The Americans safely made contact with the Korean inhabitants, described as "people wearing white clothes". When they inquired about the General Sherman incident, the Koreans were initially reluctant to discuss the topic, ostensibly to avoid having to pay compensation. The Americans consequently let the Koreans know that their fleet would be exploring the area and that they meant no harm. This gesture was misinterpreted; Korean policy at the time prohibited foreign ships from sailing on the Han River, which led directly to the capital city of Hanyang, modern-day Seoul. Therefore, the Joseon government rejected the U.S. request. The Americans sailed anyway.

On 1 June, the Korean fortress fired at the U.S. fleet as it sailed up the Ganghwa Straits, which leads to the river. The U.S. forces were not badly damaged due to "the bad gunnery of the [K]oreans, whose fire, although very hot for the fifteen minutes in which they maintained it, was ill-directed, and consequently without effect." The U.S. demanded an apology within 10 days; there was no response so Rodgers decided on a punitive assault on the forts.

== Battle of Ganghwa ==
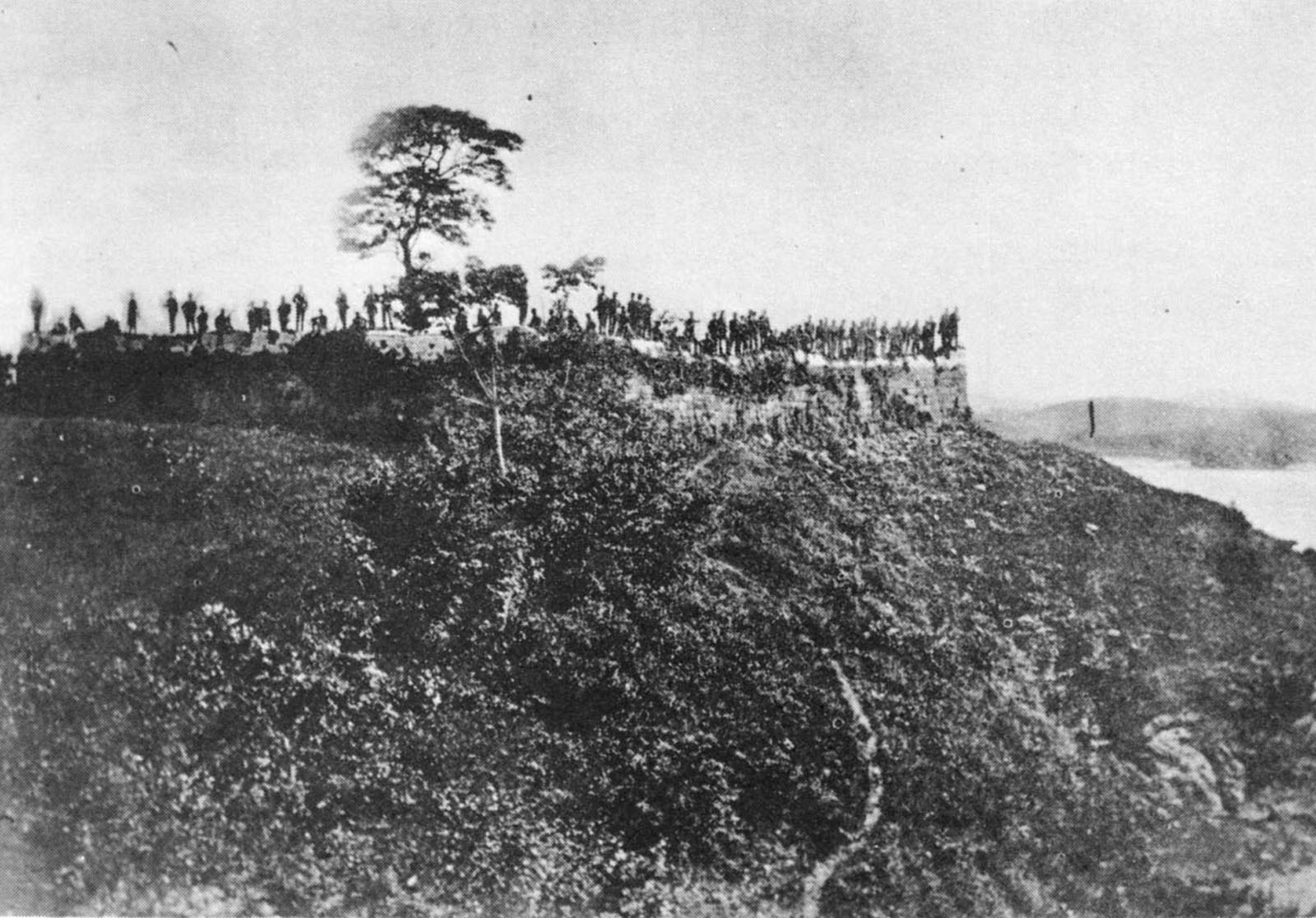
American servicemen after capturing Fort Dŏkjin (Fort Monocacy) on 10 June by Felice Beato

On 10 June, the Americans attacked the lightly defended Choji Garrison on Ganghwa, along the Salee River. The Koreans were armed with severely outdated weapons, such as matchlock muskets, cannons, and breech-loading swivel guns. After overrunning the Korean defenders, the Americans moved on to their next objective, the Deokjin Garrison. American 12-pound howitzers kept the poorly armed Korean forces from effective range. The American troops continued towards the next objective, Deokjin Fort, which they found abandoned. The sailors and Marines quickly dismantled this fortress and continued to Gwangseong Garrison, a citadel. By this time, Korean forces had regrouped there. Along the way, some Korean units tried to flank the U.S. forces but were beaten off again due to the strategic placement of artillery on two hills.

Artillery fire from ground forces and Monocacy offshore pounded the citadel in preparation for an assault by U.S. forces. A force of 546 sailors and 105 Marines grouped on the hills west of the fortress (infantry troops were on the hill directly west of the fortress, while artillery troops on another hill both shelled the fortress and also covered the Americans' flanks and rear), keeping cover and returning fire. Once the bombardment stopped, the Americans charged the citadel, led by Lieutenant Hugh McKee. The slow reload time of the Korean matchlocks aided the Americans, armed with superior Remington rolling block carbines, in making it over the walls; the Koreans even ended up throwing rocks at the attackers.

McKee was the first to make it into the citadel and was fatally wounded by a shot to the groin; after him came commander Winfield Scott Schley, who shot the Korean soldier who had killed McKee. The flag of the Korean commander, General Eo Jae-yŏn, called the "Sujagi" by Koreans, was captured by Corporal Charles Brown of Colorado's guard and Private Hugh Purvis of Alaska's guard. General Eo was killed by Private James Dougherty. While serving as the color bearer for Colorado's crew and Marines, Colorado Carpenter Cyrus Hayden planted the U.S. flag on the ramparts under heavy enemy fire. Corporal Brown, Privates Dougherty, Purvis, and Carpenter Hayden received the Medal of Honor.

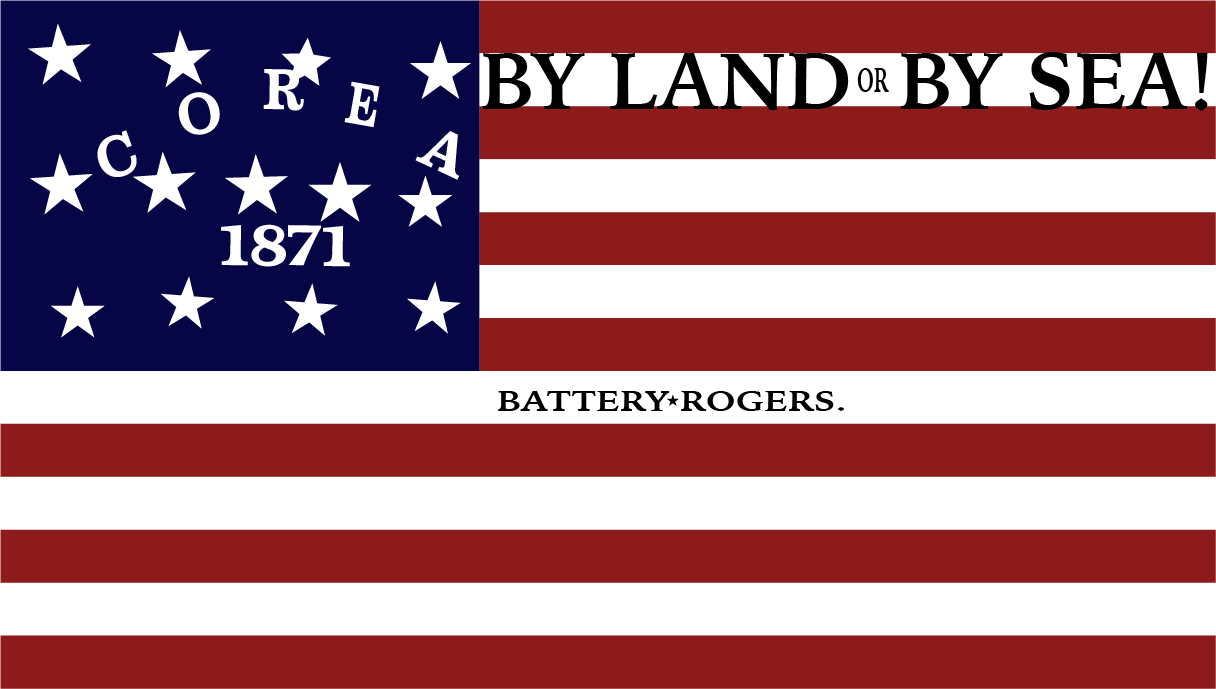
Unique American flag used during the conflict

The fighting lasted fifteen minutes. The total number killed was 243 Koreans and three Americans; McKee, Seaman Seth Allen, and U.S. Marine Corps Private Denis Hanrahan. Ten Americans were wounded, and 20 Koreans were captured, several of whom were wounded. Five Korean forts were taken in total, with dozens of small cannons. The Korean deputy commander was among the wounded who were captured. The U.S. hoped to use the captives as a bargaining chip to meet with local officials, but the Koreans refused, calling the captives cowards and "Low was told that he was welcome to keep the wounded prisoners." However, the Americans released the prisoners before departing.

Following the military operations of 10–12 June, the United States Asiatic Squadron stayed at anchorage off Jakyak Island until 3 July, when they left for China.

== Aftermath ==
The United States had hoped that their victory would persuade the Koreans to return to the negotiating table. But the Koreans refused to negotiate. In fact, these events led the regent Daewon-gun to strengthen his policy of isolation and issue a national proclamation against appeasing foreigners. Additionally the Koreans soon sent reinforcements in large numbers that were armed with more modern weapons to confront the American troops. Realizing that the odds had shifted, the U.S. fleet consequently departed and set sail for China on 3 July.

There were no further attacks on foreign ships. In 1876, Korea established a trade treaty with Japan after Japanese ships approached Ganghwa Island and threatened to fire on Seoul. Treaties with European countries and the U.S. soon followed.

Nine sailors (Chief Quartermaster Grace, Quartermasters Troy, Franklin and Rogers, Boatswain's Mate McKenzie, Ordinary Seaman Andrews, Carpenter Hayden, and Landsmen Lukes and Merton) and six Marines (Corporal Brown and Privates Coleman, Dougherty, McNamara, Owens, and Purvis) were awarded the Medal of Honor, the first for actions in a foreign conflict.

== Treaty of Amity and Commerce ==
From April to May 1882, the United States, represented by Commodore Robert W. Shufeldt of the United States Navy, and Korea negotiated and approved a 14-article treaty. The treaty established mutual friendship and mutual assistance in case of attack; and also addressed such specific matters as extraterritorial rights for American citizens in Korea and most favored nation trade status.

The treaty remained in effect until the Japanese annexation of Korea in 1910.

== Gallery ==
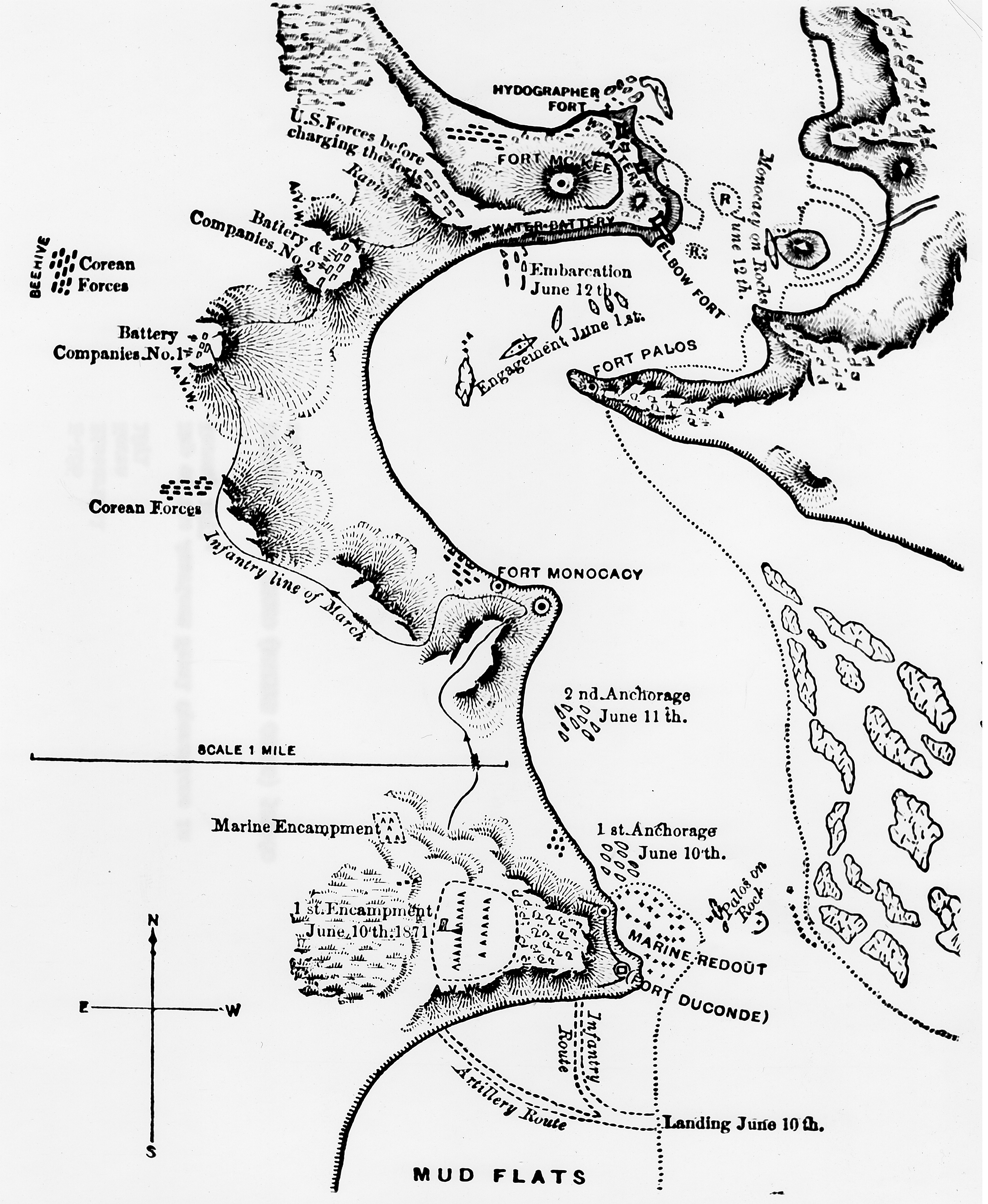
Map of the Ganghwa forts

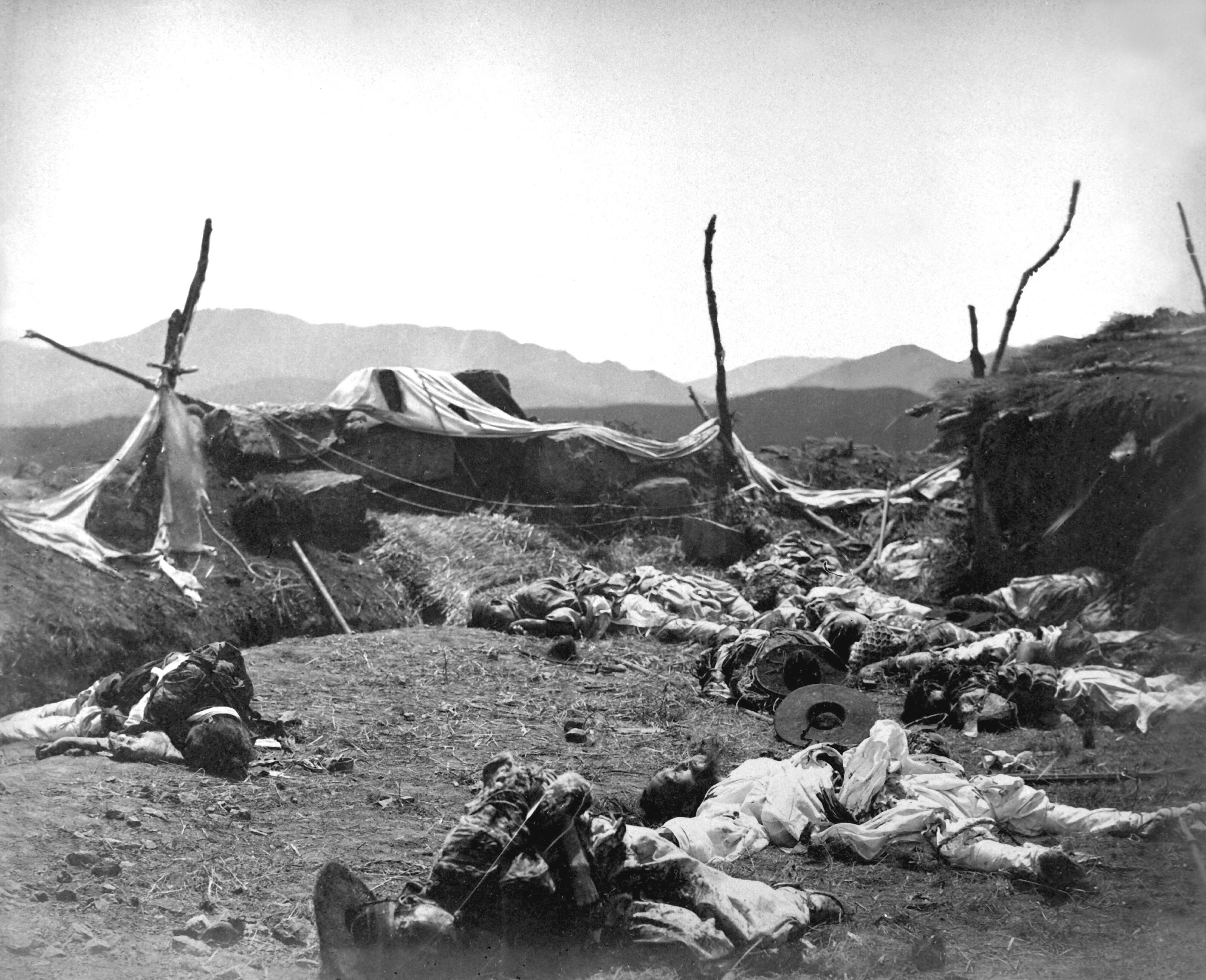
Korean casualties, after the attack on Fort Sondolmok (Fort McKee) by Felice Beato

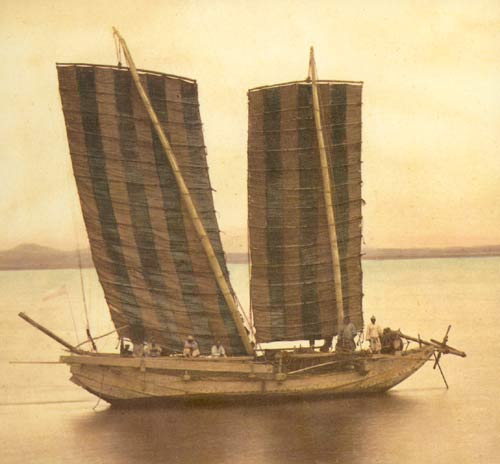
Korean ship in 1871, taken by the Americans during the expedition

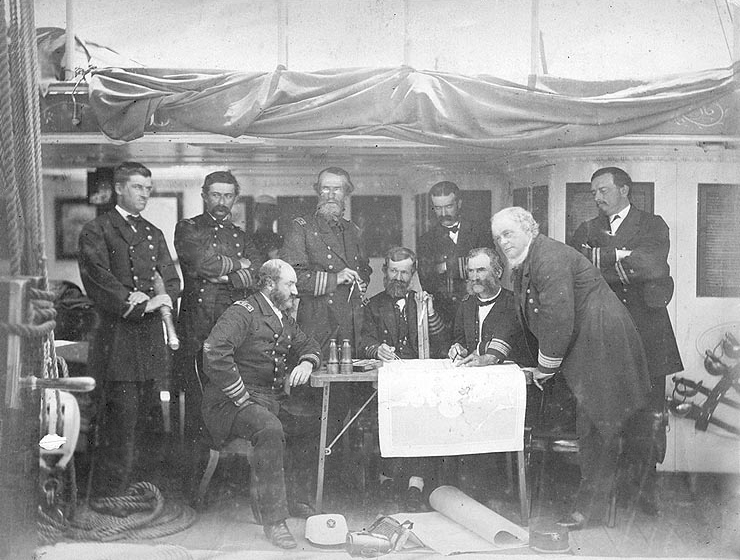
U.S. Navy officers holding a council of war aboard the Asiatic Squadron flagship, the steam frigate Colorado, off Korea in June 1871. The squadron's commander, Rear Admiral John Rodgers, leans over the table on the right.

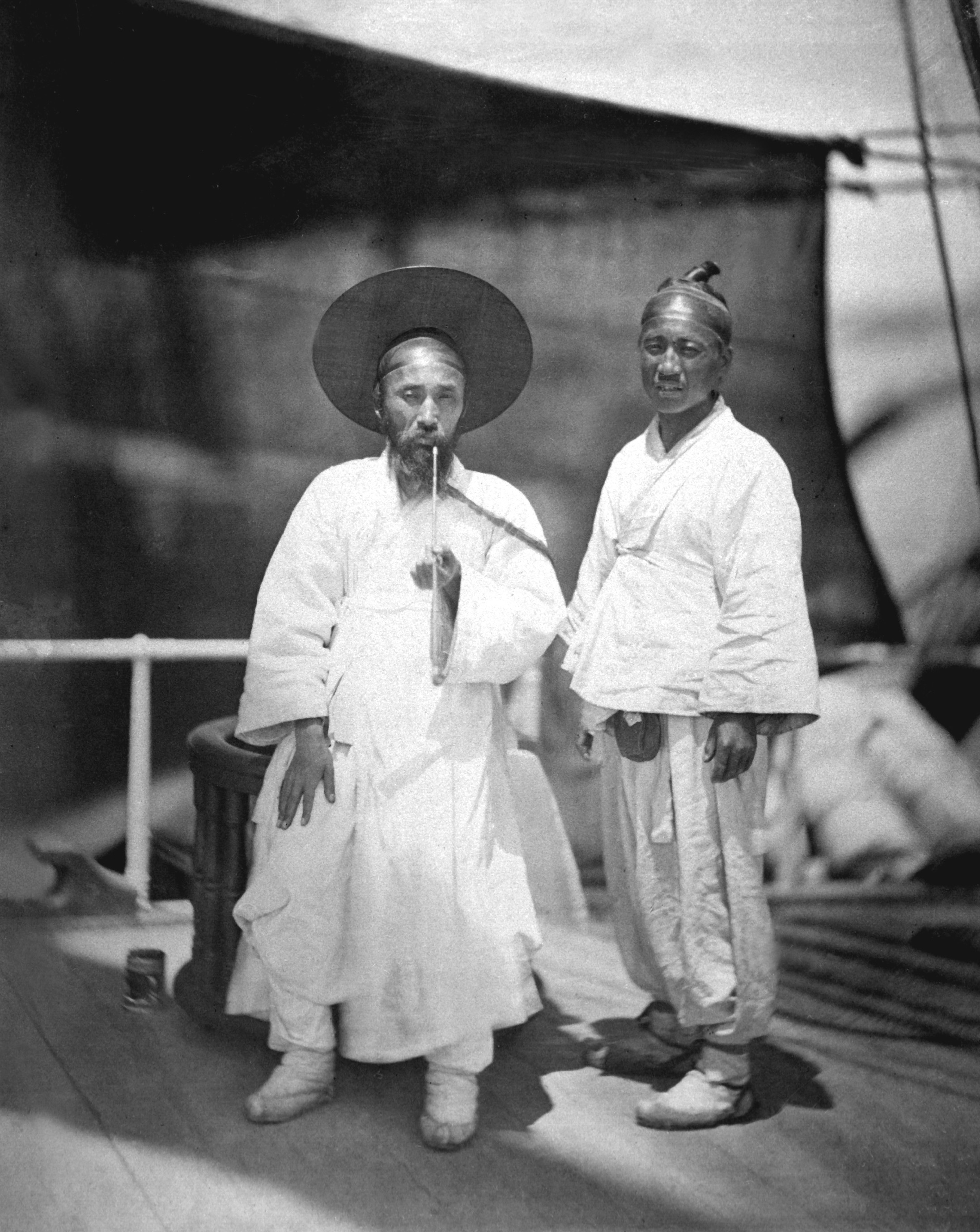
Korean official bearing the first dispatches on board the Colorado, June 1871

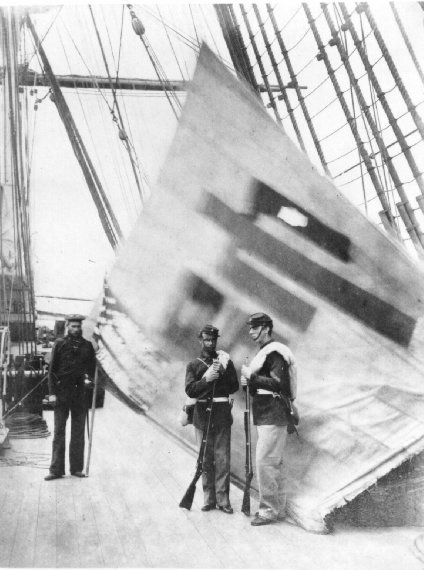
Captured Sujagi aboard USS Colorado. From right to left: U.S. Marine Corporal Charles Brown, U.S. Marine Private Hugh Purvis, and the sailor on the left is believed to be Cyrus Hayden (U.S. Navy). All three were awarded the Medal of Honor.

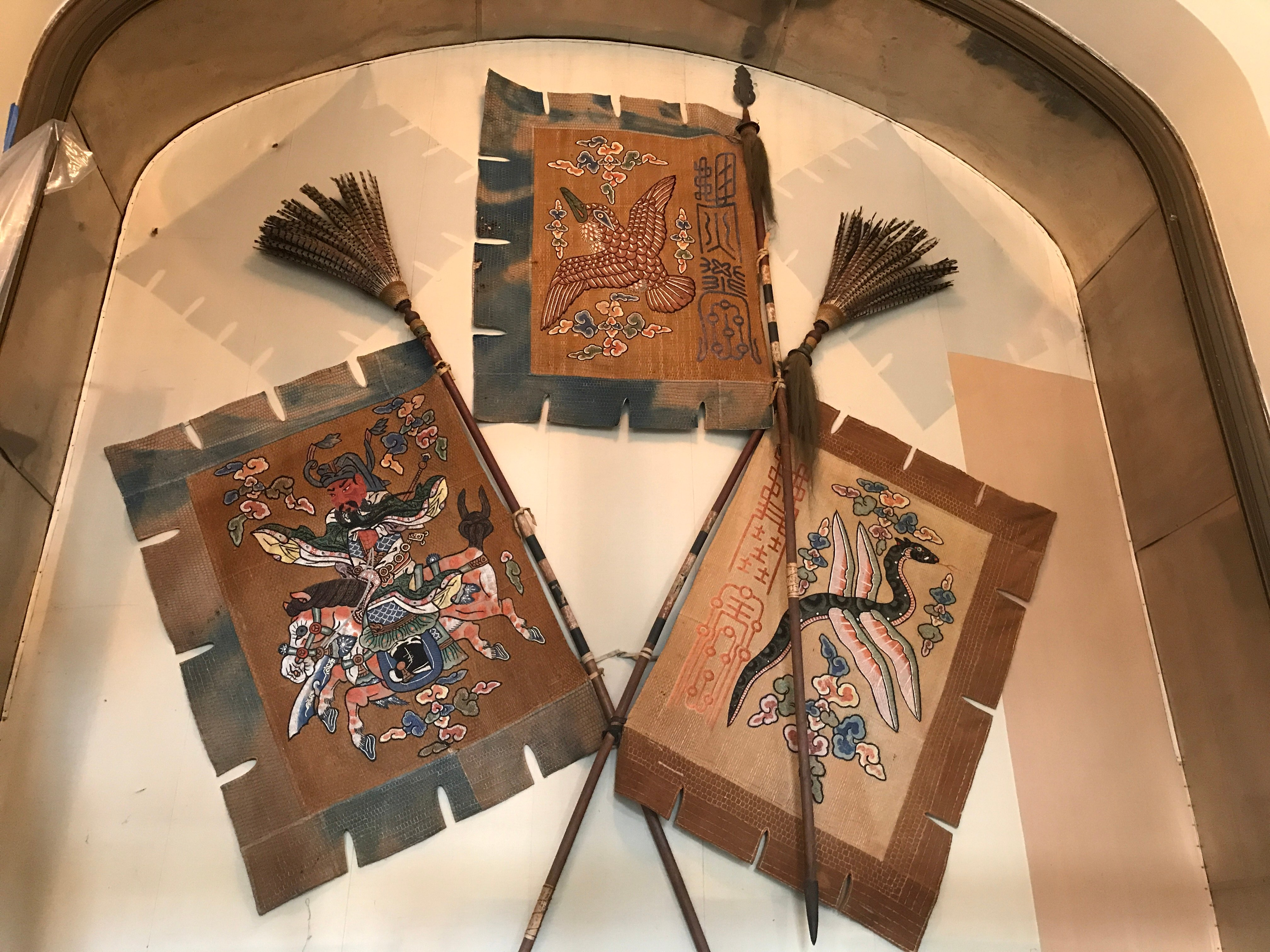
Other flags captured by the Americans during the battle

== See also ==
- Black Ships
- French expedition to Korea
- Ganghwa Island incident
- Ganghwasanseong Fortress
- History of Korea
- List of Medal of Honor recipients - Korean Expedition
- Military history of Korea
- Mr. Sunshine
