= USS Hugh Purvis =

Allen M. Sumner-class destroyer

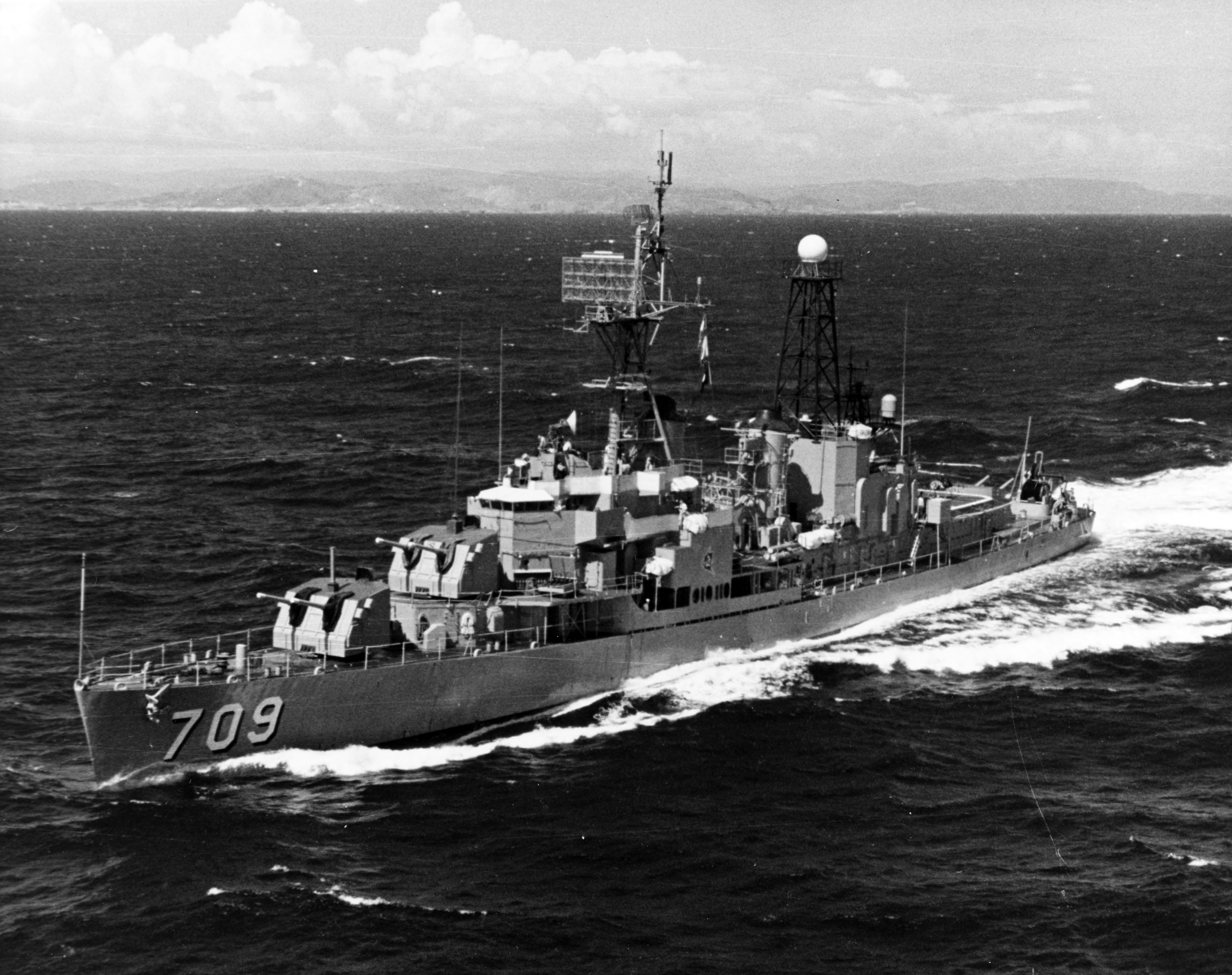
- USS Hugh Purvis (DD-709)

History

United States
- Name: Hugh Purvis
- Namesake: Hugh Purvis
- Builder: Federal Shipbuilding and Dry Dock Company
- Laid down: 23 May 1944
- Launched: 17 December 1944
- Commissioned: 1 March 1945
- Decommissioned: 15 June 1972
- Stricken: 1 February 1973
- Fate: Sold to Turkey 1 July 1972

Turkey
- Name: Zafer
- Acquired: 1 July 1972
- Stricken: 1993
- Fate: Scrapped in 1994

General characteristics
- Class & type: Allen M. Sumner-class destroyer
- Displacement: 2,200 tons
- Length: 376 ft 6 in (114.76 m)
- Beam: 40 ft (12 m)
- Draft: 15 ft 8 in (4.78 m)
- Propulsion: 60,000 shp (45,000 kW); 2 propellers
- Speed: 34 knots (63 km/h; 39 mph)
- Range: 6,500 nautical miles (12,000 km; 7,500 mi) at 15 kn (28 km/h; 17 mph)
- Complement: 336
- Armament: 6 × 5 in (130 mm)/38 cal. guns, 12 × 40 mm AA guns, 11 × 20 mm AA guns, 10 × 21 inch (533 mm) torpedo tubes, 6 × depth charge projectors, 2 × depth charge tracks

USS Hugh Purvis (DD-709) was an Allen M. Sumner-class destroyer in service with the United States Navy from 1945 to 1972. She was then transferred to Turkey and served until 1993 as TCG Zafer (D356). The ship was scrapped in 1994.

== History ==
USS Hugh Purvis is currently the only ship of the United States Navy to be named for Hugh Purvis, a Marine who served from 1869 to 1884 and was awarded the Medal of Honor. The ship was launched by Federal Shipbuilding & Dry Dock Co., Kearny, New Jersey, 17 December 1944; sponsored by Mrs. Mary Alice Purvis, widow of Corporal Purvis; and commissioned 1 March 1945.

=== U.S. Navy (1945–1972) ===
Following shakedown training in the Caribbean Sea, Hugh Purvis transited the Panama Canal to take part in training exercises in Hawaiian waters after the close of World War II, returning to Casco Bay, Maine, 16 April 1946. After a long overhaul at New York she trained in the Caribbean and arrived her new homeport at Newport, Rhode Island on 14 December 1946. Hugh Purvis sailed for her first European cruise 2 February 1947 and after exercises with allied ships in the north Atlantic, formed a part of the United States' official party at the burial of King Christian X of Denmark in April. The ship returned to Newport 14 August and took part in antisubmarine exercises off the New England coast the balance of the year.

Hugh Purvis departed Newport for her first cruise with the U.S. 6th Fleet 13 September 1948. For the next five months she took part in the fleet's vital work of peacekeeping. Returning to Newport 10 February 1949, she operated from that port until sailing 27 June for New Orleans. Hugh Purvis made reserve training cruises out of the gulf port until returning to Newport and regular fleet duties 10 December 1950.

As the demands on the Navy increased during the Korean War, Hugh Purvis continued intensive readiness training. She made another Mediterranean Sea cruise March to October 1951, and took part in another giant NATO cruise in August 1952. Another 6th Fleet cruise was completed in July 1953 after which the veteran ship embarked midshipmen for a Caribbean training cruise. She participated in Operation Springboard in the Caribbean before returning to Newport 23 November 1953.

Hugh Purvis spent 1954 on training operations the western Atlantic, but sailed 5 January 1955 for another important deployment with the 6th Fleet. She returned 26 May to join a hunter-killer group in antisubmarine exercises until July 1956. On 2 July she sailed again for duty in the troubled Mediterranean, joining other 6th Fleet units in that ancient center of civilization. During this period, American power afloat did much to dampen the Suez Crisis and to discourage foreign interference in this vital area. While in the Persian Gulf in October 1956, Hugh Purvis acted as an escort vessel during evacuation of refugees from Haifa, Israel, and the removal of United Nations Truce Team officials from Gaza, Egypt.

During the summer of 1957, the destroyer took part in another midshipman training cruise to Chile and the Panama Canal Zone, and operated with NATO units in the north Atlantic. In early 1958 she trained in the Caribbean, sailing 12 June for visits to NATO countries in northern Europe. It was during this crucial period that the 6th Fleet was proving its peacekeeping power in the Lebanon Crisis, and was successful in preventing a leftist revolt.

After her return from Europe in August 1958 she began 16 months of training and experimental work with the Destroyer Development Group designed to increase her fighting capacity for the modern navy. In March 1960 she entered Boston Naval Shipyard to begin a Fleet Rehabilitation and Modernization (FRAM) overhaul, which included extensive refitting and the installation of a helicopter landing deck and hangar aft. Emerging with a greatly increased life span, the ship took part in antisubmarine exercises in January 1961, including the use of the new DASH antisubmarine drone helicopter. Hugh Purvis then sailed 8 March for her sixth deployment to the Mediterranean. During this cruise the fleet stood by for any eventuality during a deepening of the Berlin Crisis. The ship returned to Newport 4 October 1961.

In January 1962, Hugh Purvis, while attached to Destroyer Development Group Two, operated in the Atlantic recovery area, aiding in the recovery of Col. John Glenn's Project Mercury space capsule. Sonar exercises occupied her until late October, when the introduction of offensive missiles into Cuba precipitated another Cold War crisis. Hugh Purvis proceeded to Guantanamo Bay, where she remained on station to provide gunfire support to the Marines during the Cuban Missile Crisis. She returned to Newport 20 December 1962 and throughout the next year took part in antisubmarine exercises with antisubmarine warfare (ASW) carriers and helicopters in the Atlantic.

The year 1964 found her preparing for her annual operational readiness inspection and in February of that year she entered the Boston Naval Shipyard for a regular overhaul. After overhaul and a new radar radome mounted on a 30-foot (9.1 m) mast she began evaluation of a new ASW sensor. On 18 January 1965 she sailed from Newport to become an important part of Operation "Springboard". At the completion of competitive year 1965, Hugh Purvis was awarded two Cruiser Destroyer Force, Atlantic Fleet, departmental excellence awards in operations and weaponry. During the latter part of 1965 Hugh Purvis was adapted for a new conformed planar array sonar at the Boston Naval Shipyard.

Ready for action 21 January 1966 Hugh Purvis operated along the Atlantic coast and in the Caribbean through most of the year. On 6 March she rescued fishing boat Good Will II and her crew of five. The destroyer sailed for the Mediterranean 29 November, and transited the Straits of Gibraltar 7 December to join the 6th Fleet. She operated in the eastern Mediterranean into 1967.

Hugh Purvis underwent a regular overhaul period in early 1968. Following this, she trained at Guantanamo Bay, Cuba in preparation for a Western Pacific deployment. She departed on this deployment in August, arriving on station off Vietnam in support of carrier and gunfire support operations. During this time, she was responsible for salvage and recovery of USS Safeguard. For her service during this deployment, she was awarded the Meritorious Unit Commendation and Combat Action Ribbon.

Following this deployment, Hugh Purvis transferred from the Destroyer Development Group to Destroyer Division 102. In the summer of 1969, she participated in training exercises in the Caribbean and served as a training ship for destroyer school. In November, she participated in searching and rescue operations for SS Koa. In 1970 she once again trained at Guantanamo Bay in anticipation of her final deployment to the Mediterranean.

=== Turkish Navy (1972–1994) ===
Hugh Purvis was decommissioned 15 June 1972. She would then be sold to Turkey 1 July 1972, and renamed TCG Zafer (D 356). She served the Turkish navy until 1993, when the ship was returned to the United States. In 1994 the ship was broken up for scrap.
