= Goryeosan =

Mountain in South Korea

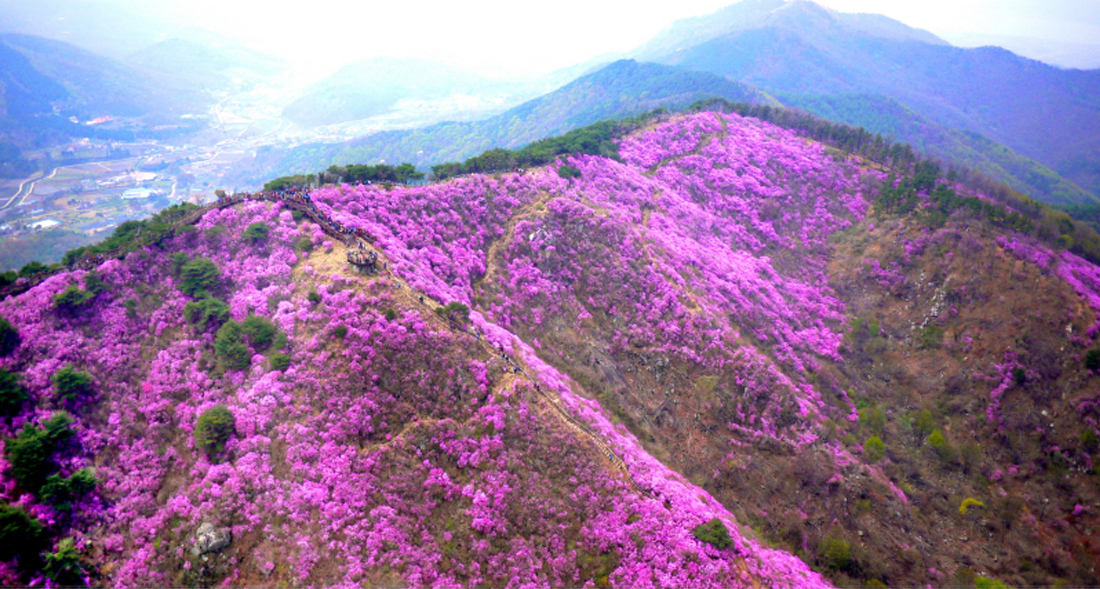
- Goryeosan Mountain, Ganghwa-gun.

Highest point
- Elevation: 436 m (1,430 ft)
- Coordinates: 37°45′N 126°26′E

Geography
- Location: South Korea

Korean name
- Hangul: 고려산
- Hanja: 高麗山
- RR: Goryeosan
- MR: Koryŏsan

Goryeosan (Korean: 고려산) is a mountain in Incheon, South Korea. It has an elevation of 436 m (1,430 ft).

== See also ==
- List of mountains in Korea
