= Michael Owens (footballer) =

Peruvian footballer (born 2003)

Personal information
- Full name: Michael Omar Owens Gaona
- Date of birth: 24 June 2003 (age 23)
- Place of birth: Bellingham, Washington, United States
- Height: 1.75 m (5 ft 9 in)
- Position: Right winger

Team information
- Current team: Academia Cantolao
- Number: 27

Youth career
- Regatas Lima
- –2020: Academia Cantolao

Senior career*
Years	Team	Apps	(Gls)
2020–	Academia Cantolao	1	(0)
- * Club domestic league appearances and goals as of 05:00, 22 September 2023 (UTC)

Michael Omar Owens Gaona (born 24 June 2003) is a professional footballer who plays as a right-winger for Peruvian Primera División club Academia Cantolao.

== Club career ==
Born in Bellingham, Washington in the United States, Owens began his career with Regatas Lima in Peru, before a move to professional side Academia Cantolao. He made his debut for the club on 12 October 2020, playing the first half of a 2–1 Peruvian Primera División loss to Alianza Universidad.

== Personal life ==
Owens shares a similar name to former English international footballer Michael Owen, and stated in a 2020 interview with Depor that he sees a similarity in their style of play.

== Career statistics ==
=== Club ===
As of 22 September 2023.

Appearances and goals by club, season and competition
Club	Season	League			Cup		Other		Total	
Club	Season	Division	Apps	Goals	Apps	Goals	Apps	Goals	Apps	Goals
Academia Cantolao	2020	Peruvian Primera División	1	0	0	0	0	0	1	0
Academia Cantolao	2021	Peruvian Primera División	0	0	0	0	0	0	0	0
Academia Cantolao	2022	Peruvian Primera División	0	0	0	0	0	0	0	0
Academia Cantolao	2023	Peruvian Primera División	0	0	0	0	0	0	0	0
Career total			1	0	0	0	0	0	1	0
