= Charles Brown (marine) =

United States Marine Corps Medal of Honor recipient

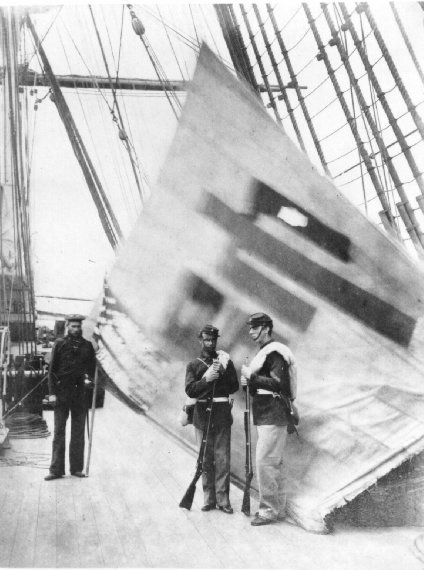
- Aboard USS Colorado in 1871 with a sujagi: (right to left) Cpl Charles Brown, Pvt Hugh Purvis, possibly Cyrus Hayden. Photograph by Felice Beato
- Born: 1849; New York City, New York, U.S.
- Died: Unknown
- Military career
- Allegiance: United States
- Branch: United States Marine Corps
- Service years: 1870–1871
- Rank: Corporal
- Unit: USS Colorado
- Awards: Medal of Honor

Charles Brown (1849–unknown) was a U.S. Marine who received the United States' highest honor for bravery, the Medal of Honor. He was born in New York City, and enlisted in the Marine Corps from Hong Kong in June 1870, aboard the warship USS Ashuelot. His Medal of Honor was approved under General Order No. 169, dated 8 February 1872.

There is no record of Brown having received his medal, as he deserted from the Marine Corps in Shanghai in October 1871, before the medal was approved.

== Medal of Honor citation ==
Rank and organization: Corporal, U.S. Marine Corps. Born: New York, N.Y. Enlisted at: Hong Kong, China. G.O. No.: 169, 8 February 1872.

Citation:

On board the USS Colorado in action against a Korean fort on 11 June 1871. Assisted in capturing the Korean standard in the center of the Citadel of the Korean Fort, June 11, 1871.

== See also ==
- List of Medal of Honor recipients
