= James Dougherty (Medal of Honor) =

United States Marine Corps Medal of Honor recipient

- Born: November 16, 1839; Langhash, Ireland
- Died: November 25, 1897 (aged 58); Brooklyn, New York
- Burial place: Cypress Hills National Cemetery
- Military career
- Allegiance: United States of America
- Branch: United States Marine Corps
- Service years: 1869 - 1893
- Rank: Private
- Unit: USS Benicia
- Conflicts: Korean Expedition
- Awards: Medal of Honor

James Dougherty (November 16, 1839 – November 25, 1897) was a United States Marine who received the Medal of Honor for his actions in 1871 during the United States expedition to Korea, while serving as a private aboard USS Benicia. His Medal of Honor was issued on February 8, 1872, under General Order No. 169. Private Dougherty was one of 15 United States sailors and Marines who received the Medal of Honor for this little known American military action.

Dougherty enlisted in the Marine Corps at Philadelphia on July 31, 1869, and retired on August 22, 1893. Originally interred at the Brooklyn Naval Hospital Cemetery until 1926, he was reburied in Cypress Hills National Cemetery, Section 6, Grave 12374.

== Medal of Honor citation ==
Rank and organization: Private, U.S. Marine Corps. Born. November 16, 1839, Langhash, Ireland. Accredited to: Pennsylvania. G.O. No.: 169, February 8, 1872.

Citation:

On board the USS Benicia, attack on and the capture of the Korean Forts June 11, 1871, for seeking out and killing the commanding officer of the Korean Forces.

== Online citation discrepancies ==
There appears to be some confusion about James Dougherty's Medal of Honor citation. Many online sources quoting Dougherty's citation include significant verbiage identical to that of Seaman John Henry Dorman actions during the American Civil War, to include service on board the USS Carondelet. This may indicate an erroneous early transcription of Dougherty's award citation, which appears immediately after Dorman's in early books listing Medal of Honor recipients, that has subsequently been repeated by various web sites.

== See also ==
- List of Medal of Honor recipients
