= Ganghwa Island =

Island in the Yellow Sea, South Korea

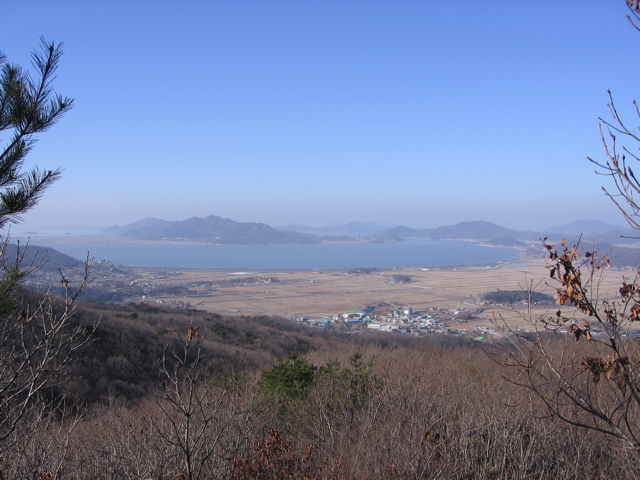
- View of the island from Manisan
- Interactive map of Ganghwa Island

Geography
- Location: South Korea
- Coordinates: 37.71°N 126.44°E
- Area: 302.4 km^{2} (116.8 sq mi)

Demographics
- Population: 65,500

Korean name
- Hangul: 강화도
- Hanja: 江華島
- RR: Ganghwado
- MR: Kanghwado

Ganghwa Island (Korean: 강화도), also Ganghwado, is an island in Ganghwa County, Incheon, South Korea. It is in the Yellow Sea and in an estuary of the Han River.

The island is separated from Gimpo (on the South Korean mainland) by a narrow channel spanned by two bridges, and from Kaesong (Gaeseong) in North Korea by the main channel of the Han River. It offers some of the closest views in the South of North Korean villages, which can be seen on clear days from less than two kilometers.

It is strategically located, controlling access to the river, which runs through former Joseon and South Korea's capital, Seoul. Its fortifications were repeatedly attacked in the 19th century. With an area of 302.4 km^{2} (116.8 sq mi), it constitutes most of Ganghwa County (a division of Incheon). The island has a population of about 65,500, half of whom live in Ganghwa Town (Ganghwa-eup) in the northeast.

== Name ==
Before the 10th century, the island went by various names, including Haegu (해구; 海口; lit. 'mouth of the sea'), Hyeolgu (혈구; 穴口; lit. 'opening'), Gangha (강하; 江下; lit. 'below river[s]').

In 940, during the Goryeo period, it received its current name, which means "beautiful [town by the] river".

Former romanizations include "Kang-hoa" and "Kang-hwa".

== Geography ==
The island is in the estuary of Korea's Han River. It is South Korea's fourth-largest island, with an area of 305.75 km^{2} (118.05 sq mi), and has a coastline of 106.5 km (66.2 mi). Over time, land reclamation projects for agricultural purposes have increased the island's size.

The island has a number of mountains. The tallest is Manisan, in the south of the island, with a height of 469 m (1,539 ft). Also on the island are Jingangsan (진강산), Goryeosan, Nakjobong (낙조봉), Hyeolgusan (혈구산), and Byeollipsan (별립산).

The island was originally connected to the mainland, but became separate over time via erosion. Mudflats now surround the island.

=== Climate ===
Climate data for Ganghwa (1991–2020 normals, extremes 1972–present)
Month	Jan	Feb	Mar	Apr	May	Jun	Jul	Aug	Sep	Oct	Nov	Dec	Year
Record high °C (°F)	12.6 (54.7)	17.4 (63.3)	22.3 (72.1)	29.2 (84.6)	31.0 (87.8)	33.2 (91.8)	35.5 (95.9)	35.8 (96.4)	31.7 (89.1)	28.3 (82.9)	23.8 (74.8)	16.0 (60.8)	35.8 (96.4)
Mean daily maximum °C (°F)	1.7 (35.1)	4.5 (40.1)	9.8 (49.6)	16.2 (61.2)	21.4 (70.5)	25.4 (77.7)	27.6 (81.7)	29.0 (84.2)	25.5 (77.9)	19.5 (67.1)	11.5 (52.7)	3.9 (39.0)	16.3 (61.3)
Daily mean °C (°F)	−3.2 (26.2)	−0.7 (30.7)	4.6 (40.3)	10.7 (51.3)	16.0 (60.8)	20.5 (68.9)	23.7 (74.7)	24.7 (76.5)	20.2 (68.4)	13.7 (56.7)	6.3 (43.3)	−0.9 (30.4)	11.3 (52.3)
Mean daily minimum °C (°F)	−8.1 (17.4)	−5.8 (21.6)	−0.6 (30.9)	5.3 (41.5)	11.0 (51.8)	16.3 (61.3)	20.6 (69.1)	21.2 (70.2)	15.6 (60.1)	8.1 (46.6)	1.2 (34.2)	−5.7 (21.7)	6.6 (43.9)
Record low °C (°F)	−22.5 (−8.5)	−19.4 (−2.9)	−11.3 (11.7)	−4.4 (24.1)	1.6 (34.9)	6.9 (44.4)	12.7 (54.9)	12.5 (54.5)	3.0 (37.4)	−4.2 (24.4)	−12.0 (10.4)	−19.8 (−3.6)	−22.5 (−8.5)
Average precipitation mm (inches)	15.6 (0.61)	22.5 (0.89)	31.4 (1.24)	64.9 (2.56)	110.9 (4.37)	110.0 (4.33)	355.6 (14.00)	300.4 (11.83)	131.5 (5.18)	55.8 (2.20)	46.3 (1.82)	21.3 (0.84)	1,266.2 (49.85)
Average precipitation days (≥ 0.1 mm)	5.0	4.8	6.0	7.5	8.2	8.6	14.1	11.9	7.4	5.6	7.5	6.6	93.2
Average snowy days	7.3	4.3	2.4	0.2	0.0	0.0	0.0	0.0	0.0	0.1	1.5	5.1	20.6
Average relative humidity (%)	63.6	61.0	61.4	62.4	68.6	75.1	82.8	79.9	73.8	68.9	67.8	65.4	69.2
Mean monthly sunshine hours	186.2	186.5	217.0	221.7	235.3	208.5	153.0	184.9	203.8	214.3	166.0	171.8	2,349
Percentage possible sunshine	58.7	61.8	58.9	59.0	54.8	50.0	38.6	47.7	57.4	63.3	55.7	55.6	54.6
Source: Korea Meteorological Administration (percent sunshine 1981–2010)

== History ==
The island was part of Ganghwa-hyeon in the early Goryeo period. It became part of Ganghwa-bu in 1377. It became part of Ganghwa County in Gyeonggi Province (Keiki-dō) in 1914, and remained so until 1994, when it became part of Incheon Metropolitan City.

The island was the site of the 1866 French expedition to Korea, the 1871 United States expedition to Korea, the Battle of Ganghwa, and the 1875 Ganghwa Island incident with Japan. In 1876 Korea was forced to sign with Japan the Treaty of Ganghwa, which was named for the island.

== Transportation ==
In 1969, the Ganghwa Bridge was constructed between the island and the mainland. The bridge was replaced in 1997. The Ganghwa Choji Bridge opened in 2002.

== Tourism ==
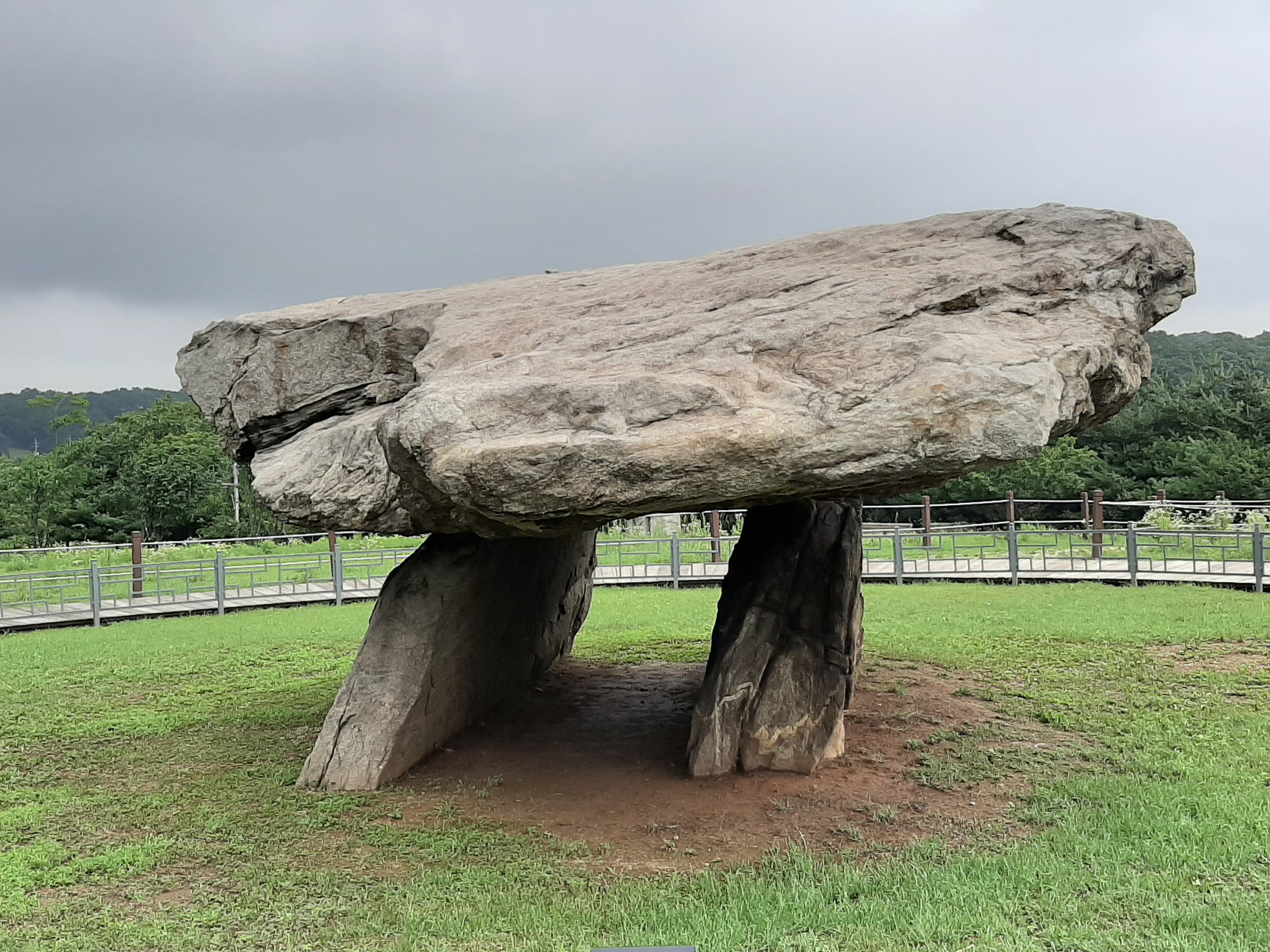
A dolmen at Ganghwa (2019)

The island has stone tombs that are part of the UNESCO World Heritage Site series Gochang, Hwasun and Ganghwa Dolmen Sites.

Ganghwa Nadeulgil is a 20-trail walking tour, illustrating the mudflat ecology and avian migratory habitats from prehistory to the Joseon dynasty.

Seongmodo is a level 10-mile (16 km) trail through a forest and the island's only beach, ending at a temple.

Pungmul Market is a food market selling grain, vegetables, fruits, seafood, meat, fish, tofu, and ginseng.

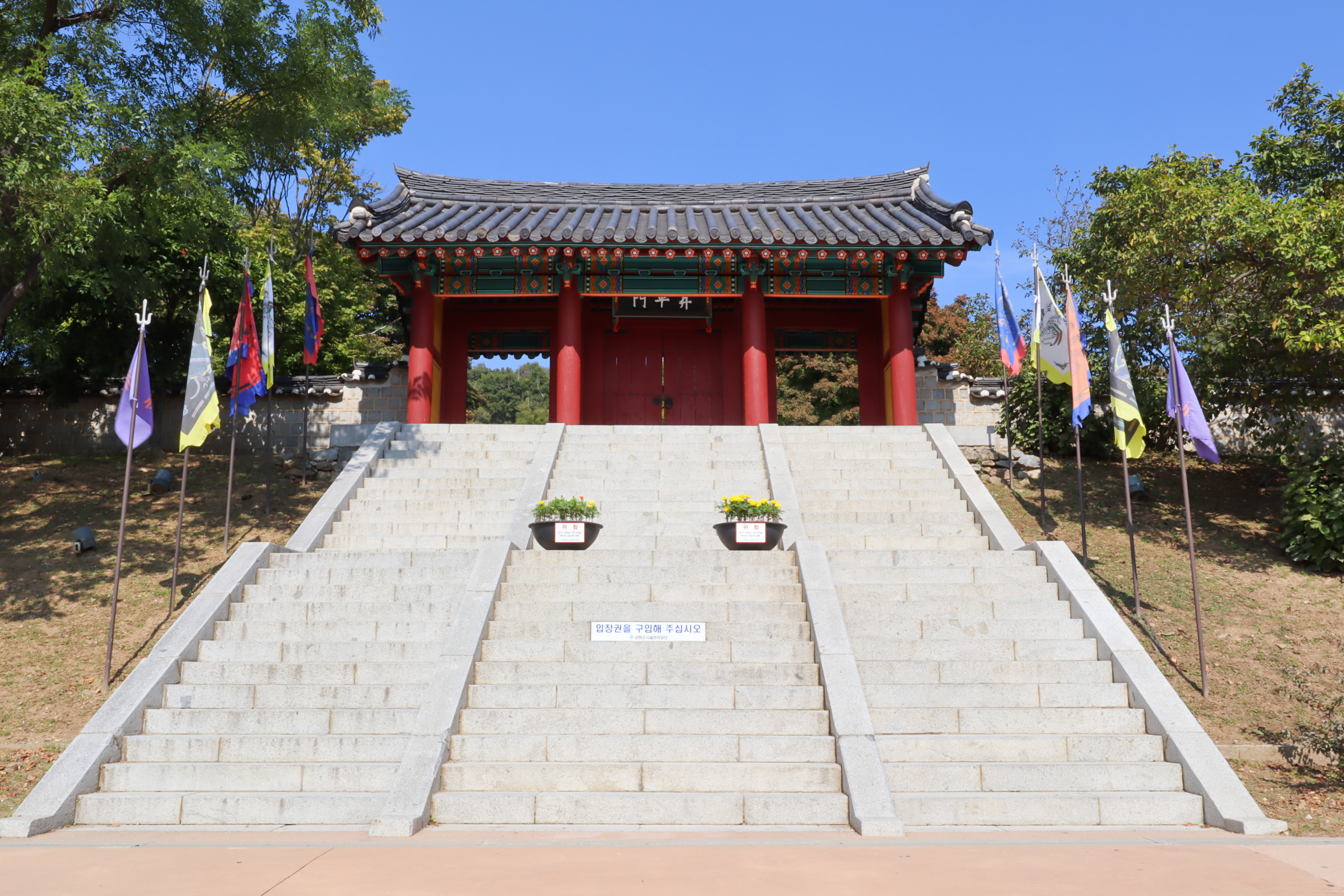
Goryeogung (2018)

Goryeogung is a palace site of Goryeo from 1232 to 1270 in Incheon.

Manisan is Ganghwa's tallest mountain and home to Chamseongdan Altar, where Dangun Wanggeom reportedly performed ancestral rites.

=== Festivals ===
- Goryeo Azalea Festival: Mid-April at Dolmen Square on Goryeo Mountain
- Ganghwa Salted Shrimp Festival: Early October at Oepo-ri dock
- Ganghwa Foundation Day Grand Festival: October 1–3 in Chamseongdan on Manisan
- Ganghwa Goryeo Ginseng Festival: Mid-October

=== Turnips ===
The island's turnip (Brassica rapa) has been cultivated for over 1,000 years. Its moisture content is over 90% and its main component is carbohydrate. The dark-purple, taproot vegetable has a mustardy scent and tastes like ginseng. Its seeds and the fully grown vegetable are used in folk remedies and Oriental medicine. Its leaves have vitamins, and its roots contain tryptophan and glycyrrhizin. Said to prevent cancer, the turnip helps cure skin diseases, digestive ailments, tuberculosis, and respiratory disease with an anti-bacterial effect.

== Notable people ==
- Ahn Hak-sop, former spy for North Korea, now political activist against American military presence in South Korea.
- CoreJJ, birth name Jo Yong-in, professional League of Legends player

== See also ==
- Geography of South Korea
