= Cyrus Hayden =

United States Navy Medal of Honor recipient

Cyrus Freeman Hayden
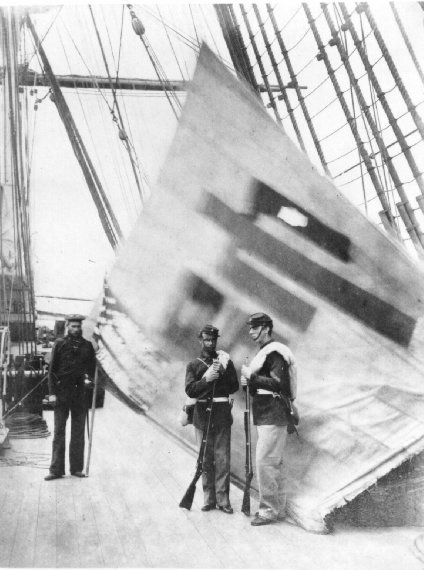
- aboard USS Colorado in 1871 (right to left) Cpl Charles Brown, Pvt Hugh Purvis, possibly Cyrus Hayden
- Born: September 1839; York, Maine, US
- Died: possibly February 25, 1912 (aged 72); Presque Isle, Maine, US
- Burial place: Fairmount Cemetery Section C, Lot 42
- Military career
- Allegiance: United States
- Branch: United States Navy
- Rank: Carpenter
- Unit: USS Colorado
- Conflicts: Korean Expedition
- Awards: Medal of Honor

Cyrus Freeman Hayden (September 1839 – possibly February 25, 1912) was a United States Navy sailor received the Medal of Honor for his actions during the Korean Expedition on June 11, 1871. While serving as the color bearer for the USS Colorado's crew and Marines, Hayden planted the American Flag on the ramparts under heavy enemy fire.

Hayden enlisted in the Navy from Boston, Massachusetts in 1869. While some list Hayden's death as occurring in 1912, there is no evidence "that the man buried in Maine was a veteran."

== Medal of Honor citation ==
Rank and organization: Carpenter, U.S. Navy. Born: 1843, York, Maine Accredited to: Maine. G.O. No.: 169, February 8, 1872.

Citation:

On board the USS Colorado during the attack and capture of the Korean forts, 11 June 1871. Serving as color bearer of the battalion, Hayden planted his flag on the ramparts of the citadel and protected it under a heavy fire from the enemy.

== See also ==
- List of Medal of Honor recipients
- General Orders and Circulars Issued by the Navy Department
