= USS Colorado (1856) =

Three-masted steam screw frigate of the United States Navy

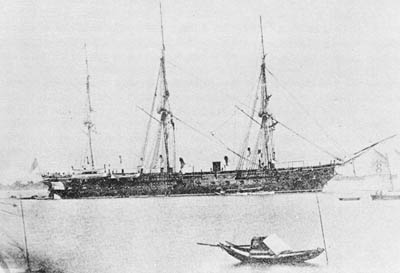
- USS Colorado

History

United States
- Name: Colorado
- Namesake: Colorado River
- Builder: Norfolk Navy Yard, Portsmouth, Virginia
- Laid down: 1856
- Launched: 19 June 1856
- Sponsored by: Miss N. S. Dornin
- Commissioned: 13 March 1858
- Decommissioned: 6 August 1858
- Recommissioned: 3 June 1861
- Decommissioned: 28 June 1862
- Recommissioned: 10 November 1862
- Decommissioned: 18 February 1864
- Recommissioned: 1 September 1864
- Decommissioned: 3 February 1865
- Recommissioned: 25 May 1865
- Decommissioned: 7 September 1867
- Recommissioned: 15 February 1870
- Decommissioned: 8 June 1876
- Fate: Sold 18 February 1885; Burned and sank August 1885

General characteristics
- Class & type: none
- Type: Screw frigate
- Displacement: 3,425 long tons (3,480 t)
- Length: 263 ft 8 in (80.37 m)
- Beam: 52 ft 6 in (16.00 m)
- Draft: 22 ft 1 in (6.73 m)
- Propulsion: Steam engine
- Sail plan: Three masts
- Speed: 9 kn (10 mph; 17 km/h)
- Complement: 674 officers and men
- Armament: 2 × 10 in (250 mm) guns; 28 × 9 in (230 mm) guns; 14 × 8 in (200 mm) guns

General characteristics 1864
- Class & type: none
- Armament: 1 × 150–pounder rifle; 1 × 11 in (280 mm) smoothbore guns; 46 × 9 in (230 mm) smoothbore guns; 4 × 12–pounder howitzers

General characteristics 1871
- Class & type: none
- Armament: 2 × 100–pounder rifles; 1 × 11 in (280 mm) smoothbore guns; 42 × 9 in (230 mm) smoothbore guns; 2 × 20–pounder howitzers; 6 × 12–pounder howitzers

The first USS Colorado, a 3,400-long-ton (3,500 t), three-masted steam screw frigate of the United States Navy in commission at various times between 1858 and 1876. She saw combat during the American Civil War (1861–1865) and the United States expedition to Korea in 1871. She was the fifth of the Franklin-class frigates — all of which except for Franklin were named after rivers in the United States — and was named after the Colorado River.

== Construction and commissioning ==
Colorado was launched on 19 June 1856, by the Norfolk Navy Yard in Portsmouth, Virginia, sponsored by Miss N. S. Dornin. Colorado was commissioned on 13 March 1858 with Captain W. H. Gardner in command.

== 1858–1860 ==
Putting to sea from the Boston Navy Yard in Boston, Massachusetts, on 12 May 1858, Colorado cruised in Cuban waters to deter the practice of search by British cruisers until 6 August 1858, when she returned to Boston and was placed in ordinary.

=== American Civil War ===
Colorado was recommissioned on 3 June 1861 for service in the American Civil War and got underway from Boston on 18 June 1861 to join the U.S. Navy's Gulf Blockading Squadron in the Union blockade of the Confederate States of America. She served as the flagship of the squadron commander, Commodore William Marvine. On 14 September 1861, an expedition from Colorado under Lieutenant J. H. Russell cut out the schooner Judah, believed to be preparing for service as a privateer, and spiked one gun of an artillery battery at the Pensacola Navy Yard in Pensacola, Florida, losing three men in the raid. On 11 December 1861, an expedition from Colorado captured a small schooner and two men at Pilottown, Louisiana. Colorado assisted in the capture of the steamer Calhoun (or Cuba) on 23 January 1862, off South West Pass, at the mouth of the Mississippi River, and on 30 January 1862 engaged four Confederate States Navy steamers.

In April 1862, Colorado was prevented from participating in the capture of New Orleans by her draft, which was too deep to cross the Mississippi River bar. However, nineteen of her guns and one of her howitzers were removed and distributed across the fleet for use in the fighting. She returned to Boston on 21 June 1862 and was decommissioned on 28 June 1862.

Recommissioned on 10 November 1862, Colorado departed Portsmouth Navy Yard in Kittery, Maine, on 9 December 1862 and rejoined the blockading force off Mobile, Alabama, on 13 March 1863. She shared in the capture of the schooner Hunter on 17 May 1863. Returning to Portsmouth Navy Yard on 4 February 1864, she again was placed out of commission on 18 February 1864.

Recommissioned on 1 September 1864, Colorado cleared Portsmouth Navy Yard on 6 October 1864. She joined the North Atlantic Blockading Squadron, with which she cruised off the coast of North Carolina until 26 January 1865.

Colorado participated in the bombardment and capture of Fort Fisher in the Second Battle of Fort Fisher from 13 to 15 January 1865. Being a wooden ship, she was placed in the line in a more protected position outside the line of monitors and other armored ships, but Confederate fire nonetheless struck her six times, killing one man and wounding two. Toward the end of the engagement, Rear Admiral David Dixon Porter signaled Commodore Henry Thatcher to close in and silence a certain part of the Confederate defensive works. As Colorado had already received considerable damage, her officers remonstrated, but Lieutenant George Dewey, displaying a marked tactical ability, quickly saw the advantage to be gained by the move and under his orders the Confederate work was taken in 15 minutes. The New York Times, commenting upon this part of the action, spoke of it as "the most beautiful duel of the war." Porter came to congratulate Thatcher, Thatcher said generously: "You must thank Lieutenant Dewey, sir. It was his move." Dewey was promoted to lieutenant commander. In 1898, as a commodore, he achieved fame in command of the U.S. Navy's Asiatic Squadron in the Battle of Manila Bay during the Spanish-American War.

On 3 February 1865, Colorado was placed out of commission at the New York Navy Yard in Brooklyn, New York. She was there when the American Civil War ended in April 1865.

== Post-Civil War ==
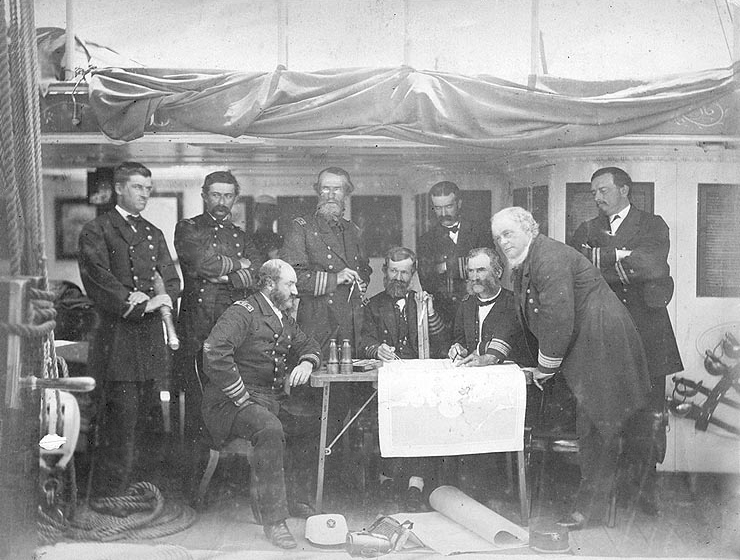
A posed photograph of U.S. Navy officers holding a council of war aboard Colorado off Korea, in June 1871, prior to the Korean Expedition. The ship's commanding officer, Captain George H. Cooper, is seated at center, and the Asiatic Squadron's commander, Rear Admiral John Rodgers, leans over the table at right.

=== European Squadron ===
On 25 May 1865, Colorado was recommissioned at the New York Navy Yard. Ordered to the European Squadron as flagship, she got underway on 11 June 1865 and cruised off England, Portugal, and Spain and in the Mediterranean and Adriatic Seas until she departed Cherbourg, France, on 23 July 1867 bound for the New York Navy Yard, where she was placed in ordinary on 7 September 1867. While she was in ordinary, Lieutenant Commander Dewey served another tour of duty aboard her from 1867 to 1868 as her executive officer.

=== Asiatic Squadron ===
Colorado returned to active service on 15 February 1870 and joined the Asiatic Squadron on 9 April 1870, becoming the flagship of the squadron commander, Rear Admiral John Rodgers. The squadron operated in support of an American goal of rivaling France, the Russian Empire, and the United Kingdom in their efforts to establish trade and spheres of influence in China, Japan, and Korea. She carried the U.S. minister to China and Korea on a diplomatic mission in April 1871.

On 1 June 1871, shore batteries from two Korean forts on the Salee River made an unprovoked attack on two Asiatic Squadron ships. When the Koreans offered no explanation for the attack, the Asiatic Squadron mounted an operation — a punitive expedition known in Korean as the Sinmiyangyo — that destroyed the forts in the Battle of Ganghwa and inflicted heavy casualties on the Koreans.

Clearing Hong Kong on 21 November 1872, Colorado proceeded by way of Singapore and Cape Town to the New York Navy Yard, where she arrived on 11 March 1873.

=== North Atlantic Squadron ===
Colorado departed from New York on 12 December 1873 to operate with the North Atlantic Squadron. She became flagship of the squadron on 27 August 1874. She returned to New York on 30 May 1876.

== Decommissioning and disposal ==
Colorado was placed out of commission on 8 June 1876. From 1876 to 1884, she served as a receiving ship at the New York Navy Yard. She was sold to a private company on 14 February 1885 so that she could be burned for her copper fastenings and scrapped. While Colorado was being broken up off Plum Beach near Port Washington, Long Island, New York, a fire broke out on the evening of 21 August 1885 on her forward deck, where salvors were burning boards to recover iron spikes from them. The fire spread from Colorado to several other former U.S. Navy ships — the decommissioned steam frigates Ammonoosuc and Susquehanna, screw sloop Congress, and unidentified ships described by the press as "Minnesota" and "South Carolina" — and the ships Fairplay and Lotta Grant, all of which were undergoing or awaiting scrapping nearby. Colorado and the other ships burned to the waterline and sank. The company that had been breaking the ships up, Stannard & Co., claimed at the time that the fire may have caused a loss of more than US$100,000.

== See also ==
- List of steam frigates of the United States Navy
- Bibliography of early American naval history
- Union Navy
