= List of Boeing B-17 Flying Fortress variants =

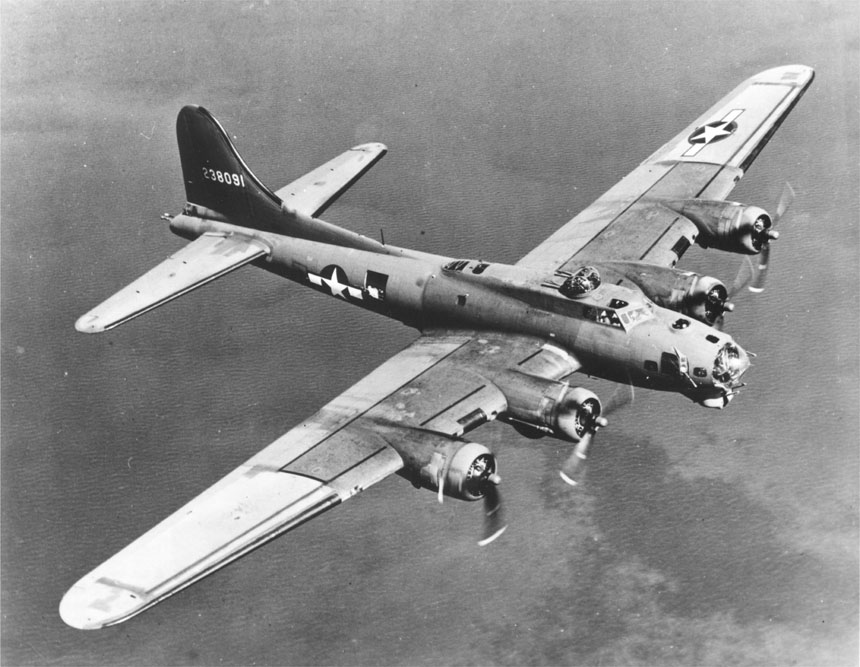
Boeing B-17G Flying Fortress

The following is an extensive catalogue of the variants and specific unique elements of each variant and/or design stage of the Boeing B-17 Flying Fortress, a heavy bomber used by the United States Army Air Forces and other Allied air forces during World War II.

== Boeing Model 299 (B-17) ==
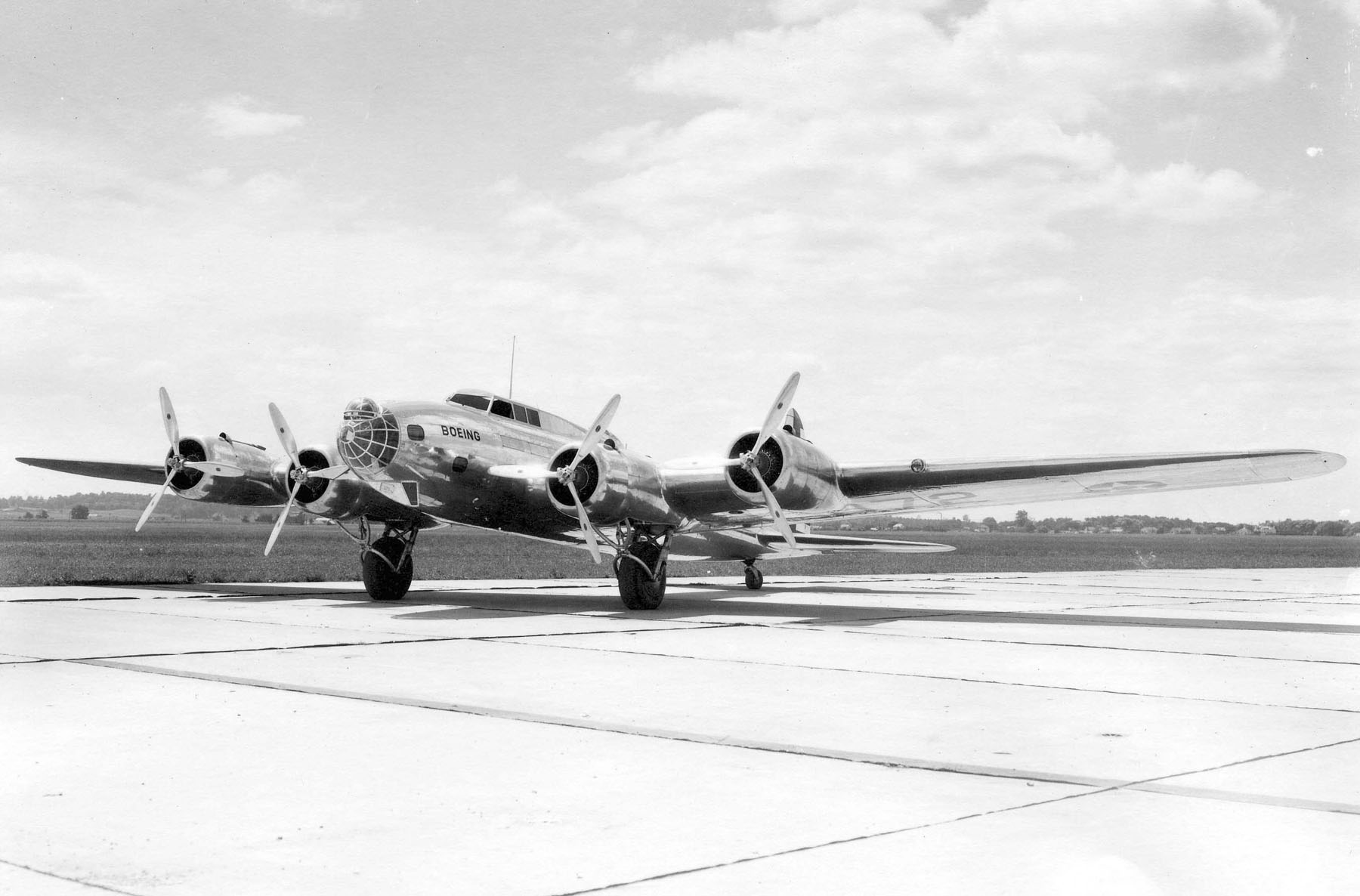
Model 299 in 1935

The Model 299 was the original aircraft built by Boeing to fulfill an August 1934 requirement by the United States Army Air Corps for a bomber capable of carrying 2,000 lb (910 kg) of bombs 2,000 mi (3,200 km) at 200 mph (320 km/h). The 299 was powered by four 750 hp (560 kW) Pratt & Whitney S1EG Hornet radial engines, giving a maximum speed of 236 mph (380 km/h) and a maximum gross weight of 38,053 lb (17,261 kg). It carried a bomb load of up to eight 600 lb (270 kg) bombs, with a defensive armament of five .30 in (7.6 mm) machine guns, with one in a nose turret and one each in dorsal and ventral mounts and two in waist blisters. In 1935, Boeing's Model 299 competed with entries from other aircraft companies at an evaluation at Wright Field near Dayton, Ohio, USA.

On its flight from Seattle, Washington to Wright Field for the competition, the 299 set a nonstop speed record of 252 mph (406 km/h). Though it crashed and burned on takeoff during a demonstration, the crash was due to flight-crew error, when unreleased gust locks prevented flight surfaces from moving, not from any technical flaw in the aircraft. Subsequently, a mandatory pre-flight checklist prior to take-off was required. Despite the crash and its much higher unit cost, the Army Air Corps leaders was impressed by its performance, so Boeing was awarded a development contract. The aircraft has since been referred to as the XB-17, but this designation was not contemporary or official.

== Y1B-17 (YB-17) ==
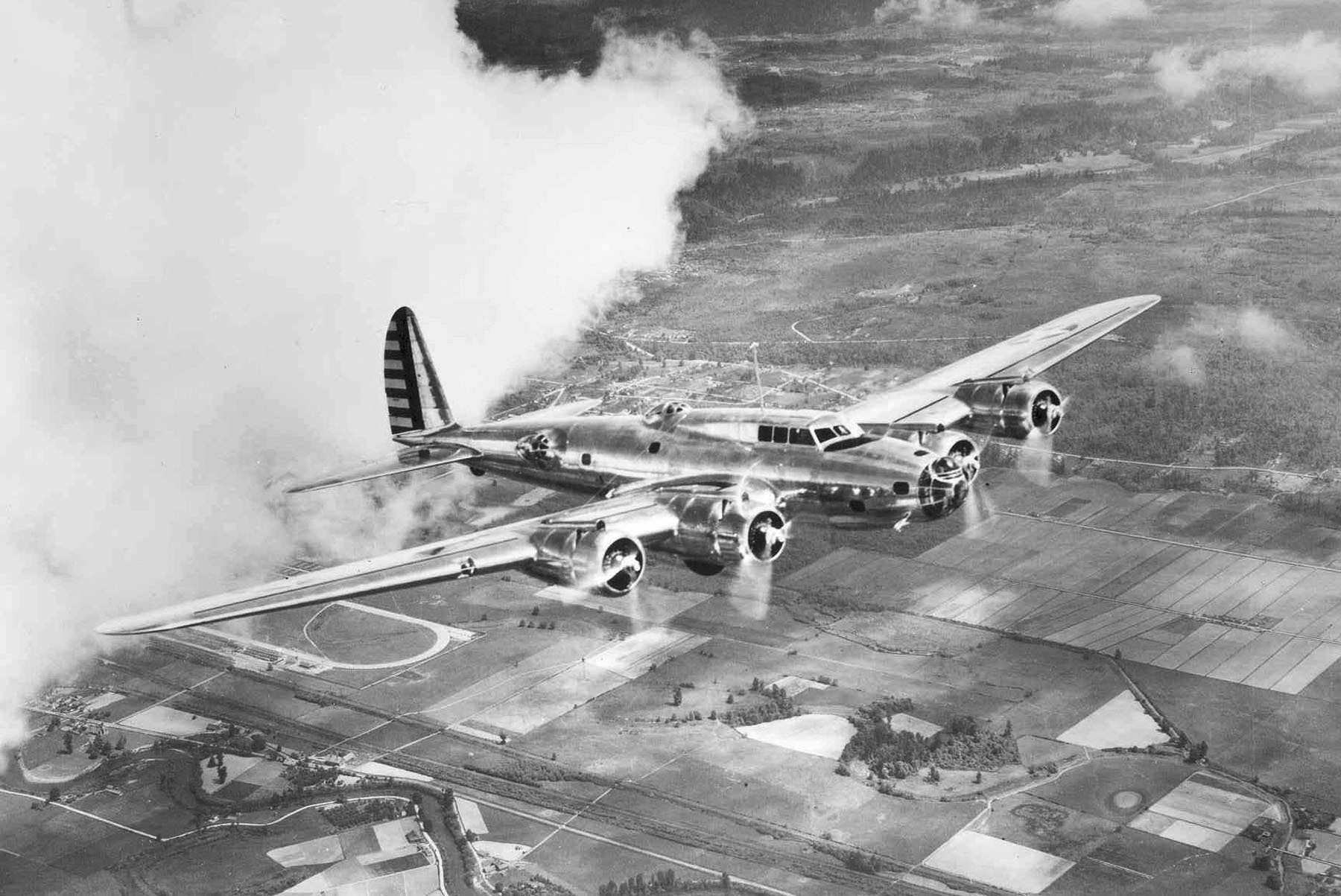
Boeing Y1B-17 in flight

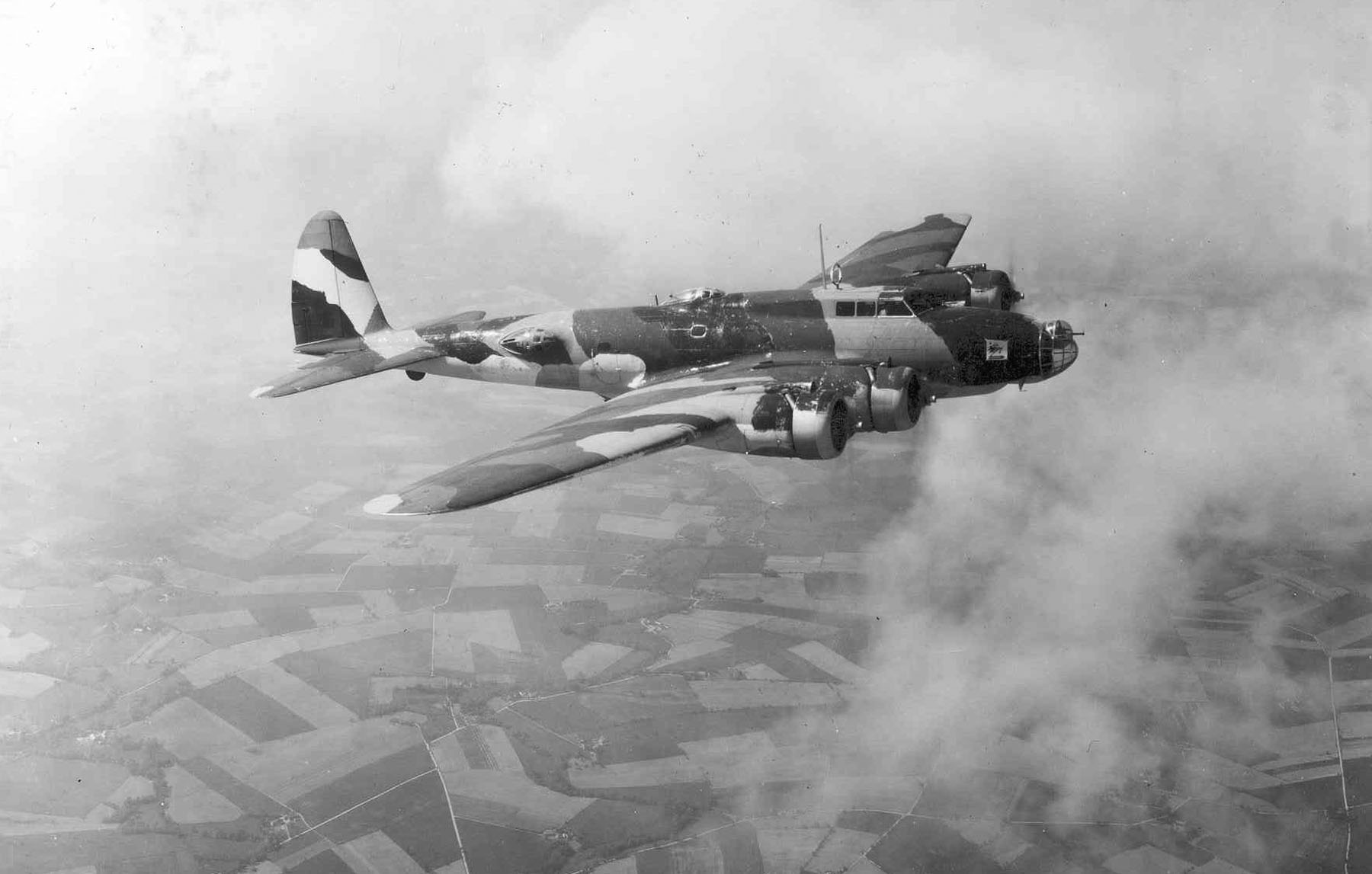
Boeing Y1B-17 of the 20th Bomb Squadron, 2nd Bomb Group, based at Langley Field, Virginia, in temporary war game camouflage

Though still enthusiastic about the Boeing design, despite it being disqualified from the fly-off contest following the crash of the Model 299 prototype, the Army Air Corps cut its order from 65 service test YB-17s to just 13. On November 20, 1936, the bomber's normal acquisition funding was changed to "F-1", indicating funding outside of normal annual allocations, and the heavy YB-17 bomber was redesignated "Y1B-17", as a result.

Unlike the first example, which had used Pratt & Whitney R-1690 Hornet radial engines, the Y1B-17 used the more powerful Wright R-1820 Cyclone that would be the standard power plant for all subsequent B-17s. Changes were also made in the armament, and the crew was reduced from seven to six. Most changes were minor: the most notable was switching from double-wishbone to single-arm landing gear for ease of maintenance.

On 7 December 1936, five days after the first flight of the Y1B-17, the brakes fused during landing, and it nosed over. Though damage was minimal, the cumulative impact of this event, combined with the crash of the Model 299, triggered a Congressional investigation. Following the crash, the Army Air Corps was put on notice and another crash would mean the end of the bomber's "F-1" procurement program.

The commander of Army General Headquarters (Air Force), Major General Frank Andrews, assigned twelve Y1B-17s to the 2nd Bomb Group located at Langley Field, Virginia to develop heavy bombing techniques. Of the thirteen Boeing aircraft built, one was assigned for stress testing. Most of the time spent with the bombers entailed eliminating problems with the aircraft but the most important development was the use of a detailed checklist reviewed by the pilot and copilot prior to each takeoff. It was hoped that this procedure would prevent further accidents.

In May 1938, the Y1B-17s (now redesignated as B-17) of the 2nd Bombardment Group, led by the lead bombers' navigator Curtis LeMay, took part in a demonstration in which they intercepted the Italian liner Rex. Coming into contact with the liner while it was still 610 mi (980 km) out at sea, the demonstration was meant to prove the range and capabilities of the B-17. It also showed that the bomber could attack a naval invasion force before it could reach land. The Navy was furious about the Army's intrusion into their mission, and forced the War Department to issue an order restricting the Army Air Corps from operating more than a hundred miles from America's coastline.

After three years of flight, no serious incidents occurred with the B-17s. In October 1940, they were transferred to the 19th Bombardment Group at March Field.

== B-17A (Y1B-17A) ==
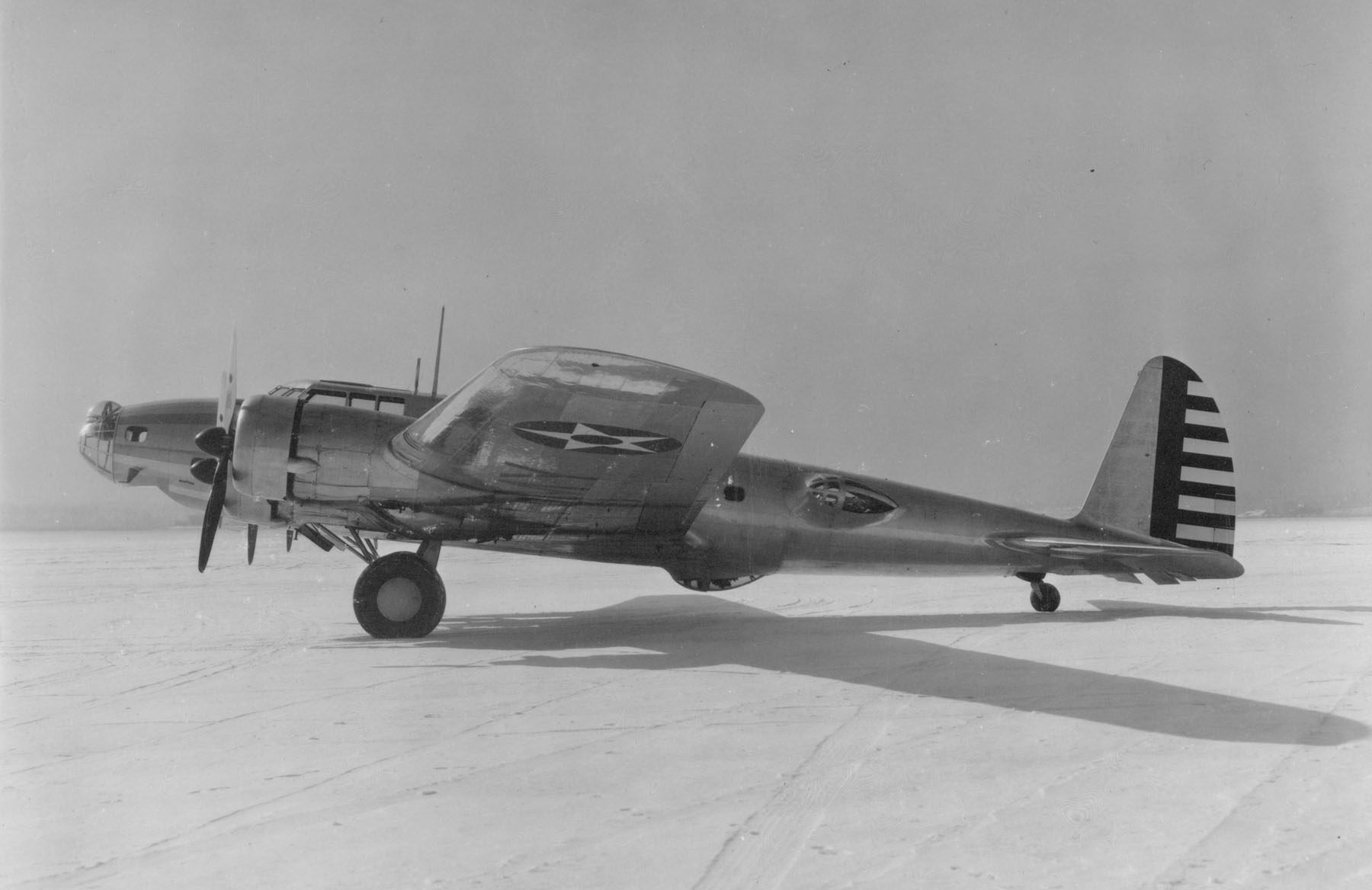
Boeing Y1B-17A

The aircraft that became the sole Y1B-17A was originally ordered as a static test bed. However, when one of the Y1B-17s survived an inadvertent violent spin during a flight in a thunderhead, Army Air Corps leaders decided that there would be no need for static testing. Instead, it was used as a testbed for improving engine performance. After studying a variety of configurations, use of a ventral-nacelle-mount turbocharger was chosen for each of its four engines. A successive series of General Electric-manufactured turbochargers would equip B-17s as standard items, starting with the first production model, allowing it to fly higher and faster than the Y1B-17. When testing was completed, the Y1B-17A was reconfigured as a B-17A.

== B-17B ==
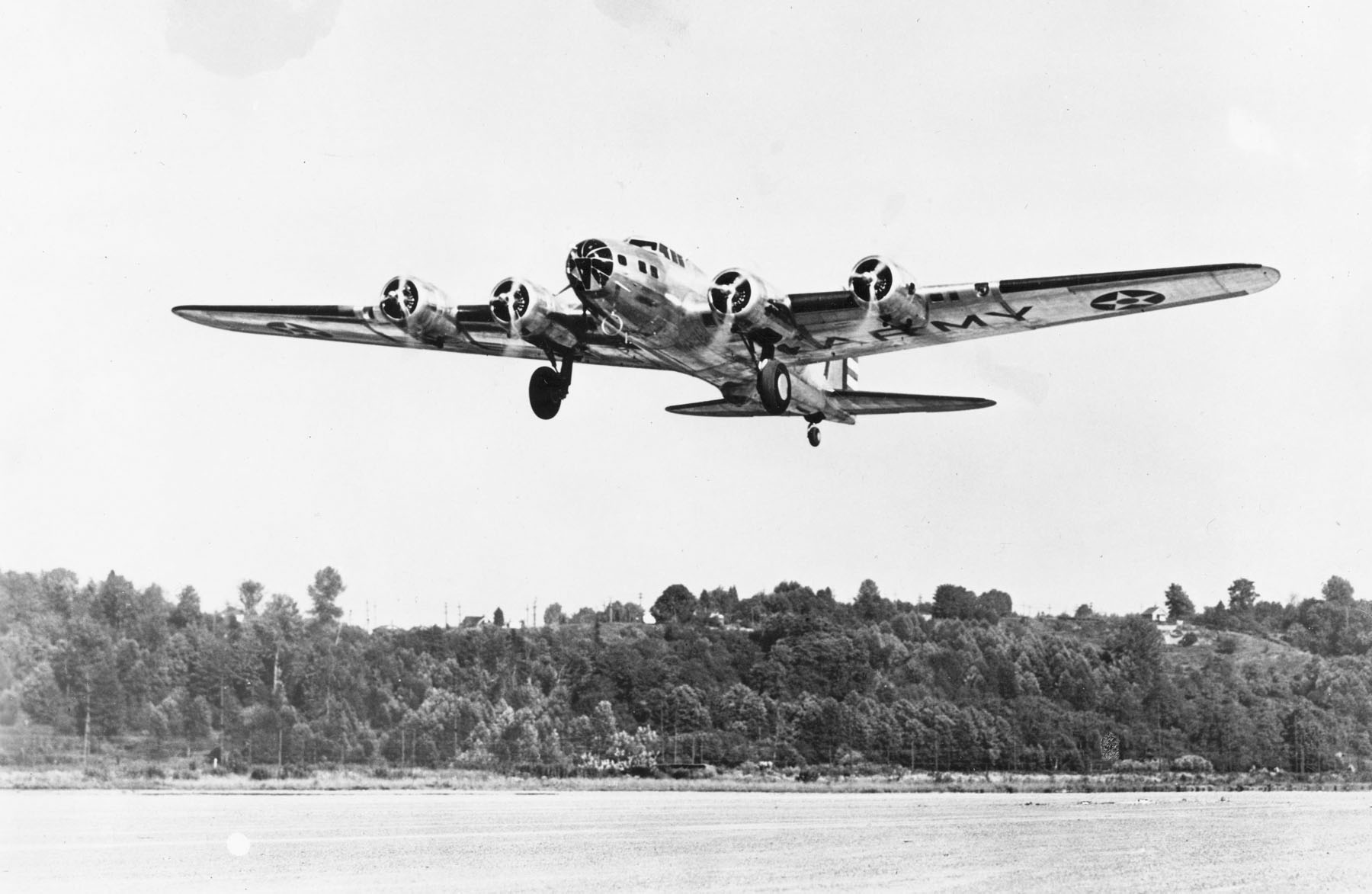
B-17B just after takeoff

RB-17B in the film Air Force

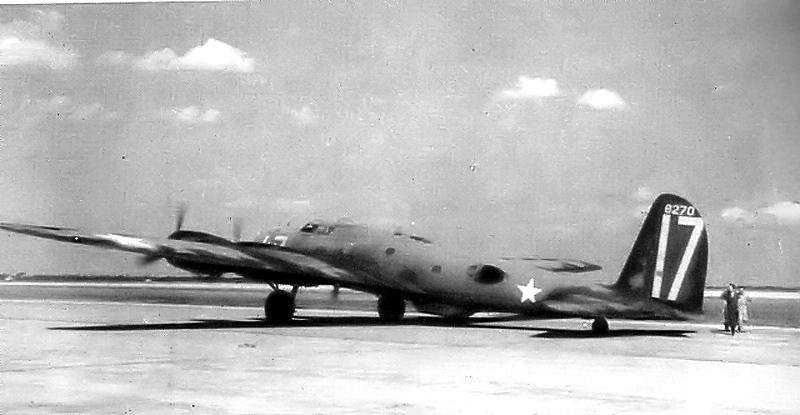
B-17B Flying Fortress 38-270

The B-17B (299M) was the first production model of the B-17 and was essentially a B-17A with a slightly larger rudder, larger flaps, a redesigned nose and 1,200 hp (890 kW) R-1820-51 engines. The small, globe-like, machine gun turret used in the Y1B-17's upper nose blister was replaced with a .30 in (7.62 mm) machine gun, its barrel run through a ball-socket in the heavily framed Perspex nose glazing. The Y1B-17's separate triangular-shaped bombardier's aiming window, located further back in the lower nose in an indent, was eliminated, and was replaced with a framed window panel in the lower portion of the nose glazing. All B-17B aircraft were later modified at Boeing, being brought up to the B-17C/D production standard. While the new nose glazing still used only a single .30 in (7.62 mm) caliber machine gun, two additional ball-sockets were installed in the nose, one in the upper left panel and another in a lower right. This configuration was continued up through the B-17E series. During Army Air Corps service, the bulged teardrop-shaped machine gun blisters were replaced with flush-mounted Perspex side windows of the same type used in the B-17C/D series. Various aircraft had different levels of upgrades performed. Some of the "B" series Fortresses had only their bulged side blisters replaced with slide-out flush windows, while others also had their bulged upper blister changed to a much flatter, more aerodynamic Perspex window panel. In addition, some "B" series Fortresses also had ventral "bathtub turrets" (see the "C/D" section below) installed, replacing their lower, teardrop-shaped gun blisters.

Crew locations were rearranged, and the original pneumatic brakes were replaced with hydraulic brakes.

In October 1942 all in-service B-17B aircraft were redesignated RB-17B, the "R" indicating "Restricted" and these aircraft were now used only for training and transport duties. The "R" prefix designated combat obsolescence.

Many of these RB-17B aircraft, along with at least one still-airworthy YB-17, were stationed at Sebring Airfield, where the exterior scenes were filmed for the Warner Bros. war drama Air Force (1943), directed by Howard Hawks, and starring (among others) John Garfield, Arthur Kennedy, Gig Young, and Harry Carey. The film's real star, however, was an RB-17B. It passed as a later model B-17D Flying Fortress, having had its machine gun blisters replaced and a lower "bathtub" ventral gun turret installed. Many of these aircraft can be seen in both ground and aerial scenes during the film.

The "B" series Flying Fortress first flew on 27 June 1939. Thirty nine were built in a single production run, but Army Air Corps serial numbers were scattered over several batches. This was because of limited government funding: The Army Air Corps could only afford to purchase a few B-17Bs at a time.

== B-17C ==
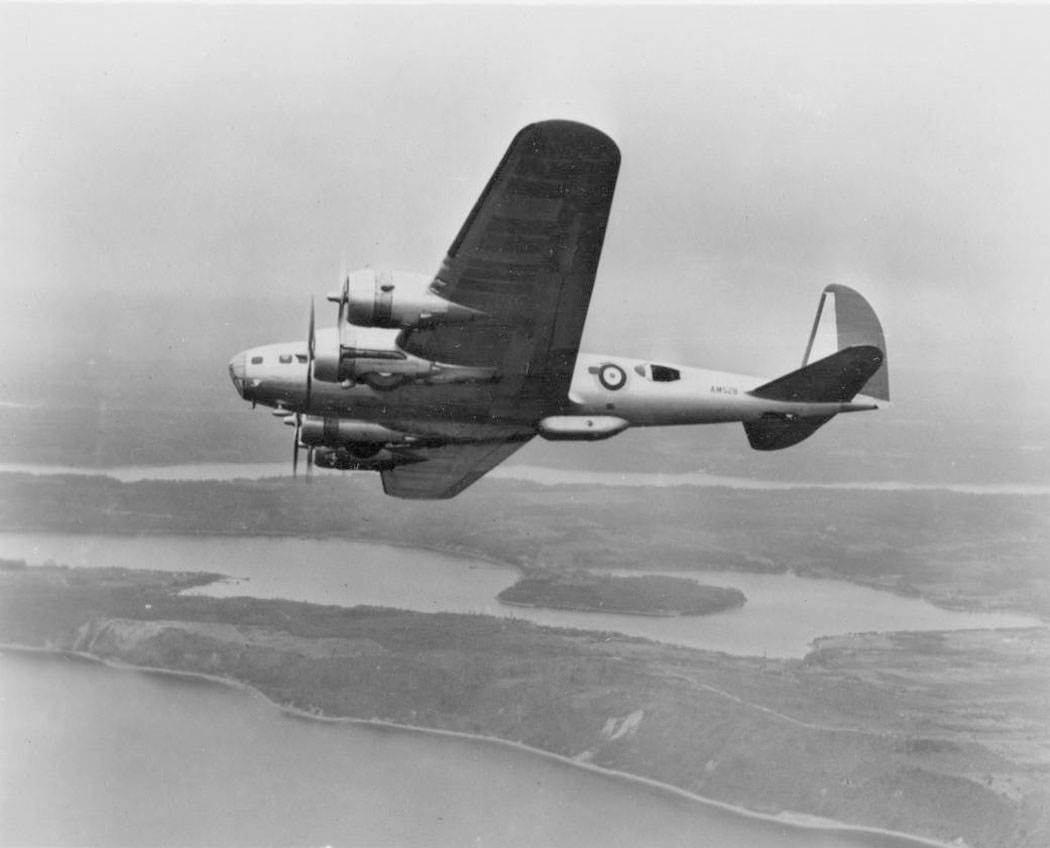
Boeing B-17C, Fortress I, in RAF markings

The B-17C introduced a number of improvements over the B-17B, including more powerful Wright R-1820-65 engines. To improve crew safety, the waist-mounted machine gun blisters were replaced with teardrop-shaped, slide-out Perspex window panels flush with the fuselage, and the ventral blister was replaced by a lower metal gondola housing dubbed a "bathtub turret". The most important additions made to the "C" series were self-sealing fuel tanks and armor plate.

The first of the B-17C series flew in July 1940, with 38 being built. The 18 remaining in Army Air Forces service, after 20 had been transferred to the RAF, were upgraded to the B-17D configuration, although one of these crashed on a ferry flight in the US.

=== Fortress Mk.I ===
With the passage of the Lend-lease Act in 1941, the Royal Air Force requested B-17s. At that time, the US Army Air Corps was suffering from shortages, but supplied 20 to the RAF. Though the Air Corps hadn't cleared the B-17 for combat, they were desperately needed in Britain. The 20 ferried bombers were production B-17Cs (company designation Model 299T), designated Fortress Mk I by the RAF. The aircraft's single .30 caliber nose-mounted machine guns were replaced with .50 caliber Brownings.

Following delivery, the 20 Fortress Mk.Is went almost immediately into frontline service, however they performed poorly. By September 1941, 39 sorties had only resulted in 22 missions, with nearly half of the sorties aborted due to mechanical and electrical problems. Eight of the 20 aircraft had been destroyed by September, half to accidents. Their guns froze-up at altitude and were unable to protect the Fortresses from attack and their effectiveness as bombers was also limited, largely because of problems with achieving an adequate level of bombing accuracy.

== B-17D ==
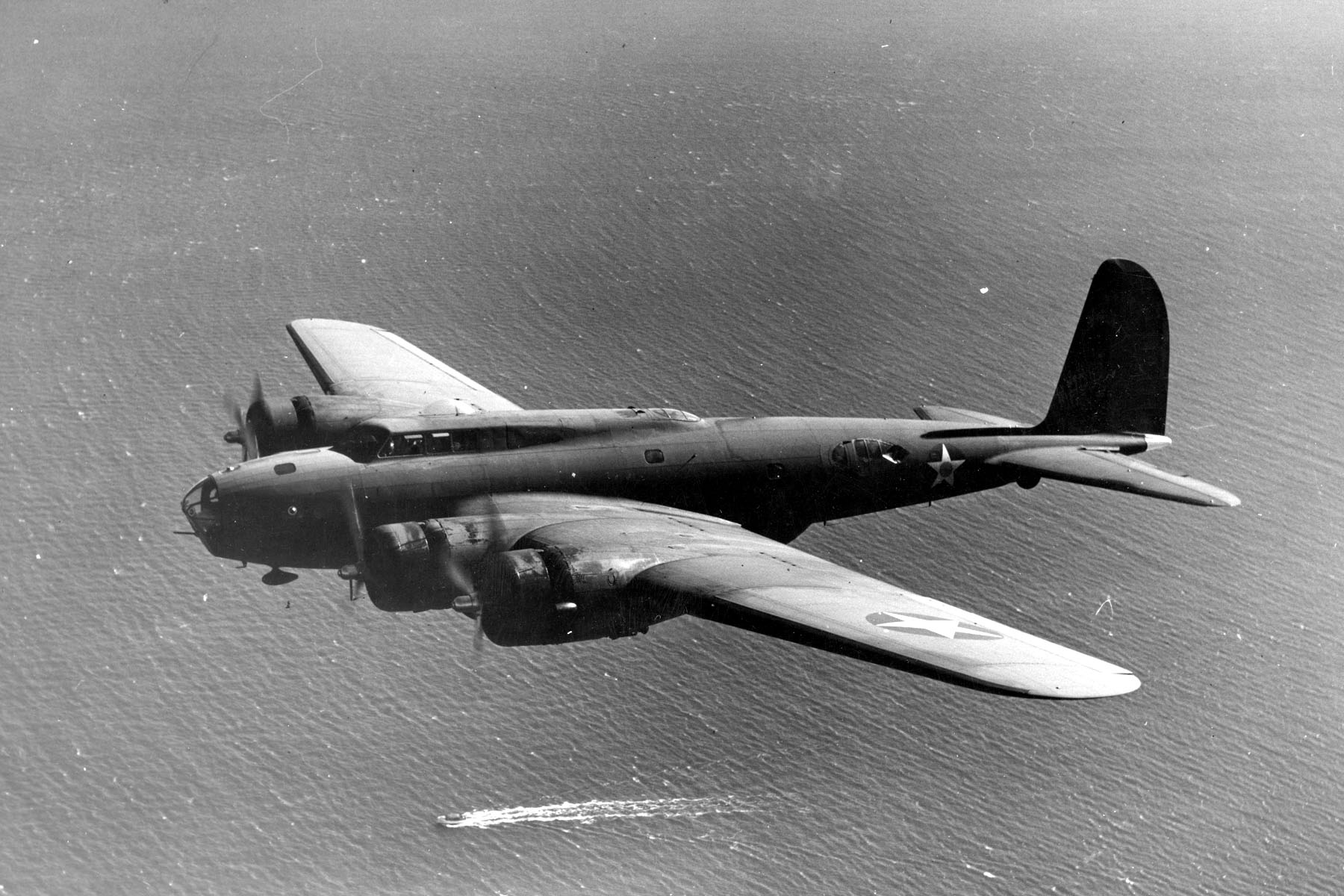
B-17D in flight

Though changes in the design made the Army Air Force decide that the B-17D was worthy of a new sub designation, the B-17C and B-17D were very similar. In fact, both were given the same sub designation (299H) by Boeing.

Minor changes were made, both internally and externally. Outside, the engines received a set of adjustable cowl flaps for improved cooling, and the externally-mounted bomb racks were removed. On the interior, the electrical system was revised, and another crew position was added, bringing the total number to ten. In the aft-dorsal radio compartment was a new overhead twin-.50s machine gun mount; in the central-aft section's ventral "bathtub" gun position, twin .50s were also added, as was additional armor plating. Nose gun ball sockets were added to the side windows for the first time, in a longitudinally staggered layout (the starboard ball socket was further forward than the port-side ball socket). The number of machine guns aboard brought the total armament to seven: one portable nose .30 in (7.62 mm) and six .50 in (12.70 mm). The B-17D also featured more extensive armored plate protection. A total of 42 "D" series were built, and the 18 remaining B-17Cs were converted to Boeing's new B-17D standard. The sole-surviving example of the "D" series (originally built in 1940 and nicknamed Ole Betsy by her original aircrew) is currently undergoing restoration at the National Museum of the United States Air Force in Dayton, Ohio. This B-17D was later renamed "The Swoose" by her last pilot Col. Frank Kurtz, who after the war, kept the Fortress from being scrapped; he later named his daughter, actress Swoosie Kurtz, after the bomber.

== B-17E ==
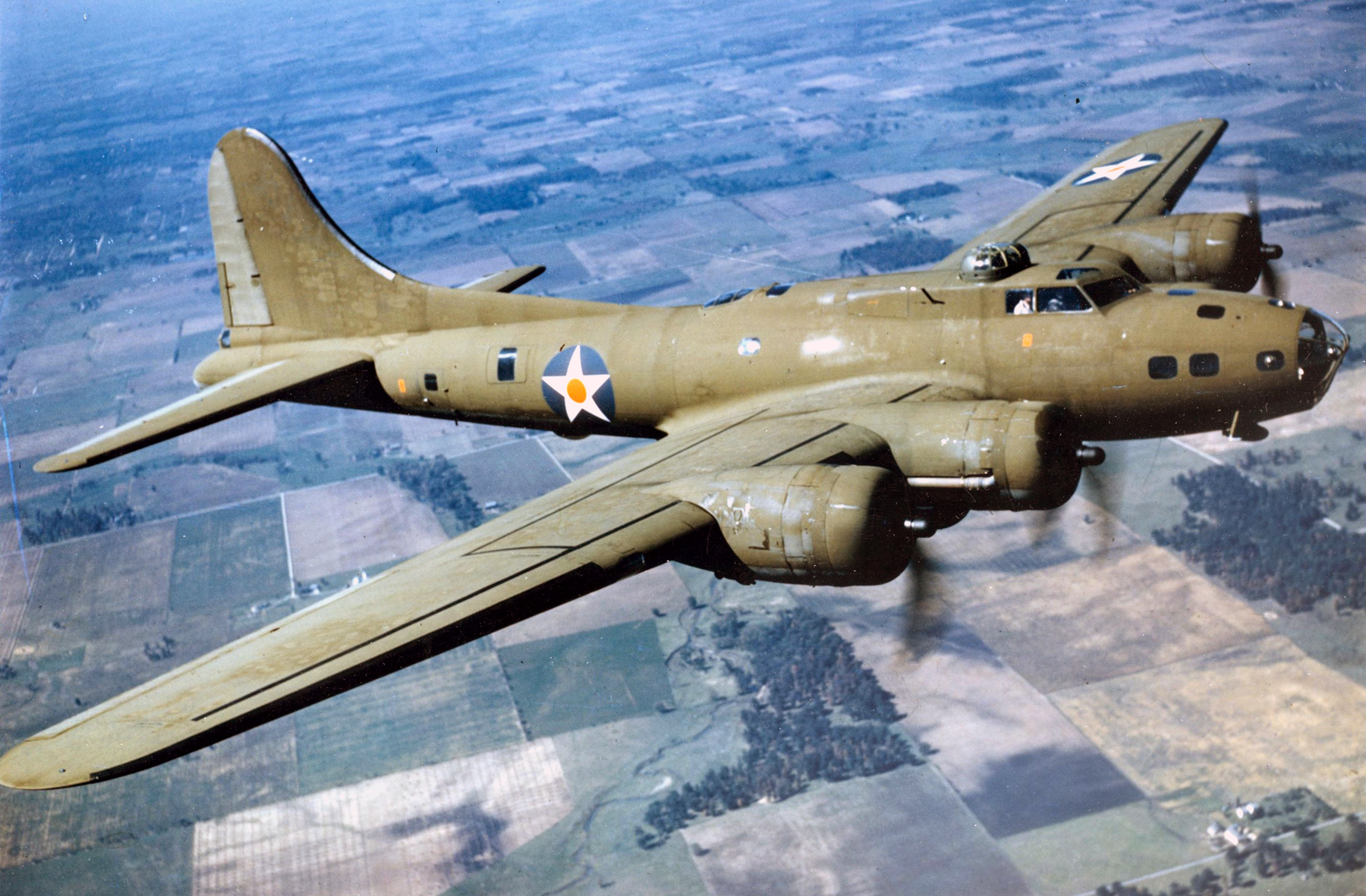
B-17E circa 1942

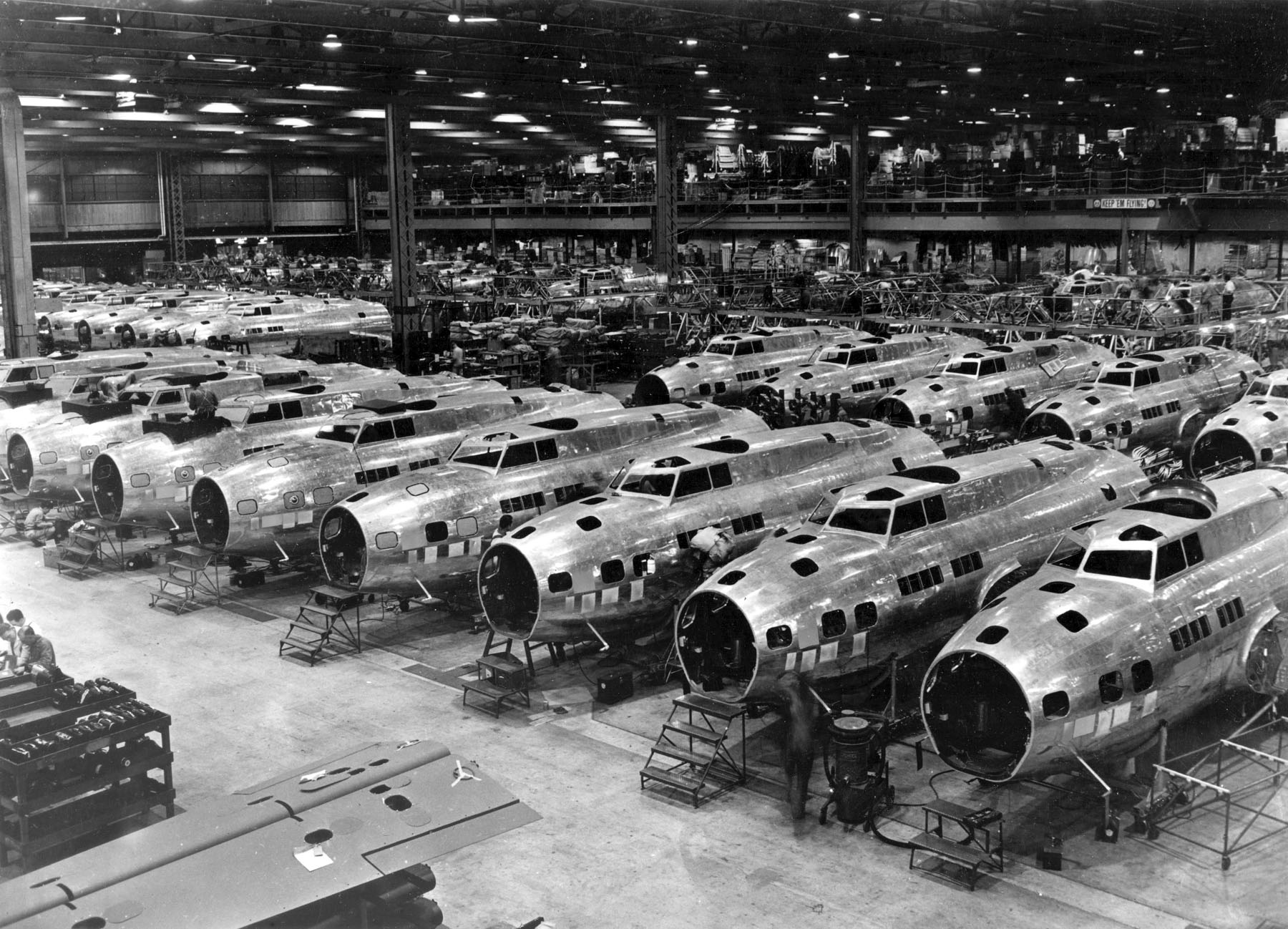
Boeing B-17Es under construction. This is the first released wartime production photograph of B-17s at one of the Boeing plants in Seattle.

The B-17E (299O) was an extensive redesign of the previous B-17D. The most obvious change was the larger, completely new vertical stabilizer, originally developed for the Boeing 307 Stratoliner, and the addition of a tail gunner. Experience had shown the Flying Fortress was vulnerable to attack from behind. The redesign added a tail gunner's position and a powered, dorsal turret located just behind the cockpit. Each of these positions was armed with a pair of Browning AN/M2 .50 cal. machine guns. Until these modifications, specific maneuvers were needed against attacks from behind, including yawing the bomber laterally, allowing the waist gunners to alternate bursts at enemy fighters. For better visibility the waist gunner teardrop sliding panels were replaced by rectangular windows. In the first production run, the ventral gunner's "bathtub" from the B-17D was replaced by a remotely-sighted Bendix turret. It was similar to the one used in the B-25B through -D Mitchell bombers, but was difficult to use and was a failure in combat. This resulted in remaining B-17E (and following F and G) aircraft being fitted with a manned Sperry ball turret.

As many as 512 were built based on the USAAC's July 1940 order for B-17s.

Four examples of B-17Es still exist in museums, none of which are currently known to be airworthy.

=== Fortress Mk.IIA ===
In the middle of 1942, 45 B-17Es were transferred to the RAF, where they served under the designation Fortress Mk.IIA. Because of the shortcomings experienced with the Mk.I, the RAF did not use the Mk.IIA in its intended role but instead they were operated by the Coastal Command for anti-submarine patrols.

== B-17F ==
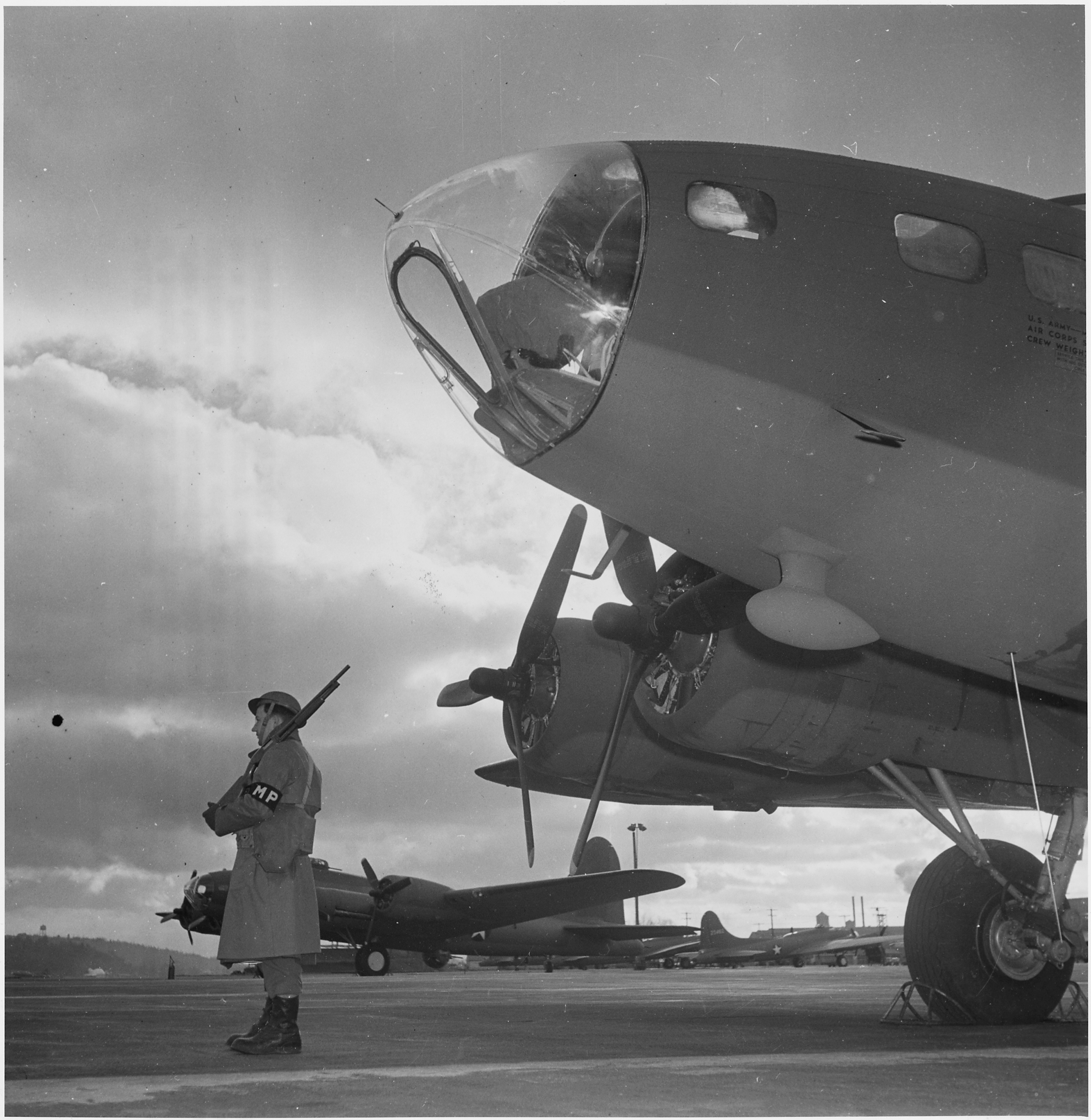
New B-17Fs from Seattle. Note the transparent seam of the two-piece Plexiglas bombardier's nose glazing.

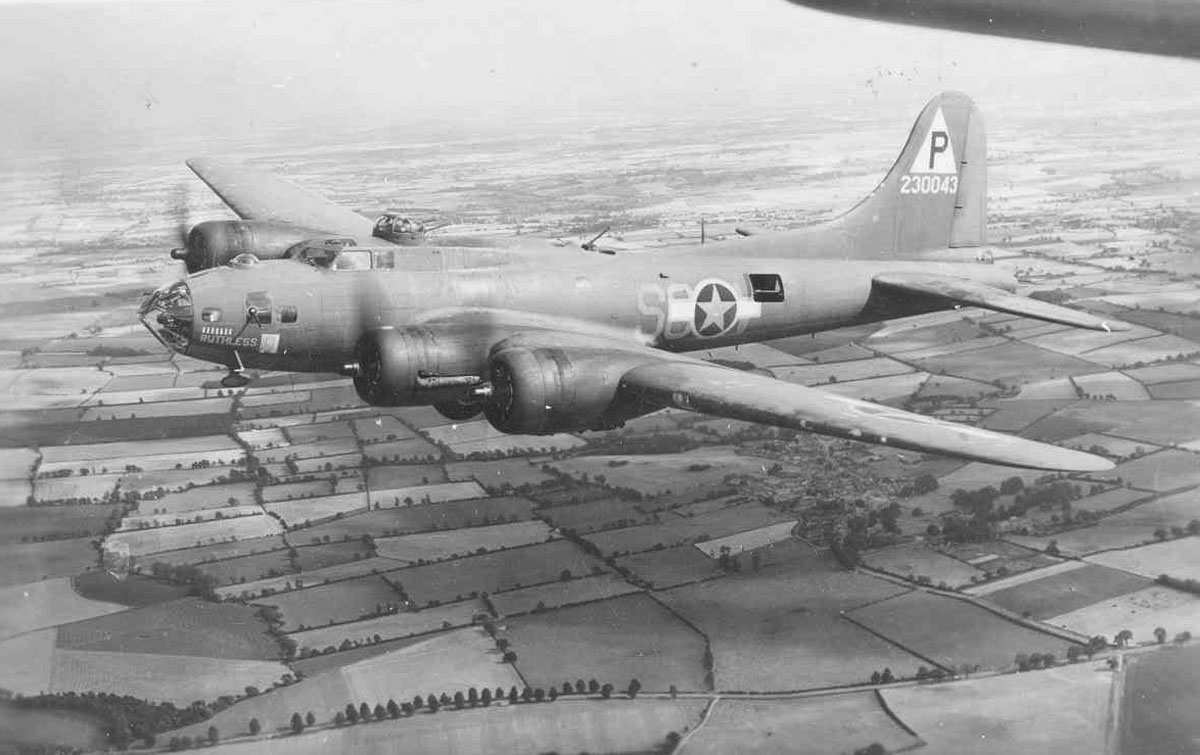
Boeing B-17F (S/N 42-30043) 'Ruthless' of the 384th Bomb Group, 547th Bomb Squadron

The B-17F was an upgrade of the B-17E. Outwardly, both types were distinguished primarily by the extensively framed nose glazing on the "E" series being replaced with a molded, one-piece or two-piece all plexiglas nose cone on the "F" series and later. Fully-feathering paddle-blade propellers were also adopted. Many internal changes were also made to improve the effectiveness, range, and load capacity. Once placed in combat service, however, the "F" series was found to be tail-heavy. The combined weight, when fully combat-loaded, of the four rear gunners and their heavy .50 caliber ammunition, moved the bomber's center of gravity rearward. This forced the constant use of the bomber's elevator trim tab, stressing that component to eventual failure. In combat the B-17F also proved almost immediately to have inadequate defensive protection when being attacked directly from the front. Various armament configurations of two-to-four flexible machine guns were added to the plexiglass nose cone and side window positions (the starboard position was placed further forward). Late production "F" series aircraft received substantially-enlarged bulged "cheek" mounts for their .50 caliber machine guns, on each side of the nose. These replaced the previous side window-mounted .50s. These "cheek" mounts allowed for firing more directly ahead. An overhead astrodome was also added for the navigator on top of the nose.

The problem of head-on defense was not adequately addressed until the introduction of a powered, Bendix-designed, remotely operated "chin" turret in the final production blocks of F-series Fortresses, starting with the last 65 (86 according to some sources) B-17Fs built by Douglas, from the B-17F-70-DL production block (Note: Most sources say that the turret was introduced on the B-17F-75-DL, but photographs indicate that the F-70-DL also had the turret.) — directly derived from its debut on the YB-40 experimental "gunship" version.

With reinforced landing gear, the maximum bomb capacity increased from 4,200 lb (1,900 kg) to 8,000 lb (3,600 kg). Though this modification reduced cruising speed by 70 mph (110 km/h), increased bomb-carrying capacity was favored over speed. A number of other modifications were made, including reinstalling external bomb racks, but because both rate-of-climb and high-altitude flight performance suffered, these were rarely used and were removed.

Range and combat radius were extended with the installation in mid-production of additional fuel cells in the wings. Called "Tokyo tanks", nine self-sealing rubber-composition fuel tanks were mounted inside each wing on each side of the reinforcing joint between the inner and outer wing spars. With an extra 1,080 US gal (4,100 L; 900 imp gal) to the 1,700 US gal (6,400 L; 1,400 imp gal) available on the first B-17Fs, the "Tokyo tanks" added approximately 900 mi (1,400 km) to the bomber's target capability.

3,405 "F" series Flying Fortresses were built: 2,300 by Boeing, 605 by Douglas, and 500 by Lockheed (Vega). This includes the famous Memphis Belle.

Three examples of the B-17F remain in existence, including the restored Memphis Belle.

=== Fortress Mk.II ===
19 B-17Fs were transferred to the RAF, where they served with RAF Coastal Command as the Fortress Mk.II.

== B-17G ==
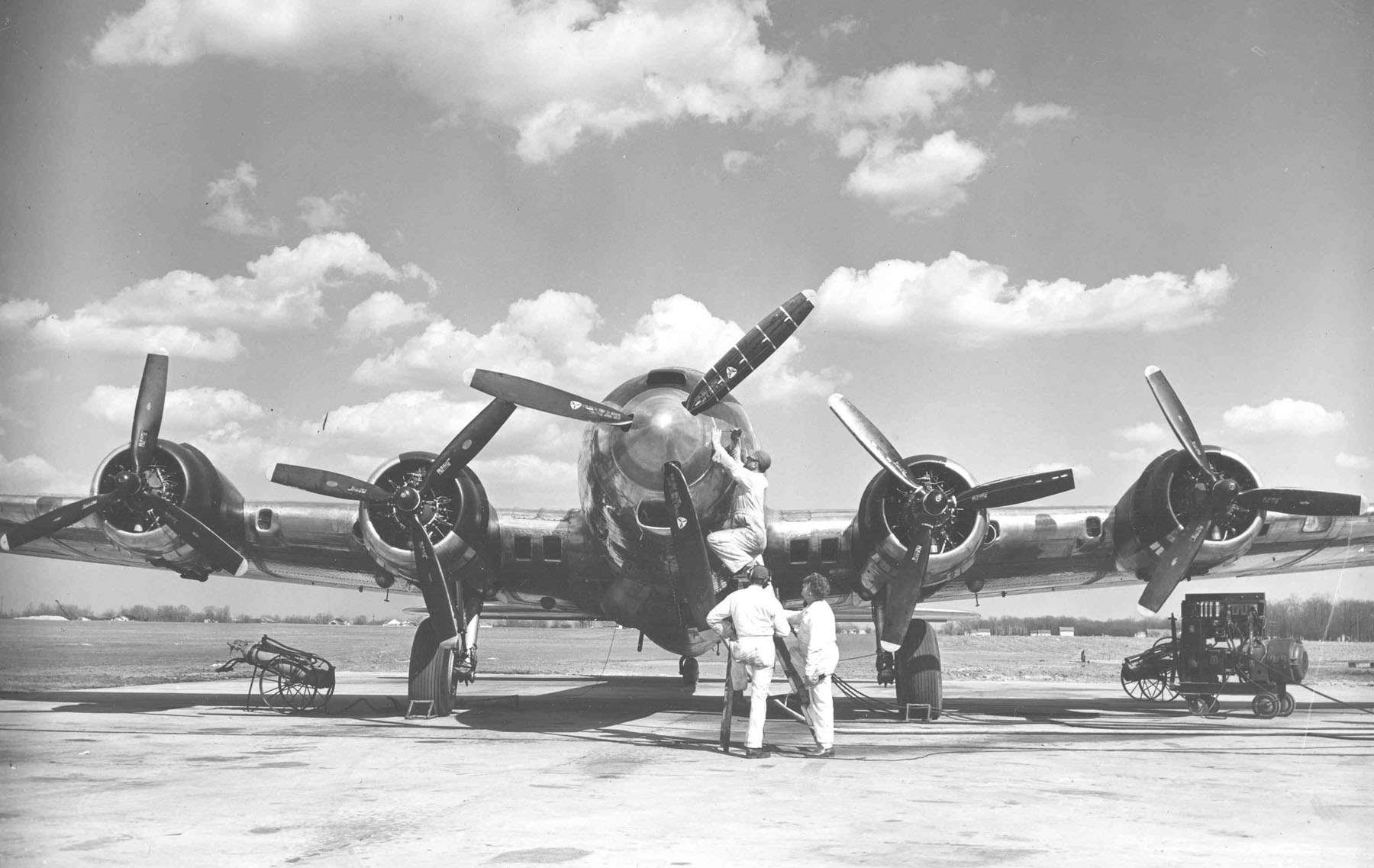
EB-17G (later JB-17G) was a B-17G converted to an engine test bed. The nose was replaced with a mount for a fifth engine.

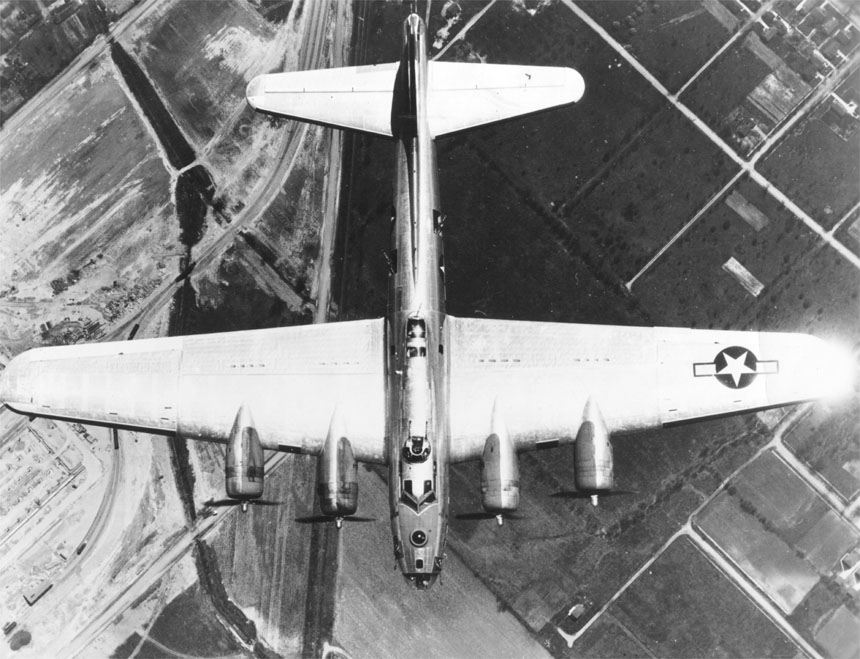
Top view of a B-17G in flight

All changes made to the Flying Fortress were incorporated into the final production version, the B-17G. These included the Bendix remotely-operated chin turret, bringing the bomber's defensive armament to thirteen .50 in (12.70 mm) machine guns. The waist gun windows were staggered to improve the gunner's freedom of movement, another carryover from the YB-40 "gunship" variant. The earliest B-17Gs lacked the "cheek" machine gun mounts, as it was believed that the chin turret provided sufficient forward firepower; they were quickly reintroduced. In a reversal of the B-17F's design, the starboard "cheek" machine gun mount was moved rearward and the port side mount was moved forward, just behind the edge of the bombardier's nose glazing to avoid interference with the storage of the chin turret's control yoke when it was not in use. For late production blocks of the G-series, the tail gun turret was revised. Referred to as the "Cheyenne" configuration (after the modification center where it was introduced, the United Airlines Modification Center in Cheyenne, Wyoming), its guns were mounted in a new turret with a reflector sight and a much greater field of fire. Some 8,680 were built, and dozens were converted for several different uses:

- CB-17G: Troop transport version, capable of carrying 64 troops.
- DB-17G: Drone variant
- DB-17P: Drone director
- EB-17G: Engine test-bed, company designation Model 299Z. Two aircraft modified from Lockheed-built B-17Gs. Later redesignated JB-17G.
- MB-17G: Missile launcher
- QB-17L: Target drone
- QB-17N: Target drone
- RB-17G: Reconnaissance variant
- SB-17G: Rescue version, later redesignated B-17H: Featured A-1 lifeboat under fuselage. After World War II, armament on the B-17Hs was removed; it was reinstated when the Korean War began.
- TB-17G: Special duty training version
- TB-17H: Training version of B-17H
- VB-17G: VIP transport
- PB-1: This designation was given to one B-17F and one B-17G. They were used by the U.S. Navy for various test projects.
- PB-1G: This designation was given to 17 B-17Gs used by U.S. Coast Guard as air-sea rescue aircraft.
- PB-1W: This designation was given to 31 B-17Gs used by the U.S. Navy as the first airborne early warning aircraft (AWACS).
- Model 229AB: Single B-17G converted as a VIP transport for Trans World Airlines.

=== Fortress Mk.III ===
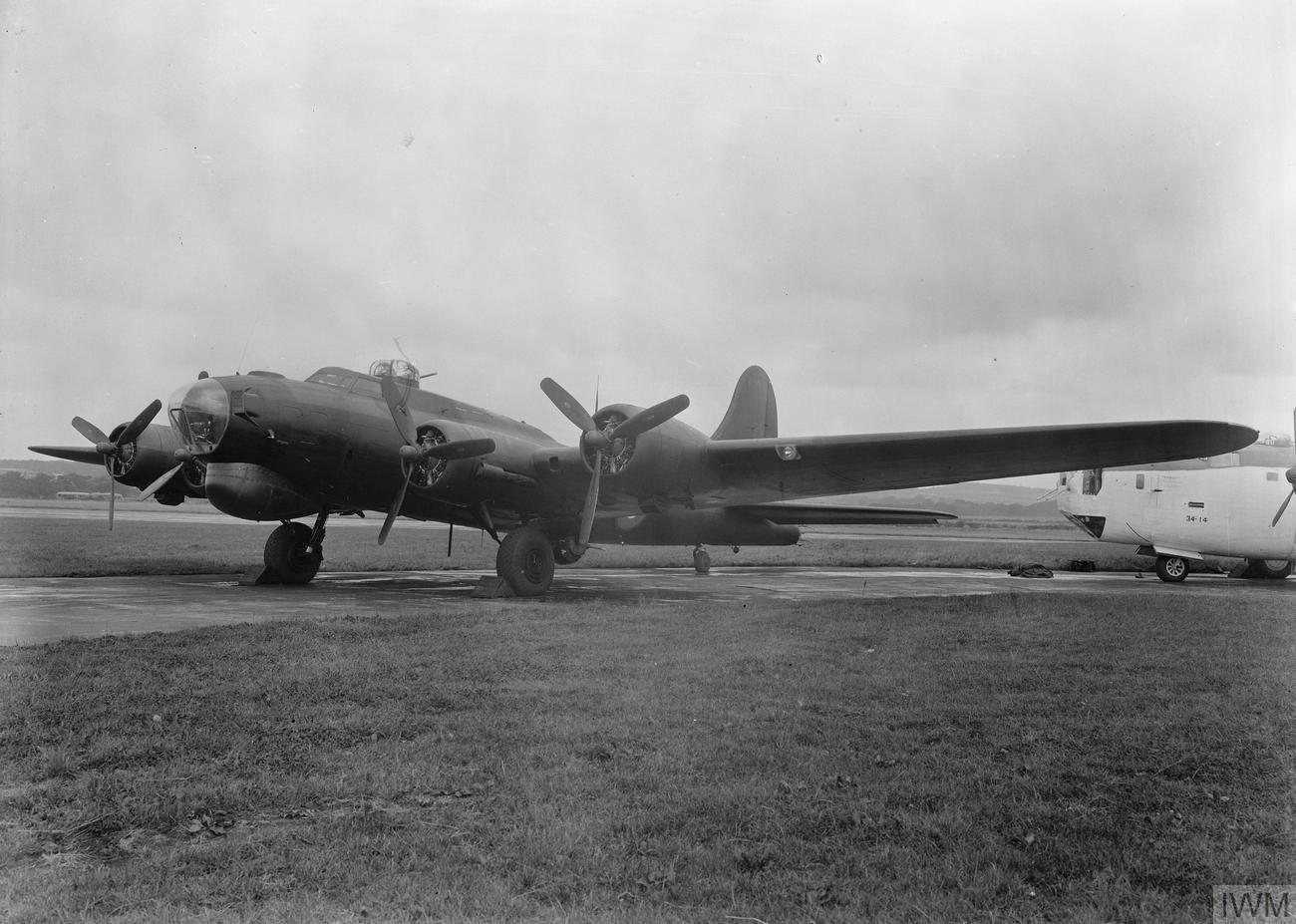
Fortress Mk.III (SD) electronic warfare aircraft of 214 Squadron RAF

Eighty-five B-17Gs were transferred to the RAF, where they received the designation Fortress Mk.III. Three were assigned to Coastal Command in the Azores and were fitted with radar before being reused by meteorological survey squadrons.

The rest were operated as Fortress Mk.III (SD) (Special Duties) from February 1944 by two squadrons of Bomber Command's No. 100 Group RAF, where they carried out electronic countermeasures to confuse or jam German radar in support of bombing missions.

These carried an extensive array of electronic equipment including airborne Grocer air-interception jammers, the Jostle VHF jammer, Monica tail-warning receiver, Gee and LORAN for navigation, and an H2S radar which replaced the chin turret. They were also used as decoys during night bombing attacks. Fortress Mk.IIIs were operational until the units disbanded in July 1945.

== B-17H ==
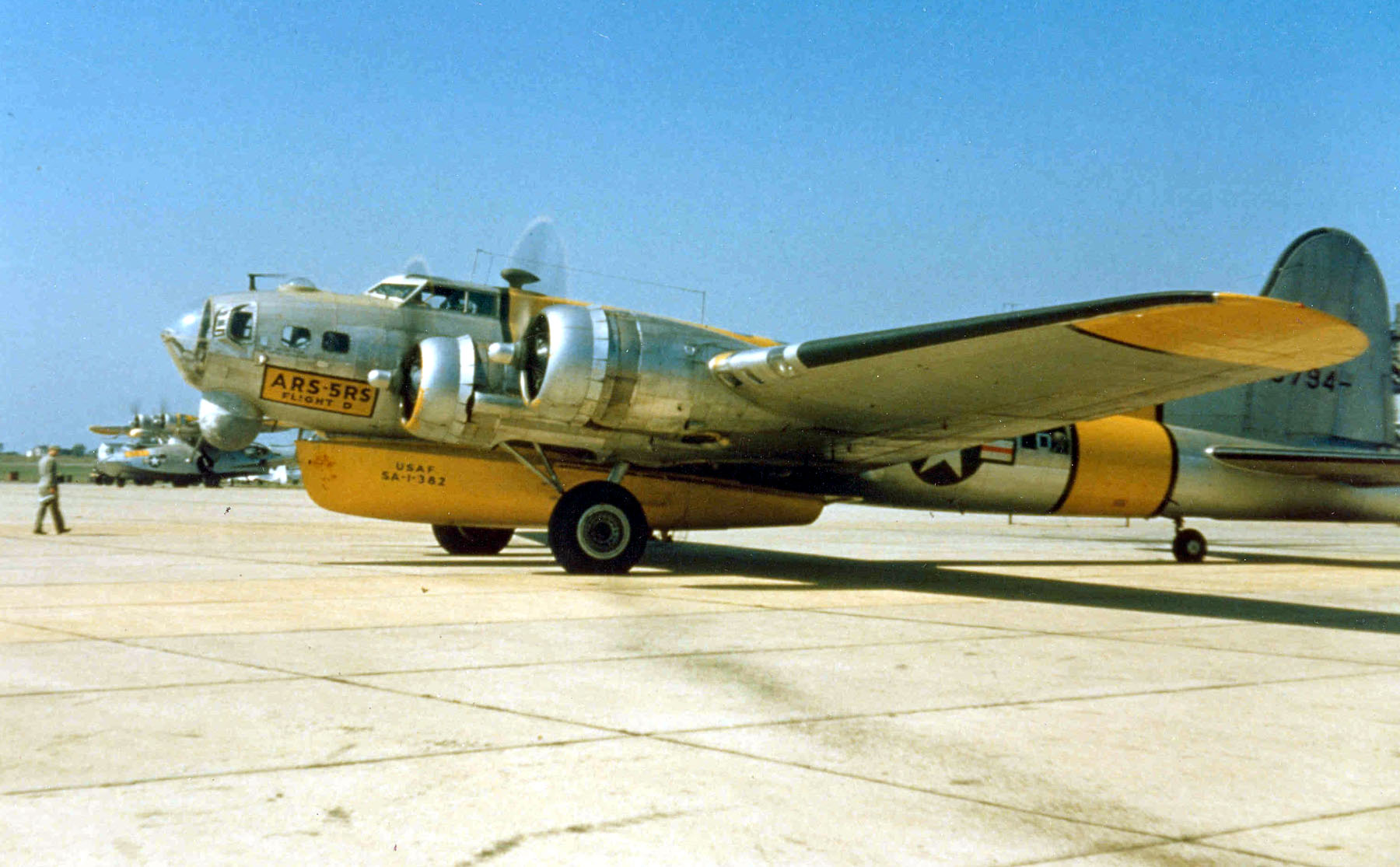
SB-17G-95DL 83794 5th RS / D Flight

About 130 B-17Gs were converted for air-sea rescue missions for the USAAF, carrying an airborne lifeboat. Of these, twelve received the new designation B-17H, with five B-17Hs becoming TB-17Hs. The B-17H and TB-17H were redesignated SB-17G in 1948.

== XB-38 ==
The XB-38 was a modification undertaken by the Vega division of Lockheed on the ninth B-17E built. It was to test the feasibility of using liquid-cooled Allison V-1710-89 engines, if the Wright R-1820 engine became scarce. Completing the modifications took less than a year, and the XB-38 made its first flight on 19 May 1943. While it showed a slightly higher top speed, after just a few flights it had to be grounded due to a problem with engine manifold joints leaking exhaust gases. Following this problem being resolved, testing continued until the ninth flight on 16 June 1943 when the inboard starboard engine caught fire, and the crew bailed out. The XB-38 was destroyed and the project was cancelled. The gains in modification were minimal and would have been disruptive to the existing Flying Fortress production. Allison engines were also considered to be more badly needed for fighters.

== YB-40 ==
Prior to the introduction of the P-51 Mustang, a B-17 "gunship" escort variant called the YB-40 was trialled. This aircraft differed from the standard B-17 in that a second dorsal turret was installed atop the radio operator's position between the forward dorsal turret and the waist guns, where only an upward firing single or double Browning M2 had been mounted; and a single .50 in (12.7 mm) machine gun at each waist station was replaced by a pair of .50 in (12.7 mm) guns, of basically the same twin-mount design used for the tail guns. In addition, the bombardier's equipment was replaced with twin .50 in (12.7 mm) machine guns in a remotely operated "chin" turret directly under the bombardier's position, augmenting the existing "cheek" machine guns; and the bomb bay was converted to a .50 caliber magazine. The YB-40 would provide a heavily armed gunship escort capable of accompanying the bombers all the way to a target and back. The aircraft was deemed a failure, however, because it could not keep up with standard B-17s once they had dropped their heavy bomb loads. It was withdrawn from service after just fourteen missions. (Twenty-six were built: one XB-40 prototype, 21 YB-40 pre-production aircraft, four TB-40 training aircraft.)

== C-108 Flying Fortress ==
Four B-17s were converted to serve as cargo carriers and V.I.P. transports under the designation C-108 Flying Fortress. Many more served in the same roles under the designations CB-17 and VB-17, respectively. The first of them, designated XC-108, was a B-17E partially stripped of military equipment and outfitted for passengers. It served as a V.I.P. transport for General Douglas MacArthur. A similar conversion was made on a B-17F, designated YC-108. The third plane, designated XC-108A, was made to test the feasibility of converting obsolete bombers to cargo aircraft. The B-17E chosen for the conversion was based in India, where it ferried supplies over the Himalaya to the base for the B-29 Superfortress in Chengdu, China. It proved a difficult aircraft to maintain, due to lack of spares for the Cyclone engines, and was returned to the United States, where it was based in Bangor, Maine, and flew a cargo route to Scotland until the end of the war. It was sold to a local dealer for scrap, but the airframe survived, and is currently being restored in Illinois. A final aircraft was built under the designation XC-108B, and was used as a tanker to transport fuel from India to Chengdu.

== F-9 Flying Fortress ==
Several B-17s were converted to long-range photographic reconnaissance aircraft, designated F-9 Flying Fortress. (The F was for 'foto' and is not to be confused with the use of F for 'fighter'.)

The first F-9 aircraft were sixteen B-17Fs, with bombing equipment replaced by photographic equipment. Some of the defensive armament was kept. An uncertain number of additional airframes were converted to a similar configuration to the F-9, but differed in minor details of their cameras, and received the designation F-9A. Some of these, along with more B-17Fs, received further camera alterations and became the F-9B. The final model was the F-9C, which was given to ten B-17G, converted in a similar fashion to the previous aircraft. Those surviving in 1948 were initially redesignated RB-17G (R indicating 'reconnaissance').

- FB-17: Post-war redesignation of all F-9 photo-reconnaissance aircraft.

== BQ-7 Aphrodite ==
Late in World War II, at least 25 B-17s were fitted with radio controls as BQ-7 drones for Operation Aphrodite. Loaded with 20,000 lb (9,100 kg) of Torpex high explosive and enough fuel for 350 mi (560 km), they were to be used to attack Nazi U-boat pens, V-1 flying bomb sites, and bomb-resistant fortifications.

The BQ-7s would be taken up to 2,000 ft (610 m) by two volunteers before transferring control to another B-17 and bailing out while still over England. The controlling B-17 would follow the BQ-7, aim to at the target and set its controls for a collision course, before itself returning. The normal cockpit lost its roof and the fairing behind it was removed.

Because the remote-control hardware was inadequate, Operation Aphrodite was riddled with problems. Between August 1944 and January 1945, 15 BQ-7s were launched against Germany, but none hit their targets, and several crew were killed, many in parachuting accidents. One BQ-7 left a 100 ft (30 m) crater in Britain and another circled an English port, out of control. The program was cancelled in early 1945.

== PB-1 and PB-1W ==
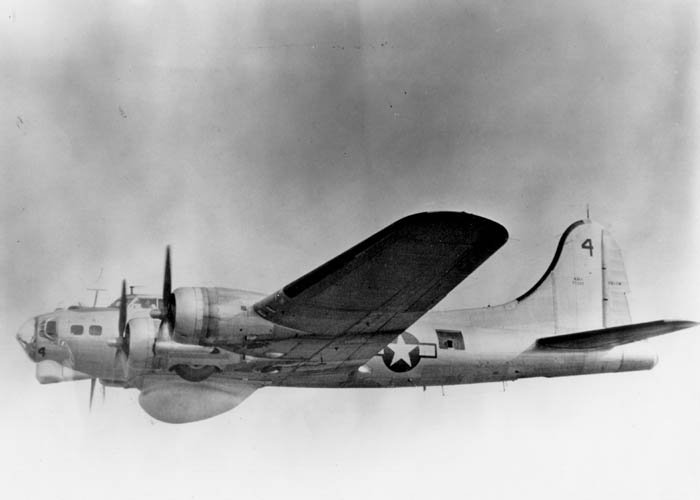
PB-1W circa 1947

The U.S. Navy (USN) received 48 B-17s towards the end of World War II, renamed PB-1 and used for maritime patrol missions. Post-war, the USN acquired 31 more B-17Gs, renamed PB-1W, and fitted with AN/APS-20 radar for Airborne Early Warning equipment and procedure development.

The Naval Air Material Center's Naval Aircraft Modification Unit (NAMU) at Johnsville, Pennsylvania modified the B-17s to PB-1W specification by sealing up the bomb bay doors and installing 300 gallon drop tanks on each wing, in addition to the "Tokyo Tanks" mounted in the outer wings, holding a total of 3,400 gallons of fuel, giving the PB-1W an endurance of 22+ hours. Initially PB-1W's retained the natural metal finish with a protective wax coat, but later the PB-1Ws were painted gloss Navy Blue overall.

The scanner for the one-megawatt AN/APS-20 Seasearch S-band Radio Detection and Ranging (RADAR), manufactured by Hazeltine Corporation/General Electric, was ventrally mounted in a bulbous housing below the redundant bomb bay, with the RADAR relay transmitter, Identification friend or foe (IFF), Radio Direction Finder (RDF), Instrument Landing System (ILS), and LOng RAnge Navigation (LORAN) also being installed during conversion.

The conversion introduced the following changes:

- Chin turret removed.
- Norden bombsight removed.
- Bombardier's station retained as a lookout post, while on ASW or airborne search and rescue (SAR) missions.
- Top forward turret removed.
- Cockpit armor removed.
- 300 U.S. gallon drop tanks fitted under the outer wings.
- Extra fuel tanks in the outer wings ("Tokyo Tanks").
- AN/APS-20 Seasearch S-band Radio Detection and Ranging (RADAR), with transmitter in the fuselage and aerial in a bulbous di-electric fairing under the former bomb-bay.
- Modernized Identification, Friend or Foe (IFF).
- Radio Direction Finder (RDF).
- Instrument Landing System (ILS).
- LOng RAnge Navigation (LORAN).
- 2 RADAR consoles facing aft in the former bomb-bay
- Radio operator's seat turned to face outboard.
- Waist gun positions and ball turret removed.
- Bench seats fitted for observers at the waist positions.
- Floating smoke markers carried.
- A latrine and a galley were fitted amidships.
- Tail guns and armor removed.
- Provision for spares and/or cargo to be carried in the tail section.

The crew for USN PB-1Ws consisted of six officers (Pilot in Command, Second in Command, Navigator, CIC Officer, and two RADAR Operators/Controllers) and five enlisted men (Plane Captain (now referred to as Crew Chief), 2nd Mechanic, Electronics Technician, and two Radio Operators).

First delivered to Patrol Bomber Squadron 101 (VPB-101) in the spring of 1946, the Navy was eventually to have twenty-two, out of thirty-one post-war B-17s, fully upgraded to PB-1W standard. Late in 1946, VPB-101 would move to NAS Quonset Point, Rhode Island, and be redesignated Airborne Early Warning Development Squadron Four (VX-4).

== PB-1G ==
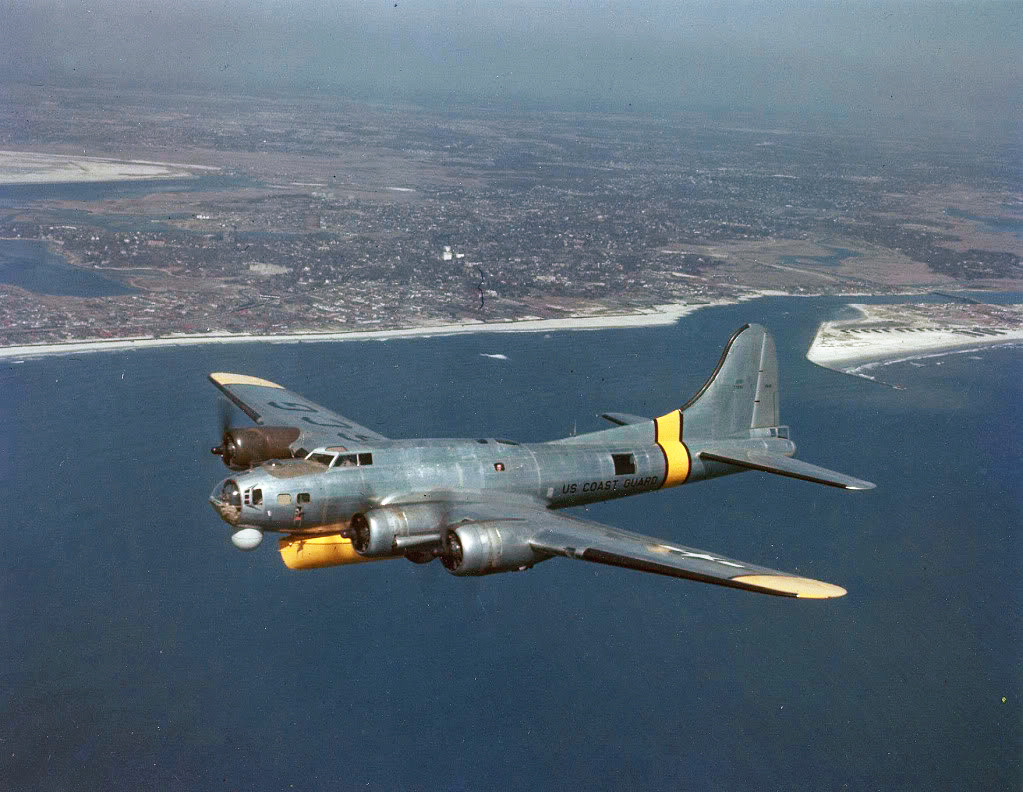
USCG PB-1G in flight

After the war, the United States Coast Guard (USCG) realized the need for a long range search and rescue aircraft to supplement its peace-time Sea Air Rescue (SAR) capabilities. Concurrently, the Army Air Force was retiring thousands of B-17 four-engine bombers, many still "factory-new" as they were delivered too late to see action. The USCG, always quick to take advantage of anything they could get inexpensively, requested that the Army Air Force loan eighteen of the bombers to the Coast Guard. The powerful, long-legged and stable bombers proved to be excellent additions to the Coast Guard's aviation fleet.

The Army Air Force had developed a lifeboat that was slung underneath the fuselage of a B-17 that would be dropped to survivors in the water. A parachute rig would deploy from the lifeboat after its release and allow it to descend safely to the surface. The Coast Guard adopted the A-1 lifeboat for many of its PB-1Gs (the naval designation for the Flying Fortress).Furthermore, the PB-1Gs were equipped with an ASV radar to assist in the SAR operations. Additionally, these aircraft were also used for the International Ice Patrol while another of the versatile PB-1Gs was modified to carry a nine-lens, 1.5 million dollar, aerial camera for mapping purposes. Interestingly, the Norden bombsight, used by the B-17s in their bombing campaign against Nazi Germany, was kept with this PB-1G and used to pinpoint targets for the camera.

In total 17 PB-1Gs served with the Coast Guard from 1945 through 1959. The final flight of the last PB-1G in USCG service ended at 1:46 p.m. on Wednesday 14 October 1959 when PB-1G 77254 landed at Coast Guard Air Station Elizabeth City. She had faithfully served the nation's oldest continuous sea service for fourteen years.

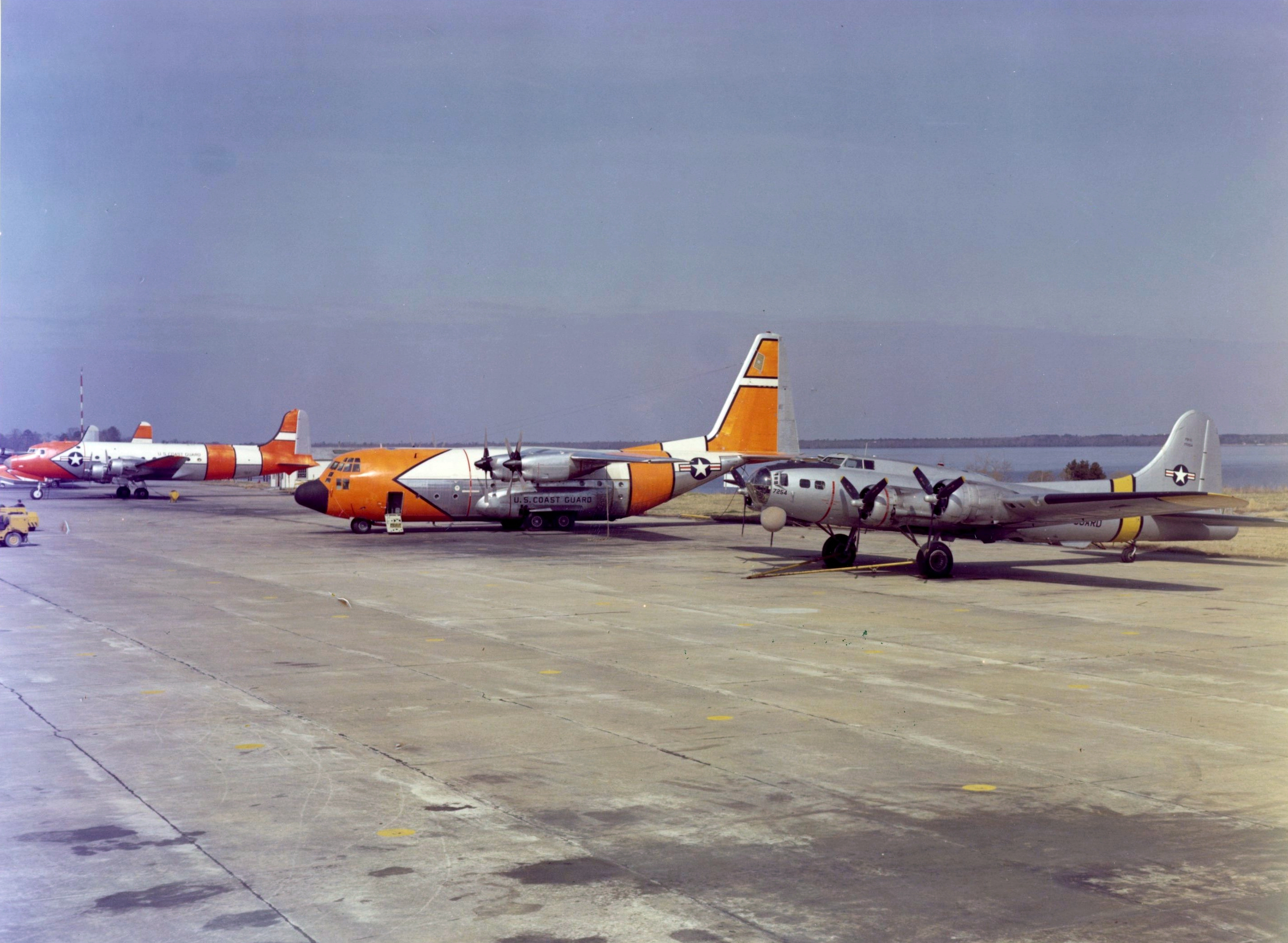
The last of the PB-1Gs and the first of the HC-130Bs in 1959

== Model 299J ==
The Model 299J was an unbuilt high-wing variant of the B-17 proposed in October 1938. It was to have been powered by four Pratt & Whitney R-2180 engines and would have had tricycle landing gear. The 299J was expected to have a top speed of 300 mph (480 km/h) and a maximum takeoff weight of 50,000 lb (23,000 kg).

== See also ==
- List of surviving Boeing B-17 Flying Fortresses
- List of bomber aircraft
- List of military aircraft of the United States
