= Consolidated XB-41 Liberator =

American bomber escort prototype

XB-41 Liberator
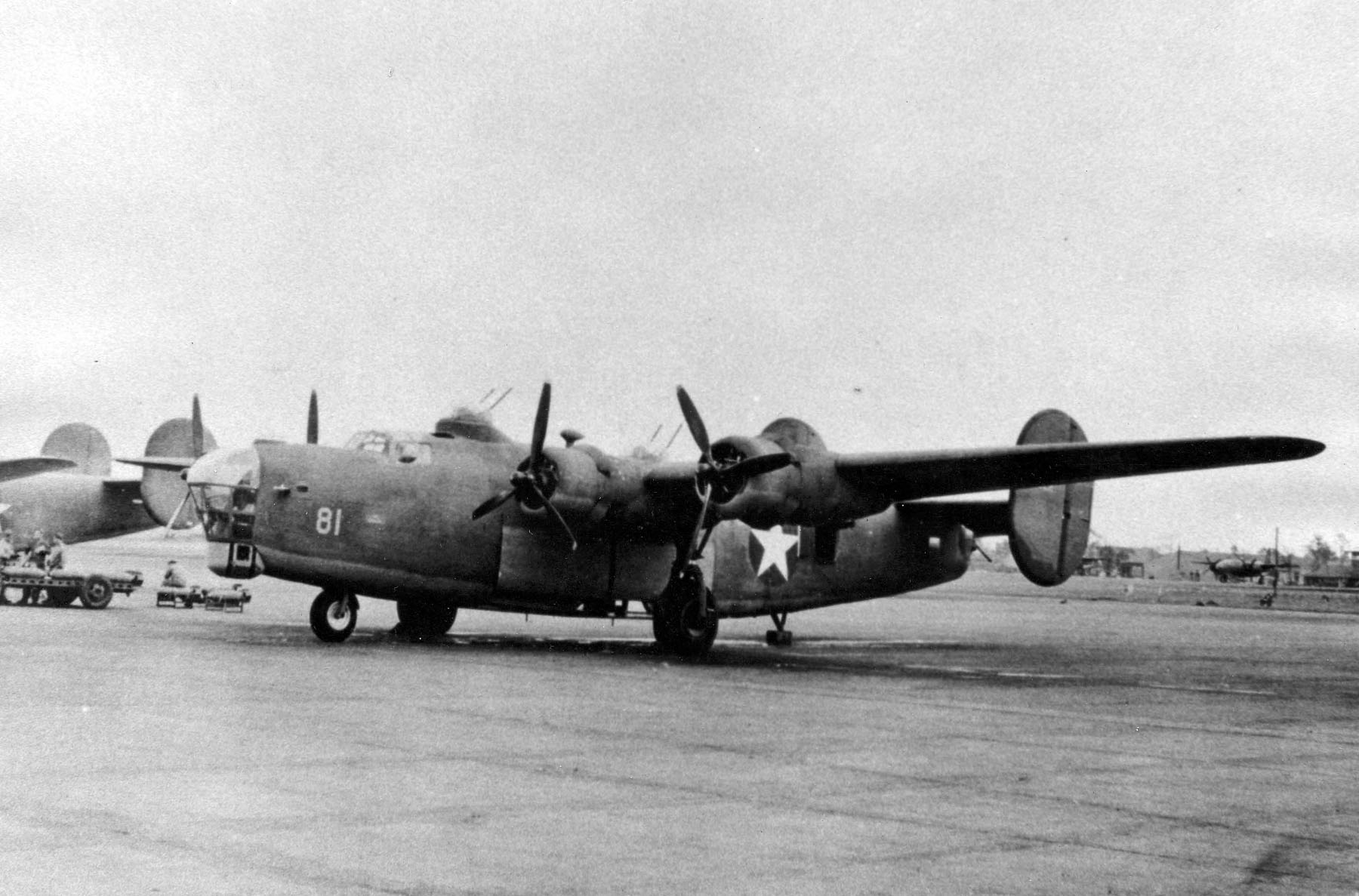

General information
- Type: Bomber escort
- Manufacturer: Consolidated Aircraft
- Status: Cancelled
- Primary user: United States Army Air Forces
- Number built: 1

History
- Developed from: Consolidated B-24 Liberator

The Consolidated XB-41 Liberator was a single Consolidated B-24D Liberator bomber, serial 41-11822, which was modified for the long-range escort role for U.S. Eighth Air Force bombing missions over Europe during World War II.

== Design and development ==
When the USAAF started strategic bombing in Europe, there were no fighters available to escort the bombers all the way to distant targets. The bombers carried several defensive guns and formed up in boxes so that they could provide mutually covering fire, but there was interest in providing more firepower for the formation. The XB-41 Liberator was outfitted with 14 .50 caliber (12.7 mm) machine guns. This was achieved by adding a second dorsal turret and a remotely operated Bendix turret (of the same type as fitted to the YB-40) under the chin to the standard twin-gun tail turret and twin-gun retractable ventral ball turret, plus twin mount guns at each waist window. The port waist mount was originally covered by a Plexiglas bubble; testing showed this caused severe optical distortion, and it was removed.

The XB-41 carried 12,420 rounds of ammunition, 4,000 rounds of which were stored in the bomb bay as a reserve. It was powered by four 1,250 hp (930 kW) Pratt & Whitney R-1830-43 radial engines.

== Operational history ==
On 29 January 1943, the sole XB-41 was delivered to Eglin Field, Florida. Tests were carried out for two months at Eglin during February 1943. These indicated significant problems with the aircraft; on 21 March 1943, the Army declared the XB-41 as unsuitable for operational use; the conversion of thirteen Liberators to YB-41 service test aircraft was cancelled. Despite this, Consolidated continued to work on the XB-41 prototype; wide-blade propellers were fitted, and some of the armor was removed to reduce the aircraft's weight. Tests resumed at Eglin on 28 July 1943; however, the basic flaws of the "gunship" concept remained, and the XB-41 program was abandoned. The prototype XB-41 was redesignated TB-24D; it served as an instructional airframe for training mechanics on the B-24. It was scrapped at Maxwell Field, Alabama, on 2 February 1945.

== Specifications (XB-41) ==
Data from

General characteristics

- Crew: nine
- Length: 66 ft 4 in (20.22 m)
- Wingspan: 110 ft 0 in (33.54 m)
- Height: 17 ft 11 in (5.46 m)
- Max takeoff weight: 63,000 lb (28,576 kg)
- Powerplant: 4 × Pratt & Whitney R-1830-43 radial engines, 1,250 hp (934 kW) each

Performance

- Maximum speed: 289 mph (465 km/h, 251 kn)
- Range: 3,100 mi (4,989 km, 2,700 nmi)
- Service ceiling: 28,500 ft (8,689 m)

Armament

- Guns: 14× .50 in(12.7 mm) M2 Browning machine guns

== See also ==
Related development

- Boeing YB-40 Flying Fortress
- Consolidated B-24 Liberator

Related lists

- List of bomber aircraft
- List of military aircraft of the United States
