= Boeing YB-40 Flying Fortress =

American experimental bomber escort

YB-40 Flying Fortress
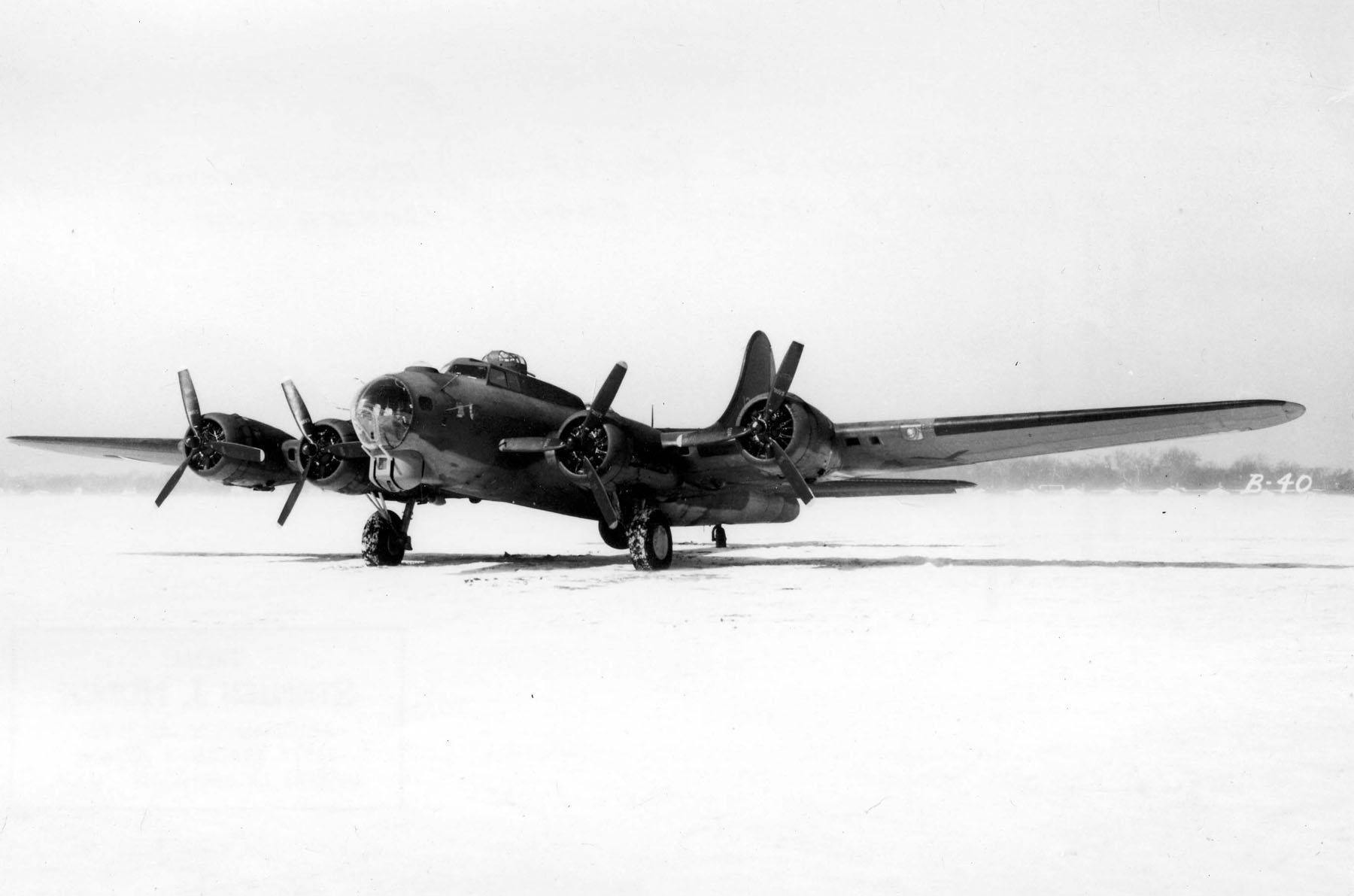
- The prototype XB-40 was a Boeing B-17F modified by Lockheed Vega (Project V-139) by converting the second production B-17F-1-BO (s/n 41-24341).

General information
- Type: Bomber escort
- Built by: Lockheed-Vega
- Primary user: United States Army Air Forces
- Number built: 25

History
- Introduction date: 29 May 1943
- First flight: 10 November 1942
- Retired: October 1943
- Developed from: Boeing B-17 Flying Fortress

The Boeing YB-40 Flying Fortress was a modification for operational testing purposes of the B-17 Flying Fortress bomber aircraft, converted to act as a heavily armed gunship to support other bombers during World War II. At the time of its development, long-range fighter aircraft such as the North American P-51 Mustang were just entering quantity production, and thus were not yet available to accompany bombers all the way from England to Germany and back.

== Design and development ==
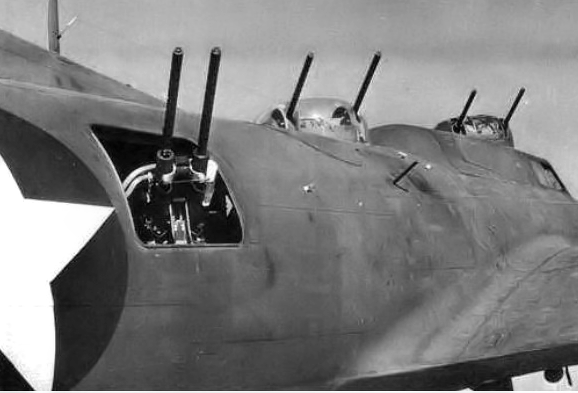
Close-up of the array of .50-caliber guns on the Boeing YB-40 Flying Fortress.

Work on the prototype, Project V-139, began in September 1942 by converting the second production B-17F-1-BO (serial number 41-24341) built. Conversion work was done by Lockheed's Vega company.

The aircraft differed from the standard B-17 in that a second manned dorsal turret was installed in the former radio compartment, just behind the bomb bay and forward of the ventral ball turret's location. The single .50-caliber light-barrel (12.7 mm) Browning machine gun at each waist station was replaced by two of them mounted side by side as a twin-mount emplacement, with a mount for each pair of these being very much like the tail gun setup in general appearance. The bombardier's equipment was also replaced by two .50-caliber light-barrel Browning AN/M2 machine guns in a remotely operated Bendix designed "chin"-location turret, directly beneath the bombardier's location in the extreme nose.

The existing "cheek" machine guns (on the sides of the forward fuselage at the bombardier station), initially removed from the configuration, were restored in England to provide a total of 16 guns, and the bomb bay was converted to an ammunition magazine. Additional armor plating was installed to protect crew positions.

The aircraft's gross weight was some 4,000 lb (1,800 kg) greater than a fully armed B-17. An indication of the burden this placed on the YB-40 is that while the B-17F on which it was based was rated to climb to 20,000 ft (6,100 m) in 25 minutes, the YB-40 was rated at 48 minutes. Part of the decreased performance was due to the weight increase, and part was due to the greater aerodynamic drag of the gun stations.

The first flight of the XB-40 was on 10 November 1942. The first order of 13 YB-40s was made in October 1942. A follow-up order for 12 more was made in January 1943. The modifications were performed by Douglas Aircraft at their Tulsa, Oklahoma center, and the first aircraft were completed by the end of March 1943. Twenty service test aircraft were ordered, Vega Project V-140, as YB-40 along with four crew trainers designated TB-40.

Because Vega had higher priority production projects, the YB-40/TB-40 assembly job was transferred to Douglas. A variety of different armament configurations was tried. Some YB-40s were fitted with four-gun nose and tail turrets. Some carried cannon of up to 40 mm in caliber, and a few carried up to as many as 30 guns of various calibers in multiple hand-held positions in the waist as well as in additional power turrets above and below the fuselage.

Externally, the XB-40 had the symmetrical waist windows of the standard B-17F and the second dorsal turret integrated into a dorsal fairing. In contrast, most of the YB-40s had the positions of the waist windows staggered for better freedom of movement for the waist gunners, and the aft dorsal turret was moved slightly backwards so that it stood clear of the dorsal fairing.

== Operational history ==
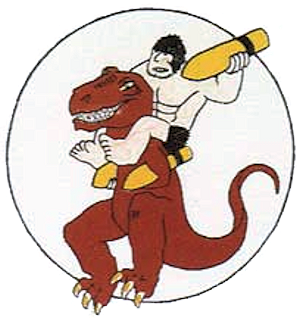
World War II emblem of the 327th Bombardment Squadron, featuring characters (Alley Oop and Dinny) from the Alley Oop comic strip

The YB-40's mission was to provide a heavily armed escort capable of accompanying bombers all the way to the target and back. Of the initial order of 13, one (serial 43-5732) was lost on the delivery flight from Iceland to the UK in May 1943; it force-landed in a peat bog on a Scottish island after running out of fuel. Although removed to Stornoway and repaired, it never flew in combat. The remaining 12 were allocated to the 92d Bombardment Group (Heavy), being assigned to the 327th Bombardment Squadron, stationed at RAF Alconbury (AAF-102) on 8 May 1943.

YB-40s flew in the following operational missions:

- 29 May 1943 – attacked submarine pens and locks at Saint-Nazaire. Smaller strikes were made at Rennes naval depot and U-boat yards at La Pallice. In the attack, seven YB-40s were dispatched to Saint-Nazaire; they were unable to keep up with B-17s on their return from the target and modification of the waist and tail gun feeds and ammunition supplies was found to be needed. The YB-40s were sent to Technical Service Command at the Abbots Ripton 2nd Strategic Air Depot for modifications.
- 15 June 1943 – four YB-40s were dispatched from Alconbury in a raid on Le Mans after completion of additional modifications.
- 22 June 1943 – attack on the I.G. Farben synthetic rubber plant at Hüls. The plant, representing a large percentage of the Germany's synthetic rubber producing capacity, was severely damaged. In the raid, 11 YB-40s were dispatched; aircraft 42-5735 was lost, being first damaged by flak and later shot down by a Focke-Wulf Fw 190A-2 of JG 1 over Pont, Germany. The 10 crew members survived and were taken prisoner.
- 25 June 1943 – attack on Blohm & Voss U-boat machine shops at Oldenburg. This was the secondary target, as the primary at Hamburg was obscured by clouds. In this raid, seven YB-40s were dispatched, of which two aborted. Two German aircraft were claimed as destroyed.
- 26 June 1943 – scheduled but aborted participation in attack on the Luftwaffe air depot at Villacoublay, France (primary target) and also the Luftwaffe airfield at Poissy, France. The five YB-40s assigned to the attack were unable to form up with the bombing squadron, and returned to base.
- 28 June 1943 – attack on the U-boat pens at Saint-Nazaire. In the raid, the only serviceable lock entrance to the pens was destroyed. In this attack, six YB-40s were dispatched, and one German aircraft was claimed as destroyed.
- 29 June 1943 – scheduled participation in attack on the Luftwaffe air depot at Villacoublay, but aircraft returned to Alconbury due to clouds obscuring the target. In the raid, two YB-40s dispatched, one aborted.
- 4 July 1943 – attacks on aircraft factories at Nantes and Le Mans, France. In these raids, two YB-40s were dispatched to Nantes and one to Le Mans.
- 10 July 1943 – attack on Caen/Carpiquet airfield. In this raid, five YB-40s were dispatched.
- 14 July 1943 – attacked Luftwaffe air depot at Villacoublay. In this raid, five YB-40s were dispatched.
- 17 July 1943 – YB-40s recalled from a raid on Hannover due to bad weather. In this raid, two YB-40s were dispatched.
- 24 July 1943 – YB-40s recalled from an attack on Bergen, Norway due to cloud cover. In this raid, one YB-40 was dispatched.
- 28 July 1943 – attack on the Fieseler aircraft factory at Kassel. In this raid, two YB-40s were dispatched.
- 29 July 1943 – attack on U-boat yards at Kiel. In this raid, two YB-40s were dispatched.

=== Summary ===
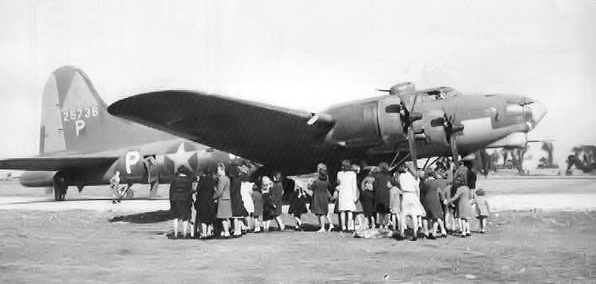
Boeing YB-40 Flying Fortress, 42-5736 ("Tampa Tornado") on display at RAF Kimbolton, England, 2 October 1943 when it was shown to those attending a party for local children.

Altogether of the 59 aircraft dispatched, 48 sorties were credited. Five confirmed and two probable German fighter kills were claimed, and one YB-40 was lost, shot down on 22 June mission to Hüls, Germany. Tactics were revised on the final five missions by placing a pair of YB-40s in the lead element of the strike to protect the mission commander.

The original design concept of the YB-40 never played out as intended in practice. Luftwaffe fighter chief Adolf Galland considered the gunship's handful of combat victories to be "insignificant" and not worth the cost of the aircraft. The increased weight from the additional machine guns and ammunition nearly cut the YB-40's climb rate in half from that of a B-17F, and in level flight it had difficulty keeping up with standard Flying Fortresses, especially after they had dropped their bombs. Despite the overall failure of the project as an operational aircraft, it led directly to the Bendix chin turret's fitment on the last 65 (86 according to some sources) Douglas-built aircraft starting with the B-17F-70-DL production block, (Note: Most sources say that the turret was introduced on the B-17F-75-DL, but photographic evidence indicates that the F-70-DL also had the turret.) and were part of the standardized modifications conspicuous on the final production variant of the B-17, the B-17G:

- Chin turret (first introduced on the last 86 Douglas-built "final production" blocks of the B-17F-DL aircraft)
- Offset waist gun positions
- Improved tail gunner station with much larger windows, usually nicknamed the "Cheyenne", after the Cheyenne Modification Center.

Once the test program ended, most of the surviving aircraft returned to the U.S. in November 1943 and were used as trainers. 42-5736 ("Tampa Tornado") was flown to RAF Kimbolton on 2 October 1943 where it was put on display and later used as a group transport. It was returned to the United States on 28 March 1944. All of the aircraft were sent to reclamation, mostly at RFC Ontario in May 1945, being broken up and smelted. A couple of the YB-40s can be seen in the 1946 movie The Best Years of Our Lives, in the famous scene shot at the Ontario "graveyard". No airframes were sold on the civil market.

== Operators ==
United States

- United States Army Air Forces

XB-40: Conversion of B-17F-1-BO 41-24341 (Not deployed to ETO)
YB-40: Conversions of B-17F-10-VE 42-5732; 5733, "Peoria Prowler"; 5734, "Seymour Angel"; 5735, "Wango Wango"; 5736, "Tampa Tornado"; 5737, "Dakota Demon"; 5738, "Boston Tea Party"; 5739, "Lufkin Ruffian"; 5740, "Monticello"; 5741, "Chicago"; 5742, "Plain Dealing Express"; 5743, "Woolaroc"; 5744, "Dollie Madison" (All deployed to ETO)
YB-40: Conversions of B-17F-35-VEs 42-5920, 5921, 5923, 5924, 5925, and 5927 (Not deployed to ETO)
TB-40: Conversions of B-17F-25-VEs 42-5833 and 5834; B-17F-30-VE 42-5872, and B-17F-35-VE 42-5926 (5833 deployed to ETO, but not used in combat; remainder stayed in the United States).

== Specifications (YB-40) ==
Data from

General characteristics

- Crew: 10
- Length: 74 ft 9 in (22.6 m)
- Wingspan: 103 ft 9 in (31.4 m)
- Height: 19 ft 1 in (5.8 m)
- Wing area: 1,527 sq ft (141.9 m^{2})
- Empty weight: 54,900 lb (24,900 kg)
- Gross weight: 63,500 lb (28,800 kg)
- Max takeoff weight: 74,000 lb (33,565 kg)
- Powerplant: 4 × Wright R-1820-65 "Cyclone" turbosupercharged radial engines, 1,200 hp (895 kW) each

Performance

- Maximum speed: 292 mph (470 km/h, 254 kn)
- Cruise speed: 196 mph (315 km/h, 170 kn)
- Range: 2,260 mi (3,640 km, 1,960 nmi)
- Service ceiling: 29,200 ft (8,900 m)
- Rate of climb: 416 ft/min (2.11 m/s)
- Wing loading: 47.2 lb/sq ft (231 kg/m^{2})
- Power/mass: 0.066 hp/lb (0.11 kW/kg)

Armament

- Guns: 18 (or more) × .50 in (12.7 mm) M2 Browning machine guns. Typically used 14–16, with room for up to 30.

Ammunition carried
Location	Rounds
Nose	2,200
Front top turret	2,500
Aft top turret	3,300
Ball turret	300
Waist guns	1,200
Tail guns	1,200
Total	10,700

== See also ==
Related development

- Consolidated XB-41 Liberator
- Old 666 – a modified B-17E Flying Fortress based in New Guinea that had a total of nineteen .50-caliber machine guns installed.
