= Gunship =

Type of military aircraft

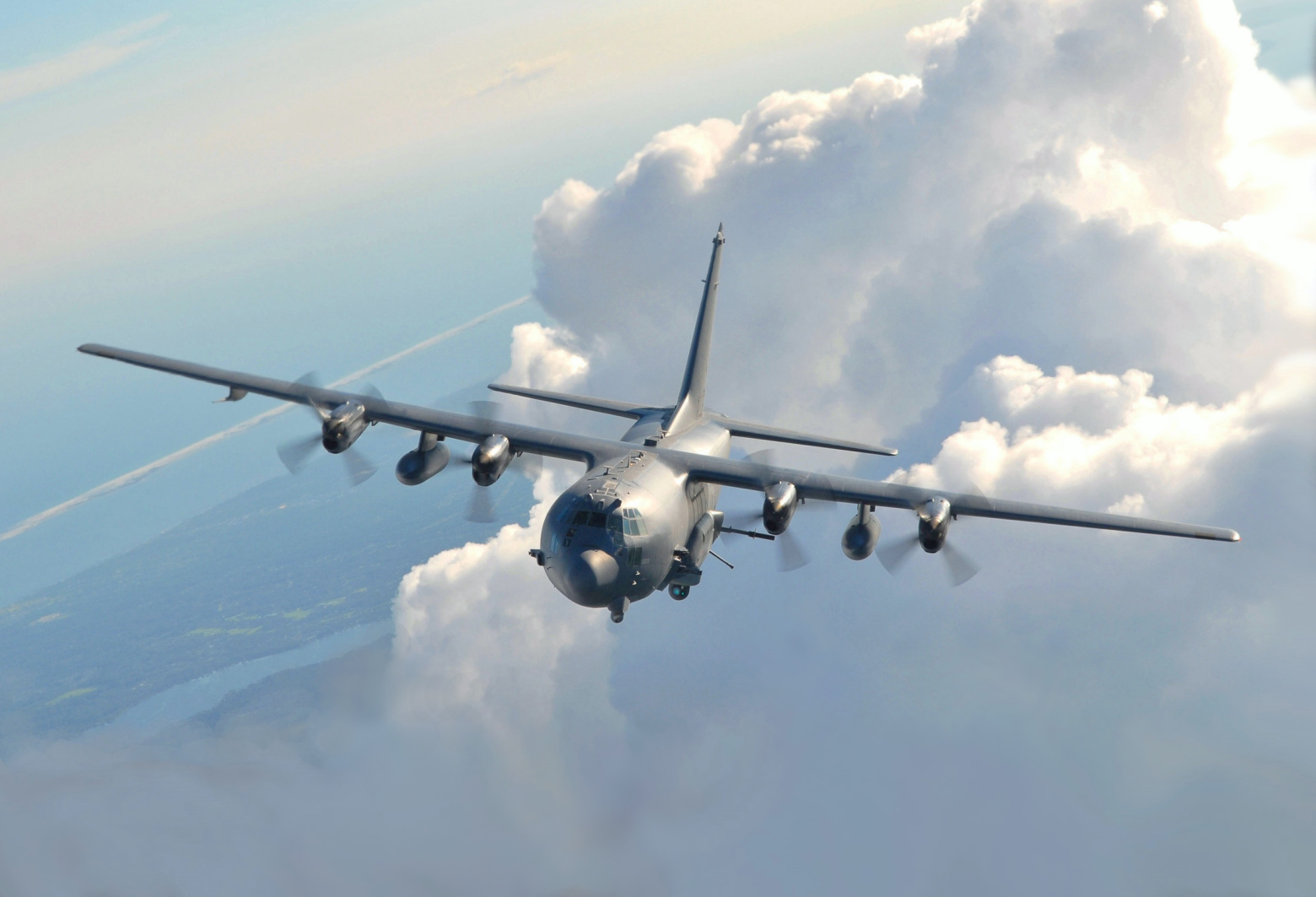
An AC-130H gunship from the 16th Special Operations Squadron

A gunship is a military aircraft armed with heavy guns or autocannons primarily intended to serve as a loitering base of fire for direct-fire attacks upon ground targets, either as a dedicated airstrike or to provide close air support for friendly land forces.

The term "gunship" originated in the mid-19th century as a synonym for gunboat, and might also refer to the heavily armed ironclad steamships used for blockades during the American Civil War. In modern usage, the term gunship refers specifically to fixed-wing aircraft with laterally-mounted heavy armaments (typically installed only on one side) firing out from the side of the fuselage (similar to the broadside battery of Age of Sail warships), which are harmonized to target the apex of an imaginary cone formed by the aircraft's flight path and the ground when performing a pylon turn (banking turn). Unlike attack aircraft and dive bombers, gunship aircraft are configured to fly past circling around the target, instead of performing strafing runs towards it.

The term helicopter gunship is commonly used to describe armed helicopters, which can also perform similar loitering attacks using door guns, but modern attack helicopters typically perform loitering strikes using air-to-surface missiles, unguided rockets and chain guns when hovering or by moving sideways to circle around a target while keeping the nose pointing towards it (i.e. a so-called "nose pivot turn").

== World War II aviation ==
=== Bomber escort ===
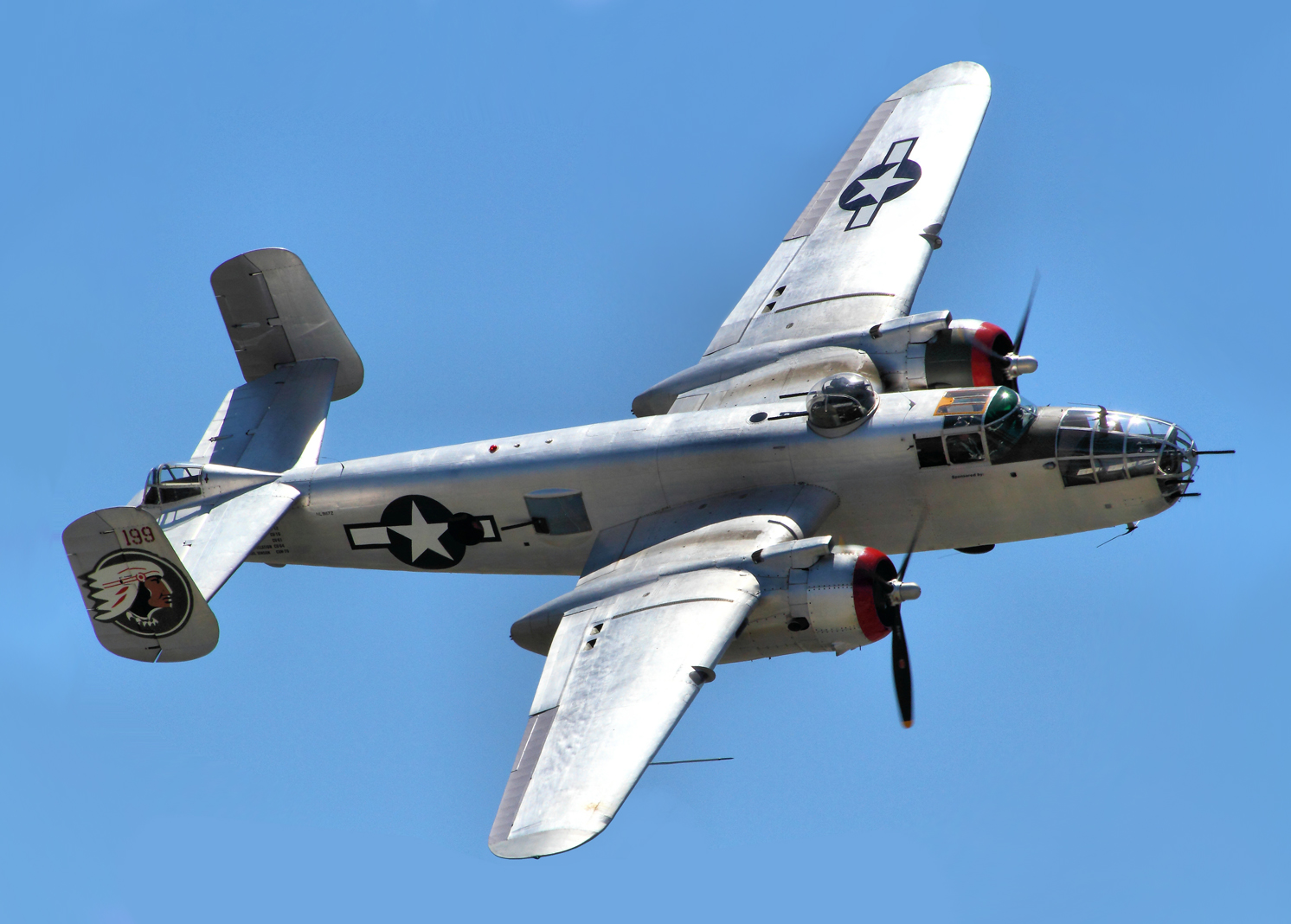
Some B-25 bomber variants were heavily armed with 75 mm cannons and .50 caliber machine guns.

During 1942 and 1943, the lack of a usable escort fighter for the United States Army Air Forces in the European Theatre of Operations led to experiments in dramatically increasing the armament of a standard Boeing B-17F Flying Fortress, and later a single Consolidated B-24D Liberator, to each have 14 to 16 Browning AN/M2 .50 cal machine guns as the Boeing YB-40 Flying Fortress and Consolidated XB-41 Liberator respectively. These were to accompany regular heavy bomber formations over occupied Europe on strategic bombing raids for long-range escort duties as "flying destroyer gunships". The YB-40 was sometimes described as a gunship, and a small 25-aircraft batch of the B-17-derived gunships was built, with a dozen of these deployed to Europe; the XB-41 had problems with stability and did not progress.

=== Attack aircraft ===
During World War II, the urgent need for hard-hitting attack aircraft led to the development of the heavily armed gunship versions of the North American B-25 Mitchell. For use against shipping in the Pacific 405 B-25Gs were armed with a 75 mm (2.95 in) M4 cannon and a thousand B-25Hs followed. The H models, delivered from August 1943, moved the dorsal turret forward to just behind the cockpit and were armed with the lighter 75 mm T13E1 cannon. The B-25J variant removed the 75 mm gun but carried a total of eighteen 0.50 cal (12.7 mm) AN/M2 Browning machine guns, more than any other contemporary American aircraft: eight in the nose, four in under-cockpit conformal flank-mount gun pod packages, two in the dorsal turret, one each in the pair of waist positions, and a pair in the tail, giving a maximum of fourteen guns firing forward in strafing runs. Later the B-25J was armed with eight 5 in (130 mm) high velocity aircraft rockets (HVARs).

The British also produced large numbers of twin-engined fighter-bombers. The de Havilland Mosquito FB.VI had a fixed armament of four 20 mm (0.787 in) Hispano Mk.II cannon and four .303 in (7.70 mm) Browning machine guns, together with up to 4,000 pounds (1,800 kg) of bombs in the bomb bay and on racks housed in streamlined fairings under each wing, or up to eight "60 lb" RP-3 rockets. De Havilland also produced seventeen Mosquito FB Mk XVIIIs armed with a 57 mm (2.24 in) QF 6-pdr anti-tank gun with autoloader, which were used against German ships and U-boats.

The Germans also made a sizable number of heavy fighter types (Zerstörer—"destroyer") armed with heavy guns (Bordkanone). Dedicated "tankbuster" aircraft such as the Ju 87Gs (Kanonenvogel) were armed with two BK 37 mm autocannon in underwing gun pods. The Ju 88P gunships were armed with 37, 50 and 75 mm (1.46, 1.97 and 2.95 in) guns, and were used as tankbusters and as bomber destroyers. The Hs 129 could carry a 30 mm (1.181 in) MK 101 cannon or MK 103 cannon in a conformally mounted gun pod (B-2/R-2). The Me 410 Hornisse were armed with the same BK 50 mm autocannon as the Ju 88P-4, but were only used as bomber destroyers. None of the German twin-engine heavy fighter types were produced or converted in large numbers.

== Post–World War II aviation ==
=== Fixed-wing aircraft ===
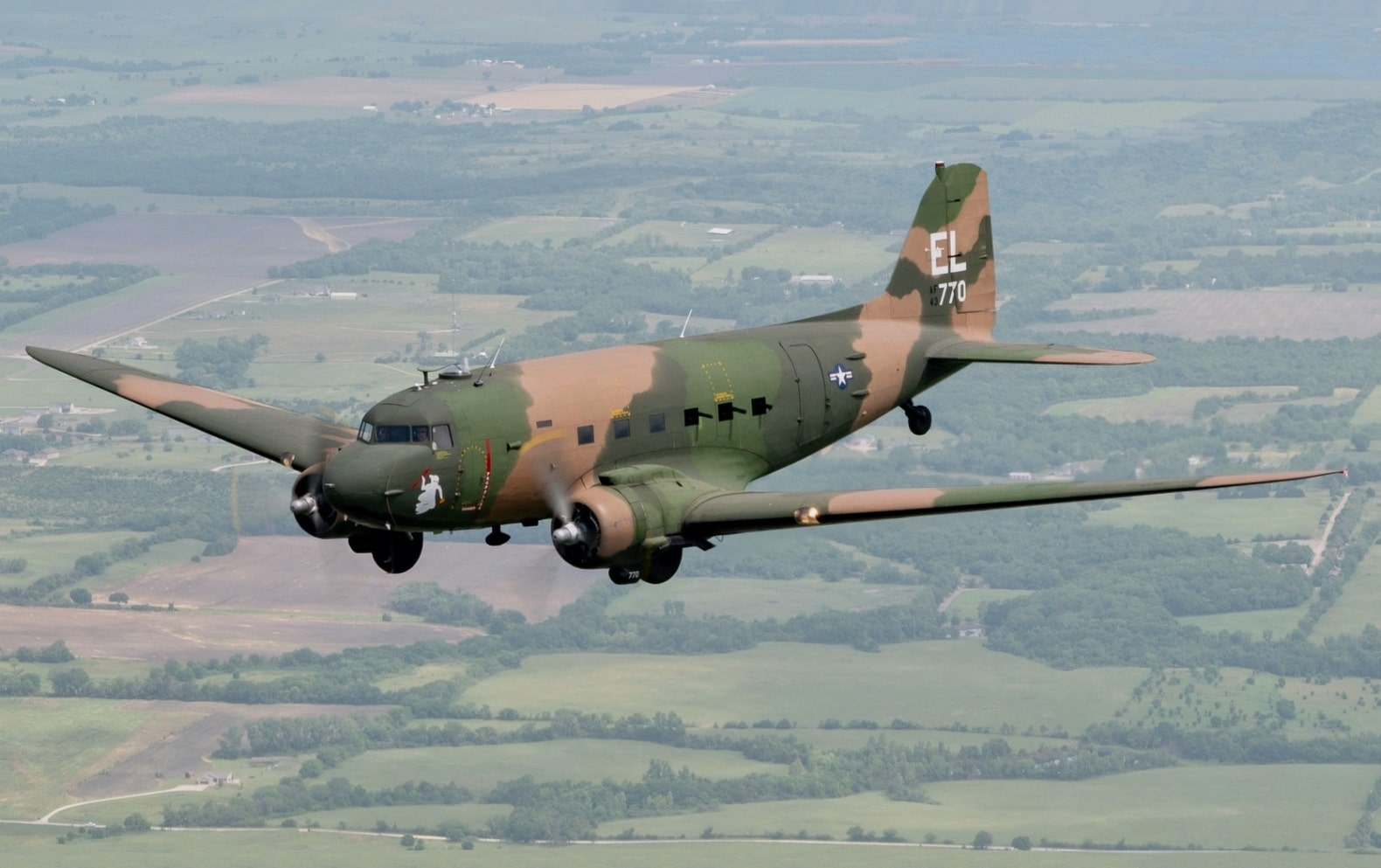
The AC-47 provided CAS with three port side mounted 7.62 mm miniguns.

In the more modern, post-World War II fixed-wing aircraft category, a gunship is an aircraft having laterally-mounted heavy armaments (i.e., firing to the side) to attack ground or sea targets. These gunships were configured to circle the target instead of performing strafing runs. Such aircraft have their armament on one side harmonized to fire at the apex of an imaginary cone formed by the aircraft and the ground when performing a pylon turn (banking turn).

The Douglas AC-47 Spooky was the first notable modern gunship. In 1964, during the Vietnam War, the popular Douglas C-47 Skytrain transport was successfully modified into a gunship by the United States Air Force with three side-firing Miniguns for circling attacks. At the time, the aircraft was known as a "Dragonship", "Puff, the Magic Dragon," or "Spooky" (officially designated FC-47, later corrected to AC-47). Its three 7.62 mm (0.300 in) miniguns could selectively fire either 50 or 100 rounds per second. Cruising in an overhead left-hand orbit at 120 knots (220 km/h; 140 mph) air speed at an altitude of 3,000 feet (900 m), the gunship could put a bullet or glowing red tracer (every fifth round) into every square yard of a football field–sized target in potentially less than 10 seconds. And, as long as its 45-flare and 24,000-round basic load of ammunition held out, it could do this intermittently while loitering over the target for hours.

The lesser-known Fairchild AC-119G Shadow and AC-119K Stingers were twin-engine piston-powered gunships developed by the United States during the Vietnam War. Armed with four 7.62 mm GAU-2/A Miniguns (and two 20 mm (0.787 in) M61 Vulcan six-barrel rotary cannons in the AC-119K version), they replaced the Douglas AC-47 Spooky. They operated alongside the early versions of the Lockheed AC-130 gunship.

AC-130 Side-Firing Aircraft: Basic Combat Operations (1970) Official de-classified training film reel.

It was the latter, larger Lockheed AC-130 Gunship II that became the modern, post–World War II origin of the term "gunship" in military aviation. These heavily armed aircraft used a variety of weapon systems, including 7.62 mm (0.300 in) GAU-2/A Miniguns, 20 mm (0.787 in) M61 Vulcan six-barrel rotary cannons, 25 mm (0.984 in) GAU-12/U Equalizer five-barreled rotary cannons, 30 mm (1.181 in) Mk44 Bushmaster II chain guns, 40 mm (1.58 in) L/60 Bofors autocannons, and 105 mm (4.134 in) M102 howitzers. The Douglas AC-47 Spooky, the Fairchild AC-119, and the AC-130 Spectre/Spooky, were vulnerable, and meant to operate only after achieving air superiority.

Smaller gunship designs such as the Fairchild AU-23 Peacemaker and the Helio AU-24 Stallion were also designed by the United States during the Vietnam War. These aircraft were meant to be cheap and easy to fly and maintain. They were to be given to friendly governments in Southeast Asia to assist with counter-insurgency operations, eventually seeing service with the Khmer National Air Force, Royal Thai Air Force, and Republic of Vietnam Air Force as well as limited use by the United States Air Force.

Renewed interest in the concept of gunships has resulted in the development of a gunship variant of the Alenia C-27J Spartan. Although the United States Air Force decided not to procure the AC-27J, other nations including Italy have chosen the aircraft for introduction. Additionally, in 2013 the US Air Force Special Operations Command reportedly tested a gunship version of the C-145A Skytruck armed with a GAU-18 twin-mount 0.50 in (12.7 mm) machine gun system.

Some air forces in the Middle East have begun experimenting with smaller gunships than the AC-130, with the Jordan Air Force converting 2 AC-235s and a single AC-295 into gunships. These are armed with ATK's side-mounted M230 30 mm (1.181 in) chain guns and various munitions, including 2.75 in (70 mm) rockets, Hellfire missiles, and bombs, mounted onto wing pylons.

=== Helicopter gunships ===
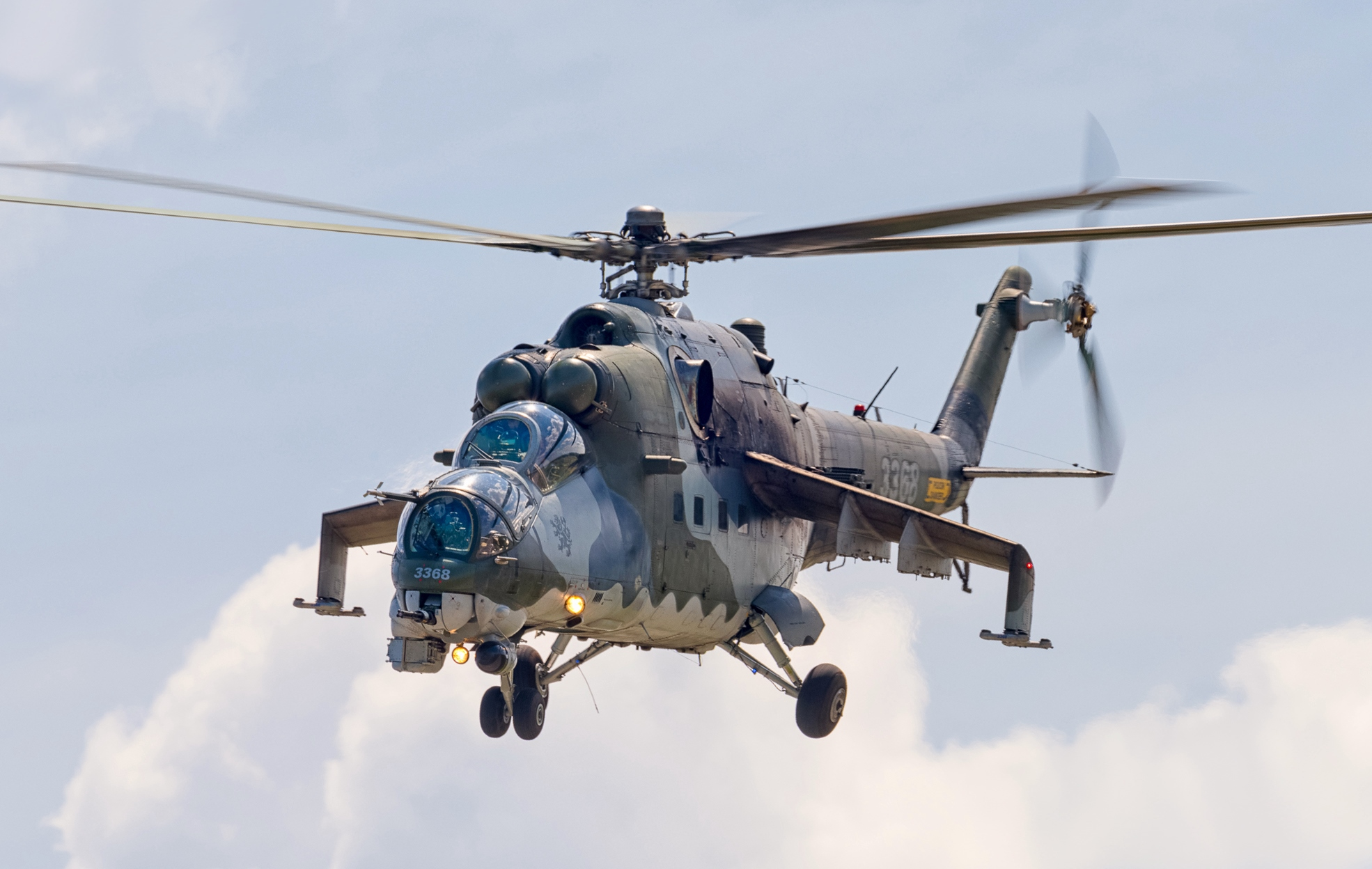
The Mil Mi-24 was one of the first dedicated gunship helicopters.

Early helicopter gunships also operated in the side-firing configuration, with an early example being the Aérospatiale Alouette III. During the overseas wars in Africa in the 1960s, the Portuguese Air Force experimented with the installation of M2 Browning 0.50 in (12.7 mm) machine guns in a side-firing twin-mounting configuration in some of its Alouette III helicopters. Later, the machine guns were replaced by a MG 151 20 mm cannon in a single mounting. These helicopters were known in Portuguese service as "helicanhões" (heli-cannons). They were used to escort unarmed transport helicopters in air assault operations and to provide fire support to troops on the ground. The South African and Rhodesian air forces later used armed Alouette III in similar configurations as the Portuguese, respectively in the South African Border and Rhodesian Bush wars.

During the Algerian War, the French operated Sikorsky H-34 "Pirate" armed with a German 20 mm MG151 cannon and two .50 inch machine guns. During the early days of the Vietnam War, USMC H-34s were among the first helicopter gunships in theater, fitted with the Temporary Kit-1 (TK-1), comprising two M60C machine guns and two 19-shot 2.75 inch rocket pods. The operations were met with mixed enthusiasm, and the armed H-34s, known as "Stingers", were quickly phased out. The TK-1 kit would form the basis of the TK-2 kit used later on the USMC's UH-1E helicopters.

The U.S. Army also experimented with H-34 gunships armed with M2 .50 caliber machine-guns and 2.75-inch rockets. In September 1971, a CH-34 was armed with two M2 .50 caliber machine guns, four M1919 .30 caliber machine guns, forty 2.75-inch rockets, two 5-inch high velocity aerial rockets (HVAR), plus two additional .30 caliber machine guns in the left side aft windows and one .50 caliber machine gun in the right side cargo door. The result was the world's most heavily armed helicopter at the time.

Also, during the Vietnam War, the ubiquitous Bell UH-1 Iroquois helicopters were modified into gunships by mounting the U.S. Helicopter Armament Subsystems—these were forward-firing weapons, such as machine guns, rockets, and autocannons, that began to appear in 1962–1963. Helicopters can use a variety of combat maneuvers to approach a target. In their case, the term gunship is synonymous with heavily armed helicopter. Specifically, dedicated attack helicopters such as the Bell AH-1 Cobra also fit this meaning. In any case, the gunship armaments include machine guns, rockets, and missiles.

The Soviet Mil Mi-24 (NATO code name: Hind) is a large, heavily armed and armored helicopter gunship and troop transport. It was introduced in the 1970s and operated by the pre-1991 Soviet Air Force and its successors post-1991, and more than 30 other nations. It was heavily armed with a reinforced fuselage, designed to withstand .50 caliber (12.7 mm) machine gun fire. Its armored cockpits and titanium rotor head can withstand 20 mm cannon fire.

== Examples ==
=== Fixed-wing aircraft ===
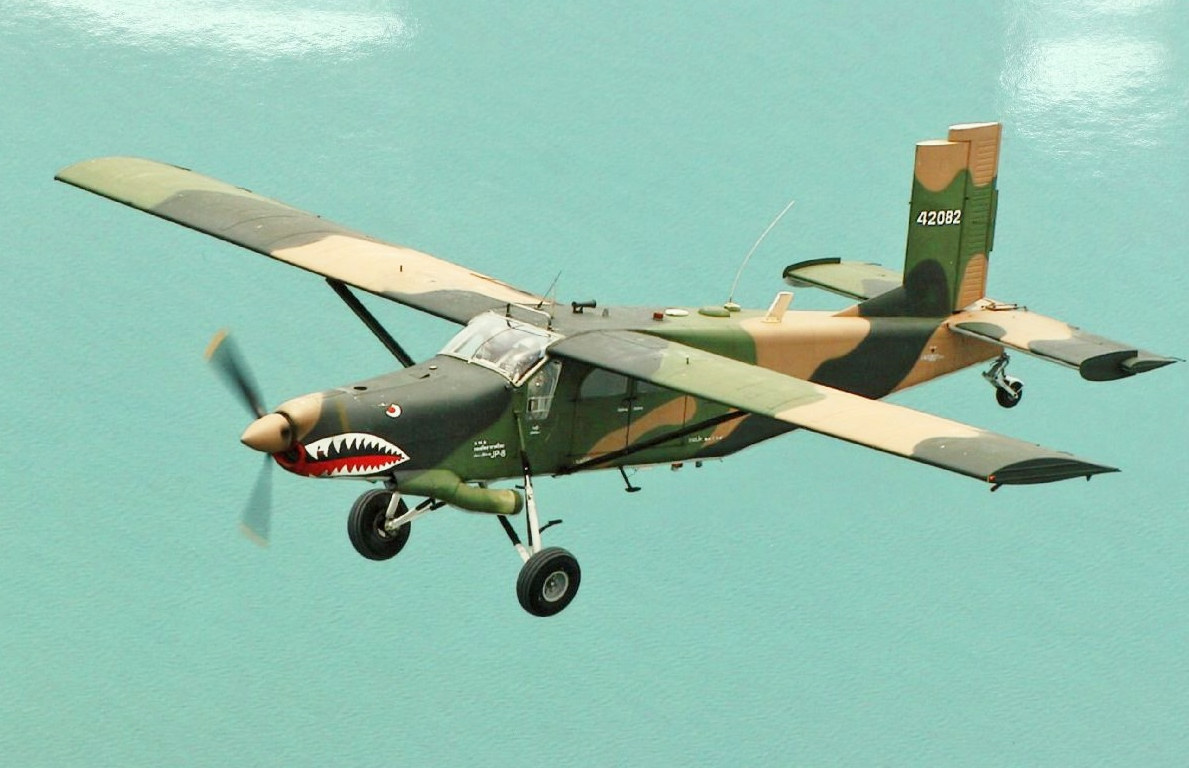
The Fairchild AU-23A in flight

- Basler BT-67
- Douglas AC-47
- Fairchild AU-23 Peacemaker
- Fairchild AC-119
- Lockheed AC-130
- Helio AU-24 Stallion
- Airbus AC-235
- Airbus AC-295

=== Helicopters ===
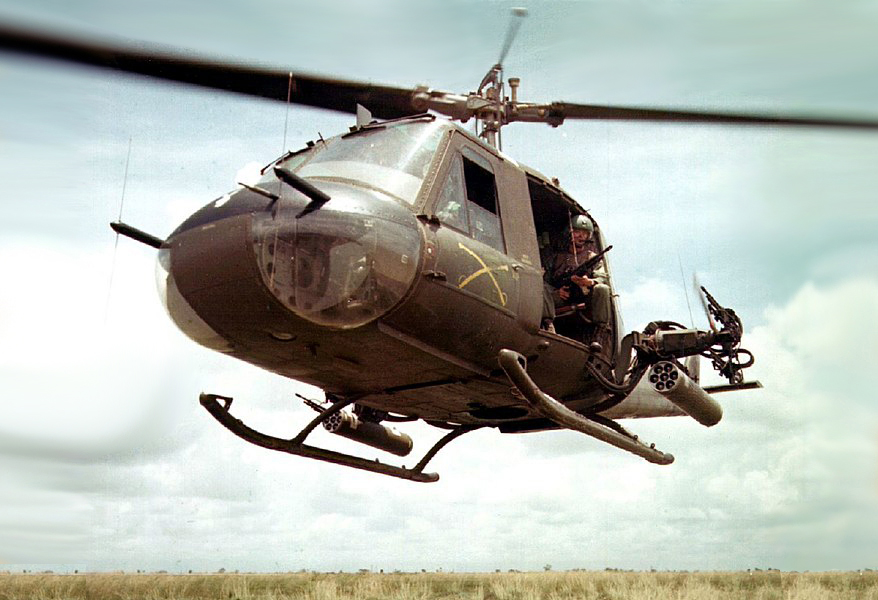
A Bell UH-1B gunship in Vietnam

- Aérospatiale SA319 Alouette III
- Aérospatiale SA 330 Puma
- Boeing ACH-47 Chinook
- Bell UH-1B/C/M
- Mil Mi-24
- HAL Rudra
- HAL Lancer
- HAL Prachand
- Sikorsky MH-60L DAP
- Z-9WA

== See also ==
- Counter-insurgency aircraft
