= List of Irish-American Medal of Honor recipients =

The following is a list of Irish-American soldiers, sailors, airmen and Marines who were awarded the American military's highest decoration — the Medal of Honor. The Medal of Honor is bestowed "for conspicuous gallantry and intrepidity at the risk of life, above and beyond the call of duty, in actual combat against an armed enemy force." The medal is awarded by the President of the United States on behalf of the Congress.

Of the 3,464 Medals of Honor awarded as of September 17, 2009, an estimated 2,021 (58%) have been awarded to Irish-American recipients, more than twice the number awarded any other ethnic group; 257 Irish-born Americans have received the Medal of Honor which represents more than half of foreign-born MOH recipients. A monument to these Irish-born Medal of Honor recipients is located at Valley Forge's Medal of Honor Grove; erected by the Ancient Order of Hibernians. The first Irish American to receive the Medal was Michael Madden, who received it for his actions in the American Civil War (Note that the earliest action for which the Medal of Honor was awarded was to Irish American U.S. Army Assistant Surgeon Bernard J.D. Irwin for the engagement at Apache Pass, February 1861. The award was made three decades after the event and after Madden's award).

== Medal of Honor ==
The Medal of Honor was created during the American Civil War and is the highest military decoration presented by the United States government to a member of its armed forces. The recipient must have distinguished themselves at the risk of their own life above and beyond the call of duty in action against an enemy of the United States. Due to the nature of this medal, it is commonly presented posthumously.

== Civil War ==
This along with the *, indicates that the Medal of Honor was awarded posthumously
This indicates that the recipient was born in Ireland

Image	Name	Service	Rank	Unit	Place of action	Date of action	Notes
—	Christopher C. Bruton	Army	Captain	Company C, 22nd New York Cavalry	Waynesboro, Virginia	March 2, 1865	Awarded March 26, 1865. Citation: Capture of Gen. Early's headquarters flag. Confederate national standard.
—	James Allen	Army	Private		South Mountain, Maryland	September 14, 1862	Single-handed and slightly wounded he accosted a squad of 14 Confederate soldiers bearing the colors of the 16th Georgia Infantry (C.S.A.).
—	Robert Anderson	Navy	Quartermaster		On board USS Crusader and USS Keokuk	1863	Served on board USS Crusader and USS Keokuk during various actions of those vessels.
—	Augustus Barry	Army	Sergeant Major		Unknown	1863 – 1865	Gallantry in various actions during the rebellion.
—	David L. Bass	Navy	Seaman		Fort Fisher, North Carolina	January 15, 1865	On board USS Minnesota in action during the assault on Fort Fisher, 15 January 1865.
—	William R. D. Blackwood	Army	Surgeon		Petersburg, Virginia	April 2, 1865	Removed severely wounded officers and soldiers from the field while under a heavy fire from the enemy, exposing himself beyond the call of duty, thus furnishing an example of most distinguished gallantry.
Profile of a balding white man with bushy, drooping mustache wearing an ornate military jacket with shoulder boards, shoulder cords, and a lanyard hanging from the chest.	John Gregory Bourke	Army	Private	Company E, 15th Pennsylvania Cavalry	Murfreesboro, Tennessee	December 31, 1862 – January 2, 1863	Gallantry in action.
—	James Brady	Army	Private		Battle of Chaffin's Farm, Virginia	Sep 29, 1864	Capture of flag
—	Felix Brannigan	Army	Private		Battle of Chancellorsville, Virginia	May 2, 1863	Volunteered on a dangerous service and brought in valuable information.
—	John Brosnan	Army	Sergeant	Company E, 164th New York Infantry	Second Battle of Petersburg, Virginia	Jun 17, 1864	Rescued a wounded comrade who lay exposed to the enemy's fire, receiving a severe wound in the effort.
—	Denis Buckley	Army	Private		Battle of Peachtree Creek, Ga.	Jul 20, 1864	Capture of flag of 31st Mississippi (C.S.A.).
—	John C. Buckley	Army	Sergeant		Battle of Vicksburg, Miss.	May 22, 1863	Gallantry in the charge of the "volunteer storming party."
—	E. Michael Burk	Army	Private		Battle of Spotsylvania Court House, Virginia	May 12, 1864	Capture of flag, seizing it as his regiment advanced over the enemy's works. He received a bullet wound in the chest while capturing flag.
—	Thomas Burk	Army	Sergeant		Battle of Wilderness	May 6, 1864	At the risk of his own life went back while the rebels were still firing and, finding Col. Wheelock unable to move, alone and unaided, carried him off the field of battle.
—	Daniel W. Burke	Army	First Sergeant		Battle of Shepherdstown, Virginia	Sep 20, 1862	Voluntarily attempted to spike a gun in the face of the enemy.
—	John H. Callahan	Army	Private		Battle of Fort Blakeley, Ala.	Apr 9, 1865	Capture of flag.
—	William Campbell	Army	Private		Vicksburg, Mississippi	May 22, 1863	Gallantry in the charge of the "volunteer storming party."
—	Hugh Carey	Army	Sergeant	82nd New York Infantry	Battle of Gettysburg, Pa.	Jul 2, 1863	Captured the flag of the 7th Virginia Infantry (C.S.A.), being twice wounded in the effort.
—	Patrick Colbert	Navy	Coxswain		Aboard USS Commodore Hull	October 31, 1864	Served on board USS Commodore Hull at the capture of Plymouth, 31 October 1864
—	Charles H. T. Collis	Army	Colonel		Petersburg, Virginia	December 13, 1862	Gallantly led his regiment in battle at a critical moment.
	Martin T. Conboy	Army	Second Lieutenant		Williamsburg, Virginia	May 5, 1862	Battle of Williamsburg Took command of the company in action, the captain having been wounded, the other commissioned officers being absent, and handled it with skill and bravery
—	Dennis Conlan	Navy	Seaman		Aboard USS Agawam, First Battle of Fort Fisher	December 23, 1864	Conlan served on board USS Agawam, as one of a volunteer crew of a powder boat which was exploded near Fort Fisher, 23 December 1864.
—	Thomas Connor	Navy	Ordinary Seaman		Fort Fisher, North Carolina	January 15, 1865	On board USS Minnesota, in action during the assault on Fort Fisher, 15 January 1865.
—	James Connors	Army	Private		Battle of Fisher's Hill, Virginia	September 22, 1864	Capture of enemy flag.
—	John L. M. Cooper	Navy	Coxswain		Mobile Bay, Alabama; Mobile, Alabama	August 5, 1864; April 26, 1865	Double MOH recipient
—	John Corcoran	Army	Private		Third Battle of Petersburg, Virginia	Apr 2, 1865	Was one of a detachment of 20 picked artillerymen who voluntarily accompanied an infantry assaulting party, and who turned upon the enemy the guns captured in the assault.
Head of a white man with a drooping mustache and short hair, wearing a dark suit over a light-colored shirt and tie. The portrait is surrounded by a shield-shaped decorative frame.	Thomas E. Corcoran	Navy	Landman		Vicksburg, Mississippi	May 27, 1863	Served on board USS Cincinnati during the attack on the Vicksburg batteries and at the time of her sinking
—	John Creed	Army	Private		Battle of Fisher's Hill, Virginia	September 22, 1864	Capture of the enemy flag.
A white man with a mustache standing with his left arm resting on an object to his side and his right hand inside his jacket. A star-shaped medal is hanging from a ribbon on his left breast.	Cornelius Cronin	Navy	Chief Quartermaster		Aboard USS Richmond, Battle of Mobile Bay	August 5, 1864	On board USS Richmond in action at Mobile Bay on 5 August 1864
—	Richard J. Curran	Army	Assistant Surgeon		Antietam, Maryland	September 17, 1862	Voluntarily exposed himself to great danger by going to the fighting line there succoring the wounded and helpless and conducting them to the field hospital.
—	Michael Dougherty	Army	Private		Jefferson, Virginia	Oct 12, 1863	At the head of a detachment of his company dashed across an open field, exposed to a deadly fire from the enemy, and succeeded in dislodging them from an unoccupied house, which he and his comrades defended for several hours against repeated attacks, thus preventing the enemy from flanking the position of the Union forces.
—	Patrick Dougherty	Navy	Landsman		Aboard USS Lackawanna, Battle of Mobile Bay	August 5, 1864	As a landsman on board USS Lackawanna, Dougherty acted gallantly without orders when the powder box at his gun was disabled under the heavy enemy fire, and maintained a supply of powder throughout the prolonged action. Dougherty also aided in the attacks on Fort Morgan and in the capture of the prize ram Tennessee.
—	Edmund English	Army	First Sergeant		Wilderness, Virginia	May 6, 1864	During a rout and while under orders to retreat seized the colors, rallied the men, and drove the enemy back.
—	Thomas T. Fallon	Army	Private		Williamsburg, Virginia	May 1862 and Jun 1864	At Williamsburg, Virginia, assisted in driving rebel skirmishers to their main line. Participated in action, at Fair Oaks, Virginia, though excused from duty because of disability. In a charge with his company at Big Shanty, Georgia, was the first man on the enemy's works.
—	Thomas Fitzpatrick	Navy	Coxswain		Aboard USS Hartford, Battle of Mobile Bay	August 5, 1864	As captain of the No. 1 gun on board the flagship USS Hartford, during action against rebel gunboats, the ram Tennessee and Fort Morgan in Mobile Bay, 5 August 1864.
—	Augustin Flanagan	Army	Sergeant		Battle of Chaffin's Farm, Virginia	Sep 29, 1864	Gallantry in the charge on the enemy's works: rushing forward with the colors and calling upon the men to follow him; was severely wounded.
—	James Flannigan	Army	Private		Nolensville, Tenn.	Feb 15, 1863	Was one of a detachment of 16 men who heroically defended a wagon train against the attack of 125 cavalry, repulsed the attack and saved the train.
—	Christopher Flynn	Army	Corporal	14th Connecticut Infantry	Battle of Gettysburg, Pa.	Jul 3, 1863	Capture of flag of 52d North Carolina Infantry (C.S.A.).
—	James E. Flynn	Army	Sergeant		Battle of Vicksburg, Miss.	May 22, 1863	Gallantry in the charge of the "volunteer storming party."
Head of a white man with a bushy mustache wearing a dark suit and bow tie. The portrait is surrounded by an oval-shaped frame decorated with stars and stripes.	Michael C. Horgan	Navy	Landman		Plymouth, North Carolina	October 31, 1864	"[D]istinguished himself by a display of coolness when he participated in landing and spiking a 9-inch gun while under a devastating fire from enemy musketry."
—	Samuel B. Horne	Army	Captain		Fort Harrison, Virginia	September 29, 1864	While acting as an aide and carrying an important message, was severely wounded and his horse killed but delivered the order and rejoined his general.
—	Michael Hudson	Marine Corps	Sergeant		Mobile Bay, Alabama	August 5, 1864	On board USS Brooklyn during action against rebel forts and gunboats and with the ram Tennessee in Mobile Bay, 5 August 1864
—	Thomas R. Kerr	Army	Captain		Moorefield, West Virginia	August 7, 1864	After being most desperately wounded, he captured the colors of the 8th Virginia Cavalry (C.S.A.).
—	Edward M. Knox	Army	Second Lieutenant		Gettysburg, Pennsylvania	Jul 2, 1863	Held his ground with the battery after the other batteries had fallen back until compelled to draw his piece off by hand; he was severely wounded.
—	Bartlett Laffey	Navy	Seaman		Yazoo City, Mississippi	March 5, 1864	Served on board USS Marmora off Yazoo City, Mississippi, 5 March 1864. Landed ashore with his howitzer gun and crew in the midst of battle and contributed to the turning back of the enemy.
—	Hugh Logan	Navy	Captain of the Forecastle		Mobile Bay, Alabama	December 30, 1862	On board USS Rhode Island which was engaged in rescuing men from the stricken Monitor in Mobile Bay, on 30 December 1862.
—	John Lonergan	Army	Captain	13th Vermont Infantry	Gettysburg, Pennsylvania	July 2, 1863	Gallantry in the recapture of four guns and the capture of two additional guns from the enemy; also the capture of a number of prisoners.
—	Michael Madden	Army	Private		Mason's Island, Maryland	September 3, 1861	Assisted a wounded comrade to the riverbank and, under heavy fire of the enemy, swam with him across a branch of the Potomac to the Union lines.
—	Richard C. Mangam	Army	Private		Battle of Hatcher's Run, Virginia	April 2, 1865	Capture of flag of 8th Mississippi Infantry (C.S.A.)
—	James Martin II	Marine Corps	Sergeant		Mobile Bay, Alabama	August 5, 1864	Despite damage to his ship and the loss of several men on board as enemy fire raked her decks, Sgt. Martin fought his gun with skill and courage throughout the furious two-hour battle which resulted in the surrender of the rebel ram Tennessee and in the damaging and destruction of batteries at Fort Morgan.
—	Peter McAdams	Army	Corporal		Salem Heights, Virginia	May 3, 1863	Went 250 yards in front of his regiment toward the position of the enemy and under fire brought within the lines a wounded and unconscious comrade.
—	Charles McAnally	Army	Second Lieutenant		Spotsylvania County, Virginia	May 12, 1864	In a hand-to-hand encounter with the enemy captured a flag, was wounded in the act, but continued on duty until he received a second wound.
—	Patrick H. McEnroe	Army	Sergeant		Winchester, Virginia	September 19, 1864	Capture of colors of 36th Virginia Infantry (C.S.A.).
—	Martin McHugh	Navy	Seaman		Aboard USS Cincinnati, Operations against Vicksburg	May 27, 1863	Serving on board USS Cincinnati during the attack on the Vicksburg batteries and at the time of her sinking, 27 May 1863.
Framed portrait of a white man with a very long beard, neatly trimmed hair, and a dark jacket.	Hugh Molloy	Navy	Ordinary Seaman		Harrisonburg, Louisiana	March 2, 1864	Served on board USS Fort Hindman during the engagement near Harrisonburg, Louisiana, 2 March 1864.
—	Patrick Monaghan	Army	Corporal		Second Battle of Petersburg, Virginia	Jun 17, 1864	Recapture of colors of 7th New York Heavy Artillery.
—	John G. Morrison	Navy	Coxswain		On board USS Carondelet	July 15, 1862	Serving as coxswain on board USS Carondelet, Morrison was commended for meritorious conduct in general and especially for his heroic conduct and his inspiring example to the crew in the engagement with the rebel ram Arkansas, Yazoo River, 15 July 1862.
Portrait of a white man with wavy hair and a long, forked beard, wearing a suit.	St. Clair A. Mulholland	Army	Major		Chancellorsville, Virginia	May 4–5, 1863	In command of the picket line held the enemy in check all night to cover the retreat of the Army.
—	Dennis Murphy	Army	Sergeant		Corinth, Mississippi	October 3, 1862	Although wounded three times, carried the colors throughout the conflict.
—	Michael C. Murphy	Army	Lieutenant Colonel		Battle of North Anna, Virginia	May 24, 1864	This officer, commanding the regiment, kept it on the field exposed to the fire of the enemy for three hours without being able to fire one shot in return because of the ammunition being exhausted.
—	Christopher Nugent	Marine Corps	Sergeant		On board USS Fort Henry	June 15, 1863	For his actions while serving on board USS Fort Henry, Crystal River, Florida, 15 June 1863.
—	James R. O'Beirne	Army	Captain		Battle of Seven Pines, Virginia	May 31-June 1, 1862	Gallantly maintained the line of battle until ordered to fall back.
—	Henry D. O'Brien	Army	Corporal		Battle of Gettysburg, Pa.	Jul 3, 1863	Taking up the colors where they had fallen, he rushed ahead of his regiment, close to the muzzles of the enemy's guns, and engaged in the desperate struggle in which the enemy was defeated, and though severely wounded, he held the colors until wounded a second time.
—	Oliver O'Brien	Navy	Coxswain		Aboard the USS John Adams	November 28, 1864	Served as coxswain on board the U.S. Sloop John Adams, Sullvan's Island Channel, 28 November 1864. Taking part in the boarding of the blockade runner Beatrice while under heavy enemy fire from Fort Moultrie, O'Brien, who was in charge of one of the boarding launches, carried out his duties with prompt and energetic conduct. This action resulted in the firing of the Beatrice and the capture of a quantity of supplies from her.
—	Peter O'Brien	Army	Private		Battle of Waynesboro, Virginia	Mar 2, 1865	Capture of flag and of a Confederate officer with his horse and equipment
—	Thomas O'Connell	Navy		Coal Heaver	Aboard the USS Hartford, Battle of Mobile Bay	Aug 5, 1864	On board the flagship USS Hartford, during successful attacks against Fort Morgan, rebel gunboats and the ram Tennessee in Mobile Bay on 5 August 1864.
—	Timothy O'Connor	Army	Private		Unknown	Unknown	Date and place of act not of record in War Department.
—	John O'Dea	Army	Private		Vicksburg, Mississippi	May 22, 1863	Gallantry in the charge of the "volunteer storming party"
—	Menomen O'Donnell	Army	First Lieutenant		Battle of Vicksburg, Mississippi and Fort DeRussey, La.	May 22, 1863 and Mar 14, 1864	Voluntarily joined the color guard in the assault on the enemy's works when he saw indications of wavering and caused the colors of his regiment to be planted on the parapet. Voluntarily placed himself in the ranks of an assaulting column (being then on staff duty) and rode with it into the enemy's works, being the only mounted officer present, was twice wounded in battle.
—	Timothy O'Donoghue	Navy	Seaman		Aboard USS Signal, Red River Campaign	May 5, 1864	Served as boatswain's mate on board USS Signal, Red River, 5 May 1864.
—	Stephen O'Neill	Army	Corporal		Battle of Chancellorsville, Virginia	May 1, 1863	Took up the colors from the hands of the color bearer who had been shot down and bore them through the remainder of the battle.
—	George C. Platt	Army	Private		Fairfield, Pennsylvania	July 3, 1863	Seized the regimental flag upon the death of the standard bearer in a hand-to-hand fight and prevented it from falling into the hands of the enemy.
—	Thomas Plunkett	Army	Sergeant		Fredericksburg, Virginia	December 11, 1862	Seized the colors of his regiment, the color bearer having been shot down, and bore them to the front where both his arms were carried off by a shell.
Head and shoulders of a white man with a drooping mustache, wearing a cavalry hat and a double-breasted military jacket with two medals pinned to the left breast.	James Quinlan	Army	Major		Savage's Station, Virginia	June 29, 1862	Led his regiment on the enemy's battery, silenced the guns, held the position against overwhelming numbers, and covered the retreat of the 2d Army Corps.
—	John Rannahan	Marine Corps	Corporal		Fort Fisher, North Carolina	January 15, 1865	On board USS Minnesota in the assault on Fort Fisher, 15 January 1865.
—	George Reynolds	Army	Private		Winchester, Virginia	September 19, 1864	Capture of Virginia State flag.
—	James S. Roantree	Marine Corps	Sergeant		Mobile Bay, Alabama	August 5, 1864	On board USS Oneida during action against rebel forts and gunboats and with the ram Tennessee in Mobile Bay, 5 August 1864.
—	Peter J. Ryan	Army	Private		Winchester, Virginia	September 19, 1864	With one companion, captured 14 Confederates in the severest part of the battle.
—	George Schutt	Navy	Coxswain		St. Marks, Florida	March 5–6, 1865	
—	William J. Sewell	Army	Colonel		Chancellorsville, Virginia	May 3, 1863	For assuming command of the brigade, rallying the troops, and remaining in command though wounded.
—	William Smith	Navy	Quartermaster		On board USS Kearsarge	January 15, 1865	Served as second quartermaster on board USS Kearsarge when she destroyed Alabama off Cherbourg, France, 19 June 1864.
—	James Sullivan	Navy	Ordinary Seaman		Battle of Fort Fisher, North Carolina	December 2, 1864	On board USS Agawam as one of a volunteer crew of a powder boat which was exploded near Fort Fisher, 2 December 1864.
—	John Sullivan	Navy	Seaman		USS Monticello	Jun 23, 1864 – Jun 25, 1864	Served as seaman on board USS Monticello during the reconnaissance of the harbor and water defenses of Wilmington, North Carolina 23 to 25 June 1864.
—	Timothy Sullivan	Navy	Coxswain		USS Louisville	Various	Served on board USS Louisville during various actions of that vessel. During the engagements of Louisville, Sullivan served as first captain of a 9-inch gun and throughout his period of service was "especially commended for his attention to duty, bravery, and coolness in action."
—	John M. Tobin	Army	First Lieutenant		Malvern Hill, Virginia	July 1, 1862	Voluntarily took command of the 9th Massachusetts while adjutant, bravely fighting from 3 p.m. until dusk, rallying and re-forming the regiment under fire; twice picked up the regimental flag, the color bearer having been shot down, and placed it in worthy hands.
—	John Walsh	Army	Corporal		Battle of Cedar Creek, Virginia	October 19, 1864	Recaptured the flag of the 15th New Jersey Infantry.
—	Thomas M. Wells	Army	Chief Bugler		Battle of Cedar Creek, Virginia	October 19, 1864	Capture of colors of 44th Georgia Infantry (C.S.A.).
—	Edward Welsh	Army	Private		Vicksburg, Mississippi	May 22, 1863	Gallantry in the charge of the "volunteer storming party."
—	James Welsh	Army	Private		Battle of the Crater, Petersburg, Virginia	Jul 30, 1864	Bore off the regimental colors after the color sergeant had been wounded and the color corporal bearing the colors killed thereby saving the colors from capture.
—	Patrick H. White	Army	Captain		Vicksburg, Mississippi	May 22, 1863	Carried with others by hand a cannon up to and fired it through an embrasure of the enemy's works.

== Indian Wars ==
This indicates that the recipient was born in Ireland

Image	Name	Service	Rank	Unit	Place of action	Date of action	Notes
—	Richard Barrett	Army	First Sergeant	Company A, 1st U.S. Cavalry	Sycamore Canyon, Arizona	May 23, 1872	Conspicuous gallantry in a charge upon the Tonto Apaches.
—	James J. Bell	Army	Private		Big Horn, Montana	July 9, 1876	
—	Thomas Boyne	Army	Sergeant	Company C, 9th U.S. Cavalry	Mimbres Mountains, N. Mex. and Cuchillo Negro River near Ojo Caliente, New Mexico	May 29, 1879 and Sep 27, 1879	Bravery in action.
—	Edward Branagan	Army	Private	Company F, 4th U.S. Cavalry	Red River, Texas	Sep 29, 1872	"Gallantry in action."
—	James Brogan	Army	Sergeant	Company G, 6th U.S. Cavalry	Simon Valley, Arizona	Dec 14, 1877	Engaged singlehanded 2 renegade Indians until his horse was shot under him and then pursued them so long as he was able.
—	James Brophy	Army	Private	Company B, 8th U.S. Cavalry	Arizona	1868	Bravery in scouts and actions against Indians.
—	James Brown	Army	Sergeant	Company F, 5th U.S. Cavalry	Davidson Canyon near Camp Crittenden, Arizona	Aug 27, 1872	In command of a detachment of 4 men defeated a superior force.
—	Patrick J. Burke	Army	Farrier	Company B, 8th U.S. Cavalry	Arizona	1868	Bravery in scouts and actions against Indians.
—	Richard Burke	Army	Private	Company G, 5th U.S. Infantry	Cedar Creek, etc., Montana	Oct 1876 – Jan 1877	Gallantry in engagements.
	Edmond Butler	Army	Captain	Company C, 5th U.S. Infantry	Wolf Mountains, Montana	January 8, 1877	Most distinguished gallantry in action with hostile Indians.
—	Denis Byrne	Army	Sergeant	Company G, 5th U.S. Infantry	Cedar Creek, Montana	October 1876 – January 1877	Gallantry in engagements.
—	Thomas J. Callan	Army	Private	Company B, 7th US Cavalry	Little Bighorn, Montana	June 25–26, 1876	Displayed conspicuously good conduct in assisting to drive away the Indians; Surname misspelled "Callen" on citation
—	John Connor	Army	Corporal		Near Wichita River, Texas	July 12, 1870	
—	William Evans	Army	Private		Big Horn, Montana	July 9, 1876	
—	Daniel Farren	Army	Private		Arizona Territory	August – October 1868	
—	James Fegan	Army	Sergeant		Near Plum Creek, Kansas	March 1868	
—	John H. Foley	Army	Sergeant		Near Platte River, Nebraska	April 26, 1872	
—	Nicholas Foran	Army	Private		Arizona Territory	August – October 1868	
—	Patrick Golden	Army	Sergeant		Arizona Territory	August – October 1868	
—	Henry Hogan	Army	First Sergeant		Cedar Creek, Montana; Bear Paw Mountains, Montana	October 1876 – January 8, 1877; September 30, 1877	Double MOH recipient
—	Bernard J. D. Irwin	Army	Assistant Surgeon		Apache Pass, Arizona	February 13–14, 1861	
—	John Keenan	Army	Private		Arizona Territory	August – October 1868	
—	Patrick J. Leonard	Army	Sergeant		Little Blue, Nebraska	May 15, 1870	
—	Patrick T. Leonard	Army	Corporal		Near Fort Hartsuff, Nebraska	April 26, 1876	
—	John McHugh	Army	Private	Company A, 5th U.S. Infantry	Cedar Creek, etc., Montana	Oct 21, 1876 – Jan 8, 1877	"Gallantry in action"
—	William McNamara	Army	First Sergeant	Red River, Texas	Sep 29, 1872	Company F, 4th US Cavalry	"Gallantry in action."
—	John Nihill	Army	Private		Whetstone Mountains, Arizona	July 13, 1872	
—	Richard J. Nolan	Army	Farrier		White Clay Creek, South Dakota	December 30, 1890	
—	Moses Orr	Army	Private			Winter of 1872/1873	
—	John F. O'Sullivan	Army	Private		Staked Plains, Texas	December 8, 1874	
—	William R. Parnell	Army	First Lieutenant		White Bird Canyon, Idaho	June 17, 1877	
—	Patrick Rogan	Army	Sergeant		Big Hole, Montana	August 9, 1877	
—	Edward Rooney	Army	Private	Company D, 5th US Infantry	Cedar Creek, etc., Montana	Oct 21, 1876 – Jan 8, 1877	"Gallantry in action."
—	David Ryan	Army	Private	Company G, 5th US Infantry	Cedar Creek, etc., Montana	Oct 21, 1876 – Jan 8, 1877	"Gallantry in action."
—	Dennis Ryan	Army	First Sergeant	Company I, 6th US Cavalry	Gageby Creek, Indian Territory	Dec 2, 1874	Courage while in command of a detachment.
—	Thomas Sullivan	Army	Private	Company E, 7th US Cavalry	Wounded Knee Creek, South Dakota	Dec 29, 1890	Conspicuous bravery in action against Indians concealed in a ravine.
	Bernard Taylor	Army	Sergeant	Company A, 5th US Cavalry	Near Sunset Pass, Arizona	Nov 1, 1874	Bravery in rescuing Lt. King, 5th U.S. Cavalry, from Indians.
—	John Tracy	Army	Private		Chiricahua Mountains, Arizona	October 20, 1869	Born as Henry G. Nabers

== Korean Expedition ==
This indicates that the recipient was born in Ireland

Image	Name	Service	Rank	Unit	Place of action	Date of action	Notes
—	John Coleman	Marine Corps	Private		On board USS Colorado	June 11, 1871	
—	James Dougherty	Marine Corps	Private		Korea	June 11, 1871	
—	Patrick H. Grace	Navy	Chief Quartermaster		On board USS Benicia	June 10, 1871 – June 11, 1871	
—	Michael McNamara	Marine Corps	Private		On board USS Benicia	June 11, 1871	

== Spanish–American War ==
This indicates that the recipient was born in Ireland

Image	Name	Service	Rank	Unit	Place of action	Date of action	Notes
Head and torso of a young black man wearing a suit and tie with a watch chain hanging from a jacket button. He has a cap pushed high up on his forehead and tilted over his left ear.	Dennis Bell	Army	Private		Battle of Tayacoba, Cuba	Jun 30, 1898	Voluntarily went ashore in the face of the enemy and aided in the rescue of his wounded comrades; this after several previous attempts at rescue had been frustrated.
—	George F. Brady	Navy	Chief Gunner's Mate		Cardenas, Cuba	May 11, 1898	
—	Thomas Cavanaugh	Navy	Fireman First Class		Bahamas	November 14, 1898	
—	Thomas C. Cooney	Navy	Chief Machinist		Cardenas, Cuba	May 11, 1898	
—	Thomas M. Doherty	Army	Corporal		Santiago de Cuba	July 1, 1898	
—	John Fitzgerald	Marine Corps	Private		Cuzco, Cuba	June 14, 1898	
—	Philip Gaughan	Marine Corps	Sergeant		Cienfuegos, Cuba	May 11, 1898	
—	Michael Gibbons	Navy	Oiler		Cienfuegos, Cuba	May 11, 1898	
—	George H. Nee	Army	Private		Santiago, Cuba	June 22, 1899	
—	Michael Kearney	Marine Corps	Private		Cienfuegos, Cuba	May 11, 1898	
—	Thomas Kelly	Army	Private		Santiago de Cuba	July 1, 1898	
—	John Maxwell	Navy	Fireman Second Class		Cienfuegos, Cuba	May 11, 1898	
—	Daniel Montague	Navy	Chief Master-at-arms		Santiago de Cuba	June 2, 1898	
—	John E. Murphy	Navy	Coxswain		Santiago de Cuba	June 2, 1898	
—	Edward Sullivan	Marine Corps	Corporal		Cienfuegos, Cuba	May 11, 1898	

== Philippine-American War ==
This with the * indicates that the Medal of Honor was awarded posthumously
This indicates that the recipient was born in Ireland

Image	Name	Service	Rank	Unit	Place of action	Date of action	Notes
—	Bernard A. Byrne	Army	Captain	6th U.S. Infantry	Bobong, Negros	July 19, 1899	Rallied his men on the bridge after the line had been broken and pushed back.
—	Cornelius J. Leahy*	Army	Private	Company A, 36th Infantry, U.S. Volunteers	Luzon, Philippines	September 3, 1899	"Distinguished gallantry in action in driving off a superior force and with the assistance of 1 comrade brought from the field of action the bodies of 2 comrades, 1 killed and the other severely wounded, this while on a scout."
—	Thomas F. Prendergast	Marine Corps	Corporal		Luzon, Philippines	March 25, 1899 – March 29, 1899 and April 5, 1899	"For distinguished conduct in the presence of the enemy in battle"
—	Patrick Shanahan	Navy	Chief Boatswain's Mate		Philippines	May 28, 1899	

== Boxer Rebellion ==
This indicates that the recipient was born in Ireland

Image	Name	Service	Rank	Unit	Place of action	Date of action	Notes
—	James Cooney	Marine Corps	Private		Tientsin, China	July 13, 1900	
	Daniel Daly	Marine Corps	Private	15th Company of Marines	Peking, China	July 19, 1901	Double MOH recipient
Head of a white man with brown hair and a drooping mustache wearing a blue military jacket. The man is looking off to the side.	Alexander J. Foley	Marine Corps	Sergeant		near Tianjin, China	Jul 13, 1900	"[For] distinguishing himself by meritorious conduct"
—	Martin Hunt	Marine Corps	Private		Beijing, China	June 20, 1900 – July 16, 1900	
—	Joseph Killackey	Navy	Landman		China	June 13, 1900 – June 22, 1900	

== United States occupation of Haiti ==
Image	Name	Service	Rank	Unit	Place of action	Date of action	Notes
	Daniel Daly	Marine Corps	Gunnery Sergeant	15th Company of Marines	near Fort Liberte, Haiti	October 24, 1916	Double MOH recipient

== World War I ==
This with the * indicates that the Medal of Honor was awarded posthumously
This indicates that the recipient was born in Ireland

Image	Name	Service	Rank	Unit	Place of action	Date of action	Notes
Three-quarters shot of a middle-aged man in a plain military uniform, standing almost at attention. He is wearing a campaign hat and two medals on his chest.	Michael A. Donaldson	Army	Sergeant		Sommerance-Landres-et-Saint-Georges Road, France	Oct 14, 1918	Rescued six wounded men despite intense fire
Head and shoulders of an older man with neatly combed and parted gray hair wearing a suit and tie.	William J. Donovan	Army	Lieutenant Colonel		near Landres-et-Saint-Georges, France	Oct 14, 1918 – Oct 15, 1918	Exposed himself to fire in order to lead and organize his men, remained with them after being wounded
	Richard W. O'Neill	Army	Sergeant		on the Ourcq River, France	Jul 30, 1918	Continued to lead an attack despite being repeatedly wounded
	Michael J. Perkins*	Army	Private First Class		Belleu Bois, France	Oct 27, 1918	Singly-handedly attacked and captured a pillbox
Head and shoulders of a middle-aged man, with receding hairline, in a dark turtleneck sweater.	Joseph H. Thompson	Army	Major		Apremont, France	October 1, 1918	

== World War II ==
This with the * indicates that the Medal of Honor was awarded posthumously
This indicates that the recipient was born in Ireland

Image	Name	Service	Rank	Unit	Place of action	Date of action	Notes
—	Frank Burke	Army	First Lieutenant		Nuremberg, Germany	April 17, 1945	Also known as Francis X. Burke.
Head and shoulders of a man in a white jacket with black shoulderboards with binoculars hanging from around his neck. His eyes are shaded by a white peaked cap with a black visor.	Daniel J. Callaghan*	Navy	Rear Admiral		Naval Battle of Guadalcanal, Savo Island	November 12, 1942 – November 13, 1942	
—	Robert Craig*	Army	Second Lieutenant		near Favoratta, Sicily	July 11, 1943	
—	Michael J. Daly	Army	First Lieutenant		Nuremberg, Germany	April 18, 1945	
—	Charles E. Kelly	Army	Corporal		near Altavilla, Italy	September 13, 1943	
black and white headshot of Joseph McCarthy in his military uniform	Joseph J. McCarthy	Marine Corps Reserve	Captain	2nd Battalion, 24th Marine Regiment, 4th Marine Division	Iwo Jima	February 21, 1945	Risked his life to eliminate several enemy troops so his men could move forward
	Thomas B. McGuire, Jr.*	Army Air Forces	Major		over Luzon, Philippine Islands	December 25, 1944 – December 26, 1944	The second leading air ace in World War II before being killed in action in January 1945. McGuire Air Force Base is named for him.
	Audie L. Murphy	Army	Second Lieutenant		near Holtzwihr, France	January 26, 1945	Highest number of decorations for US combatant.
—	William J. O'Brien*	Army	Lieutenant Colonel		Saipan, Marianas Islands	June 20, 1944 – July 7, 1944	
	Joseph T. O'Callahan	Navy	Commander		near Kobe, Japan	March 19, 1945	Chaplain aboard aircraft carrier USS Franklin.
	Edward H. O'Hare	Navy	Lieutenant		off Papua New Guinea	February 20, 1942	O'Hare International Airport in Chicago was named in his memory.
	Richard H. O'Kane	Navy	Commander	Charles Shea (see the Wikipedia entry in his name	Philippine Islands	October 23, 1944 – October 24, 1944	For submarine operations against two Japanese convoys.
	Kenneth A. Walsh	Marine Corps	First Lieutenant		Solomon Islands area	August 15, 1943 and August 30, 1943	

== Korean War ==
This with the * indicates that the Medal of Honor was awarded posthumously
This indicates that the recipient was born in Ireland

Image	Name	Service	Rank	Unit	Place of action	Date of action	Notes
	Thomas J. Hudner, Jr.	Navy	Lieutenant, Junior Grade	Fighter Squadron 32, attached to USS Leyte	Battle of Chosin Reservoir, Korea	December 4, 1950	Risked his life to rescue a downed pilot
	Raymond G. Murphy	USMCR	Second Lieutenant	Company A, 1st Battalion, 5th Marines, 1st Marine Division (Rein.)	Korea	February 3, 1953	Although wounded he refused medical care to fight the enemy until all his men and casualties had been taken care of.
	George H. O'Brien, Jr.	USMCR	Second Lieutenant	Company H, 3rd Battalion, 7th Marines, 1st Marine Division (Rein.)	Korea	October 27, 1952	Provided cover and care for wounded while his unit was attacking the enemy

== Vietnam War ==
This with the * indicates that the Medal of Honor was awarded posthumously

Image	Name	Service	Rank	Unit	Place of action	Date of action	Notes
Head and shoulders of a white man with dark hair wearing a military jacket with a round patch on the upper sleeve, and oak leaf emblem atop the shoulder, and ribbon bars and pins on the left breast.	Patrick H. Brady	Army	Major		near Chu Lai, Republic of Vietnam	January 6, 1968	Flew multiple missions against heavy fire to evacuate 51 wounded men
Head and shoulders of a white man with short hair, wearing a military jacket with a star-shaped medal hanging from a ribbon around his neck.	Roger H. C. Donlon	Army	Captain		near Nam Dong, Republic of Vietnam	July 6, 1964	Rescued and administered first aid to several wounded soldiers and led a group to defeat an enemy force causing them to retreat leaving behind 54 of their dead, many weapons, and grenades.
—	Kern W. Dunagan	Army	Captain		Quang Tin Province, Republic of Vietnam	May 13, 1969	Although wounded he directed fire onto enemy positions and rescued several wounded soldiers
Portrait of a middle-aged white man in a formal military uniform in front of a U.S. flag	Robert F. Foley	Army	Captain		near Quan Dau Tieng, Republic of Vietnam	November 5, 1966	Despite his painful wounds he refused medical aid and persevered in the forefront of the attack on the enemy redoubt. He led the assault on several enemy gun emplacements and, single-handedly, destroyed three such positions.
	Thomas G. Kelley	Navy	Lieutenant		Ong Muong Canal, Kien Hoa Province, Republic of Vietnam	June 15, 1969	Successfully relayed commands through one of his men until an enemy attack was silenced and the boats he was leading were able to move to safety
	James McCloughan	Army	Private First Class	United States Army	Battle of Nui Yon Hill, Vietnam	1969	He suffered wounds from shrapnel and small arms fire on three separate occasions, but refused medical evacuation to stay with his unit, and continued to brave enemy fire to rescue, treat, and defend wounded Americans, coming to the aid of his men and fighting the enemy, at one point knocking out an enemy RPG position with a grenade. In all, the Pentagon credits McCloughan with saving the lives of 10 members of his company.
A black and white headshot of a young McMahon wearing a suit and tie. He is turned slightly to the right with his head down and he is smiling.	Thomas J. McMahon*	Army	Specialist Four		Quang Tin Province, Republic of Vietnam	March 19, 1969	While attempting to rescue three wounded soldiers despite heavy enemy fire, he was able to carry two of the men to safety but was killed while trying to rescue the third.
	David H. McNerney	Army	First Sergeant		Polei Doc, Republic of Vietnam	March 22, 1967	Despite being wounded after his unit was attacked, he assumed command of the unit when the company commander was killed, organized the defense, and helped arrange a helicopter evacuation of the wounded. He refused his own medical evacuation and instead stayed with the company until a new commander arrived.
A black and white headshot photo of Noonan in his military dress blue uniform with hat.	Thomas P. Noonan, Jr.*	Marine Corps	Lance Corporal		near Vandergrift Combat Base, A Shau Valley, Republic of Vietnam	February 5, 1969	Killed while attempting to rescue a wounded man
Head and shoulders of a white man with a pointed mustache, wearing a star-shaped medal on a blue ribbon around his neck.	Robert E. O'Malley	Marine Corps	Corporal	Company I, 3rd Battalion 3rd Marines	near An Cu'ong 2, South Vietnam	August 18, 1965	Risked his life and led his men to repeatedly attack the enemy, assist another Marine unit that had inflicted heavy casualties and led his unit to a helicopter for evacuation.
A black and white head shot of Shea in his military dress uniform with hat.	Daniel J. Shea*	Army	Private First Class		Quảng Trị Province, Republic of Vietnam	May 14, 1969	Killed by enemy gunfire after assisting in the defeat of an attacking enemy force
A black and white image showing the head and upper torso of Sijan wearing his military dress uniform with ribbons.	Lance P. Sijan*	Air Force	Captain		North Vietnam	November 9, 1967	For actions while as a prisoner of war
A color image showing Thornton from the waist up in a business suit. He is wearing his Medal of Honor around his neck, with his left hand over his heart.	Michael E. Thornton	Navy	Engineman Second Class		Quảng Trị Province, Republic of Vietnam	October 31, 1972	Saved the life of his superior officer and allowed the other members of his patrol to escape

== War in Afghanistan ==
This with the * indicates that the Medal of Honor was awarded posthumously
This indicates that the recipient was born in Ireland

Image	Name	Service	Rank	Unit	Place of action	Date of action	Notes
Top half of young man in circa 2000 dress U.S. Navy uniform of junior officer.	Michael P. Murphy*	Navy	Lieutenant	SEAL Delivery Vehicle Team 1	Near Asadabad, Kunar Province	June 28, 2005	Led a four-man reconnaissance team in a fight against superior numbers, exposed himself to hostile fire in order to call for help

== War in Iraq ==
This with the * indicates that the Medal of Honor was awarded posthumously

Image	Name	Service	Rank	Unit	Place of action	Date of action	Notes
Head and shoulders of a smiling young man in circa 2000 U.S. Army uniform with beret, before a large American flag.	Ross A. McGinnis*	Army	Specialist	Company C, 1st Battalion, 26th Infantry Regiment, 2nd "Dagger" Brigade Combat Team, 1st Infantry Division	Baghdad, Iraq	June 28, 2005	McGinnis threw himself on enemy grenade to save his team.
Soldier in action in circa 2000 U.S. camouflage battle dress, carrying a combat rifle and wearing sunglasses and helmet. Behind him in the dusty air is a similarly equipped soldier.	Michael A. Monsoor*	Navy	Master at Arms Second Class	SEAL, Delta Platoon, SEAL Team 3	Ramadi, Iraq	June 28, 2005	Monsoor threw himself on enemy grenade to save his team.

== Peacetime ==
This indicates that the recipient was born in Ireland

Image	Name	Service	Rank	Unit	Place of action	Date of action	Notes
—	William Ahern	Navy	Watertender		On board USS Puritan	July 1, 1897	
—	Thomas Cahey	Navy	Seaman		On board USS Petrel	March 31, 1901	
—	John J. Clausey	Navy	Chief Gunner's Mate		USS Bennington, San Diego, California	Jul 21, 1905	For extraordinary heroism when boiler exploded on ship.
—	John Costello	Navy	Ordinary Seaman		USS Hartford, Philadelphia, Pennsylvania	Jul 16, 1876	For rescuing from drowning a landsman of USS Hartford
—	Thomas Cramen	Navy	Boatswain's Mate		On board USS Portsmouth	February 7, 1882	
—	Frank W. Crilley	Navy	Chief Gunner's Mate		wreck site of USS F-4, off Honolulu, Hawaii	Apr 17, 1915	For rescuing a fellow diver who had become tangled in the wreckage and trapped underwater
—	Willie Cronan	Navy	Boatswain's Mate		USS Bennington, San Diego, California	Jul 21, 1905	Bravery shown during ship's boiler explosion
—	John Dempsey	Navy	Seaman		Shanghai, China	January 23, 1875	
—	John Flannagan	Navy	Boatswain's Mate		Le Havre, France	October 26, 1878	
—	Edward Floyd	Navy	Boilermaker		On board USS Iowa	January 25, 1905	
—	Hugh King	Navy	Ordinary Seaman		On board USS Iroquois	September 7, 1871	
	John King	Navy	Watertender		On board USS Vicksburg; On board USS Salem	May 29, 1901; September 13, 1909	Double MOH recipient
Head of a white man wearing a dark suit and bow tie. To the lower right of the oval-shaped portrait is an illustration of a shield covered with stars and stripes, like the American flag, and a ribbon tied around the shield.	Patrick J. Kyle	Navy	Landman		Port Mahon, Menorca	March 13, 1879	
—	John O'Neal	Navy	Boatswain's Mate		Greytown, Nicaragua	April 12, 1872	
—	Patrick Regan	Navy	Ordinary Seaman		Coquimbo, Chile	July 30, 1873	
	Patrick Reid	Navy	Chief Watertender		On board USS North Dakota	September 8, 1910	
—	Thomas Smith	Navy	Seaman		Pará, Brazil	October 1, 1878	
	Thomas Stanton	Navy	Chief Machinist's Mate		On board USS North Dakota	September 8, 1910	
—	James Thayer	Navy	Ship's Corporal		On board USS Constitution	November 16, 1879	
—	Michael Thornton	Navy	Seaman		On board USS Leyden	August 26, 1881	

== See also ==
- List of Medal of Honor recipients
