= James Bell =

James, Jim, Jimmy and Jamie Bell may refer to:

== Arts and entertainment ==
- James Madison Bell (1826–1902), African-American poet, orator, and political activist
- James Bell (actor) (1891–1973), American character actor
- Jimmy Velvit (born 1941), US singer who used the pseudonym James Bell
- Orion (singer) (born James Hughes Bell, 1945–1998), American singer
- Jamie Bell (born 1986), English actor

== Business ==
- James Bell (merchant) (c. 1739–1814), Scottish-born merchant in Canada
- James George Bell (1831–1911), American settler and businessman
- James Ford Bell (1879–1961), American entrepreneur; founder of General Mills
- James A. Bell (born 1948), American business executive; Boeing Chief Financial Officer

== Military ==
- James B. Bell (1835–1910), American soldier and Medal of Honor recipient
- James Bell (soldier, born 1845) (1845–1901), US Army private and Medal of Honor recipient
- J. Franklin Bell (1856–1919), Chief of Staff of the United States Army

== Politicians and government officials ==
- James Martin Bell (1796–1849), U.S. Congressman from Ohio
- James Bell (New Hampshire politician) (1805–1857), American; U.S. Senator
- James A. Bell (New York politician) (1814–?), New York politician
- James Spencer-Bell (1818–1872), known until 1866 as James Bell, MP for Guildford
- James H. Bell (1825–1892), Justice of the Supreme Court of Texas
- James Bell (Australian politician) (1836–1908), Australian businessman and politician, Victorian Legislative Council member 1880–1904
- James W. Bell (d. 1881), deputy sheriff in Lincoln, New Mexico
- Sir James Bell, 1st Baronet (1850–1929), Scottish shipowner and yachtsman, Lord Provost of Glasgow 1892 to 1896
- Sir James Bell (town clerk) (1866–1937), Town Clerk of London, 1902–1935
- James Bell (trade unionist) (1872–1955), English Labour MP for Ormskirk
- James M. Bell (1878–1953), Iowa state legislator and mayor
- James F. Bell (judge) (1915–2005), Democratic lawyer and judge of the Ohio Supreme Court

== Religion ==
- James Bell (priest) (1524–1584), Catholic martyr
- James Bell (reformer) (died 1596), English reformer
- James Bell (bishop) (born 1950), English clergyman

== Science ==
- James Bell (chemist) (1825–1908), Irish chemist
- James Bell (geologist) (1877–1934), Canadian geologist, writer, and company director in New Zealand
- James F. Bell III (born 1965), American scientist

== Sport ==
- James Bell (footballer, born 1866) (1866–?), Scottish footballer (Dumbarton, Celtic and Kilmarnock)
- James Bell (footballer, born 1883) (1883–1962), Middlesbrough, Portsmouth and Exeter City player
- Cool Papa Bell (James Thomas Bell, 1903–1991), American baseball player
- Jim Bell (ice hockey) (died 1998), American ice hockey player and head coach
- Jim Bell (footballer) (1935–2019), footballer who represented New Zealand
- Jay Bell (footballer) (James Bell, born 1989), English footballer
- James Bell (basketball) (born 1992), American basketball player
- James Bell (rugby league) (born 1994), New Zealand rugby league footballer
- James Bell (Australian footballer) (born 1999), Australian rules footballer

== Others ==
- James Bell (geographical writer) (1769–1833), Scottish geographical writer
- James Stanislaus Bell (1797–1858), British adventurer in Circassia
- J. Carleton Bell (1872–1946), American educational psychologist and professor of education
- Jim Bell (born 1958), American crypto-anarchist
- James "Jim" Bell, character in Friday Night Dinner
- James Bell, character in Pure Genius

== See also ==
- James Bell Pettigrew (1832–1908), Scottish anatomist
- Bell (surname)
