= William Ahern =

William or Liam or Bill Ahern may refer to:

- Bill Ahern (footballer, born 1865) (1865–1938), Australian rules footballer for Carlton
- Bill Ahern (footballer, born 1874) (1874–1920), Australian rules footballer for St Kilda
- Liam Ahern (1916–1974), also known as William Ahern, Irish Fianna Fáil politician
- William Ahern (Medal of Honor) (1861–1916), Irish-born American sailor
- Will Ahern (1896–1983), American vaudeville entertainer

== See also ==
- William Ahearn (1858–1919), baseball player
- William Ahearn (born 1946), astronomy benefactor after whom the asteroid 25943 Billahearn is named
