= James Bell (soldier, born 1845) =

US Army soldier (1845–1901)

James Joseph Bell
- Born: July 1, 1845; County Antrim, Ireland
- Died: June 1, 1901 (aged 55); Chicago, Illinois, US
- Burial place: Mount Olivet Cemetery, Chicago
- Military career
- Allegiance: United States of America
- Branch: United States Army
- Service years: 1870–1900
- Rank: Sergeant
- Unit: Company E 7th Infantry
- Conflicts: Indian Wars
- Awards: Medal of Honor

James Joseph Bell (July 1, 1845 – June 1, 1901) was a United States Army soldier who received the Medal of Honor during the Indian Wars. His name is sometimes incorrectly given as James M. Bell.

== Early years ==
James Bell was born in County Antrim, Ireland, in June 1845 (his gravestone says July 1, 1845). He came to the U.S. in 1866, working initially as a laborer. On July 9, 1870, he enlisted in the U.S. Army and was assigned to Company E Seventh Infantry. He reenlisted five years later.

== The Great Sioux War of 1876-77 ==
In March 1876, Company E Seventh Infantry, commanded by Captain Walter Clifford, departed their station at Camp Baker, Montana, to join General John Gibbon in preparation to launching against the Lakota and Northern Cheyenne who had refused to come into the reservations. The company arrived at Fort Ellis near Bozeman where other troops were gathering. In April, the column departed, heading east along the Yellowstone River and finally meeting up with General Alfred Terry's column in early June. After Lieutenant Colonel George Custer's column broke off heading up the Rosebud, the Terry-Gibbon column marched up the Yellowstone and then turned up the Rosebud River. They arrived at the tragic scene of the Battle of the Little Bighorn two days after Custer and his men had lost their lives.

On July 9, 1876, General Terry called for volunteers to carry a message to General George Crook about the Custer disaster and to offering to coordinate their columns against the Indians, who responded violently to attempts to forced relocation and attacks from Americans. To accomplish this dangerous mission of attacking Indians in their home land, three privates from Captain Clifford's company volunteered to carry the message: Bell, William Evans, and Benjamin F. Stewart. It took the soldiers three days to make their way to General Crook's camp near present-day Sheridan, Wyoming. For their bravery, all three soldiers were awarded the Medal of Honor on December 2, 1876. The citation reads "Carried dispatches to Gen. Crook at the imminent risk of his life."

== Later life ==
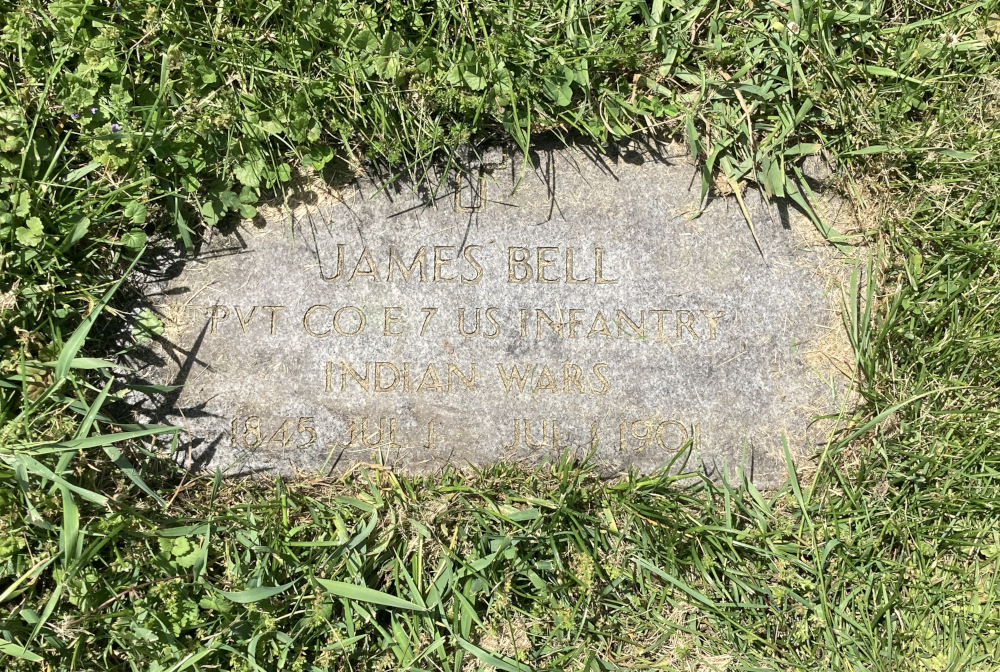
Bell's grave at Mount Olivet Cemetery

Private Bell was promoted to sergeant and spent the remainder of his professional life in the Army, serving eight enlistments in all. He was married in 1888 and had one son, born at Fort Logan in 1897. Bell returned to Chicago, where he died on July 1, 1901. He was buried in the Mount Olivet Cemetery in Chicago.

== See also ==
- List of Medal of Honor recipients
- List of Medal of Honor recipients for the Indian Wars

== Note ==
Private Bell should not be confused with two-time Medal of Honor recipient James Franklin Bell, who later obtained the rank of major general or with Sergeant James B. Bell of the 11th Ohio Infantry, who was awarded his medal during the Civil War
