= Hiram R. Howard =

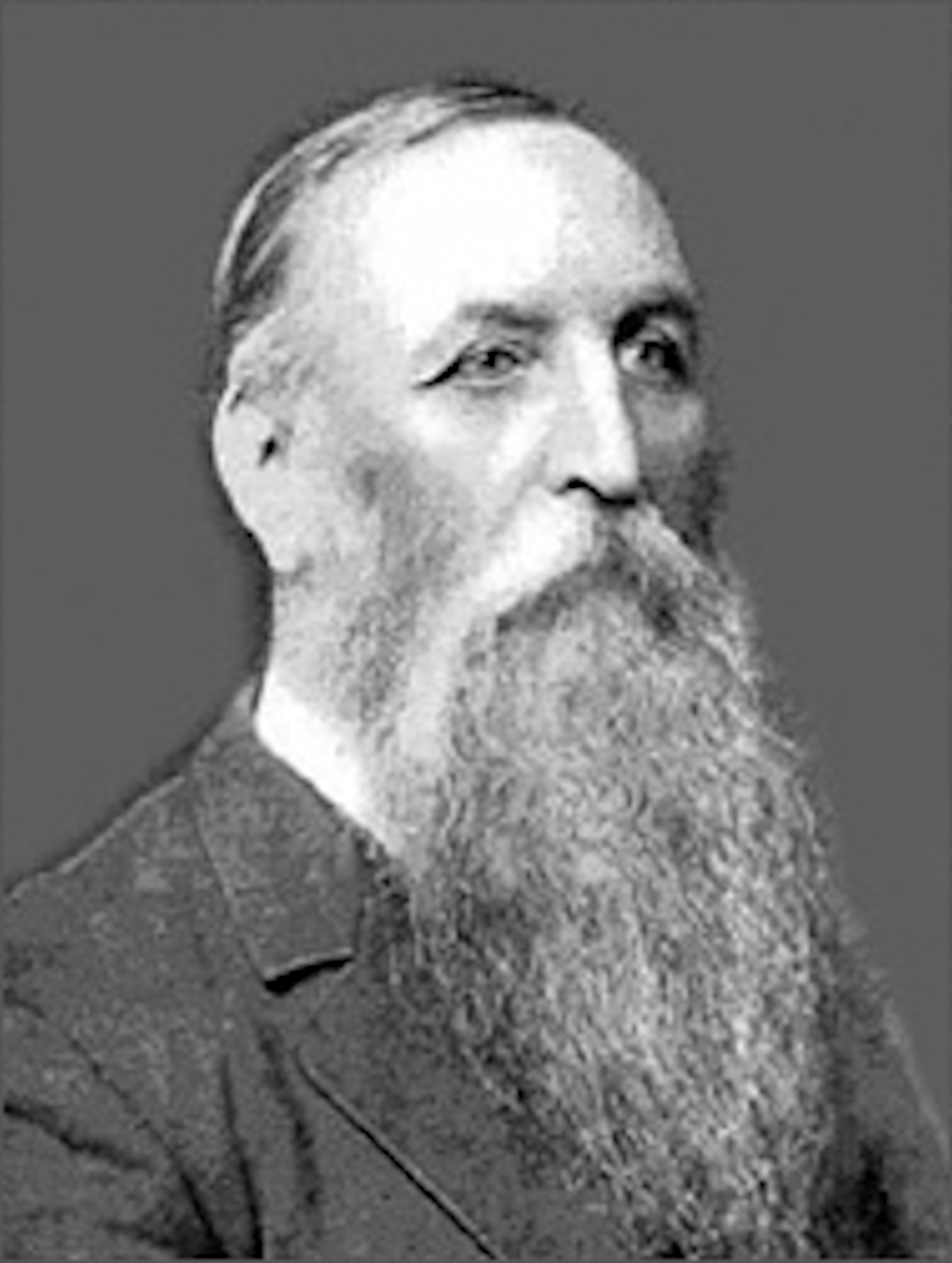
Hiram R. Howard in 1905

Hiram Reese Howard (February 17, 1843 – May 9, 1912) was an American soldier and recipient of the Medal of Honor.

== Biography ==
Howard was born in Urbana, Ohio on February 17, 1843. He served in the Union Army during the American Civil War as a private in Company H of the 11th Ohio Volunteer Infantry Regiment. He earned his medal on November 25, 1863, at Missionary Ridge, Tennessee. Howard received the medal on July 29, 1892. He died in Point Pleasant, West Virginia. He is now buried in Lone Oak Cemetery in Point Pleasant.

== Medal of Honor Citation ==
Scaled the enemy's works and in a hand-to-hand fight helped capture the flag of the 18th Alabama Infantry (C.S.A.).
