= Jim Brogan =

Jim or James Brogan may refer to:

- Jim Brogan (basketball) (born 1958), American basketball player, played for the San Diego Clippers in the early 1980s
- Jim Brogan (Scottish footballer) (1944–2018), Scottish footballer, played for Celtic F.C. in the late 1960s and early 1970s
- Jim Brogan (Gaelic footballer), Irish Gaelic footballer, played for Dublin GAA in the 1970s
- Jimmy Brogan (born 1948), American comedian, writer, actor
- James Brogan (footballer, born 1865) (1864–1951), Scottish footballer, played for Hibernian, Heart of Midlothian and Bolton Wanderers in the 1880s and 1890s
- James Brogan (footballer, born 1890) (1890–?), Scottish footballer, played for Bristol Rovers in the 1910s
- James Brogan (Medal of Honor) (1834–1908), U.S. Army soldier
