= Mark McGrillis =

American baseball player (1872–1935)

- Third Baseman
- Born: October 22, 1872; Philadelphia, Pennsylvania, U.S.
- Died: May 16, 1935 (aged 62); Philadelphia, Pennsylvania, U.S.
- Batted: Unknown Threw: Unknown

MLB debut
- September 17, 1892, for the St. Louis Browns

Last MLB appearance
- September 17, 1892, for the St. Louis Browns

MLB statistics
- Batting average: .000
- Home runs: 0
- Runs batted in: 0

Teams
- St. Louis Browns (1892)

Mark Anthony McGrillis (October 22, 1872 – May 16, 1935) was a 19th-century American Major League Baseball third baseman. He played for the St. Louis Browns of the National League in 1892. He went to school at the University of Pennsylvania.

He died on May 16, 1935, and was interred at Old Cathedral Cemetery in Philadelphia.
