= Cathedral Cemetery =

Historic cemetery in Philadelphia, Pennsylvania

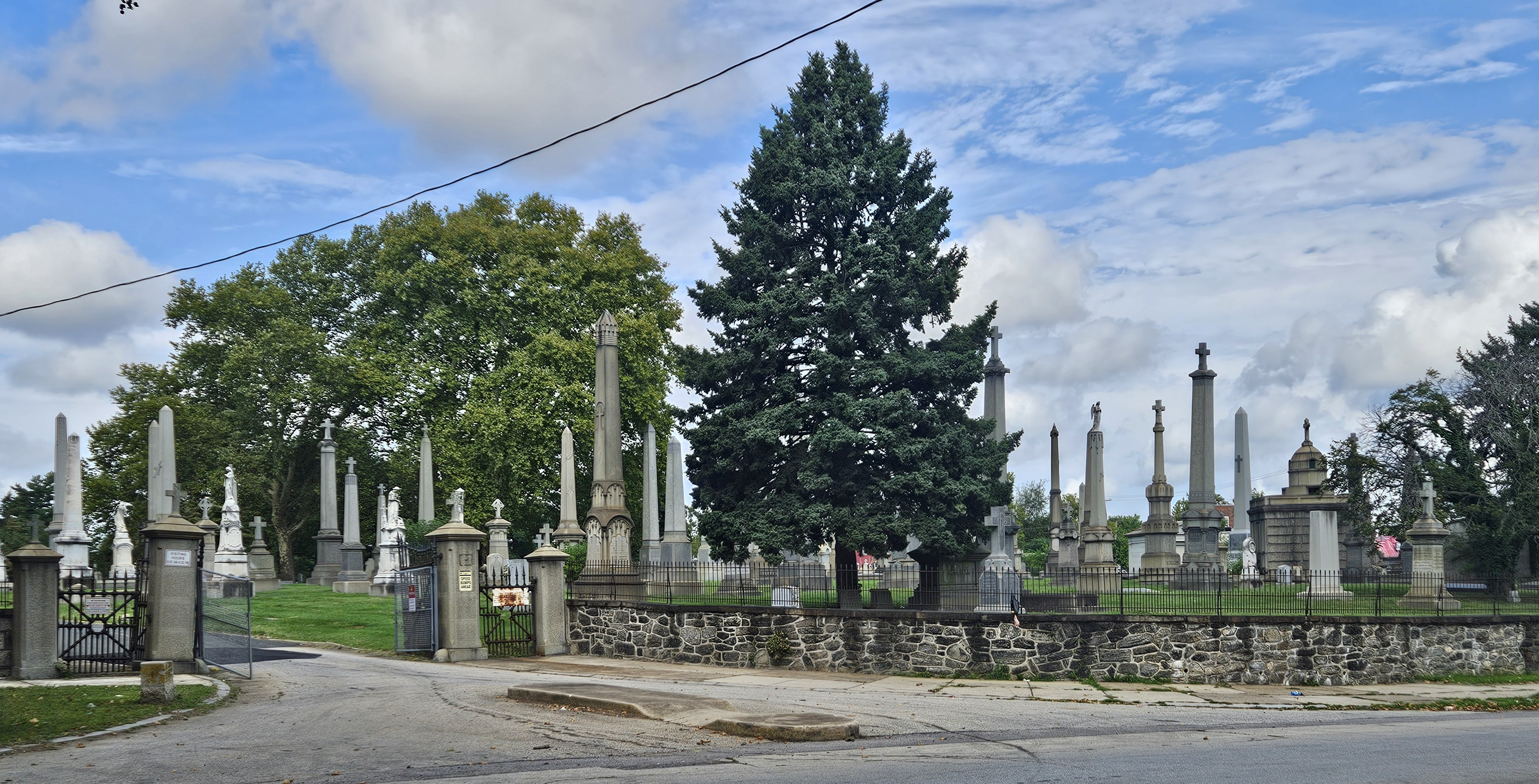
- Interactive map of Cathedral Cemetery

Details
- Established: 1849
- Country: United States
- Coordinates: 39°58′16″N 75°13′16″W
- Size: 45 acres (18 ha)
- Website: Official website

Cathedral Cemetery, also known as Old Cathedral Cemetery, is a historic Catholic cemetery established by the Roman Catholic Archdiocese of Philadelphia in 1849 in the Mill Creek neighborhood of Philadelphia, Pennsylvania, United States. It was the first of 12 diocesan cemeteries established in the Philadelphia area.

== Description ==
The cemetery is located at 1032 N. 48th Street, near the intersection of Lancaster Avenue and Girard Avenue, in the Mill Creek neighborhood of Philadelphia, Pennsylvania. The cemetery is 45 acres (18 ha) in size and is adjacent to the former Our Mother of Sorrows church. It is managed by StoneMor partners.

== History ==
Prior to Cathedral Cemetery, the burial options for Catholics were limited in Philadelphia. From 1733 to 1759, St. Joseph's was the only Catholic cemetery in Philadelphia. Before that, Catholics were buried in the Strangers' Burial Ground, a potter's field now used as Washington Square park. Eventually other parish churchyards at St. Mary's, Holy Trinity, and St. Augustine were used for the burials of Catholics.

Cathedral Cemetery was founded in 1849 by the Archdiocese of Philadelphia and was the first of 12 diocesan cemeteries in the Philadelphia area. It was established to support burials due to the influx of Catholic immigrants to Philadelphia from Ireland and Germany. Bishop Francis Kenrick purchased a farm for usage as a cemetery and an orphanage. It was named Cathedral Cemetery since funds raised by the sale of burial lots were intended for the construction of the Cathedral Basilica of Saints Peter and Paul.

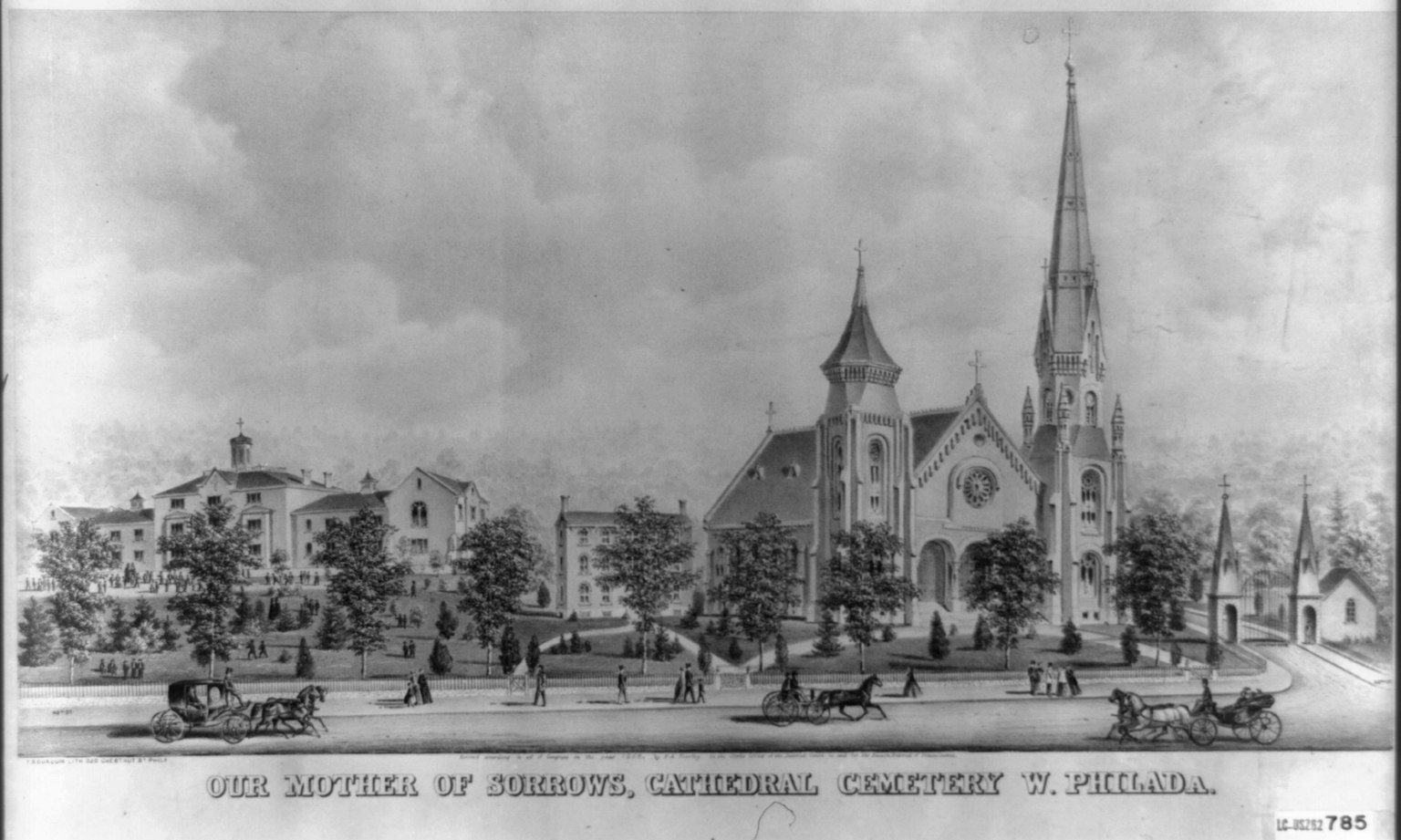
Print of Our Mother of Sorrows Church and Cathedral Cemetery

In 1852, church services were held in a tool shed on the cemetery property. The tool shed chapel was named St. Gregory's. In 1853, the chapel was doubled in size and two wings were added in 1856. As attendance increased, the congregation name was changed and the Our Mother of Sorrows church was built in 1870. The church closed in 2017 due to low attendance and the high cost of maintenance.

In 1861, the New Cathedral Cemetery was established by the archdiocese in the Francisville neighborhood of Philadelphia.

Cathedral Cemetery contains the burials of over 50 members of the 69th Pennsylvania Infantry Regiment, a volunteer regiment of Irish immigrants that fought at the Battle of Gettysburg and other major battles of the American Civil War. Many were too poor to afford headstones and were buried in unmarked graves. On Veterans Day in 2002, a memorial to the members of the regiment was installed by an American Civil War reenactment group from Bucks County, Pennsylvania.

== Notable burials ==
- Edmund English (1841–1912), Medal of Honor recipient
- William Harnett (1848–1892), painter
- Mark McGrillis (1872–1935), Major League Baseball player
- St. Clair Augustine Mulholland (1839–1910), brevet major general in the Union army
- James Thayer (c. 1853–1886), Medal of Honor recipient
