= Gabriel Christie (British Army officer) =

British Army general

General Gabriel Christie
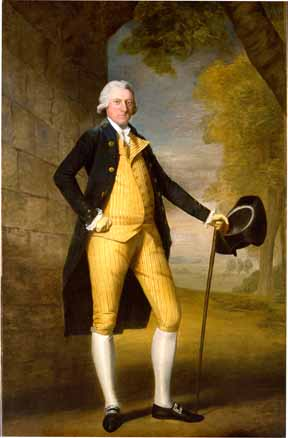
- Portrait of Christie by Ralph Earl, c. 1784
- Born: 16 September 1722 Stirling, Scotland
- Died: 26 January 1799 (aged 76)

Gabriel Christie (16 September 1722 – 26 January 1799) was a British Army General from Scotland, who settled in Montreal after the Seven Years' War. Following the British Conquest of New France, he invested in land and became one of the largest landowners in the British Province of Quebec.

== Early life ==
Born in Stirling, he was the son of James Christie (1695-1745), a wealthy merchant and manufacturer with branches in Glasgow, London and Baltimore. Gabriel's mother, Catherine Napier, was the daughter of Francis Napier (d.1713), of Craigannet; Provost of Stirling and a grandson of the distinguished John Napier. Christie was educated in Stirling, Glasgow and England. Gabriel Christie entered the army as an ensign in 1742 under the patronage of his uncle, Lt.-General Robert Napier (1708-1766), Chief Staff Officer to the Duke of Cumberland at the Battle of Culloden.

== Military career ==
In 1745, Christie was gazetted Lieutenant of the 27th (Inniskilling) Regiment of Foot. Present with his uncle at the Battle of Culloden, young Christie was sent to the governor of Stirling Castle with the despatches announcing the victory. As Captain of the 44th Regiment of Foot, in 1756 General Abercrombie appointed him assistant-deputy-Quartermaster-General to the Forces in North America, maintaining that position under the new commander-in-chief, Earl Loudoun. He fought with Wolfe at the Siege of Quebec, when he was promoted Brevet Major. In 1762, he was promoted to Lieutenant-Colonel, and in 1769 he was made deputy-Quartermaster-General to the Forces in North America. In 1773, he was appointed Lt.-Colonel of the King's Royal Rifle Corps and served with them in the West Indies. In 1778, he was made Colonel Commandant of the 2nd Battalion of that regiment. In 1780, they were serving in Antigua and in 1781 he was appointed Major-General and Commander-in-Chief of the Leeward Islands. In 1793, he was gazetted Lt.-General, and in 1796 he was made Colonel Commandant of the King's Royal Rifle Corps. In 1798, he received his final promotion to General and Commander-in-Chief of the British Forces in the Canadas, at Montreal.

== Canadian Seigneur ==
Christie was based in the West Indies during most of the American Revolution, but in the 1780s, when his active role in the army was completed, he settled in Quebec where he had already started with his intentions of becoming a significant Seigneur there. In 1764, he purchased six seigneuries from noble French Canadian families returning to France after the Conquest. The first was the seigneury of L’Islet-du-Portage, from Paul-Joseph Le Moyne de Longueuil (son of Charles le Moyne de Longueuil, Baron de Longueuil), but he sold it in 1777 preferring land closer to Montreal. His second and third purchases were in partnership with Moses Hazen, acquiring the seigneuries of Bleury and Sabrevois from Clément Sabrevois de Bleury (father of Clément-Charles Sabrevois de Bleury) for £7,300. His fourth purchase was with John Campbell (1721-1795), buying the seigneury of Noyan from the Payen de Noyan family. In 1765, he purchased the seigneury of Lacolle, from the family of Jacques-Philippe Saveuse de Beaujeu. Finally, he purchased the seigneury of Léry from Gaspard-Joseph Chaussegros de Léry. Around 1777, he added the seigneuries of Lachenaie and Repentigny to his lands. He owned land in England too, but even these seigneurial acquisitions were not enough to satisfy his ambition: In 1792, he made two unsuccessful requests for land grants in the Eastern Townships. His final purchase was in 1796, when Jean-Baptiste Boucher de Niverville sold him the seigneury of Chambly.

Christie hired agents to look after his extensive land holdings and lived comfortably in Montreal with his family until his death, despite a few set backs. His property along the Richelieu River was devastated during the American Invasion of Canada in 1775. The seigneuries near St. Johns that he purchased with Hazen also created difficulties for him as during the War of Independence Hazen sided with the armies under Richard Montgomery who invaded Quebec. Hazen and Christie were in court for years over their failed business partnership.

== Family ==
He had married Sarah Stevenson, daughter of John Stevenson of Albany, New York when stationed in the area, and settled her, their son and two daughters in Montreal. During his time in London in the 1780s, he had taken a mistress by the name of Rachel Plenderleath, and by her was the father of three further sons (Gabriel, George and William) who were fully accepted into the main family and provided for equally - they each received £1,500 and commissions in the King's Royal Rifle Corps, while their eldest legitimate brother, Napier, inherited the bulk of his estate, before passing it to his half-brother. Christie lived with his family on Rue Saint-Paul, Montreal.

- General Napier Christie-Burton (1758-1835), M.P., for Beverley, who succeeded his father as Commander-in-Chief of the British troops in the Canadas. Educated at Eton, as a compliment to his father he was invited to Windsor Castle by George III. He married Mary, daughter and heiress of General Ralph Burton, of Hotham Hall, Yorkshire and assumed the Burton name by license. Their sons died unmarried. Their eldest daughter married first Major-General John Clitherow and second Henry Peters of Betchworth Castle. Their youngest daughter founded at Wakefield a home for discharged female prisoners.
- Catherine Christie (1772-1849). At Jamaica, she married Major John Robertson (1767-1815), of the King's Royal Rifle Corps, son of Colonel Daniel Robertson of Struan. He was associated with the mercantile firm of Alexander & James Robertson of Montreal, through whom he was granted 2,000 acres in the township of Buckingham, Quebec. She returned to Montreal in 1831 with her three children: Catherine (married Philip Anglin, of the King's Royal Rifle Corps), Maria and Amelia.
- Sarah Christie (1774-1836), married Rev. James Tunstall (1760-1840), Rector of Christ Church Cathedral, Montreal. They were the parents of three sons and a daughter, Mrs Edward Roe.
- Gabriel Plenderleath (b.c.1778)
- George Plenderleath (b.c.1779)
- William Smith Plenderleath (1780-1845), inherited his father's Canadian estates from his half-brother, on the condition he took the name 'Christie'. He was married three times, but had no children (1) In 1808, Marie-Marguerite Chaboillez, daughter of Charles Chaboillez and widow of Simon McTavish of the North West Company, (2) Elizabeth McGinnis (3) Amelia Martha Bowman (1805-1898)

== See also ==
- James Bell (merchant)
