= 2nd New Jersey Infantry Regiment =

- Active: April 26, 1861 to July 21, 1861; May 27, 1861 to July 11, 1865
- Country: United States
- Allegiance: Union
- Branch: United States Army; Union Army
- Type: Infantry
- Engagements: First Battle of Bull Run (reserve); Siege of Yorktown; Seven Days Battles; Battle of Gaines's Mill; Battle of Garnett's & Golding's Farm; Battle of Glendale; Battle of Malvern Hill; Second Battle of Bull Run; Battle of South Mountain; Battle of Antietam; Battle of Fredericksburg; Battle of Chancellorsville; Battle of Gettysburg; Bristoe Campaign; Mine Run Campaign; Battle of the Wilderness; Battle of Spotsylvania Court House; Battle of Cold Harbor; Siege of Petersburg; Battle of Fort Stevens; Battle of Fisher's Hill; Third Battle of Winchester; Battle of Cedar Creek; Third Battle of Petersburg; Appomattox Campaign; Battle of Appomattox Court House

The 2nd New Jersey Infantry Regiment was an infantry regiment in the Union Army during the American Civil War.

== Service ==
=== Three months regiment ===
The 2nd New Jersey Infantry Regiment was first organized at Trenton, New Jersey for three months service on April 26, 1861, and mustered on May 1, 1861, under the command of Colonel George W. McLean.

The regiment was attached to Runyon's New Jersey Brigade, Defenses of Washington, to June 1861. 1st Brigade, Runyon's Reserve Division, McDowell's Army of Northeast Virginia, to July 1861.

Left New Jersey for Washington, D.C., May 3. Reported to General Butler at Annapolis, Maryland, May 5, then moved to Washington, arriving there May 6. Camped at Meridian Hill May 24. 24. Occupied Arlington Heights, Va., May 24. Constructed Fort Runyon. Duty on line of Alexandria & Loudon Railroad until July 16. Advanced on Manassas, Va., July 16–21. First Battle of Bull Run July 21 (reserve).

The 2nd New Jersey Infantry mustered out of service July 21, 1861 at Trenton.

=== Three years regiment ===
The 2nd New Jersey Infantry was reorganized at Camp Olden in Trenton for three years service on May 27, 1861, under the command of Colonel Samuel L. Buck.

The regiment was attached to 2nd Brigade, Runyon's Reserve Division, McDowell's Army of Northeast Virginia, to August 1861. Kearney's Brigade, Division of the Potomac, to October 1861. Kearney's Brigade, Franklin's Division, Army of the Potomac, to March 1862. 1st Brigade, 1st Division, I Corps, Army of the Potomac, to April 1862. 1st Brigade, 1st Division, Department of the Rappahannock, to May 1862. 1st Brigade, 1st Division, VI Corps, Army of the Potomac and Army of the Shenandoah, to July 1865.

Duty in the Defenses of Washington, D.C., until March 1862. Advance on Manassas, Va., March 8–15. Advance from Alexandria to Bristoe Station April 741. Embarked for the Virginia Peninsula April 17. Siege of Yorktown, Va., April 19 – May 4 (on transports). West Point May 7–8. Seven Days before Richmond June 25 – July 1. Battle of Gaines's Mill June 27. Garnett's Farm June 27. Golding's Farm June 28. Charles City Cross Roads and Glendale June 30. Malvern Hill July 1. At Harrison's Landing until August 16, Movement to Fort Monroe and Manassas, Va., June 16–26. Pope's Campaign in northern Virginia August 26 – September 2. Action at Bull Run Bridge, Manassas, August 27. Second Battle of Bull Run August 30. Cover Pope's retreat to Centreville August 30–31. Maryland Campaign September 6–22. Battle South Mountain September 14. Battle of Antietam September 16–17. Duty at Sharpsburg, Md., until October 29. Movement to Falmouth, Va., October 29 – November 19. Battle of Fredericksburg December 12–15. Duty at Falmouth until April 27, 1863. "Mud March" January 20–24. Chancellorsville Campaign April 27 – May 6. Operations at Franklin's Crossing April 29 – May 2. Battle of Maryes Heights, Fredericksburg, May 3. Salem Heights May 3–4. Banks Ford May 4. Gettysburg Campaign June 11 – July 24. Battle of Gettysburg July 2–4. Pursuit of Lee to Manassas Gap, Va. Fairfield, Pa., July 5. At and near Funkstown, Md., July 10–13. Near Warrenton, Va., until September 15, and at Culpeper until October. Bristoe Campaign October 9–22. Advance to line of the Rappahannock November 7–8. Rappahannock Station November 7. Mine Run Campaign November 26 – December 2. At Brandy Station until May 1864. Campaign from the Rapidan to the James May 3 – June 15. Battle of the Wilderness May 5–7. Spotsylvania May 8–12. Spotsylvania Court House May 12–21. Assault on the Salient, "Bloody Angle," May 12. North Anna River May 23–26. On line of the Pamunkey May 26–28. Totopotomoy May 28–31. Battles about Cold Harbor June 1–12, 1864. Before Petersburg June 17–19. Siege of Petersburg until July 9. Jerusalem Plank Road June 22–23. Moved to Washington, D.C., July 9–11. Repulse of Early's attack on Fort Stevens and the northern defenses of Washington July 11–12. Pursuit of Early to Snicker's Gap, Va., July 14–23. Sheridan's Shenandoah Valley Campaign August 7 – November 28. Strasburg August 14–15. Cedar Creek August 15. Winchester August 17. Charlestown August 21–22. Battle of Winchester September 19. Fisher's Hill September 22. Battle of Cedar Creek October 19. Duty in the Shenandoah Valley until December. Moved to Washington, D.C., then to Petersburg, Va. Siege of Petersburg December 1864 to April 2, 1865. Dabney's Mills, Hatcher's Run, February 5–7, 1865. Appomattox Campaign March 28 – April 9. Fall of Petersburg April 2. Pursuit of Lee April 3–9. Appomattox Court House April 9. Surrender of Lee and his army. March to Danville April 23–27 and duty there until May 18. March to Richmond, Va., thence to Washington, D.C., May 18 – June 3. Corps review June 8.

Non-veterans were relieved for muster out at the end of May 1864. Veterans and recruits were temporarily attached to the 15th New Jersey Volunteer Infantry under orders of May 29, 1864, until December 17, 1864, when the regiment was reorganized as a battalion. Non-veterans mustered out at Newark, New Jersey on June 21, 1864. The 2nd New Jersey Infantry mustered out of service July 11, 1865 at Hall's Hill, Virginia.

== Casualties ==
The regiment lost a total of 165 men during service; 7 officers and 89 enlisted men killed or mortally wounded, 2 officers and 67 enlisted men died of disease.

== Commanders ==
- Colonel George W. McLean
- Colonel Isaac M. Tucker – killed in action during the Seven Days Battles
- Colonel Samuel L. Buck – disabled on May 4, 1863, when his horse fell on him in action at Banks's Ford; he never returned to command the regiment
- Colonel James McNeely – transferred in as lieutenant colonel to command the battalion on April 5, 1865; promoted to colonel on July 10, 1865
- Lieutenant Colonel Charles Wiebecke – assumed command of the regiment after Col. Buck's injury; killed in action at the Battle of Spotsylvania Court House.

== Notable members ==
- 1st Sergeant Edmund English, Company C – Medal of Honor recipient for action during the Battle of the Wilderness

== See also ==
- List of New Jersey Civil War units
- New Jersey in the American Civil War
