= William Evans (Medal of Honor) =

Irish-born soldier in the U.S. Army

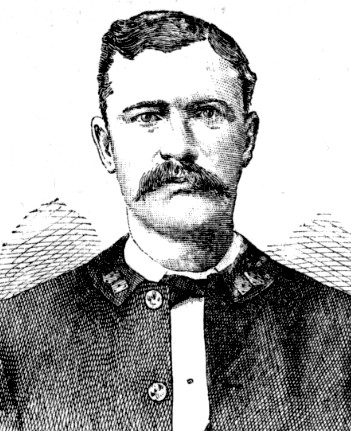
- An illustration of Corporal William Evans after the Battle of the Little Bighorn.
- Born: c. 1852; Annagh, Ireland
- Died: November 26, 1893 (aged 41); Greeley, Colorado, United States
- Burial place: Linn Grove Cemetery
- Military career
- Allegiance: United States of America
- Branch: United States Army
- Service years: 1875–1881
- Rank: Corporal
- Unit: 7th U.S. Infantry
- Conflicts: Indian Wars; Black Hills War
- Awards: Medal of Honor

William Evans (c. 1852 – November 26, 1893) was an Irish-born soldier in the U.S. Army who served with the 7th U.S. Infantry during the Black Hills War. He participated in campaigns against the Sioux in the Montana Territory and, at Big Horn from July 9–14, 1876, volunteered to deliver critical dispatches between Generals George Crook and Alfred Terry. He later received the Medal of Honor for his heroic actions.

== Biography ==
William Evans was born in Annagh, Ireland, in 1851. He later emigrated to the United States and enlisted in the U.S. Army in St. Louis, Missouri on April 26, 1875. From there, Evans went to Newport, Kentucky, where he was sent to the frontier with the 7th U.S. Infantry. Within a year, he would take part in actions against the Sioux in the Montana Territory during the Black Hills War. In the aftermath of the Battle of the Little Bighorn, he and two other soldiers, Pvts. Benjamin F. Stewart and James Bell, volunteered to carry important dispatches between Generals George Crook and Alfred Terry. There had been two previous attempts to get messages though, both unsuccessful, and Evans and his comrades had to pass through 100 miles of territory occupied by an estimated 2,000 Sioux and Cheyenne warriors. Between July 9–14, 1876, they traveled back and forth from Crook and Terry's camps. Hiding during the day and traveling at night, they were able to safely avoid Sioux war parties. For their actions, all three men received the Medal of Honor. Evans remained in the military, reenlisting at Camp Baker on November 2, 1878, and promoted to the rank of corporal on November 30, 1880. He spent the last three years of his life farming in Greeley, Colorado. He died there on November 26, 1893, and was buried at Linn Grove Cemetery.

== Medal of Honor citation ==
Rank and organization: Private, Company E, 7th U.S. Infantry. Place and date: At Big Horn, Mont., July 9, 1876. Entered service at: St. Louis, Mo. Birth: Ireland. Date of issue: December 2, 1876.

Citation:

Carried dispatches to Brig. Gen. Crook through a country occupied by Sioux.

== See also ==
- List of Medal of Honor recipients
