= James Bell (reformer) =

English reformer (died 1596)

James Bell (fl. between 1547 and 1596) was an English reformer.

== Biography ==
Bell was a native of the Diocese of Bath, Somersetshire, and was admitted a fellow of Corpus Christi College, Oxford, probably in 1547. He graduated B.A. in 1551, and on 30 May 1556 was nominated a fellow of Trinity College, Oxford, when he was appointed rhetoric lecturer. The doubts expressed by Wood as to whether these details do not apply to James Bell, a Roman Catholic priest executed in 1584, are set at rest by Bliss in a life of Bell added to the Athenæ. Bell in the Michaelmas term of 1550 gave up his fellowship, and became a zealous partisan of the Reformation. In 1564 he wrote and dedicated to Queen Elizabeth An Account of Caecilia, Princess of Sweden, travelling into England, which exists only in a manuscript preserved in the British Museum (MS. Royal 17). From the character of his description it is probable that he accompanied the princess to England. The other works of Bell are translations from the Latin as follows: 1. Sermon preached at the christening of a certain Jew at London by John Foxe, 1573. 2. Sermon of the Evangelical Olive by John Foxe, 1578. 3. Treatise touching the Libertie of a Christian Man by Luther, 1579. 4. The Pope Confuted — the Holy and Apostolical Church Confuting the Pope — the First Action by John Foxe, 1580. 5. Answer Apologetical to Hierome Osorius, his Slanderous Invectives by Haddon and Foxe, 1581. On 13 February 1595 Bell was presented to the prebend of Holcombe in the church of Wells, and on 11 October 1596 to that of Combe in the same church. The date and place of his death are unknown.
