= James Bell (footballer, born 1883) =

English footballer (1883–1962)

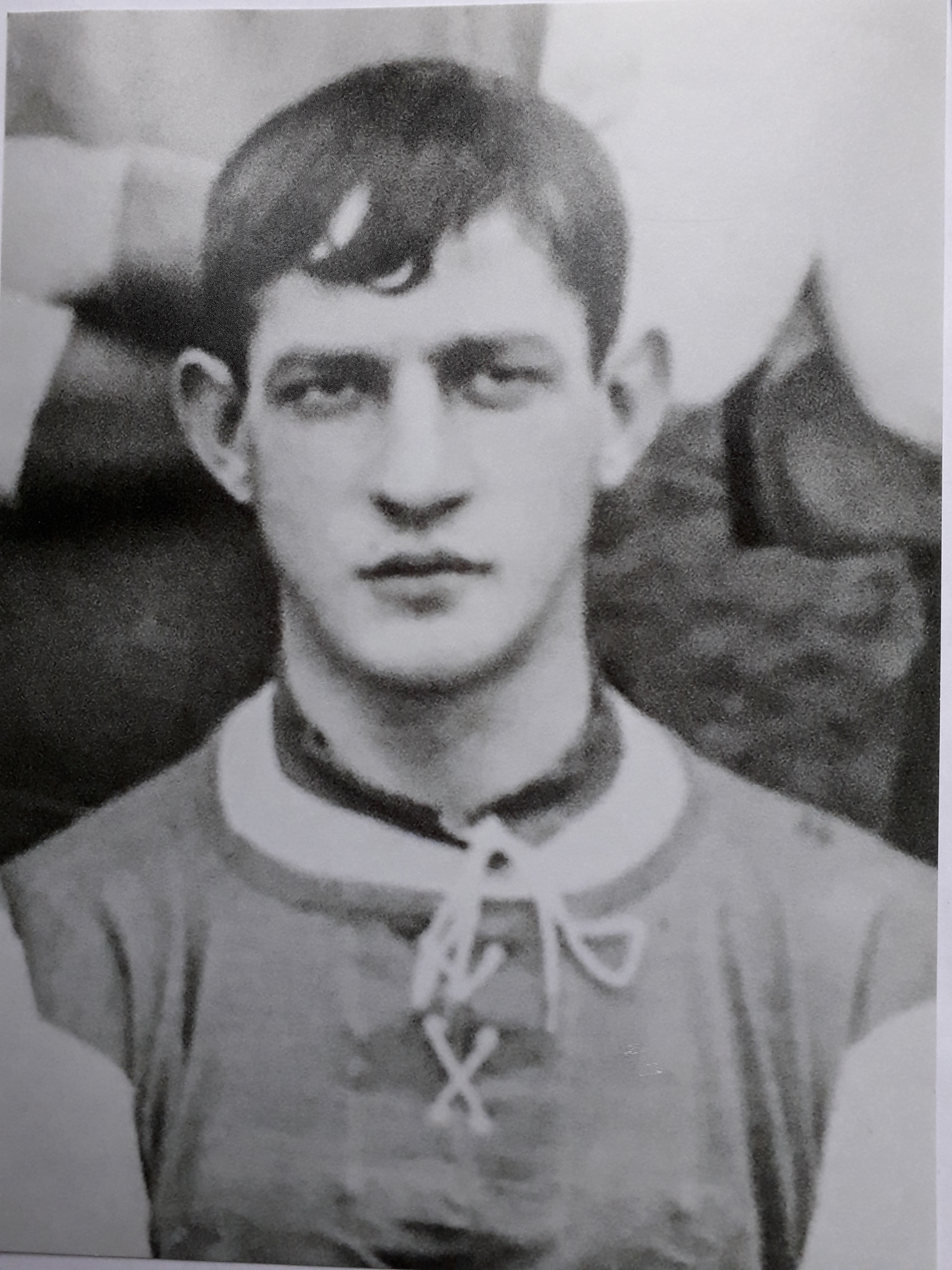

Personal information
- Date of birth: 1883
- Place of birth: Eston, England
- Date of death: 1962 (aged 78–79)
- Position: Forward

Senior career*
| Years | Team | Apps | (Gls) |
| 1900–1904 | Grangetown | | |
| 1904–1905 | Middlesbrough | 10 | (4) |
| 1905–1906 | Eston United | | |
| 1906–1908 | Barrow | | |
| 1908–1911 | Exeter City | 105 | (51) |
| 1911 | Portsmouth | | |
| 1911–1917 | Barrow | | |
| Total | | 115+ | (55+) |
- * Club domestic league appearances and goals

James Bell (1883–1962) was an English professional footballer who played as a forward.

== Career ==
Born in Eston, Bell played for Grangetown, Middlesbrough, Eston United, Barrow, Exeter City, and Portsmouth, returning to Barrow before later playing in the United States. He is Exeter's leading goalscorer in the Southern Football League, with 51 goals in 105 league games, and 63 goals in 119 games in all competitions.
