= James Bell (merchant) =

James Bell (c. 1739 – 5 July 1814) was born in Scotland and was trained as a civil engineer. He came to Canada about 1765 with his wife, a sister of Gabriel Christie, and family.

With solid connections in Canada, Bell quickly established himself as a merchant trading in products such as wheat, meat, spirits, building materials, carriages, and horses. He attained notability in history for his opportunist trading, most notably during the American invasion of 1775–76 and the period immediately following that conflict. He was not directed in his commerce by the causes but by the opportunities to make money. During his affiliation with the American forces, he rendered services to people such as Brigadiers-General Richard Montgomery, David Wooster, and Benedict Arnold. His knowledge of the area and his firm connections in trade allowed him to supply valuable and timely service. A particular part of his activity involved overseeing the repair work on Fort Chambly.

After the Americans left Quebec, Bell offered his services to the British and was involved in construction on a variety of military projects. He then accompanied a British force led by Major-General John Burgoyne to Fort Ticonderoga and subsequently to Fort George to engage the American army.

Bell rendered services to both the British and the American military although he certainly considered himself a loyal British subject. In the end, he was not appreciated by either side, and perhaps that is understandable. In any case, both sides declined to settle debts he perceived were owing him when he encountered financial problems late in his life.
