= Peter O'Brien (Medal of Honor) =

American soldier (c.1842–1898)

- Born: c. 1842; Dublin, Ireland
- Died: September 30, 1898 (aged 55–56); Chicago, Illinois, United States
- Burial place: Rosehill Cemetery, Chicago
- Military career
- Allegiance: United States of America
- Branch: United States Army
- Service years: 1861–1865
- Rank: Corporal
- Units: (New York (state)) Company A, 1st New York Volunteer Cavalry "Lincoln Cavalry"
- Conflicts: Battle of Waynesboro; American Civil War
- Awards: Medal of Honor

Peter O'Brien (c. 1842 – September 30, 1898) was an American soldier who fought in the American Civil War. O'Brien received his country's highest award for bravery during combat, the Medal of Honor. O'Brien's medal was won for capturing a Confederate flag, and an officer with his horse and equipment, at the Battle of Waynesboro, Virginia, on March 2, 1865. He was honored with the award on March 26, 1865.

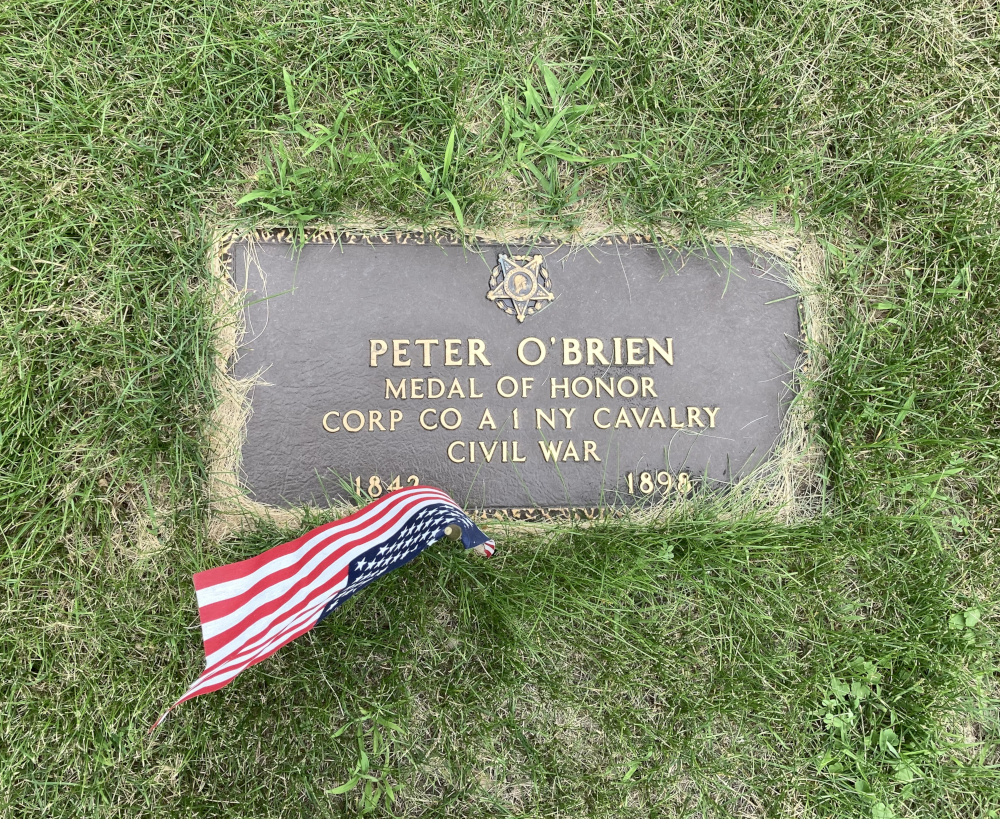
O'Brien's grave at Rosehill Cemetery

O'Brien was born in Dublin, Ireland. He joined the US Army from New York City in August 1861, and mustered out with his regiment in June 1865. He was later buried in Rosehill Cemetery, Chicago, Illinois.

== Medal of Honor citation ==
The President of the United States of America, in the name of Congress, takes pleasure in presenting the Medal of Honor to Private Peter O'Brien, United States Army, for extraordinary heroism on 2 March 1865, while serving with Company A, 1st New York Cavalry (Lincoln), in action at Waynesboro, Virginia, for capture of flag and of a Confederate officer with his horse and equipment.

== See also ==
- List of American Civil War Medal of Honor recipients: G–L
