= Richard Burke (Medal of Honor) =

US Army soldier

- Born: c. 1847; County Tipperary, Ireland
- Died: September 1, 1881 (aged 33–34); Johnson County, Wyoming, US
- Burial place: Custer National Cemetery, Crow Agency, Montana, US
- Military career
- Allegiance: United States of America
- Branch: United States Army
- Rank: Private
- Unit: Company G 5th Infantry
- Conflicts: Indian Wars
- Awards: Medal of Honor

Richard Burke (c. 1847 – September 1, 1881) was a United States Army soldier who received the Medal of Honor during the Indian Wars for actions performed at the Battle of Cedar Creek in Montana on October 21, 1876.

== Biography ==
He was born in 1847 in County Tipperary, Ireland. He was presented the medal on July 18, 1877 by General William T. Sherman. He died on September 1, 1881, near Johnson County, Wyoming and was buried at Custer National Cemetery, Crow Agency, Montana. The citation simply reads, "[g]allantry in engagements."
