= Thomas Timothy Fallon =

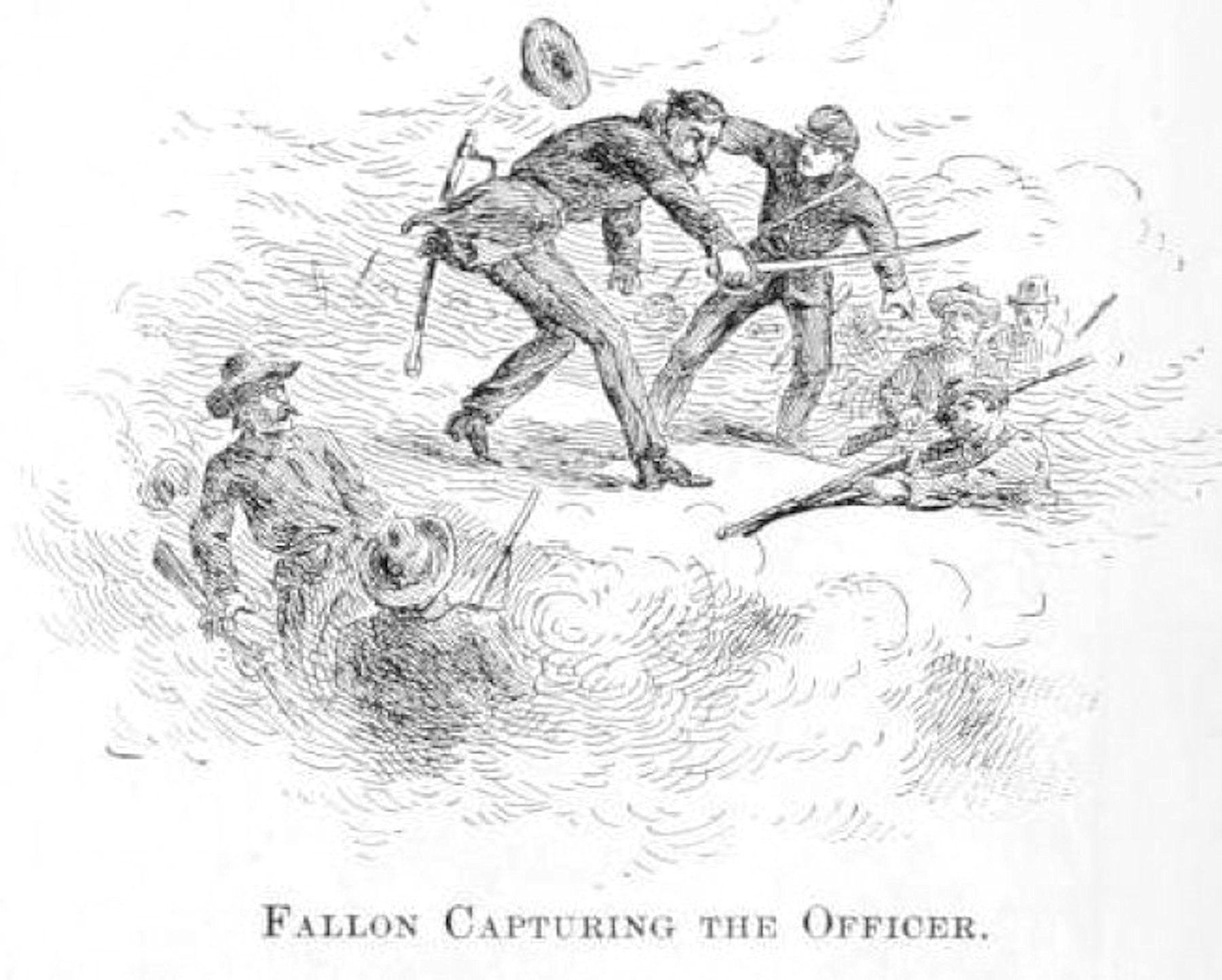
- Medal of Honor Winner Private Timothy Thomas Fallon at Battle of Kennesaw Mountain, Big Shanty, Georgia 1864
- Born: August 17, 1837; County Galway, Ireland
- Died: August 23, 1916 (aged 79); Freehold, New Jersey, US
- Burial place: Saint Rose of Lima Cemetery, Freehold, New Jersey
- Military career
- Allegiance: United States of America
- Branch: United States Army; Union Army
- Service years: 1861 - 1865
- Rank: Sergeant
- Unit: (New York (state)) 37th New York Volunteer Infantry Regiment
- Conflicts: Battle of Williamsburg; Battle of Fair Oaks; Battle of Kennesaw Mountain
- Awards: Medal of Honor

Thomas Timothy Fallon (August 17, 1837 – August 23, 1916) was an Irish-born American soldier who fought in the American Civil War. Fallon received the United States' highest award for bravery during combat, the Medal of Honor, for his action during the Battle of Williamsburg in Virginia in May 1862 and the Battle of Seven Pines in Virginia and Big Shanty, Georgia in June 1864. He was honored with the award on 13 February 1891.

== Biography ==
Fallon was born in County Galway, Ireland on 17 August 1837, and immigrated to the United States in 1859. In 1863, he married fellow Irish immigrant Catherine Garrity, settling in Freehold, New Jersey. Together they had two daughters.

Fallon joined the 37th New York Infantry in May 1861, serving at the Battles of Williamsburg and Fair Oaks a year later. He was discharged in December 1862 and immediately enlisted in the 4th US Artillery Regiment. Having been discharged a second time in May 1863, he joined the 35th New Jersey Infantry as a sergeant. He was discharged a third and final time in July 1865.

Fallon died on 23 August 1916 and his remains are interred at the Saint Rose of Lima Cemetery in Freehold, New Jersey.

== Medal of Honor citation ==
At Williamsburg, Virginia, assisted in driving rebel skirmishers to their main line. Participated in action, at Fair Oaks, Virginia, though excused from duty because of disability. In a charge with his company at Big Shanty, Ga., was the first man on the enemy's works.

== See also ==
- List of American Civil War Medal of Honor recipients: A–F
