= James Thayer (Medal of Honor) =

- Born: c. 1853; Ireland
- Died: April 16, 1886 (aged 32–33); Philadelphia, Pennsylvania, U.S.
- Burial place: Old Cathedral Cemetery, Philadelphia, Pennsylvania, U.S.
- Military career
- Allegiance: United States
- Branch: United States Navy
- Rank: Ship's Corporal
- Unit: USS Constitution
- Awards: Medal of Honor

James Thayer (c. 1853–1886) was a United States Navy sailor and a recipient of the United States military's highest decoration, the Medal of Honor.

Born in about 1853 in Ireland, Thayer immigrated to the United States and joined the Navy from Pennsylvania. By November 16, 1879, he was serving as a ship's corporal on the USS Constitution. On that day, while Constitution was at the Norfolk Naval Shipyard in Virginia, he rescued a young shipmate from drowning. For this action, he was awarded the Medal of Honor five years later, on October 18, 1884.

Thayer's official Medal of Honor citation reads:

For rescuing from drowning a boy serving with him on the U.S.S. Constitution, at the Navy Yard, Norfolk, Va., 16 November 1879.

He died on April 16, 1886, and was interred at Old Cathedral Cemetery in Philadelphia.

== See also ==
- List of Medal of Honor recipients during peacetime
