= St. Clair Augustine Mulholland =

Irish-American colonel (1839–1910)

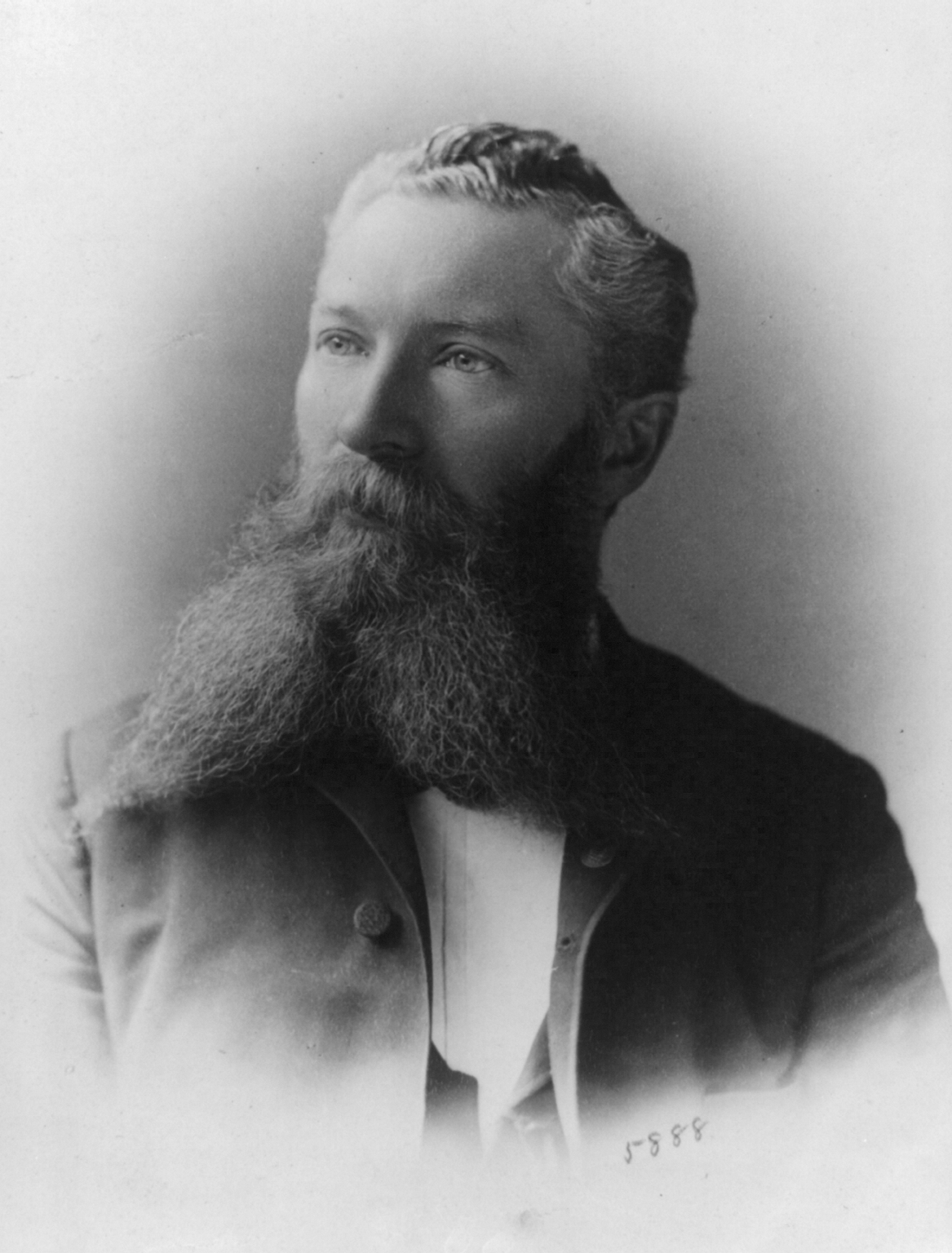
- St. Clair Mulholland
- Born: April 1, 1839; Lisburn, County Antrim, Ireland
- Died: February 17, 1910 (aged 70); Philadelphia, Pennsylvania, U.S.
- Burial place: Old Cathedral Cemetery, Philadelphia, Pennsylvania, U.S.
- Military career
- Allegiance: United States of America; Union
- Branch: United States Army; Union Army
- Service years: 1861–1865
- Rank: Colonel; Brevet Major General
- Commands: 116th Pennsylvania Infantry Regiment
- Conflicts: American Civil War
- Awards: Medal of Honor

St. Clair Augustine Mulholland (April 1, 1839 – February 17, 1910) was a colonel in the Union Army in the American Civil War who later received the brevets of brigadier general of volunteers and major general of volunteers and the Medal of Honor for gallantry in action at the Battle of Chancellorsville.

== Biography ==
Mulholland was born in Lisburn, County Antrim, Ireland (modern-day Northern Ireland). Emigrating to Philadelphia with his parents while a boy, his youthful tastes inclined him to military affairs and he became active in the ranks of the militia. At the start of the Civil War he was commissioned lieutenant colonel of the 116th Pennsylvania Infantry, which was attached to Meagher's Irish Brigade. When the regiment's size was reduced to a battalion, he accepted a reduction in rank to major.

He was wounded during the famous charge of the Irish Brigade up Marye's Heights at the Battle of Fredericksburg on December 13, 1862. At the Battle of Chancellorsville on May 3 and 4, 1863, he led his regiment and distinguished himself by saving the guns of the 5th Maine Battery that had been abandoned to the enemy. For this he was complimented in general orders and later received the Medal of Honor from Congress. In this campaign he was given the command of the picket line by Maj. Gen. Winfield Scott Hancock and covered the retreat of the Army of the Potomac across the Rappahannock River.

Although Mulholland later claimed that at the Battle of Gettysburg on July 2, 1863, he personally took command of the 140th Pennsylvania Infantry and led it into action, this fact is mentioned in neither his own official report of the battle, nor that of the lieutenant colonel commanding the 140th. When the 116th was returned to full strength in early 1864, he was promoted to colonel. He was wounded a second time at the Battle of the Wilderness, May 5, 1864. At Po River he was wounded a third time, but remained in hospital only ten days. Resuming his command, he was dangerously wounded again at the Battle of Totopotomoy Creek. He recovered rapidly and commanded his brigade in all the actions around Petersburg, particularly distinguishing himself by storming a fort on the Boydton Plank Road. Mulholland was mustered out of the volunteer service on June 3, 1865. After the war was over, he was elected as a companion the Military Order of the Loyal Legion of the United States.

On May 4, 1866, President Andrew Johnson nominated Mulholland for the brevet grade of brigadier general of volunteers to rank from March 13, 1865, for his conduct at the Battle of the Wilderness and the U.S. Senate confirmed the appointment on May 18, 1866. On January 13, 1869, President Johnson nominated Mulholland for appointment to the brevet grade of major general of volunteers, to rank from March 13, 1865, for his actions on the Boydton Plank Road and the Senate confirmed the appointment on February 16, 1869. The brevet was issued February 20, 1869; it was the last brevet of major general issued for service during the Civil War.

== Postbellum ==
Returning to civil life after the war, he was appointed Chief of Police in Philadelphia in 1868, and signalized his administration by the good order in which he kept both the force and the city. President Grover Cleveland appointed him United States Pension Agent, in which office he was continued by Presidents McKinley and Roosevelt. He was considered an authority on the science of penology, and also devoted much of his leisure time to art studies, and as a lecturer and writer on the Civil War and its records. He compiled a history of the 116th Regiment, and another of those to whom Congress voted the Medal of Honor. In the Catholic affairs of Philadelphia, he was always active and a leader among the best known laymen.

St. Clair Augustin Mulholland died of heart trouble on February 17, 1910, at Philadelphia, Pennsylvania, and was buried at Old Cathedral Cemetery, Philadelphia.

== Medal of Honor citation ==
Rank and organization: Major, 116th Pennsylvania Infantry. Place and date: At Chancellorsville, Va., 4–5 May 1863. Entered service at: Philadelphia, Pa. Born: April 1, 1839, Ireland. Date of issue: March 26, 1895.

Citation:

In command of the picket line held the enemy in check all night to cover the retreat of the Army.

== In popular culture ==
Colonel Mulholland was portrayed by actor Timothy O'Hare in the 2003 Civil War film Gods and Generals, in the scene depicting the charge of the Irish Brigade at Marye's Heights.

== See also ==
- List of Medal of Honor recipients
- List of American Civil War Medal of Honor recipients: M–P
- List of American Civil War brevet generals (Union)
