= Edmund English =

American soldier and Medal of Honor recipient

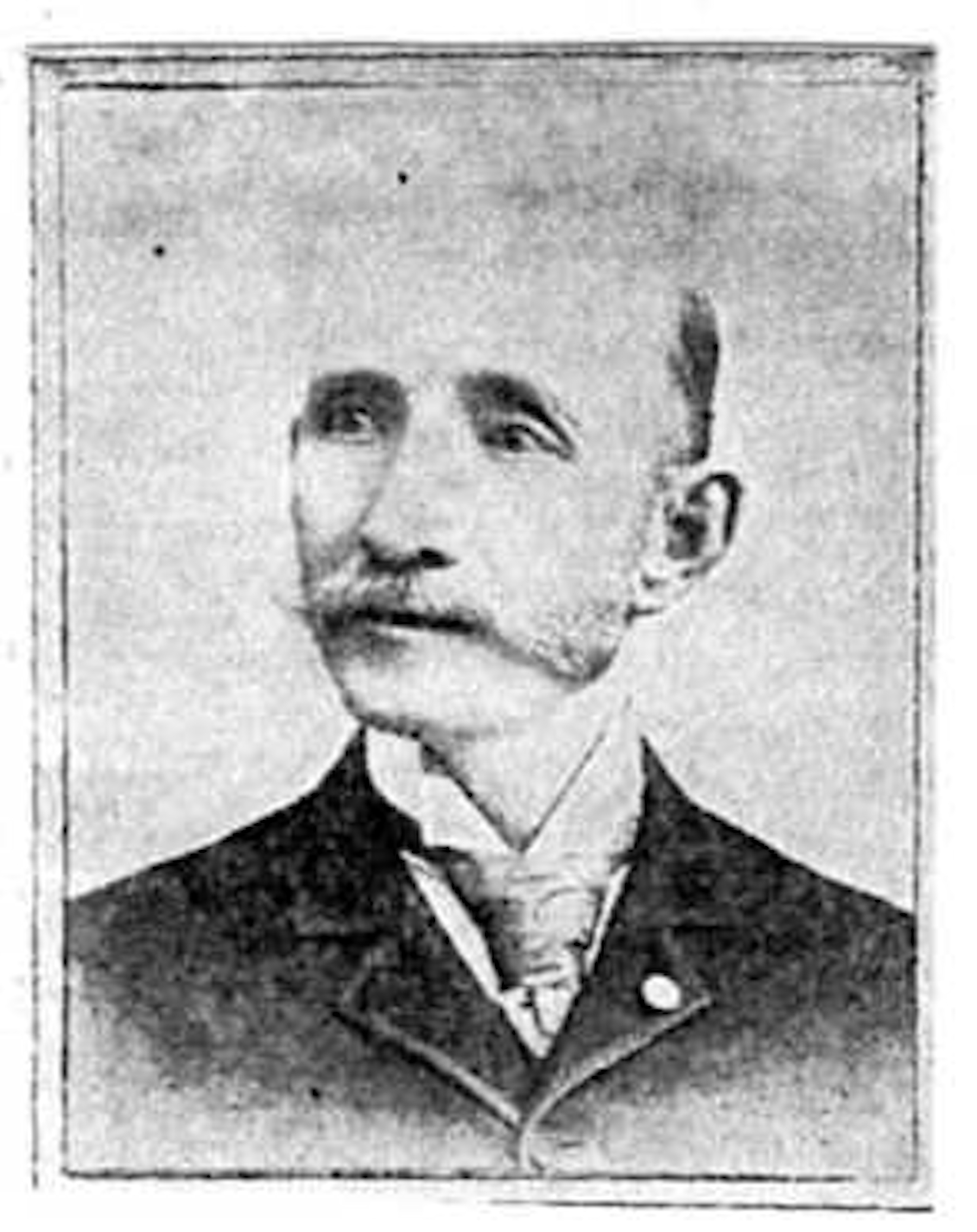
- Medal of Honor recipient Edmund English (1891) (portrait used in Deeds of Valor by Beyer).
- Born: November 16, 1841; Cappawhite, Tipperary, Ireland
- Died: May 27, 1912 (aged 70); Philadelphia, Pennsylvania, US
- Burial place: Old Cathedral Cemetery, Philadelphia, Pennsylvania
- Military career
- Allegiance: United States of America; Union
- Branch: United States Army; Union Army
- Service years: 1861–1866
- Rank: First Sergeant First Lieutenant
- Units: Company C, 2nd New Jersey Volunteer Infantry
- Conflicts: American Civil War; *Battle of the Wilderness
- Awards: Medal of Honor

Edmund English (November 16, 1841 – May 27, 1912) was a Union Army soldier who received the Medal of Honor for his bravery at the Battle of the Wilderness in the American Civil War.

== Biography ==
Edmund English was born in Cappawhite Tipperary Ireland, on November 16, 1841, the seventh of eight children of Thomas English (1795–1874) and Anne Nancy Hogan (1793–1888). They immigrated to the United States around the time of the famine to New York but were in Philadelphia by the 1850 census.

=== Military service ===
After the outbreak of the Civil War, he enlisted in the 2nd New Jersey Volunteer Infantry, and was mustered in as a corporal in Company C on May 27, 1861. He served with his regiment, which was part of the famed First New Jersey Brigade, as it fought in June–July 1862 Seven Days Battles, August 1862 Battle of Second Bull Run, and September 15, 1862, Battle of South Mountain. On July 21, 1862, he received promotion to sergeant, which was followed by a September 21, 1862, promotion to 1st sergeant of his company.

From December 12 to 15, English and the 2nd New Jersey fought at the Battle of Fredericksburg. After the winter encampment and the infamous Mud March, in January 1863, English and the 2nd fought were reorganized into the 1st Brigade of the 1st Division of VI Corps with whom they would serve to the war's end. In May, they fought in the Chancellorsville Campaign seeing action at the Second Battle of Fredericksburg May 3–4 where they took the stonewall that had stopped them almost five months before.

During the ensuing Gettysburg campaign, they saw action on the first and third days. English and the 2nd continued with the Army of the Potomac through the Bristoe, Mine Run, and Overland Campaigns. It was during the Battle of the Wilderness, Virginia (May 6, 1864), he performed his act of bravery that garnered him the Medal of Honor.

In 1905, W. F. Beyer wrote in Deeds of Valor:

During this mad rush for the rear the Second New Jersey, along with other regiments, had been ordered to fall back. The command aroused Sergeant English's indignation. Is there nobody to make a stand? he exclaimed. “This is disgraceful!”

He decided to act on his own responsibility, even though it be insubordination. Quickly he seized the colors of his regiment, placed himself in front of the men, waved the colors high in the air and shouted: “Here, boys! Stand here! At least a few of us should stem the tide!”

His bravery was infectious; the men caught his spirit and one by one rallied around the flag, till at last quite a little band was gathered about the sergeant. They did not only “stem the tide,” but repulsed and drove the Confederates back in wild confusion.

He was eventually captured by the Confederates at the Battle of the Bloody Angle at Spotsylvania and was paroled the following February at Petersburg. It was as a paroled prisoner that he was formally discharged at Trenton, New Jersey, on February 28, 1865, much later than his official end of his term of service, which was in June 1864.

He later re-enlisted in Winfield S. Hancock's Corps of veteran volunteers, serving first as sergeant major of the 6th United States Veteran Volunteers. Later, he was promoted to first lieutenant and transferred to the 7th United States Veteran Volunteers. He was mustered out of Federal service on July 23, 1866, having served over 5 full years.

=== Postwar life ===
After the war, he returned to Philadelphia and opened a grocery market in Philadelphia. In 1866, he married Elizabeth "Lizzie" M. Mahaffy (1845–1868), a fellow Irish immigrant from Ulster. He moved in with her family. He and Lizzie had two daughters who did not survive infancy, and Lizzie died in 1868. In 1869, he married her younger sister, Jane Anastasia Mahaffy (1846–1899). With her, he had three daughters and two sons of whom Francis Xavier English (1874–1935), Anne Estella English(1875–1941), and Agnes Hortense English (1876–1897) survived to adulthood.

By the 1880 census, they were residing at 1129th Ellsworth St, in Philadelphia with her parents, Charles and Annie Mahaffy, her sister, Susan Mahaffy, and Francis, Annie, and Agnes.

The ongoing review of official War Records by the War Department in the second half of the nineteenth century led to English's nomination for the Medal of Honor. His medal was awarded to him on February 13, 1891.

On April 13, 1897, Jane and Edmund lost their youngest daughter Agnes. On March 5, 1899, Jane died. Edmund continued on running the grocery store with Francis and Anne. On May 31, 1912, Edmund English died, survived by his son and daughter, in Philadelphia, Pennsylvania, and was buried in the Old Cathedral Cemetery.

== Medal of Honor citation ==
Rank and organization: First Sergeant, Company C, 2d New Jersey Infantry. Place and date: At Wilderness, Va., May 6, 1864. Entered service at: Newark, N.J. Born: November 16, 1841, Ireland. Date of issue: February 13, 1891.

Citation:

The President of the United States of America, in the name of Congress, takes pleasure in presenting the Medal of Honor to First Sergeant Edmund English, United States Army, for extraordinary heroism on 6 May 1864, while serving with Company C, 2d New Jersey Infantry, in action during the Wilderness Campaign, Virginia. During a rout and while under orders to retreat First Sergeant English seized the colors, rallied the men, and drove the enemy back.

== See also ==
- Tipperary
- Irish Famine
- List of Medal of Honor recipients
- List of American Civil War Medal of Honor recipients: A–F
- Battle of Second Bull Run
- Battle of South Mountain
- Battle of Fredericksburg
- Mud March
- Chancellorsville Campaign
- Second Battle of Fredericksburg
- Gettysburg campaign
- Bristoe campaign
- Mine Run Campaign
- Overland Campaign
- Battle of the Wilderness
- Battle of the Bloody Angle
- Battle of Spotsylvania Court House
- paroled
- Veteran Reserve Corps
