= Michael Madden (Medal of Honor) =

American Civil War Medal of Honor recipient

- Born: September 28, 1841; Limerick, Ireland
- Died: August 7, 1920 (aged 78); Harrisburg, Pennsylvania
- Burial place: Mount Calvary Catholic Cemetery Harrisburg, Pennsylvania
- Military career
- Allegiance: United States; Union
- Branch: United States Army; Union Army
- Service years: 1861–1864
- Rank: Private
- Units: (New York (state)) Company K, 42nd New York Volunteer Infantry Regiment
- Conflicts: American Civil War
- Awards: Medal of Honor

Michael Madden (September 28, 1841 – August 7, 1920) was a private in the United States Army and a Medal of Honor recipient for his role with the 42nd New York Infantry of the Union Army in the American Civil War.

Madden was born in Limerick, Ireland, and emigrated to the United States at age 14.

Madden enlisted in the Army from New York City in June 1861, and was mustered out in July 1864.

After the war, he lived in Harrisburg, Pennsylvania, where he was a car inspector for the Pennsylvania Railroad. He died at his home in Harrisburg in 1920. Madden is buried in Mount Calvary Catholic Cemetery in Harrisburg, Pennsylvania. His grave is located in Section O, Lot 165.

== Medal of Honor citation ==
Rank and organization: Private, Company K, 42d New York Infantry.
Place and date: At Masons Island, Md., September 3, 1861.
Entered service at: New York, N.Y.
Born: September 28, 1841, Ireland.
Date of issue: March 22, 1898.

Citation:

Assisted a wounded comrade to the riverbank and, under heavy fire of the enemy, swam with him across a branch of the Potomac to the Union lines.

== See also ==
- List of Medal of Honor recipients
- List of American Civil War Medal of Honor recipients: M–P
