= James Brogan (Medal of Honor) =

Irish-born US Army Medal of Honor recipient (1834–1908)

Edward James Brogan
- Born: c. 1834; County Donegal, Ireland
- Died: October 30, 1908 (aged 73–74)
- Military career
- Allegiance: United States of America
- Branch: United States Army
- Service years: 1864–1880
- Rank: Sergeant
- Units: 21st Pennsylvania Cavalry; 6th U.S. Cavalry
- Conflicts: American Civil War; Indian Wars
- Awards: Medal of Honor

Edward James Brogan (c. 1834 – October 30, 1908) was a United States Army soldier who served in the American Indian Wars. He received the Medal of Honor for his service.

Brogan was born in County Donegal, Ireland, and later moved to Summit Hill, Pennsylvania. He joined the army in January 1864, and served with the 21st Pennsylvania Cavalry during the American Civil War. By the time of his Medal of Honor action, he was serving as a sergeant in the 6th Cavalry Regiment.

== Medal of Honor citation ==
Rank and organization: Sergeant, Company G, 6th U.S. Cavalry.
Place and date: At Simon Valley, Ariz., December 14, 1877.
Entered service at: ------ Birth: Ireland.
Date of issue: January 9, 1880.

Engaged singlehanded 2 renegade Indians until his horse was shot under him and then pursued them so long as he was able.
