= James B. Bell =

American soldier (1835–1910)

- Born: August 9, 1835; Branot, Ohio, US
- Died: June 30, 1910 (aged 74)
- Military career
- Allegiance: United States
- Branch: US Army
- Rank: Sergeant
- Unit: 11th Regiment Ohio Volunteer Infantry - Company H
- Conflicts: Battle of Missionary Ridge
- Awards: Medal of Honor

James Bennett Bell (August 9, 1835 – June 30, 1910) was an American soldier who fought in the American Civil War and a recipient of the U.S. military's highest decoration, the Medal of Honor, for his actions at the Battle of Missionary Ridge on November 25, 1863.

Bell died on June 30, 1910.

== Medal of Honor citation ==
Though severely wounded, was first of his regiment on the summit of the ridge, planted his colors inside the enemy's works, and did not leave the field until after he had been wounded five times.

== See also ==
- List of American Civil War Medal of Honor recipients: A–F
