= Benjamin F. Stewart =

- Born: 1851; Norfolk, Virginia, US
- Military career
- Allegiance: United States
- Branch: United States Army
- Service years: 1875–1876
- Rank: Private
- Units: Company E, 7th U.S. Infantry
- Conflicts: Indian Wars
- Awards: Medal of Honor

Benjamin F. Stewart (born 1851) was a private in the United States Army who received the Medal of Honor for his actions during the Indian Wars.

== Biography ==
Benjamin Stewart was born in 1851 in Norfolk, Virginia, and enlisted in the Army from Newport, Kentucky, in May 1875. He served as a private in Company E, 7th U.S. Infantry during the American Indian Wars. He received the Medal of Honor on December 2, 1876, for his actions at Little Big Horn River, Montana, on July 9, 1876. He was discharged due to physical disability later that month.

== Medal of Honor ==
Rank and organization: Private, Company E, 7th U.S. Infantry. Place and date: At Big Horn River, Mont., 9 July 1876. Entered service at: ------. Birth: Norfolk, Va. Date of issue: 2 December 1876.

Citation:

Carried dispatches to Gen. Crook at imminent risk of his life.

== See also ==
- List of Medal of Honor recipients: Indian Wars
