= William Ahern (Medal of Honor) =

US Navy sailor and Medal of Honor recipient

- Born: 1861; Ireland
- Died: November 7, 1916 (aged 54–55); Brooklyn, New York
- Burial place: Holy Cross Cemetery, Brooklyn
- Military career
- Allegiance: United States of America
- Branch: United States Navy
- Rank: Watertender
- Unit: USS Puritan (BM-1)
- Awards: Medal of Honor

William Ahern (1861 – November 7, 1916) was a sailor in the United States Navy who received the Medal of Honor for valor during an engineering crisis that threatened his ship.

== Biography ==
Ahern was born in Ireland in 1861 and entered the Navy in New York. On July 1, 1897, he was serving aboard the USS Puritan as a watertender when the crown sheets on one of her boilers collapsed. Ahern entered the fire room with his face and arms wrapped in wet cloths, crawling over the other boilers to close a valve disconnecting the boiler from the remaining boilers, preventing further damage.

== Medal of Honor citation ==
Rank and organization: Watertender, U.S. Navy. Born: 1861, Ireland. Accredited to: New York. G.O. No.: 482, November 1, 1897.

Citation:

On board the U.S.S. Puritan at the time of the collapse of one of the crown sheets of boiler E of that vessel, 1 July 1897. Wrapped in wet cloths to protect his face and arms, William Ahern entered the fireroom, crawled over the tops of the boilers and closed the auxiliary stop valve, disconnecting boiler E and removing the danger of disabling the other boilers.

== William O'Hearn ==
In newspaper reports his name is given as "William O'Hearn": Chicago Tribune June 3, 1898; Oakland Tribune May 20, 1898; New York Times February 6, 1898.
