= 11th Ohio Infantry Regiment =

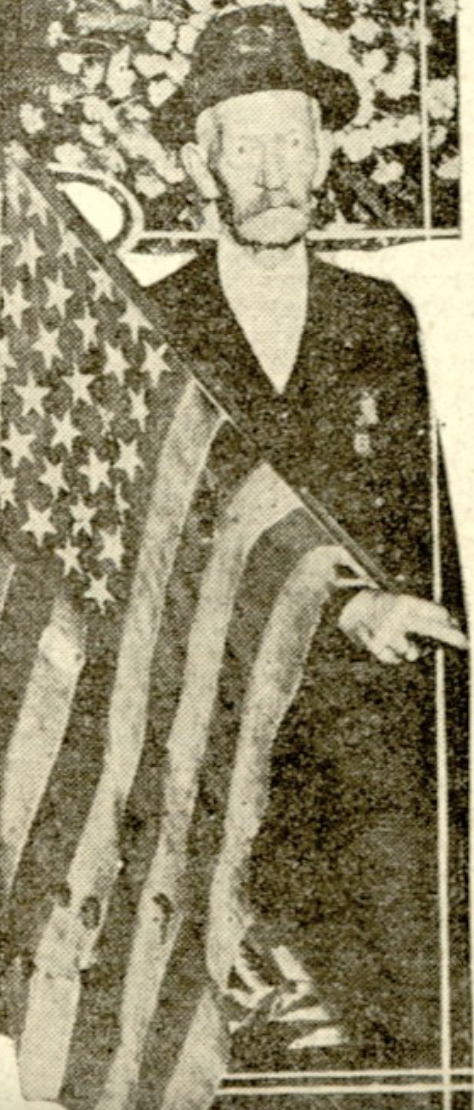
- National color of the regiment
- Active: April 18, 1861, to July 20, 1861 (3 months); June 20, 1861, to June 11, 1865 (3 years)
- Country: United States
- Allegiance: Union
- Branch: Infantry
- Engagements: Battle of Scary Creek; Battle of Second Bull Run; Battle of South Mountain; Battle of Antietam; Tullahoma Campaign; Battle of Chickamauga; Siege of Chattanooga; Battle of Missionary Ridge; Battle of Buzzard's Roost Gap; Atlanta campaign; Battle of Resaca; Battle of Kennesaw Mountain; Battle of Peachtree Creek; Siege of Atlanta; Battle of Jonesboro; Battle of Lovejoy's Station; Sherman's March to the Sea; Carolinas Campaign; Battle of Bentonville

The 11th Ohio Infantry Regiment was an infantry regiment in the Union Army during the American Civil War.

== Service ==
=== Three-months regiment ===
The 11th Ohio Infantry Regiment was organized at Camp Dennison near Cincinnati, Ohio, from April 18–26, 1861 under Colonel Charles A. De Villiers in response to President Lincoln's call for 75,000 volunteers. The regiment spent its entire service on duty at Camp Dennison until June 20, 1861. The regiment mustered out on July 20, 1861.

=== Three-years regiment ===
The 11th Ohio Infantry was reorganized at Camp Dennison on June 20, 1861, and mustered in for three years service under the command of Colonel A. H. Coleman.

The regiment was attached to Cox's Kanawha Brigade, West Virginia, to September 1861. Benham's Brigade, District of the Kanawha, West Virginia, to October 1861. 1st Brigade, District of the Kanawha, to March 1862. 1st Brigade, Kanawha Division, West Virginia, Department of the Mountains, to September 1862. 1st Brigade, Kanawha Division, IX Corps, Army of the Potomac, to October 1862. 1st Brigade, Kanawha Division, District of West Virginia, Department of the Ohio, to February 1863. Crook's Brigade, Baird's Division, Army of Kentucky, Department of the Cumberland, to June 1863. 3rd Brigade, 4th Division, XIV Corps, Army of the Cumberland, to October 1863. 1st Brigade, 3rd Division, XIV Army Corps, to June 1865.

The regiment veteranized June 21, 1864, and was reorganized as a battalion, attached to the 92nd Ohio Infantry until January 1865. The 11th Ohio Infantry mustered out of service on June 11, 1865.

== Detailed service ==
=== 1861 ===
Ordered to the Kanawha Valley, Va., July 7, 1861. Action at Hawk's Nest, Va., August 20, 1861. Near Piggott's Mills, Big Run, August 25. Operations in the Kanawha Valley and New River Reglen October 19-November 16. Gauley Bridge November 10. Blake's Farm, Cotton Mountain, November 10–11. Moved to Point Pleasant December 11, and duty there until April 16, 1862.

=== 1862 ===
Operations in the Kanawha Valley April to August. Moved to Washington, D.C., August 18–24. Pope's Campaign in northern Virginia August 25-September 2. Bull Run Bridge August 27. Maryland Campaign September 6–22. Frederick City, Md., September 12. Battle of South Mountain September 14. Battle of Antietam September 16–17. Moved to Hagerstown, Md., October 8, thence to Clarksburg and Summerville, W. Va., and duty at Summerville until January 24, 1863. Expedition to Cold Knob Mountain November 24–30, 1862. Lewis Mill on Sinking Creek November 26.

=== 1863 ===
Ordered to Nashville, Tenn., January 24, 1863, thence to Carthage February 22, and duty there until June. Near Carthage March 8 (2 companies). Scout to Rome March 24–25. Reconnaissance to McMinnville April 13. Tullahoma Campaign June 23-July 7. Hoover's Gap June 24–26. Occupation of middle Tennessee until August 16. Passage of Cumberland Mountains and Tennessee River and Chickamauga Campaign August 16-September 22. Catlett's Gap, Pigeon Mountain, September 15–18. Battle of Chickamauga September 19–21. Rossville Gap September 21. Siege of Chattanooga September 24-November 23. Reopening Tennessee River October 26–29. Brown's Ferry October 27. Chattanooga-Ringgold Campaign November 23–27. Orchard Knob November 23–24. Missionary Ridge November 25.

=== 1864 ===
Demonstration on Dalton, Ga., February 22–27, 1864. Tunnel Hill, Buzzard's Roost Gap and Rocky Faced Ridge February 23–25. Veterans absent on furlough March and April. Atlanta Campaign May to September. Demonstrations on Rocky Faced Ridge May 8–11. Battle of Resaca May 14–15. Detached for duty as garrison at Resaca May 16 to June 10. Non-veterans relieved for muster out June 10 and ordered to Cincinnati, Ohio. Mustered out June 21, 1864.

== Post Disbanding ==
=== 1864 ===
Veterans and recruits organized as a battalion and attached to 92nd Ohio Infantry until January 1865, participating in operations about Marietta, Ga., and against Kennesaw Mountain June 10-July 2, 1864. Pine Hill June 11–14. Lost Mountain June 15–17. Assault on Kennesaw June 27. Smyrna Camp Ground July 4. Chattahoochie River July 5–17. Peachtree Creek July 19–20. Siege of Atlanta July 22-August 25. Utoy Creek August 5–7. Flank movement on Jonesboro August 25–30. Battle of Jonesboro August 31-September 1. Lovejoy's Station September 2–6. Operations against Hood in northern Georgia and northern Alabama September 29-November 3. March to the Sea November 15-December 10. Siege of Savannah December 10–21.

=== 1865 ===
Campaign of the Carolinas January to April 1865. Fayetteville, N. C., March 11. Battle of Bentonville March 19–21. Occupation of Goldsboro March 24. Advance on Raleigh April 10–14. Occupation of Raleigh April 14, Bennett's House April 26. Surrender of Johnston and his army. March to Washington, D.C., via Richmond, Va., April 29-May 20. Grand Review of the Armies May 24.

== Casualties ==
The regiment lost a total of 152 men during service; 4 officers and 50 enlisted men killed or mortally wounded, 98 enlisted men died of disease.

== Commanders ==
- Colonel Charles A. De Villiers
- Colonel A. H. Coleman
- Colonel Philander Parmele Lane
- Colonel Ogden Street
- Lieutenant Colonel Augustus H. Coleman - commanded at the battle of Antietam and killed in action
- Major Lyman Jackson - commanded at the battle of Antietam following the death of Ltc Coleman

== Notable members ==
- Sergeant James B. Bell, Company H - Medal of Honor recipient for action at the battle of Missionary Ridge, November 25, 1863
- Corporal George Green, Company H - Medal of Honor recipient for action at the battle of Missionary Ridge, November 25, 1863
- Private Hiram Reese Howard, Company H - Medal of Honor recipient for action at the battle of Missionary Ridge, November 25, 1863

== See also ==
- List of Ohio Civil War units
- Ohio in the Civil War
