= 2017–18 KBL season =

KBL
- Season: 2017–18
- Dates: 14 October 2017 – 18 April 2018
- Games played: 54
- Teams: 10
- TV partner: MBC Sports+

Regular season
- Season MVP: Doo Kyung-min (Wonju DB Promy)

Finals
- Champions: Seoul SK Knights (2nd title)
- Runners-up: Wonju DB Promy
- Playoffs MVP: Terrico White (Seoul SK Knights)

The 2017–18 KBL season was the 22nd season of the Korean Basketball League (KBL), the highest level of basketball in South Korea. The regular season began play on 14 October 2017 and ended on 13 March 2018, with the play-offs beginning several days after. Seoul SK Knights won its second KBL championship.

== Regular season ==
Pos	Team	Pld	W	L	PCT	Qualification or relegation
1	Wonju DB Promy	54	37	17	.685	Qualification to semi-finals
2	Seoul SK Knights	54	36	18	.667	Qualification to semi-finals
3	Jeonju KCC Egis	54	35	19	.648	Qualification to quarter-finals
4	Ulsan Hyundai Mobis Phoebus	54	33	21	.611	Qualification to quarter-finals
5	Anyang KGC	54	29	25	.537	Qualification to quarter-finals
6	Incheon Electroland Elephants	54	29	25	.537	Qualification to quarter-finals
7	Seoul Samsung Thunders	54	25	29	.463	
8	Goyang Orion Orions	54	19	35	.352	
9	Changwon LG Sakers	54	17	37	.315	
10	Busan KT Sonicboom	54	10	44	.185	

Source: Asia-Basket

== Playoffs ==
Quarter-finals
4 Ulsan Hyundai Mobis Phoebus	1
5 Anyang KGC	3
3 Jeonju KCC Egis	3
6 Incheon Electroland Elephants	2

Semi-finals
1 Wonju DB Promy	3
5 Anyang KGC	0
2 Seoul SK Knights	3
3 Jeonju KCC Egis	1

Final
1 Wonju DB Promy	2
2 Seoul SK Knights	4

== Individual awards ==
=== Yearly awards ===
- Most Valuable Player: Doo Kyung-min (Wonju DB Promy)
- Foreign Player of the Year: Deonte Burton (Wonju DB Promy)
- Coach of the Year: Lee Sang-beom (Wonju DB Promy)
- Rookie of the Year: An Young-jun (Seoul SK Knights)
- KBL Best 5
  - Doo Kyung-min (Wonju DB Promy)
  - Lee Jung-hyun (Jeonju KCC Egis)
  - Deonte Burton (Wonju DB Promy)
  - Aaron Haynes (Seoul SK Knights)
  - Oh Se-keun (Anyang KGC)
- Sixth Man Award: Kim Joo-sung (Wonju DB Promy)
- Skill Development Award: Kim Tae-hong (Wonju DB Promy)
- Defensive Best 5
  - Park Chan-hee (Incheon Electroland Elephants)
  - Lee Dae-sung (Ulsan Hyundai Mobis Phoebus)
  - Yang Hee-jong (Anyang KGC)
  - Song Kyo-chang (Jeonju KCC Egis)
  - Oh Se-keun (Anyang KGC)
- Defensive Player of the Year: Park Chan-hee (Incheon Electroland Elephants)
- Fair Play Award: Choi Bu-kyung (Seoul SK Knights)

=== Individual statistic leaders ===
Category	Player	Team	Statistics
PPG (O)	(United States) David Simon	Anyang KGC	25.7
PPG (D)	Oh Se-keun	Anyang KGC	18.7
RPG (O)	(United States) Ricardo Ratliffe	Seoul Samsung Thunders	13.6
RPG (D)	Oh Se-keun	Anyang KGC	8.9
APG	(South Korea) Kim Si-rae	Changwon LG Sakers	6.5
SPG	(United States) Brandon Brown	Incheon Electroland Elephants	2.0
BPG	(United States) David Simon	Anyang KGC	2.1
FG%	(United States) Vernon Macklin	Goyang Orion Orions	63.7%
FT%	(United States) Reyshawn Terry	Ulsan Hyundai Mobis Phoebus	84.3%
3FG%	(South Korea) Cha Ba-wee	Incheon Electroland Elephants	44.8%

=== Round MVP ===
The following players were named MVP of the Round:

- Round 1: Oh Se-keun (Anyang KGC)
- Round 2: Ricardo Ratliffe (Seoul Samsung Thunders)
- Round 3: Oh Se-keun (Anyang KGC)
- Round 4: Doo Kyung-min (Wonju DB Promy)
- Round 5: Brandon Brown (Incheon Electroland Elephants)
- Round 6: Aaron Haynes (Seoul SK Knights)

== See also ==
- 2017 Korean Basketball League draft
