= Lee Dae-sung =

South Korean basketball player

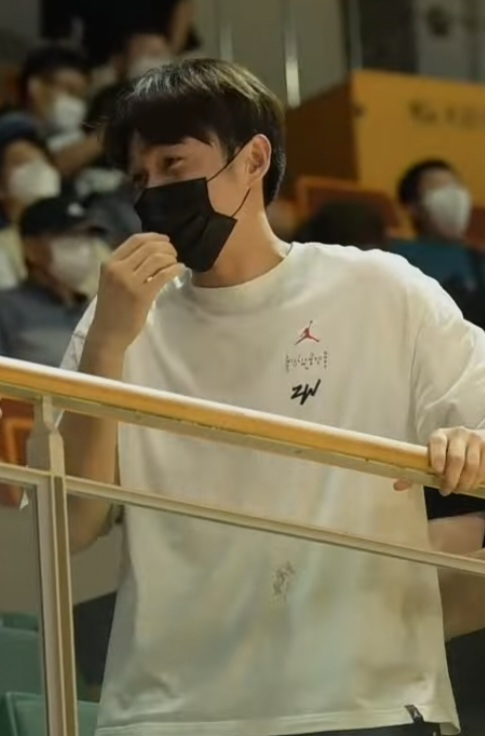
- Lee in 2023

No. 43 – Seoul Samsung Thunders
- Position: Guard
- League: KBL

Personal information
- Born: May 30, 1990 (age 36) Seoul, South Korea
- Listed height: 6 ft 4 in (1.93 m)
- Listed weight: 203 lb (92 kg)

Career information
- High school: Samil Commercial (Suwon, South Korea)
- College: Chung-Ang University; BYU–Hawaii (2012-2013)
- KBL draft: 2013: 2nd round, 1st overall pick
- Playing career: 2013–present

Career history
- 2013–2017: Ulsan Hyundai Mobis Phoebus
- 2015–2017: → Sangmu (loan)
- 2017: Erie BayHawks
- 2017–2019: Ulsan Hyundai Mobis Phoebus
- 2019–2020: Jeonju KCC Egis
- 2020–2022: Goyang Orion Orions
- 2022–2023: Daegu KOGAS Pegasus
- 2023–2024: SeaHorses Mikawa
- 2024–present: Seoul Samsung Thunders

Career highlights
- 3× KBL Championship (2014, 2015, 2019); KBL regular season champion (2019); KBL Playoffs MVP (2019); 2× KBL Best 5 (2021, 2022)

- Korean name
- Hangul: 이대성
- Hanja: 李大成
- RR: I Daeseong
- MR: I Taesŏng

Lee Dae-sung (born 30 May 1990) is a South Korean professional basketball player. He plays for Seoul Samsung Thunders in the Korean Basketball League and the South Korean national team.

== Early life ==
Lee is a graduate of Samil Commercial High School, one of the province's most notable high school basketball programs. One of his contemporaries was Kim Min-goo, a year his junior, and they led the team to win the 2008 National High School Basketball Championship. He was named tournament MVP and won the Best Defensive Player award.

== College career ==
Lee went on to Chung-Ang University where he was roommates with Kim Sun-hyung, his future national teammate. In January 2012, he transferred to Brigham Young University–Hawaii as a junior in hopes of entering the NBA and spent the 2012–13 season playing for the Seasiders in the NCAA Division II, averaging 5 points and 2 assists. He later admitted that the decision to go to the United States was also partly motivated by his desire to escape the strict hierarchical culture of Korean college basketball.

== Professional career ==
=== Ulsan Hyundai Mobis Phoebus and Erie BayHawks (2013–2019) ===
Lee returned to South Korea to begin his professional career. He was drafted first in the second round of the 2013 rookie draft by Ulsan Hyundai Mobis Phoebus. With veteran stalwart Yang Dong-geun already in his mid-thirties, Lee was given considerably more playing time, compared to other first-year rookies that season, as Mobis Phoebus won the championship.

Lee enlisted for mandatory military service in April 2015 and joined the Sangmu team after completing basic training. He was discharged in January 2017.

Lee joined the 2017 NBA G League draft and was picked by Erie BayHawks. He averaged 2.5 points 0.9 rebounds and 1.1assists.

Lee recorded 14.1 points, 2.8 rebounds, 3.6 assists, and 1.5 steals per game in the 2018-19 KBL season for Mobis Phoebus, winning both the championship and the regular season title. During the play-offs, he averaged 16.2 points and 3.6 assists and was named play-offs MVP. He also took part in the qualification of the team to the 2019 FIBA Asia Champions Cup in Bangkok and averaged 4.7 points, 4.7 rebounds and 4 assists at the championship.

=== Jeonju KCC Egis (2019–2020) ===
With one year still left on his contract, Lee and teammate Ra Gun-ah joined Jeonju KCC Egis in a trade for four other players ahead of the 2019–20 season. He was unable to replicate his form from the previous season and was released as a free agent.

=== Goyang Orion Orions (2020–2022) ===
Lee nearly signed with Busan KT Sonicboom but joined Goyang Orion Orions after contract negotiations broke down. After a strong performance in the pre-season KBL Cup competition, he quickly established himself as a mainstay in his new team. In the October game against his former team Ulsan Hyundai Mobis Phoebus, he put up a career-best 34 points, scoring 14 out of 15 free throws. He was voted into the KBL Best 5 for the first time in his career. As his wife was about to give birth, he did not attend the awards ceremony and his Orion teammate Heo Il-young received the award on his behalf.

During the 2021–22 season, Lee was paired together with rookie guard Lee Jung-hyun. The backcourt pairing played a major role in the Orions qualifying for the playoffs and defeating Ulsan Hyundai Mobis Phoebus to advance to the semi-finals for the first time in five years; unfortunately they were defeated by eventual champions Seoul SK Knights. The younger Lee would be nominated for the Rookie of the Year award while Lee Dae-sung himself finished the season as the top-scoring domestic player and was voted into the KBL Best 5 for a second consecutive time. He scored 20 or more points in 18 games during the regular season, only behind Wonju DB Promy shooting guard Heo Ung; it was the first time since the 2010–11 season any domestic player has scored 20 or more points in this many games.

=== Daegu KOGAS Pegasus (2022–2023) ===
With the Orions facing uncertainty due to its ownership pulling out, Lee decided not to see out his contract and signed with Daegu KOGAS Pegasus.

=== SeaHorses Mikawa(2023-present) ===
On July 5, 2023, Lee signed with SeaHorses Mikawa of the Japanese B.League.

== National team career ==
Lee was first called up to the senior national team in 2017. The presence of veterans Lee Jung-hyun, Kim Sun-hyung and Park Chan-hee and emergence of Heo Hoon and Kim Nak-hyeon relegated him to the reserves but his versatility in both guard positions made him valuable as a back-up option. After participating in the qualifiers, he made the final 12-man squad for the 2019 FIBA Basketball World Cup where he averaged 10 points, 2 rebounds and 1.3 assist at the tournament.

With the older players from the 2019 World Cup retiring from the national team, Lee played a bigger role in the national team. He was named in the preliminary squad for the 2022 FIBA Asia Cup and made the final 12-man team. Under new coach Choo Il-seung's fast-paced offense, Lee rotated with Heo as the team's main ballhandler to great effect. Heo's injury during training and the latter's older brother Heo Ung contracting COVID-19 left Lee as the only available guard on the roster ahead of the quarterfinal against New Zealand. During the third quarter of the game, he was ejected after being whistled for his second technical foul; with stretch four Choi Jun-yong also ejected for accumulated fouls, South Korea was forced to play the rest of the game without any guards or main ballhandlers and lost to the Tall Blacks at the last minute.

== Personal life ==
Lee married his university sweetheart Son Geun-hye in May 2019 after a nine-year courtship. Their daughter was born in April 2021.
