= U-League =

The U-League, officially KUSF College Sports U-League (Korean: KUSF 대학스포츠 U-리그), is operated by the Korea University Sports Federation (KUSF), the organization which oversees college sports in South Korea. The KUSF U-League operates in six different sports which students from member institutions participate in.

The U-League's intended purpose is:

- Guarantee the right to learn and improve performance through the operation of the university sports league
- Creating a culture of participation by university members and raising awareness of university sports by hosting home and away games on university campuses in a league system

== Sports ==
- Baseball — men
- Basketball — men & women
- Football — men
- Ice hockey — men
- Soft tennis
- Volleyball — men & women

== Competition format ==
The U-League operates in a league format which mirrors the leagues in domestic professional sport. The season follows the academic calendar, starting around February or March and ending in November.

== Member institutions ==
The following member institutions participate in the U-League. Some institutions may also sponsor other sports which compete in KUSF-sanctioned competitions outside the U-League system, or sponsor a below-mentioned sport but only as an extracurricular club.

Institution	Location	Type	Sports					
Institution	Location	Type	Baseball	Basketball	Football	Ice hockey	Soft tennis	Volleyball
Ajou University	Suwon	Private	No	No	Yes	No	No	No
Busan University of Foreign Studies	Busan	Private	No	No	Yes	No	No	No
Chodang University	Muan County	Private	No	No	Yes	No	No	No
Chosun University	Gwangju	Private	No	Yes (Note: Only men's team)	Yes	No	No	Yes
Chung-Ang University	Seoul	Private	Yes	Yes	Yes	No	No	No
Chungbuk National University	Cheongju	Public	No	No	No	No	Yes	No
Chungnam National University	Daejeon	Public	No	No	No	No	No	Yes
Dankook University	Seoul	Private	Yes	Yes	Yes	No	No	Yes (Note: Only women's team)
Dong-a University	Busan	Private	Yes	No	Yes	No	No	No
Dong-Eui University	Busan	Private	Yes	No	Yes	No	No	No
Dongguk University	Seoul	Private	Yes	Yes	Yes	No	No	No
Gangdong University	Eumseong County	Private	No	No	Yes	No	No	No
Gwangju University	Gwangju	Private	No	Yes	Yes	No	No	No
Gyeongsang National University	Jinju	Public	No	No	No	No	No	Yes
Hankyong National University	Anseong	Public	No	No	No	No	Yes	No
Hanyang University	Seoul	Private	Yes	Yes	Yes	No	No	Yes
Hongik University	Seoul	Private	Yes	No	Yes	No	No	Yes
Howon University	Gunsan	Private	Yes	No	Yes	No	No	No
Incheon National University	Incheon	Public	No	No	Yes	No	No	No
Inha University	Incheon	Private	Yes	No	No	No	Yes	Yes
Jeonju University	Jeonju	Private	No	No	Yes	No	No	No
Keimyung University	Daegu	Private	Yes	No	No	No	No	No
Konkuk University	Seoul	Private	Yes	Yes	Yes	No	No	No
Kongju National University	Gongju	Public	No	No	No	No	Yes	No
Korea University	Seoul	Private	Yes	Yes	Yes	Yes	No	No
Kunsan National University	Gunsan	Public	No	No	No	No	Yes	No
Kwangwoon University	Seoul	Private	No	No	Yes	Yes	No	No
Kyonggi University	Suwon	Private	No	No	Yes	No	No	Yes
Kyung Hee University	Seoul	Private	Yes	Yes	Yes	Yes	No	Yes
Mokpo National University	Mokpo	Public	No	No	No	No	No	Yes
Myongji University	Seoul	Private	No	Yes	Yes	No	No	Yes
Pai Chai University	Daejeon	Private	No	No	Yes	No	No	No
Pusan National University	Busan	Public	No	Yes	No	No	No	No
Sangji University	Wonju	Private	No	No	Yes	No	No	No
Sangmyung University	Seoul	Private	No	Yes	No	No	No	No
Sehan University	Yeongam County	Private	Yes	No	No	No	No	No
Seoul National University	Seoul	Public	Yes	No	Yes	No	No	No
Soongsil University	Seoul	Private	No	No	Yes	No	No	No
Sunchon National University	Suncheon	Public	No	No	No	No	Yes	No
Sun Moon University	Asan	Private	No	No	Yes	No	No	No
Sungkyunkwan University	Seoul	Private	Yes	Yes	Yes	No	No	Yes
University of Suwon	Hwaseong	Private	No	Yes	Yes	No	No	No
University of Ulsan	Ulsan	Private	No	Yes	Yes	No	No	No
Woosuk University	Wanju County	Private	No	No	Yes	No	No	Yes
Yeoju Institute of Technology	Yeoju	Private	No	No	Yes	No	No	No
Yeungnam University	Gyeongnam	Private	Yes	No	Yes	No	No	No
Yong In University	Yongin	Private	No	No	Yes	No	No	No
Yonsei University	Seoul	Private	Yes	Yes	Yes	Yes	No	No

== KUSF Club Championship ==
The U-League is considered to be the "elite" competition, with the majority of participating student-athletes turning professional and often appearing for the South Korea national team at international competitions. The KUSF runs a separate tournament for college sports club teams composed of students who wish to play sports but not at the elite level. The KUSF Club Championship is contested in four team sports: baseball, basketball, volleyball and football (soccer).

== History ==
The KUSF U-League was first established for football in 2008 before being expanded to other sports and becoming the present-day U-League system. It streamlined college competitions into a league/play-off format mirroring professional leagues. The U-League's establishment also meant that member institutions were required to provide academic support for their enrolled student-athletes and shifting admissions policies to include academics, instead of admitting a student based solely on athletic performance while ignoring academic results.

The KUSF U-League system was established during a period of time when there was much criticism over enrolled students (especially middle and high school students) being forced to choose between their studies and athletic pursuits, with students either graduating with bare minimum grades or dropping out altogether. The criticism was particularly directed towards the lack of coordination between their educational institutions and sports administrators, the lack of academic support for student-athletes and the fact that the existing system in place failed to uphold students' "right to learn" or practically prepare student-athletes for life outside of sports.

The abuse of the "student-athlete" status by Choi Soon-sil to benefit her daughter Chung Yoo-ra and Ewha Womans University's involvement shed light on the KUSF. At that time, it became known that the KUSF issued a new rule for its member institutions regarding academic performance, known as the "C⁰ rule" (under Article 25 of the University Sports Regulations). It refers to the rule that athletes cannot participate in the upcoming semester if their GPA for the previous two semesters was below C⁰, which is a 2.0 GPA on a 4.3 or 4.5 scale depending on institution. The KUSF came under criticism for allegedly enacting the rule as a knee-jerk response to the Choi Soon-sil/Chung Yoo-ra controversy, to which the KUSF countered with a statement that the rule had actually been discussed and announced to member institutions from 2012 to 2015 before the controversy broke out and C⁰ was the agreed minimum grade.
