= U-League (basketball) =

Basketball at the U-League
- Organising body: Korea University Basketball Federation; Korea University Sports Federation
- Founded: 2010, as Korean University Basketball League; 2018, as U-League
- Country: South Korea
- Number of clubs: 12 (Division 1, men); 9 (women)

Basketball at the U-League (Korean: 대학농구 U-리그), known as Korean University Basketball League (Korean: 한국대학농구리그) before being merged into the U-League in 2018, is the main college basketball competition in South Korea. It is sanctioned by the Korea University Basketball Federation (KUBF; Korean: 한국대학농구연맹), which oversees college basketball in South Korea, and the Korea University Sports Federation (KUSF).

== Teams ==
The following universities and colleges are members of the Korea University Basketball Federation:

=== Men ===
Division 1

- Chosun University (Gwangju)
- Chung-Ang University (Seoul)
- Dankook University (Seoul)
- Dongguk University (Seoul)
- Hanyang University (Seoul)
- Konkuk University (Seoul)
- Korea University (Seoul)
- Kyung Hee University (Seoul)
- Myongji University (Seoul)
- Sangmyung University (Seoul)
- Sungkyunkwan University (Seoul)
- Yonsei University (Seoul)

Division 2

- Busan Arts College (Busan)
- Chodang University (Muan County, South Jeolla Province)
- Chosun College of Science and Technology (Gwangju)
- Korea Golf University (Hoengseong County, Gangwon Province)
- Mokpo National University (Mokpo)
- Sejong University (Seoul)
- Seoul National University (Seoul)
- Woosuk University (Wanju County, North Jeolla Province)
- University of Ulsan (Ulsan)

=== Women ===
- Dankook University (Seoul)
- Gwangju University (Gwangju)
- Pusan National University (Busan)
- University of Suwon (Suwon)
- University of Ulsan (Ulsan)
- Vision College of Jeonju (Jeonju)

== Competition ==
The teams compete in a league/play-offs format with teams designated "home" or "away", mirroring the professional KBL and WKBL. Players who are registered with a team are eligible to participate in the rookie draft if they decide to become professional basketball players.

For the men's competition, only KUBF Division 1 members participate in the KUSF U-League. The U-League is considered to be the elite competition and a stepping stone to the KBL as a majority of the players from Division 1 teams will declare for the KBL rookie draft. Teams from Division 2 member institutions participate in the KUSF Club Championship. Both Division 1 and Division 2 teams also participate in the older MBC Cup competition organized by the KUBF.

The women's teams participate in the KUSF U-League. They also compete in the MBC Cup, along with club teams (non U-League members).

== Results ==
=== Men ===
Year	Championship (winner)	Championship (runner-up)	Championship MVP	Regular season champion	Regular season MVP
2011	Kyung Hee University	Yonsei University	Park Rae-hoon (Kyung Hee University)	Kyung Hee University	Kim Min-goo (Kyung Hee University)
2012	Kyung Hee University	Chung-Ang University	Kim Jong-kyu (Kyung Hee)	Kyung Hee University	Kim Min-goo (Kyung Hee University)
2013	Korea University	Kyung Hee University	Lee Jong-hyun (Korea University)	Kyung Hee University	Kim Jong-kyu (Kyung Hee University)
2014	Korea University	Yonsei University	Lee Seoung-hyun (Korea University)	Korea University	Lee Seoung-hyun (Korea University)
2015	Korea University	Yonsei University	Kang Sang-jae (Korea University)	Korea University	Moon Seong-gon (Korea University)
2016	Yonsei University	Korea University	Cheon Ki-bum (Yonsei University)	Korea University	Lee Jong-hyun (Korea University)
2017	Yonsei University	Korea University	Heo Hoon (Yonsei University)	Korea University	Kim Nak-hyeon (Korea University)
2018	Yonsei University	Korea University	Lee Jung-hyun (Yonsei University)	Korea University	Jeon Hyun-woo (Korea University)
2019	Yonsei University	Sungkyunkwan University	Kim Kyung-won (Yonsei University)	Yonsei University	Kim Kyung-won (Yonsei University)

Due to the COVID-19 pandemic, the full season was not played between 2020 and the first half of 2022.

Year	Championship (winner)	Championship (runner-up)	Championship MVPs	Regular season champion
2020 (Note: Only two rounds were played. League positions were determined by combining points accumulated from both rounds.)	Yonsei University	Korea University	Park Ji-won (Yonsei University); Han Seung-hee (Yonsei University)	Yonsei University
2021 (Note: Only three rounds were played. League positions were determined by combining points accumulated from all three rounds.)	Yonsei University	Korea University; Dongguk University	Lee Jung-hyun (Yonsei University); Shin Seung-min (Yonsei University)	Yonsei University
2022	Korea University	Konkuk University; Kyung Hee University; Dankook University	Moon Jeong-hyeon (Korea University)	
2023	Korea University	Yonsei University	Park Mu-bin (Korea University)	

=== Women ===
Year	Championship (winner)	Championship (runner-up)	Regular season champion
2015	Yong In University	Gwangju University	Gwangju University
2016	Gwangju University	University of Suwon	Gwangju University
2017	Gwangju University	University of Suwon	Gwangju University
2018	University of Suwon	Gwangju University	University of Suwon
2019	Pusan National University	Dankook University	Pusan National University
2020	Pusan National University	Vision College of Jeonju	Pusan National University
2021 (Note: The season was split into two "rounds" and thus had two winning teams instead of an overall winner.)	Pusan National University; Pusan National University	Dankook University; Dankook University	Gwangju University; Dankook University

== History ==
The Basketball U-League was founded in 2010 (men's competition) and 2015 (women's competition) as part of the Korea University Sports Federation's effort to organize college sports into a more streamlined format similar to the National Collegiate Athletic Association in the United States. The U-League system also includes five other sports.

The Korea University Basketball Federation has existed since 1964 and college teams competed in the Korean Basketball Association-sanctioned National Basketball Festival (Korean: 농구대잔치). At that time, basketball was still an amateur sport and teams were all sponsored by corporate companies or universities. When the professional league (Korean Basketball League) was founded in 1997, the senior teams all became professional teams, leaving only the Korea Armed Forces Athletic Corps's Sangmu basketball team and college teams to compete in the tournament. With the founding of the U-League, a large number of college teams opt not to send their teams to the National Basketball Festival or only send their freshmen.
