= Kim Min-goo =

South Korean basketball player (born 1991)

Personal information
- Born: June 24, 1991 (age 35) Suwon, South Korea
- Listed height: 6 ft 2 in (1.88 m)
- Listed weight: 165 lb (75 kg)

Career information
- High school: Samil Commercial High School
- College: Kyung Hee University
- KBL draft: 2013: 1st round, 2nd overall pick
- Playing career: 2013–2021
- Position: Point guard / shooting guard
- Number: 9

Career history
- 2013–2019: Jeonju KCC Egis
- 2019-2020: Wonju DB Promy
- 2020-2021: Ulsan Hyundai Mobis Phoebus
Medals
Representing South Korea
Men's basketball
FIBA Asia Championship
Bronze medal – third place	2013 Manila	Team

- Korean name
- Hangul: 김민구
- Hanja: 金敏九
- RR: Gim Mingu
- MR: Kim Min'gu

Kim Min-goo (born June 24, 1991) is a South Korean former professional basketball player. He previously played for Jeonju KCC Egis, Wonju DB Promy and Ulsan Hyundai Mobis Phoebus and represented South Korea at the 2013 FIBA Asia Championship. At the 2013 FIBA Asia Championship in Manila, he was named to the tournament's All-Star Team.

== Early life ==
A graduate of Samil Commercial High School in Suwon, Kim was schoolmates with Lee Dae-sung and they led the team to success at the 2008 National High School Basketball Championship. During the final, Kim notably scored 14 points in the first quarter alone and then was sent-off later in the game for accumulated fouls.

== College career ==
Kim was admitted into Kyung Hee University. Together with his contemporaries Kim Jong-kyu and future KBL MVP Doo Kyung-min, the trio led Kyung Hee to back-to-back sweeps of the regular season title, championship and MBC Cup and breaking the dominance of the traditional "big three" of college basketball (Yonsei University, Korea University and Chung-Ang University). He was named U League regular season MVP twice.

Kim became the team's starting guard leading his team to the championship finals of the newly-established U-League. As a sophomore during the 2011 season Kim averaged 19.1 points, 5.9 assists and 8.4 rebounds, often cited as the best guard in the college league. He was named the Regular Season MVP and helped his team win the national championship. As a junior during the 2012 season Kim averaged 22.6 points, 5.8 assists and 6.1 rebounds. He was named the Regular Season MVP for the second year in a row and helped his team win its second national championship. That season, he set the record for the most assists in a U-League game, with 17; the record was only broken in April 2021.

== Professional career ==
=== Jeonju KCC Egis (2013–2019) ===
Kim was the second overall pick in the 2013 KBL rookie draft while his Kyung Hee teammates Kim Jong-kyu and Doo Kyung-min were first and third, marking a rare occasion when the first three picks of the rookie draft were all from the same university and not from one of the "big three" college basketball programs. Having been dubbed the "second Hur Jae" in college, Kim was drafted by Jeonju KCC Egis, then coached by Hur. He made his league debut on October 26 against Seoul Samsung Thunders, putting up 12 points and 6 assists. Despite being a rookie, he quickly established himself as a main player in his team and averaged 13.4 points, 5.1 rebounds and 4.6 assists.

On June 7, 2014, Kim was involved in a traffic accident when he ran a red light while driving under the influence of alcohol. This car accident caused serious injuries to his hip joint. However, it was revealed that he not only drove drunk and drowsy, but was also not wearing a seatbelt. while with the national team, and he was in rehabilitation for over a year. Due to his absence, Jeonju KCC Egis signed another guard Kim Ji-hoo during the 2014 rookie draft to fill Kim's void. By the time Kim was able to return, he was regarded as surplus and sent to the D-League reserve team. Kim Ji-hoo establishing himself in the team and the signing of veteran guard Lee Jung-hyun in 2017 further limited his appearances. At the end of the 2018-19 season, he became a free agent but the lack of interest from other teams forced him to renegotiate his contract for a lowered salary. He was then traded to Wonju DB Promy for Park Ji-hoon.

=== Wonju DB Promy (2019–2020) ===
Kim joined Wonju DB Promy for the 2019-20 season, along with his university teammate Kim Jong-kyu. With Doo Kyung-min's discharge from the military in January, the former Kyung Hee University teammates were reunited in the same professional team for the first time.

Kim was expected to be a bench player but was given more playing time as the main shooting guards Heo Ung and Kim Hyun-ho were both injured. When Heo returned from injury, Kim formed a partnership with him as Wonju DB Promy topped the league rankings. Unfortunately, the 2019-20 season ended prematurely due to the COVID-19 pandemic and the results were forfeited.

=== Ulsan Hyundai Mobis Phoebus (2020–2021) ===
In 2020 Kim signed a two-year contract with Ulsan Hyundai Mobis Phoebus, coached by Yoo Jae-hak whom he played under in the national team. At the end of the 2020-21 season, it was announced that he and the team mutually agreed to end his contract. While his physical condition was never the same after the 2014 accident, the announcement came as a surprise as he was still regarded as an important substitute player and expected to see out his contract. He revealed that his knee had "reached its limit", prompting him to consider retiring earlier than expected.

== National team career ==
In August 2011, Kim was selected for the South Korean collegiate national team to compete in the 2011 Summer Universiade. As a senior in 2013 Kim was selected for the South Korean national team to compete in the 2013 FIBA Asia Championship. During the competition Kim served as the backup shooting guard, manning the position when starter Cho Sung-Min was not in the game. However, Kim averaged 12.7 points, 2.7 assists and 4.1 rebounds in only 19.9 minutes per game, and topped the entire tournament with 25 three-point field goals made in nine games. Although Team Korea failed to win the championship. losing to the Philippines in the semifinal game, they clinched the slot for next year's FIBA World Cup defeating Chinese Taipei 75-57 in the third place game. In the semifinal game against the Philippines, Kim scored 27 points on 9-of-15 shooting overall and 5-of-11 from the three-point range. In the third-place game against Chinese Taipei, Kim led Team Korea with a game-high 21 points and shot 5-of-10 from the three-point range.

== Controversy ==
On June 7, 2014, Kim was injured in a car accident as a result of drunk driving. As his blood alcohol level was over the legal limit, his driving license was suspended. Additionally, the severity of his injuries meant that he was unable to participate in the Asian Games and World Cup and missed the entire 2014-15 season and much of the 2015-16 season. In September 2015, the KBL announced that since his playing career was still in limbo, he was given a warning instead of a suspension and ordered to complete 120 hours of community service. The news, coupled by Jeonju KCC Egis' lack of an official statement or apology, caused an uproar among sports fans who labeled his punishment as "light" compared to athletes from other sports who had committed the same offence, although conceding that his physical injuries was already a punishment itself. Nonetheless, Jeonju KCC Egis's management still faced criticism for failing to adequately address the issue.
