= Jeon Jun-beom =

South Korean basketball player

No. 17 – Jeonju KCC Egis
- Position: Forward
- League: Korean Basketball League

Personal information
- Born: August 27, 1991 (age 35) Seoul, South Korea
- Listed height: 6 ft 4 in (1.93 m)

Career information
- High school: Kyungbock High School
- College: Yonsei University
- KBL draft: 2013: 1st round, 9th overall pick
- Playing career: 2013–present

Career history
- 2013–2021: Ulsan Mobis Phoebus
- 2018–2020: → Sangmu (loan)
- 2021–present: Jeonju KCC Egis

Career highlights
- KBL Championship (2014, 2015); KBL regular season champion (2015)

- Jeon Jun-beom
- Hangul: 전준범
- RR: Jeon Junbeom
- MR: Chŏn Chunbŏm

Jeon Jun-beom (born August 27, 1991) is a South Korean professional basketball player. He plays for Jeonju KCC Egis in the Korean Basketball League and the South Korean national team.

== Career ==
=== College ===
Jeon played college basketball for Yonsei University.

=== Professional ===
In the 2013 KBL rookie draft, Jeon was drafted ninth overall in the first round by Ulsan Mobis Phoebus. He was mostly a substitute player as he was behind Lee Dae-sung and Song Chang-yong in the depth chart.

Jeon gained cult hero status among domestic basketball fans for a series of viral incidents which led to his manager Yoo Jae-hak coining the term "Jeon Jun-beom Day". On December 17, 2014, Ulsan Mobis Phoebus was up 89-88 in the game against Seoul SK Knights. In the dying seconds of the fourth quarter, Jeon committed a foul, prompting a visibly furious Yoo Jae-hak to swear out loud on camera. Fortunately, Seoul SK Knights' Aaron Haynes missed the free throw and Ulsan won the game. The next year on the exact same day, with Ulsan ahead by a point against Seoul Samsung Thunders, he conceded a foul during the last 2 seconds of the fourth quarter. However, Seoul Samsung Thunders' Jang Min-guk scored the free throw and the Thunders won the game. During the post-game interview, Yoo commented that Jeon's jersey number happened to be 17 and sarcastically declared that December 17 should be known as "Jeon Jun-beom Day". The incident went viral among fans and netizens and the club started to sell Jeon's jerseys at a 17% discount on December 17 every year. While Jeon's coaches and teammates have clarified that the incidents were one-off mistakes and did not comprehensively reflect Jeon's overall skills as a player, fans and sports writers have continued to extensively document Jeon's exploits whenever he has a game on December 17.

Jeon applied to serve his mandatory military service with the Sangmu basketball team but was rejected. He was accepted the second time and enlisted in June 2018. He was discharged in March 2020.

With his contract ending after the 2020-21 season, Jeon became a free agent. He signed with Jeonju KCC Egis as part of a two-player deal.

=== National team ===
He participated at the 2017 FIBA Asia Cup and the 2018 Asian Games. When Kim Sang-shik took over as the new national team coach, he participated in the qualifiers for the 2019 FIBA World Cup. However, he was ultimately cut from the final tournament squad.
