= Heo Ung =

South Korean basketball player

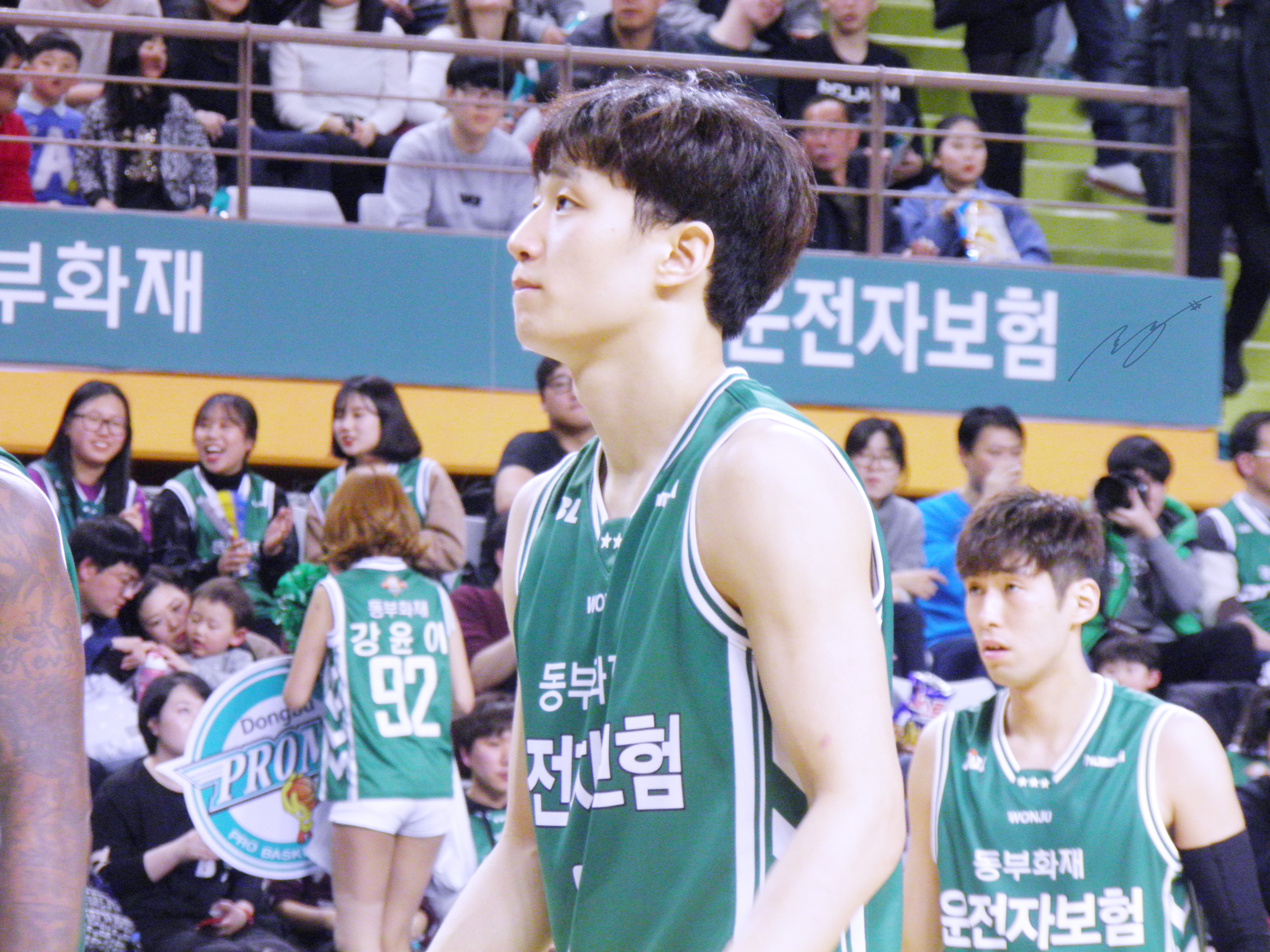

No. 3 – Busan KCC Egis
- Position: Shooting guard
- League: KBL

Personal information
- Born: August 5, 1993 (age 33) Gangnam District, Seoul, South Korea
- Listed height: 6 ft 1 in (1.85 m)
- Listed weight: 172 lb (78 kg)

Career information
- High school: Yongsan High School
- College: Yonsei University
- KBL draft: 2014: 1st round, 5th overall pick
- Playing career: 2014–present

Career history
- 2014–2022: Wonju DB Promy
- 2022–present: Busan KCC Egis
- 2017–2019: → Sangmu (loan)

Career highlights
- KBL champion (2024); KBL Playoffs MVP (2024); KBL Best 5 (2022); KBL Most Improved Player Award (2016)

- Heo Ung
- Hangul: 허웅
- Hanja: 許雄
- RR: Heo Ung
- MR: Hŏ Ung

Heo Ung (Korean: 허웅; born August 5, 1993) is a South Korean professional basketball player. He plays for Busan KCC Egis in the Korean Basketball League and the South Korean national team.

== Early life ==
Heo only began focusing on basketball in middle school, relatively late compared to many of his KBL peers, as his father, retired basketball player and coach Hur Jae, had been staunchly opposed to him and his younger brother becoming professional athletes. He spent a year and a half of his elementary school years in the United States when his father was sent for coaching training and worked as a coach at Pepperdine University. During this period, he and his brother were among the few Asians at their school and played basketball to escape being targets of racism and bullying. The family returned to South Korea when their father became the new Jeonju KCC Egis head coach and the brothers attended Yongsan Middle School and Yongsan High School, both of which are known for their basketball teams.

== College career ==
Heo turned down his father's alma mater Chung-Ang University to play for Yonsei University. His younger brother would join him at Yonsei two years later.

During his freshman year, Heo impressed at the Professional-Amateur Series, in which college basketball teams played a series of friendly games against KBL professional and reserve teams. He won the College Basketball Rookie of the Year award. His last year at Yonsei ended on a sour note when Yonsei lost to rival Korea University in the annual "friendship games" as well as all three major collegiate titles: being knocked out by Korea University in the MBC Cup quarter-finals, finishing runner-up to them in the U-League regular season standings and losing to them in the championship finals. However, he impressed in the MBC Cup quarter-final loss to Korea University by scoring 27 points, including eight 3-pointers, and caught the attention of KBL scouts. He dropped out during his junior year after deciding to turn professional.

== Professional career ==
=== DB Promy (2014–2022) ===
==== 2014–2019 ====
Heo declared for the 2014 KBL rookie draft and it was widely predicted that he would be picked by Jeonju KCC Egis, which was then coached by his father Hur Jae. Jeonju KCC Egis had been assigned the fourth pick but Hur Jae chose Kim Ji-hoo from Korea University instead to prevent his son's career from being overshadowed. Heo was instead picked by Wonju DB Promy at fifth. He made his debut in October against Goyang Orions, contributing 5 points, 3 assists and 2 interceptions. Initially the back-up to the backcourt pair of Park Byung-woo and Doo Kyung-min, Heo was gradually given more playing time due to Park's injury problems and poor form. With Park enlisting at the end of the season, Heo was expected to step in as the main shooting guard for the upcoming 2015–16 season. Despite being only in his second season as a professional, he topped the All-Star fan vote. By the end of the season, he had established himself in the team and won the Most Improved Player Award, having averaged 12.03 points and playing in all 54 league games.

In May 2017, Heo enlisted for mandatory military service and was assigned to the Sangmu team after completing basic training. He was discharged in January 2019 and immediately returned to DB Promy's roster for the last few rounds of the 2018–19 season. By then his younger brother turned professional and DB Promy's match-up with his brother's team Busan KT Sonicboom in February drew much attention as it was the first time they had played against one another in the KBL.

==== 2019–2022 ====
Heo was plagued by persistent back and ankle problems during the 2019–20 season but averaged a career-high of 13.7 points in 14 games and ranked second for 3-point shots among domestic-born players. With the signing of free agent Kim Jong-kyu, he formed an offensive triumvirate together with Kim and Doo as DB finished the season at the top of the league table; due to the COVID-19 pandemic, the playoffs were canceled and the season's results were forfeited. He underwent surgery on his ankle at the end of the season, which had been cut short due to the COVID-19 pandemic. After spending the off-season in rehabilitation, he returned in time for the 2020–21 season.

Several games into the 2020–21 season, Heo suffered a knee injury. Due to injury problems ravaging the team throughout the season, the players had little time to gel and Heo occasionally had to play despite not being in peak physical condition. DB finished the season at 9th place, second from the bottom of the league table.

The 2021–22 season began well for Heo as he put up 26 points and 5 rebounds against Suwon KT Sonicboom in the season opening game. With the departure of Doo, who was traded to Daegu KOGAS Pegasus, he was forced to fill Doo's void as the team's main three-pointer specialist. However, in October against Goyang Orion Orions, he failed to score ten three-point shots in a row, leading commentators to humorously draw parallels with his father setting the same unwanted personal record during the 2000–01 season. In December, Heo reached two personal career benchmarks: the most points scored in a single game and reaching 3,000 points. He scored 39 points in DB's narrow loss to Changwon LG Sakers on December 1. Two weeks later, against Daegu KOGAS Pegasus, he became the 97th player in KBL history to reach 3,000 career points. He became the first domestic player since the 2011–12 season to score more than 900 points in the regular season, a rare feat for a shooting guard in a league which is still largely dependent on foreign players (mainly forwards and centers) to score. DB failed to qualify for the playoffs but he was voted into the KBL Best 5 for the first time and was the player from the lowest-ranked team to be selected.

=== Busan KCC Egis (2022–present) ===
Heo became a free agent at the end of the 2021–22 season. On May 24, it was announced that he had signed a five-year contract with Busan KCC Egis.

On May 5, 2024, Ung won the KBL championship with the Egis and was named the KBL Playoffs MVP after averaging 18.8 points over the five finals games.

== National team career ==
Heo was selected for the youth national teams as a high school student and participated in the 2011 U-19 World Championship. He participated in the 2017 FIBA Asia Cup and the 2018 Asian Games. Early on, during his father's tenure as the national team coach, Heo's selection was constantly a source of criticism and accusations of favouritism, which came to a head after South Korea failed to defend their gold medal at the Asian Games. His and his younger brother's selections were particularly criticized by the press and other league team coaches. Both brothers were also excluded from the squad list for the next several games after the Asian Games. He was recalled for the qualifiers for the 2019 FIBA Basketball World Cup and named in the World Cup preliminary squad but did not make the final 12-man squad.

In 2022, Heo was recalled to the national team for the first time in three years. Following his good form during the 2021–22 season, he was named in the squad to face the Philippines for a series of pre-2022 FIBA Asia Cup friendly games and was the first-option shooting guard. He made the final 12-man squad for the Asia Cup together with his younger brother, marking the first time since the 2018 Asian Games the brothers had been in the same squad for a major international tournament.

== Personal life ==
Heo is the older son of retired South Korean basketball player and former national team coach Hur Jae. His younger brother Heo Hoon also played for Yonsei University and currently plays for Suwon KT Sonicboom.

Heo Ung and Heo Hoon launched a jointly-run YouTube channel called Ko Sambuja (코삼부자), documenting their lives as professional athletes. Ko (코) is the Korean word for nose, a tongue in cheek reference to the brothers and their father having large noses, and sambuja (삼부자) means "father and son trio". In July 2021 they received the Silver Creator Award button for surpassing 100,000 subscribers.

Since June 2022, Heo has been represented by ESteem Entertainment.

== Filmography ==
=== Television shows ===
Year	Title	Role	Notes	Ref.
2021	Boss in the Mirror	Special MC	Ep. 109–111 (with Hur Jae)	
2021	Family Register Mate	Special Cast	Test broadcast	
2022	Impossible Time	Cast Member		
2022	Sports Golden Bell	Contestant	Chuseok Special	

=== Web series ===
Year	Title	Role	Notes	Ref.
2022	Frankly In-house Dating	Ji Hoon-ji	Promotional Video (PV)	
