= Ham Ji-hoon =

South Korean basketball player

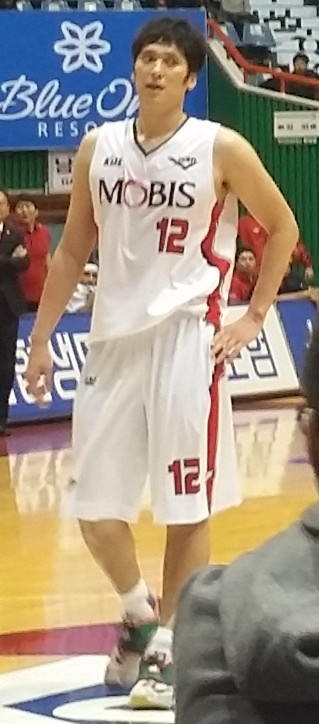

No. 12 – Ulsan Hyundai Mobis Phoebus
- Position: Forward
- League: Korean Basketball League

Personal information
- Born: December 11, 1984 (age 41) South Korea
- Listed height: 197.4 cm (6 ft 6 in)
- Listed weight: 103 kg (227 lb)

Career information
- High school: Kyungbock High School
- College: Chung-Ang University
- KBL draft: 2007: 1st round, 10th overall pick
- Playing career: 2007–present

Career history
- 2007–present: Ulsan Hyundai Mobis Phoebus
- 2010–2012: → Sangmu (military service)

Career highlights
- 5× KBL Championship (2010, 2013, 2014, 2015, 2019); 4× KBL regular season champion (2009, 2010. 2015, 2019); KBL Most Valuable Player Award (2010); KBL Playoffs MVP (2010); 3× KBL Best 5 (2010, 2016, 2019)

- Korean name
- Hangul: 함지훈
- Hanja: 咸志勳
- RR: Ham Jihun
- MR: Ham Chihun

Ham Ji-hoon (born December 11, 1984) is a South Korean professional basketball player. He plays for Ulsan Hyundai Mobis Phoebus in the Korean Basketball League and is the club's captain and longest-serving player after Yang Dong-geun.

== Early life and college career ==
Ham attended Kyungbock High School and played as a forward before being converted into a center at Chung-Ang University. Although his height, at just under 200 cm, is not considered tall for a center even by KBL standards, he stood out for his physicality. Ham was part of a new "golden generation" of Chung-Ang University players that included MVP winners Park Sang-oh and Yoon Ho-young, junior Kang Byung-hyun and freshman Oh Se-keun. The team broke Yonsei University's stranglehold on the MBC Cup and kick-started what would become a 52-game undefeated record and another four consecutive MBC Cups. They also won the 2007 National Basketball Festival (농구대잔치) competition, the main collegiate competition of that time.

== Professional career ==
Having been overshadowed by his Chung-Ang teammates, Ham mostly flew under the radar and it was reflected in his draft ranking. He was drafted tenth overall at the 2007 rookie draft by Ulsan Mobis Phoebus. Under Yoo Jae-hak, he developed a reputation as a "blue worker", a Konglish corruption of the term blue-collar worker and a colloquialism in domestic basketball used to describe an unflashy yet essential player often tasked with defending the post or the more physical aspects of the team strategy. By his second season, he had played in all five positions.

Ham enlisted for mandatory military service in April 2010 and was assigned the Korea Armed Forces Athletic Corps's Sangmu team. He was discharged in February 2012.

After Yang Dong-geun's retirement, Ham became the team captain and their longest-serving player. He reached two career benchmarks within days of each other during the 2021–21 season: scoring 7,000 points and recording 2,400 assists.

== Personal life ==
Ham married his girlfriend of six years in April 2012. They have two sons.
