= Kim Jong-kyu =

South Korean basketball player (born 1991)

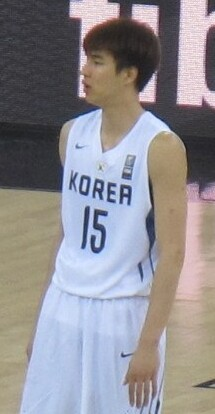
- Kim at the 2014 FIBA World Cup

No. 15 – Anyang Jung Kwan Jang Red Boosters
- Position: Center
- League: KBL

Personal information
- Born: July 3, 1991 (age 35) Seongnam, South Korea
- Listed height: 6 ft 9 in (2.06 m)
- Listed weight: 212 lb (96 kg)

Career information
- High school: Naksaeng High School
- College: Kyung Hee University
- KBL draft: 2013: 1st round, 1st overall pick
- Playing career: 2013–present

Career history
- 2013–2019: Changwon LG Sakers
- 2019–2025: Wonju DB Promy
- 2025–present: Anyang Jung Kwan Jang Red Boosters

Career highlights
- KBL Rookie of the Year Award (2014); KBL Best 5 (2020)

- Kim Jong-kyu
- Hangul: 김종규
- Hanja: 金鐘奎
- RR: Gim Jonggyu
- MR: Kim Chonggyu

Kim Jong-kyu (Korean: 김종규; born July 3, 1991) is a South Korean professional basketball player who plays for Anyang Jung Kwan Jang Red Boosters of the Korean Basketball League and the South Korea national team.

== Early life ==
Kim was not initially interested in basketball until his teacher noticed that he was the tallest in his class and suggested that he take up the sport. He attended Naksaeng High School in Seongnam where he stood out for his height and athleticism.

== College career ==
Kim played college basketball at Kyung Hee University, where he was teammates with Kim Min-goo and Doo Kyung-min. The trio led Kyung Hee to back-to-back sweeps of the U-League regular season title, championship and MBC Cup in 2011 and 2012 and breaking the dominance of the traditional "big three" of college basketball (Yonsei University, Korea University and Chung-Ang University). By the time he finished his senior year, he had double-double averages in points and rebounds, averaging 17.3 points and 11.2 rebounds in four seasons.

== Professional career ==
=== Changwon LG Sakers (2013–2019) ===
Kim was the first overall pick of the 2013 KBL rookie draft and was drafted by Changwon LG Sakers. Kim Min-goo was second and Doo Kyung-min was third, marking a rare occasion when the first three picks of the rookie draft were all from the same university and not from one of the "big three" college basketball programs. He only made his KBL debut in November due to commitments with the national team. His rookie season did not begin smoothly as he drew criticism for missing easy shots but gradually found his footing and became known as a dunk shot specialist. He ended the season with 10.7 points and 5.9 rebounds and was voted KBL Rookie of the Year.

At the end of the 2018-19 season, Kim chose not to renew his contract with Changwon LG Sakers and became a free agent. He joined Wonju DB Promy, becoming the league's highest-paid domestic player.

=== Wonju DB Promy (2019–2025) ===
Kim was a crucial player in DB's dominance in the 2019-20 season, forming a triumvirate with Heo Ung and Doo Kyung-min, who was discharged from military service in January. Kim Min-goo signed with DB that season in a player trade, briefly reuniting him with his former Kyung Hee University teammates. Although they ended the season at the top of the league table, the result was forfeited due to COVID-19 restrictions and the cancelation of the last few rounds. Despite the abbreviated season, he led the league in rebounds among domestic-born players. He was named into the KBL Best 5 and nominated for the Most Valuable Player award but narrowly lost to Busan KT Sonicboom guard Heo Hoon.

Two games into the 2020-21 season, DB went on an eleven-game losing streak due to a series of injury problems ravaging key players and experienced veterans. Kim was diagnosed with chronic plantar fasciitis and was limited to 20 minutes per game to manage the pain. DB finished second last in the league.

After the KBL announced its salary cap for the 2021–22 season, Kim negotiated a pay cut and is no longer the league's highest-domestic player, although he is still DB's highest paid player. In January, he scored 25 points, including a career-high six three-pointers, in the loss against Seoul SK Knights.

=== Anyang Jung Kwan Jang Red Boosters (2025–) ===
On January 23, 2025, Kim was traded to Anyang Jung Kwan Jang Red Boosters.

== National team career ==
Kim participated in the 2014 FIBA Basketball World Cup. Later that year, he was called up for the 2014 Asian Games hosted at home. The team won the gold medal, the first since 2002, and Kim and other teammates who had yet to serve their mandatory military service were granted exemptions.
