= 2013 Korean Basketball League draft =

2013 KBL draft

General information
- Sport: Basketball
- Date: September 30, 2013
- Location: Jamsil Students' Gymnasium

Overview
- League: KBL
- First selection: Kim Jong-kyu (Changwon LG Sakers)

The 2013 Korean Basketball League rookie draft (Korean: 2013 KBL 국내신인선수 드래프트) was held on September 30, 2013, at the Jamsil Students' Gymnasium in Seoul, South Korea. Out of the 39 players who participated in the draft, 22 were selected. Changwon LG Sakers won the lottery for the first overall pick.

== Draft selections ==
This table only shows the first twenty picks.

G	Guard
F	Forward
C	Center

Denotes players who have won a KBL-sanctioned award at its annual awards ceremony (Note: One or more of the following awards: Regular season MVP; Playoffs MVP; Rookie of the Year; Best 5; Defensive Player of the Year; Defensive Best 5; Sixth Man Award; Most Improved Player; Fair Play Award)

Round	Pick	Player	Position	Team	School/club team
1	1	Kim Jong-kyu	C	Changwon LG Sakers	Kyung Hee University (senior)
1	2	Kim Min-goo	G	Jeonju KCC Egis	Kyung Hee University (senior)
1	3	Doo Kyung-min	G	Wonju Dongbu Promy	Kyung Hee University (senior)
1	4	Park Jae-hyun	G	Seoul Samsung Thunders	Korea University (senior)
1	5	Lee Jae-do	G	Busan KT Sonicboom	Hanyang University (senior)
1	6	Han Ho-bin	G	Goyang Orions	Konkuk University (senior)
1	7	Jeon Seong-hyun	F	Anyang KGC	Chung-Ang University (senior)
1	8	Lim Jun-su	G	Incheon Electro Land Elephants	Sungkyunkwan University
1	9	Jeon Jun-beom	F	Ulsan Mobis Phoebus	Yonsei University (senior)
1	10	Kim Young-hyun	G	Ulsan Mobis Phoebus	Kyung Hee University
2	11	Lee Dae-sung	G	Ulsan Mobis Phoebus	(United States) BYU–Hawaii (senior)
2	12	Lee Jung-jae	C	Incheon Electro Land Elephants	Korea University (senior)
2	13	Lee Dae-hyuk	C	Anyang KGC	Konkuk University
2	14	Lim Seung-pil	C	Goyang Orions	Dongguk University
2	15	Oh Chang-hwan	G	Busan KT Sonicboom	Hanyang University
2	16	Jo Han-soo	C	Seoul Samsung Thunders	Sungkyunkwan University
2	17	Kim Chang-mo	F	Wonju Dongbu Promy	Yonsei University (senior)
2	18	Yeom Seung-min	G	Jeonju KCC Egis	Korea University (senior)
2	19	Lee Gwan-gi	F	Changwon LG Sakers	Korea University
2	20	Shin Jae-ho	G	Seoul SK Knights	Dankook University

== Players ==
The draft has been dubbed the "Kyung Hee draft" due to the fact that the first three overall picks were from Kyung Hee University, breaking the monopoly of the traditional college basketball "big 3" (Yonsei University, Korea University and Chung-Ang University). Such was the anticipation over the three Kyung Hee University players that disgruntled Changwon LG Sakers fans accused head coach Kim Jin of "giving up on basketball" (intentionally achieving poor results) to finish in a lower position of the 2011–12 league table so that they can qualify for the draft lottery to get an earlier pick, accusations which Kim has denied.

Lee Dae-sung had played college basketball in the NCAA Division II before returning to South Korea. Since he had last played overseas, he did not qualify to be automatically included in the KBL's list of rookies for the draft and joined the draft via the try-out open to amateur players not from a domestic college program, impressing enough to earn a nomination.

== See also ==
- Korean Basketball League draft
