= Doo Kyung-min =

South Korean basketball player

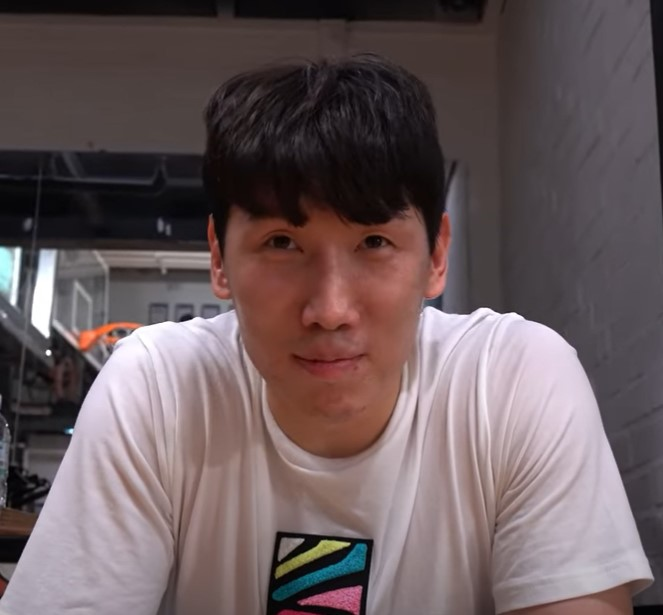
- Doo in 2022

No. 30 – Changwon LG Sakers
- Position: Guard
- League: KBL

Personal information
- Born: 22 September 1991 (age 35) Seoul, South Korea
- Listed height: 184 cm (6 ft 0 in)
- Listed weight: 79 kg (174 lb)

Career information
- High school: Yangchung High School
- College: Kyung Hee University
- KBL draft: 2013: 1st round, 3rd overall pick
- Playing career: 2013–present

Career history
- 2013-2021: Wonju DB Promy
- 2018-2020: → Sangmu (loan)
- 2021-2022: Daegu KOGAS Pegasus
- 2022-2024: Wonju DB Promy
- 2024-present: Changwon LG Sakers

Career highlights
- KBL regular season champion (2018); KBL Most Valuable Player (2018); KBL Best 5 (2018)

- Doo Kyung-min
- Hangul: 두경민
- Hanja: 杜京民
- RR: Du Gyeongmin
- MR: Tu Kyŏngmin

Doo Kyung-min (born 22 September 1991) is a South Korean professional basketball player. He plays for Changwon LG Sakers in the Korean Basketball League and for the South Korean national team.

== Early years ==
Doo enjoyed playing basketball as a child. His father is a former basketball coach, who was initially opposed to him becoming a professional player. Doo did not attend a high school with a notable basketball program like many of his KBL peers did. Instead he attended the high school nearest to his home, Yangchung High school, which happened to have a basketball team. However, he was not a highly rated prospect.

== College career ==
Doo was admitted to Kyung Hee University, where his contemporaries included Kim Jong-kyu and Kim Min-goo. He spent his freshman year mostly as a substitute player. At that time, Kyung Hee was not known as a major force in college basketball, but the trio eventually led the team to a back-to-back sweep of the regular season title, the championship and the MBC Cup.

Doo gained the reputation as a 'behind the scenes' player who never drew as much attention as his more illustrious and skilled teammates but stepped up when needed. During the 2012 championship finals, he gained significant attention after putting up a combined 54 points (in both legs). He was named most valuable player of the 2012 MBC Cup tournament. In 2013, he played a key role in Kyung Hee reaching the final of the tournament for a fourth consecutive year, by orchestrating a comeback from a 20-point deficit to defeat Hanyang University in the semifinals. During his senior year, the Kyung Hee team were unable to overcome Korea University, losing to them in both the U-League championship and the MBC Cup final.

== Professional career ==
=== Wonju DB Promy (2013–2021) ===
Doo was drafted third overall in the 2013 KBL rookie draft by Wonju Dongbu Promy. The first two picks were his Kyung Hee teammates Kim Jong-kyu and Kim Min-goo, marking a rare occasion in which the first three picks of a draft came from the same university and not from a traditional "big 3" college basketball program (Yonsei, Korea and Chung-Ang).

The 2017-18 season was Doo's breakthrough season as he averaged 16.45 points and 3.8 assists. DB topped the league table and reached the play-off finals but lost to Seoul SK Knights. Doo won the KBL Most Valuable Player Award and was voted into the Best 5. Despite his stellar performances during the season, he was controversially cut from the final squads for both the William Jones Cup and 2018 Asian Games.

Doo enlisted for mandatory military service in May 2018 and was assigned to the Sangmu team after completing basic training. He was discharged in January 2020. In the two games immediately after his return, he made an immediate impact and scored 93.5 points. He formed a partnership with shooting guard Heo Ung and his college teammate Kim Jong-kyu, who had joined DB that season. However, the season ended prematurely and play-offs were canceled due to the COVID-19 pandemic; the results for the 2019–20 season were forfeited, although DB finished at the top of the league table.

The 2020–21 season was forgettable as injuries ravaged key players. DB ended the season at 9th place, second last in the league table. In the January game against Goyang Orions, Doo scored a buzzer beater with 1 second left on the clock to win the game 92–90; it was voted Play of the Season at the annual KBL awards ceremony. He was traded to Daegu KOGAS Pegasus, formerly Incheon Electroland Elephants, for Kang Sang-jae and Park Chan-hee.

=== Daegu KOGAS Pegasus (2021–2023) ===
Doo did not play much during the first several games as he was still recovering from an injury and not in peak condition. He struck a back court partnership with Kim Nak-hyun, his experience complementing Kim's pace.

=== National team ===
Doo has mostly been a reserve guard for the national team due to the presence of veterans Park Chan-hee and Kim Sun-hyung and later the emergence of Choi Jun-yong, Heo Hoon and Kim Nak-hyun. He participated in the qualifiers for the 2017 FIBA Asia Cup, 2018 Asian Games and the 2019 FIBA World Cup but never made the final 12-man squad for any of the tournaments.

== Personal life ==
Doo married former actress Im Soo-hyun in February 2018. Their son was born in January 2020.
