= 2014 Korean Basketball League draft =

2014 KBL draft

General information
- Sport: Basketball
- Date: September 17, 2014
- Location: Jamsil Students' Gymnasium
- Network: MBC Sports+

Overview
- League: KBL
- First selection: Lee Seoung-hyun (Goyang Orions)

The 2014 Korean Basketball League rookie draft (Korean: 2014 KBL 국내신인선수 드래프트) was held on September 17, 2014, at the Jamsil Students' Gymnasium in Seoul, South Korea. Out of the 39 participants, 21 players were drafted. Goyang Orions won the lottery for first overall pick and also obtained the seventh overall pick via a trade with Busan KT Sonicboom.

== Draft selections ==
This table only shows the first twenty picks.

G	Guard
F	Forward
C	Center

Denotes players who have won a KBL-sanctioned award at its annual awards ceremony (Note: One or more of the following awards: Regular season MVP; Playoffs MVP; Rookie of the Year; Best 5; Defensive Player of the Year; Defensive Best 5; Sixth Man Award; Most Improved Player; Fair Play Award)

Round	Pick	Player	Position	Team	School/club team
1	1	Lee Seoung-hyun	F	Goyang Orions	Korea University (senior)
1	2	Kim Jun-il	C	Seoul Samsung Thunders	Yonsei University (senior)
1	3	Jeong Hyo-geun	F	Incheon Electro Land Elephants	Hanyang University (junior)
1	4	Kim Ji-hoo	G	Jeonju KCC Egis	Korea University (senior)
1	5	Heo Ung	G	Wonju Dongbu Promy	Yonsei University (junior)
1	6	Kim Ki-yoon	G	Anyang KGC	Yonsei University (senior)
1	7	Lee Ho-hyun	G	Goyang Orions	Chung-Ang University (senior)
1	8	Lee Hyun-suk	G	Seoul SK Knights	Sangmyung University (senior)
1	9	Choi Seung-wook	G	Changwon LG Sakers	Yonsei University (junior)
1	10	Bae Su-yong	F	Ulsan Mobis Phoebus	Kyung Hee University (senior)
2	11	Kim Su-chan	G	Ulsan Mobis Phoebus	Myongji University (senior)
2	12	Joo Ji-hoon	C	Changwon LG Sakers	Yonsei University (senior)
2	13	Choi Won-hyuk	G	Seoul SK Knights	Hanyang University (senior)
2	14	Park Chul-ho	C	Busan KT Sonicboom	Chung-Ang University (senior)
2	15	Seok Jong-tae	F	Anyang KGC	Dongguk University
2	16	Kim Young-hoon	F	Wonju Dongbu Promy	Dongguk University (senior)
2	17	Han Seung-won	G	Jeonju KCC Egis	Kyung Hee University
2	18	Lee Jin-wook	F	Incheon Electro Land Elephants	Sangmyung University
2	19	Bae Kang-ryul	F	Seoul Samsung Thunders	Myongji University (senior)
2	20	Busan KT Sonicboom forfeited			

== Players ==
Lee Seoung-hyun is the first Korea University player since Lee Kyu-sup to be picked first overall. Lee Kyu-sup, now a coach at Seoul Samsung Thunders, had been the first overall pick of the 2000 draft.

The draft received considerable attention as Yonsei University shooting guard Heo Ung, son of then-Jeonju KCC Egis head coach Hur Jae, was among the draft participants. He was one of the few juniors as "early entry" was still considered uncommon at that time. Hur Jae was expected to pick his son but chose Korea University senior Kim Ji-hoo instead and Heo Ung was picked by Hur's former team Wonju Dongbu Promy.

== See also ==
- Korean Basketball League draft
