= Kim Nak-hyeon =

South Korean basketball player (born 1995)

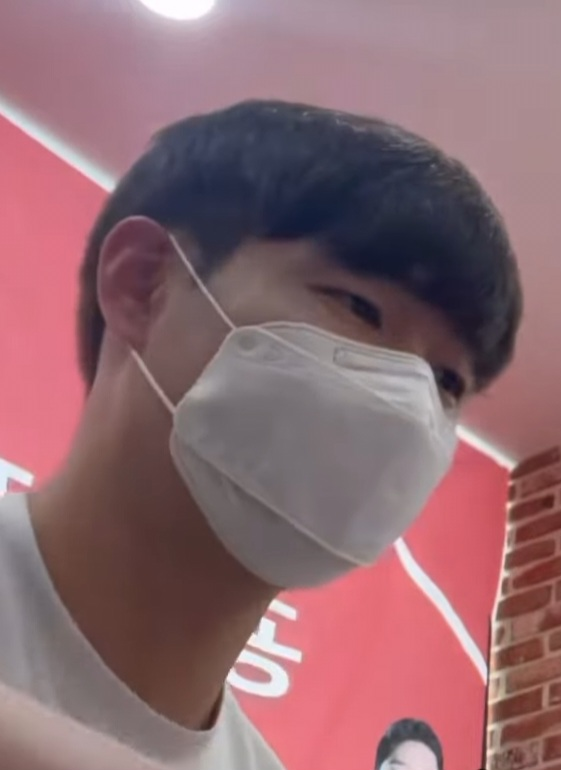

No. 4 – Seoul SK Knights
- Position: Guard
- League: KBL

Personal information
- Born: 12 March 1995 (age 31) Yeosu, South Korea
- Listed height: 183.7 cm (6 ft 0 in)
- Listed weight: 92 kg (203 lb)

Career information
- College: Korea University
- KBL draft: 2017: 1st round, 6th overall pick
- Playing career: 2017–present

Career history
- 2017–2025: Incheon Electroland Elephants / Daegu KOGAS Pegasus
- 2022–2023: → Sangmu (loan)
- 2025–present: Seoul SK Knights

Career highlights
- KBL Sixth Man Award (2019); KBL Most Improved Player Award (2020)

- Kim Nak-hyeon
- Hangul: 김낙현
- Hanja: 金諾賢
- RR: Gim Nakhyeon
- MR: Kim Nakhyŏn

Kim Nak-hyeon (born March 12, 1995) is a South Korean professional basketball player. He plays for Seoul SK Knights in the Korean Basketball League and the South Korean national team.

== Early life ==
A native of Yeosu, Kim started playing basketball in elementary school. He began attracting the attention of scouts throughout his elementary and middle school years for leading his teams to win over more notable schools; at that time, the best-known basketball schools were mostly concentrated in the Seoul metropolitan area and it was rare for teams from small provincial schools to beat them. He chose not to follow many of his peers and move to another more notable basketball program located in a bigger city. Instead, he remained in his hometown and played for Hwayang High School.

== College career ==
Kim was scouted by Korea University, which was considered the most formidable college team at that time. His seniors at that time included Moon Seong-gon, Kang Sang-jae and Lee Jong-hyun. He was mostly the sixth man for his freshman and sophomore seasons.

As a senior, Kim was named team captain. The Tigers were mostly battling traditional athletic rivals Yonsei University for dominance in the U-League and MBC Cup competitions throughout the season. He scored 17 points and tallied 6 assists in the MBC Cup final against incumbent winners Yonsei and was named tournament MVP. His senior year ended on a bittersweet note as Korea University lost the U-League Championship title to Yonsei but won the regular season title as well as the MBC Cup.

== Professional career ==
Kim was expected to be the second guard drafted in the 2017 rookie draft after his stellar performances in college. However, freshman point guard Yoo Hyun-jun was drafted by Jeonju KCC Egis at third in a surprise move. As a result, Kim was pushed to sixth and was drafted by Incheon Electroland Elephants. As was the case with fellow guards Heo Hoon and Yoo Hyun-jun, he was also considered short for a guard even by KBL standards. Head coach Yoo Do-hoon opted to send him to the D-League team instead due to the presence of Park Chan-hee and back-up Park Sung-jin. Kim averaged 22.0 points in four games, impressing Yoo enough to be brought back to the main team for the rest of the season.

For his first two seasons, Kim was mostly the second option point guard and the sixth man. He won the Sixth Man Award for the 2018–19 season. By the following season, he was widely-viewed to be the Elephants' future star as the team was shifting towards a more fast-paced offense, as was the trend in the league, and Kim was most effective when playing as a scoring-oriented combo guard. He averaged 12.2 points in 40 games during the 2019–20 season, which had ended prematurely due to the COVID-19 pandemic; it was the first time he had averaged points in the double digits.

The Elephants were sold to a new owner and moved to Daegu to become Daegu KOGAS Pegasus ahead of the 2021–22 season. With veteran players and new signings struggling with injuries or underperforming, Kim stepped up as the team's first option guard and was a major contributor to them beating Changwon LG Sakers in a tight battle for sixth place, the final spot for the playoffs. In January, KOGAS had been in 8th place but won eight of their last eleven games. He was named Round MVP of the sixth round, having posted a field goal percentage of 47.8% and averaged 14.6 points and 7.4 assists in the 9 games.

On May 16, 2022, Kim enlisted for mandatory military service and was assigned to the Korea Armed Forces Athletic Corps' Sangmu basketball team. He was discharged on November 15, 2023.

Kim struggled with knee problems and it affected his performance during the 2023-24 season. Daegu failed to qualify for the playoffs, finishing in 7th place. His poor form and injury struggles continued into the first half of the 2024-25 season and Jeong Seong-woo and SJ Belangel became the preferred the backcourt pairing. During the playoffs, he was injured in Game 2 of the quarterfinals against Suwon KT Sonicboom and ruled out for the rest of the series. His injury compounded Daegu's injury woes to key players, including their foreign players, and KT eventually won the series 3-2.

Kim became a free agent and was widely expected to renew his contract as he was a fan favorite and the second longest-serving player on the team following one-club man Lim Jun-su's retirement. In May, it was announced that he had signed a five-year contract with Seoul SK Knights to replace Kim Sun-hyung, who had signed with KT.

== National team career ==
Kim was called up to the youth teams for the 2011 U-16 Asia Championship and the 2012 U-17 World Championship.

Kim was named in the squad list for the 2018 Asian Games and sent to the 3x3 team, clinching a silver medal. During the final against China, South Korea were initially ahead but Kim had fouled Huang Wenwei with 4.4 seconds left and Huang scored both free throws.
