= 2007 Korean Basketball League draft =

2007 KBL draft

General information
- Sport: Basketball
- Date: February 1, 2007
- Location: Seoul Education and Cultural Center

Overview
- League: KBL
- First selection: Kim Tae-sul (Seoul SK Knights)

The 2007 Korean Basketball League rookie draft (Korean: 2007 KBL 국내신인선수 드래프트) was held on February 1, 2007, at the Education and Cultural Center in Yangjae-dong, Seoul, South Korea. Out of the 33 participants, 25 players were drafted.

== Draft selections ==
This table only shows the first twenty picks.

G	Guard
F	Forward
C	Center

Denotes players who have won a KBL-sanctioned award at its annual awards ceremony (Note: One or more of the following awards: Regular season MVP; Playoffs MVP; Rookie of the Year; Best 5; Defensive Player of the Year; Defensive Best 5; Sixth Man Award; Most Improved Player; Fair Play Award)

Round	Pick	Player	Position	Team	School/club team
1	1	Kim Tae-sul	G	Seoul SK Knights	Yonsei University (senior)
1	2	Lee Dong-jun	F	Incheon Electroland Black Slammer (Note: Traded to Daegu Orions before his KBL debut)	Yonsei University
1	3	Yang Hee-jong	F	Anyang KT&G Kites	Yonsei University (senior)
1	4	Jung Young-sam	G	Incheon Electroland Black Slammer	Konkuk University (senior)
1	5	Park Sang-oh	F	Busan KTF Magic Wings	Chung-Ang University
1	6	Shin Myung-ho	G	Jeonju KCC Egis	Kyung Hee University (senior)
1	7	Lee Kwang-jae	G	Wonju Dongbu Promy	Yonsei University (senior)
1	8	Kim Young-hwan	F	Daegu Orions (Note: Traded to Incheon Electroland Black Slammer, who then traded him to Busan KTF Magic Wings prior to his KBL debut)	Korea University (senior)
1	9	Woo Seung-yeon	F	Seoul Samsung Thunders	Kyung Hee University (senior)
1	10	Ham Ji-hoon	F	Ulsan Mobis Phoebus	Chung-Ang University (senior)
2	11	Park Goo-young	G	Ulsan Mobis Phoebus	Dankook University (senior)
2	12	Shin Je-rok (Note: Younger brother of actor Shin Sung-rok)	G	Seoul Samsung Thunders (Note: Shin Je-rok was picked by Seoul Samsung Thunders while Anyang KT&G Kites picked Kim Dong-woo. The players were swapped prior to their KBL debuts.)	Korea University (senior)
2	13	Kim Young-soo	G	Daegu Orions	Myongji University (senior)
2	14	Kim Bong-su	C	Wonju Dongbu Promy	Myongji University (senior)
2	15	Yoo Byung-jae	F	Jeonju KCC Egis	Dongguk University (senior)
2	16	Heo Hyo-jin	F	Busan KTF Magic Wings	Chung-Ang University (senior)
2	17	Song Chang-moo	C	Changwon LG Sakers	Myongji University (senior)
2	18	Kim Dong-woo	G	Anyang KT&G Kites	Hanyang University
2	19	Park Se-won	F	Incheon Electroland Black Slammer	Dongguk University
2	20	Kim Jae-hwan	C	Seoul SK Knights	Yonsei University

== Players ==
Korean-language basketball-centered magazine Rookie and newspaper Sports Dong-a have both retrospectively dubbed the 2007 draft as the "Golden Draft". Players from this draft include two winners of the KBL Most Valuable Player Award, members of the team which won gold at the 2014 Asian Games and several "one-club men" (active or retired players who spent their entire playing careers with the same team). Compared to past and present draft classes, as of the 2020–21 season, more players from this draft have continued to play regularly in their respective teams and maintained their professional careers into their mid-thirties. The 2021–22 playoffs featured Yang Hee-jong, Jung Young-sam and Ham Ji-hoon, all of whom were still with their original teams.

Ham won the KBL Most Valuable Player Award in 2010. As the last pick of the first round (10th overall), he is the lowest-ranked draft pick to have won the award.

Two players from the draft were much older than the others: Park Sang-oh and Lee Dong-jun. Park previously played for Chung-Ang University's basketball team but left the sport and then completed his mandatory military service before returning to basketball. Lee became a South Korean citizen and thus qualified for the rookie draft (despite having professional experience in Europe) instead of the ethnic draft.

== See also ==
- Korean Basketball League draft
