= 2017 Korean Basketball League draft =

2017 KBL draft

General information
- Sport: Basketball
- Date: October 30, 2017
- Location: Jamsil Students' Gymnasium
- Network: MBC Sports+

Overview
- League: KBL
- First selection: Heo Hoon (Busan KT Sonicboom)

The 2017 Korean Basketball League rookie draft (Korean: 2017 KBL 국내신인선수 드래프트) was held on October 30, 2017, at the Jamsil Students' Gymnasium in Seoul, South Korea. Out of the 44 participants, 27 players were drafted.

In September 2017, the KBL announced its confirmed list of 44 participants for the upcoming draft. The order of selection was chosen through two lotteries and announced on October 23. Busan KT Sonicboom won the right to the first overall pick and also obtained the second pick via a player trade with Changwon LG Sakers.

== Draft selections ==
This table only shows the first twenty picks.

G	Guard
F	Forward
C	Center

Denotes players who have won a KBL-sanctioned award at its annual awards ceremony (Note: One or more of the following awards: Regular season MVP; Playoffs MVP; Rookie of the Year; Best 5; Defensive Player of the Year; Defensive Best 5; Sixth Man Award; Most Improved Player; Fair Play Award)

Round	Pick	Player	Position	Team	School/club team
1	1	Heo Hoon	G	Busan KT Sonicboom	Yonsei University (senior)
1	2	Yang Hong-seok	F	Busan KT Sonicboom	Chung-Ang University (freshman)
1	3	Yoo Hyun-jun	G	Jeonju KCC Egis	Hanyang University (freshman)
1	4	An Young-jun	F	Seoul SK Knights	Yonsei University (senior)
1	5	Kim Gook-chan	F	Jeonju KCC Egis	Chung-Ang University (senior)
1	6	Kim Nak-hyeon	G	Incheon Electro Land Elephants	Korea University (senior)
1	7	Lee Woo-jung	G	Wonju DB Promy	Chung-Ang University (senior)
1	8	Kim Jin-yong	C	Ulsan Hyundai Mobis Phoebus	Yonsei University (senior)
1	9	Ha Do-hyun	F	Goyang Orion Orions	Dankook University (senior)
1	10	Jeon Tae-young	G	Anyang KGC	Dankook University (senior)
2	11	Jung Kang-ho	F	Anyang KGC	Sangmyung University (senior)
2	12	Lee Jin-wook	G	Goyang Orion Orions	Konkuk University (senior)
2	13	Choi Sung-won	G	Seoul SK Knights	Korea University (senior)
2	14	Yoon Sung-won	F	Wonju DB Promy	Hanyang University (senior)
2	15	Incheon Electro Land Elephants forfeited			
2	16	Hong Soon-gyu	C	Seoul Samsung Thunders	Dankook University (senior)
2	17	Son Hong-jun	G	Ulsan Hyundai Mobis Phoebus	Hanyang University
2	18	Jeong Jun-su	F	Seoul Samsung Thunders	Myongji University (senior)
2	19	Lee Kun-hee	F	Changwon LG Sakers	Kyung Hee University
2	20	Changwon LG Sakers forfeited			

== Players ==
Traditionally, players joined the draft after completing their senior season and were fourth-year students at their respective universities. This draft marked the first time two freshmen, Yang Hong-seok and Yoo Hyun-jun, were picked so early in the first round, leading observers and pundits to note that "early entry" would likely become a trend in Korean basketball in the future. Point guard Heo Hoon became the first Yonsei University player since Ha Seung-jin in 2008 to be picked first overall.

In March 2021, Yang and Heo simultaneously recorded double-doubles during the play-offs against Anyang KGC. It marked the first time in KBL history two domestic players from the same team simultaneously recorded double-doubles in a single game.

== See also ==
- Korean Basketball League draft
