= Suwon Science College =

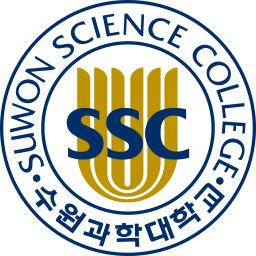
- Type: Private
- Established: 1977
- Parent institution: University of Suwon
- President: Jeong Won Seop (2020)
- Students: 6,544 (2014)
- Undergraduates: 6,544 (2014)
- Location: 288 Seja-ro, Jeongnam-myeon, Hwaseong, Gyeonggi, Republic of Korea
- Language: Korean, some classes in English, Japanese, Chinese
- Colors: Navy, white
- Website: http://www.ssc.ac.kr/

Korean name
- Hangul: 수원과학대학교
- Hanja: 水原科學大學校
- RR: Suwon gwahak daehakgyo
- MR: Suwŏn kwahak taehakkyo

Suwon Science College (Korean: 수원과학대학교) is a part of the University of Suwon established in 1977 as Suwon Technical School.

== Notable academics ==
- Jeong Won Seop - President
