= Park Chan-hee (basketball) =

South Korean basketball player

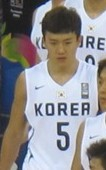

Goyang Sono Skygunners
- Title: Coach
- League: Korean Basketball League

Personal information
- Born: April 17, 1987 (age 39) Yeosu, South Korea
- Listed height: 6 ft 3 in (1.91 m)
- Listed weight: 191 lb (87 kg)

Career information
- High school: Kyungbock
- College: Kyung Hee University
- Playing career: 2010–2024
- Position: Point guard
- Number: 10, 7, 30, 1
- Coaching career: 2025–present

Career history

Playing
- 2010–2016: Anyang KT&G Kites / Anyang KGC
- 2012–2014: → Sangmu
- 2016–2021: Incheon Electroland Elephants
- 2021–2024: Wonju DB Promy

Coaching
- 2024–present: Goyang Sono Skygunners

Career highlights
- KBL Championship (2012); KBL Rookie of the Year (2011); 2× KBL Defensive Player of the Year (2018, 2019); 2× KBL Best 5 (2017, 2019); 3× KBL Defensive Best 5 (2017—2019)
Medals
Men's basketball
Representing South Korea
Asian Games
Gold medal – first place	2014 Incheon	Team
Silver medal – second place	2010 Guangzhou	Team
FIBA Asia Cup
Bronze medal – third place	2011 Wuhan
Bronze medal – third place	2017 Beirut

- Korean name
- Hangul: 박찬희
- Hanja: 朴燦熙
- RR: Bak Chanhui
- MR: Pak Ch'anhŭi

Park Chan-hee (born April 17, 1987) is a South Korean basketball Coach for Goyang Sono Skygunners.

== Early life ==
Park grew up in Yeosu and moved to Seoul after his father got a job in Incheon. He first became interested in basketball as an elementary school student after seeing a game broadcast on television. In 2004 he first drew attention after leading Kyungbock High School to win two high school tournaments.

== College career ==
Despite receiving offers from Yonsei University and Korea University, Park committed to Kyung Hee University. At that time, Kyung Hee, although well-known for its College of Physical Education, was not considered a major contender in college basketball. He decided on Kyung Hee as he would be guaranteed playing time as a freshman. However, he almost gave up the sport after going through a long slump in form during his sophomore year and then going through surgery on his toe during his junior year. During his senior year, Park was joined by high school seniors and Kyung Hee prospects Kim Jong-kyu and Kim Min-goo. They led Kyung Hee to the semi-finals of the National Basketball Festival, the main collegiate competition at that time, but were knocked out by a Lee Jung-hyun-inspired Yonsei team.

== Professional career ==
Park was the first overall pick of the 2010 KBL rookie draft and was drafted by Anyang KT&G. It was only the second time in the history of the KBL rookie draft that the first overall pick was not from Yonsei University, Korea University or Chung-Ang University, which are collectively known as the "big 3" of domestic college basketball. His rookie season did not begin smoothly as he struggled to adapt to the professional game and Anyang finished second-last in the league table. He averaged 12.0 points and played in 44 out of 54 games. Despite Anyang's poor results, the relatively young squad – which also included guards Kim Tae-sul and Lee Jung-hyun and forward Yang Hee-jong – were highlighted as future stars. Park would go on to win the Rookie of the Year award.

He enlisted for mandatory military service in April 2012 and joined the Sangmu team after completing basic training. He was discharged in January 2014.

Park was traded to Incheon Electroland Elephants for Han Hee-won in 2016. He led them to the play-offs and became the team's main point guard due to injury problems and underwhelming performances from the other starting point guards.

At the end of the 2020-21 season, Incheon Electroland Elephants was in the process of being bought over by another company and relocated to another city. Park decided to leave and was traded to Wonju DB Promy together with Kang Sang-jae in exchange for Doo Kyung-min.

=== National team ===
Park was selected for the 2010 Asian Games despite having just turned professional. He has participated in two FIBA World Cups, the 2014 and 2019 editions.

== Personal life ==
Park has been married since 2015. He and his wife have a son Si-yu (born 2016).

Park's younger brother Park Chan-woong is a former SPOTV commentator who also played college basketball for Kyung Hee University.
