= MBC Cup =

Annual basketball competition in South Korea

Tournament information
- Sport: College basketball
- Location: South Korea
- Established: 1985
- Format: Knock-out elimination
- Teams: 12 (men's)

Current champion
- 2021; Men's Division 1: Yonsei University (11th title); Men's Division 2: University of Ulsan (1st title); Women's: Dankook University (1st title)

The MBC Cup (Korean: MBC배) is an annual competition organized by the Korea University Basketball Federation (Korean: 한국대학농구연맹) and sponsored by broadcaster Munhwa Broadcasting Corporation (MBC). It is one of the oldest basketball competitions in South Korea for college teams and predates the U-League. In Korean-language media, it is known by its full name MBC Cup National University Basketball Championship (Korean: MBC배 전국대학농구대회) to differentiate it from another similarly named competitions for college students in other sports.

Prior to the establishment of the professional Korean Basketball League in 1997, basketball was an amateur sport and all senior teams participated in the National Basketball Festival (Korean: 농구대잔치), regardless of whether it was sponsored by the Korea Armed Forces Athletic Corps, corporate companies or universities. The MBC Cup was considered unique for that era as it was strictly limited to college teams.

Up until the 2000s, the tournament was primarily hosted by Jamsil Students' Gymnasium in Seoul, hence the name of the venue. The tournament was later marketed as a tournament part of the wider nationwide multi-sport National Youth Sports Festival for student-athletes and has been hosted by various cities.

== Teams ==
The competition is open to member universities of the Korea University Basketball Federation (KUBF). In the men's competition, Division 1 teams also participate in the KUSF U-League, the elite level of competition. Division 2 teams participate in the KUSF Club Championship. In the women's competition, both U-League and non-U-League teams play against each other.

== Winners ==
=== Men's competition — Division 1 ===
Year	Host city	Winner	Runner-up	MVP	Ref./Notes
1985		Chung-Ang University	Yonsei University	Kim Tae-kyung	
1986		Korea University	Kyung Hee University		
1987		Hanyang University	Kyung Hee University	Kim Jong-suk	
1988		Korea University	Yonsei University	Lee Wan-kyu	
1989		Yonsei University	Chung-Ang University	Yoo Do-hoon (Yonsei University)	
1990		Yonsei University	Korea University	Lee Sang-beom (Yonsei University)	
1991		Chung-Ang University	Kyung Hee University	Jung Kyung-ho (Chung-Ang University)	
1992		Yonsei University	Chung-Ang University	Moon Kyung-eun (Yonsei University)	
1993		Yonsei University	Chung-Ang University	Moon Kyung-eun (Yonsei University)	
1994		Korea University	Yonsei University	Park Jae-heon (Korea University)	
1995		Korea University	Yonsei University	Chun Hee-chul (Korea University)	
1996		Korea University	Yonsei University	Yang Hee-seung (Korea University)	
1997		Yonsei University	Kyung Hee University	Seo Jang-hoon (Yonsei University)	
1998		Kyung Hee University	Myongji University	Kang Hyuk (Kyung Hee University)	
1999	Seoul	Chung-Ang University	Korea University	Im Jae-hyun (Chung-Ang University)	
2000	Seoul	Chung-Ang University	Sungkyunkwan University	Hwang Jin-won (Chung-Ang University)	
2001	Seoul	Sungkyunkwan University	Chung-Ang University	Jung Hoon (Sungkyunkwan University)	
2002	Seoul	Yonsei University	Korea University	Kim Dong-woo (Yonsei University)	
2003	Seoul	Yonsei University	Hanyang University	Lee Jung-hyeop (Yonsei University)	
2004	Ansan, Gyeonggi Province	Yonsei University	Chung-Ang University	Bang Sung-yoon (Yonsei University)	
2005	Yongin, Gyeonggi Province	Yonsei University	Chung-Ang University	Jeon Jung-kyu (Yonsei University)	
2006	Seoul	Chung-Ang University	Kyung Hee University	Ham Ji-hoon (Chung-Ang University)	
2007	Gimhae, South Gyeongsang Province	Chung-Ang University	Korea University	Yoon Ho-young (Chung-Ang University)	
2008	Gimcheon, North Gyeongsang Province	Chung-Ang University	Kyung Hee University	Park Sung-jin (Chung-Ang University)	
2009	Gimcheon, North Gyeongsang Province	Chung-Ang University	Dongguk University	Oh Se-keun (Chung-Ang University)	
2010	Yongin, Gyeonggi Province	Chung-Ang University	Kyung Hee University	Kim Sun-hyung (Chung-Ang University)	
2011	Gimcheon, North Gyeongsang Province	Kyung Hee University	Chung-Ang University	Park Rae-hoon (Kyung Hee University)	
2012	Yeongju, North Gyeongsang Province	Kyung Hee University	Korea University	Doo Kyung-min (Kyung Hee University)	
2013	Yeongju, North Gyeongsang Province	Korea University	Kyung Hee University	Lee Jong-hyun (Korea University)	
2014	Suwon, Gyeonggi Province	Korea University	Kyung Hee University	Lee Seoung-hyun (Korea University)	
2015	Gyeongsan, North Gyeongsang Province	Korea University	Yonsei University	Lee Dong-yeop (Korea University)	
2016	Suwon, Gyeonggi Province	Yonsei University	Dankook University	Choi Jun-yong (Yonsei University)	
2017	Yeonggwang County, South Jeolla Province	Korea University	Yonsei University	Kim Nak-hyeon (Korea University)	
2018	Sangju, North Gyeongsang Province	Korea University	Yonsei University	Jeon Hyun-woo (Korea University)	
2019	Sangju, North Gyeongsang Province	Korea University	Chung-Ang University	Park Jeong-hyun (Korea University)	
2020	Cancelled due to COVID-19 pandemic				
2021	Sangju, North Gyeongsang Province	Yonsei University	Hanyang University	Lee Jung-hyun (Yonsei University)	(Note: Korea University opted out due to students testing positive for COVID-19.)

=== Men's competition — Division 2 ===
Year	Host city	Winner	Runner-up	Ref.
2009	Gimcheon, North Gyeongsang Province	Sangmyung University	Chodang University	(Note: Sangmyung University's first ever appearance in the competition, having only established its basketball team earlier that year. They were later promoted to Division 1 in 2010.)
2012	Yeongju, North Gyeongsang Province	Chodang University	Mokpo National University	
2016	Suwon, Gyeonggi Province	Woosuk University	University of Ulsan	
2017		Mokpo National University	Woosuk University	
2018	Sangju, North Gyeongsang Province	Mokpo National University	Chodang University	
2019	Sangju, North Gyeongsang Province	Mokpo National University	University of Ulsan	
2020	Cancelled due to COVID-19 pandemic			
2021	Sangju, North Gyeongsang Province	University of Ulsan	Mokpo National University	

=== Women's competition ===
Year	Host city	Winner	Runner-up	Ref./Notes
1995		Ewha Womans University	Sookmyung Women's University	
2005	Yongin, Gyeonggi Province	University of Suwon	Yong In University	
2006	Seoul	University of Suwon	Yong In University	
2007	Gimhae, South Gyeongsang Province	University of Suwon	Yong In University	
2008	Gimcheon, North Gyeongsang Province	University of Suwon	Yong In University	
2009	Gimcheon, North Gyeongsang Province	University of Suwon	Gwangju University	
2010	Yongin, Gyeonggi Province	Gwangju University	University of Suwon	
2011	Gimcheon, North Gyeongsang Province	University of Suwon	Hallym Polytechnic University	
2012	Yeongju, North Gyeongsang Province	University of Suwon	Gwangju University	
2013	Yeongju, North Gyeongsang Province	Gwangju University	University of Suwon	
2014	Suwon, Gyeonggi Province	Yong In University	Vision College of Jeonju	
2015	Gyeongsan, North Gyeongsang Province	Yong In University	Gwangju University	
2016	Suwon, Gyeonggi Province	Gwangju University	Yong In University	
2017	Yeonggwang County, South Jeolla Province	Gwangju University	Yong In University	
2018	Sangju, North Gyeongsang Province	Gwangju University	University of Suwon	
2019	Sangju, North Gyeongsang Province	Pusan National University	Yong In University	
2020	Cancelled due to COVID-19 pandemic			
2021	Sangju, North Gyeongsang Province	Dankook University	Gwangju University	
