= Heo Hoon =

South Korean basketball player

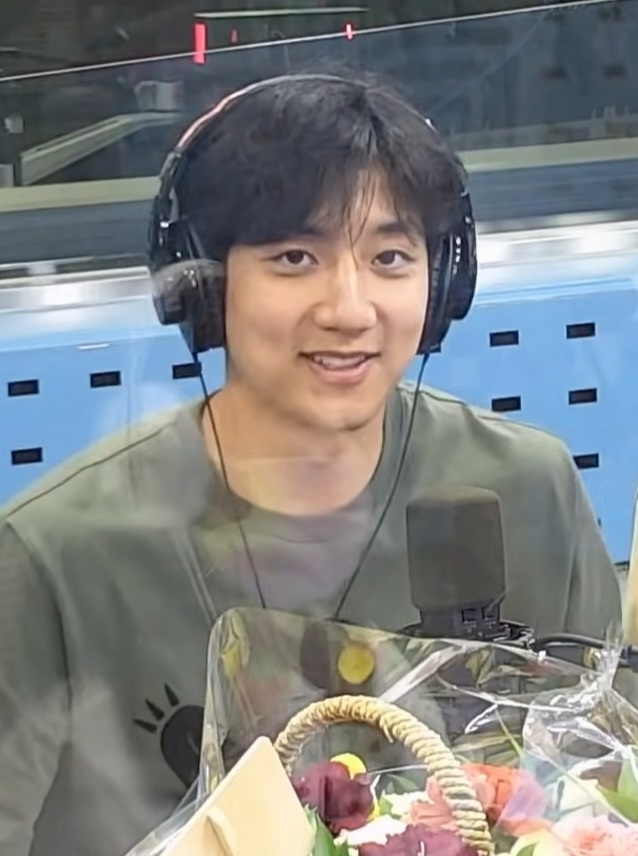

No. 7 – Busan KCC Egis
- Position: Point guard
- League: Korean Basketball League

Personal information
- Born: 16 August 1995 (age 31) Seoul, South Korea
- Listed height: 180 cm (5 ft 11 in)
- Listed weight: 81 kg (179 lb)

Career information
- High school: Yongsan High School
- College: Yonsei University
- KBL draft: 2017: 1st round, 1st overall pick
- Playing career: 2017–present

Career history
- 2017–2025: Suwon KT Sonicboom
- 2022–2023: →Sangmu
- 2025–present: Busan KCC Egis

Career highlights
- KBL Most Valuable Player Award (2020); 2× KBL Best 5 (2020, 2021); KBL Fair Play Award (2022); KBL scoring champion – domestic players (2021); 3× KBL assists leader (2020, 2021, 2025); Dong-A Sports Awards Male Basketball Player of the Year (2020)

- Korean name
- Hangul: 허훈
- Hanja: 許訓
- RR: Heo Hun
- MR: Hŏ Hun

Heo Hoon (born 16 August 1995) is a South Korean professional basketball player. He plays for Busan KCC Egis of the Korean Basketball League and the South Korea national team.

== Early life ==
Heo enjoyed playing various sports from a young age but, due to his father's initial opposition, did not initially harbor dreams of becoming a professional athlete. He and his older brother spent a year-and-a-half of their elementary school years in the United States when their father was sent for coaching training and worked as a coach at Pepperdine University. During this period, the brothers were among the few Asians at their school and played basketball to escape being targets of racism and bullying. The family returned to South Korea when their father became the new Jeonju KCC Egis head coach. They attended their father's alma mater Yongsan Middle School and Yongsan High School, where they excelled at basketball and were called up to the youth national teams.

As a high school student, Heo played a major role in Yongsan High School's run to the final of the National High School Basketball Championship, the main spring tournament, for two consecutive years and was named tournament MVP on both occasions. A highly rated prospect, he was scouted by college basketball powerhouses Yonsei University and Korea University, before ultimately committing to Yonsei where his brother was already attending. He was allowed to join the Yonsei team for the 2013 fall semester while he completed his final year of high school.

== College career ==
Heo majored in sports industry studies at Yonsei University. Although already known to the public for being the younger son of basketball legend Hur Jae, he quickly shed the label after winning the Rookie of the Year award and impressing as a sophomore during the Professional-Amateur Series, an annual tournament in which college teams play a series of practice games against KBL professional teams.

As a junior, Heo was a major contributor to Yonsei winning the MBC Cup for the first time in eleven years, scoring points in the double digits in three out of five tournament games. Despite having the opportunity to declare eligibility early for the 2016 rookie draft, he chose not to as he felt unprepared to go professional and to honor his parents' wishes that he complete his studies. With Choi Jun-yong turning professional and graduating, Heo succeeded him as team captain. Yonsei lost in the MBC Cup final to rival Korea University and also lost out to them in the regular season title but he ended his senior year on a high by leading Yonsei to their second consecutive championship to end Korea University's dominance. He scored against Korea University in both legs of the championship final, recording a double-double in the first leg, and was named championship MVP.

== Professional career ==
=== KT Sonicboom (2017–2025) ===
==== 2017–2020 ====
Heo was drafted by Busan KT Sonicboom in the 2017 rookie draft as their first pick in the first round. Despite being evaluated as one of the more "pro ready" prospects of the draft, there were initial concerns about his height – at 180 cm he was considered short for a guard even by KBL standards. He made his debut in the Korean Basketball League on 7 November 2017 against Seoul SK Knights, with 15 points, 7 assists and 2 rebounds recorded in 23 minutes. His rookie season was overshadowed by an injury which sidelined him for almost a month, him being forced to play in an unfamiliar hybrid shooting guard-cum-point guard role, and KT finishing at the bottom of the league table, but he managed to average 10.6 points in 26 games and establish himself as a regular by the end of the season.

During Heo's second season, new head coach Seo Dong-chul switched tactics and effectively paired him with another guard to alternate between the shooting guard and point guard roles. Alongside fellow 2017 draftee forward Yang Hong-seok, Heo was a major contributor to KT qualifying for the play-offs for the first time in five seasons. He contributed a career-high 25 points, 17 of which was scored in the third quarter alone, in the February game against Seoul SK Knights to end KT's four-game losing streak.

The 2019–20 season was Heo's break-out season, despite the disruption caused by the COVID-19 pandemic during the last few rounds. During the October game against Wonju DB Promy at home, he scored nine consecutive three-point shots, tying Cho Sung-won's fifteen-year-old record for the most consecutive three-point shots in a single game; KT Sonicboom had been trailing the visitors before Heo's fourth quarter record-breaking feat brought the score up but still lost 83–82. In February 2020 against Anyang KGC, he put up 24 points and 21 assists, becoming the first player in KBL history to score over 20 points and 20 assists in a single game. In that same game, he also reached the KBL record for the most assists in a quarter, with eight, tying with Kim Seung-hyun and Moon Tae-jong. Among domestic players, he was the top-scoring guard and ranked second only behind forward Song Kyo-chang of Jeonju KCC Egis by a slim margin of 0.1 points, earning him a reputation as a combo guard equally proficient at scoring points and providing assists. Despite his performances and productive partnership with Yang, KT was only able to finish the season in sixth place, the final play-off spot. He was named into the KBL Best 5 for the first time and voted regular season MVP for the 2019–20 season. With this win, Heo and his father became the first father-son duo in domestic basketball history to win an MVP award; his father had previously won the equivalent several times during the semi-professional pre-KBL era and a play-off MVP in the first season of the newly established KBL. Additionally, his nine consecutive three-pointers were voted "Play of the Season".

==== 2020–2022 ====
The 2020–21 season saw Heo achieve a number of milestones and records. He ended the season with an average of 15.63 points per game, surpassing his previous personal record, and led the league in assists overall (among both domestic and foreign players) for a second consecutive season. Additionally, he became the first domestic player to lead in points scored (among domestic players) and assists (overall), as well as the first domestic player since Seo Jang-hoon to lead in both the domestic and overall statistical categories; Seo led in points scored (domestic) and rebounds (overall) for the 1998–99 season. In the October game against Anyang KGC, he surpassed his personal record for points scored in a single game, scoring 33 points, including a 16-meter buzzer beater from the half-court line to tie the score and force the game into overtime. In December, he was nominated for and won the Male Basketball Player of the Year, voted for by league coaches and his KBL peers, at the annual Dong-a Sports Awards honoring domestic professional athletes across all disciplines. During the March game against Anyang KGC, he and Yang both recorded double-doubles, marking the first time in KBL history two domestic players recorded double-doubles (across all categories) in a single game. Heo's double-double was his tenth of the season, the first time since the 2006–07 season a player has achieved ten or more double-doubles in points and assists. Although he missed out on the season MVP to Song, he was named into the KBL Best 5 for the second consecutive season. He was also named Player of the Year (KBL category) and voted into the "Best 5" of Rookie the Basket magazine's annual Players' Choice Awards.

Heo ruptured his ankle ligaments during a pre-season practice game in September and was out for the entire first round of the 2021–22 season. He returned for the November game against Changwon LG Sakers and contributed 20 points in a 89–80 win. The aftereffects of his injury continued to affect him for the next two months, limiting his playing time. Although his statistics were lower than the previous two seasons, he contributed by scoring in clutch situations and during the second half. He notably scored during decisive moments in several of KT's narrow wins, such as a buzzer beater against Changwon LG Sakers with 2.2 seconds left, the decisive equalizer against Ulsan Hyundai Mobis Phoebus during the last minute of the fourth quarter after orchestrating KT's comeback from a 22-point deficit, and a tie-breaker against Daegu KOGAS Pegasus during the last 30 seconds. In January against Anyang KGC, he became the 48th player in KBL history to reach 1,000 career assists as KT ended a four-game losing streak to win 77–66. In March, he achieved his first double-double (points and assists) of the season.

==== 2022–2025 ====
Heo enlisted for mandatory military service and was assigned to the Sangmu basketball team after the 2021–22 season ended. His contemporaries included several of his national teammates and they led the team to win the first D League title in four years. He scored 26 points in the final against Changwon LG Sakers. Despite not participating in pre-season training, he immediately returned to the line-up just days after his discharge and scored 26 points against Seoul SK Knights in his first game of the 2023–24 season. However he struggled with injuries, including a broken nose in December, and ankle and calf problems that ruled him out for much of January In spite of his injury struggles he maintained an average of 14.9 points in the 13 games he had played in before the January injury lay-off. KT finished fourth in the regular season but still managed to reach the Championship finals for the first time in franchise history. Heo's partnership with Paris Bass was key to KT's historic run, the duo averaging a combined 45 points in 14 games during the playoffs. Busan KCC Egis eventually won the finals 4-1 but Heo was singled out for praise, with various media publications summing up KT's performance during the series as Heo's "one-man show" and KCC coach Jeon Chang-jin praising him in the post-celebrations interview. He put up 37 points in Game 3, the second highest ever recorded by a domestic player during a Championship game, behind his father's former Busan Kia Enterprise teammate small forward Kim Yeong-man; he shares the record with Cho Sung-won and Kim Sun-hyung. His average of 26.6 points in the finals set a new record for domestic players.

Ahead of the 2024–25 season, Heo took over Moon Seong-gon as team captain. His form was inconsistent during the early half of the season due to various minor injuries and overexertion. Due to the lack of consistent scoring options, he was forced to play the first eight games of the season while nursing an injury to his non-dominant (left) wrist, averaging 17.4 points and recording double-doubles in two of those games. The KBL's newly implemented Asian quota allowed KT to sign Filipino rookie guard JD Cagulangan in January, which freed him to return to his playmaking role. He regained his form by Round 6 as KT was battling for a place in the playoffs, ultimately finishing fourth for a second consecutive time in the regular season.

=== KCC Egis (2025–present) ===
Heo's contract with KT ended after the 2024–25 season and was widely expected to re-sign. In May, Busan KCC Egis announced that he had signed a five-year contract, making him the highest-paid domestic player in the league along with veteran Kim Sun-hyung.

== National team career ==
=== Junior national team ===
Heo represented South Korea at the 2011 FIBA Asia Under-16 Championship and 2012 FIBA Under-17 World Championship, where he averaged 17.7 points, 2 rebounds and 2.9 assists. During the latter tournament, he scored 37 points in South Korea's narrow overtime loss to Lithuania and set the competition record for the most points scored in a loss; his record was broken by Australian Isaac Humphries in the 2014 edition. Heo also participated at the 2013 FIBA Under-19 World Championship, where he averaged 12.8 points, 3.4 rebounds and 3.2 assists. He impressed in the group stage match against the Czech Republic team by scoring 39 points in a 96–95 overtime win, the South Koreans' first win of the tournament.

=== Senior national team ===
Having been a regular in the youth national teams, Heo was first called up to the senior national team in 2016 and impressed at the William Jones Cup. He was recalled to the team as an injury replacement for the 2016 FIBA Asia Challenge. After failing to make an impact during the 2017 William Jones Cup, he was left out of the squad for the Asia Cup later that year. Early on, during his father's tenure as the national team coach, his selection was constantly a source of criticism and accusations of favouritism, which came to a head after South Korea failed to defend their gold medal at the 2018 Asian Games. His and his older brother's selections were particularly criticized by the press, resulting in the youngest Heo being left on the substitute's bench for the entire tournament. Both brothers were also excluded from the squad list for the next several games after the Asian Games.

Heo was recalled to the national team by new coach Kim Sang-shik, following his good form in the KBL. He participated in the qualifiers for the 2019 FIBA Basketball World Cup hosted by China and was considered a contender for the final tournament squad. After a good showing at the 2019 William Jones Cup, he made the final squad and was the youngest player selected. At the final tournament, he averaged 4.2 points, 0.4 rebounds and 0.8 assist as he was mostly a substitute player. Having averaged around 5 minutes per game, he played 25 minutes against the Ivory Coast due to injuries plaguing the team. He notably scored 16 points off the bench in an 80–71 win, South Korea's first win at the FIBA World Cup in 25 years.

Heo has participated in the 2022 FIBA Asia Cup qualifiers, but mostly as a reserve due to league commitments and quarantine requirements that discouraged his club from releasing him to the national team more frequently than usual. Heo was recalled by new coach Choo Il-seung for the June 18 and 19 friendlies against the Philippines together with his older brother, marking the first time in four years they had played on the national team at the same time. Both brothers were named in the final 12-man squad for the upcoming Asia Cup. During the qualifiers, Kim Nak-hyeon replaced him as the first option point guard after he drew criticism for lackluster performances against lower-ranked teams; however, Heo played a key role in South Korea finishing at the top of their group at the tournament.

== Player profile ==
Standing at 180 cm (5 ft 11 in), Heo is among the league's shortest players. Equipped with the ability to score from a drive and both inside and outside the paint, he utilizes his lack of height to his advantage by passing under much taller players, evading the defense with various tricks and exploiting tight spaces to create scoring opportunities. He plays exclusively at the point guard position due his role as the main playmaker, but often functions as a combo guard during games if an additional scorer is needed. In addition to his qualities as a point guard, he is especially known for his boldness and composure, and his ability to score crucial clutch points and maintain possession of the ball even when outnumbered and pressured by the opponent's defensive players. However, his versatility as a scorer became a double-edged sword as his past head coaches have often heavily relied on him as the main scoring option during important games, especially during the playoffs or when the forwards and shooting guards are in poor form, leading to overexertion and him having to play while nursing an injury.

Prior to Heo's emergence, high-scoring point guards in domestic basketball were largely uncommon and even frowned upon due to more defensive tactics being preferred from the early 2000s and the KBL being slower than other leagues to embrace the fast-pace offenses that have since become commonplace in international basketball. Domestic basketball observers and retired veterans had lamented the dearth of homegrown point guards able to both adapt to modern fast-paced offenses and also statistically match the levels of legends such as Lee Sang-min, Joo Hee-jung and Kim Seung-hyun, whose prime took place from the early to mid 2000s. By his fifth season as a professional, Heo had become the first point guard to rank first in scoring among domestic players, led in assists for two consecutive seasons and is the only active player to break into the top 10 ranking of all-time for career double-doubles (points and assists) achieved. After Lee, Joo and Kim, Heo became only the fourth player in league history to record 20 or more assists in a single game and is the only one who simultaneously scored 20 or more points in the same game. During the 2024 Championship finals, he set new records for the finals by becoming the first domestic player to score 30 or more points in consecutive games and achieving the highest points average scored by a domestic player.

Heo's flashy style of play, carefree demeanor during games and penchant for the clutch made him a fan favorite and earned him the nickname "Short Foreign Player" (단신 용병) from both fans and the media. His height has been cited as a factor of his appeal to aspiring young basketball players as he is seen as a prime example of overcoming a height disadvantage by strengthening his shooting, dribbling and passing. Commentators have noted that his own background as a legendary athlete's child who had followed in his parents' footsteps and then established himself on his own merit further added to his broad popular appeal among fans of other teams.

== Personal life ==
Heo is the younger son of retired basketball player and coach Hur Jae. His older brother Heo Ung is a professional basketball player for KBL team Busan KCC Egis. Unlike him, both his father and older brother are shooting guards.

The Heo brothers launched a jointly-run YouTube channel called Ko Sambuja (코삼부자), documenting their lives as professional athletes. Ko (코) is the Korean word for nose, a tongue in cheek reference to the brothers and their father having large noses, and sambuja (삼부자) means "father and son trio". In July 2021 they received the Silver Creator Award button for surpassing 100,000 subscribers.

On 16 May 2022, Heo enlisted for mandatory military service and was assigned to the Korea Armed Forces Athletic Corps' Sangmu basketball team. He was discharged on 15 November 2023, ahead of the second round of the 2023–24 season.

Heo was mentioned in the 2023 film Rebound, which was a dramatization of the 2012 National High School Basketball Championship and the exploits of the tournament underdogs and runner-up Busan Jungang High School. Heo had been the main point guard of the Yongsan High School team that narrowly defeated Jungang High School in the final. Initially, he and his high school were not to be named explicitly in any dialogue, but the production team decided against it to add more realism to the plot. Heo granted permission for his name to be used and was portrayed by Lee Seok-min, a former Myongji University player who went undrafted during the 2021 KBL draft.

== Filmography ==
=== Television shows ===
Year	Title	Role	Notes	Ref.
2020	Law of the Jungle in Wild Korea	Recurring cast	Episode 416–419	
2021	Family Register Mate	Special Cast	Two-episode pilot	
2022	Impossible Time	Cast Member		

== See also ==
- List of Korean Basketball League annual statistical leaders
