= University of Suwon =

University in Hwaseong, South Korea

- 수원 대학교
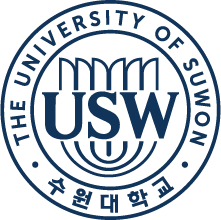
- Established: 1977
- President: Yim Kyeong-sook
- Faculty: 938
- Students: 12,415 (2013)
- Undergraduates: 11,437 (2013)
- Postgraduates: 978 (2013)
- Location: San 2-2, Wau-ri, Bongdam-eup, Hwaseong, Gyeonggi, South Korea; 37°12′33″N 126°58′37″E
- Website: www.suwon.ac.kr
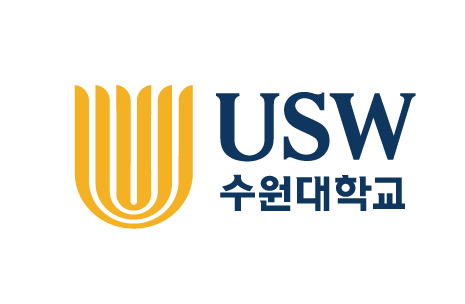

Korean name
- Hangul: 수원대학교
- Hanja: 水原大學校
- RR: Suwon daehakgyo
- MR: Suwŏn taehakkyo

The University of Suwon (Korean: 수원대학교) is a university in Hwaseong, Gyeonggi Province, South Korea. It was established under the Confucian values of Dong-Go Lee Joon-Kyung, one of the most representative scholars in Joseon Dynasty. These values include: Frugality – self-interest with which we pursue truth in a frugal and modest way, Justice – public interest with which we seek to realize sound society with free will and a sense of duty, and Creativity – national interest with which we try to serve the State with challenging and discovering spirit.

Campus in Hwaseong, Gyeonggi Province.

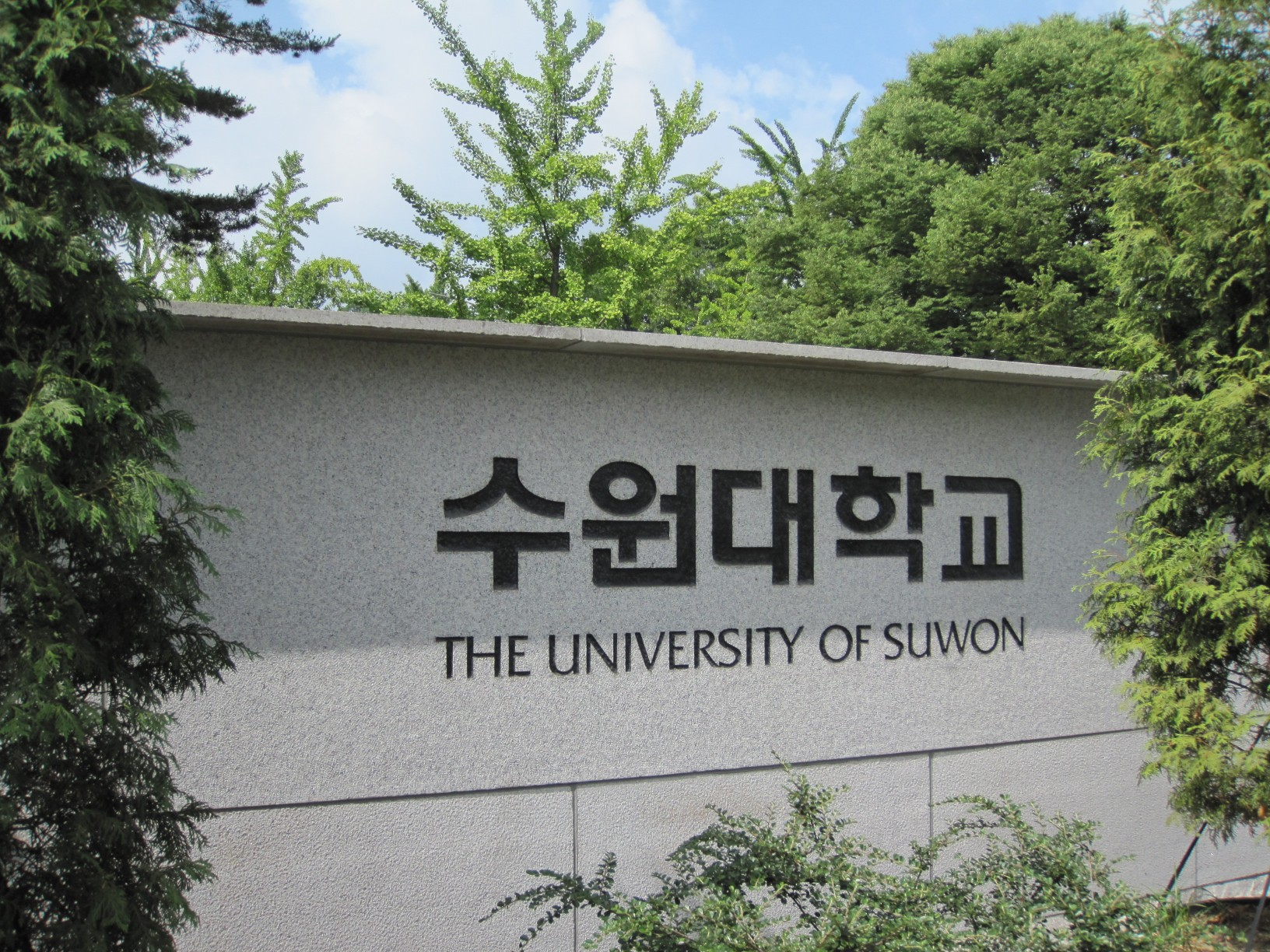
Sign at the University of Suwon front gate.

== Foundation ==
The university was founded by the Kowoon Foundation in 1977 and authorized in 1981 with nine departments. The sister university, Suwon Science College, was founded in the same year. The first matriculation of 250 students took place in 1982.

== International ==
Since the university's first sisterhood relationship agreement with an overseas university was set up in 1985 with Chicago State University, agreements have been arranged with almost 100 universities in 23 countries.

== Academic ==
The University of Suwon comprises 10 undergraduate schools. The first graduate school was opened in 1986 and USW now has eleven graduate schools.

=== Undergraduate schools ===
==== College of Humanities ====
- Department of Liberal Arts and Education
  - International College (including ESL and CSL)
- Department of Korean Language & Literature
- Department of English Language & Literature
- Department of History
- Department of French Language & Literature
- Department of Russian Language & Literature
- Department of Chinese Language & Literature
- Department of Japanese Language & Literature
- Department of Theatre and Film

==== College of Law and Political Sciences ====
- Department of Law
- Department of Public Administration
- Department of Journalism & Mass Communication

==== College of Economics and Business Administration ====
- Department of Economics & Finance
- Department of Business Administration
- Department of Accounting
- Department of Global Business
- Division of Hotel & Tourism

==== College of Human Ecology ====
- Department of Child & Family Welfare
- Department of Food & Nutrition
- Department of Clothing & Textiles

==== College of Natural Sciences ====
- Department of Mathematics
- Department of Physics
- Department of Life Science
- Department of Chemistry
- Department of Bioscience and Biotechnology
- Department of Applied Statistics

==== College of Engineering ====
- Department of Civil Engineering
- Department of Architectural Engineering
- Department of Industrial Information Engineering
- Department of Electronic Materials Engineering
- Department of Urban Planning & Real Estate Department
- Department of Mechanical Engineering
- Department of Polymer Engineering
- Department of Electrical Engineering
- Department of Chemical Engineering
- Department of Environmental Engineering
- Department of Electronic Engineering

==== College of Information Technology ====
- Department of Computer
- Department of Information and Telecommunications
- Department of Internet Information Engineering
- Department of Information Media

==== College of Physical Education ====
- Division of Physical Education
  - Major in Physical Education
  - Major in Sport & Leisure Studies
- Department of Dance
- Department Exercises & Qi-Gong Studies(Night)

==== College of Art & Design ====
- Division of Fine Arts
  - Major in Korean Painting
  - Major in Painting
  - Major in Sculpture
- Division of Design
  - Major in Communication Design
  - Major in Craft Design
  - Major in Fashion Design

==== College of Music ====
- Department of Composition
- Department of Voice
- Department of Piano
- Department of Orchestral Instruments
- Department of Korean Traditional Music
- Department of Musicology

=== Graduate schools ===
- Graduate School
- Graduate School of Public Administration
- Graduate School of Business Administration
- Graduate School of Engineering
- Graduate School of Education
- Graduate School of Social Welfare
- Graduate School of Financial Engineering
- Graduate School of Hotel & Tourism
- Graduate School of Art
- Graduate School of Music Technology
- Graduate School of Music

== Campus and facilities ==
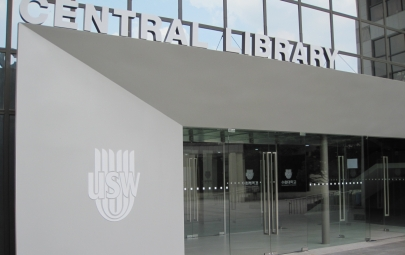
Entrance to the University of Suwon central library.

=== Library ===
The Main Library is divided into the study area and the research area. The study areas on the 1st and 2nd floors are open to everybody, while the research area can be accessed only through B.D.S. on the 3rd floor. Students, graduate students, and professors can engage in research work in the reference rooms on the 4th, 5th, and 6th floors. Since 1993 collections in the library have been added to the database and access to the database through the internet is available inside and outside the university. Since 1997 the library has operated the "electronic library" which enables the use of CD-ROM, microfilms, A/V materials, the satellite broadcasting system and on-line service.

=== Dormitory ===
The dormitory consists of three units with five floors and one basement. It is 12,572 m^{2} (3,800 pyeong) in size and can accommodate 900 students. It started housing students from September 2000. Dormitory rooms are not arranged in the corridor style that is usual in Korean universities. Instead, they are fashioned in the block style that most of the distinguished foreign universities adopt in order to create a family-like environment to share the community spirit and at the same time, keep the independence of each room. The dormitory, which stands on a sunny hill on the campus, helps to alleviate the inconvenience of students having to commute. It also adds to the academic atmosphere of the university and contributes to the social well-being of students from distant places.

=== Health ===
USW Health Service Center is a student welfare organization that provides students with health care services to keep the campus healthy. Services provided include health care, medical treatment, environmental hygiene, and health education.

=== Amaranth Hall ===
Amaranth Hall was constructed in September 2001 to promote students' welfare. In the basement of the hall, there are facilities such as a fitness center with ultramodern equipment, computer rooms with high speed internet access, a billiards room, and performance rooms for dance and play. On the first floor, there are facilities such as the students' dining room with a capacity of 400 seats, snack corner with 30 seats, a store and lounge. On the second floor are the faculty dining room, lounge and seminar room.

=== R.O.T.C. (Reserve Officers' Training Corps) ===
The R.O.T.C. program was introduced to the university in 1984. Candidates are selected in March every year among applicants based on their academic performance and the results of a physical examination. Selected candidates who get good grades and serve as role models for others may get a scholarship. R.O.T.C. educates candidates in various courses such as military science, computer, and Chinese letters so that they may grow into leaders in the army and the modern society of information and industry. They are commissioned officers on completion of extended military training after graduation.

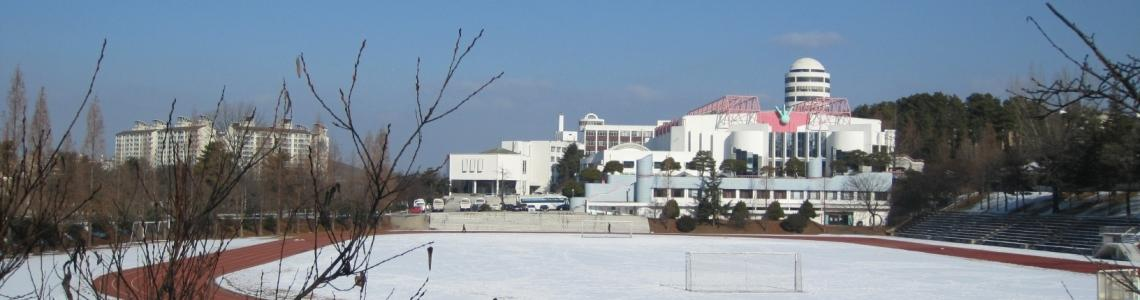
The University of Suwon sports field in winter

== Annual events ==
Each year, the Pegasus spring festival, named after the university symbol, is held in May. During this time, the streets on campus are closed to vehicles and crowded with students socializing and taking part in different events. Pegasus sports competitions in athletics, football, basketball, foot volleyball, kickball and dodgeball take place in September. The Founder's Day opening ceremony is held on September 25.

== Adjunct institutes ==
- Korean language institute
- Lifelong Education Center
- Suwon Science College

== Notable people ==
- Boom, entertainer
- Choi Jong-hoon, former singer (F.T. Island)
- Hwang Jung-eum, actress and singer (Sugar)
- Kim Seung-woo, actor
- Na Hyun-hee, actress and singer
- Oh Eun-sun, mountaineer
- Oh Won-bin, singer (F.T. Island)
- Ryu Jun-yeol, actor
- Shim Hyung-tak, actor
- Shin Sung-rok, actor
- So Yi-hyun, actress
- Lee Min-ji, actress
- Kang Hoon, actor
