= Chodang University =

University in Muan County, South Korea

Coordinates: 34°58′40″N 126°28′22″E

- 초당대학교
- Motto: Sympathizing Right Recognition and Putting it into Action
- Established: 1994
- President: Boung-Sik, Kim
- Location: Muan County, South Jeolla, South Korea
- Website: http://www.chodang.ac.kr/

- Chodang University
- Hangul: 초당대학교
- Hanja: 草堂大學校
- RR: Chodang daehakgyo
- MR: Ch'odang taehakkyo

Chodang University (Korean: 초당대학교) is the only university in Muan County, a largely rural district of South Korea's South Jeolla province. The current president is Boung-Sik, Kim.

== See also ==
- List of colleges and universities in South Korea
- Education in South Korea
