= Mokpo National University =

Public university in Muan and Mokpo, South Korea

Coordinates: 34.91030°N 126.43617°E

- 목포대학교
- Motto: 창조, 덕의, 봉사; Creativity, Morality, Service
- Type: National
- Established: 1946
- President: PARK, Min-Seo
- Students: 12,761 (2011)
- Location: Muan (Dorim Campus), Mokpo (Mokpo Campus), Jeollanam-do, South Korea
- Website: mokpo.ac.kr

Korean name
- Hangul: 목포대학교
- Hanja: 木浦大學校
- RR: Mokpo daehakgyo
- MR: Mokp'o taehakkyo

Mokpo National University is a public university in Muan and Mokpo, South Korea. The school was founded in 1946 and was named Mokpo Normal School. In 1964, it was changed to Mokpo College of Education. In 1978, it was reorganized into Mokpo Elementary School. In 1979, it was upgraded to a four-year university. In 1990, it was upgraded to Mokpo National University, a comprehensive university. In 2024, family members of the victims of the Jeju Air Flight 2216 accident were temporarily accommodated here.

== Presidents ==
- 1st BAE, Jong-moo | PhD, Literature
- 2nd LEE, Tae-geun | PhD, Law
- 3rd NO, Jin-young | PhD, Law
- 4th KIM, Woong-bae | PhD, Literature
- 5th IM, Byoung-sun | PhD, Science
- 6th KO, Suk-kyu | PhD, Literature (2010-2014)
- 7th CHOI, Il | PhD, Engineering (2014~2018)
- 8th PARK, Min-seo | PhD, Social Welfare (2018~present)

== See also ==
- List of national universities in South Korea
- List of universities and colleges in South Korea
- Education in Korea
