= KBL Best 5 =

Korean Basketball League awards

The KBL Best 5 (Korean: 베스트 5) an annual honor bestowed on the best players in the Korean Basketball League following every season. The honor is analogous to the "All-NBA Team" in the NBA or "Team of the Year" in association football. Voting is conducted by a panel of KBL-registered reporters and journalists who exclusively cover the sport. Both domestic and foreign players are eligible for selection.

"One-club man" Yang Dong-geun holds the all-time record for the most number of selections, with nine, and Seo Jang-hoon and Kim Joo-sung are jointly ranked second, with eight selections. Moon Tae-jong and his younger brother Moon Tae-young were both selected for the 2013–14 season's Best 5, the only occasion where a pair of brothers were simultaneously selected. Heo Ung and Heo Hoon are the only other pair of brothers who have been voted into the Best 5, albeit on separate occasions.

== Selections ==
^	Denotes players who are still active in the KBL
*	Denotes players who have been voted into the KBL All-Time Legend 12
Player (X)	Denotes the number of times the player has been selected
**Player** **(in bold text)**	Indicates the player who won the KBL Most Valuable Player in the same year

=== 1997 to 2018–19 ===
From the inception of the honor, voters have selected two guards, two forwards and a center. Best 5 teams are listed according to their positions in the following descending order: two guards, two forwards and a center. The positions are generally the position the player is registered as with the KBL but "swingman" players may be listed under the position they played the most in for that particular season, resulting several players being voted into the Best 5 on different occasions in different positions.

Season	Best 5	
Season	Players	Teams
1997 (Note: Domestic basketball was then an amateur sport and the inaugural season of the professional league began play in February 1997 to allow for a smooth transition.)
1997	**Kang Dong-hee**	Busan Kia Enterprise
1997	(United States) Gerald Walker	Anyang SBS Stars
1997	Jung Jae-kun	Anyang SBS Stars
1997	Chun Hee-chul*	Daegu Tongyang Orions
1997	(United States) Jason Williford	Wonju Naray Blue Bird
1997–98
1997–98	**Lee Sang-min***	Daejeon Hyundai Dynat
1997–98	Kang Dong-hee (2)	Busan Kia Enterprise
1997–98	Moon Kyung-eun*	Suwon Samsung Thunders
1997–98	(United States) Johnny McDowell*	Daejeon Hyundai Dynat
1997–98	(United States) Keenan Jourdon	Daegu Tongyang Orions
1998–99
1998–99	**Lee Sang-min*** (2)	Daejeon Hyundai Dynat
1998–99	Kang Dong-hee (3)	Busan Kia Enterprise
1998–99	Kim Young-man	Busan Kia Enterprise
1998–99	(United States) Johnny McDowell* (2)	Daejeon Hyundai Dynat
1998–99	Seo Jang-hoon*	Cheongju SK Knights
1999–00
1999–00	Kang Dong-hee (4)	Busan Kia Enterprise
1999–00	Cho Sung-won	Daejeon Hyundai Gullivers
1999–00	Hur Jae*	Wonju Sambo Xers
1999–00	(United States) Johnny McDowell* (3)	Daejeon Hyundai Gullivers
1999–00	**Seo Jang-hoon*** (2)	Cheongju SK Knights
2000–01
2000–01	Joo Hee-jung*	Suwon Samsung Thunders
2000–01	Kang Dong-hee (5)	Busan Kia Enterprise
2000–01	**Cho Sung-won** (2)	Changwon LG Sakers
2000–01	(United States) Artemus McClary	Suwon Samsung Thunders
2000–01	(United States) Jackie Jones	Cheongju SK Knights
2001–02
2001–02	**Kim Seung-hyun**	Daegu Tongyang Orions
2001–02	Lee Sang-min* (3)	Jeonju KCC Egis
2001–02	Moon Kyung-eun* (2)	Incheon SK Bigs
2001–02	(United States) Marcus Hicks	Daegu Tongyang Orions
2001–02	Seo Jang-hoon* (3)	Seoul SK Knights
2002–03
2002–03	Kang Dong-hee (6)	Changwon LG Sakers
2002–03	**Kim Byung-chul**	Daegu Tongyang Orions
2002–03	Kim Joo-sung*	Wonju TG Xers
2002–03	(United States) Marcus Hicks (2)	Daegu Tongyang Orions
2002–03	Seo Jang-hoon* (4)	Seoul Samsung Thunders
2003–04
2003–04	Kim Seung-hyun (2)	Daegu Orions
2003–04	Lee Sang-min* (4)	Jeonju KCC Egis
2003–04	**Kim Joo-sung*** (2)	Wonju TG Sambo Xers
2003–04	(Cameroon) / (Canada) Charles Minlend	Jeonju KCC Egis
2003–04	Seo Jang-hoon* (5)	Seoul Samsung Thunders
2004–05
2004–05	Kim Seung-hyun (3)	Daegu Orions
2004–05	**Shin Ki-sung**	Wonju TG Sambo Xers
2004–05	Hyun Joo-yup*	Busan KTF Magic Wings
2004–05	Kim Joo-sung* (3)	Wonju TG Sambo Xers
2004–05	Seo Jang-hoon* (6)	Seoul Samsung Thunders
2005–06
2005–06	Kim Seung-hyun (4)	Daegu Orions
2005–06	**Yang Dong-geun*** (Note: Yang Dong-geun and Seo Jang-hoon were joint winners of the KBL Most Valuable Player Award for the 2005–06 season.)	Ulsan Mobis Phoebus
2005–06	(United States) Chris Williams	Ulsan Mobis Phoebus
2005–06	Kim Joo-sung* (4)	Wonju Dongbu Promy
2005–06	**Seo Jang-hoon*** (7)	Seoul Samsung Thunders
2006–07
2006–07	**Yang Dong-geun*** (2)	Ulsan Mobis Phoebus
2006–07	Joo Hee-jung* (2)	Anyang KT&G
2006–07	Bang Seung-yoon	Seoul SK Knights
2006–07	(United States) Pete Mickeal	Daegu Orions
2006–07	(Nigeria) Olumide Oyedeji	Seoul Samsung Thunders
2007–08
2007–08	Joo Hee-jung* (3)	Anyang KT&G
2007–08	Kim Tae-sul	Seoul SK Knights
2007–08	Kim Joo-sung* (5)	Wonju Dongbu Promy
2007–08	Terrence Shannon Sr. (Note: Award was revoked after the KBL permanently expelled Shannon due to his drug possession charges.)	Incheon Electroland Black Slammer
2007–08	**Seo Jang-hoon*** (8)	Jeonju KCC Egis
2008–09
2008–09	**Joo Hee-jung*** (4)	Anyang KT&G
2008–09	(Canada) Brian Kim (Kim Hyo-bum)	Ulsan Mobis Phoebus
2008–09	Choo Seung-gyun*	Jeonju KCC Egis
2008–09	Kim Joo-sung* (6)	Wonju Dongbu Promy
2008–09	(United States) Terrence Leather	Seoul Samsung Thunders
2009–10
2009–10	Yang Dong-geun* (3)	Ulsan Mobis Phoebus
2009–10	(United States) Tony Akins (Note: Akins was later known by his Korean name Chon Tae-poong (전태풍) after obtaining South Korean citizenship and renouncing his American citizenship as South Korean law did not allow for dual nationality at that time.)	
2009–10	**Ham Ji-hoon**^	Ulsan Mobis Phoebus
2009–10	(United States) (South Korea) Greg Stevenson (Note: Stevenson has been known by his Korean name Moon Tae-young (문태영) after obtaining South Korean citizenship through his Korean mother.)	Changwon LG Sakers
2009–10	Ha Seung-jin	Jeonju KCC Egis
2010–11
2010–11	Yang Dong-geun* (4)	Ulsan Mobis Phoebus
2010–11	Cho Sung-min	Busan KT Sonicboom
2010–11	**Park Sang-oh**	Busan KT Sonicboom
2010–11	Moon Tae-jong	Incheon Electroland Elephants
2010–11	Ha Seung-jin (2)	Jeonju KCC Egis
2011–12
2011–12	Yang Dong-geun* (5)	Ulsan Mobis Phoebus
2011–12	Kim Tae-sul (2)	Anyang KGC
2011–12	Kim Joo-sung* (7)	Wonju Dongbu Promy
2011–12	**Yun Ho-young**^	Wonju Dongbu Promy
2011–12	Oh Se-keun^	Anyang KGC
2012–13
2012–13	Yang Dong-geun* (6)	Ulsan Mobis Phoebus
2012–13	**Kim Sun-hyung**^	Seoul SK Knights
2012–13	(United States) Aaron Haynes*	Seoul SK Knights
2012–13	Moon Tae-young (2)	Ulsan Mobis Phoebus
2012–13	(Belize) (United States) Leon Williams (Note: Joint selection in the center position)	Goyang Orions
2012–13	(United States) Rod Benson	Ulsan Mobis Phoebus
2013–14
2013–14	Yang Dong-geun* (7)	Ulsan Mobis Phoebus
2013–14	Cho Sung-min (2)	Busan KT Sonicboom
2013–14	**Moon Tae-jong** (2)	Changwon LG Sakers
2013–14	Moon Tae-young (3)	Ulsan Mobis Phoebus
2013–14	Davon Jefferson (Note: Award was nullified after his expulsion from the KBL)	Changwon LG Sakers
2014–15
2014–15	**Yang Dong-geun*** (8)	Ulsan Mobis Phoebus
2014–15	Kim Sun-hyung^ (2)	Seoul SK Knights
2014–15	Kim Joo-sung* (8)	Wonju Dongbu Promy
2014–15	Moon Tae-young (4)	Ulsan Mobis Phoebus
2014–15	(United States) Ricardo Ratliffe^ (Note: Ratliffe became a naturalized South Korean citizen in 2018 and has gone by his Korean name Ra Gun-ah (라건아) since then.)	Ulsan Mobis Phoebus
2015–16
2015–16	**Yang Dong-geun*** (9)	Ulsan Mobis Phoebus
2015–16	(United States) Andre Emmett	Jeonju KCC Egis
2015–16	Ham Ji-hoon^ (2)	Ulsan Mobis Phoebus
2015–16	Lee Jung-hyun^ (Note: Joint selection in the forward position)	Anyang KGC
2015–16	(United States) Troy Gillenwater	Changwon LG Sakers
2015–16	Ha Seung-jin (3)	Jeonju KCC Egis
2016–17
2016–17	Lee Jung-hyun^ (2)	Jeonju KCC Egis
2016–17	Park Chan-hee^	Incheon Electroland Elephants
2016–17	Lee Seoung-hyun^	Goyang Orion Orions
2016–17	(United States) Aaron Haynes* (2)	Goyang Orion Orions
2016–17	**Oh Se-keun**^ (2)	Anyang KGC
2017–18
2017–18	**Doo Kyung-min**^	Wonju DB Promy
2017–18	Lee Jung-hyun^ (3)	Jeonju KCC Egis
2017–18	(United States) Deonte Burton	Wonju DB Promy
2017–18	(United States) Aaron Haynes* (3)	Seoul SK Knights
2017–18	Oh Se-keun^ (3)	Anyang KGC
2018–19
2018–19	**Lee Jung-hyun**^ (4)	Jeonju KCC Egis
2018–19	Park Chan-hee^ (2)	Incheon Electroland Elephants
2018–19	Yang Hong-seok^	Busan KT Sonicboom
2018–19	Ham Ji-hoon^ (3)	Ulsan Hyundai Mobis Phoebus
2018–19	Ra Gun-ah^ (2)	Ulsan Hyundai Mobis Phoebus

=== 2019–20 to present ===
From the 2019–20 season onwards, the season's five best players are selected by voters without regard to position. The five players who received the most votes are selected. Players are listed in descending order by number of votes received.

Season	Best 5	
Season	Players	Teams
2019–20 (Note: Due to the COVID-19 pandemic, in March 2020, the KBL board of directors voted to end the season early, in the middle of the fifth round, and cancel the play-offs. Instead the KBL board of directors declared Wonju DB Promy and Seoul SK Knights as joint first place on the league table.)
2019–20	**Heo Hoon**^	Busan KT Sonicboom
2019–20	Kim Jong-kyu^	Wonju DB Promy
2019–20	Song Kyo-chang^	Jeonju KCC Egis
2019–20	(United States) Jameel Warney^	Seoul SK Knights
2019–20	(Haiti) Cady Lalanne	Changwon LG Sakers
2020–21
2020–21	Heo Hoon^ (2)	Busan KT Sonicboom
2020–21	**Song Kyo-chang**^ (2)	Jeonju KCC Egis
2020–21	(United States) Shawn Long	Ulsan Hyundai Mobis Phoebus
2020–21	Lee Dae-sung^	Goyang Orion Orions
2020–21	Yang Hong-seok^ (2)	Busan KT Sonicboom
2021–22	**Choi Jun-yong**^	Seoul SK Knights
2021–22	(United States) Jameel Warney^ (2)	Seoul SK Knights
2021–22	Lee Dae-sung^ (2)	Goyang Orion Orions
2021–22	Heo Ung^	Wonju DB Promy
2021–22	Jeon Sung-hyeon^	Anyang KGC
2022–23	**Kim Sun-hyung**^ (3)	Seoul SK Knights
2022–23	Byeon Jun-hyeong^	Anyang KGC
2022–23	(United States) Jameel Warney^ (3)	Seoul SK Knights
2022–23	Jeon Sung-hyeon^ (2)	Goyang Carrot-Day One Jumpers
2022–23	(United States) Omari Spellman^	Anyang KGC
2023–24	Lee Jung-hyun^	Goyang Sono Skygunners
2023–24	Kang Sang-jae^	Wonju DB Promy
2023–24	(United States) **Ethan Alvano**^	Wonju DB Promy
2023–24	(United States) Paris Bass	Suwon KT Sonicboom
2023–24	(United States) Dedric Lawson	Wonju DB Promy
2024–25	(United States) Jameel Warney^ (4)	Seoul SK Knights
2024–25	**An Young–jun**^	Seoul SK Knights
2024–25	Kim Sun-hyung^ (4)	Seoul SK Knights
2024–25	(Philippines) Carl Tamayo^	Changwon LG Sakers
2024–25	(Egypt) Assem Marei	Changwon LG Sakers
2025–26	**Lee Jung-hyun**^ (2)	Goyang Sono Skygunners
2025–26	(Egypt) Assem Marei^ (2)	Changwon LG Sakers
2025–26	(United States) Jameel Warney^ (5)	Seoul SK Knights
2025–26	(United States) Ethan Alvano^ (2)	Wonju DB Promy
2025–26	An Young–jun^ (2)	Seoul SK Knights

== Multi-time winners ==
# of Selections	Player	Team(s)	Years
9	Yang Dong-geun	Ulsan Hyundai Mobis Phoebus	2005–06, 2006–07, 2009–10, 2010–11, 2011–12, 2012–13, 2013–14, 2014–15, 2015–16
8	Seo Jang-hoon	Cheongju SK Knights / Seoul Samsung Thunders	1998–99, 1999–00, 2001–02, 2002–03, 2003–04, 2004–05, 2005–06, 2007–08
8	Kim Joo-sung	Wonju DB Promy	2002–03, 2003–04, 2004–05, 2005–06, 2007–08, 2008–09, 2011–12, 2014–15
6	Kang Dong-hee	Busan Kia Enterprise / Changwon LG Sakers	1997, 1997–98, 1998–99, 1999–00, 2000–01, 2002–03
5	(United States) Jameel Warney	Seoul SK Knights	2019–20, 2021–22, 2022–23, 2024–25, 2025–26
4	Lee Sang-min	Daejeon Hyundai / Jeonju KCC Egis	1997–98, 1998–99, 2001–02, 2003–04
4	Joo Hee-jung	Suwon Samsung Thunders / Anyang KT&G	2000–01, 2006–07, 2007–08, 2008–09
4	Kim Seung-hyun	Daegu Orions	2001–02, 2003–04, 2004–05, 2005–06
4	Moon Tae-young	Changwon LG Sakers / Ulsan Mobis Phoebus	2009–10, 2012–13, 2013–14, 2014–15
4	Lee Jung-hyun	Anyang KGC / Jeonju KCC Egis	2015–16, 2016–17, 2017–18, 2018–19
4	Kim Sun-hyung	Seoul SK Knights / Suwon KT Sonicboom	2012–13, 2014–15, 2022–23, 2024–25
3	(United States) Johnny McDowell	Daejeon Hyundai Dynat / Gullivers	1997–98, 1998–99, 1999–00
3	Ha Seung-jin	Jeonju KCC Egis	2009–10, 2010–11, 2015–16
3	Ham Ji-hoon	Ulsan Hyundai Mobis Phoebus	2009–10, 2015–16, 2018–19
3	Oh Se-keun	Anyang KGC	2011–12, 2016–17, 2017–18
3	(United States) Aaron Haynes	Seoul SK Knights / Goyang Orion Orions	2012–13, 2016–17, 2017–18
