= Korean Basketball League draft =

Annual event in South Korea

The Korean Basketball League rookie draft (Korean: 한국프로농구 신인드래프트) is an annual event that allows teams to take turns selecting amateur basketball players and other eligible players. Eligible players attend a series of try-outs organized by the KBL roughly analogous to the NFL Scouting Combine and NBA Draft Combine, where they have their height, arm span and other measurements taken. Their predicted draft rankings are not based solely on their performances during the try-outs as players are evaluated much earlier from their performances during the U-League season, at high school tournaments or in the senior national team.

== Eligibility ==
Only South Korean citizens (FIBA-registered nationality) are eligible to be drafted. Foreign players are drafted separately due to an existing foreign player quota while foreign players who have a Korean parent but hold a foreign nationality may be drafted through the ethnic draft and not be counted as a foreign player.

The applicant must first be registered with the Korean Basketball Association as an amateur in order to be eligible for the draft. Regardless of background, all applicants must apply through a "general public draft" (Korean: 일반인 드래프트). Generally, there are two categories of applicants:

- 1) Players enrolled in and playing for a university registered as a Division 1 member of the Korean Universities Basketball Federation (KUBF)
- 2) Other categories of amateur players, which include:
  - High school students in their final year of high school (Korean: 고3; high school senior) who wish to enter the professional league without playing college basketball
  - South Korean nationals who played for a high school or university team outside South Korea
  - Undrafted players from the previous year
  - University students playing for a KUBF Division 2 institution
  - Players from a KUBF Division 1-member institution but had taken a leave of absence from the team and wish to return

All players go through a try-out and have their height, weight and arm span measurements taken. Players from the first category are then automatically added to the KBL's rookie list while players from the second category must pass another try-out which includes playing in a series of 3x3 and 5x5 games, with KBL scouts and coaches in attendance. Their names are then added to the rookie list if nominated.

== Venue ==
From its inception until 2012, the draft took place in a hotel convention room or exhibition hall. Since 2013, it has taken place at the Jamsil Students' Gymnasium in Seoul. Prior to COVID-19, family members and selected guests, mainly the candidates' college teammates or coaches, were allowed to attend.

== List of first overall picks ==
^	Denotes players who have been voted into the KBL All-Time Legend 12
*	Denotes players who have won the KBL Most Valuable Player Award
Player (in italic text)	Rookie of the Year
PPG	Points per game (Note: All statistics are taken from the players' respective rookie season unless otherwise noted.)
APG	Assists per game
RPG	Rebounds per game

Draft	Player	Selected by	College	Draft venue	KBL rookie statistics			Ref.
Draft	Player	Selected by	College	Draft venue	PPG	APG	RPG	Ref.
1998	Hyun Joo-yup^	Cheongju SK Knights	Korea University	Hilton Hotel, Seoul	23.9	4.6	6.4	
1999	Cho Sang-hyun	Gwangju Nasan Flamans	Yonsei University	Seoul Education and Culture Center				
2000	Lee Kyu-sup	Suwon Samsung Thunders	Korea University					
2001	Song Young-jin	Changwon LG Sakers	Chung-Ang University					
2002	Kim Joo-sung*^	Wonju TG Xers	Chung-Ang University					
2003	Kim Dong-woo	Ulsan Mobis Automons	Yonsei University					
2004	Yang Dong-geun*^	Jeonju KCC Egis	Hanyang University					
2005	Bang Sung-yoon	Busan KTF Magic Wings	Yonsei University					
2006	Jeon Jeong-gyu	Incheon Electroland Black Slammer	Yonsei University					
2007	Kim Tae-sul	Seoul SK Knights	Yonsei University	Seoul Education and Culture Center				
2008	Ha Seung-jin	Jeonju KCC Egis	Yonsei University					
2009	Park Sung-jin	Incheon Electroland Black Slammer	Chung-Ang University					
2010	Park Chan-hee	Anyang KT&G Kites	Kyung Hee University					
2011	Oh Se-keun*	Anyang KGC	Chung-Ang University					
Jan 2012 (Note: Prior to 2012, the draft took place in late January when college players conclude their academic year. However, it presented a problem as it meant that college players could only join their teams at the end of the professional regular season. In the year 2012, there were two drafts: one in February and one in October. Since 2013, the draft has taken place in October.)	Kim Si-rae	Ulsan Mobis Phoebus	Myongji University					
Oct 2012	Jang Jae-seok	Seoul SK Knights	Chung-Ang University	Renaissance Hotel, Seoul				
2013	Kim Jong-kyu	Changwon LG Sakers	Kyung Hee University	Jamsil Students' Gymnasium				
2014	Lee Seoung-hyun	Goyang Orion Orions	Korea University	Jamsil Students' Gymnasium	10.9	2.0	5.1	
2015	Moon Seong-gon	Anyang KGC	Korea University	Jamsil Students' Gymnasium	1.7	0.3	1.0	
2016	Lee Jong-hyun	Ulsan Mobis Phoebus	Korea University	Jamsil Students' Gymnasium	10.5	2.2	8.0	
2017	Heo Hoon*	Busan KT Sonicboom	Yonsei University	Jamsil Students' Gymnasium	10.6	4.3	2.0	
2018	Park Jun-young	Busan KT Sonicboom	Korea University	Jamsil Students' Gymnasium	3.6	0.9	2.6	
2019	Park Jeong-hyun	Changwon LG Sakers	Korea University	Jamsil Students' Gymnasium	2.1	0.4	1.9	
2020	Cha Min-seok	Seoul Samsung Thunders	Jemulpo High School	Jamsil Students' Gymnasium	4.8	0.9	3.4	
2021	Lee Won-seok	Seoul Samsung Thunders	Yonsei University					
2022	Yang Jun-seok	Changwon LG Sakers	Yonsei University					
2023	Moon Jeong-hyeon	Suwon KT Sonicboom	Korea University					

== First overall picks by university ==
# of times	University	Years
9	Yonsei University	1999, 2003, 2005, 2006, 2007, 2008, 2017, 2021, 2022
7	Korea University	1998, 2000, 2014, 2015, 2016, 2018, 2019, 2023
4	Chung-Ang University	2001, 2002, 2009, 2012 (Note: October draft)
2	Kyung Hee University	2010, 2013
1	Hanyang University	2004
1	Myongji University	2012 (Note: January draft)

== History ==
The KBL rookie draft initially took place in January or February as it was the end of the academic year and all draft prospects were college seniors. An issue which arose from the timing of the draft was that rookies only joined their teams towards the end of the KBL season, which runs from October to March the following year. They had little time to gel with their new teammates or acclimatize to the professional game.

Beginning with 2012, the draft was scheduled in October or November, at the conclusion of the U-League season. Players from college teams will finish the season and declare eligibility for the upcoming draft before participating in the try-outs. They would generally join their new teams during the second round of the season. The timing of the draft day posed a "sink or swim" scenario for rookies as they had little time to familiarize themselves with their new teammates and coaches: rookies who are able to adapt to the professional league quickly enough are integrated into the main team by the end of the season while those unable to do so spend most of the season in the D-League (reserves).

The 2021 draft was moved back a month to September due to the abbreviated U-League season. The move was met with positive responses from players and teams as it allowed rookies to join pre-season training with their new teams.

Since the 2014 draft, there has been an increase in high school seniors and college freshmen, sophomores and juniors being picked earlier. Cha Min-seok was the first high school senior to be picked first overall. Yonsei University sophomore Lee Won-seok, first overall pick of the 2021 draft, was the first to have not been a college senior.

== Notable drafts ==
Korean-language basketball magazine Rookie and newspaper Sports Dong-a have both retrospectively dubbed the 2007 draft as the "Golden Draft". Compared to past and present draft classes, as of the 2020–21 season, more players from this draft have won the KBL Championship and continued to play regularly in their respective teams into their mid-thirties. The draft produced two KBL Most Valuable Player Award winners, statistical leaders and several "one club men" who spent entire decade-long careers with their original teams.

Other notable draft years include 2008, 2011 and 2014. Although not on the level of the 2007, the aforementioned drafts are viewed as "high-level" due to the larger numbers of first round draftees who have gone on to establish themselves as first-option players for their respective teams, won individual awards and called-up to the national team for international tournaments.

The 2017 draft was initially derided as a "worst ever" draft as only several players stood out from their performances in the U-League. It has since been retrospectively re-evaluated as a "high-level" draft as half of the first round picks have gone on to establish themselves in their teams and been selected for the national team.

== See also ==
- Draft (sports)
