= List of South Korean basketball players =

This is a list of South Korean basketball players.

== Women ==
=== B ===
- Beon Yeon-ha

=== C ===
- Cho Hey-jin
- Choi Aei-young
- Choi Kyung-hee
- Choi Youn-ah
- Chun Joo-weon
- Chung Eun-soon

=== H ===
- Hong Hyun-hee
- Hur Yoon-ja

=== J ===
- Jang Sun-hyoung
- Jeong Myung-hee
- Jin Mi-jung
- Jung Mi-ran
- Jung Sun-min

=== K ===
- Kang Ji-sook
- Kim Dan-bi
- Kim Eun-sook (basketball)
- Kim Hwa-soon
- Kim Ji-yoon
- Kim Kwe-ryong
- Kim Yeong-ok
- Kim Young-hee (basketball)

=== L ===
- Lee Eun-ju (basketball)
- Lee Hyung-sook
- Lee Jong-ae
- Lee Mi-ja (basketball)
- Lee Mi-sun

=== M ===
- Moon Kyung-ja

=== P ===
- Park Chan-sook
- Park Jung-eun
- Park Yang-gae

=== S ===
- Sin Jung-ja
- Sung Jung-a

=== U ===
- Sonia Ursu-Kim

=== W ===
- Wang Su-jin

=== Y ===
- Yang Jung-ok

== Men ==
=== C ===
- Cho Dong-kee
- Cho Sang-hyun
- Cho Sung-min (basketball)
- Choi Jin-soo
- Choi Jun-yong (basketball)
- Chun Hee-chul

=== H ===
- Ha Seung-jin
- Heo Il-young
- Heo Ung
- Hur Jae
- Hyun Joo-yup
- Heo Hoon

=== J ===
- Jeon Jun-beom
- Joo Hee-jung

=== K ===
- Kim Hyun-jun
- Kim Jiwan
- Kim Jong-kyu
- Kim Joo-sung (basketball)
- Kim Min-goo (basketball)
- Kim Seung-hyun (basketball)
- Kim Sun-hyung
- Kim Tae-sul
- Kim Yoo-taek
- Kim Si-rae

=== L ===
- Lee Seung-hyun (basketball)
- Lee Chung-hee (basketball)
- Lee Jong-hyun (basketball)
- Lee Jung-hyun (basketball, born 1987)
- Lee Jung-suk
- Lee Kyu-sup
- Lee Sang-min (basketball)
- Lee Seung-jun (basketball)
- Lee Won-woo
- Lim Dong-seob

=== M ===
- Moon Kyung-eun
- Moon Tae-jong
- Min Makeu

=== O ===
- Oh Se-keun

=== P ===
- Park Chan-hee (basketball)

=== S ===
- Seo Jang-hoon
- Shin Dong-pa

=== W ===
- Woo Ji-won

=== Y ===
- Yang Dong-geun (basketball)
- Yang Hee-jong
- Yang Hong-seok
- Yoo Jae-hak
