= List of Korean Basketball League annual statistical leaders =

Every year, the Korean Basketball League (KBL) awards titles to various leaders in the five basketball statistical categories—points, rebounds, assists, steals, and blocked shots. It subdivides the categories for scoring and rebounding into "overall", which includes both domestic and foreign players, and "domestic". (Note: "Domestic players" refers to players who entered the KBL as South Korean citizens as defined by FIBA nationality rules. Ricardo Ratliffe (Ra Gun-ah) is still classified under "foreign players" since he entered the league as a foreign national and acquired South Korean citizenship much later. Moon Tae-young, Lee Seung-jun and Chon Tae-poong entered the league via the ethnic draft, qualifying through a Korean parent, and are classified "domestic players".)

Previously an award was given to the domestic players who ranked first in the scoring and rebounding categories but was scrapped after the 2003–04 season. The KBL continues to publish the statistics on its website.

== List of statistics leaders ==
^	Denotes player who is still active in the KBL
*	Voted into the KBL All-Time Legend 12
Player (X)	Denotes the number of times the player had been the leader in the particular category up to and including that season

Season	Scoring (O)	Scoring (D)	Rebounding (O)	Rebounding (D)	Assists	Steals	Blocks	3P%	FT%
1997 (Note: The inaugural KBL season began play in February 1997 to facilitate a smooth transition from the amateur era. The 1997–98 season was the first full season of the new professional league.)	Calray Harris	Chun Hee-chul*	Jason Williford	Chun Hee-chul*	Kang Dong-hee	Michael Elliott	Jason Williford	Jason Williford	Jung Jae-kun
1997–98	Larry Davis	Moon Kyung-eun*	Keenan Jourdon	Park Jae-heon	Kang Dong-hee (2)	Joo Hee-jung*	Alex Sturm	Park Kyu-hyun	Kim Sang-shik
1998–99	Bernard Blunt	Seo Jang-hoon*	Seo Jang-hoon*	Seo Jang-hoon*	Lee Sang-min*	Gerald Walker	Jackie Jones	Shin Ki-sung	Kim Young-man
1999–00	Eric Ebertz	Seo Jang-hoon* (2)	Johnny McDowell*	Seo Jang-hoon* (2)	Kang Dong-hee (3)	Shin Ki-sung		Shin Ki-sung (2)	Choo Seung-gyun*
2000–01	Dennis Edwards	Cho Sung-won	Jackie Jones	Lee Eun-ho	Kang Dong-hee (4)	Lee Sang-min*	Jackie Jones (2)	Eric Ebertz	Cho Sung-won
2001–02	Eric Ebertz (2)	Seo Jang-hoon* (3)	Ryan Perryman	Seo Jang-hoon* (3)	Kim Seung-hyun	Kim Seung-hyun	Marcus Hicks	Kim Sung-chul	Choo Seung-gyun* (2)
2002–03	Leon Trimmingham	Seo Jang-hoon* (4)	Ryan Perryman (2)	Seo Jang-hoon* (4)	Hwang Sung-in	Hwang Sung-in	Marcus Hicks (2)	David Jackson	Moon Kyung-eun*
2003–04	Charles Minlend	Seo Jang-hoon* (5)	Ryan Perryman (3)	Kim Joo-sung*	Kim Seung-hyun (2)	Kim Seung-hyun (2)	Kim Joo-sung*	Park Jae-il	Choo Seung-gyun* (3)
2004–05	Nate Johnson	Seo Jang-hoon* (6)	Aaron McGhee	Seo Jang-hoon* (5)	Kim Seung-hyun (3)	Kim Seung-hyun (3)	Kris Lang	Shin Ki-sung (3)	Choo Seung-gyun* (4)
2005–06	Dontae' Jones	Seo Jang-hoon* (7)	Nigel Dixon	Kim Joo-sung* (2)	Kim Seung-hyun (4)	Chris Williams	Sharone Wright	Woo Ji-won	Choo Seung-gyun* (5)
2006–07	Pete Mickeal	Bang Sung-yoon	Olumide Oyedeji	Joo Hee-jung*	Joo Hee-jung*	Kim Seung-hyun (4)	Jameel Watkins	Shin Ki-sung (4)	Kim Seung-hyun
2007–08	Terrence Shannon Sr. (Note: Sr. was added as he is the father of basketball player Terrence Shannon Jr.)	Bang Sung-yoon (2)	Terrence Leather	Seo Jang-hoon* (6)	Joo Hee-jung* (2)	Park Ji-hyun	Kim Joo-sung* (2)	Carlos Dixon	Choo Seung-gyun* (6)
2008–09	Terrence Leather	Seo Jang-hoon* (8)	Terrence Leather (2)	Ha Seung-jin	Joo Hee-jung* (3)	Joo Hee-jung* (2)	Bryant Dunston	Son Kyu-wan	Moon Kyung-eun* (2)
2009–10	Moon Tae-young	Moon Tae-young	Chris Williams	Ha Seung-jin (2)	Joo Hee-jung* (4)	Yang Dong-geun*	Bryant Dunston (2)	Park Jong-chun	Marquin Chandler
2010–11	Aaron Haynes*	Moon Tae-young (2)	Chris Williams (2)	Ha Seung-jin (3)	Yang Dong-geun*	Park Chan-hee^	Herbert Hill	Lee Jung-suk	Cho Sung-min
2011–12	Aaron Haynes* (2)	Moon Tae-young (3)	Alexander Johnson	Ha Seung-jin (4)	Chris Williams	Chris Williams (2)	Charles Rhodes	Kim Tae-sul	Cho Sung-min (2)
2012–13	Jasper Johnson	Moon Tae-young (4)	Leon Williams^	Lee Seung-jun	Chon Tae-poong	Shin Myung-ho	Darian Townes	Cho Sung-min	Cho Sung-min (3)
2013–14	Tyler Wilkerson	Cho Sung-min	Sean Evans	Kim Joo-sung* (3)	Kim Tae-sul	Kim Min-goo	Herbert Hill (2)	Cho Sung-min (2)	Cho Sung-min (4)
2014–15	Davon Jefferson	Moon Tae-young (5)	Ricardo Ratliffe^	Ha Seung-jin (5)	Lee Hyun-min^	Yang Dong-geun* (2)	Charles Rhodes (2)	Heo Il-young^	Lee Jae-do^
2015–16	Troy Gillenwater	Moon Tae-young (6)	Ricardo Ratliffe^ (2)	Ha Seung-jin (6)	Yang Dong-geun* (2)	Lee Jung-hyun^	David Simon	Kim Sun-hyung^	Heo Ung^
2016–17	Aaron Haynes* (3)	Lee Jung-hyun^	Rod Benson	Oh Se-keun^	Park Chan-hee^	Nate Miller	David Simon (2)	Kim Ji-hoo^	Jung Young-sam
2017–18	David Simon	Oh Se-keun^	Ricardo Ratliffe^ (3)	Oh Se-keun^ (2)	Kim Si-rae^	Brandon Brown	David Simon (3)	Cha Ba-wee^	Reyshawn Terry
2018–19	James Mays	Lee Jung-hyun^ (2)	James Mays	Kim Jong-kyu^	Park Chan-hee^ (2)	Brandon Brown (2)	Ra Gun-ah^	Yang Dong-geun*	Lee Gwan-hee^
2019–20 (Note: Only 43 games were played instead of the usual 54 due to the COVID-19 pandemic.)	Cady Lalanne	Song Kyo-chang^	Ra Gun-ah^ (4)	Kim Jong-kyu^ (2)	Heo Hoon^	Moon Seong-gon^	Chinanu Onuaku	Cady Lalanne	Kim Si-rae^
2020–21	Shawn Long	Heo Hoon^	Shawn Long	Yang Hong-seok^	Heo Hoon^ (2)	Lee Dae-sung^	Isaiah Hicks^	Kim Dong-wook^	Nick Minnerath
2021–22	Jameel Warney^	Lee Dae-sung^	Assem Marei^	Yang Hong-seok^ (2)	Kim Si-rae^ (2)	Murphy Holloway^	Cady Lalanne	Yang Hong-seok^	Lee Gwan-hee^ (2)
2022–23	Jameel Warney^ (2)	Lee Dae-sung^ (2)	Assem Marei^ (2)	Oh Se-keun^ (3)	Kim Sun-hyung^	Assem Marei^	Omari Spellman	Shin Dong-hyuk^	Lee Dae-sung^
2023–24	Paris Bass	Lee Jung-hyun	Assem Marei^ (3)	Ha Yoon-gi^	Lee Jung-hyun	Lee Jung-hyun	Du'Vaughn Maxwell	Yoo Ki-sang^	Choi Sung-won^
2024–25	Jameel Warney^ (3)	Lee Jung-hyun (2)	Assem Marei^ (4)	Kang Sang-jae^	Heo Hoon^ (3)	Assem Marei^ (2)	Cady Lalanne (2)	Lee Geun-hwi^	Lee Jung-hyun
2025–26	Jameel Warney^ (4)	Lee Jung-hyun (3)	Assem Marei^ (5)	Lee Seoung-hyun^	Heo Hoon^ (4)	Assem Marei^ (3)	Jameel Warney	Jung In-Duk^	Kevin Quiambao

== 170 Club and 180 Club ==
In the KBL, both terms are used to describe players as excellent shooters, similar to the "50–40–90 club" used in the NBA. The "170 Club" requires a player to achieve the criteria of 50% field goal percentage, 40% three-point field goal percentage and 80% free throw percentage over the course of a regular season, while meeting the minimum thresholds to qualify as a league leader in each category.

To be described as part of the "180 Club", a player's free throw percentage must be at least 90%. In the history of the KBL, only two players have made the "180 Club", Choo Seung-gyun and Cho Sung-min. Cho was only 0.58% away from setting a new record, the "190 Club".

== Players with most top-scorer awards ==
Player	Awards	Years
(South Korea) Seo Jang-hoon	8	1999, 2000, 2002-2006, 2009
(South Korea) Moon Tae-young	6	2010-2013, 2015, 2016
(United States) Jameel Warney	4	2021, 2022, 2025, 2026
(South Korea) Lee Jung-hyun	2	2017, 2019
(South Korea) Lee Jung-hyun	2	2024, 2025
(South Korea) Lee Dae-sung	2	2022, 2023
