= Choo Seung-gyun =

South Korean basketball player

Personal information
- Born: December 6, 1974 (age 51) Busan, South Korea
- Listed height: 190 cm (6 ft 3 in)

Career information
- College: Hanyang University
- Playing career: 1997–2012
- Position: Small forward
- Coaching career: 2012–2018

Career history

Playing
- 1997–2012: Daejeon Hyundai Dynat / Hyundai Gullivers / Jeonju KCC Egis

Coaching
- 2012–2018: Jeonju KCC Egis (assistant coach / head coach)

Career highlights
- As player: 5× KBL Championship (1998, 1999, 2004, 2009, 2011); 3× KBL regular season champion (1998, 1999, 2000); KBL Best 5 (2009); KBL Playoffs MVP (2009); 2× KBL Defensive Player of the Year (1999, 2005); KBL Fair Play Award (2001); KBL All-Time Legend 12; Jeonju KCC Egis number 4 retired; As coach: KBL regular season champion (2016)

- Choo Seung-gyun
- Hangul: 추승균
- Hanja: 秋昇均
- RR: Chu Seunggyun
- MR: Ch'u Sŭnggyun

Choo Seung-gyun (born December 6, 1974) is a South Korean retired professional basketball player and coach. He spent his entire 15-year playing career with Korean Basketball League team Jeonju KCC Egis, who retired his number 4 jersey. After a brief stint in coaching, he became a SPOTV commentator and covers KBL matches.

== Early life ==
Choo is a native of Busan. Unlike many of his illustrious contemporaries, he did not attend a notable basketball high school in Seoul, nor did he come from a college basketball powerhouse such as Yonsei or Korea University. He attended Jungang High School in Busan and moved to Seoul where he played for Hanyang University.

== Playing career ==
=== College ===
As one of the region's biggest prospects, Choo was widely expected to attend Yonsei University or Korea University and raised eyebrows by choosing Hanyang University instead. In a 2012 interview, he stated that the decision was due to his desire to play more regularly and that neither Yonsei nor Korea University could guarantee him playing time as a freshman. In the 1997 National Basketball Festival, he went on to become the competition's top scorer, beating the likes of Seo Jang-hoon (Yonsei) and Hyun Joo-yup (Korea). At that time, the duopoly of Yonsei University and Korea University was dominating college competitions and, partly due to Hanyang's poor results, Choo was often overshadowed by the likes of Seo, Hyun, Woo Ji-won, Shin Ki-sung and Chun Hee-chul.

=== Professional ===
Choo's career coincided with the founding of the professional Korean Basketball League in 1997. He was signed by Daejeon Hyundai Dynat, which was later taken over by affiliate KCC Corporation and is now Jeonju KCC Egis. During Hyundai's early years, Choo was best known as part of the "Lee-Cho-Choo" trio alongside point guard Lee Sang-min and swingman forward Cho Sung-won which spearheaded the team's domination of the league during its early years. Choo, being the tallest of the threesome, was often tasked with defensive duties and also provided an added option around the paint due to his accurate shooting.

Although Choo was largely overshadowed by his more flamboyant teammates, he gained a reputation for his cool and calm demeanor during high-pressure and clutch situations, which is reflected in the fact that he was the league's free throw percentage leader for a record six seasons. He made the "180 Club", having achieved a 52.4% field goal percentage, 41.3% three-point field goal percentage and 90% free throw percentage during the 2004–05 season. His unflashy yet consistent playing style and clean private life earned him the sobriquet "Silent Strong Man" (소리없이 강한 남자), a contrast to colorful nicknames assigned to his contemporaries such as "Rambo Shooter" (Moon Kyung-eun), "Bullet Man" (Shin Ki-sung), "Airborne" (Chun Hee-chul) and "Magic Hippo" (Hyun Joo-yup). He was highly-regarded even by fans of opposing teams; when he scored against Seoul SK Knights in February 2012 to reach 10,000 career points, Knights fans gave him a standing ovation as a mark of respect.

Choo announced his retirement at the end of the 2011–12 season. His number 4 jersey was retired by the club. During his final season as a player, he became the second player in KBL history to reach the career benchmark of 10,000 points and made the playoffs for a record 13th time.

=== National team ===
Choo participated in the 1998 FIBA World Cup and the 1998 and 2002 Asian Games.

== Coaching career ==
After retiring as a player, Choo remained at Jeonju KCC Egis as a member of the coaching staff under Hur Jae, having previously played under him. He took over Hur as head coach in 2015. Choo's first season was a success as he led them to the play-off finals and first place in the league table. However, his next season was plagued by injury to key players and Jeonju KCC Egis finished at the bottom of the league. The 2018–19 season did not begin any better and he voluntarily resigned in November 2018, fourteen games into the season. At the time of his resignation, Jeonju KCC Egis was 7th in the league table.

== Other activities ==
Choo joined SPOTV as a commentator in January 2021. He mainly covers weekend KBL games.

Choo runs a YouTube channel called ChooSama TV (추사마 TV), "ChooSama" being the nickname given to him by fans during his playing days. He mainly discusses current events in the KBL, basketball tactics and players.

== Personal life ==
Choo married Lee Yoon-jung in 2004. The couple have two sons.

== See also ==
- List of Korean Basketball League annual statistical leaders
