= Korea University–Yonsei University rivalry =

Sports rivalry in Seoul, South Korea

- Native name: 고연전 or 연고전
- Other names: Tigers vs. Eagles
- Sports: Football; Basketball; Ice hockey; Rugby; Baseball
- Location: Seoul, South Korea
- Teams: Korea University; Yonsei University
- First meeting: 1925, as Bosung College (Korea) and Yonhi College (Yonsei)
- Latest meeting: Football Winner: Yonsei (2024) Basketball Winner: Yonsei (2024) Ice hockey Winner: Korea (2024) Rugby Winner: Cancelled (2024) Baseball Winner: Korea (2024)

The Korea–Yonsei rivalry (Korean: 고연전 or 연고전) is the college rivalry between two universities located in Seoul, South Korea, Korea University and Yonsei University. Located within the same city, the campuses are only thirty minutes apart. Korea University's symbol and mascot is the Tiger and Yonsei University's is the Eagle. Hence, match-ups between the two institutions are referred to as "Tigers vs. Eagles".

Since 1956, the annual Yonsei-Korea (Korea-Yonsei) games have served as the most hotly contested collegiate rivalries in the country. The teams meet each year in five main team sports: football, rugby, baseball, basketball, and ice hockey teams compete against each other. In addition to the annual "friendship games", both universities are members of the Korea University Sports Federation (KUSF) and also regularly compete against each other in the KUSF U-League in football, baseball, basketball and ice hockey.

Such is the importance of the match-ups to school spirit and student life that it garners extensive media coverage in the days leading up the games. Alumni, especially past and present professional athletes, are frequently featured or reference the rivalry in the media. A JoongAng Ilbo article in 1969 compared its historical significance to domestic student sport to that of The Boat Race contested by Oxford and Cambridge universities in the UK and Harvard and Yale's American football rivalry.

A long-running gag between the two universities is the order of the two universities when referring to the rivalry. Yonsei University refers to it as the "Yonsei-Korea" rivalry (연고전), whereas Korea University refers to it as the "Korea-Yonsei" rivalry (고연전). The order of which university is mentioned first in official reports depends on who is the designated away team for that year.

== History ==
In the 20th century, the Waseda–Keio rivalry (早慶戦, Sōkeisen) was the model for this match. The rivalry dates back to the Japanese Korea era when Yonsei University was Yonhi College and Korea University was Bosung College. The first sports played between the two institutions were tennis and football. The Joseon Athletic Association was forcibly shut down by the Japanese Imperialist government and match-ups between the two institutions became the main focus of domestic sports and occasionally an outlet of nationalistic fervor for ethnic Koreans in both Korea and Japan who were otherwise forbidden to speak their own language or maintain their distinct cultural identity. Football, basketball and ice hockey were the first sports played while rugby and baseball were added after independence. Both universities have since become known for its athletic traditions and produced numerous professional athletes.

== Sports ==
The two institutions regularly play against one another in the U-League in football, baseball, basketball and ice hockey and the rivalry translates to those games. The "friendship games" for all five sports is organized separately each fall semester (September or October) and held over two days, weather conditions permitting.

In 2014, Korea University recorded a clean sweep in all five sports. Three years later, Yonsei University achieved the same feat.

=== Football ===
The first football match was held at the Gyeongseong Stadium in 1927. From 1927 to 1942: Yonhi College (now Yonsei University) had 14 wins, and Bosung College (now Korea University) also had 14 wins. The All Joseon Football Championship was the predecessor of the National Football Championship.

Record

| Year | Winner | Korea | Yonsei | Trivia |
| 1965 | TIE | 1 | 1 | All five events (football, rugby, baseball, basketball, and ice hockey) were held for the first time. |
| 1966 | Yonsei | 0 | 2 | |
| 1967 | TIE | 0 | 0 | |
| 1968 | TIE | 0 | 0 | |
| 1969 | Yonsei | 0 | 1 | |
| 1970 | Korea | 3 | 0 | |
| 1971 | – | – | – | Aborted due to Hagwon incident. |
| 1972 | – | – | – | Aborted due to Hagwon incident. |
| 1973 | Korea | 2 | 1 | |
| 1974 | TIE | 1 | 1 | |
| 1975 | – | – | – | Aborted due to vehicle crash in Jinhae, South Korea. |
| 1976 | Korea | 1 | 0 | |
| 1977 | TIE | 0 | 0 | |
| 1978 | Yonsei | 0 | 1 | |
| 1979 | Yonsei | 1 | 3 | |
| 1980 | – | – | – | Aborted due to Hagwon incident. |
| 1981 | TIE | 0 | 0 | |
| 1982 | Korea | 1 | 0 | |
| 1983 | – | – | – | Aborted due to Hagwon incident. |
| 1984 | Yonsei | 1 | 2 | |
| 1985 | Korea | 4 | 0 | |
| 1986 | TIE | 0 | 0 | |
| 1987 | Yonsei | 2 | 3 | |
| 1988 | Yonsei | 0 | 3 | |
| 1989 | Korea | 5 | 2 | |
| 1990 | Korea | 3 | 2 | |
| 1991 | Korea | 3 | 1 | |
| 1992 | Korea | 1 | 0 | |
| 1993 | Korea | 1 | 0 | |
| 1994 | Korea | 3 | 1 | |
| 1995 | TIE | 2 | 2 | |
| 1996 | – | – | – | Aborted due to Hanchongryun (South Korean Federation of University Students Councils) incident. |
| 1997 | Yonsei | 1 | 2 | |
| 1998 | Yonsei | 0 | 2 | |
| 1999 | Yonsei | 1 | 2 | |
| 2000 | Korea | 2 | 0 | |
| 2001 | Yonsei | 0 | 1 | |
| 2002 | Korea | 4 | 0 | |
| 2003 | TIE | 0 | 0 | |
| 2004 | Korea | 2 | 0 | |
| 2005 | Yonsei | 0 | 2 | |
| 2006 | TIE | 1 | 1 | |
| 2007 | TIE | 0 | 0 | |
| 2008 | Yonsei | 0 | 1 | |
| 2009 | Korea | 2 | 1 | |
| 2010 | Korea | 3 | 0 | |
| 2011 | Korea | 3 | 1 | |
| 2012 | Korea | 1 | 0 | |
| 2013 | Yonsei | 2 | 3 | |
| 2014 | Korea | 2 | 0 | |
| 2015 | TIE | 1 | 1 | |
| 2016 | Korea | 3 | 1 | |
| 2017 | Yonsei | 1 | 2 | |
| 2018 | Yonsei | 1 | 2 | |
| 2019 | – | – | – | Aborted due to access of Typhoon Lingling (2019). |
| 2020 | – | – | – | Aborted due to COVID-19 pandemic in South Korea. |
| 2021 | – | – | – | Aborted due to COVID-19 pandemic in South Korea. |
| 2022 | Yonsei | 0 | 1 | |
| 2023 | Korea | 3 | 0 | |
| 2024 | Yonsei | 1 | 2 | |

=== Basketball ===
Basketball was added in 1930 and was the most popular summer sport along with football contested by the two institutions. Besides the "friendship games", the two teams participate in the Basketball U-League and the annual MBC Cup competition. Prior to the organization of the U-League and the establishment of the Korean Basketball League, both teams participated in the National Basketball Festival (농구대잔치) run by the Korean Basketball Association.

Record

| Year | Winner | Korea | Yonsei | Trivia |
| 1965 | Korea | 87 | 84 | All five events (football, rugby, baseball, basketball, and ice hockey) were held for the first time. |
| 1966 | Yonsei | 91 | 105 | |
| 1967 | Korea | 57 | 53 | |
| 1968 | Korea | 87 | 76 | |
| 1969 | TIE | 64 | 64 | |
| 1970 | Yonsei | 71 | 79 | |
| 1971 | – | – | – | Aborted due to Hagwon incident. |
| 1972 | – | – | – | Aborted due to Hagwon incident. |
| 1973 | Yonsei | 62 | 64 | |
| 1974 | Korea | 87 | 83 | |
| 1975 | – | – | – | Aborted due to vehicle crash in Jinhae, South Korea. |
| 1976 | Yonsei | 67 | 90 | |
| 1977 | TIE | 86 | 86 | |
| 1978 | Yonsei | 70 | 72 | |
| 1979 | TIE | 80 | 80 | |
| 1980 | – | – | – | Aborted due to Hagwon incident. |
| 1981 | Korea | 77 | 76 | |
| 1982 | Yonsei | 80 | 81 | |
| 1983 | – | – | – | Aborted due to Hagwon incident. |
| 1984 | Korea | 57 | 51 | |
| 1985 | Yonsei | 61 | 65 | |
| 1986 | TIE | 25 | 21 | TIE because of slippery coat that due to milk and bread which Two schools students threw |
| 1987 | Korea | 67 | 64 | |
| 1988 | Yonsei | 57 | 69 | |
| 1989 | Yonsei | 69 | 78 | |
| 1990 | Yonsei | 57 | 74 | |
| 1991 | Yonsei | 57 | 69 | |
| 1992 | Yonsei | 65 | 67 | |
| 1993 | Yonsei | 60 | 71 | |
| 1994 | Korea | 73 | 59 | |
| 1995 | Korea | 92 | 87 | |
| 1996 | – | – | – | Aborted due to Hanchongryun (South Korean Federation of University Students Councils) incident. |
| 1997 | Yonsei | 62 | 68 | |
| 1998 | Korea | 61 | 58 | |
| 1999 | Yonsei | 69 | 72 | |
| 2000 | Korea | 61 | 54 | |
| 2001 | Korea | 98 | 84 | |
| 2002 | Yonsei | 73 | 75 | |
| 2003 | Yonsei | 65 | 88 | |
| 2004 | Yonsei | 74 | 88 | |
| 2005 | Korea | 76 | 65 | |
| 2006 | Korea | 73 | 65 | |
| 2007 | Korea | 90 | 75 | |
| 2008 | Korea | 74 | 72 | |
| 2009 | Yonsei | 58 | 74 | |
| 2010 | Yonsei | 65 | 74 | |
| 2011 | Korea | 67 | 63 | |
| 2012 | Korea | 74 | 60 | |
| 2013 | Korea | 75 | 62 | |
| 2014 | Korea | 61 | 58 | |
| 2015 | Korea | 85 | 74 | |
| 2016 | TIE | 71 | 71 | |
| 2017 | Yonsei | 73 | 83 | |
| 2018 | Yonsei | 69 | 72 | |
| 2019 | Korea | 82 | 71 | |
| 2020 | – | – | – | Aborted due to COVID-19 pandemic in South Korea. |
| 2021 | – | – | – | Aborted due to COVID-19 pandemic in South Korea. |
| 2022 | Korea | 72 | 64 | |
| 2023 | Korea | 64 | 60 | |
| 2024 | Yonsei | 54 | 57 | |

=== Ice hockey ===
Ice hockey was added in winter 1940. The sport was introduced to the country in 1928 but did not gain much popularity outside of the Korea University–Yonsei University rivalry matches until the 2018 Winter Olympics. As two of the few universities in the country which sponsor ice hockey, they also play against each other in the U-League.

In October 2014, Korea University won 3–2, its first win over Yonsei since 1997.

Record

| Year | Winner | Korea | Yonsei | Trivia |
| 1965 | TIE | 4 | 4 | All five events (football, rugby, baseball, basketball, and ice hockey) were held for the first time. |
| 1966 | TIE | 6 | 6 | |
| 1967 | Korea | 6 | 2 | |
| 1968 | Korea | 7 | 5 | |
| 1969 | Korea | 6 | 5 | |
| 1970 | Korea | 9 | 4 | |
| 1971 | – | – | – | Aborted due to Hagwon incident. |
| 1972 | – | – | – | Aborted due to Hagwon incident. |
| 1973 | Korea | 4 | 3 | |
| 1974 | Korea | 5 | 3 | |
| 1975 | – | – | – | Aborted due to vehicle crash in Jinhae, South Korea. |
| 1976 | Yonsei | 3 | 9 | |
| 1977 | Korea | 4 | 3 | |
| 1978 | Korea | 4 | 2 | |
| 1979 | Yonsei | 3 | 4 | |
| 1980 | – | – | – | Aborted due to Hagwon incident. |
| 1981 | Yonsei | 5 | 6 | |
| 1982 | Korea | 6 | 3 | |
| 1983 | – | – | – | Aborted due to Hagwon incident. |
| 1984 | Yonsei | 3 | 7 | |
| 1985 | Yonsei | 2 | 11 | |
| 1986 | Yonsei | 4 | 6 | |
| 1987 | Korea | 5 | 4 | |
| 1988 | Korea | 5 | 3 | |
| 1989 | Korea | 8 | 5 | |
| 1990 | TIE | 2 | 2 | |
| 1991 | Yonsei | 2 | 4 | |
| 1992 | Yonsei | 3 | 8 | |
| 1993 | Yonsei | 3 | 4 | |
| 1994 | Yonsei | 3 | 5 | |
| 1995 | Korea | 5 | 3 | |
| 1996 | – | – | – | Aborted due to Hanchongryun (South Korean Federation of University Students Councils) incident. |
| 1997 | Korea | 5 | 4 | |
| 1998 | Yonsei | 3 | 6 | |
| 1999 | Yonsei | 3 | 4 | |
| 2000 | Yonsei | 2 | 3 | |
| 2001 | TIE | 3 | 3 | |
| 2002 | TIE | 3 | 3 | |
| 2003 | Yonsei | 2 | 3 | |
| 2004 | Yonsei | 3 | 5 | |
| 2005 | Yonsei | 1 | 3 | |
| 2006 | Yonsei | 2 | 3 | |
| 2007 | – | – | Aborted due to conflict about appointment refereeing | |
| 2008 | TIE | 1 | 1 | |
| 2009 | Yonsei | 2 | 4 | |
| 2010 | Yonsei | 1 | 8 | |
| 2011 | TIE | 1 | 1 | |
| 2012 | Yonsei | 1 | 3 | |
| 2013 | TIE | 2 | 2 | |
| 2014 | Korea | 5 | 4 | |
| 2015 | Yonsei | 3 | 4 | |
| 2016 | TIE | 3 | 3 | |
| 2017 | Yonsei | 1 | 5 | |
| 2018 | Korea | 2 | 1 | |
| 2019 | Yonsei | 1 | 4 | |
| 2020 | – | – | – | Aborted due to COVID-19 pandemic in South Korea. |
| 2021 | – | – | – | Aborted due to COVID-19 pandemic in South Korea. |
| 2022 | Korea | 4 | 1 | |
| 2023 | Yonsei | 1 | 4 | |
| 2024 | Korea | 4 | 3 | |

=== Rugby ===
Record

| Year | Winner | Korea | Yonsei | Trivia |
| 1965 | Yonsei | 3 | 11 | All five events (football, rugby, baseball, basketball, and ice hockey) were held for the first time. |
| 1966 | Korea | 3 | 0 | |
| 1967 | Korea | 5 | 3 | |
| 1968 | Korea | 16 | 6 | |
| 1969 | Yonsei | 3 | 5 | |
| 1970 | Yonsei | 6 | 8 | |
| 1971 | – | – | – | Aborted due to Hagwon incident. |
| 1972 | – | – | – | Aborted due to Hagwon incident. |
| 1973 | Korea | 13 | 3 | |
| 1974 | Korea | 16 | 12 | |
| 1975 | – | – | – | Aborted due to vehicle crash in Jinhae, South Korea. |
| 1976 | TIE | 3 | 3 | |
| 1977 | Yonsei | 7 | 8 | |
| 1978 | Korea | 10 | 4 | |
| 1979 | Korea | 39 | 16 | |
| 1980 | – | – | – | Aborted due to Hagwon incident. |
| 1981 | Yonsei | 12 | 14 | |
| 1982 | Yonsei | 16 | 21 | |
| 1983 | – | – | – | Aborted due to Hagwon incident. |
| 1984 | Yonsei | 12 | 22 | |
| 1985 | Yonsei | 0 | 19 | |
| 1986 | Yonsei | 0 | 3 | |
| 1987 | Yonsei | 3 | 25 | |
| 1988 | Yonsei | 10 | 16 | |
| 1989 | Korea | 21 | 18 | |
| 1990 | Korea | 21 | 7 | |
| 1991 | Yonsei | 12 | 21 | |
| 1992 | Korea | 17 | 11 | |
| 1993 | Korea | 3 | 2 | |
| 1994 | TLE | 10 | 10 | |
| 1995 | Korea | 15 | 13 | |
| 1996 | – | – | – | Aborted due to Hanchongryun (South Korean Federation of University Students Councils) incident. |
| 1997 | Yonsei | 9 | 18 | |
| 1998 | Yonsei | 23 | 27 | |
| 1999 | – | – | – | Aborted due to protection ground for football elimination round of 2000 Summer Olympics. |
| 2000 | Yonsei | 10 | 22 | |
| 2001 | Yonsei | 20 | 26 | |
| 2002 | Korea | 30 | 24 | |
| 2003 | Korea | 19 | 18 | |
| 2004 | Korea | 16 | 13 | |
| 2005 | Yonsei | 14 | 21 | |
| 2006 | Korea | 27 | 3 | |
| 2007 | Korea | 30 | 32 | |
| 2008 | Yonsei | 21 | 17 | |
| 2009 | Korea | 5 | 4 | |
| 2010 | Yonsei | 20 | 38 | |
| 2011 | Korea | 8 | 5 | |
| 2012 | Yonsei | 13 | 15 | |
| 2013 | Korea | 20 | 17 | |
| 2014 | Korea | 33 | 23 | |
| 2015 | Yonsei | 21 | 24 | |
| 2016 | Yonsei | 26 | 27 | |
| 2017 | Yonsei | 21 | 26 | |
| 2018 | Yonsei | 15 | 31 | |
| 2019 | – | – | – | Aborted due to access of Typhoon Lingling (2019). |
| 2020 | – | – | – | Aborted due to COVID-19 pandemic in South Korea. |
| 2021 | – | – | – | Aborted due to COVID-19 pandemic in South Korea. |
| 2022 | Korea | 57 | 24 | |
| 2023 | Korea | 41 | 27 | |
| 2024 | – | – | – | Aborted due to player's death. |

=== Baseball ===
Baseball was added after liberation. The two teams play in the Jamsil Baseball Stadium or Mokdong Baseball Stadium.

Record

| Year | Winner | Korea | Yonsei | Trivia |
| 1965 | Yonsei | 2 | 3 | All five events (football, rugby, baseball, basketball, and ice hockey) were held for the first time. |
| 1966 | Korea | 2 | 0 | |
| 1967 | Korea | 5 | 0 | |
| 1968 | Korea | 4 | 3 | |
| 1969 | Korea | 4 | 3 | |
| 1970 | TIE | 1 | 1 | |
| 1971 | – | – | – | Aborted due to Hagwon incident. |
| 1972 | – | – | – | Aborted due to Hagwon incident. |
| 1973 | Korea | 6 | 4 | |
| 1974 | Korea | 6 | 5 | |
| 1975 | – | – | – | Aborted due to vehicle crash in Jinhae, South Korea. |
| 1976 | TIE | 3 | 3 | |
| 1977 | Yonsei | 2 | 6 | |
| 1978 | Yonsei | 1 | 2 | |
| 1979 | Korea | 4 | 1 | |
| 1980 | – | – | – | Aborted due to Hagwon incident. |
| 1981 | Yonsei | 0 | 3 | |
| 1982 | Korea | 3 | 0 | |
| 1983 | – | – | – | Aborted due to Hagwon incident. |
| 1984 | Korea | 6 | 0 | |
| 1985 | Yonsei | 1 | 5 | |
| 1986 | Korea | 4 | 2 | |
| 1987 | Korea | 11 | 0 | |
| 1988 | Yonsei | 3 | 4 | |
| 1989 | Yonsei | 1 | 2 | |
| 1990 | Korea | 3 | 2 | |
| 1991 | Yonsei | 1 | 4 | |
| 1992 | Korea | 3 | 1 | |
| 1993 | Korea | 3 | 2 | |
| 1994 | Korea | 7 | 0 | |
| 1995 | Yonsei | 5 | 9 | |
| 1996 | – | – | – | Aborted due to Hanchongryun (South Korean Federation of University Students Councils) incident. |
| 1997 | TIE | 1 | 1 | Declaring No game at the top of the 2nd inning. |
| 1998 | Korea | 6 | 2 | |
| 1999 | TIE | 3 | 3 | Declaring raining called game at half of the 7th inning. |
| 2000 | TIE | 1 | 1 | |
| 2001 | Yonsei | 2 | 9 | |
| 2002 | Korea | 8 | 3 | |
| 2003 | Korea | 3 | 2 | |
| 2004 | Korea | 2 | 1 | |
| 2005 | Yonsei | 0 | 3 | |
| 2006 | Yonsei | 1 | 6 | |
| 2007 | Korea | 5 | 2 | |
| 2008 | Yonsei | 2 | 9 | |
| 2009 | Korea | 5 | 4 | |
| 2010 | TIE | 4 | 4 | |
| 2011 | Yonsei | 1 | 3 | |
| 2012 | Korea | 3 | 1 | |
| 2013 | Yonsei | 1 | 3 | |
| 2014 | Korea | 6 | 3 | |
| 2015 | Korea | 7 | 5 | |
| 2016 | Korea | 4 | 3 | |
| 2017 | Yonsei | 4 | 5 | |
| 2018 | TIE | – | – | Aborted due to access of Typhoon Kong-rey (2018). |
| 2019 | Yonsei | 3 | 6 | |
| 2020 | – | – | – | Aborted due to COVID-19 pandemic in South Korea. |
| 2021 | – | – | – | Aborted due to COVID-19 pandemic in South Korea. |
| 2022 | Yonsei | 2 | 8 | |
| 2023 | Yonsei | 4 | 6 | |
| 2024 | Korea | 3 | 0 | |

== Culture ==
The "rivalry" lacks the heated animosity of the typical sports rivalry and is promoted by both institutions as a match-up between friendly rival universities. Each year, various celebratory festivals are held before and after the friendship games between the two institutions. Students also engage in community service projects together. As with most events in the country, the festivities were canceled or transferred online in light of the COVID-19 pandemic.

=== Cheer battle ===
One of the main spectacles of the "friendship games" is the cheer battles between the students on both sides during each sporting event. Students dress in either blue (Yonsei) or red (Korea) and design their own banners to display at the respective venue to support their respective university. Both institutions are known for their distinctly unique chants: Yonsei University's chant is Akaraka (아카라카) and Korea University's chant is Ipselenti (입실렌티).

=== Train Game ===
After annual Yonsei-Korea (Korea-Yonsei) games, students from both schools engage in the "Train Game" (기차놀이). The game is performed in a manner similar to that of making a conga line, forming a line by holding a person in front of another by his/her shoulder. The Trains head to bars, stores, and restaurants to demand food and drinks for free. It is told to both Yonsei and Korea (Korea and Yonsei) students that the tradition originates from the 1980s when pro-democratic student demonstrations were prevalent. The shopkeepers nearby the campuses witnessed the events and sympathized with the cause, thus served food and drinks free of charge to the students.

The practice has drawn criticism, from both the community and students themselves from both universities, as being "outdated" due to inflation since the 2000s and the economic burden placed on shopkeepers and business owners in the vicinity. Complaints from local residents and business owners are mainly directed towards the rude and disruptive behavior of participating students.

== Ties with domestic professional sports ==
The long-standing athletic traditions of both universities has been tied with domestic professional sports, most notably in football and basketball. Criticism has been directed towards the duopoly of the two universities due to the perception that athletes, especially in domestic football, rely on their alma mater's reputation rather than skills to gain a spot in the national team or the institutions having an upper hand in recruiting the country's best talent.

=== Football ===
Notable alumni include former national team managers Cha Bum-kun, Huh Jung-moo, Cho Kwang-rae and Hong Myung-bo. Prior to the 2002 FIFA World Cup, the Korea Football Association (KFA) was dogged by accusations of selecting coaches and players of the national team based on hak-yeon (학연) – the Korean language equivalent term of "old boy network" – instead of performances during the season or individual merit. The likes of 2002 World Cup participants such as former national team captain Ahn Jung-hwan, defender Lee Young-pyo and midfielder Park Ji-sung, all of whom are alumni of other universities, finding success overseas prompted observers and fans to question the KFA's selection policy. The criticism came to a head after the failures of the 2018 FIFA World Cup and the KFA's repeated selection of several underperforming players over other better performing players after it emerged that then-KFA Vice President and chairman of the technical committee Kim Ho-kon and those selected players were all alumni of Yonsei University.

=== Basketball ===
While college basketball in South Korea does not enjoy the same popularity as the professional Korean Basketball League, both universities are well known for producing an illustrious line of professional basketball players, a majority of whom have represented the South Korean national team. The 1990s were often dubbed a "golden era" of domestic college basketball with the Korea-Yonsei rivalry at its peak and both teams boasted legends such as Lee Sang-min, Moon Kyung-eun, Woo Ji-won and Seo Jang-hoon (Yonsei University) and Hyun Joo-yup, Chun Hee-chul and Shin Ki-sung (Korea University), among others. Their popularity continued into their professional careers, making them some of the country's most recognizable athletes of their generation and being collectively dubbed "Oppa Troupe" (오빠부대) by the media as they enjoyed a level of popularity equivalent to that of idol singers. Up until the late 2000s, Chung-Ang University was its only major rival and the three institutions have occasionally been referred to as the "big 3" institutions of college basketball. In more recent years, the rise of Kyung Hee University has challenged the dominance of the three universities.

As of the 2024–25 KBL season, seven winners of the regular season KBL Most Valuable Player Award and the head coaches of five (out of ten) KBL teams are alumni of either university. The dominance of both Korea University and Yonsei University in the annual rookie draft has been broken to some extent by Chung-Ang, Kyung Hee and Hanyang University but its players continue to be selected within the first round or early in the second round, with fifteen being the overall first picks since the draft was first initiated (as of the 2021 rookie draft). As such, the rivalry is often humorously referenced by the media or players themselves, especially during a period of time when Shin was a SPOTV commentator while Lee, Moon and Hyun were head coaches of Seoul Samsung Thunders, Seoul SK Knights and Changwon LG Sakers respectively.

=== Olympians ===
Both Yonsei University and Korea University (Korea University and Yonsei University) send many athletes to the Olympic Games. Four-time gold medalist short track speed skater Chun Lee-Kyung and gymnast Son Yeon-jae are graduates of Yonsei University. Gold medalist figure skater Kim Yuna is a Korea University graduate.

== Geographic location ==
Korea University is located on the northeastern-side of Seoul, and Yonsei University is located on the west-side of Seoul.

== See also ==
- SKY (universities) – A grouping of the most prestigious universities in Seoul which includes these two universities along with Seoul National University.
- Waseda-Keio rivalry – College rivalry between Waseda University and Keio University, the two most prestigious private universities in Japan.
- Harvard-Yale rivalry
- College rivalry
