= Shin Ki-sung =

South Korean basketball player (born 1975)

Personal information
- Born: April 30, 1975 (age 51) South Korea
- Listed height: 180 cm (5 ft 11 in)

Career information
- College: Korea University
- KBL draft: 1998: 1st round, 7th overall pick
- Playing career: 1998–2012
- Position: Guard
- Coaching career: 2013–2019

Career history

Playing
- 1998–2005: Wonju Naray Blue Bird / TG Sambo Xers
- 2001–2003: → Sangmu (military service)
- 2005–2010: Busan KTF Magic Wings / KT Sonicboom
- 2010–2012: Incheon E-land Elephants

Coaching
- 2013–2014: Korea University
- 2014–2016: Bucheon KEB Hana Bank
- 2016–2019: Incheon Shinhan Bank S-Birds

Career highlights
- As player: KBL Championship (2005); KBL regular season champion (2004, 2005); KBL Rookie of the Year Award (1999); KBL Most Valuable Player Award (2005); KBL Best 5 (2005)

- Shin Ki-sung
- Hangul: 신기성
- Hanja: 申基成
- RR: Sin Giseong
- MR: Sin Kisŏng

Shin Ki-sung (born April 30, 1975) is a South Korean retired professional basketball player and former coach. He played for three different teams in the Korean Basketball League and the South Korean national team. Known for his speed and shooting accuracy, he was nicknamed "Bullet Man" (총알탄 사나이).

Since 2019, he has been a commentator for SPOTV and covers KBL games.

== Early years ==
Shin began playing basketball in elementary school. He attended Songdo High School in Incheon.

== Playing career ==
=== College ===
At Korea University, Shin was a member of the dominant "Tiger Corps" which included Hyun Joo-yup, Chun Hee-chul and future MVP Kim Byung-chul. When he and Hyun were freshmen, rivals Yonsei University were the dominant college team due to seniors Lee Sang-min and Moon Kyung-eun. After Lee and Moon both graduated, Shin and his Korea University teammates were able to win the MBC Cup three consecutive times as well as the National Basketball Festival tournament.

=== Professional ===
==== Wonju (1998–2005) ====
With Seo Jang-hoon and Hyun Joo-yup attracting the most attention during his college days, Shin's draft ranking was affected and he was picked seventh overall in the 1998 rookie draft. Other than Hyun, the first overall pick, the other players picked before Shin did not have lasting careers in the KBL, leading to Shin being described as the most underestimated player of the draft. He was selected by Wonju Naray Blue Bird and was joined by veteran guard Hur Jae, whom Naray had signed from Busan Kia Enterprise in a trade. Shin was supposed to enlist after the 1999–2000 season ended but delayed his enlistment as he had not reached the age limit yet. Hur was already in his thirties and split scoring duties with Shin and guard Kim Seung-gi (future Anyang KGC head coach).

In June 2001 he enlisted for mandatory military service, together with Hyun, and was assigned to the Sangmu team after completing basic training. They were discharged in 2003.

With the drafting of forward Kim Joo-sung, the newly renamed TG Xers became known as "Speed TG" due to Kim and Shin's scoring tandem and the team's fast-paced offensive strategy. They won the 2005 KBL Championship. During the play-offs, he recorded a double-double in both legs of the semi-final against Jeonju KCC Egis. Shin won the KBL Most Valuable Player Award, then the lowest-drafted player on record to win it.

==== Busan (2005–2010) ====
After contract negotiations broke down, Shin decided to leave Wonju and signed a five-year contract with Busan KTF Magic Wings. Hyun had just left KTF and the team was looking to rebuild. The following year, KTF drafted shooting guard Cho Sung-min and the duo led the team to the 2007 play-off finals, where they met regular season champions Ulsan Mobis Phoebus. Together with guard Kim Hee-seon, the trio won praise in Game 6 for shutting down Mobis' star guard Yang Dong-geun and limiting him to only 9 points. After winning three out of six games, KTF lost the seventh game.

With Cho enlisting at the end of the 2006–07 season, KTF were unable to replace him and other departing key players for the upcoming season. Meanwhile, Shin came under criticism for his poor form. KTF failed to qualify for the play-offs for the first time since the 2003–04 season. During his last season with the team, he captained them to a runner-up spot in the league table.

==== Incheon (2010–2012) ====
Shin joined Incheon Electro Land Elephants in 2010 on a two-year contract. Despite being one of the oldest players on the squad, he contributed to important games with "clutch points" by scoring during the fourth quarter. He retired at the end of the 2011–12 season.

=== National team ===
Shin was mostly overlooked due to the presence of Lee Sang-min and Kim Seung-hyun. He was named in the final squad for the 2002 Asian Games, 2005 FIBA Asia Championship and the 2007 FIBA Asia Championship.

== Post-playing career ==
Shin returned to his alma mater Korea University as head coach in 2013. He left after a season and joined the coaching staff of WKBL team Bucheon KEB Hana. He served as head coach of WKBL team Incheon Shinhan Bank S-Birds for three seasons, from 2016 to 2019.

Shin had been a guest commentator while he was still coaching. After leaving coaching permanently, he became a full-time commentator for SPOTV. He has also made guest appearances on various variety shows, mostly with other retired professional athletes and some of his former teammates.

== Personal life ==
Shin married his university girlfriend Park So-yoon, a dancer, in 2001.

== See also ==
- List of Korean Basketball League annual statistical leaders
