= Cho Sung-min (basketball) =

South Korean basketball player

Cho Sung-min 조성민
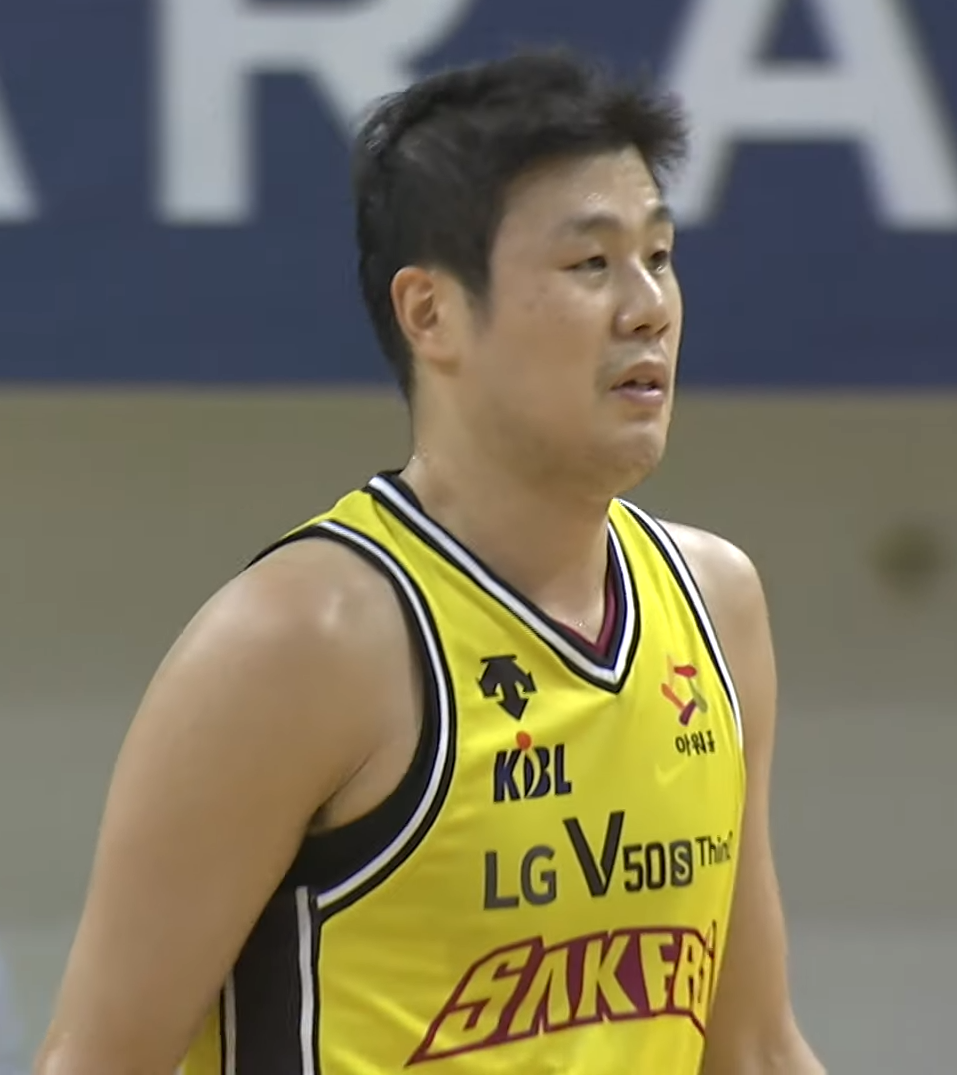
- Cho with the Changwon LG Sakers in 2020

Personal information
- Born: December 23, 1983 (age 42)
- Listed height: 6 ft 2 in (1.88 m)
- Listed weight: 200 lb (91 kg)

Career information
- High school: Jeonju
- College: Hanyang University
- Playing career: 2006–2021
- Position: Shooting guard

Career history
- 2006–2017: Busan KTF Magic Wings / KT Sonicboom
- 2007-2009: → Sangmu (loan)
- 2017–2021: Changwon LG Sakers

Career highlights
- KBL regular season champion (2011); 2x KBL Best 5 (2011, 2014); KBL Fair Play Award (2014)
Medals
Representing South Korea
Men's basketball
Asian Games
Silver medal – second place	2010 Guangzhou	Team
Gold medal – first place	2014 Incheon	Team
FIBA Asia Championship
Bronze medal – third place	2011 Wuhan	Team
Bronze medal – third place	2013 Manila	Team

- Korean name
- Hangul: 조성민
- Hanja: 趙成愍
- RR: Jo Seongmin
- MR: Cho Sŏngmin

Cho Sung-min (Korean: 조성민; born December 23, 1983) is a South Korean retired professional basketball player. He played for Busan KT Sonicboom and Changwon LG Sakers in the Korean Basketball League and was a member of the South Korean national team.

In his prime, Cho was considered one of the league's most accurate three-point and free throw shooters, earning the nickname "Chosun Shooter" (조선의 슈터). He was the free throw percentage leader for four consecutive seasons and is only second to Moon Kyung-eun in the all-time percentage record, successfully scoring 92.3% of his free throws during the 2011–12 season.

== Early life ==
The youngest of three children, Cho is a native of Jeonju. He became interested in basketball as an elementary school student due to the popularity of the basketball-themed manga and its animated adaptation Slam Dunk and the television series The Last Match. He attended Jeonju High School, where he first attracted the attention of scouts for his accurate shooting.

== College career ==
Cho went on to Hanyang University where he was a junior of future national teammate and best friend Yang Dong-geun. At that time Hanyang was mostly known for its baseball team and its basketball team was still not considered a major contender to the "big 3" universities of domestic college basketball: Yonsei University, Korea University and Chung-Ang University. His college career was mostly overshadowed by a star-studded Yonsei team which included Yang Hee-jong, Kim Tae-sul and future 2006 KBL draft first overall pick Jeon Jeong-gyu. He notably scored 32 points in the final of the National Basketball Championships (college division), one of the collegiate tournaments prior to the establishment of the U-League.

== Professional career ==
=== Busan KT Sonicboom (2006–2017) ===
Cho was drafted by Busan KTF Magic Wings in 2006 and was the eighth overall pick. Incidentally, Cho shared the same name as an older baseball player of the same name who had recently divorced popular actress Choi Jin-sil, leading the younger Cho to quip in an interview that he hoped to become famous enough to make the name "Cho Sung-min" associated with him and not his older fellow athlete. In his first full season, Cho and veteran point guard Shin Ki-sung formed the backbone of the KTF Magic Wings team which reached the play-off finals to face regular season champions Ulsan Mobis Phoebus, Yang Dong-geun's team. However, Cho had to be stretchered off during Game 6 after colliding with Yang and Shin dedicated the hard-fought win to him. KTF lost the seventh game and Mobis won the Championship.

Unlike many of his counterparts who generally enlisted for mandatory military service after two or three years, Cho decided to enlist in May 2007, at the end of his rookie season. He and Yang enlisted together and were assigned to the Sangmu team after completing basic training.

The 2013–14 season was a record-breaking one for Cho as he became the first guard to rank first in scoring among domestic players. Forwards, including swingmen doubling as shooting guards, and centers had traditionally dominated in the scoring category while scoring-oriented point guards were still relatively uncommon at that time. He also simultaneously ranked first in both the three-point field goal and free throw percentages for a second consecutive season. No other player has accomplished this feat ever since. KT Sonicboom, which had finished second last the previous season, managed to qualify for the play-offs.

=== Changwon LG Sakers (2017–2021) ===
In February 2017, it was announced that Cho would be traded to Changwon LG Sakers in exchange for its highest drawn pick of the upcoming rookie draft and forward Kim Young-hwan, who was on the last year of his contract. The move surprised observers and pundits as Cho was then KT Sonicboom's longest-serving player and considered to be the "face" of the franchise.

Cho retired at the end of the 2020–21 season. Due to COVID-19 restrictions, the club was unable to hold a full retirement ceremony for him. Instead, it was held prior to the first game of the 2021–22 season between his two former teams, LG and KT.

== National team career ==
After his good form during the 2013–14 season, Cho was chosen for the final squad to compete at the 2014 Asian Games, hosted on home soil. Cho stood out for his accuracy in games where the South Korean team was at a disadvantage in terms of height. He hit the game winner in against Iran putting South Korea on top, 79–77.

Cho was part of the final 12-man which competed in the 2014 FIBA Basketball World Cup. He averaged 6.2 points, 2.0 rebounds and 2.0 assists per game.

== Personal life ==
Cho lost both of his parents in September 2006 when they were involved in a car accident. He had been in the Los Angeles area for off-season training when they travelled there to visit him. His father's last words were not to tell him about the accident so that he could concentrate on preparing for the upcoming season. As a result, Cho did not attend the funeral and was only told about the accident after he returned to South Korea. When KT Sonicboom won the regular season title in 2011, he dedicated the win to his late parents.

In May 2012, Cho married his university girlfriend, flautist Yoon Sook-jeong. Yoon, a graduate of Seoul National University, is a former principal flautist of the Gyeongbuk Provincial Symphony Orchestra. The couple have a daughter (born in 2015).

== See also ==
- List of Korean Basketball League annual statistical leaders
