= Cho Sung-won =

South Korean basketball player

Personal information
- Born: August 24, 1971 (age 55) South Korea
- Listed height: 180 cm (5 ft 11 in)

Career information
- College: Myongji University
- Playing career: 1994–2006
- Position: Shooting guard / small forward
- Number: 10, 11
- Coaching career: 2006–present

Career history

Playing
- 1994–2000: Hyundai / Daejeon Hyundai Dynat / Daejeon Hyundai Gullivers
- 1995–1997: → Sangmu (military service)
- 2000–2002: Changwon LG Sakers
- 2003: Seoul SK Knights
- 2003–2006: Jeonju KCC Egis

Coaching
- 2006–2008: Cheonan KB Savers (assistant coach/head coach)
- 2008: South Korea women's national team
- 2011–2012: Seoul Samsung Thunders (assistant coach)
- 2015–2017: University of Suwon
- 2018–2020: Myongji University
- 2020–2022: Changwon LG Sakers

Career highlights
- As player: 3× KBL Championship (1998, 1999, 2004); 3× KBL regular season champion (1998, 1999, 2000); KBL Most Valuable Player Award (2001); KBL Playoffs MVP (1999); 2× KBL Best 5 (2000, 2001); Fair Play Award (1998)

- Cho Sung-won
- Hangul: 조성원
- Hanja: 趙成遠
- RR: Jo Seongwon
- MR: Cho Sŏngwŏn

Cho Sung-won (born August 24, 1971) is a South Korean basketball coach, former commentator and retired player. His twelve-year playing career began during the last years of the amateur era and coincided with the establishment of the Korean Basketball League. As a coach, he is one of the rare few who have coached both men's and women's teams at both the professional and collegiate levels. He was most recently head coach of Changwon LG Sakers.

Known as a three-pointer specialist during his playing days, Cho was nicknamed "Kangaroo Shooter" as his shooting motion resembled that of a kangaroo jumping. He was considered short for his position as a forward-shooting guard swingman, prompting him to find ways to overcome his lack of height.

== Early years ==
Cho started playing basketball late compared to most of his contemporaries, only taking up the sport in eighth grade. He attended Hongik University High School but was not a stand-out and was told to quit the team at one point. However, his passion for basketball led him to continuously practice and earn his spot in the team. At Hongik, he first met Lee Sang-min, who would be his Hyundai and Sangmu teammate and professional rival as both players and head coaches.

== Playing career ==
=== College ===
Cho went on to Myongji University. Initially he thought of accepting the offer from Yonsei University, his father's alma mater, but opted for Myongji since he would be guaranteed playing time. Myongji was largely overshadowed by the Yonsei's dominance in the National Basketball Festival, then the main amateur competition. During his senior year, he made headlines after scoring 37 points in an upset of powerhouses Chung-Ang University and finishing fourth overall in the scoring rankings, despite Myongji being eliminated early.

=== Professional ===
Prior to graduating, Cho was scouted by both Hyundai Electronics and Samsung Electronics and signed with the former. In 1995 he enlisted for mandatory military service together with Lee and was assigned to the Sangmu team after completing basic training. By the time they were discharged in 1997, the professional league had just been established. With the signing of Hanyang University forward Choo Seung-gyun that year, the famed "Lee-Cho-Choo trio" was formed and spearheaded Hyundai's domination during the early years of the league. Cho's scoring prowess and Choo's physicality and shooting accuracy were backed up by Lee's playmaking and passing skills. Cho first gained the reputation as clutch performer; his form was inconsistent at times during the regular season but he would score during crucial moments of the fourth quarter and in the playoffs.

Cho was signed by Changwon LG Sakers in a surprise trade for Yang Hee-seung after the 1999–2000 season ended. Under coach Kim Tae-hwan, LG stormed the league with Cho at the forefront, averaging a record 103.6 points in nine games, an unprecedented record to this day. With his new team, Cho averaged 25.7 points during the 2000–01 regular season, ranked 1st among domestic players (5th overall, among both domestic and foreign players) and was also free throw percentage leader, winning the KBL Most Valuable Player Award. He lived up to his reputation for rising to the occasion during the playoffs, averaging 22.2 points in 5 games, as LG reached the Championship finals for the first time in its history. Unfortunately, LG were unable to overcome a Joo Hee-jung-inspired Suwon Samsung Thunders.

In December 2002, Cho joined Seoul SK Knights. After the season ended, he returned to his first team, which had since moved to Jeonju and become Jeonju KCC Egis. He retired at the end of the 2005–06 season. In a 2021 interview, Cho stated that the last five years of his career was spent dealing with chronic pain as the condition of his knee had deteriorated to the point where he had difficulty climbing stairs for a period of time. His last season was also marred by a DUI charge during one of his off-days, which he unsuccessfully attempted to hide from his coaches.

At the time of his retirement, Cho was ranked seventh for the most career three-pointers scored in KBL history and holds the record for the most consecutive three-pointers scored in a single game, a record which would remain untouched for fifteen years until it was tied by point guard Heo Hoon in 2019. He was also known as a "clean" player who was never whistled for an unsportsmanlike foul and rarely argued with referees or match officials.

== Post-playing career ==
After retiring, Cho went straight into coaching and spent two seasons with WKBL team Cheonan KB Savers. He took a break from coaching to begin graduate studies. While completing his doctorate part-time he juggled duties as a lecturer and a commentator at SBS Sports. His research topic was on how basketball players' height affected their physical strength, which was partly inspired by his own experience as one of the league's shortest players.

In 2015, Cho took over as head coach of the University of Suwon, one of the few universities sponsoring a women's basketball team. He turned the largely unknown program into a championship contender and finished runner-up twice in the U-League women's basketball playoffs. In 2017 he moved to Myongji University to be the new head coach.

Cho returned to Changwon LG Sakers after eighteen years, taking over from Hyun Joo-yup in April 2020. He resigned at the end of the 2021–22 season after LG failed to qualify for the playoffs. LG had been on track to secure its position at sixth place, the final playoff spot, but lost it to Daegu KOGAS Pegasus after a tight race.

== Personal life ==
Cho earned his doctorate in 2017 from Myongji University.

Cho is extremely guarded about his personal life and his family, rarely mentioning his family even in casual interviews and not posting a wedding announcement in the newspaper as is the practice among fellow professional athletes. He has a son Cho Jung-min who played college basketball for Dankook University.

== See also ==
- List of Korean Basketball League annual statistical leaders
