= Yang Hee-jong =

South Korean basketball player

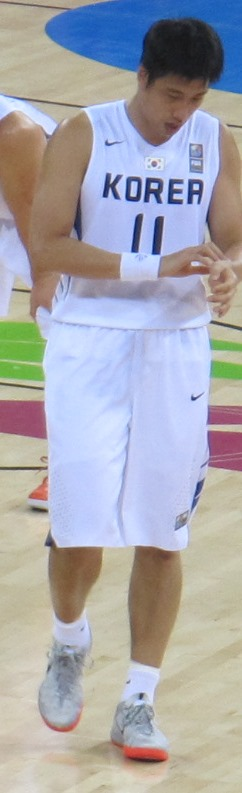

Personal information
- Born: May 11, 1984 (age 42) Suwon, South Korea
- Listed height: 6 ft 4 in (1.93 m)

Career information
- High school: Samil Commercial High School
- College: Yonsei University
- KBL draft: 2007: 1st round, 3rd overall pick
- Playing career: 2007–2023
- Position: Small forward

Career history
- 2007–2023: Anyang KT&G Kites / Anyang KGC
- 2009–2011: → Sangmu (military service)

Career highlights
- 4× KBL Championship (2012, 2017, 2021, 2023); KBL regular season champion (2017); KBL Defensive Player of the Year (2014); 6× KBL Defensive Best 5 (2009, 2015, 2016—2019)
Medals
Representing South Korea
Men's basketball
Asian Games
Silver medal – second place	2010 Guangzhou	Team
Gold medal – first place	2014 Incheon	Team
East Asian Games
Gold medal – first place	2009 Hong Kong	Team

- Korean name
- Hangul: 양희종
- Hanja: 梁熙鍾
- RR: Yang Huijong
- MR: Yang Hŭijong

Yang Hee-jong (born 11 May 1984) is a South Korean former professional basketball player.

== Early life ==
Yang is a native of Suwon and had been a star taekwondo athlete in elementary school but his PE teacher suggested that he try basketball as he was taller than his peers. As a student at Samil Commercial High School, Yang quickly drew the attention of college basketball recruiters as well as youth national team selectors after they won the school's first ever basketball tournament.

== College career ==
Yang played college basketball for Yonsei University. His teammates at that time included best friend Kim Tae-sul and national teammate Ha Seung-jin, who had been his junior in high school. He and Kim were part of the Yonsei team which dominated and won the National Basketball Festival (농구대잔치) competition, then the main collegiate competition, for two consecutive years. In the 2004 final against Chung-Ang University, he scored a double-double (points and rebounds).

== Professional career ==
Yang was drafted third overall by Anyang KT&G Kites in the 2007 KBL rookie draft. The 2007 draft was later retrospectively dubbed the "Golden Draft" as it also included 2014 Asian Games gold medalist Kim Tae-sul and KBL regular season MVP Award winners Park Sang-oh and Ham Ji-hoon, with Ham and Yang being "one club men".

The first two seasons were largely unspectacular as Yang played regularly, averaging 25 to 30 minutes, but was overshadowed by fellow 2007 draftees Ham Ji-hoon and Kim Tae-sul. He was given the moniker mu-rok (무록), a shortened colloquialism for "no record", referring to the fact that he was a behind-the-scenes player who did the "dirty work" defending the post but had no impressive statistics to show for it. During the 2008–09 season, he ranked tenth overall (among both domestic and foreign players) in blocks, the only forward to have ranked so high; the two domestic players ranked before him were center Ha Seung-jin and Kim Joo-sung, who was a forward-center swingman. Although Anyang failed to qualify for the playoffs that season, he and Joo Hee-jung stood out for their efforts, with Yang earning a spot in the Defensive Best 5 for the first time and Joo winning the MVP.

In April 2009, Yang enlisted for mandatory military service and was assigned to the Korea Armed Forces Athletic Corps's Sangmu team after completing basic training. During his time at Sangmu, he was given the chance to play in a more offensive role and posted his best statistic in scoring to date, averaging 16.1 points in 9 games, in the 2009–10 KBL Winter League. His good form did not go unnoticed and he was named in the national team for the 2010 Asian Games. He was discharged and returned to Anyang for the last few games of the 2010–11 season.

While he was away, Anyang strengthened the team by drafting rookie guards Park Chan-hee and Lee Jung-hyun and center Oh Se-keun. Yang went unnoticed during the 2011–12 regular season but gained a reputation as a "big game player" for his clutch performances during the playoffs. The relatively young squad suffered the embarrassment of scoring only 41 points in the January game against eventual regular season champions Wonju Dongbu Promy and setting an all-time record for the lowest score in a league game. They eventually managed to win the KBL Championship that season, Anyang KGC's first ever championship title.

The 2011–12 Championship-winning team was soon split up as Kim was traded to Jeonju KCC Egis while Park, Lee and Oh all enlisted for mandatory military one after another. Yang was named team captain ahead of the 2014–15 season.

During the 2016-17 season, Yang lived up to his reputation for rising to the occasion during big games by leading the team to the playoffs. Anyang KGC met Seoul Samsung Thunders in the playoff finals and team morale was at a low after a fight broke out between his teammate shooting guard Lee Jung-hyun and Thunders player Lee Gwan-hee during Game 2. With top-scorer Lee Jung-hyun failing to score in the double digits and Anyang trailing by 11 points, Yang was forced to step up as their main shooter during the second half; he was a defensive specialist well-known for his poor field goal percentage, to the extent that opponents utilized the strategy of forcing his teammates to pass the ball to him around the perimeter. During Game 3, he scored 13 points, 5 rebounds and 5 assists, most of which were recorded during the fourth quarter and while nursing two injured fingers in his dominant hand. He opted against sitting out of Game 6 and scored a personal best record of eight three-pointers as Anyang KGC narrowly won the game and the final series 4–2 to lift the Championship trophy.

During the 2018-19 season, Yang reached a career milestone of 500 steals in December, becoming the 30th player in KBL history to reach the milestone. His contracted ended that season. He decided to remain at Anyang KGC and signed a three-year contract.

With the emergence of Moon Seong-gon, it was expected that Yang's starting position would be under threat. Instead he formed a defensive partnership with Moon, his experience complementing Moon's shooting skills and pace. The duo have won three KBL Defensive Player of the Year awards between them and voted into the KBL Defensive Best 5 multiple times. During the quarterfinals in the 2020-21 playoffs, they were dubbed "Defense Kings" after holding back a Busan KT Sonicboom team which had some of the league's most prolific offensive players. Anyang KGC went on to win the KBL Championship that season. During the playoffs, Yang was diagnosed with a ruptured plantar fascia but refused treatment until the final ended.

Yang was only able to return to the court in the second round of the 2021–22 season, having spent the off-season and the first round in rehabilitation for the injury he sustained during the playoffs. He was mostly used as a substitute player or started in important games. Living up to his reputation as a "man of the playoffs", Yang scored 15 points in Game 1 of the quarter-final series against Daegu KOGAS Pegasus. Anyang were ultimately unable to defend their Championship, losing to Seoul SK Knights in the final after a bitterly-fought series. His three-year contract ended that season but Yang chose to remain at Anyang and signed a three-year contract on May 23. The renewed contract would effectively keep him at the club for the remainder of his professional career.

== National team career ==
Yang was called up to the youth national teams and participated in the 2003 FIBA Under-19 World Championship. He made his senior national team debut at the 2007 FIBA Asia Championship. At the 2009 FIBA Asia Championship, he had his best individual tournament to date and helped the Koreans to a seventh-place finish while averaging a 12 points and 4.9 rebounds per game. Despite his efforts, Korea failed to qualify for the semifinals of the tournament for the first time in their 25 tournament appearances.

Yang has participated in the 2010 and 2014 Asian Games.

== Personal life ==
Yang married dentist Kim Sa-ran in 2019. They have a son (born February 2020) and a daughter (born February 2021).
