= Yang Dong-geun (basketball) =

South Korean basketball player

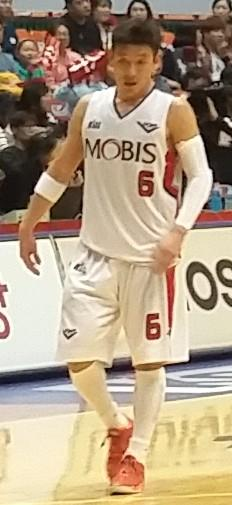

Personal information
- Born: September 14, 1981 (age 45) Seoul, South Korea
- Listed height: 5 ft 11 in (1.80 m)

Career information
- High school: Yongsan High School
- College: Hanyang University
- Playing career: 2004–2020
- Position: Guard
- Number: 6
- Coaching career: 2021–present

Career history

Playing
- 2004–2020: Ulsan Hyundai Mobis Phoebus
- 2007–2009: → Sangmu (loan)

Coaching
- 2021–2025: Ulsan Hyundai Mobis Phoebus (assistant coach)
- 2025–present: Ulsan Hyundai Mobis Phoebus

Career highlights
- KBL Championship (2007, 2010, 2013, 2014, 2015, 2019); KBL Playoffs MVP (2007, 2013, 2015); KBL Rookie of the Year (2005); KBL Most Valuable Player Award (2006, 2007, 2015, 2016); KBL Defensive Player of the Year (2011, 2013)
Medals
Representing South Korea
Men's basketball
Asian Games
Silver medal – second place	2010 Guangzhou	Team
Gold medal – first place	2014 Incheon	Team
FIBA Asia Championship
Bronze medal – third place	2007 Japan	Team
Bronze medal – third place	2011 China	Team
Bronze medal – third place	2013 Philippines	Team

Yang Dong-geun (born September 14, 1981) is a South Korean retired basketball player for Ulsan Mobis Phoebus and the Korean national team, where he participated at the 2014 FIBA Basketball World Cup. During his sixteen-year career, he won the KBL Rookie of the Year and was named Most Valuable Player (MVP) in KBL four times. He spent his entire playing career with Ulsan Mobis Phoebus, having been at the forefront of Ulsan's dominance in the league from the early 2000's. Since retiring after the 2019-20 season, he has returned to the team as a coach.

== Early life ==
Yang enjoyed playing basketball since his elementary school days. As he had been short compared to his peers, he never considered going professional until he had a late growth spurt and started playing college basketball. He attended Yongsan High School, which is known as a high school basketball powerhouse, but was neither a highly-rated prospect or a regular at that time. One of his contemporaries was Lee Jung-suk, who was a year behind him. He overlooked by the "big three" universities in collegiate basketball: Yonsei University, Korea University and Chung-Ang University.

== Playing career ==
=== College days ===
Yang was recruited by Hanyang University despite not being a regular in high school. At that time, Hanyang was not a particularly well-known basketball program and was better known for its baseball team. His close friend and future professional rival Cho Sung-min would join him two years later.

During his senior year, Yang led Hanyang to a runner-up finish at the MBC Cup. He was then thrust into the spotlight for leading Hanyang to a 96-91 upset against Yonsei in the National Basketball Festival (농구대잔치), the other main collegiate competition. Yonsei had been on a 39-game winning streak in the tournament and boasted a star-studded team which included Ha Seung-jin, Kim Tae-sul and Yang Hee-jong. Although Hanyang finished third, Yang ranked first in assists in the competition.

=== Professional career ===
During the 2004 KBL rookie draft, Yang made history by becoming the first player not from a "big three" college basketball program to be drafted first in the first round. He was selected by Jeonju KCC Egis, who had the first overall pick, but was immediately traded to Ulsan Mobis Phoebus in exchange for two players. There were initial doubts as he was considered short by KBL standards but he established himself as an integral member of the team due to his physicality and accurate shooting and passing. In his debut game, a loss to Seoul Samsung Thunders, he scored 13 points, 4 rebounds and 4 assists despite having a distinct height disadvantage. He averaged 11.5 points and 6.1 assists and was named KBL Rookie of the Year.

Yang formed a tandem with foreign recruit Chris Williams and led Ulsan Mobis Phoebus to the 2007 Championship, his first title. During the final, they faced a Busan KTF Magic Wings which had Cho Sung-min and Shin Ki-sung and won four out of seven games in a tightly-contested race. He averaged 19.1 points, 3.4 rebounds and 7.3 assists during the playoffs and was named Playoffs MVP.

In May 2007, a week after his wedding and the playoffs, Yang enlisted for mandatory military service. He enlisted together with Cho and they were assigned to the Sangmu team after completing basic training.

== Coaching career ==
Yang declared his interest in coaching after retiring as a player and went sent to the United States for a training course. He returned to Ulsan Hyundai Mobis Phoebus as a coach under Yoo Jae-hak from the 2021–22 season onwards.

== Personal life ==
Yang married his college classmate Kim Jung-mi in 2007 after a seven-year courtship. They have a son and a daughter.

Yang is an avid baseball fan and is best friends with Lee Bum-ho. He was at Lee's retirement game in 2019.

Yang shares the same name, written with the exact same Hanja characters, as an actor and hip hop artist who is two years older than him. The older Yang is known as an avid basketball fan and posted a retirement tribute on his Instagram to the basketball player quipping that his life as an actor just got started at age forty while a professional athlete's life ended at the same age.

== See also ==
- List of Korean Basketball League annual statistical leaders
