= Lee Jung-hyun (basketball, born 1987) =

South Korean basketball player (born 1987)

No. 3 – Seoul Samsung Thunders
- Position: Guard
- League: KBL

Personal information
- Born: March 3, 1987 (age 39) Gwangju, South Korea
- Listed height: 6 ft 3 in (1.91 m)
- Listed weight: 196 lb (89 kg)

Career information
- High school: Gwangju High School
- College: Yonsei University
- Playing career: 2010–present

Career history
- 2010–2017: Anyang KGC
- 2013–2015: →Sangmu
- 2017–2022: Jeonju KCC Egis
- 2022–present: Seoul Samsung Thunders

Career highlights
- 2× KBL champion (2012, 2017); KBL Most Valuable Player Award (2019); 4× KBL Best 5 (2016–2019); KBL Sixth Man Award (2012)

- Korean name
- Hangul: 이정현
- Hanja: 李政玹
- RR: I Jeonghyeon
- MR: I Chŏnghyŏn

Lee Jung-hyun (born March 3, 1987) is a South Korean professional basketball player for Jeonju KCC Egis in the Korean Basketball League and the South Korean national team.

== Early life ==
Lee played baseball and football throughout elementary school. A promising football prospect, he had considered becoming a professional football player. He started playing basketball in sixth grade when his elementary school decided to start a basketball team and a classmate recruited him to join the team since he already had an athletic background. As a student at Gwangju High School he gained the attention of college recruiters for his shooting skills.

== Career ==
=== College ===
Lee played college basketball for Yonsei University. He was largely unnoticed during his freshman year due to the presence of Kim Tae-sul and Yang Hee-jong, both in their senior season. During his senior year he was Yonsei's leader in points, assists and rebounds and led the team to the final of the National Basketball Festival (the main collegiate competition at that time) for the first time in five years.

=== Professional ===
==== Anyang KT&G / Anyang KGC (2010–2017) ====
In the 2010 KBL rookie draft, Lee was drafted by Busan KT Sonicboom second overall and then traded to Anyang KT&G in a player exchange. Although he scored 19 points and impressed in his debut, he spent his first two seasons as the sixth man and went on to the win the Sixth Man Award at the 2011-12 KBL awards ceremony. He enlisted for mandatory military service in April 2013 and joined the Sangmu team after completing basic training. He was discharged in January 2015, returning to the team roster immediately.

During the 2015–16 season Lee was a mainstay of the Anyang team which reached the semi-finals of the play-offs, especially in clutch situations. He was the only Anyang player voted into the KBL Best 5 that season.

Lee was part of the Anyang team which won a rare "double" during the 2016–17 season, winning both the regular season as well as the KBL Championship. The top-scoring domestic player that season, he was nominated for the KBL Most Valuable Player Award (MVP) award but lost to teammate Oh Se-keun. Despite his stellar record, Lee instead became better known for an incident during the playoffs, when Anyang KGC met Seoul Samsung Thunders in the finals. During Game 2, he elbowed Thunders shooting guard Lee Gwan-hee, his former Yonsei teammate, in the neck while defending him and latter forcefully pushed him down on the ground as retaliation. Both were disciplined and fined for unsporting behavior, with Lee Jung-hyun whistled for a foul and Lee Gwan-hee being ejected for an unsportsmanlike foul and suspended for the next game. As a result, he was booed by irate Thunders fans throughout Game 3 and failed to replicate his form, only scoring 9 points.

==== Jeonju KCC Egis (2017–2022) ====
After his contract with Anyang KGC ended, Lee became a free agent and joined Jeonju KCC Egis for the 2017–18 season. In December 2017, he reached a milestone of appearing in his 300th consecutive KBL-sanctioned "A" match (professional match). He was voted KBL Most Valuable Player of the 2018–19 season as he led the league in points scored, averaging 17.2 points, among domestic players. His win made him the first Jeonju KCC Egis player in 20 years to win MVP and only the second MVP winner not from a Championship-winning team or league top-three team since the KBL was established. In December 2019, he was nominated for and won the Male Basketball Player of the Year, voted for by league coaches and his KBL peers, at the annual Dong-a Sports Awards honoring domestic professional athletes across all disciplines.

Lee was a key player in KCC winning the 2020–21 regular season and reaching the finals of the play-offs, losing the KBL Championship title to his former team Anyang KGC. However, he also became a controversial figure when the KBL released a list of players who were caught "flopping" (faking fouls) that season and his name was at the top of the list.

Lee's appearance record has extended into the 2021–22 season. in December, he reached the record of playing in 500 consecutive KBL-sanctioned "A" games.

=== National team ===
Lee participated in the 2017 FIBA Asia Cup. However, his form during the group stage was inconsistent. In South Korea's opening Group C game against hosts Lebanon, Lee failed to score all five attempted three-pointers and his and shooting guard Heo Ung's lackluster performance around the perimeter were specifically pointed out as a major cause for South Korea's shock loss to the host nation. He bounced back to score 19 points in the next game, a win against Kazakhstan. For the next few games, his assist tally increased as he was switched into a combo guard role rather than a forward-shooting guard swingman.

Lee was in the final 12-man squad and named captain for the 2019 FIBA World Cup. In their opening Group B game against fifth-ranked Argentina, he scored 15 points, the only South Korean player other than Ra Gun-ah to score in the double digits. He was injured in the game against China and was forced to sit out of their last game of the tournament, against the Ivory Coast.

=== Controversy ===
Lee's otherwise stellar 2016–17 season was marred by his infamous confrontation with Lee Gwan-hee during the playoffs. It has been speculated that both players, who are not usually known for such physical confrontations on the court, had already been on bad terms since their university days but both players and other fellow Yonsei alumni have declined to further elaborate on the matter. Ever since the incident, any games in which the two players meet has received more attention from the media and fans. Their alleged "feud" has been indirectly referenced numerous times during "draft day" for the annual All-Star Game, with fellow players and coaches noting that they should not be placed in the same team.

After departing Anyang KGC, Lee gained the moniker eu-ak-sae (으악새), which is the Korean equivalent of the onomatopoeia "Whoops!", from the media and fans due to his "flopping" (faking fouls). In the 2020–21 season alone, he tallied eleven fake fouls, the most of any domestic player and nearly twice as many as the second-placed Lee Dae-sung.

== Personal life ==
Lee is a fan of his hometown baseball team Kia Tigers and has been spotted attending their games during his off-season.

Since 2019, Lee has been referred to as "big Lee Jung-hyun" (큰 정현) by other players and in the media due to another younger player having the exact same name being called up to the senior national team for the same game. "Small Lee Jung-hyun" (작은 정현) is also an alumnus of Yonsei University and was drafted by Goyang Orion Orions in the 2021 rookie draft. Although their names are spelled the same in Hangul, their given names are written differently in Hanja.
