= Ha Seung-jin =

South Korean basketball player (born 1985)

Ha Seung-Jin
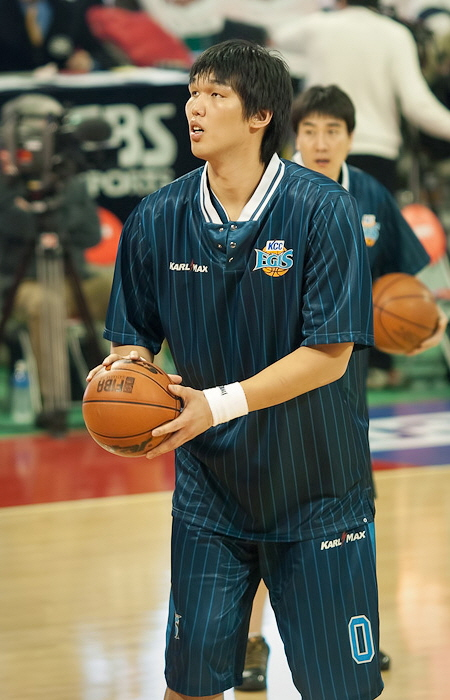
- Ha with Jeonju KCC Egis in 2010

Personal information
- Born: August 4, 1985 (age 41) Seoul, South Korea
- Listed height: 7 ft 3 in (2.21 m)
- Listed weight: 305 lb (138 kg)

Career information
- High school: Samil Commercial (Suwon, Gyeonggi Province)
- College: Yonsei (2003–2004)
- NBA draft: 2004: 2nd round, 46th overall pick
- Drafted by: Portland Trail Blazers
- Playing career: 2004–2019
- Position: Center
- Number: 5

Career history
- 2004: Portland Reign
- 2004–2006: Portland Trail Blazers
- 2006: →Fort Worth Flyers
- 2006–2007: Anaheim Arsenal
- 2008–2012, 2014–2019: Jeonju KCC Egis

Career highlights
- KBL championship (2009, 2011); KBL Playoffs MVP (2011); 2× KBL All-Star (2010, 2011); 3× KBL Best 5 (2010, 2011, 2016); KBL Rookie of the Year (2009)
- Stats at NBA.com
- Stats at Basketball Reference
Medals
Men's basketball
Representing South Korea
Asian Games
Silver medal – second place	2010 Guangzhou	Men's basketball
FIBA Asia Championship
Bronze medal – third place	2011 Wuhan	Men's basketball

- Ha Seung-jin
- Hangul: 하승진
- Hanja: 河昇鎮
- RR: Ha Seungjin
- MR: Ha Sŭngjin

Ha Seung-jin (Korean: 하승진; born August 4, 1985) is a South Korean former professional basketball player who has played in the National Basketball Association (NBA) and the NBA D-League. He was a second round draft pick (46th overall) of the Portland Trail Blazers in the 2004 NBA draft. At 7 ft 3 in, 305 lb, he was among the tallest players in the NBA. He is also the first and only South Korean to have played in the NBA.

== Early life and college career ==
Ha Seung-jin attended his father's alma mater Samil Commercial High School in Suwon with his childhood friend Yang Hee-jong, who was a year older. The duo led Samil's basketball team to its first ever national championship title. He initially planned on entering the 2003 NBA draft held in June but decided on playing college basketball first and accepted an early offer from Yonsei University. It meant that he would be allowed to join the Yonsei team for the 2003 fall semester despite still being a high school senior. His contemporaries at Yonsei included Yang and future Jeonju KCC Egis teammate Kim Tae-sul. After playing only seven games for Yonsei, he left for the United States to make himself eligible for the 2004 NBA draft.

== Professional career ==
=== NBA career (2004–2007) ===
Ha arrived in Los Angeles, California in 2004 to prepare himself for the 2004 NBA draft. Ha was drafted with the 46th overall selection by the Portland Trail Blazers.

He played briefly with the Portland Reign of the ABA. Ha joined the Portland Trail Blazers in the middle of the 2004-05 season. Ha played in only 19 games that season, averaging 5.5 minutes per game; however, on April 20 against the Los Angeles Lakers, he scored a career high 13 points to help the Trail Blazers win the game. During the 2005-06 season Ha was assigned to the NBA D-League's Fort Worth Flyers on March 28, 2006, where he played for five games but did not make an impact. When fellow Blazer centers Theo Ratliff and Joel Przybilla were unable to play due to injury, Ha started four games, averaging 11 minutes playing time.

On July 31, 2006, Ha was traded to the Milwaukee Bucks in a four-player deal. On October 28, 2006 (prior to the start of the 2006-07 season), he was waived by the Bucks. He was acquired by the Anaheim Arsenal of the NBA Development League on December 31, 2006, whom he spent time with.

=== Jeonju KCC Egis (2008–2019) ===
Ha returned to South Korea and joined the 2008 Korean Basketball League draft, signing with Jeonju KCC Egis. He won the 2009 and 2011 KBL Championships, winning the play-off MVP award in the latter. After the 2018–19 season ended, he became a free agent and chose to retire rather than re-sign or join another team.

=== National team ===
Ha has represented the South Korea national basketball team in the 2009 FIBA Asia Championship, 2010 Asian Games, and 2011 FIBA Asia Championship.

== NBA career statistics ==
Legend
GP	Games played	GS	Games started	MPG	Minutes per game
FG%	Field goal percentage	3P%	3-point field goal percentage	FT%	Free throw percentage
RPG	Rebounds per game	APG	Assists per game	SPG	Steals per game
BPG	Blocks per game	PPG	Points per game	**Bold**	Career high

=== Regular season ===
Year	Team	GP	GS	MPG	FG%	3P%	FT%	RPG	APG	SPG	BPG	PPG
2004–05	Portland	19	0	5.5	.435	.000	**.545**	.9	**.1**	**.1**	**.3**	1.4
2005–06	Portland	**27**	**4**	**7.9**	**.581**	.000	.471	**1.8**	.0	**.1**	**.3**	**1.6**
Career		46	4	6.9	.519	.000	.500	1.5	.1	.1	.3	1.5

== Post-retirement ==
In 2020, Ha became a commentator for the Korean Broadcasting System's sports channel KBS N Sports and mainly commentates for Women's Korean Basketball League (WKBL) games. He was a guest commentator for basketball events at the 2020 Summer Olympics.

== Personal life ==
Ha is the younger of two children. His older sister, Ha Eun-joo, was also a professional basketball player. A 6'8" center, she signed with the Los Angeles Sparks of the WNBA on February 6, 2006, and was later waived on May 19, for failing to arrive in Los Angeles. She hadn’t arrived because of a conflicting contract with Chanson V-Magic of the WJBL. In July 2006, she signed with Incheon Shinhan Bank S-Birds of the WKBL.

Their father Ha Dong-gi is a former basketball player-turned-coach who played for Myongji University but who gave up the sport due to chronic injury problems. Ha Dong-gi had been a member of the team which won silver at the 1978 Asian Games.

Ha married Kim Hwa-yeong in 2012. They have a son (born in 2012) and a daughter (born in 2017).

== Filmography ==
=== Television show ===
Year	Title	Role	Ref.
2022	Over the Top	Contestant	

== See also ==
- List of tallest players in National Basketball Association history
- List of Korean Basketball League annual statistical leaders
