= Joo Hee-jung =

South Korean basketball player

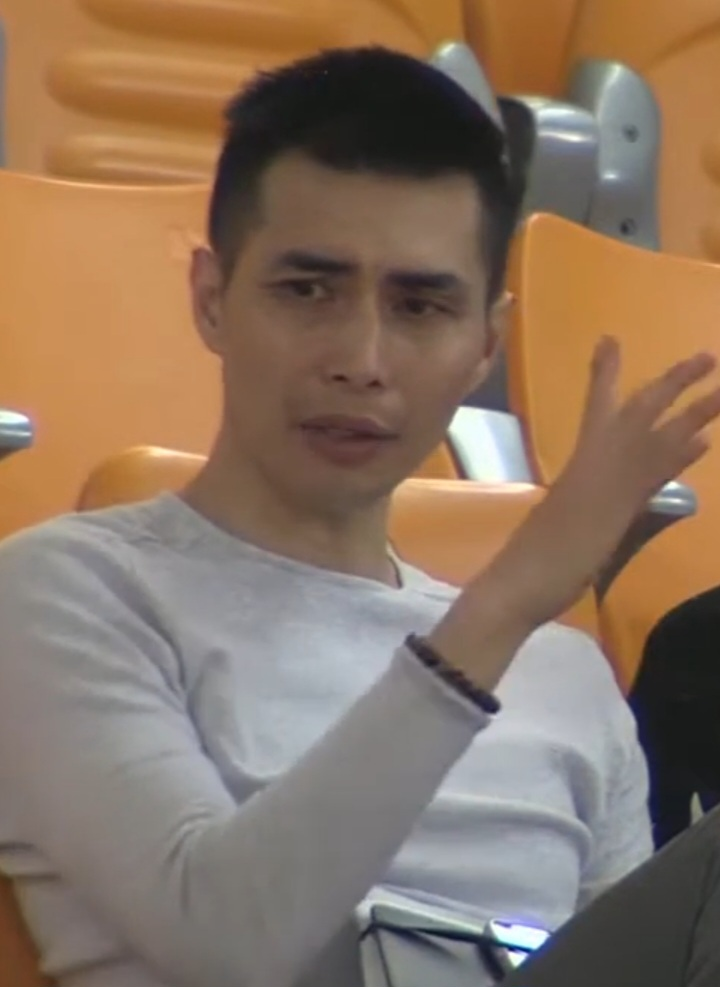

Personal information
- Born: February 4, 1977 (age 49) Busan, South Korea
- Listed height: 6 ft 0 in (1.83 m)

Career information
- College: Korea University
- Position: Guard

Career history
- 1997-1998: Wonju Naray Blue Bird
- 1998-2005: Suwon / Seoul Samsung Thunders
- 2005-2009: Anyang KT&G Kites
- 2009-2015: Seoul SK Knights
- 2015-2017: Seoul Samsung Thunders

Career highlights
- KBL Championship (2001); KBL Rookie of the Year Award (1998); KBL Most Valuable Player Award (2009); KBL Playoffs Most Valuable Player Award (2001); 2× KBL Fair Play Award (2009, 2016); KBL Sixth Man Award (2014); 4× KBL Best 5 (2001, 2007—2009); 3× KBL Defensive Best 5 (1998—2000)

- Joo Hee-jung
- Hangul: 주희정
- Hanja: 朱熙正
- RR: Ju Huijeong
- MR: Chu Hŭijŏng

Joo Hee-jung (born February 4, 1977) is a South Korean basketball coach and retired player. His playing career spanned twenty years with four different teams in the Korean Basketball League. Despite not being a highly-touted prospect in high school and college, he went on to have a career as one of the league's most consistent and prolific guards, leading the league in assists for four consecutive seasons and becoming the all-time leader for career assists and appearances in league games.

After retiring in 2017, Joo returned to his alma mater Korea University as a member of the coaching staff. He was appointed head coach in 2020.

== Early life ==
Born and raised in Busan, Joo was raised by his grandmother after his mother abandoned the family months after his birth. His father had distanced himself from the family due to his dealings with local criminals and was largely absent after being diagnosed with cancer.

Joo began playing basketball in elementary school but was not considered an outstanding prospect due to his height and slight frame. It was not until he went to middle school that he began attracting the attention of scouts. He went on to Donga High School, one of the best known basketball programs in the region, and led them to win their first national tournament in six years.

== Playing career ==
Joo was recruited by Korea University but his college career was largely uneventful as his more senior teammates Hyun Joo-yup and Shin Ki-sung were the center of attention. In 1997, domestic basketball was transitioning from amateur status and the professional Korean Basketball League was established. Joo shocked the college basketball world by dropping out during his sophomore year to sign with a professional team. During the amateur era and for much of the KBL draft's history, players were mostly signed after completing all four years of college, making Joo the first and most high-profile player to have gone professional so early. Joo later revealed that the decision was motivated by financial reasons and the desire to help pay for his father's medical bills.

Joo was signed by Wonju Naray Blue Bird, now Wonju DB Promy, and made his KBL debut in November 1997, scoring 4 points and 2 assists against Gyeongnam LG Sakers. At the time of his debut, he was the youngest player on the roster of a KBL team. Despite the inauspicious start, he averaged 12.4 points that season and won the first ever KBL Rookie of the Year Award. Shin, who played in the same position, was drafted by Naray the following year and Joo signed with Suwon Samsung Thunders in hopes of more playing time.

=== National team ===
Despite his domestic successes, Joo was often overlooked by the likes of Lee Sang-min, Shin Ki-sung, Kim Seung-hyun and then youngster Yang Dong-geun during national team selection. He made the squad for the 2008 World Qualifying Tournament and the 2009 FIBA Asia Championship.

== Player profile ==
Initially known for his speed and pace, Joo developed into an all-rounded guard, able to contribute to both offense and defense. He utilized his stamina to mark and defend his opponents despite being much shorter than most of them. He led in rebounds among domestic players during the 2006–07 season, the only guard to do so in the history of the KBL. At the time of his retirement, he had achieved eight triple-doubles (points, assists and rebounds), becoming the only guard in the leagues's all-time record for career triple-doubles in these three categories.

Joo's playing career coincided with what has been dubbed as the KBL's "golden era" of guards and he was often overlooked due to his lack of "flashy" skills. However, his consistency and longevity meant that he either leads or is in the all-time top 10 of most statistical categories. The lack of long-term injury spells further contributed to his statistical records as he was able to play in most of the 54 league games and playoffs.

== Personal life ==
Joo married Park Seo-in in 2002. They have four children: three daughters and a son. Two of the children appeared on Half-Moon Friends.

== See also ==
- List of Korean Basketball League annual statistical leaders
