= Lee Jung-hyun (basketball, born 1999) =

South Korean basketball player (born 1999)

No. 6 – Goyang Sono Skygunners
- Position: Guard
- League: Korean Basketball League

Personal information
- Born: 14 April 1999 (age 27) Gunsan, North Jeolla Province, South Korea
- Listed height: 187 cm (6 ft 2 in)
- Listed weight: 87 kg (192 lb)

Career information
- High school: Gunsan High School
- College: Yonsei University
- KBL draft: 2021: 1st round, 3rd overall pick
- Playing career: 2021–present

Career history
- 2021–present: Goyang Sono Skygunners

Career highlights
- KBL Best 5 (2024); 2× KBL scoring champion – domestic players (2024, 2025); KBL assists leader (2024); Dong-A Sports Awards Male Basketball Player of the Year (2024)

- Lee Jung-hyun
- Hangul: 이정현
- Hanja: 李政炫
- RR: I Jeonghyeon
- MR: I Chŏnghyŏn

Lee Jung-hyun (Korean: 이정현; born 14 April 1999) is a South Korean professional basketball player for the Korean Basketball League team Goyang Sono Skygunners and the South Korean national team.

== Early life ==
A native of Gunsan, Lee grew up as a fan of Busan KCC Egis, which was then based nearby in the provincial capital of Jeonju. He did not move to Seoul to attend high school as was the common practice for many aspiring basketball players and instead attended Gunsan High School. Despite narrowly losing to perennial powerhouses Samil Commercial High School in two different tournaments, he caught the eye of college recruiters as a well-rounded combo guard as he was responsible for nearly overturning Gunsan's points disadvantage.

== College career ==
Lee was heavily scouted following his high school successes and committed to Yonsei University. He formed a formidable backcourt with guards Yoo Ki-sang and Yang Jun-seok as Yonsei continued its winning streak in the U-League Championships that began with Choi Jun-yong and the 2016 winning team. During his freshman year, he put up 33 points in Game 1 and 17 points in Game 2 of the U-League Championship finals against rivals Korea University and was named Championship MVP.

== National team career ==
=== Junior team ===
Lee was a standout youth international, especially at the 2016 FIBA Under-17 World Championship. He averaged 18.9 points and 3.9 assists and played a key role in South Korea reaching the quarterfinal stage for the first time in competition history.

== Personal life ==
Lee shares the same name with another older player who was born in 1987 and is also an alumnus of Yonsei University. The older Lee Jung-hyun's name is spelled the same in Hangul but written differently in Hanja. This has led to KBL fans to refer to him with various appellations in order to differentiate the two players, the more common being "Small Jung-hyun" (작은 정현, referencing him being the younger of the two) and "Gunsan Jung-hyun" (his hometown is Gunsan while the older Lee Jung-hyun is a Gwangju native).
