= KBL Most Valuable Player Award =

The Korean Basketball League Most Valuable Player Award (MVP) (Korean: 국내선수 MVP) is an annual Korean Basketball League (KBL) award given since 1997 to the best performing player of the regular season. It is only awarded to domestic players (registered as South Korean nationals) as there is a separate award for foreign import players.

Joo Hee-jung, Shin Ki-sung, Kim Seung-hyun, Kim Joo-sung, Yang Dong-geun and Oh Se-keun are the only players to have won both the MVP and Rookie of the Year awards. Kim Seung-hyun is the only one to have won both within the same season.

== Winners ==
^	Denotes player who is still active in the KBL
†	Denotes player whose team won the KBL Championship that year
Player (X)	Denotes the number of times the player had been named MVP at that time
Team (X)	Denotes the number of times a player from this team had won at that time

Season	Player	Position	Team
1997 † (Note: Prior to the founding of the professional Korean Basketball League, the predecessor National Basketball Festival (농구대잔치) ended its final season in January 1997. The first season of the KBL began play in February 1997 to facilitate the transition. Since the 1997–98 season, the KBL season runs from October until April.)	Kang Dong-hee	Guard	Busan Kia Enterprise
1997–98 †	Lee Sang-min	Guard	Daejeon Hyundai Dynat
1998–99 †	Lee Sang-min (2)	Guard	Daejeon Hyundai Dynat (2)
1999–00 †	Seo Jang-hoon	Center	Cheongju SK Knights
2000–01	Cho Sung-won	Forward	Changwon LG Sakers
2001–02 †	Kim Seung-hyun	Guard	Daegu Tongyang Orions
2002–03	Kim Byung-chul	Guard	Daegu Tongyang Orions (2)
2003–04	Kim Joo-sung	Forward	Wonju TG Sambo Xers
2004–05 †	Shin Ki-sung	Guard	Wonju TG Sambo Xers (2)
2005–06 † (Note: Seo Jang-hoon and Yang Dong-geun were joint winners. This is the only instance of two joint winners of the MVP Award.)	Seo Jang-hoon (2)	Center	Seoul Samsung Thunders
2005–06	Yang Dong-geun	Guard	Ulsan Mobis Phoebus (2)
2006–07 †	Yang Dong-geun (2)	Guard	Ulsan Mobis Phoebus (3)
2007–08 †	Kim Joo-sung (2)	Forward	Wonju Dongbu Promy (3)
2008–09	Joo Hee-jung	Guard	Anyang KT&G
2009–10 †	Ham Ji-hoon^	Forward	Ulsan Mobis Phoebus (4)
2010–11	Park Sang-oh	Forward	Busan KT Sonicboom
2011–12	Yoon Ho-young^	Forward	Wonju Dongbu Promy (4)
2012–13	Kim Sun-hyung^	Guard	Seoul SK Knights (2)
2013–14	Moon Tae-jong	Forward	Changwon LG Sakers (2)
2014–15 †	Yang Dong-geun (3)	Guard	Ulsan Mobis Phoebus (5)
2015–16	Yang Dong-geun (4)	Guard	Ulsan Mobis Phoebus (6)
2016–17 †	Oh Se-keun^	Center	Anyang KGC (2)
2017–18	Doo Kyung-min^	Guard	Wonju DB Promy (5)
2018–19	Lee Jung-hyun^	Guard	Jeonju KCC Egis (3)
2019–20 (Note: Due to the COVID-19 pandemic, in March 2020, the KBL board of directors voted to end the season early, in the middle of the fifth round, and cancel the play-offs. Instead the KBL board of directors declared Wonju DB Promy and Seoul SK Knights as joint first place on the league table.)	Heo Hoon^	Guard	Busan KT Sonicboom (2)
2020–21	Song Kyo-chang^	Forward	Jeonju KCC Egis (4)
2021–22 †	Choi Jun-yong^	Guard	Seoul SK Knights (3)
2022–23	Kim Sun-hyung^ (2)	Guard	Seoul SK Knights (4)
2023–24	Ethan Alvano^	Guard	Wonju DB Promy
2024–25	An Yeong-jun^	Forward	Seoul SK Knights (5)
2025–26	Lee Jung-hyun^	Guard	Goyang Sono Skygunners (3)

== Multi-time winners ==
Awards	Player	Team(s)	Years
4	(South Korea) Yang Dong-geun	Ulsan Hyundai Mobis Phoebus	2006, 2007, 2015, 2016
2	(South Korea) Lee Sang-min	Daejeon Hyundai Dynat	1998, 1999
2	(South Korea) Seo Jang-hoon	Cheongju SK Knights / Seoul Samsung Thunders	2000, 2006
2	(South Korea) Kim Joo-sung	Wonju TG Sambo Xers / Dongbu Promy	2004, 2008
2	(South Korea) Kim Sun-hyung	Seoul SK Knights	2013, 2023

== Teams ==
Awards	Teams	Years
6	Ulsan Hyundai Mobis Phoebus (Note: Formerly Busan Kia Enterprise and Ulsan Mobis Phoebus)	1997, 2006, 2007, 2010, 2015, 2016
5	Wonju DB Promy (Note: Formerly Wonju TG Sambo Xers and Wonju Dongbu Promy)	2004, 2005, 2008, 2012, 2018
5	Cheongju / Seoul SK Knights	2000, 2013, 2022, 2023, 2025
4	Jeonju KCC Egis (Note: Formerly Daejeon Hyundai Dynat)	1998, 1999, 2019, 2021
3	Goyang Sono Skygunners (Note: Formerly Daegu Tongyang Orions and Goyang Orion Orions)	2002, 2003, 2026
2	Anyang KT&G / KGC	2009, 2017
2	Busan / Suwon KT Sonicboom	2011, 2020
