= Chun Hee-chul =

South Korean basketball player

Personal information
- Born: June 26, 1973 (age 53) Seoul, South Korea
- Listed height: 195.6 cm (6 ft 5 in)

Career information
- College: Korea University
- Playing career: 1996–2008
- Position: Forward / center
- Coaching career: 2011–present

Career history

Playing
- 1996–2002: Tongyang Confectionery / Daegu Tongyang Orions
- 2002–2003: Jeonju KCC Egis
- 2003–2008: Seoul SK Knights

Coaching
- 2011–present: Seoul SK Knights

Career highlights
- As a Player: KBL Champion (2002); KBL regular season champion (2002); KBL All-Time Legend 12; Seoul SK Knights number 13 retired; As a Head Coach: 2× KBL Champion (2018, 2022); KBL regular season champion (2013)

- Chun Hee-chul
- Hangul: 전희철
- Hanja: 全喜哲
- RR: Jeon Huicheol
- MR: Chŏn Hŭich'ŏl

Chun Hee-chul (born June 26, 1973, in Seoul) is a South Korean basketball coach and retired player. Chun is a swingman who can play in both the center and forward positions. In his prime he boasted athleticism, the ability to dunk and a mid-range jump shot which was rare for players of his height in domestic basketball at that time, earning him the nicknames "Airborne" and "Air Hee-chul".

After retiring as a player, Chun went into coaching. He has been a coach at Seoul SK Knights since 2011 and was appointed head coach ahead of the 2021–22 season.

== Early life ==
Chun began playing basketball in elementary school "by accident" after being encouraged by his father, a sports enthusiast. It was not until he attended Samseon Middle School, a well-known basketball school, that he began aspiring to become a basketball player. He attended Kyungbock High School in Seoul and was recruited by Korea University during his last year of high school. He was middle and high school classmates with future national teammate and best friend Woo Ji-won.

== Playing career ==
=== College career ===
At Korea University, Chun was a member of the dominant "Tiger Corps" which included Hyun Joo-yup, future KBL Rookie of the Year Shin Ki-sung and future KBL regular season MVP Kim Byung-chul. During his senior year, they won the college division of the National Basketball Festival, then one of the main collegiate competitions.

His time at Korea University coincided with what is often retrospectively dubbed the "golden era" of domestic college basketball. He and his teammates, as well as their counterparts from traditional athletic rivals Yonsei University, enjoyed a level of popularity similar to that of idol singers and A-list actors/actresses due to their skills and good looks. Together with Hyun and Yonsei University's Lee Sang-min, Moon Kyung-eun and Woo Ji-won among others, they were collectively dubbed "Oppa Troupe" (오빠부대) by the media.

=== Professional career ===
Chun began his career in 1996 and is among the last generation of players who began their careers during the semi-professional era; the professional league (Korean Basketball League) was founded a year later. He and his college teammate Kim Byung-chul joined the newly founded Daegu-based amateur team of Tongyang Confectionery, which has since moved to Goyang and is now Goyang Orion Orions after the company rebranding. They beat other more established teams such as Kia, Samsung Electronics and Hyundai to win the last ever amateur championship and notably ended Kia's dominance. When the KBL was founded, Chun stayed with the team. During his first season in the newly founded professional league, he averaged 23.10 points, which was unheard of for a domestic player especially with the presence of foreign import players with larger and taller physiques.

In 1998, Chun enlisted for mandatory military service. Unlike many of his counterparts, he was assigned to be a public service worker instead of the Korea Armed Forces Athletic Corps (Sangmu basketball team). In between his routine duties with the Forest Service, he trained in the nearest gym by himself with amateur players. Tongyang were unable to find suitable replacements as he and Kim had enlisted at the same time as several other key players and the mid-table team finished the 1998–99 season at the bottom of the league table. Chun was discharged ahead of the 1999–00 season. His assignment turned out to be a blessing in disguise as he was discharged earlier than his counterparts who joined the Sangmu team.

In 2002, Chun signed with Jeonju KCC Egis but was released at the end of the season. During his brief time at KCC, he was best remembered for an incident during a January game against Seoul Samsung Thunders. He was intentionally struck in the face by Park Sung-hoon but the referee failed to call the foul and Park scored a lay-up immediately afterwards. The referee still did not blow the whistle even though Chun's face was visibly bloodied. Chun's teammate Jung Jae-kun, incensed by the lack of action from the referee and other match officials, retaliated by elbowing Park in the face so hard that Park sustained a broken tooth and jaw and had to be stretchered off. However, Jung was only whistled for a technical foul rather than a more serious flagrant foul, which would have warranted ejection.

In 2003, Chun joined Seoul SK Knights. The 2007–08 season was forgettable as he was mostly on the bench or unavailable due to injuries. With his contract ending that season, he chose to retire rather than join another team or renegotiate another contract. His number 13 jersey was retired by the Knights.

=== National team ===
Chun's versatility meant that he was registered as a center or forward in different competitions. He was part of the squad at the 1996 Atlanta Olympics and a key member of the 1997 ABC Championship-winning team, being named tournament MVP. While completing his military service, he and Woo Ji-won were expected to participate in the 1998 Asian Games but Korean Basketball Association's request was turned down by the government agency overseeing their service term.

Chun was recalled to the squad for the 2002 Asian Games, where he played as a forward due to Seo Jang-hoon and rookie Kim Joo-sung being preferred as the main centers. During the final against a dominant China led by Yao Ming, he and Hyun Joo-yup both scored more than 20 points in a tight game, earning themselves the nickname "China Killers". The Koreans managed to climb back from behind to win 102–100 in overtime; it was their first gold in men's basketball at the Asian Games in two decades.

== Coaching career ==
Chun remained with Seoul SK Knights after retiring as a player. Before going into coaching, he worked as a player performance analyst. He transitioned into coaching and worked under long-time teammate Moon Kyung-eun on the coaching staff. After the 2020–21 season ended, the club announced that Moon would be moving to technical advisor role and Chun became the new head coach.

== Personal life ==
Chun married former air stewardess Kwon Jung-eun in 2003. They have two daughters (born in 2004 and 2006).
