= Kim Seung-hyun (basketball) =

South Korean basketball player

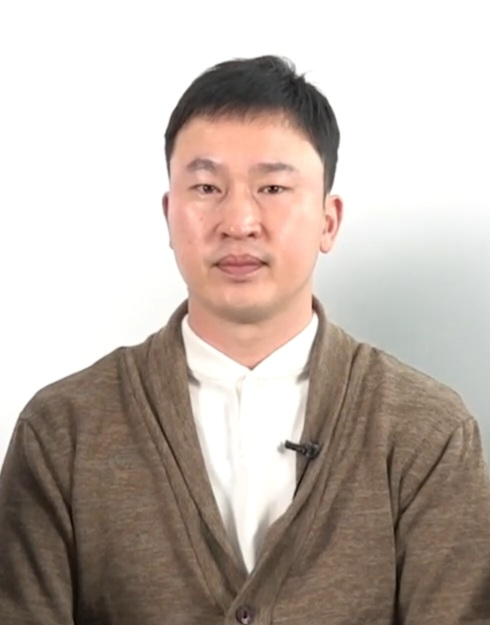

Personal information
- Born: November 23, 1978 (age 47) Incheon, South Korea
- Listed height: 175 cm (5 ft 9 in)

Career information
- College: Dongguk University
- Playing career: 2001–2014
- Position: Point guard

Career history
- 2001–2010: Daegu Tongyang Orions / Daegu Orions
- 2011–2014: Seoul Samsung Thunders

Career highlights
- KBL Championship (2002); 2× KBL regular season champion (2002, 2003); KBL Most Valuable Player Award (2002); 4× KBL Best 5 (2002, 2004—2006); KBL Rookie of the Year Award (2002); KBL assists leader (2002, 2004—2006); KBL steals leader (2002, 2004, 2005, 2007)

- Kim Seung-hyun
- Hangul: 김승현
- Hanja: 金勝鉉
- RR: Gim Seunghyeon
- MR: Kim Sŭnghyŏn

Kim Seung-hyun (born November 23, 1978) is a South Korean retired basketball player. He played for Daegu Orions and Seoul Samsung Thunders in the Korean Basketball League and was a member of the South Korean national team.

Although his heyday was short compared his counterparts, Kim left a lasting impact on the domestic game and is still regarded as one of the best point guards of his generation. He led the league in assists for four seasons, a joint record he shares with Joo Hee-jung and Kang Dong-hee, and also holds the all-time record for assists average per season; in the 2004–05 season he averaged 10.5 assists.

== Early life ==
A native of Incheon, Kim had aspired to become a football player as football was his first sport, but switched sports after being introduced to basketball in fourth grade. He attended Songdo High School, one of the oldest high school basketball programs outside of Seoul. He drew attention for his creative play despite his short stature.

== Playing career ==
=== College ===
Kim surprised recruiters and observers by choosing Dongguk University instead of one of the "big 3" college basketball programs (Yonsei University, Korea University and Chung-Ang University). He drew the attention of KBL scouts for his flashy style of play and passing skills, which stood out despite Dongguk's poor results in collegiate competitions.

=== Professional ===
Kim was the third overall pick of the 2001 KBL rookie draft and was drafted by Daegu Tongyang Orions. Prior to the draft, pundits had speculated that his height would be a stumbling block to him succeeding at professional level and it affected his draft ranking; ironically, the other two players picked ahead of him all had less successful careers. He was immediately integrated into the main team during the 2001–02 season, playing in 54 games. In his first full season, he took the league by storm, averaging 12.2 points and 8.0 assists. They would go on to win the KBL Championship that season. At the end of the season, Kim was voted into the Best 5 and won both the MVP and Rookie of the Year awards, an unprecedented feat that has never been repeated ever since. Together with foreign recruit Marcus Hicks and domestic stars such as Chun Hee-chul and Kim Byung-chul, the Orions became known for their offensive style which combined the players' strengths with flashy skills. It came to an end when Orions relocated to Goyang and Hicks and Chun both moved to other clubs. While his later seasons were mired by the team's poor league standings and a recurring back injury, he led the league in assists for another three seasons.

Kim did not play for the entire 2010–11 season due to a controversial lawsuit he had filed against the Orions. He had been negotiating a renewed contract for a raised salary when changes in the team's management and the KBL's rules regarding salary caps led to a disagreement which then escalated into a public spat. The new management felt that his requested figure was too high and did not match his performances. When Kim refused to back down, the management sought to nullify his contract by any legal means and Kim filed a civil lawsuit against them, the first time in domestic basketball a player has taken his own team to court. As Kim was neither able to play for his own team or transfer to another team, the KBL removed him from its list of registered players for that season, the first time such action had been taken against a player. The KBL stated that the action was taken for practical reasons and reiterated its official stance that both parties should settle their dispute privately. He dropped the lawsuit after he and the management both agreed to enter into mediation rather than engage in a protracted battle in court.

After the lawsuit ended, Kim was traded to Seoul Samsung Thunders for the 2011–12 season. His final years were plagued by injury, poor form and the Thunders' poor results in the league. Furthermore, the domestic game became more defense-oriented and players with tall and large physiques were more preferred, leaving players like Kim at a disadvantage. He eventually retired at the end of the 2013–14 season.

== Player profile ==
At his prime, Kim was known for his speed and passing skills despite being one of the league's shortest players, even for a point guard by current KBL standards. During an era where domestic point guards were still mainly "pass first, score last" players, Kim was one of the earliest point guards in the KBL to average points in the double digits while maintaining high assist averages, paving the way for a younger generation of scoring-oriented point guards such as Kim Nak-hyeon and Heo Hoon to be more accepted by the domestic basketball world. In addition to contributing points and assists, he was known for utilizing his speed and lack of height to his advantage by causing turnovers, reflected in the fact that he led the league in steals for four seasons.

== Other activities ==
Kim was a cast member in the variety show Real Men. In February 2017, he appeared on MBC's variety show King of Mask Singer (episode 99) as a contestant.

Kim returned to basketball and became a commentator for MBC Sports+ in 2017, covering KBL games. When KBL switched broadcasters to SPOTV, Kim moved to the new channel and continued.

== Personal life ==
In May 2018, Kim married actress Han Jung-won. It was reported that they had divorced in November 2021. Han later clarified that they remained friends and that the divorce was mutual.
