= Kim Tae-sul =

South Korean basketball player

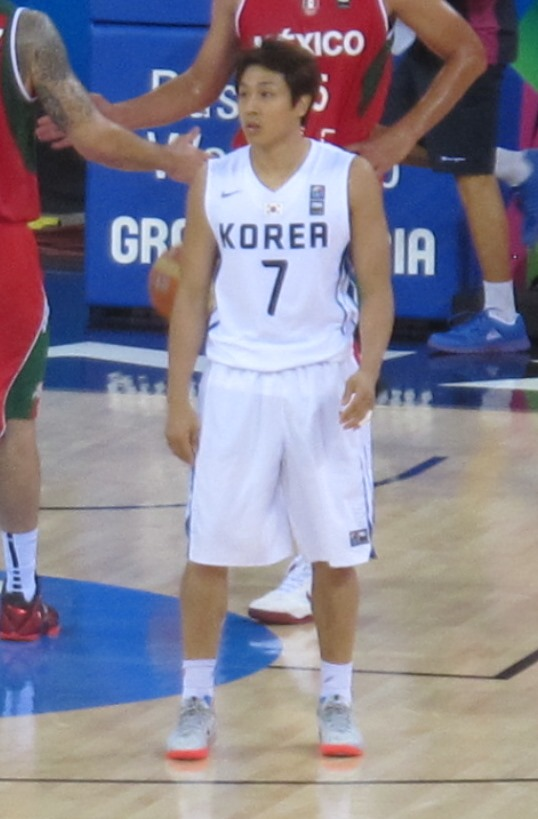

Goyang Sono Skygunners
- Title: Head coach
- League: Korean Basketball League

Personal information
- Born: August 13, 1984 (age 42) Busan, South Korea
- Listed height: 5 ft 11 in (1.80 m)

Career information
- High school: Donga High School
- College: Yonsei University
- KBL draft: 2007: 1st round, 1st overall pick
- Playing career: 2007–2021
- Position: Shooting guard
- Coaching career: 2025–present

Career history

Playing
- 2007–2009: Seoul SK Knights
- 2009–2014: Anyang KGC
- 2014–2016: Jeonju KCC Egis
- 2016–2019: Seoul Samsung Thunders
- 2019–2021: Wonju DB Promy

Coaching
- 2025–present: Goyang Sono Skygunners

Career highlights
- KBL Championship (2012); KBL Rookie of the Year Award (2008); 2× KBL Best 5 (2008, 2012)
Medals
Representing South Korea
Men's basketball
Asian Games
Gold medal – first place	2014 Incheon	Team
FIBA Asia Championship
Bronze medal – third place	2013 Philippines	Team

- Korean name
- Hangul: 김태술
- Hanja: 金泰術
- RR: Gim Taesul
- MR: Kim T'aesul

Kim Tae-sul (Korean: 김태술; born August 13, 1984) is a South Korean basketball coach. During his fourteen-year professional career, Kim played for five different teams, the longest stint being at Anyang KGC where he won the KBL Championship. He was also a member of the South Korea national team and participated in the 2013 FIBA Asia Championship, 2014 FIBA Basketball World Cup and two Asian Games.

== Early life and college years ==
A native of Busan, Kim attended Donga High School. He was one of the stand-outs at his high school and was recruited by Yonsei University, where he would be joined by his future Anyang KGC teammate and best friend Yang Hee-jong. The Yonsei team dominated collegiate competitions after a period of stagnation. In the 2005 MBC Cup, Kim scored 20 points during the final against Chung-Ang University as Yonsei won the competition for a fourth consecutive time.

== Professional career ==
=== Seoul SK Knights (2007–2009) ===
Kim was drafted first overall in the 2007 KBL rookie draft by Seoul SK Knights. He made an immediate impact with double-digit numbers in assists during his first two games and ranked second in assists, the highest ranked rookie player that season. The lack of point guards able to compete with Kim Seung-hyun statistically led the media to dub the younger Kim as "Magic Kid" and he won the KBL Rookie of the Year and named into the KBL Best 5.

=== Anyang (2009–2014) ===
In a surprise move, Seoul SK Knights decided to trade him and another player to Anyang KT&G Kites for former MVP Joo Hee-jung at the end of the 2008–09 season. He immediately enlisted for mandatory military service, serving as a public service worker. It was not until the 2011–12 season that he was able to play for his new team. At that time, his teammates included the recently discharged Yang Hee-jong and newcomers Oh Se-keun, Park Chan-hee and Lee Jung-hyun. The young team managed to reach the final of the Championship playoffs and defeat regular season champions Wonju Dongbu Promy. During his last season with Anyang, he led the league in assists for the first time.

=== Jeonju KCC Egis (2014–2016) ===
With his contract up at Anyang, Kim joined Jeonju KCC Egis. His signing was meant to be part of a major squad rebuilding project by coach Hur Jae but did not play for his new team for the first round of the season due to his participation in both the 2014 FIBA World Cup and Asian Games. He went through a major slump that season as KCC finished ninth, the second last position.

Kim managed to return to form the following season, especially after establishing a tandem with foreign recruits Andre Emmett and Herbert Hill. KCC won the regular season title and reached the final of the Championship playoffs.

=== Final years (2016–2021) ===
Kim moved to Seoul Samsung Thunders, attracted by the prospect of playing under the legendary Lee Sang-min. Although no longer an automatic starter due to his age and physical condition, his experience was highly valued and he served as a mentor to the younger guards in the team. The lack of experienced guards and with Joo Hee-jung nearing retirement, Kim saw much more playing time and won Round MVP of the first round.

At the end of the 2018–19 season, he signed a one-year contract with Wonju DB Promy and was reunited with his former Anyang head coach Lee Sang-beom. He stayed for another season before announcing his retirement on 13 May 2021.

== Post-retirement activities ==
Kim opted not to go into coaching like many of his retired peers had done. He made guest appearances on several variety programs and started a Naver blog, in which he posts about recent developments in both college basketball and the KBL. In June 2022, he was a guest commentator for tvN's coverage of South Korea's friendly games against the Philippines. He was then hired by SPOTV to cover KBL games for the 2022–23 season.

In September 2021, Kim signed with General Entertainment.

== Personal life ==
On February 11, 2025, it was confirmed that Kim would marry actress Park Ha-na in June. The couple married on June 21, 2025, in Seoul.
