= Ricardo Ratliffe =

American-born South Korean basketball player

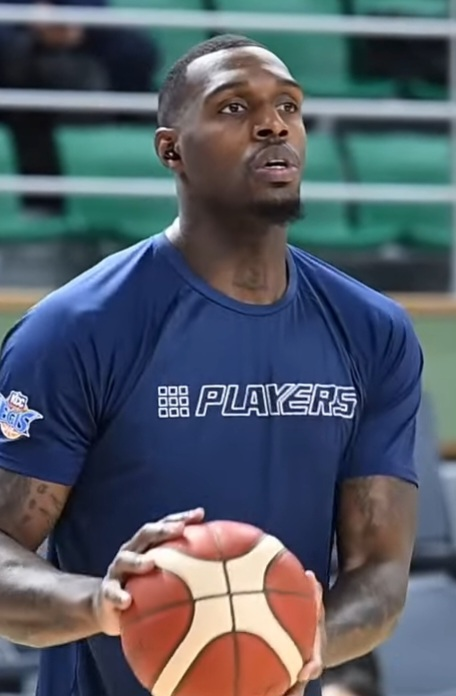

No. 20 – Daegu KOGAS Pegasus
- Position: Center
- League: KBL

Personal information
- Born: February 20, 1989 (age 37) Hampton, Virginia, U.S.
- Listed height: 6 ft 8 in (2.03 m)
- Listed weight: 240 lb (109 kg)

Career information
- High school: Kecoughtan (Hampton, Virginia)
- College: College of Central Florida (2008–2010); Missouri (2010–2012)
- NBA draft: 2012: undrafted
- Playing career: 2012–present

Career history
- 2012–2015: Mobis Phoebus
- 2015–2016: Seoul Samsung Thunders
- 2016: Star Hotshots
- 2016–2017: Seoul Samsung Thunders
- 2017: Star Hotshots
- 2017–2018: Seoul Samsung Thunders
- 2018–2019: Mobis Phoebus
- 2019–2024: Jeonju / Busan KCC Egis
- 2024: Changsha Wantian Yongsheng
- 2024–2025: Magnolia Chicken Timplados Hotshots
- 2025–present: Daegu KOGAS Pegasus

Career highlights
- 4× KBL champion (2013–2015, 2019); 3x KBL All-Star (2016, 2017, 2019); 3× KBL Player of the Year (2015, 2017, 2019); KBL Import of the Year (2017); KBL Defensive Player of the Year (2015); Second-team All-Big 12 (2012); Big 12 Newcomer of the Year (2011); 2× First-team NJCAA All-American (2009, 2010); William Jones Cup MVP (2014); FIBA World Cup Top Scorer (2019)
Medals
Men's basketball
Representing South Korea
Asian Games
Bronze medal – third place	Jakarta–Palembang 2018	Team
William Jones Cup
Gold medal – first place	2014 Taipei
Bronze medal – third place	2018 Taipei

Ricardo Preston Ratliffe, later known as Ra Gun-ah (Korean: 라건아; born February 20, 1989), is an American-born South Korean professional basketball player for the Daegu KOGAS Pegasus of the Korean Basketball League (KBL). He played collegiately at the University of Missouri and was naturalized in January 2018.

== Early life and college career ==
Ratliffe was born in Hampton, Virginia. He played at Kecoughtan High School and the College of Central Florida in Ocala. While at CCF, he earned first team National Junior College Athletic Association All-American honors twice. He averaged 27.4 points and 11.3 rebounds per game as a sophomore.

Completing his college career, Ratliffe chose Missouri over Alabama, Clemson and Arkansas. He averaged 10.6 points and 6.0 rebounds per game in his junior season and was named Big 12 Conference Newcomer of the Year.

In his senior season, Ratliffe helped lead the Tigers to a 30–5 record and a Big 12 tournament championship. Ratliffe averaged 13.9 points, 7.5 rebounds and 1.0 blocks per game as the team's primary post presence. At the close of the season, Ratliffe was named second team All-Big 12. On the season, Ratliffe attained a 69.3% field goal percentage, which led the nation for the 2011–12 season and was a Missouri and Big 12 Conference record. Ratliffe spent much of the season chasing the all-time single-season NCAA record of 74.6%, held by Steve Johnson of Oregon State, leading the mark as late as February 2012.

After the close of the regular season, Ratliffe competed in the 2012 Reese's College All-Star Game at the 2012 Final Four. He scored 21 points and collected 10 rebounds to earn the West team's "Perfect Player" award.

== Professional career ==
After playing in college, Ratliffe was not selected in the 2012 NBA draft. However, he was the first American college player selected in the Korean Basketball League. He was selected sixth overall by Ulsan Mobis Phoebus and began his professional career with them in the 2012–13 season.

In 2014, Ratliffe won the William Jones Cup MVP and joined teammates Chang Yong Song and Tae Young Moon on the tournament Best Five. At the William Jones Cup, He averaged 24.3 points, 15.7 rebounds, and 1.7 blocks per game.

On March 5, 2016, Ratliffe was signed by Star Hotshots of the Philippine Basketball Association (PBA) to replace Denzel Bowles who had to leave for the United States after the death of a relative. On May 9, 2017, Ratliffe was again called by the Star Hotshots as the player they imported for the 2017 Commissioners Cup. On Game 2 of the 2017 semifinal round against the San Miguel Beermen, Ratliffe recorded 25 points and a career-high 35 rebounds in a 76–77 loss to the Beermen.

On November 11, 2019, Ulsan Hyundai Mobis Phoebus traded Ratliffe and Lee Dae-sung to Jeonju KCC Egis. Ratliffe re-signed with Jeonju KCC Egis on September 26, 2020. Ratliffe averaged 17 points, 10.3 rebounds, one steal and 1.3 blocks per game.

On July 16, 2024, Ratliffe signed with Changsha Wantian Yongsheng of the National Basketball League. He averaged 11.83 points, 6.75 rebounds, 1.42 assists in 20.41 minutes in 12 games.

== National team career ==
In January 2018, Ratliffe became a naturalized South Korean. He played for the South Korean national team against the North Korean national team in Pyongyang Arena, Pyongyang, during a July 2018 friendly match. He was given the Korean name Ra Gun-ah after being naturalized.

At the 2019 FIBA World Cup, although he played in only five games, Ratliffe led the tournament with 23.0 points and 12.8 rebounds per game. The South Korean national team finished the tournament in 26th place of 32 teams, after being eliminated in preliminary group.
