= Kim Joo-sung (basketball) =

South Korean basketball player

Kim Joo-Sung
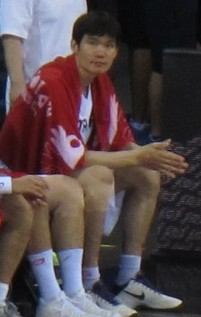

Personal information
- Born: November 9, 1979 (age 47) U-dong, Haeundae-gu, Busan
- Listed height: 6 ft 8.75 in (2.05 m)
- Listed weight: 203 lb (92 kg)

Career information
- High school: Dong-a High School
- College: Chung-Ang University
- Playing career: 2002–2018
- Position: Power forward / center
- Coaching career: 2019–present

Career history

Playing
- 2002–2018: Wonju DB Promy

Coaching
- 2019–present: Wonju DB Promy

Career highlights
- 3× KBL Championship (2003, 2005, 2008); 5× KBL regular season champion (2004, 2005, 2008, 2012, 2018); KBL Rookie of the Year Award (2003); 2× KBL Most Valuable Player Award (2004, 2008); 2× KBL Defensive Player of the Year (2004, 2012); 2× KBL Playoffs Most Valuable Player Award (2005, 2008); 8× KBL Best 5 (2003—2006, 2008, 2009, 2012, 2015); KBL Sixth Man Award (2018); 3× KBL rebounds leader – domestic players (2004, 2006, 2014); 2× KBL blocks leader (2004, 2008); KBL All-Time Legend 12; Wonju DB Promy number 32 retired
Medals
Representing South Korea
Men's basketball
Asian Games
Silver medal – second place	1998 Bangkok	Team
Gold medal – first place	2002 Busan	Team
Silver medal – second place	2010 Guangzhou	Team
Gold medal – first place	2014 Incheon	Team
FIBA Asia Championship
Bronze medal – third place	2007 Japan	Team
Bronze medal – third place	2011 China	Team
Bronze medal – third place	2013 Philippines	Team

- Kim Joo-sung
- Hangul: 김주성
- Hanja: 金鑄城
- RR: Gim Juseong
- MR: Kim Chusŏng

Kim Joo-sung (Korean: 김주성; born 9 November 1979) is a South Korean basketball coach and retired player. A forward-center, he spent his entire sixteen-year playing career with Wonju DB Promy. Since 2019 he has been a coach at Wonju DB Promy.

== Early life ==
A native of Busan, Kim grew up in the district of Haeundae-gu. Kim only began focusing on basketball in high school, relatively late compared to many of his KBL peers. His younger sister Kim Hyang-ran is a former volleyball player. The siblings had a financially unstable upbringing as their childhood coincided with the 1997 Asian financial crisis, which greatly affected South Korea, and both their parents had physical disabilities caused by polio and scoliosis.

== College career ==
Kim played college basketball at Chung-Ang University and drew comparisons to Seo Jang-hoon for his height. During the 2000 National Basketball Festival tournament, he ranked first in rebounds and points scored and named the MVP. His stellar performances in other Korea University Basketball Federation tournaments earned him a call-up to the national team.

== Playing career ==
=== Wonju TG Xers / Wonju DB Promy ===
After college, Kim joined the Wonju TG Xers. He was the first overall pick of the 2002 KBL rookie draft. Kim had one of the best rookie recording averages with 17.04 points, 8.72 rebounds, 2.24 assists, and 2.07 blocks in the season. In addition, he helped the team win the championship keeping the goal in the post-season of the 2002-2003 league. Kim averaged 18.85 points, 8.85 rebounds, and 2.43 shoot-blocks and won the Most Valuable Player of the league in the 2003–2004 season. However, the Xers failed to win the championship of 2003–2004, losing to Jeonju KCC Egis. In spite of the team's loss, The Xers won the championship in the 2004–2005 season, and Kim won the Most Valuable Player of the post-season for the first time.

The Xers was taken over by Dongbu Group, was reorganized to Wonju Dongbu Promy, later shortened to Wonju DB Promy due to the company's rebranding. Though the Promy took third place, they failed in the playoff, losing to Daegu Orions. The next year, Kim was injured and could not participate. Therefore, Promy ranked eighth in the league and did not qualify for the play-offs.

In the 2007–2008 season, his team won the championship by defeating Seoul Samsung Thunders. Kim won the KBL Most Valuable Player Award for the second time and led the league in blocks that season.

During the 2011–12 season, Kim was a key player in Dongbu's defensive prowess, which led to the team earning the nickname "Dongbu Mountain Fortress". Along with center Rod Benson (206 meters) and forward Yoon Ho-young (197 meters), the trio were dubbed the "Triple Posts of the Dongbu Mountain Fortress" by the press after shutting down some of the league's best offensive players. Kim went on to win the KBL Defensive Player of the Year award while Yoon was named regular season MVP and Benson won the Foreign Player of the Year award.

Kim announced that he would be retiring after the 2017-18 season. Although he was mostly the sixth man, he played a crucial role in Promy finishing at the top of the league. He was nominated for the Defensive Player of the Year and won the Sixth Man Award at the annual KBL awards.

Kim is the first player to exceed 1000 blocks in the KBL, earning him the nickname "Emperor of Blocks" (블록슛 황제). He was ranked second, behind Seo Jang-hoon, for the all-time most number of rebounds in KBL history; Seo's record was eventually surpassed by Ra Gun-ah in January 2022. He was the league's highest-paid domestic player from 2004 to 2012. In December 2018, Wonju DB Promy announced that his number 32 jersey would be permanently retired, the club's second jersey to be retired after his former teammate Hur Jae.

=== National team ===
Kim was first called up to the senior national team while in college. He won two gold medals at the Asian Games, the 2002 and 2014 editions.

== Coaching career ==
Kim returned to his former team in 2019 as a member of the coaching staff. Since the 2020-21 season, he also oversees the club's D League reserve team.

== Personal life ==
Kim married Korean-American entrepreneur Park Ji-sun in 2008 after an eight-year courtship. They have two daughters.

Kim's sixteen-year playing career with Wonju DB Promy overlapped with that of Hur Jae and the latter's older son Heo Ung, who was drafted by Promy in 2014. It marked a rare instance in domestic basketball of a player being teammates with both a father-son duo for the same professional team.
