= Woo Ji-won =

South Korean basketball player

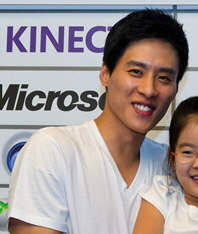
- Woo in 2010

Personal information
- Born: April 2, 1973 (age 53) South Korea
- Listed height: 191 cm (6 ft 3 in)

Career information
- College: Yonsei University
- Playing career: 1996–2010
- Position: Small forward

Career history
- 1996–2001: Daewoo Securities / Incheon Daewoo Zeus / Incheon Shinsegi Bigs
- 2001–2002: Seoul Samsung Thunders
- 2002–2010: Ulsan Mobis Automons / Ulsan Mobis Phoebus

Career highlights
- KBL Championship (2007, 2010); KBL regular season champion (2006, 2007, 2010); KBL Sixth Man Award (2007); Ulsan Hyundai Mobis Phoebus number 10 retired

- Woo Ji-won
- Hangul: 우지원
- Hanja: 禹智元
- RR: U Jiwon
- MR: U Chiwŏn

Woo Ji-won (born 2 April 1973) is a South Korean retired professional basketball player. He played for three different teams over a fourteen-year career, the longest of which was spent at Ulsan Hyundai Mobis Phoebus, who retired his number 10 shirt after his retirement. He was nicknamed "Prince of the Court" (코트의 황태자).

== Early life ==
Woo enjoyed playing baseball and ran track as a child. He started playing basketball when his elementary school started a basketball team and recruited him to join, despite his short stature for his age. From there, he began focusing on basketball and attended Samseon Middle School and Kyungbock High School in Seoul, both known for their basketball teams. He graduated with a degree in law from Yonsei University, unusual for college athletes as the majority studied sports science, physical education or a related major. One of his middle school and high school classmates was future national teammate and best friend Chun Hee-chul.

== Playing career ==
=== College career ===
Woo's time at Yonsei University coincided with what is often retrospectively dubbed the "golden era" of domestic college basketball. He and his teammates, as well as their counterparts from traditional athletic rivals Korea University, enjoyed a level of popularity similar to that of idol singers and A-list actors/actresses due to their skills and good looks. Together with his Yonsei teammates Lee Sang-min and Moon Kyung-eun and Korea University's Hyun Joo-yup and Chun Hee-chul, among others, they were collectively dubbed "Oppa Troupe" (오빠부대) by the media. Woo and his Yonsei teammates drew significant attention after they defeated a Busan Kia team which boasted the senior amateur league's most formidable offensive players, the "Hur-Dong-Taek Trio" (Hur Jae, Kang Dong-hee and Kim Yoo-taek) during the 1993-94 season.

=== Professional career ===
In 1996, Woo was signed by the Incheon-based team of Daewoo Securities, which has since become Daegu KOGAS Pegasus, and is among the last generation of players who began their senior careers during the semi-professional pre-KBL era. He took the National Basketball Festival, then the main basketball competition, by storm on his debut for Daewoo, scoring 24 points in a 78-71 win against Tongyang. In 1998, he and Chun enlisted for mandatory military service and were assigned as public service workers, rather than the Sangmu basketball team. They were discharged ahead of the 1999-2000 season. After five seasons with the Incheon team and no silverware, he signed with Seoul Samsung Thunders.

Woo was signed by Ulsan Hyundai Automons (later renamed Ulsan Hyundai Mobis Phoebus) in 2002. During the 2003-04 season, Woo set the record for the most points scored in a single game in the Korean Basketball League, scoring 70 points against Changwon LG Sakers in March. On the same day Moon Kyung-eun scored 66 points (22 three-pointers) against TG Sambo, ranking second behind Woo. The records came under scrutiny from fans and the media due to the statistical impossibility of such records occurring during a regular professional game unless collusion between players and coaches had taken place and the opposing team intentionally failing to play in a usual competitive manner to allow the respective players to achieve their records. As no evidence was ever presented to support the theory, the records still remain in the KBL's record book, but have been described as "shameful" and "embarrassing" by the media and still regarded as a taboo topic by head coaches and players of the respective teams from the two games. In later years, Moon and Woo have declined to mention the records whenever their career achievements are brought up. After the 2003-04 season, the KBL stopped issuing an award to the top scorer at its annual awards ceremony and only releases the statistics on its official website.

Woo retired at the end of the 2009-10 season. His retirement coincided with that of Lee Sang-min and Moon Kyung-eun, leading the media to dub it the "end of an era". All three players had their jersey numbers retired by their respective clubs. Woo's number 10 jersey was retired by Ulsan Hyundai Mobis Phoebus.

=== National team ===
Woo was part of the team which won the 1997 ABC Championship. He and Chun Hee-chul were supposed to participate in the 1998 Asian Games but the Korean Basketball Association's request was turned down by the government agency overseeing their public service term.

== Post-retirement ==
After retiring, Woo became a commentator for SBS Sports. He has also appeared on various variety programs, mostly with fellow retired basketball players such as Seo Jang-hoon and Hur Jae.

== Filmography ==
=== Television series ===
Year	Title	Role	Notes	Ref.
2013	Reply 1994	a basketball star	Cameo	
2020	She Knows Everything	the Manager		
2025	A Head Coach's Turnover	Coach Woo		

=== Television show ===
Year	Title	Role	Notes	Ref.
2022	The First Business in the World	Contestant		
2023	World's First Merchant	Contestant	Season 2	

== Awards and nominations ==
Name of the award ceremony, year presented, category, nominee of the award, and the result of the nomination
Award ceremony	Year	Category	Nominee / Work	Result	Ref.
Korea Awards Ceremony	2022	Sports Achievement Award	Woo Ji-won	Won	
