= Lee Sang-min (basketball) =

South Korean basketball player

Personal information
- Born: November 11, 1972 (age 54) South Korea
- Listed height: 183 cm (6 ft 0 in)

Career information
- College: Yonsei University
- Playing career: 1994–2010
- Position: Point guard
- Coaching career: 2011–2022

Career history

Playing
- 1995–2007: Hyundai / Daejeon Hyundai Dynat / Daejeon Hyundai Gullivers / Jeonju KCC Egis
- 1995–1997: → Sangmu (military service)
- 2007–2010: Seoul Samsung Thunders

Coaching
- 2012–2014: Seoul Samsung Thunders (coach)
- 2014–2022: Seoul Samsung Thunders (head coach)
- 2023–2025: Busan KCC Egis (coach)
- 2025-: Busan KCC Egis (head coach)

Career highlights
- As player: 3x KBL Championship (1998, 1999, 2004); 3x KBL regular season champion (1998, 1999, 2000); ABA Club Championship (2007); 2x KBL Most Valuable Player Award (1998, 1999); KBL Play-offs MVP (2004); 4x KBL Best 5 (1998, 1999, 2002, 2004); KBL All-Time Legend 12; Jeonju KCC Egis number 11 retired
Medals
Representing South Korea
FIBA Asia Championship
Silver medal – second place	1995 Seoul	Team
Gold medal – first place	1997 Riyadh	Team
Silver medal – second place	1999 Fukouka	Team
Asian Games
Silver medal – second place	1994 Hiroshima	Team
Silver medal – second place	1998 Bangkok	Team
Gold medal – first place	2002 Busan	Team

- Lee Sang-min
- Hangul: 이상민
- Hanja: 李相旼
- RR: I Sangmin
- MR: I Sangmin

Lee Sang-min (born 11 November 1972) is a South Korean retired professional basketball player and basketball coach. He was part of the team at the 1994 Asian Games, 1996 Summer Olympics, 1998 Asian Games and 2002 Asian Games.

== Early years ==
Lee enjoyed playing various sports from a young age and began focusing on basketball in high school. He attended Hongik University High School in Seoul.

== Playing career ==
Lee went on to Yonsei University and graduated with a degree in business. His time at Yonsei coincided with what is often retrospectively dubbed the "golden era" of domestic college basketball. He and his teammates, as well as their counterparts from traditional athletic rivals Korea University, enjoyed a level of popularity similar to that of idol singers and A-list actors/actresses due to their skills and good looks. Together with his Yonsei teammates Moon Kyung-eun and Woo Ji-won and Korea University's Hyun Joo-yup and Chun Hee-chul, among others, they were collectively dubbed "Oppa Troupe" (오빠부대) by the media.

After graduating in February 1995, Lee signed with the Daejeon-based semi-professional team of Hyundai, which was later taken over by its affiliate KCC Corporation and is now Jeonju KCC Egis. Two months later, he chose to enlist for mandatory military service in order to "get it over with" and was assigned to the Sangmu team. While playing for the Sangmu team, he became the first domestic player to score a triple-double. He achieved it during a game against SBS in the National Basketball Festival, then the main basketball competition of the semi-professional era.

By the time Lee was discharged in 1997, the professional league had just been established. He played a pivotal role in Hyundai's dominance, winning the regular season title and KBL Championship in 1998 and 1999. During the early years of the KBL, he formed an offensive triumvirate with forward Choo Seung-gyun and swingman Cho Sung-won, known collectively as the "Lee-Cho-Choo trio"; Choo and Cho were known for their shooting skills and prowess around the perimeter while Lee provided the assists and passes. Later in his career, he developed the defensive facet of his game and gained a reputation as a "dual threat" point guard who contributed both offensively and defensively. By his last season as a player, he had recorded 173 blocks in over 500 games, the highest-ranked guard among domestic players in the category and despite being at least 10 cm shorter than the average forward and center.

Lee retired at the end of the 2009-10 season, along with Woo and Moon. Their jersey numbers were retired by their respective clubs. Lee's number 10 jersey was retired by Jeonju KCC Egis.

=== National team ===
Lee was a member of the gold medal winning team at the 2002 Asian Games. During the semi-final against the Philippines, he attempted a three-pointer in the last minute of the game with the score at 66–68 and scored to win the game 69–68. South Korea won its first gold medal in basketball in twenty years.

== Coaching career ==
Lee returned to Seoul Samsung Thunders in 2012 as a member of the coaching staff. He became head coach ahead of the 2014-15 season.

In January 2022, he announced his resignation and his assistant Lee Kyu-sup was named acting head coach for the remainder of the season. His resignation was announced in light of the team's poor results and two players being charged with drunk driving in the space of nine months.
