= Moon Kyung-eun =

South Korean basketball player

Personal information
- Born: August 27, 1971 (age 55) South Korea
- Listed height: 190 cm (6 ft 3 in)

Career information
- College: Yonsei University
- Playing career: 1994–2010
- Position: Small forward
- Coaching career: 2011–2021

Career history

Playing
- 1994–2001: Samsung Electronics / Suwon Samsung Thunders
- 1995–1997: → Sangmu (military service)
- 2001–2006: Incheon SK Bigs / Incheon E-land
- 2006–2010: Seoul SK Knights

Coaching
- 2011–2021: Seoul SK Knights
- 2025–present: Suwon KT Sonicboom

Career highlights
- As player: KBL Championship (2001); KBL regular season champion (2001); KBL Best 5 (1998, 2002); KBL All-Time Legend 12; Seoul SK Knights number 10 retired; As coach: KBL Championship (2018); KBL regular season champion (2013)

- Moon Kyung-eun
- Hangul: 문경은
- Hanja: 文景垠
- RR: Mun Gyeongeun
- MR: Mun Kyŏngŭn

Moon Kyung-eun (born August 27, 1971) is a former South Korean male professional basketball player and basketball coach. He was part of the team at the 1994 Asian Games, 1996 Summer Olympics, 1998 Asian Games and the 2002 Asian Games. From 2012 to 2021 he was head coach of the Korean Basketball League team, the Seoul SK Knights.

== Early life ==
One of three children, Moon attended Kwangshin Commercial High School (now Kwangshin Broadcasting Arts High School). At that time, the team did not have its own gym to practice in. Undaunted by his circumstances, the teenager would find a court and practice shooting on his own outside of school. The team still managed to achieve impressive results against more notable high school teams and even college teams, thus being dubbed a "dark horse" in Seoul's high school basketball scene during the late 1980s to early 1990s.

== Playing career ==
=== College career ===
Moon was heavily scouted as a high school student and went on to attend Yonsei University. His time at Yonsei coincided with what is often retrospectively dubbed the "golden era" of domestic college basketball. He and his teammates, as well as their counterparts from traditional athletic rivals Korea University, enjoyed a level of popularity similar to that of idol singers and A-list actors/actresses due to their skills and good looks. Together with his Yonsei teammates Lee Sang-min and Woo Ji-won and Korea University's Hyun Joo-yup and Chun Hee-chul, among others, they were collectively dubbed "Oppa Troupe" (오빠부대) by the media. As a college player, Moon became known for his accurate shooting and drew comparisons to his older contemporary shooting guard Hur Jae, despite being a forward.

=== Professional career ===
In 1994, Moon joined the Suwon-based semi-professional team of Samsung Electronics, which famously scouted him and secured a contract with him before graduation. He enlisted for mandatory military service in 1995 and was assigned to the Sangmu team. By the time he was discharged in 1997, the professional league had just been established. Samsung was admitted as a member and Moon and most of his teammates remained with the team. He was an integral part of the Samsung team which won the 2001 KBL Championship.

In 2001, Moon signed with Incheon SK Bigs, now Daegu KOGAS Pegasus, and spent five seasons with the team. During the 2003-04 season, Ulsan Mobis Automons guard Woo Ji-won set the record for the most points scored in a single game in the Korean Basketball League, scoring 70 points against Changwon LG Sakers in March. On the same day, Moon scored 66 points (22 three-pointers) against TG Sambo, ranking second behind Woo. The records came under scrutiny from fans and the media due to the statistical impossibility of such records occurring during a regular professional game unless collusion between players and coaches had taken place and the opposing team intentionally failed to play in a usual competitive manner to allow the respective players to achieve their records. As no evidence was ever presented to support the theory, the records still remain in the KBL's record book, but have been described as "shameful" and "embarrassing" by the media and are still regarded as taboo topic by head coaches and players of the respective teams from the two games. In later years, Moon and Woo have declined to mention the records whenever their career achievements are brought up. After the 2003-04 season, the KBL stopped issuing an award to the top scorer at its annual awards ceremony and only releases the statistics on its official website.

Moon joined Seoul SK Knights in 2006. He retired at the end of the 2009-10 season. The team retired his number 10 jersey. Known for being one of the best three-point shooters during his heyday, he earned the nickname "Rambo Shooter" as he was said to resemble Rambo actor Sylvester Stallone.

== Post-retirement ==
Like many of his contemporaries, Moon went into coaching after retiring as a player. He was appointed head coach of the Seoul SK Knights ahead of the 2012-13 season and led them to the KBL Championship five years later. His success made him one of the few head coaches to have won the KBL Championship as both a player and a head coach. His former assistant and long-time national team and club teammate Chun Hee-chul took over from the 2021–22 season as Moon was assigned to a technical advisor role with the Knights. After a period of time spent as a KBL commentator, he returned to coaching and was named head coach of Suwon KT Sonicboom for the upcoming 2025-26 season.

Since 2021, Moon has appeared in several variety shows alongside fellow retired basketball players such as Hyun Joo-yup, Hur Jae and Woo Ji-won. He and Hyun are the main cast members of the JTBC basketball-themed program Witch Fitness Basketball Club (also known as Jump Like A Witch), in which the duo try to teach female celebrities without any athletic background how to play basketball.

== Personal life ==
Moon has been married since 1998. He and his wife, a fellow Yonsei alumnus, have a daughter named Moon Jin-won.

== Filmography ==
=== Television shows ===
Year	Title	Role	Eps	Channel	Ref.
2009	Global fish-shaped bun (글로벌 봉어빵)	Guest with his Daughter	13, 15, & 17	SBS	
2009	Good day (기분좋은 날)	Guest with Park Jun-gyu	535	MBC	
2011	Good morning (좋은아침)	Guest	3703, 4032	SBS	
2014	Running Man (TV program) 런닝맨	Short Cameo (Guest)	210	SBS	
2021	Basketball (뭉쳐야 쏜다)	Guest Coach & Player	6, 22, 23, & 24	JTBC	
2021	Buddy into the Wild (안싸우면 다행이야)	Guest	58, 59, 66, 67,80, 81, 100 &101	MBC	
2022	Legend Festival (전설체전)	Cast	1 - 4	JTBC	
2022	Jump Like a Witch (마녀체력 농구부)	Director	1 - 14	JTBC	
2022	Hole-in-One (전설끼리 홀인원)	Cast Member	1 - 8	MBC	
2022	The First Business in the World (천하제일장사)	Contestant	1 - 11	Channel A	
2022	Boss in the Mirror (사장님 귀는 당나귀 귀)	Guest	176-177	KBS	
2023	Attack on Sisters (진격의언니들)	Guest	7	Channel S	
2023	Same Bed, Different Dreams 2: You Are My Destiny (동상이몽2)	Guest	297	SBS	

== See also ==
- Jung Jae-Hong
