= 2017 FIBA Asia Cup squads =

The following are the squads for the 2017 FIBA Asia Cup.

== Group A ==
=== India ===
India men's national basketball team – 2017 FIBA Asia Cup roster
Players
Coaches

| Pos. | No. | Name | Age – Date of birth | Height | Club | Ctr. |
|---|---|---|---|---|---|---|
| PF | 6 | Aravind Annadurai | 24 – July 5, 1993 | 2.00 m (6 ft 7 in) | Indian overseas bank | (India) |
| G | 7 | Anil Kumar | 28 – July 31, 1989 | 1.86 m (6 ft 1 in) | Vijaya Bank Bangalore | (India) |
| G | 8 | Rajvir Singh | 21 – October 25, 1995 | 1.88 m (6 ft 2 in) | Punjab Police | (India) |
| G | 9 | Vishesh Bhriguvanshi | 25 – September 13, 1991 | 1.92 m (6 ft 4 in) | Adelaide 36ers | (Australia) |
| C | 10 | Amritpal Singh | 26 – January 5, 1991 | 2.10 m (6 ft 11 in) | Pune Peshwas | (India) |
| C | 15 | Rikin Pethani | 26 – December 2, 1990 | 2.03 m (6 ft 8 in) | Income Tax Chennai | (India) |
| F | 22 | Amjyot Singh | 25 – January 27, 1992 | 2.03 m (6 ft 8 in) | Punjab Police | (India) |
| PG | 24 | Baladhaneshwar Poiyamozhi | 17 – December 7, 1999 | 1.79 m (5 ft 10 in) | Indian overseas bank | (India) |
| G | 46 | Prasanna Sivakumar | 24 – September 25, 1992 | 1.86 m (6 ft 1 in) | Indian overseas bank | (India) |
| C | 52 | Satnam Singh Bhamara | 21 – December 10, 1995 | 2.18 m (7 ft 2 in) | Texas Legends | (United States) |
| F | 77 | Muin Bek Hafeez | 21 – March 16, 1996 | 1.90 m (6 ft 3 in) | Indian overseas bank | (India) |
| PG | 99 | Talwinderjit Singh | 30 – October 20, 1986 | 1.83 m (6 ft 0 in) | | (India) |

Head coach

- (United States) Philip John Weber

Assistant coach(es)

- (United States) Steven Philip John Klei
- (India) Sebastian Padipurakkal Joseph
- (India) Baskar Sappaniambalam

Legend

- (C) Team captain
- (NP) Naturalized player
- Club – describes last
  club before the tournament
- Age – describes age
  on 8 August 2017

=== Iran ===
Iran men's national basketball team – 2017 FIBA Asia Cup roster
Players
Coaches

| Pos. | No. | Name | Age – Date of birth | Height | Club | Ctr. |
|---|---|---|---|---|---|---|
| C | 4 | Meisam Mirzaeitalarposhti | 25 – April 15, 1992 | 2.10 m (6 ft 11 in) | | (Iran) |
| PG | 5 | Sajjad Mashayekhi | 23 – February 23, 1994 | 1.80 m (5 ft 11 in) | Naft Abadan | (Iran) |
| PG | 6 | Farid Aslani | 29 – July 4, 1988 | 1.83 m (6 ft 0 in) | Naft Abadan | (Iran) |
| SG | 7 | Navid Rezaeifar | 20 – August 23, 1996 | 1.91 m (6 ft 3 in) | Mahram | (Iran) |
| SG | 8 | Behnam Yakhchali | 22 – July 12, 1995 | 1.95 m (6 ft 5 in) | Petrochimi | (Iran) |
| SF | 9 | Vahid Dalirzahan | 22 – March 28, 1995 | 1.98 m (6 ft 6 in) | Army | (Iran) |
| PF | 10 | Navid Niktash | 26 – January 17, 1991 | 2.03 m (6 ft 8 in) | London Lions | (United Kingdom) |
| PF | 11 | Oshin Sahakian | 31 – March 21, 1986 | 2.00 m (6 ft 7 in) | Petrochimi | (Iran) |
| C | 12 | Rouzbeh Arghavan | 29 – May 18, 1988 | 2.14 m (7 ft 0 in) | Petrochimi | (Iran) |
| SF | 13 | Mohammad Jamshidi | 26 – July 30, 1991 | 1.98 m (6 ft 6 in) | Petrochimi | (Iran) |
| PF | 14 | Arsalan Kazemi | 27 – April 22, 1990 | 1.99 m (6 ft 6 in) | Army | (Iran) |
| C | 15 | Hamed Haddadi | 32 – May 19, 1985 | 2.18 m (7 ft 2 in) | Petrochimi | (Iran) |

Head coach

- (Iran) Mehran Hatami

Legend

- (C) Team captain
- (NP) Naturalized player
- Club – describes last
  club before the tournament
- Age – describes age
  on 8 August 2017

=== Jordan ===
Jordan men's national basketball team – 2017 FIBA Asia Cup roster
Players
Coaches

| Pos. | No. | Name | Age – Date of birth | Height | Club | Ctr. |
|---|---|---|---|---|---|---|
| G | 0 | Mah'd Abdeen | 29 – December 23, 1987 | 1.90 m (6 ft 3 in) | Al Awdah | (Jordan) |
| G | 1 | Amin Abu Hawwas | 23 – April 26, 1994 | 1.88 m (6 ft 2 in) | Al Riyadi Amman | (Jordan) |
| SG | 5 | Sami Bzai | 23 – January 26, 1994 | 1.85 m (6 ft 1 in) |
| F | 7 | Ahmad Al-Hamarsheh | 30 – October 10, 1986 | 1.97 m (6 ft 6 in) | Al Riyadi Amman | (Jordan) |
| PG | 10 | Sinan Eid | 25 – October 23, 1991 | 1.85 m (6 ft 1 in) | | (Turkey) |
| F | 12 | Yousef Abuwazaneh | 23 – December 6, 1993 | 2.01 m (6 ft 7 in) | Orthodox | (Jordan) |
| C | 13 | Mohammad Shaher | 27 – March 3, 1990 | 2.08 m (6 ft 10 in) | Al Fateh | (Morocco) |
| PF | 20 | Ahmad Obeid | 26 – August 24, 1990 | 1.99 m (6 ft 6 in) | Al Riyadi Amman | (Jordan) |
| G | 22 | Malek Kanaan | 24 – February 7, 1993 | 1.76 m (5 ft 9 in) | Al Awdah | (Jordan) |
| G | 23 | Mousa Al-Awadi | 32 – July 20, 1985 | 1.87 m (6 ft 2 in) |
| F | 41 | Ali Jamal Zaghab | 29 – June 3, 1988 | 2.05 m (6 ft 9 in) | Al Awdah | (Jordan) |

Head coach

- (Jordan) Sam Daghles

Assistant coach(es)

- (Jordan) Faisal Ali Yousef Ensour

Legend

- (C) Team captain
- (NP) Naturalized player
- Club – describes last
  club before the tournament
- Age – describes age
  on 8 August 2017

=== Syria ===
Syria men's national basketball team – 2017 FIBA Asia Cup roster
Players
Coaches

| Pos. | No. | Name | Age – Date of birth | Height | Club | Ctr. |
|---|---|---|---|---|---|---|
| PG | 4 | William Al-Haddad | 30 – July 5, 1987 | 1.85 m (6 ft 1 in) |
| PG | 5 | Sharif Al-Osh | 29 – March 14, 1988 | 1.79 m (5 ft 10 in) |
| SG | 6 | Michel Madanly | 36 – March 10, 1981 | 1.92 m (6 ft 4 in) | Landslake Lions | (Netherlands) |
| SF | 7 | Khalel Khori | 19 – June 6, 1998 | 1.95 m (6 ft 5 in) |
| SF | 8 | Al Hakam Abd Allah | 35 – January 1, 1982 | 1.99 m (6 ft 6 in) |
| SG | 9 | Tarek Al-Jabi | 27 – August 2, 1990 | 1.84 m (6 ft 0 in) |
| SF | 10 | Anthouny Bakar | 23 – January 10, 1994 | 1.97 m (6 ft 6 in) |
| PF | 11 | Jamil Saddir | 28 – January 13, 1989 | 2.00 m (6 ft 7 in) |
| PF | 12 | Omar Cheikh Ali | 26 – January 1, 1991 | 2.04 m (6 ft 8 in) |
| C | 13 | Abdulwahab Al-Hamwi | 27 – June 15, 1990 | 2.18 m (7 ft 2 in) |
| C | 14 | Ivan Todorović (NP) | 33 – January 17, 1984 | 2.14 m (7 ft 0 in) |
| PF | 15 | Hani Adribe | 26 – October 4, 1990 | 2.05 m (6 ft 9 in) |

Head coach

- (Serbia) Nenad Krdzic

Assistant coach(es)

- (Syria) Hadi Haj Darwish

Legend

- (C) Team captain
- (NP) Naturalized player
- Club – describes last
  club before the tournament
- Age – describes age
  on 8 August 2017

== Group B ==
=== China ===
China men's national basketball team – 2017 FIBA Asia Cup roster
Players
Coaches

| Pos. | No. | Name | Age – Date of birth | Height | Club | Ctr. |
|---|---|---|---|---|---|---|
| PG | 5 | Liu Xiaoyu | 28 – March 14, 1989 | 1.91 m (6 ft 3 in) | Beijing Ducks | (China) |
| PG | 6 | Guo Ailun | 23 – November 14, 1993 | 1.92 m (6 ft 4 in) | Liaoning Flying Leopards | (China) |
| SF | 9 | Gu Quan | 25 – April 2, 1992 | 2.01 m (6 ft 7 in) | Shenzhen Leopards | (China) |
| SF | 10 | Zhou Peng (C) | 27 – October 11, 1989 | 2.06 m (6 ft 9 in) | Guangdong Southern Tigers | (China) |
| SF | 12 | Li Gen | 28 – August 15, 1988 | 1.96 m (6 ft 5 in) | Xinjiang Flying Tigers | (China) |
| C | 16 | Li Muhao | 25 – June 2, 1992 | 2.18 m (7 ft 2 in) | Shenzhen Leopards | (China) |
| G | 19 | Yu Dehao | 22 – April 10, 1995 | 1.90 m (6 ft 3 in) | Shenzhen Leopards | (China) |
| PF | 20 | Ren Junfei | 27 – February 4, 1990 | 2.04 m (6 ft 8 in) | Guangdong Southern Tigers | (China) |
| PF | 21 | Hu Jinqiu | 19 – September 24, 1997 | 2.10 m (6 ft 11 in) | Zhejiang Lions | (China) |
| SG | 24 | Zeng Lingxu | 30 – April 12, 1987 | 1.94 m (6 ft 4 in) | Shanxi Brave Dragons | (China) |
| SG | 33 | Wu Qian | 23 – July 7, 1994 | 1.91 m (6 ft 3 in) | Zhejiang Golden Bulls | (China) |
| C | 55 | Han Dejun | 30 – May 10, 1987 | 2.15 m (7 ft 1 in) | Liaoning Flying Leopards | (China) |

Head coach

- (China) Du Feng

Assistant coach(es)

- (China) Shi Rong
- (China) Yang Wenhai
- (China) Zhang Boyu

Legend

- (C) Team captain
- (NP) Naturalized player
- Club – describes last
  club before the tournament
- Age – describes age
  on 8 August 2017

=== Iraq ===
Iraq men's national basketball team – 2017 FIBA Asia Cup roster
Players
Coaches

| Pos. | No. | Name | Age – Date of birth | Height | Club | Ctr. |
|---|---|---|---|---|---|---|
| SG | 4 | Karrar Hamzah | 25 – October 19, 1991 | 1.90 m (6 ft 3 in) | Al Kahraba | (Iraq) |
| PG | 6 | Ali Aljuboori | 30 – April 9, 1987 | 1.75 m (5 ft 9 in) | Al-Mina'a | (Iraq) |
| SG | 7 | Hassan Abdullah | 25 – February 4, 1992 | 1.90 m (6 ft 3 in) | Al Kahraba | (Iraq) |
| PG | 8 | Omar Alazawi | 29 – May 12, 1988 | 1.88 m (6 ft 2 in) | Al Karkh | (Iraq) |
| G | 9 | Kevin Galloway (NP) | 29 – May 23, 1988 | 2.00 m (6 ft 7 in) | Homenetmen Beirut | (Lebanon) |
| SF | 10 | Ali Hamad | 31 – May 27, 1986 | 1.94 m (6 ft 4 in) | Al Nift | (Iraq) |
| PF | 11 | Nawres Dhafer | 23 – July 17, 1994 | 2.02 m (6 ft 8 in) | Al Shorta | (Iraq) |
| PF | 12 | Hussein Talib | 27 – June 1, 1990 | 1.98 m (6 ft 6 in) | Naft Al-Janoob | (Iraq) |
| C | 13 | Ali Hameed | 33 – April 26, 1984 | 2.09 m (6 ft 10 in) | Al-Mina'a | (Iraq) |
| C | 14 | Hussein Hasan Algburi | 32 – October 2, 1984 | 2.06 m (6 ft 9 in) | Free Agent |
| C | 15 | Mohammed Al-Khafaji | 26 – July 9, 1991 | 2.06 m (6 ft 9 in) | Al Shorta | (Iraq) |
| SF | 24 | Ali Ismael | 27 – August 13, 1989 | 2.00 m (6 ft 7 in) | Al Shorta | (Iraq) |

Head coach

- (Turkey) Mustafa Derin

Assistant coach(es)

- (Iraq) Atilla Celebi

Legend

- (C) Team captain
- (NP) Naturalized player
- Club – describes last
  club before the tournament
- Age – describes age
  on 8 August 2017

=== Philippines ===
Philippines men's national basketball team – 2017 FIBA Asia Cup roster
Players
Coaches

| Pos. | No. | Name | Age – Date of birth | Height | Club | Ctr. |
|---|---|---|---|---|---|---|
| PG | 2 | Terrence Romeo | 25 – March 16, 1992 | 1.83 m (6 ft 0 in) | GlobalPort Batang Pier | (Philippines) |
| SF | 4 | Carl Bryan Cruz | 25 – August 21, 1991 | 1.96 m (6 ft 5 in) | Alaska Aces | (Philippines) |
| G/F | 5 | Gabe Norwood (C) | 32 – February 9, 1985 | 1.98 m (6 ft 6 in) | Rain or Shine Elasto Painters | (Philippines) |
| PG | 6 | Jio Jalalon | 25 – August 2, 1992 | 1.72 m (5 ft 8 in) | Star Hotshots | (Philippines) |
| PG | 7 | Jayson William | 31 – June 30, 1986 | 1.80 m (5 ft 11 in) | TNT KaTropa | (Philippines) |
| F | 8 | Calvin Abueva | 29 – February 4, 1988 | 1.88 m (6 ft 2 in) | Alaska Aces | (Philippines) |
| C | 15 | June Mar Fajardo | 27 – November 17, 1989 | 2.11 m (6 ft 11 in) | San Miguel Beermen | (Philippines) |
| SG | 16 | Roger Pogoy | 25 – June 16, 1992 | 1.91 m (6 ft 3 in) | TNT KaTropa | (Philippines) |
| F/C | 20 | Raymond Almazan | 28 – August 2, 1989 | 2.06 m (6 ft 9 in) | Rain or Shine Elasto Painters | (Philippines) |
| F/C | 25 | Japeth Aguilar | 30 – January 25, 1987 | 2.08 m (6 ft 10 in) | Barangay Ginebra San Miguel | (Philippines) |
| PF | 34 | Christian Standhardinger (NP) | 28 – July 4, 1989 | 2.03 m (6 ft 8 in) | SC Rasta Vechta | (Germany) |
| G/F | 35 | Matthew Wright | 26 – February 7, 1991 | 1.93 m (6 ft 4 in) | Phoenix Fuel Masters | (Philippines) |

Head coach

- (Philippines) Chot Reyes

Assistant coach(es)

- (Philippines) Joshua Vincent Reyes
- (Philippines) Jem Ryn Betia

Team manager

- (Philippines) Butch Antonio

Legend

- (C) Team captain
- (NP) Naturalized player
- Club – describes last
  club before the tournament
- Age – describes age
  on 8 August 2017

=== Qatar ===
Qatar men's national basketball team – 2017 FIBA Asia Cup roster
Players
Coaches

| Pos. | No. | Name | Age – Date of birth | Height | Club | Ctr. |
|---|---|---|---|---|---|---|
| SG | 4 | Abdulrahman Saad | 21 – July 2, 1996 | 1.85 m (6 ft 1 in) | Al Gharafa Doha | (Qatar) |
| G/F | 5 | Ahmad Al-Darwish | 27 – April 12, 1990 | 1.89 m (6 ft 2 in) | Al-Wakrah | (Qatar) |
| PG | 6 | Mansour El Hadary | 27 – April 12, 1990 | 1.77 m (5 ft 10 in) | El Jaish | (Qatar) |
| G/F | 9 | Hassan Mohamed | 26 – August 3, 1991 | 1.91 m (6 ft 3 in) | Al Rayyan Doha | (Qatar) |
| G | 10 | Abdulrahman Al-Muftah | 22 – October 30, 1994 | 1.81 m (5 ft 11 in) | Al-Ahli | (Qatar) |
| PF | 11 | Erfan Ali | 33 – December 20, 1983 | 1.98 m (6 ft 6 in) | El Jaish | (Qatar) |
| PF | 12 | Abdelrahman Abdelhaleem | 21 – June 26, 1996 | 2.05 m (6 ft 9 in) | Al Rayyan Doha | (Qatar) |
| F/C | 13 | Mohammed Yousuf | 34 – September 9, 1982 | 2.04 m (6 ft 8 in) | El Jaish | (Qatar) |
| C | 15 | Omer Abdelqader | 33 – October 1, 1983 | 2.07 m (6 ft 9 in) | Al Gharafa Doha | (Qatar) |
| PG | 16 | Mohamed Abdelaziz | 21 – November 23, 1995 | 1.79 m (5 ft 10 in) | Al Rayyan Doha | (Qatar) |
| C | 42 | Nasser Al-Rayes | 22 – September 6, 1994 | 2.08 m (6 ft 10 in) | Caltech Beavers | (United States) |

Head coach

- (Iraq) Kousay Hatem Khalaf

Assistant coach(es)

- (Egypt) Yaser Abdelrehim Abdelwahab Mohamed

Legend

- (C) Team captain
- (NP) Naturalized player
- Club – describes last
  club before the tournament
- Age – describes age
  on 8 August 2017

== Group C ==
=== Kazakhstan ===
Kazakhstan men's national basketball team – 2017 FIBA Asia Cup roster
Players
Coaches

| Pos. | No. | Name | Age – Date of birth | Height | Club | Ctr. |
|---|---|---|---|---|---|---|
| PF | 1 | Denis Degtyarev | 26 – October 5, 1990 | 2.00 m (6 ft 7 in) | BC Astana | (Kazakhstan) |
| G | 2 | Azim Yagodkin | 25 – February 21, 1992 | 1.83 m (6 ft 0 in) | BC Caspiy Aktau | (Kazakhstan) |
| SF | 5 | Roman Marchuk | 24 – March 4, 1993 | 1.96 m (6 ft 5 in) | BC Caspiy Aktau | (Kazakhstan) |
| G | 6 | Rustam Murzagaliev | 25 – May 24, 1992 | 1.96 m (6 ft 5 in) | BC Astana | (Kazakhstan) |
| SF | 7 | Nikolay Bazhkin | 26 – December 9, 1990 | 1.96 m (6 ft 5 in) | BC Barsy Atyrau | (Kazakhstan) |
| SG | 9 | Pavel Ilin | 25 – May 24, 1992 | 1.94 m (6 ft 4 in) | BC Barsy Atyrau | (Kazakhstan) |
| SG | 10 | Vassiliy Savchenko | 30 – June 13, 1987 | 1.90 m (6 ft 3 in) | BC Barsy Atyrau | (Kazakhstan) |
| PF | 11 | Anton Ponomarev | 28 – October 31, 1988 | 2.09 m (6 ft 10 in) | BC Astana | (Kazakhstan) |
| SG | 13 | Rustam Yargaliyev | 30 – December 20, 1986 | 1.93 m (6 ft 4 in) | BC Astana | (Kazakhstan) |
| C | 15 | Mikhail Yevstigneyev | 33 – July 5, 1984 | 2.00 m (6 ft 7 in) | BC Barsy Atyrau | (Kazakhstan) |
| C | 17 | Alexander Zhigulin | 23 – April 26, 1994 | 2.05 m (6 ft 9 in) | BC Astana | (Kazakhstan) |
| SF | 25 | Maxim Marchuk | 23 – January 17, 1994 | 1.94 m (6 ft 4 in) | BC Astana | (Kazakhstan) |

Head coach

- (Ukraine) Eduard Skrypets

Legend

- (C) Team captain
- (NP) Naturalized player
- Club – describes last
  club before the tournament
- Age – describes age
  on 8 August 2017

=== Lebanon ===
Lebanon men's national basketball team – 2017 FIBA Asia Cup roster
Players
Coaches

| Pos. | No. | Name | Age – Date of birth | Height | Club | Ctr. |
|---|---|---|---|---|---|---|
| G | 5 | Amir Saoud | 26 – 18 January 1991 | 1.88 m (6 ft 2 in) | Al Riyadi Beirut | (Lebanon) |
| G | 1 | Nadim Souaid | 30 – 20 August 1986 | 1.93 m (6 ft 4 in) | Sagesse | (Lebanon) |
| G/F | 4 | Jean Abdelnour | 33 – 29 November 1983 | 2.01 m (6 ft 7 in) | Al Riyadi Beirut | (Lebanon) |
| PG | 25 | Ali Mezher | 23 – 22 March 1994 | 1.83 m (6 ft 0 in) | Hoops Club | (Lebanon) |
| PG | 12 | Joseph Chartouny | 23 – 16 December 1993 | 1.93 m (6 ft 4 in) | Fordham Rams | (United States) |
| PF | 13 | Bassel Bawji | 27 – 26 December 1989 | 2.03 m (6 ft 8 in) | Champville | (Lebanon) |
| C | 9 | Charles Tabet | 30 – 1 July 1987 | 2.05 m (6 ft 9 in) | Al Mouttahed Tripoli | (Lebanon) |
| PG | 7 | Wael Arakji | 22 – 4 September 1994 | 1.93 m (6 ft 4 in) | Al Riyadi Beirut | (Lebanon) |
| PF | 11 | Ali Haidar | 27 – 20 July 1990 | 2.01 m (6 ft 7 in) | Al Riyadi Beirut | (Lebanon) |
| SF | 8 | Elie Rustom | 30 – 2 May 1987 | 1.96 m (6 ft 5 in) | Al Mouttahed Tripoli | (Lebanon) |
| C | 14 | Norvel Pelle (NP) | 24 – 3 February 1993 | 2.11 m (6 ft 11 in) | Pallacanestro Varese | (Italy) |
| SF | 15 | Fadi El Khatib | 37 – 18 December 1979 | 1.98 m (6 ft 6 in) | Champville | (Lebanon) |

Head coach

- (Lithuania) Ramūnas Butautas

Assistant coach(es)

- (Lebanon) Patrick Saba

Legend

- (C) Team captain
- (NP) Naturalized player
- Club – describes last
  club before the tournament
- Age – describes age
  on 8 August 2017

=== New Zealand ===
New Zealand men's national basketball team – 2017 FIBA Asia Cup roster
Players
Coaches

| Pos. | No. | Name | Age – Date of birth | Height | Club | Ctr. |
|---|---|---|---|---|---|---|
| G/F | 0 | Reuben Te Rangi (C) | 22 – October 14, 1994 | 1.98 m (6 ft 6 in) | Brisbane Bullets | (Australia) |
| SG | 1 | Luke Aston | 27 – June 28, 1990 | 2.01 m (6 ft 7 in) | Southland Sharks | (New Zealand) |
| PG | 2 | Isaac Letoa | 19 – August 2, 1998 | 1.83 m (6 ft 0 in) | Wellington Saints | (New Zealand) |
| F | 3 | Finn Delany | 21 – August 12, 1995 | 2.00 m (6 ft 7 in) | New Zealand Breakers | (New Zealand) |
| PG | 8 | Derone Raukawa | 23 – July 24, 1994 | 1.81 m (5 ft 11 in) | Southland Sharks | (New Zealand) |
| F/C | 13 | James Hunter | 26 – June 19, 1991 | 2.08 m (6 ft 10 in) | New Zealand Breakers | (New Zealand) |
| F | 15 | Dyson King-Hawea | 24 – October 15, 1992 | 1.98 m (6 ft 6 in) | Nunawading Spectres | (Australia) |
| PF | 16 | Tohiraukura Smith-Milner | 21 – October 6, 1995 | 2.05 m (6 ft 9 in) | Melbourne United | (Australia) |
| G/F | 20 | Jordan Ngatai | 24 – March 7, 1993 | 1.95 m (6 ft 5 in) | Wellington Saints | (New Zealand) |
| SG | 25 | Ethan Rusbatch | 25 – May 24, 1992 | 1.96 m (6 ft 5 in) | Canterbury Rams | (New Zealand) |
| C | 33 | Sam Timmins | 20 – May 23, 1997 | 2.10 m (6 ft 11 in) | Washington Huskies | (United States) |
| PG | 55 | Shea Ili | 24 – October 6, 1992 | 1.83 m (6 ft 0 in) | New Zealand Breakers | (New Zealand) |

Head coach

- (New Zealand) Paul Henare

Assistant coach(es)

- (New Zealand) Pero Cameron
- (New Zealand) Ross McMains

Technical consultant

- (Serbia) Nenad Vučinić

Legend

- (C) Team captain
- (NP) Naturalized player
- Club – describes last
  club before the tournament
- Age – describes age
  on 8 August 2017

=== South Korea ===
South Korea men's national basketball team – 2017 FIBA Asia Cup roster
Players
Coaches

| Pos. | No. | Name | Age – Date of birth | Height | Club | Ctr. |
|---|---|---|---|---|---|---|
| G | 1 | Park Chan-hee | 30 – April 17, 1987 | 1.90 m (6 ft 3 in) | Incheon Electroland Elephants | (South Korea) |
| G | 2 | Choi Jun-yong | 23 – April 4, 1994 | 2.00 m (6 ft 7 in) | Seoul SK Knights | (South Korea) |
| F | 3 | Lee Jung-hyun | 30 – March 3, 1987 | 1.91 m (6 ft 3 in) | Anyang KGC | (South Korea) |
| G | 6 | Heo Ung | 24 – August 5, 1993 | 1.86 m (6 ft 1 in) | Wonju Dongbu Promy | (South Korea) |
| G | 9 | Kim Sun-hyung | 29 – July 1, 1988 | 1.87 m (6 ft 2 in) | Seoul SK Knights | (South Korea) |
| F | 13 | Lim Dong-seob | 26 – August 29, 1990 | 1.98 m (6 ft 6 in) | Seoul Samsung Thunders | (South Korea) |
| C | 15 | Kim Jong-kyu | 26 – July 3, 1991 | 2.06 m (6 ft 9 in) | Changwon LG Sakers | (South Korea) |
| F | 17 | Jeon Jun-beom | 25 – August 27, 1991 | 1.94 m (6 ft 4 in) | Ulsan Mobis Phoebus | (South Korea) |
| F | 21 | Yang Hong-seok | 20 – July 2, 1997 | 1.99 m (6 ft 6 in) | Chung-Ang University | (South Korea) |
| C | 32 | Lee Jong-hyun | 23 – February 5, 1994 | 2.03 m (6 ft 8 in) | Ulsan Mobis Phoebus | (South Korea) |
| C | 33 | Lee Seung-hyun | 25 – April 16, 1992 | 1.97 m (6 ft 6 in) | Goyang Orion Orions | (South Korea) |
| C | 41 | Oh Se-keun | 30 – May 20, 1987 | 2.00 m (6 ft 7 in) | Anyang KGC | (South Korea) |

Head coach

- (South Korea) Hur Jae

Assistant coach(es)

- (South Korea) Kim Sang-shik

Legend

- (C) Team captain
- (NP) Naturalized player
- Club – describes last
  club before the tournament
- Age – describes age
  on 8 August 2017

== Group D ==
=== Australia ===
Australia men's national basketball team – 2017 FIBA Asia Cup roster
Players
Coaches

| Pos. | No. | Name | Age – Date of birth | Height | Club | Ctr. |
|---|---|---|---|---|---|---|
| SG | 4 | Cameron Gliddon | 27 – August 16, 1989 | 1.96 m (6 ft 5 in) | Cairns Taipans | (Australia) |
| PG | 5 | Jason Cadee | 26 – April 15, 1991 | 1.87 m (6 ft 2 in) | Sydney Kings | (Australia) |
| PG | 6 | Mitch Norton | 24 – April 1, 1993 | 1.86 m (6 ft 1 in) | Illawarra Hawks | (Australia) |
| G/F | 7 | Mitch Creek | 25 – April 27, 1992 | 1.98 m (6 ft 6 in) | Adelaide 36ers | (Australia) |
| SF | 8 | Brad Newley | 32 – February 18, 1985 | 1.98 m (6 ft 6 in) | Sydney Kings | (Australia) |
| SG | 9 | Mitch McCarron | 25 – June 30, 1992 | 1.89 m (6 ft 2 in) | Cairns Taipans | (Australia) |
| SF | 10 | Todd Blanchfield | 25 – November 7, 1991 | 1.98 m (6 ft 6 in) | Sydney Kings | (Australia) |
| PF | 11 | Nick Kay | 25 – August 3, 1992 | 2.06 m (6 ft 9 in) | Illawarra Hawks | (Australia) |
| PF | 12 | Daniel Kickert | 34 – May 29, 1983 | 2.08 m (6 ft 10 in) | Brisbane Bullets | (Australia) |
| F/C | 13 | David Andersen | 37 – June 23, 1980 | 2.12 m (6 ft 11 in) | Melbourne United | (Australia) |
| C | 14 | Angus Brandt | 27 – October 26, 1989 | 2.08 m (6 ft 10 in) | Perth Wildcats | (Australia) |
| C | 15 | Matt Hodgson | 26 – August 2, 1991 | 2.11 m (6 ft 11 in) | Adelaide 36ers | (Australia) |

Head coach

- (Australia) Andrej Lemanis

Assistant coach(es)

- (Australia) Luc Longley
- (Australia) Adam Caporn

Legend

- (C) Team captain
- (NP) Naturalized player
- Club – describes last
  club before the tournament
- Age – describes age
  on 8 August 2017

=== Chinese Taipei ===
Chinese Taipei men's national basketball team – 2017 FIBA Asia Cup roster
Players
Coaches

| Pos. | No. | Name | Age – Date of birth | Height | Club | Ctr. |
|---|---|---|---|---|---|---|
| C | 4 | Lin Chih-wei | 25 – July 10, 1992 | 2.00 m (6 ft 7 in) | Fubon Braves | (Chinese Taipei) |
| F | 5 | Liu Cheng | 26 – November 24, 1990 | 1.92 m (6 ft 4 in) | Zhejiang Lions | (China) |
| F | 6 | Chou Yi-hsiang | 26 – February 4, 1991 | 1.90 m (6 ft 3 in) | Jiangsu Monkey King | (China) |
| G | 7 | Yu Huan-ya | 23 – November 30, 1993 | 1.83 m (6 ft 0 in) | Taiwan Beer | (Chinese Taipei) |
| F | 8 | Chou Po-chen | 27 – August 8, 1990 | 1.98 m (6 ft 6 in) | Yulon Luxgen Dinos | (Chinese Taipei) |
| F | 10 | Hu Long-mao | 24 – December 22, 1992 | 1.96 m (6 ft 5 in) | Fujian Sturgeons | (China) |
| F | 13 | Lu Cheng-ju | 31 – April 13, 1986 | 1.94 m (6 ft 4 in) | Yulon Luxgen Dinos | (Chinese Taipei) |
| G | 14 | Chiang Yu-an | 26 – August 4, 1991 | 1.74 m (5 ft 9 in) | Taiwan Beer | (Chinese Taipei) |
| F | 20 | Chou Po-hsun | 26 – March 6, 1991 | 1.97 m (6 ft 6 in) | Taiwan Beer | (Chinese Taipei) |
| G | 21 | Cheng Li-huan | 29 – March 5, 1988 | 1.89 m (6 ft 2 in) | Bank of Taiwan | (Chinese Taipei) |
| C | 28 | Wu Hung-hsing | 27 – October 21, 1989 | 2.02 m (6 ft 8 in) | Pauian Archiland | (Chinese Taipei) |
| C | 54 | Wu Tai-hao | 32 – February 7, 1985 | 2.03 m (6 ft 8 in) | Pauian Archiland | (Chinese Taipei) |

Head coach

- (Chinese Taipei) Chou Chun-san

Assistant coach(es)

- (Chinese Taipei) Yen Hsing-su
- (Chinese Taipei) Chiu Chi-yi

Legend

- (C) Team captain
- (NP) Naturalized player
- Club – describes last
  club before the tournament
- Age – describes age
  on 8 August 2017

=== Hong Kong ===
Hong Kong men's national basketball team – 2017 FIBA Asia Cup roster
Players
Coaches

| Pos. | No. | Name | Age – Date of birth | Height | Club | Ctr. |
|---|---|---|---|---|---|---|
| SG | 4 | Ko Wing Sang | 32 – March 28, 1985 | 1.79 m (5 ft 10 in) | Eagles | (Hong Kong) |
| PG | 5 | Lo Yi Ting | 29 – November 14, 1987 | 1.78 m (5 ft 10 in) | South China | (Hong Kong) |
| PG | 6 | Au Yeung Wai Kong | 28 – February 7, 1989 | 1.83 m (6 ft 0 in) | Fukien | (Hong Kong) |
| SG | 7 | Lee Ki | 29 – October 16, 1987 | 1.80 m (5 ft 11 in) | Eastern | (Hong Kong) |
| SG | 8 | Chan Siu Wing | 25 – April 26, 1992 | 1.80 m (5 ft 11 in) | Eastern | (Hong Kong) |
| F | 9 | Adam Xu | 24 – February 16, 1993 | 1.94 m (6 ft 4 in) | Winling | (Hong Kong) |
| F | 10 | Lin Ho Chun | 26 – October 21, 1990 | 1.86 m (6 ft 1 in) | South China | (Hong Kong) |
| C | 11 | Wong Yau Tin | 30 – March 31, 1987 | 1.96 m (6 ft 5 in) | Fukien | (Hong Kong) |
| PF | 12 | Fong Shing Yee | 33 – December 12, 1983 | 1.96 m (6 ft 5 in) | Eastern | (Hong Kong) |
| PF | 13 | Wong Chun Wai | 32 – June 16, 1985 | 1.98 m (6 ft 6 in) | Winling | (Hong Kong) |
| C | 14 | Duncan Reid | 27 – September 28, 1989 | 2.06 m (6 ft 9 in) | Zhejiang Golden Bulls | (China) |
| SG | 15 | Chow Ka Kui | 29 – January 7, 1988 | 1.81 m (5 ft 11 in) | Fukien | (Hong Kong) |

Head coach

- (Hong Kong) On Hing King

Assistant coach(es)

- (Hong Kong) Chiu Wing Leung

Legend

- (C) Team captain
- (NP) Naturalized player
- Club – describes last
  club before the tournament
- Age – describes age
  on 8 August 2017

=== Japan ===
Japan men's national basketball team – 2017 FIBA Asia Cup roster
Players
Coaches

| Pos. | No. | Name | Age – Date of birth | Height | Club | Ctr. |
|---|---|---|---|---|---|---|
| PG | 0 | Ryoma Hashimoto | 29 – May 11, 1988 | 1.78 m (5 ft 10 in) | SeaHorses Mikawa | (Japan) |
| PG | 2 | Yuki Togashi | 24 – July 30, 1993 | 1.67 m (5 ft 6 in) | Chiba Jets Funabashi | (Japan) |
| PG | 6 | Makoto Hiejima | 26 – August 11, 1990 | 1.90 m (6 ft 3 in) | SeaHorses Mikawa | (Japan) |
| PG | 7 | Ryusei Shinoyama | 29 – July 20, 1988 | 1.78 m (5 ft 10 in) | Toshiba Kawasaki Brave Thunders | (Japan) |
| C | 8 | Atsuya Ota | 33 – June 4, 1984 | 2.06 m (6 ft 9 in) | SAN-EN NeoPhoenix | (Japan) |
| C | 10 | Kosuke Takeuchi | 32 – January 29, 1985 | 2.06 m (6 ft 9 in) | Link Tochigi Brex | (Japan) |
| SG | 18 | Yudai Baba | 21 – November 7, 1995 | 1.95 m (6 ft 5 in) | University of Tsukuba | (Japan) |
| SG | 24 | Daiki Tanaka | 25 – September 3, 1991 | 1.92 m (6 ft 4 in) | Alvark Tokyo | (Japan) |
| SG | 25 | Takatoshi Furukawa | 29 – October 20, 1987 | 1.90 m (6 ft 3 in) | Link Tochigi Brex | (Japan) |
| SF | 34 | Ryumo Ono | 29 – January 6, 1988 | 1.97 m (6 ft 6 in) | Chiba Jets Funabashi | (Japan) |
| PF | 35 | Ira Brown (NP) | 35 – August 3, 1982 | 1.93 m (6 ft 4 in) | Ryukyu Golden Kings | (Japan) |
| SF | 88 | Tenketsu Harimoto | 25 – January 8, 1992 | 1.97 m (6 ft 6 in) | Nagoya Diamond Dolphins | (Japan) |

Head coach

- (Argentina) Julio Lamas

Assistant coach(es)

- (Japan) Kenichi Sako
- (Argentina) Herman Julian Mandole

Legend

- (C) Team captain
- (NP) Naturalized player
- Club – describes last
  club before the tournament
- Age – describes age
  on 8 August 2017
