= Ivan Todorović =

Ivan Todorović may refer to:

- Ivan Todorović (footballer)
- Ivan Todorović (basketball)
