= 2017 FIBA Asia Cup =

29th continental basketball championship in Asia

Tournament details
- Host country: Lebanon
- City: Zouk Mikael
- Dates: 8–20 August
- Teams: 16
- Venue: 1 (in 1 host city)

Final positions
- Champions: Australia (1st title)
- Runners-up: Iran
- Third place: South Korea
- Fourth place: New Zealand

Tournament statistics
- MVP: (Iran) Hamed Haddadi
- Top scorer: (Lebanon) Fadi El Khatib (25.9 points per game)

The 2017 FIBA Asia Cup (formerly known as the FIBA Asia Championship) was the 29th continental basketball championship in Asia. The tournament was organised by FIBA Asia. It took place from 8 to 20 August 2017, a week earlier from the initial scheduled date, in Lebanon. The Nouhad Nawfal Arena with a capacity of 8,000 seats hosted the tournament's matches.

All 16 teams who qualified for the tournament also qualified for the first round of the FIBA Asia and FIBA Oceania qualifiers for the 2019 FIBA World Cup. The top five teams in the 2016 FIBA Asia Challenge earned an extra berth in the 2017 FIBA Asia Cup for their respective sub-zones. Australia and New Zealand participated for the first time in this tournament.

Australia won their first title by defeating Iran 79–56. South Korea finished third after beating New Zealand 80–71.

== Qualification ==
One playoff berth each was allocated to the Central Asia, South Asia, Southeast Asia, and the Gulf subzones, while two berths were allocated to the West Asia subzone and three berths were allocated to the East Asia subzone. The top five teams of the 2016 FIBA Asia Challenge earned an extra berth for their subzones. Iran, Jordan, and Iraq earned three extra berths for the West Asia subzone, while South Korea and China earned two extra berths for the East Asia subzone. Australia and New Zealand from FIBA Oceania made their debut at the FIBA Asia Cup in 2017 as wild cards. Lebanon as the hosts clinched one of the five berths allocated to West Asia.

Means of Qualification	Dates	Venue	Berths	Qualifiers
Host Nation	20 January 2017	–	1	Lebanon
Central Asian Qualifying Round	1 June 2017	(Kazakhstan) Almaty	1	Kazakhstan
East Asian Basketball Championship	3–7 June 2017	(Japan) Nagano	5	Chinese Taipei; South Korea; Japan; China; Hong Kong
Gulf Basketball Championship	28 August – 4 September 2016	(United Arab Emirates) Sharjah	1	Qatar
West Asian Basketball Championship	29 January – 2 February 2017	(Jordan) Amman	4	Iran; Jordan; Iraq; Syria
Southeast Asian Basketball Championship	12–18 May 2017	(Philippines) Quezon City	1	Philippines
South Asian Basketball Championship	19–23 May 2017	(Maldives) Malé	1	India
Wild Cards (Oceania)	18 September 2016	—N/a	2	Australia; New Zealand

== Format ==
The 2017 edition would have a different format as compared to what was used since 2009. While there would still be a preliminary round robin of four groups of four teams, the single-elimination final round immediately follows the preliminary round. In the final round, the teams that finished second and third in their respective groups would play in the qualifications to quarterfinals of the final round, while the group winners automatically qualify to the quarterfinals proper.

== Draw ==
The official draw was held on May 30, 2017 at the Le Royal Hotel Dbayeh. Hosts Lebanon had the right to choose their group. At the time of the draw teams from East Asia and Central Asia have yet to secure their qualification for the 2017 FIBA Asia Cup. China, Hong Kong, South Korea, Chinese Taipei, Japan, and Kazakhstan, all of which later secured qualification, were part of the official draw.

Pot 1	Pot 2	Pot 3	Pot 4
Australia (10); China (14); New Zealand (20); Iran (25)	Philippines (27); Jordan (28); South Korea (30); Chinese Taipei (T-48)	Japan (T-48); Qatar (50); India (53); Kazakhstan (56)	Lebanon (43); Hong Kong (65); Syria (72); Iraq (92)

== Squads ==
Each team has a roster of twelve players. A team may opt to allocate a roster spot to a naturalized player.

== Referees ==
The following referees were selected for the tournament:

- (Australia) Matthew Beattie
- (Australia) Scott Paul Beker
- (China) Wang Mei
- (Hong Kong) Yuen Chun Yip
- (India) Ceciline Vincent
- (Indonesia) Harja Jaladri
- (Iran) Mohammad Doost
- (Iran) Mohammadreza Salehian
- (Iraq) Ahmed Al Yaseen Al-Suwaili
- (Japan) Toru Katayose
- (Jordan) Mohammad Fawzi Taha
- (Kazakhstan) Alexey Stepanenko
- (Kazakhstan) Yevgeniy Mikheyev
- (South Korea) Hwang In-tae
- (South Korea) Kim Jong-kuk
- (Lebanon) Marwan Egho
- (Lebanon) Rabah Noujaim
- (Lebanon) Rabee Al Masri
- (New Zealand) Matthew Ryan Bathurst
- (New Zealand) Ryan Jones
- (Oman) Ahmed Al Bulushi
- (Philippines) Ferdinand Pascual
- (Philippines) Ricor Buaron
- (Saudi Arabia) Hatim Alharbi
- (Chinese Taipei) Chuang Chih-Chun
- (Chinese Taipei) Chen Ying-Cheng

== Preliminary round ==
All times are local (UTC+3)

=== Group A ===
Pos	Team	Pld	W	L	PF	PA	PD	Pts	Qualification
1	Iran	3	3	0	271	188	+83	6	Quarterfinals
2	Jordan	3	2	1	200	203	−3	5	Playoffs
3	Syria	3	1	2	216	233	−17	4	Playoffs
4	India	3	0	3	186	249	−63	3	

Source: FIBA
Rules for classification: 1) Points; 2) Head-to-head results; 3) Points difference; 4) Points scored.

9 August 2017
16:00

Boxscore

Iran	101–54	India
Scoring by quarter: 29–8, 21–14, 29–17, 22–15
Pts: Haddadi 20; Rebs: Kazemi 10; Asts: Haddadi 8		Pts: Amj. Singh 10; Rebs: Hafeez, Amj. Singh 5 Asts: A. Singh 4

Nouhad Nawfal Arena, Zouk Mikael
Referees: Marwan Egho (LBN), Toru Katayose (JPN), Kim Jong-kuk (KOR)

9 August 2017
21:00

Boxscore

Jordan	68–66	Syria
Scoring by quarter: 28–12, 16–21, 10–18, 14–15
Pts: Al-Awadi 16; Rebs: Abuwazaneh 10; Asts: Abdeen 7		Pts: Aljabi 25; Rebs: Madanly 9 Asts: Al-Hamwi, Madanly 4

Nouhad Nawfal Arena, Zouk Mikael
Referees: Chen Ying-Cheng (TPE), Matthew Beattie (AUS), Yuen Chun Yip (HKG)

11 August 2017
18:30

Boxscore

India	54–61	Jordan
Scoring by quarter: 14–15, 9–11, 14–18, 17–17
Pts: Amj. Singh 17; Rebs: Annadurai 10; Asts: Poiyamozhi 4		Pts: Al-Awadi 22; Rebs: Alhamarsheh 13; Asts: Abdeen 5

Nouhad Nawfal Arena, Zouk Mikael
Referees: Marwan Egho (LBN), Kim Jong-kuk (KOR), Yuen Chun Yip (HKG)

11 August 2017
21:00

Boxscore

Syria	63–87	Iran
Scoring by quarter: 20–28, 12–24, 19–18, 12–17
Pts: Madanly 22; Rebs: three players 5 each Asts: Alhaddad 5		Pts: Yakhchali 25; Rebs: Haddadi 13; Asts: Haddadi, Jamshidi 9

Nouhad Nawfal Arnea, Zouk Mikael
Referees: Scott Paul Beker (AUS), Hwang In-tae (KOR), Yevgeniy Mikheyev (KAZ)

13 August 2017
18:30

Boxscore

Iran	83–71	Jordan
Scoring by quarter: 19–12, 24–14, 19–24, 21–21
Pts: Yakhchali 20; Rebs: Yakhchali 10; Asts: Haddadi 9		Pts: Abdeen 22; Rebs: Hussein 8 Asts: Abdeen 9

Nouhad Nawfal Arena, Zouk Mikael
Referees: Matthew Ryan Bathurst (NZL), Scott Paul Beker (AUS), Toru Katayose (JPN)

13 August 2017
21:00

Boxscore

Syria	87–78	India
Scoring by quarter: 17–25, 18–26, 25–17, 27–10
Pts: Todorović 23; Rebs: Todorović 14; Asts: Alhaddad 9		Pts: Annadurai 20; Rebs: Amr. Singh 13; Asts: Amj. Singh 8

Nouhad Nawfal Arena , Zouk Mikael
Referees: Chen Ying-Cheng (TPE), Hwang In-tae (KOR), Yuen Chun Yip (HKG)

=== Group B ===
Pos	Team	Pld	W	L	PF	PA	PD	Pts	Qualification
1	Philippines	3	3	0	260	229	+31	6	Quarterfinals
2	China	3	2	1	240	223	+17	5	Playoffs
3	Iraq	3	1	2	203	211	−8	4	Playoffs
4	Qatar	3	0	3	207	247	−40	3	

Source: FIBA
Rules for classification: 1) Points; 2) Head-to-head results; 3) Points difference; 4) Points scored.

9 August 2017
13:30

Boxscore

China	87–96	Philippines
Scoring by quarter: 16–26, 23–27, 31–23, 17–20
Pts: Guo 18; Rebs: Hu 7 Asts: Guo, Liu 5		Pts: Romeo 26; Rebs: Pogoy, Standhardinger 6 Asts: William 7

Nouhad Nawfal Arena, Zouk Mikael
Referees: Rabah Noujaim (LBN), Scott Paul Beker (AUS), Yevgeniy Mikheyev (KAZ)

9 August 2017
18:30

Boxscore

Iraq	75–66	Qatar
Scoring by quarter: 24–19, 14–17, 20–9, 17–21
Pts: Galloway 16; Rebs: Galloway 8 Asts: Hamzah 8		Pts: Saad 23; Rebs: Erfan 12; Asts: Elhadary, Mohamed 4

Nouhad Nawfal Arena, Zouk Mikael
Referees: Hwang In-tae (KOR), Matthew Ryan Bathurst (NZL), Chuang Chih-Chun (TPE)

11 August 2017
13:30

Boxscore

Qatar	67–92	China
Scoring by quarter: 21–27, 15–17, 14–15, 17–33
Pts: Saad 19; Rebs: Abdelhaleem, Erfan 7 Asts: Mohammed, Saad 3		Pts: Guo 30; Rebs: Hu 12; Asts: Guo, Liu 4

Nouhad Nawfal Arena, Zouk Mikael
Referees: Matthew Beattie (AUS), Matthew Ryan Bathurst (NZL), Chen Ying-Cheng (TPE)

11 August 2017
16:00

Boxscore

Philippines	84–68	Iraq
Scoring by quarter: 17–19, 15–12, 28–9, 24–28
Pts: Romeo 17; Rebs: three players 7 Asts: William 6		Pts: Galloway 23; Rebs: Galloway 14; Asts: Galloway 6

Nouhad Nawfal Arena, Zouk Mikael
Referees: Rabah Noujaim (LBN), Ryan Jones (NZL), Toru Katayose (JPN)

13 August 2017
13:30

Boxscore

Iraq	60–61	China
Scoring by quarter: 15–8, 11–20, 20–10, 14–23
Pts: Alazawi 22; Rebs: Galloway 8 Asts: Galloway 10		Pts: Guo 19; Rebs: Ren 8 Asts: Ren 4

Nouhad Nawfal Arena, Zouk Mikael
Referees: Rabah Noujaim (LBN), Matthew Beattie (AUS), Yevgeniy Mikheyev (KAZ)

13 August 2017
16:00

Boxscore

Philippines	80–74	Qatar
Scoring by quarter: 25–16, 16–11, 18–20, 21–27
Pts: Wright 25; Rebs: Norwood, Pogoy 7 Asts: Norwood 5		Pts: Elhadary 23; Rebs: Saad 11; Asts: Elhadary 6

Nouhad Nawfal Arena, Zouk Mikael
Referees: Ryan Jones (NZL), Marwan Egho (LBN), Kim Jong-kuk (KOR)

=== Group C ===
Pos	Team	Pld	W	L	PF	PA	PD	Pts	Qualification
1	New Zealand	3	2	1	231	207	+24	5 (Note: New Zealand 1–1, 1.02)	Quarterfinals
2	Lebanon (H)	3	2	1	250	226	+24	5 (Note: Lebanon 1–1, 1.01)	Playoffs
3	South Korea	3	2	1	258	202	+56	5 (Note: South Korea 1–1, 0.97)	Playoffs
4	Kazakhstan	3	0	3	178	282	−104	3	

Source: FIBA
Rules for classification: 1) Points; 2) Head-to-head results; 3) Points difference; 4) Points scored.
(H) Hosts
Notes:

8 August 2017
13:30

Boxscore

Kazakhstan	49–70	New Zealand
Scoring by quarter: 11–15, 11–14, 15–25, 12–16
Pts: Zhigulin 9 Rebs: Yargaliyev 7 Asts: Yargaliyev 4		Pts: Raukawa 17; Rebs: Delany 10; Asts: three players 3 each

Nouhad Nawfal Arena, Zouk Mikael
Referees: Wang Mei (CHN), Mohammadreza Salehian (IRI), Ceciline Vincent (IND)

8 August 2017
21:00

Boxscore

Lebanon	72–66	South Korea
Scoring by quarter: 20–18, 20–13, 14–10, 18–25
Pts: Arakji 22; Rebs: Bawji 12; Asts: El Khatib 4		Pts: Lim, Oh 16; Rebs: Oh 7 Asts: Choi, Kim 4

Nouhad Nawfal Arena, Zouk Mikael
Referees: Ferdinand Pascual (PHI), Ahmed Al Bulushi (OMA), Harja Jaladri (INA)

10 August 2017
18:30

Boxscore

South Korea	116–55	Kazakhstan
Scoring by quarter: 18–15, 32–11, 32–11, 34–18
Pts: Lee Ju. 19; Rebs: Park 7 Asts: Park 14		Pts: Yevstigneyev 19; Rebs: Yevstigneyev 7 Asts: Yagodkin 5

Nouhad Nawfal Arena, Zouk Mikael
Referees: Ahmed Al Bulushi (OMA), Mohammad Doost (IRI), Mohammad Fawzi Taha (JOR)

10 August 2017
21:00

Boxscore

New Zealand	86–82	Lebanon
Scoring by quarter: 19–23, 23–17, 25–21, 19–21
Pts: Ili 22; Rebs: Te Rangi, Timmins 8 Asts: Ili 4		Pts: El Khatib 33; Rebs: El Khatib 11; Asts: El Khatib 8

Nouhad Nawfal Arena, Zouk Mikael
Referees: Ahmed Al Yaseen Al-Suwaili (IRQ), Hatim Alharbi (KSA), Ferdinand Pascual (PHI)

12 August 2017
18:30

Boxscore

South Korea	76–75	New Zealand
Scoring by quarter: 19–17, 22–13, 12–27, 23–18
Pts: Lee Jo. 16; Rebs: Oh 7 Asts: Park 7		Pts: Raukawa 14; Rebs: Delany 8 Asts: Te Rangi 5

Nouhad Nawfal Arena, Zouk Mikael
Referees: Ricor Buaron (PHI), Mohammadreza Salehian (IRI), Yuen Chun Yip (HKG)

12 August 2017
21:00

Boxscore

Kazakhstan	74–96	Lebanon
Scoring by quarter: 23–33, 10–23, 21–23, 20–17
Pts: Yargaliyev 23; Rebs: Ponomarev 6 Asts: Yagodkin 6		Pts: Arakji 20; Rebs: Haidar 9 Asts: Mezher 6

Nouhad Nawfal Arena, Zouk Mikael
Referees: Ahmed Al Bulushi (OMA), Mohammad Doost (IRI), Harja Jaladri (INA)

=== Group D ===
Pos	Team	Pld	W	L	PF	PA	PD	Pts	Qualification
1	Australia	3	3	0	273	176	+97	6	Quarterfinals
2	Japan	3	2	1	247	192	+55	5	Playoffs
3	Chinese Taipei	3	1	2	176	239	−63	4	Playoffs
4	Hong Kong	3	0	3	179	268	−89	3	

Source: FIBA
Rules for classification: 1) Points; 2) Head-to-head results; 3) Points difference; 4) Points scored.

8 August 2017
16:00

Boxscore

Japan	68–84	Australia
Scoring by quarter: 20–19, 11–23, 12–22, 25–20
Pts: Harimoto 13; Rebs: Ono 4 Asts: Togashi 3		Pts: Cadee, Gliddon 13; Rebs: Hodgson 12; Asts: Cadee, Kickert 5

Nouhad Nawfal Arena, Zouk Mikael
Referees: Ricor Buaron (PHI), Hatim Alharbi (KSA), Ahmed Ali Yaseen Al-Suwaili (IRQ)

8 August 2017
18:30

Boxscore

Hong Kong	62–77	Chinese Taipei
Scoring by quarter: 18–13, 17–17, 18–25, 9–22
Pts: Reid 19; Rebs: Reid 12; Asts: Reid 5		Pts: Chou Y.H. 22; Rebs: Chou P.H. 13; Asts: Chiang, Chou 2

Nouhad Nawfal Arena, Zouk Mikael
Referees: Mohammad Doost (IRI), Rabee Al Masri (LBN), Ryan Jones (NZL)

10 August 2017
13:30

Boxscore

Chinese Taipei	49–87	Japan
Scoring by quarter: 17–22, 5–18, 12–20, 15–27
Pts: Chou Y.H. 15; Rebs: Chou P.H., Liu 5 Asts: Chou Y.H., Liu 2		Pts: Furukawa, Hiejima 15; Rebs: Ota 10; Asts: Hiejima, Shinoyama 4

Nouhad Nawfal Arena, Zouk Mikael
Referees: Harja Jaladri (INA), Ricor Buaron (PHI), Wang Mei (CHN)

10 August 2017
16:00

Boxscore

Australia	99–58	Hong Kong
Scoring by quarter: 28–15, 28–15, 25–15, 18–13
Pts: Blanchfield 18; Rebs: Creek 9 Asts: Cadee 5		Pts: Lo 11; Rebs: Fong 5 Asts: Lo 5

Nouhad Nawfal Arena, Zouk Mikael
Referees: Alexey Stepanenko (KAZ), Rabee Al Masri (LBN), Mohammadreza Salehian (IRI)

12 August 2017
13:30

Boxscore

Japan	92–59	Hong Kong
Scoring by quarter: 23–15, 23–9, 22–18, 24–17
Pts: Hiejima 15; Rebs: Brown, Takeuchi 8 Asts: Brown 6		Pts: Lee 20; Rebs: Reid 11; Asts: four players 3

Nouhad Nawfal Arena, Zouk Mikael
Referees: Rabee Al Masri (LBN), Matthew Beattie (AUS), Alexey Stepanenko (KAZ)

12 August 2017
16:00

Boxscore

Chinese Taipei	50–90	Australia
Scoring by quarter: 14–22, 9–23, 13–20, 14–25
Pts: Liu 17; Rebs: Liu 3 Asts: Chiang Yu-an, Liu 3		Pts: Creek 22; Rebs: McCarron 8 Asts: Newley 9

Nouhad Nawfal Arena, Zouk Mikael
Referees: Ferdinand Pascual (PHI), Ahmed Al Yaseen Al-Suwaili (IRQ), Mohammad Fawzi Taha (JOR)

== Final round ==
=== Bracket ===
Playoffs
Lebanon	90
Chinese Taipei	77
Japan	68
South Korea	81
Jordan	84
Iraq	70
China	81
Syria	79

Quarterfinals
Iran	80
Lebanon	70
Philippines	86
South Korea	118
New Zealand	98
Jordan	70
Australia	97
China	71

Semifinals
Iran	87
South Korea	81
New Zealand	79
Australia	106

Final
Iran	56
Australia	79
Third place
South Korea	80
New Zealand	71

Classification 5th–8th

Classification semifinals
Lebanon	106
Philippines	87
Jordan	55
China	86

Fifth place game
Lebanon	78
China	79
Seventh place game
Philippines	75
Jordan	70

=== Playoffs ===
14 August 2017
18:30

Boxscore

Japan	68–81	South Korea
Scoring by quarter: 15–17, 26–22, 15–18, 12–24
Pts: Brown 14; Rebs: three players 5 Asts: three players 3		Pts: Kim, Oh 16; Rebs: Lee Jo. 7 Asts: Kim 7

Nouhad Nawfal Arena, Zouk Mikael
Referees: Harja Jaladri (INA), Ahmed Al Bulushi (OMA), Ryan Jones (NZL)

14 August 2017
21:00

Boxscore

Lebanon	90–77	Chinese Taipei
Scoring by quarter: 24–20, 30–17, 20–22, 16–18
Pts: El Khatib 30; Rebs: El Khatib, Tabet 7 Asts: Bawji, Mezher 5		Pts: Chou Y.H., Liu 17; Rebs: Chiang 6 Asts: Chou Y.H. 5

Nouhad Nawfal Arena, Zouk Mikael
Referees: Yevgeniy Mikheyev (KAZ), Ahmed Al Yaseen Al-Suwaili (IRQ), Scott Paul Beker (AUS)

15 August 2017
18:30

Boxscore

China	81–79	Syria
Scoring by quarter: 19–23, 22–26, 15–19, 25–11
Pts: Li 19; Rebs: Ren 9 Asts: Liu 7		Pts: Madanly 35; Rebs: Cheikh Ali 7 Asts: Madanly 7

Nouhad Nawfal Arena, Zouk Mikael
Referees: Marwan Egho (LBN), Kim Jong-kuk (KOR), Ferdinand Pascual (PHI)

15 August 2017
21:00

Boxscore

Jordan	84–70	Iraq
Scoring by quarter: 21–16, 17–21, 23–14, 23–19
Pts: Abdeen, Abu Hawwas 18; Rebs: Hussein 19; Asts: Abdeen 10		Pts: Al-Khafaji 21; Rebs: Galloway 8 Asts: Galloway 6

Nouhad Nawfal Arena, Zouk Mikael
Referees: Hwang In-tae (KOR), Toru Katayose (JPN), Rabah Noujaim (LBN)

=== Quarterfinals ===
16 August 2017
18:30

Boxscore

Philippines	86–118	South Korea
Scoring by quarter: 18–26, 31–31, 13–29, 24–32
Pts: Romeo 22; Rebs: Aguilar 9 Asts: William, Wright 4		Pts: Oh 22; Rebs: Oh, Park 5 Asts: Park 9

Nouhad Nawfal Arena, Zouk Mikael
Referees: Scott Paul Beker (AUS), Matthew Beattie (AUS), Ryan Jones (NZL)

16 August 2017
21:00

Boxscore

Iran	80–70	Lebanon
Scoring by quarter: 18–12, 19–19, 19–13, 24–26
Pts: Jamshidi 24; Rebs: Haddadi 20; Asts: Yakhchali 5		Pts: Arakji 24; Rebs: Abdelnour 7 Asts: Abdelnour 6

Nouhad Nawfal Arena, Zouk Mikael
Referees: Yevgeniy Mikheyev (KAZ), Harja Jaladri (INA), Alexey Stepanenko (KAZ)

17 August 2017
18:30

Boxscore

Australia	97–71	China
Scoring by quarter: 26–23, 19–19, 26–13, 26–16
Pts: Creek 20; Rebs: Hodgson, Newley 6 Asts: Newley 5		Pts: Li 19; Rebs: Guo 5 Asts: four players 2

Nouhad Nawfal Arena, Zouk Mikael
Referees: Marwan Egho (LBN), Rabah Noujaim (LBN), Mohammadreza Salehian (IRI)

17 August 2017
21:00

Boxscore

New Zealand	98–70	Jordan
Scoring by quarter: 21–12, 29–26, 16–19, 32–13
Pts: Smith-Milner 19; Rebs: Timmins 11; Asts: Ili 13		Pts: Abdeen 24; Rebs: Hussein 5 Asts: Abdeen 5

Nouhad Nawfal Arena, Zouk Mikael
Referees: Ferdinand Pascual (PHI), Hwang In-tae (KOR), Toru Katayose (JPN)

=== 5th–8th place semifinals ===
19 August 2017
13:30

Boxscore

Jordan	55–86	China
Scoring by quarter: 10–22, 20–17, 14–16, 11–31
Pts: Hussein 18; Rebs: Hussein 8 Asts: Bzai 4		Pts: Hu 14; Rebs: Han, Ren 7 Asts: Zeng 6

Nouhad Nawfal Arena, Zouk Mikael
Referees: Ahmed Al Bulushi (OMA), Ahmed Al Yaseen Al-Suwaili (IRQ), Hwang In-tae (KOR)

19 August 2017
16:00

Boxscore

Lebanon	106–87	Philippines
Scoring by quarter: 29–18, 21–24, 25–19, 31–26
Pts: El Khatib 36; Rebs: Pelle 13; Asts: El Khatib 8 Blocks: Pelle 9		Pts: Romeo 19; Rebs: Aguilar 6 Asts: William 7

Nouhad Nawfal Arena, Zouk Mikael
Referees: Scott Paul Beker (AUS), Matthew Beattie (AUS), Alexey Stepanenko (KAZ)

=== Semifinals ===
19 August 2017
18:30

Boxscore

New Zealand	79–106	Australia
Scoring by quarter: 10–31, 23–15, 25–31, 21–29
Pts: Te Rangi 15; Rebs: Smith-Milner, Te Rangi 6 Asts: Ili 4		Pts: Hodgson 15; Rebs: Kay 10; Asts: Brandt, Cadee 5

Nouhad Nawfal Arena, Zouk Mikael
Referees: Marwan Egho (LBN), Harja Jaladri (INA), Yevgeniy Mikheyev (KAZ)

19 August 2017
21:00

Boxscore

Iran	87–81	South Korea
Scoring by quarter: 30–13, 9–20, 18–28, 30–20
Pts: Yakhchali 21; Rebs: Haddadi 14; Asts: Haddadi 8		Pts: Oh 21; Rebs: Oh 5 Asts: Choi, Lee Ju. 5

Nouhad Nawfal Arena, Zouk Mikael
Referees: Ferdinand Pascual (PHI), Rabee Al Masri (LBN), Yuen Chun Yip (HKG)

=== Seventh place game ===
20 August 2017
13:30

Boxscore

Philippines	75–70	Jordan
Scoring by quarter: 17–17, 18–10, 23–26, 17–17
Pts: Romeo, Wright 13; Rebs: Aguilar 7 Asts: William 8		Pts: Al-Awadi 21; Rebs: Hussein 15; Asts: Abdeen 4

Nouhad Nawfal Arena, Zouk Mikael
Referees: Wang Mei (CHN), Mohammad Doost (IRI), Chuang Chih-Chun (TPE)

=== Fifth place game ===
20 August 2017
16:00

Boxscore

Lebanon	78–79	China
Scoring by quarter: 16–19, 23–15, 13–25, 26–20
Pts: El Khatib 30; Rebs: Bawji 9 Asts: El Khatib 4 Blocks: Pelle 8		Pts: three players 13; Rebs: Han, Hu 6 Asts: Ren 6

Nouhad Nawfal Arena, Zouk Mikael
Referees: Hwang In-tae (KOR), Ryan Jones (NZL), Yuen Chun Yip (HKG)

=== Third place game ===
20 August 2017
18:30

Boxscore

South Korea	80–71	New Zealand
Scoring by quarter: 25–17, 19–14, 22–22, 14–18
Pts: Heo 20; Rebs: Oh 8 Asts: Choi, Kim 7		Pts: Delany 22; Rebs: Timmins 17; Asts: Te Rangi, Timmins 3

Nouhad Nawfal Arena, Zouk Mikael
Referees: Harja Jaladri (INA), Chen Ying-Cheng (TPE), Toru Katayose (JPN)

=== Final ===
20 August 2017
21:00

Boxscore

Iran	56–79	Australia
Scoring by quarter: 14–18, 12–25, 17–13, 13–23
Pts: Haddadi 18; Rebs: Kazemi 10; Asts: Jamshidi 5		Pts: Newley 18; Rebs: Brandt 8 Asts: Cadee 8

Nouhad Nawfal Arena, Zouk Mikael
Referees: Ferdinand Pascual (PHI), Yevgeniy Mikheyev (KAZ), Rabah Noujaim (LBN)

== Marketing ==
Ox the Fox

The official logo and mascot of the competition was unveiled on May 30, 2017. The logo was derived from the Lebanese flag described by designers as "flapping like the wings of the phoenix". The red stripes of the logo forms an image of the ball with an image of the tournament cup in its center.

The official mascot of the competition is named Ox the Fox. Ox represents "great team spirit" and is characterized as quick, agile, and smart. These are three qualities which the designers of the mascot as essential for "any basketball player".

== Final standings ==
Rank	Team	Record
1st place, gold medalist(s)	Australia	6–0
2nd place, silver medalist(s)	Iran	5–1
3rd place, bronze medalist(s)	South Korea	5–2
4	New Zealand	3–3
5	China	5–2
6	Lebanon	4–3
7	Philippines	4–2
8	Jordan	3–4
9	Japan	2–2
10	Syria	1–3
11	Iraq	1–3
12	Chinese Taipei	1–3
13	Qatar	0–3
14	India	0–3
15	Hong Kong	0–3
16	Kazakhstan	0–3

== Awards ==
2017 Asian champions

Australia
1st title

- Most Valuable Player: (Iran) Hamed Haddadi
- All-Star Team:
  - PG – (New Zealand) Shea Ili
  - SG – (Iran) Mohammad Jamshidi
  - SF – (Lebanon) Fadi El Khatib
  - PF – (South Korea) Oh Se-keun
  - C – (Iran) Hamed Haddadi

== Statistical leaders ==
=== Players ===
Points

Pos.	Name	PPG
1	(Lebanon) Fadi El Khatib	25.9
2	(Syria) Michael Madanly	20.5
3	(Philippines) Terrence Romeo	17.8
4	(Syria) Tarek Al-Jabi	17.8
5	(China) Guo Ailun	17.0

Rebounds

Pos.	Name	RPG
1	(Iran) Hamed Haddadi	10.8
2	(Jordan) Mohammad Hussein	9.9
3	(Iraq) Kevin Galloway	9.5
4	(Iran) Arsalan Kazemi	8.2
5	(New Zealand) Sam Timmins	8.0

Assists

Pos.	Name	APG
1	(Iran) Hamed Haddadi	6.5
2	(Iraq) Kevin Galloway	6.3
3	(Jordan) Mahmoud Abdeen	5.9
4	(New Zealand) Shea Ili	5.8
5	(Philippines) Jayson William	5.7

Steals

Pos.	Name	SPG
1	(Iraq) Kevin Galloway	3.0
2	(Japan) Ira Brown	2.5
2	(Chinese Taipei) Liu Cheng	2.5
4	(Iran) Sajjad Mashayekhi	2.3
5	(South Korea) Kim Sun-hyung	2.3

Blocks

Pos.	Name	BPG
1	(Lebanon) Norvel Pelle	4.0
2	(Iraq) Ali Hameed	2.3
3	(Philippines) Japeth Aguilar	1.8
3	(Iran) Hamed Haddadi	1.8
5	(South Korea) Lee Jong-hyun	1.5
5	(Iraq) Mohammed Al-Khafaji	1.5

Other statistical leaders

Stat	Name	Avg.
Field goal percentage	(Australia) Mitch Creek	68.5%
3-point FG percentage	(South Korea) Kim Sun-hyung	60.0%
Free throw percentage	(Philippines) Terrence Romeo	90.0%
Turnovers	(Iran) Hamed Haddadi	4.5
Fouls	(Iraq) Mohammed Al-Khafaji	4.5

=== Teams ===
Points

Pos.	Name	PPG
1	Australia	92.5
2	South Korea	88.3
3	Lebanon	84.9
4	Philippines	84.7
5	Iran	82.3

Rebounds

Pos.	Name	RPG
1	Australia	43.0
2	Iran	42.8
3	Syria	41.3
4	Iraq	40.8
5	New Zealand	38.8

Assists

Pos.	Name	APG
1	South Korea	26.4
2	Australia	23.8
3	Iran	22.2
4	Lebanon	19.6
5	Syria	19.3

Steals

Pos.	Name	SPG
1	Iraq	11.5
2	Japan	9.5
3	Australia	9.2
4	South Korea	9.1
5	Lebanon	8.9

Blocks

Pos.	Name	BPG
1	Lebanon	5.3
2	Iraq	4.8
3	Philippines	3.7
4	South Korea	3.6
5	Japan	3.5

Other statistical leaders

Stat	Name	Avg.
Field goal percentage	Australia	59.9%
3-point FG percentage	Japan	43.2%
Free throw percentage	New Zealand	85.9%
Turnovers	Chinese Taipei	18.3
Fouls	Iraq	23.5

=== Tournament game highs ===
Category	Player game high	Total	Opponent (date)	Team game high	Total	Opponent (date)
Points	(Lebanon) Fadi El Khatib	36	Philippines (19 August)	South Korea	118	Philippines (16 August)
Rebounds	(Iran) Hamed Haddadi	20	Lebanon (16 August)	Syria	52	India (13 August)
Assists	(South Korea) Park Chan-hee	14	Kazakhstan (10 August)	South Korea	38	Kazakhstan (10 August)
Steals	(Iraq) Kevin Galloway (South Korea) Kim Sun-hyung (Iran) Sajjad Mashayekhi (Lebanon) Ali Mezher	6	Jordan (15 August); New Zealand (20 August); India (9 August); Kazakhstan (12 August)	Iraq	19	Jordan (15 August)
Blocks	(Lebanon) Norvel Pelle	9	Philippines (19 August)	Iraq	19	Jordan (15 August)
