= 2011 Korean Basketball League draft =

2011 KBL draft

General information
- Sport: Basketball
- Date: January 31, 2011
- Location: Seoul Education and Cultural Center

Overview
- League: KBL
- First selection: Oh Se-keun (Anyang KGC)

The 2011 Korean Basketball League rookie draft (Korean: 2011 KBL 국내신인선수 드래프트) was held on January 31, 2011, at the Education and Cultural Center in Yangjae-dong, Seoul, South Korea. Out of the 44 players who participated in the draft, 35 were selected. Anyang KGC won the lottery for the first overall pick, having finished in eighth place during the 2009–10 season.

== Draft selections ==
This table only shows the first twenty picks.

G	Guard
F	Forward
C	Center

Denotes players who have won a KBL-sanctioned award at its annual awards ceremony (Note: One or more of the following awards: Regular season MVP; Playoffs MVP; Rookie of the Year; Best 5; Defensive Player of the Year; Defensive Best 5; Sixth Man Award; Most Improved Player; Fair Play Award)

Round	Pick	Player	Position	Team	School/club team
1	1	Oh Se-keun	C	Anyang KGC	Chung-Ang University (senior)
1	2	Kim Sun-hyung	G	Seoul SK Knights	Chung-Ang University (senior)
1	3	Choi Jin-soo	F	Goyang Orions	Taegu Science University
1	4	Ham Nu-ri (Note: Changed his legal name to Ham Jun-hoo in 2020.)	F	Incheon Electro Land Elephants	Chung-Ang University (senior)
1	5	Kim Hyun-ho	F	Wonju Dongbu Promy	Yonsei University (senior)
1	6	Yoo Sung-ho	C	Seoul Samsung Thunders	Korea University (senior)
1	7	Kim Hyun-min	F	Busan KT Sonicboom	Dankook University (senior)
1	8	Jung Chang-young	G	Changwon LG Sakers	Korea University (senior)
1	9	Jung Min-soo	F	Jeonju KCC Egis	Myongji University (senior)
1	10	Lee Ji-won	G	Ulsan Mobis Phoebus	Kyung Hee University (senior)
2	11	Kim Dong-ryang	C	Ulsan Mobis Phoebus	Dongguk University (senior)
2	12	Kim Tae-hong	F	Jeonju KCC Egis	Korea University
2	13	Ahn Jeong-hwan	F	Changwon LG Sakers	Myongji University
2	14	Bang Duk-won	C	Busan KT Sonicboom	Sungkyunkwan University
2	15	Lee Gwan-hee	G	Seoul Samsung Thunders	Yonsei University (senior)
2	16	Cha Min-seok	F	Anyang KGC	Konkuk University
2	17	Kim Tae-hyung	G	Incheon Electro Land Elephants (Note: Traded to Seoul Samsung Thunders in a player exchange prior to his KBL debut)	Sungkyunkwan University
2	18	Kim Min-seop	F	Goyang Orions	Sungkyunkwan University
2	19	Kwon Yong-woong	G	Seoul SK Knights	Yonsei University (senior)
2	20	Hong Se-yong (Note: Changed his legal name to Hong Kyung-gi in 2016.)	G	Wonju Dongbu Promy	Korea University

== Players ==
The 2011 draft was highly anticipated by observers and KBL coaches as it included seniors responsible for Chung-Ang University's record-breaking run of 52 consecutive wins in the collegiate basketball league (from November 2008 to November 2009). The main players, center Oh Se-keun and point guard Kim Sun-hyung, have gone on to win the KBL Championship and the KBL Most Valuable Player Award and were key players in the South Korean national team winning gold in the 2014 Asian Games.

The third pick of the draft Choi Jin-soo is the first South Korean to receive an NCAA Division I basketball scholarship and played for the University of Maryland. He was the youngest of the draft class as the "early entry" option was still unheard of at that time and nearly all participants were college seniors. The third overall pick, he was chosen by Goyang Orions, where his father Kim Yoo-taek was then a member of the coaching staff.

== See also ==
- Korean Basketball League draft
