= Mehran Hatami =

Iranian basketball coach (b. 1964)

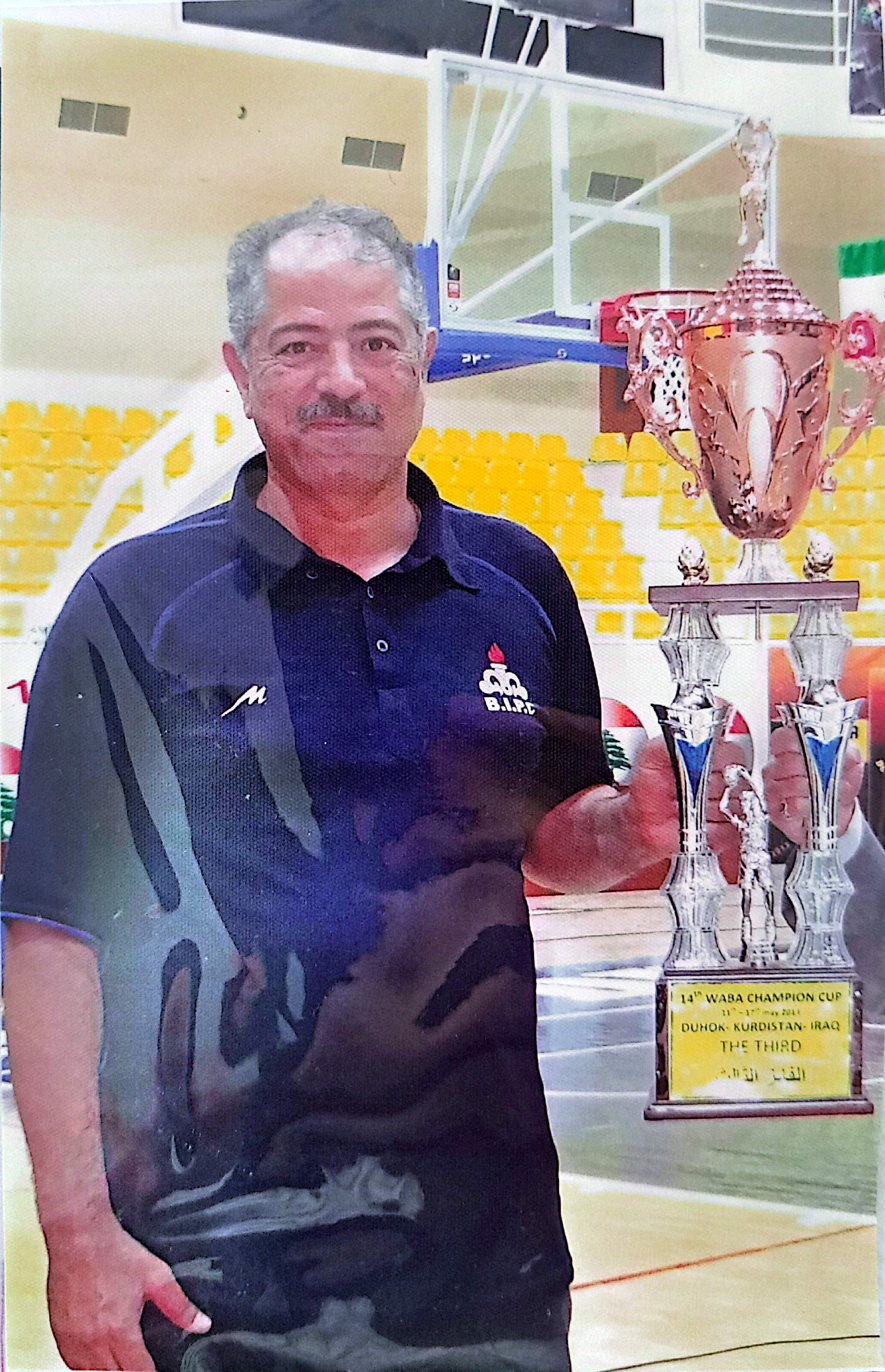

Personal information
- Born: 21 April 1964 (age 62) Shiraz, Imperial State of Iran

Mehran Hatami (Persian: مهران حاتمی) is an Iranian basketball coach of the Iranian national team, which he coached at the 2017 FIBA Asia Cup. A former member of Team Melli in the Asian Games and FIBA Championships during the 1990s, Hatami succeeded Dirk Bauermann as head coach of the Iranian national team.

== Career Summary ==
Mehran Hatami is a professional basketball coach with over 27 years of coaching at national and club levels, as well as a 10-year career as a national team player. Hatami has coached teams at the Olympic Games, as well as World Cups and Asian Championships.

== Playing Career ==
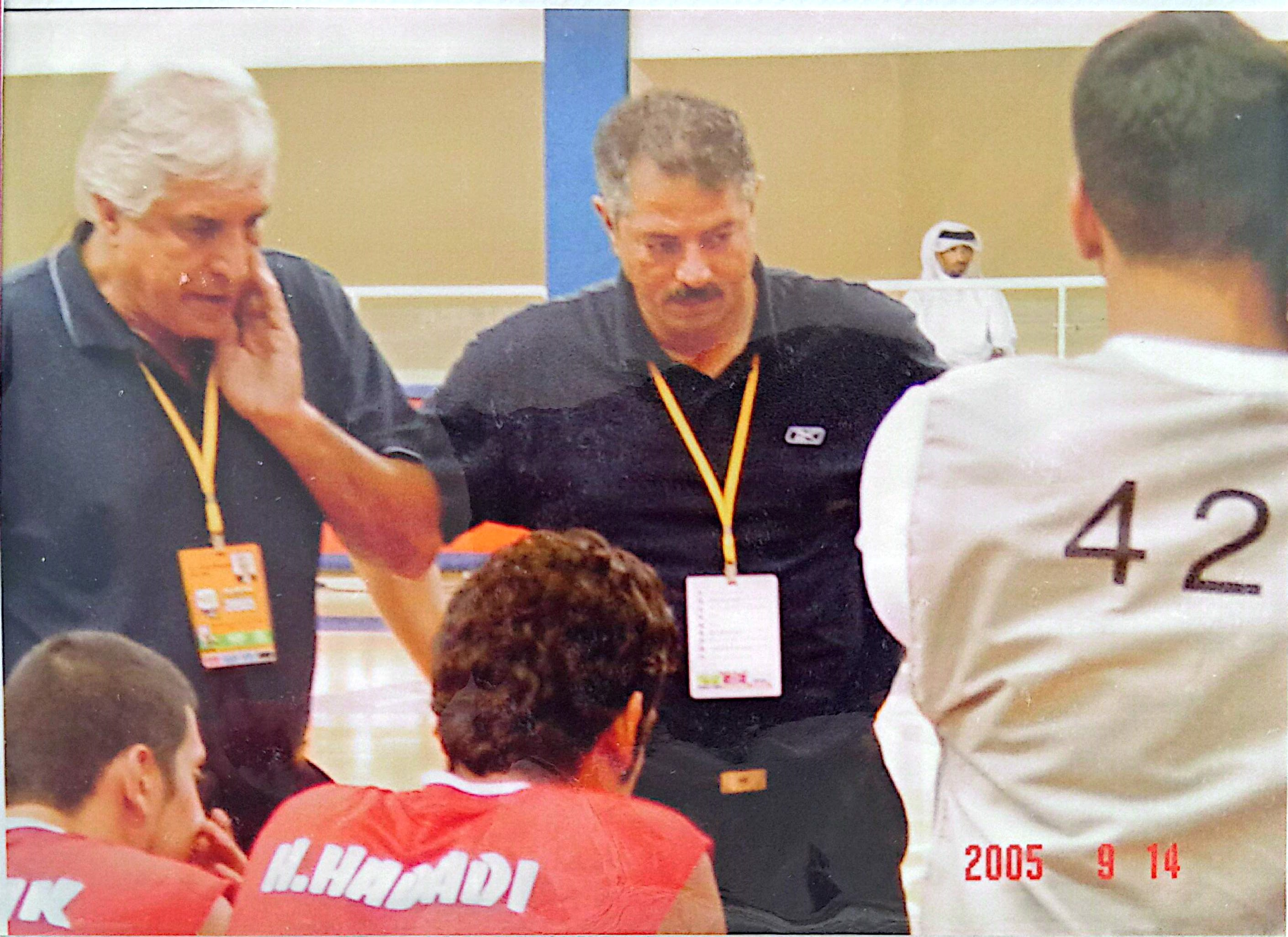

National Basketball Team Player (10 Years)

=== Competitions Participated ===
- Asian Games: Beijing 1990, Hiroshima 1994, Bangkok 1998
- Asian Basketball Championships: Beijing 1989, Kobe 1991, Jakarta 1993, Seoul 1995, Riyadh 1997
- Asian Interclub Basketball Championship: 4th Place, Jakarta (1990)

== Coaching Experience ==
=== National Team Coaching ===
- Head Coach, Junior National Team, Kuwait (2002) – 2nd Place, 17th ABC Asian

==== Senior National Team Coach, Iran ====
- West Asian Cup (2004)
- 23rd FIBA Asia Championship, Doha, Qatar (2005)
- Asian Olympic Games, Qatar (2006) – 3rd Place
- Asian Cup, Tokushima, Japan (2007) – 1st Place
- FIBA Diamond Ball, Haining, China (2008) – 3rd Place
- Beijing Olympics (2008)
- FIBA World Cup, Istanbul, Turkey (2010)
- Asian Games, Guangzhou, China (2010) – 3rd Place
- ABC Tournament, China (2011) – 3rd Place
- FIBA Asia Cup, Lebanon (2018) – Finalist
- World Cup Qualification, Bahrain (2021) – Winner

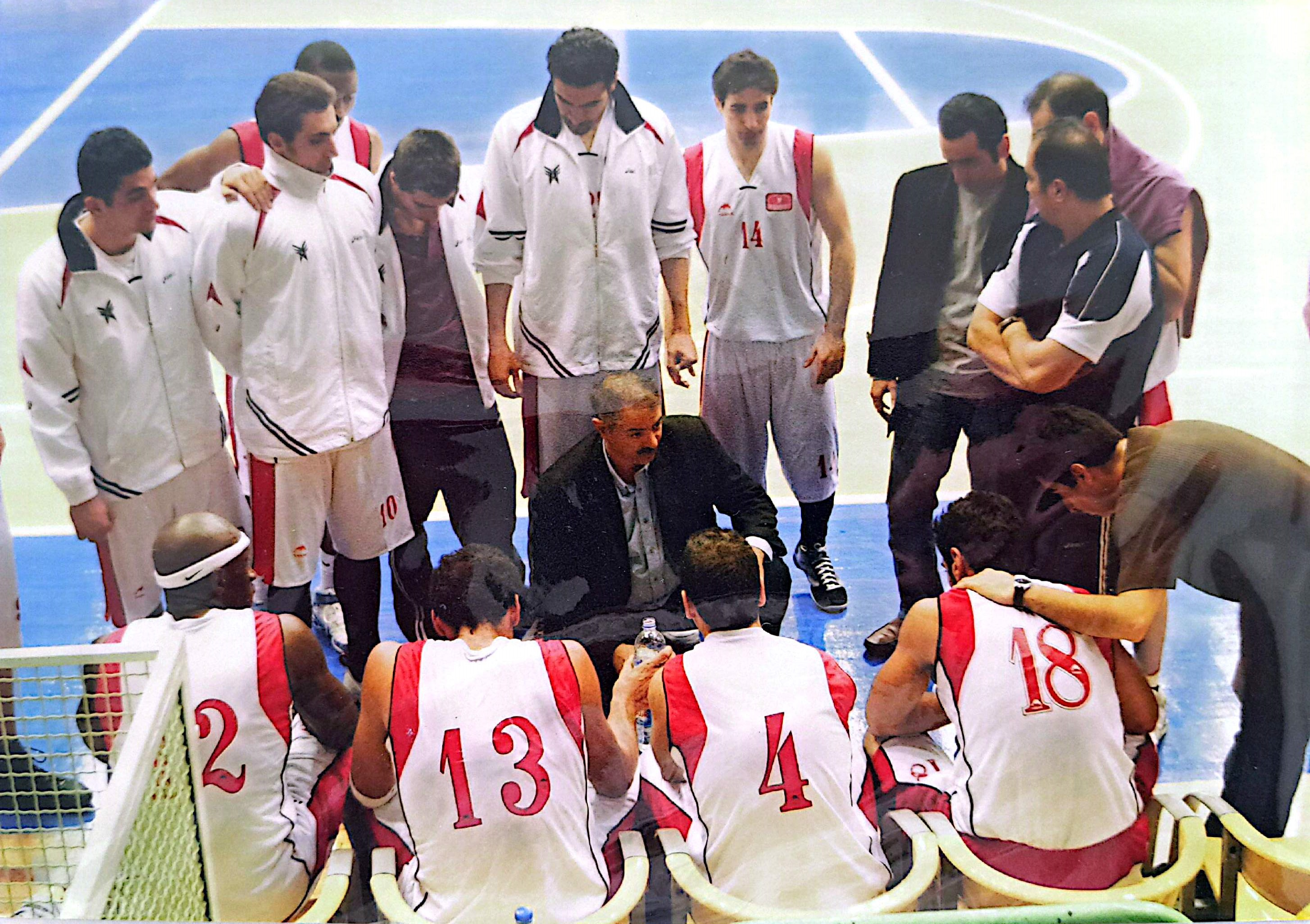

==== Head Coach, University National Team, Iran ====
- 23rd Summer Universiade Games, Izmir, Turkey (2005)
- Asian University Games, Taiwan (2008) – 1st Place
- 24rd Summer Universiade Games, Belgrade, Serbia (2005)

==== Head Coach, Junior National Teams ====
- U19 Tournament, Italy (2012) – 2nd Place
- U18 Asian Championship, Mongolia (2012) – 3rd Place
- U19 world cup, Czech republic, Prage(2013)

=== Club Coaching ===
- Pegah Team – Iran Super League (2004–2007): 5th Place
- Azad University – Iran Super League (2007–2011): 4th Place
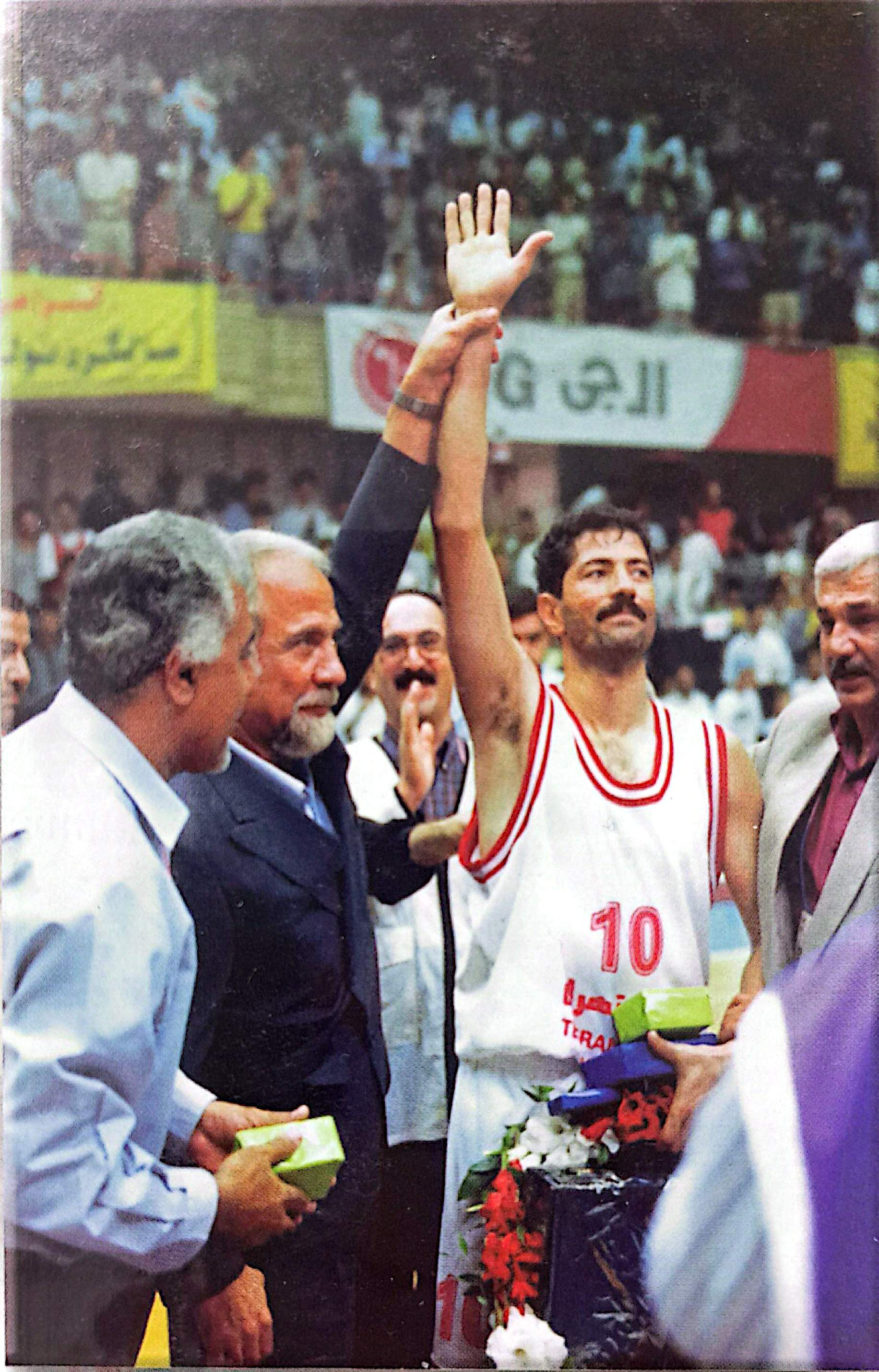
- Petroshimi Bandar Imam - Iran Super League (2012–2015): Champion (2012–13), 3rd Place (2014–15) , Asian Club Championship, Thailand (2018): Champion
- Samen Club – Iran Super League (2015–2016): 5th Place
- Tabriz Municipality – Iran Super League (2016–2018): Champion (2017–2018)
- Zob Ahan Club – Iran Super League (2019–2020)
- Gorgan Municipality – Iran Super League (2021–2023): Champion (three consecutive seasons)
- FIBA West Asia WASL Cup, Lebanon (2022–2023): Finalist
- Zob Ahan Club – Iran Super League (2023–2024): 3rd Place
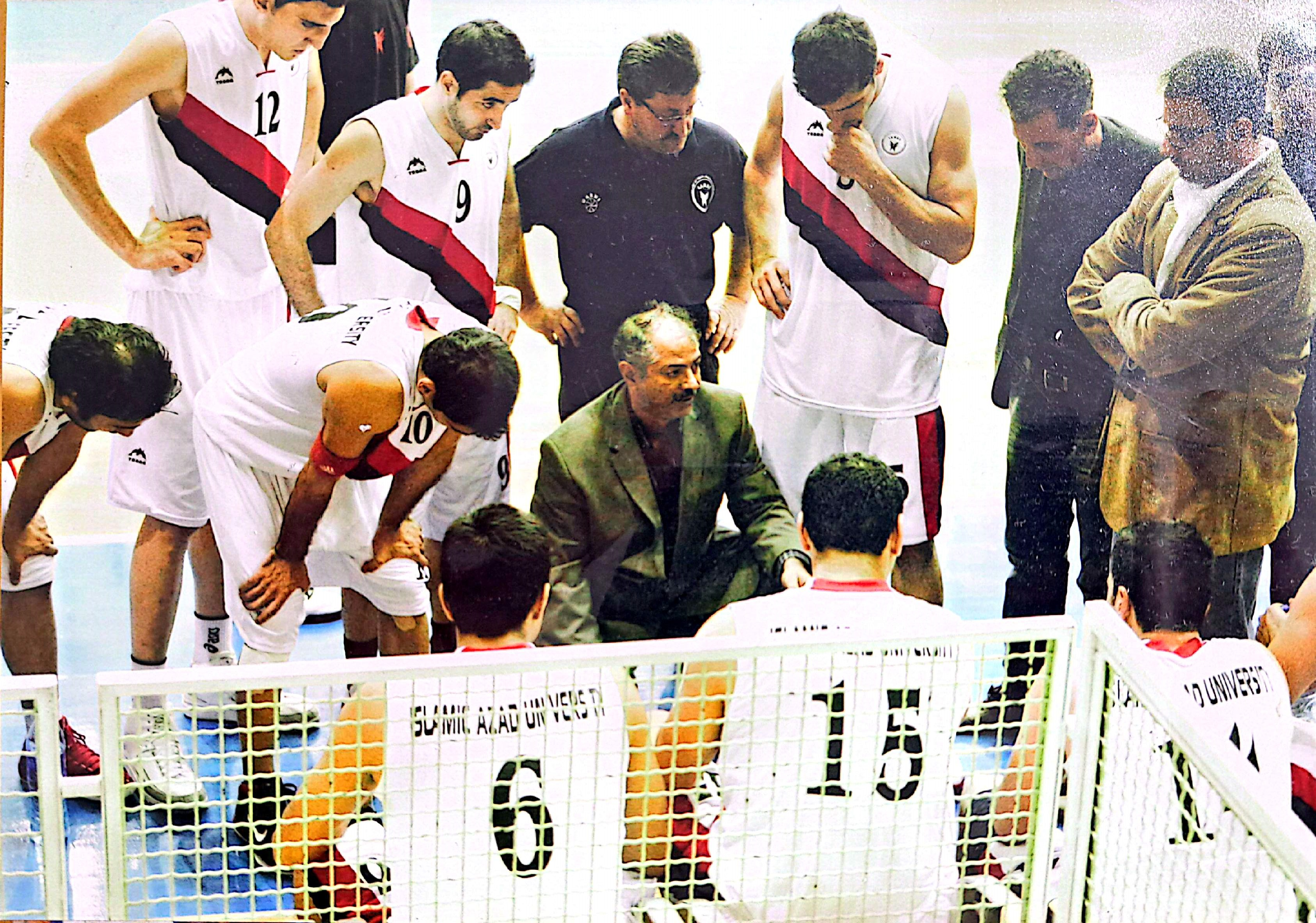
- Kalleh Club – Iran Super League (2024–2025): 3rd Place

== International Coaching Clinics & Education ==
- Olympic Solidarity Courses, International Olympic Committee, Tehran (1998)
- Olympic Solidarity Technical Course for Coaches, Tehran (2002)
- Periodization Workshop for Conditioning Coaches, Tehran (2004)
- University Coaching Clinic, Villanova University, USA (2010)
- International Coaching Enrichment Certificate Program (ICECP), USA (2010)

=== FIBA Coaching Clinics ===
- Istanbul, Turkey (2010)
- Prague, Czech Republic (2013)
- 11th International Coaching Clinic, Istanbul, Turkey (2018)
- Advanced Basketball Coaching Clinic, Tehran (2015)
- American Youth Basketball Development Camp, Istanbul, Turkey (2018)
- Canada Basketball T2C Planning, T2C skills, T2C Strategies, Vancouver (2023)
