= Norvel Pelle =

Lebanese-Antiguan basketball player

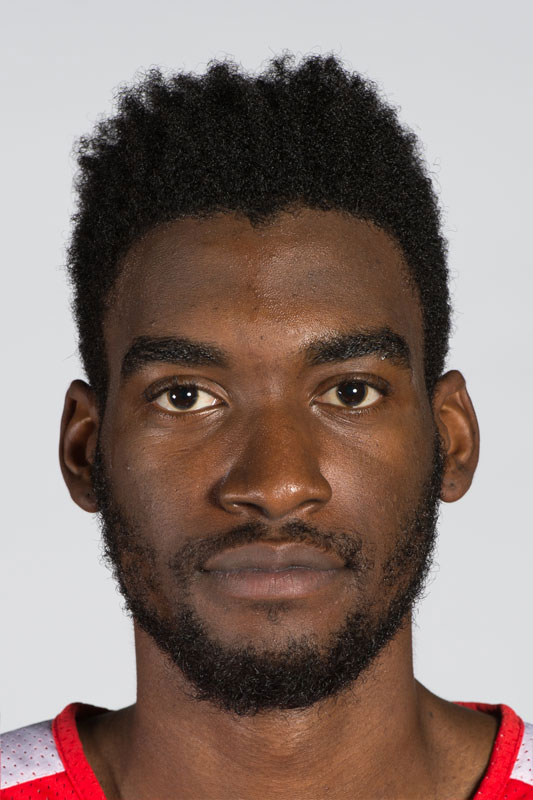
- Pelle with Pallacanestro Varese in 2016

Free agent
- Position: Center

Personal information
- Born: February 3, 1993 (age 33) St. John's, Antigua and Barbuda
- Listed height: 6 ft 10 in (2.08 m)
- Listed weight: 231 lb (105 kg)

Career information
- High school: Lakewood (Lakewood, California); Manuel Dominguez (Compton, California); Price (Los Angeles, California)
- NBA draft: 2014: undrafted
- Playing career: 2013–present

Career history
- 2013–2014: Delaware 87ers
- 2014–2015: Dacin Tigers
- 2015: Delaware 87ers
- 2015–2016: Homenetmen
- 2016–2018: Varese
- 2018: Auxilium Torino
- 2018–2019: Delaware 87ers
- 2019: Homenetmen
- 2019–2020: Philadelphia 76ers
- 2019–2020: →Delaware Blue Coats
- 2021: Brooklyn Nets
- 2021: Canton Charge
- 2021: Sacramento Kings
- 2021: New York Knicks
- 2021–2022: Cleveland Charge
- 2022: Utah Jazz
- 2022: Cleveland Charge
- 2022–2023: Fort Wayne Mad Ants
- 2023–2024: Shahrdari Gorgan
- 2024–2025: Beirut Club
- 2025: Knox Raiders

Career highlights
- NBA G League All-Defensive Team (2019); Italian LBA Blocks Leader (2017); Basketball Champions League Blocks Leader (2017); Lebanese Basketball League Blocks Leader (2016); Lebanese Basketball League Rebounding Leader (2016); Super Basketball League All-Star (2015)
- Stats at NBA.com
- Stats at Basketball Reference

Norvel Pelle Jr. (born February 3, 1993) is a Lebanese-Antiguan professional basketball player who last played for the Knox Raiders of the NBL1 South. A 6-foot-10-inch (2.08 m), 231-pound (105 kg) center, he played at three different high schools in the Los Angeles area and was ranked as one of the top recruits in his class. He was prohibited from competing in college after failing to meet academic requirements, choosing to immediately turn professional in 2013.

Pelle spent his rookie year with the Delaware 87ers of the NBA Development League. He then moved to the Dacin Tigers in Taiwan, where he was named an All-Star, and returned to the 87ers at the end of the season. In 2015, Pelle joined Lebanese club Homenetmen Beirut, leading the league in blocks. In the next season, he began a two-year stint with Pallacanestro Varese in Italy, closing the 2017–18 season with Auxilium Torino. Pelle has played in the NBA for the Philadelphia 76ers, Brooklyn Nets, Sacramento Kings, New York Knicks, and Utah Jazz.

He holds Antiguan, American, and Lebanese citizenship, and has experience with the Lebanon national basketball team.

== Early life ==
Pelle was born in St. John's, Antigua and Barbuda, to Norvel Sr. and Darlene Pelle. When Pelle was three years old, his family moved to Saint Croix in the United States Virgin Islands, and when he was seven, they moved to United States for better work opportunities. His father was a welder, while his mother managed the garden center at a Home Depot store.

== High school career ==
In his freshman season, Pelle played basketball for Lakewood High School in Lakewood, California, where he was touted as one of the top recruits in his class. His school was located near his family's residence in Long Beach, California. As a sophomore, Pelle transferred to Manuel Dominguez High School in Compton, California, playing under head coach Duane Cooper. After Cooper was dismissed from the team, Pelle revealed plans to move to a different high school program. He moved to Frederick K. C. Price High School in Los Angeles but was sidelined for his junior season due to transfer rules. Despite his absence, the team won the CIF Southern Section Division 4AA championship, led by Allen Crabbe and Richard Solomon. With three games left in his senior campaign, Pelle was averaging 15 points, 10 rebounds, and 5 blocks per game.

In his high school career, Pelle was ranked as high as the No. 1 center in his class by recruiting service Rivals. He was rated a four-star recruit by ESPN and 247Sports. Despite his success on the court, he struggled in the classroom, achieving only a 2.6 grade-point average and failing to meet college entrance exam requirements two times. After joining St. John's at the NCAA Division I level, he was ruled ineligible for taking summer classes at Northeast Preparatory School in Philadelphia. He decommitted from the program, signing a letter of intent with Iona, but was again ruled academically ineligible. He then played for Los Angeles College Preparatory Academy.

== Professional career ==
=== Delaware 87ers (2013–2014) ===
After ultimately skipping college, Pelle entered the 2013 NBA draft, attempting to become the first draftee without college or international experience since 2005. However, he withdrew days prior because of severe blisters and warts on his foot that had to be surgically removed. Later in the year, he was selected as the sixth overall pick at the 2013 NBA Development League draft by the Delaware 87ers. In the 2013–14 season with the 87ers, Pelle averaged 5.5 points, 3.1 rebounds, and 1.4 blocks in 13.1 minutes per game. He scored a season-high 18 points on December 11, 2013, against the Idaho Stampede.

=== Dacin Tigers (2014–2015) ===
On July 29, 2014, Pelle signed with the Dacin Tigers of the Taiwanese Super Basketball League (SBL). In 30 games with the team, he averaged 15.3 points and 14.2 rebounds. Pelle had a notable performance in December 2014 versus Kinmen Kaoliang Liquor Basketball, posting a double-double of 27 points and 26 rebounds. He was named to the SBL All-Star Game and earned All-SBL honorable mention accolades from basketball website Asia-Basket.

=== Return to the 87ers (2015) ===
On March 10, 2015, Pelle returned to the Delaware 87ers of the NBA Development League but played only four games in the 2014–15 season. His best performance came on March 20 against the Erie BayHawks, recording 10 points, 5 rebounds, and 4 blocks. He averaged 5.3 points, 3.0 rebounds, and 2.3 blocks per game.

=== Homenetmen Beirut (2015–2016) ===
On December 14, 2015, Pelle signed with Homenetmen Beirut of the Lebanese Basketball League. On January 20, 2016, Pelle only scored 3 points but grabbed 23 rebounds in a 96–88 win over the Al Moutahed. After 32 games, he averaged 11.8 points, 12.7 rebounds, and a league-high 2.9 blocks per game.

Pelle joined the Miami Heat of the National Basketball Association (NBA) at the 2016 Orlando Pro Summer League.

=== Varese (2016–2018) ===
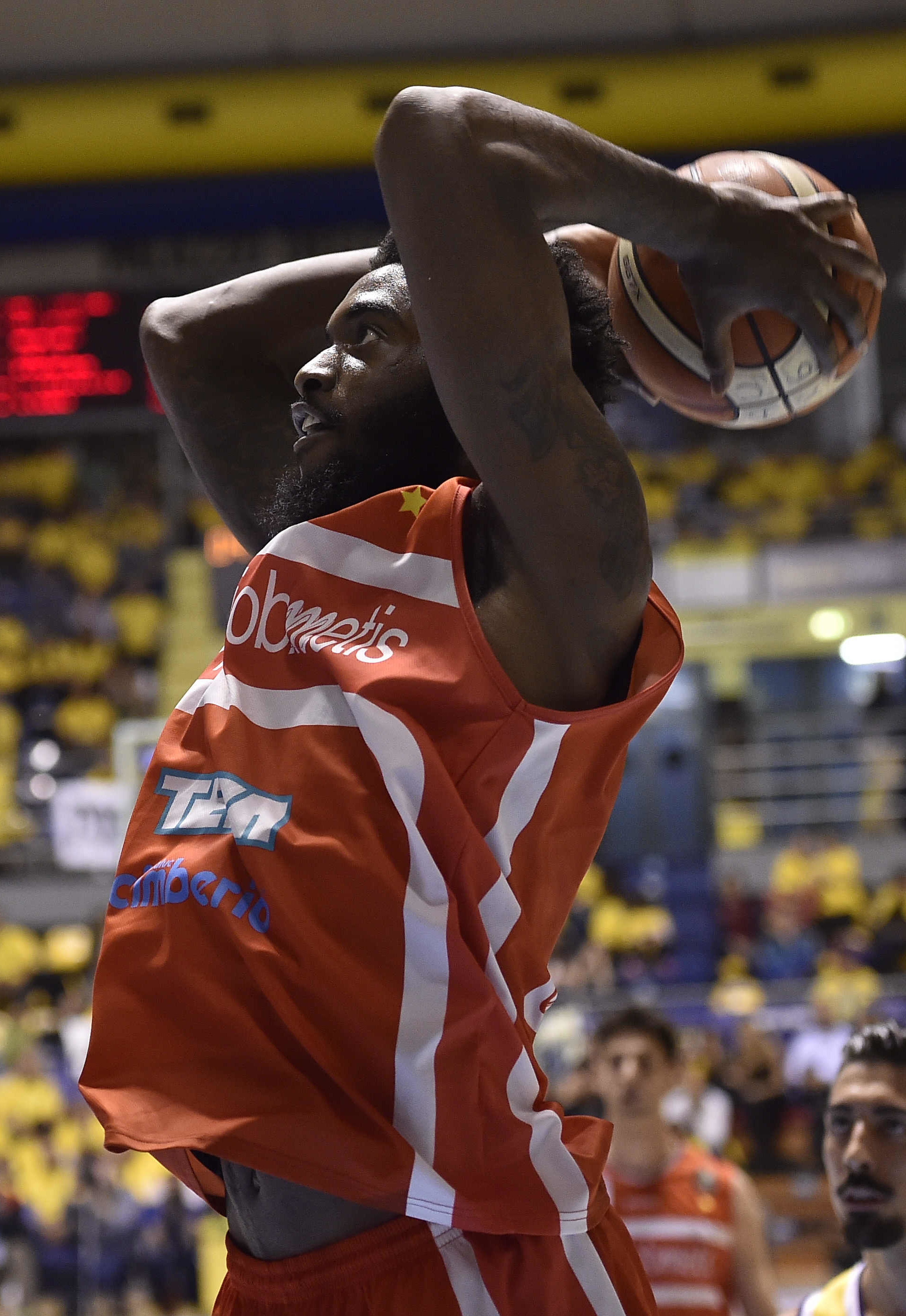
Pelle dunks for Pallacanestro Varese in May 2017

On July 28, 2016, Pelle signed a two-year contract with Pallacanestro Varese of the Italian Lega Basket Serie A (LBA). Upon his arrival, head coach Paolo Moretti said, "The qualities of Pelle that have most impressed me are his explosive strength, aggressiveness and athleticism."

Pelle played for the Miami Heat at the 2017 NBA Summer League in both Orlando and Las Vegas.

=== Auxilium Torino (2018) ===
On February 13, 2018, Pelle signed with Auxilium Pallacanestro Torino for the remainder of the 2017–18 season.

=== Delaware Blue Coats (2018–2019) ===
After the season concluded, Pelle competed for the Philadelphia 76ers at 2018 NBA Summer League in Las Vegas, averaging 7.4 points, 4.2 rebounds, and 1.2 blocks per game through five contests. He later joined the 76ers for training camp. On October 10, 2018, Pelle was waived. He signed with the Delaware Blue Coats for their training camp roster. On January 23, 2019, Pelle was suspended for five games without pay for violating the G League's Anti-Drug program.

=== Homenetmen Beirut (2019) ===
On March 30, 2019, Pelle signed with Homenetmen Beirut of the Lebanese Basketball League for the remainder of the season.

=== Philadelphia 76ers (2019–2020) ===
On July 2, 2019, Pelle signed with the Philadelphia 76ers with a two-way contract. On February 7, 2020, his deal was converted to a standard contract.

=== Canton Charge (2021) ===
On December 19, 2020, Pelle was signed and then waived by the Cleveland Cavaliers.

On January 22, 2021, Pelle was included in roster of the Canton Charge.

=== Brooklyn Nets (2021) ===
On January 28, 2021, Pelle signed with the Brooklyn Nets, but was later waived by the Nets on February 16 after appearing in three games.

=== Return to the Charge (2021) ===
Pelle was officially re-acquired by the Canton Charge on February 21, 2021.

=== Sacramento Kings (2021) ===
On February 25, 2021, Pelle signed a 10-day contract with the Sacramento Kings.

=== New York Knicks (2021) ===
On April 2, 2021, Pelle signed a 10-day contract with the New York Knicks. On April 12, he signed a second 10-day contract. On April 22, Pelle signed a multi-year deal with the Knicks. On July 31, the Knicks waived Pelle.

=== Third stint with the Charge (2021) ===
On November 15, 2021, Pelle signed with the Cleveland Charge as a returning player.

On December 25, 2021, Pelle was signed to a 10-day contract by the Boston Celtics. However, he never played a game for Boston.

=== Utah Jazz (2022) ===
On January 7, 2022, the Utah Jazz signed Pelle to a 10-day contract. He appeared in three games for the Jazz.

=== Fourth stint with the Charge (2022) ===
On January 20, 2022, the Cleveland Charge announced that they reacquired Pelle after his 10-day contract with the Jazz finished.

=== Fort Wayne Mad Ants (2022–2023) ===
During the 2022 NBA preseason, Pelle spent time with the Portland Trail Blazers and the Indiana Pacers.

In October 2022, Pelle joined the Fort Wayne Mad Ants. Pelle was traded to the Capitanes de la Ciudad de México on February 14, 2023, but didn't play for them.

=== Shahrdari Gorgan (2023–2024) ===
On September 8, 2023, Pelle signed with Shahrdari Gorgan of the Iranian Basketball Super League.

=== Beirut Club (2024–2025) ===
On July 19, 2024, Pelle signed with Beirut Club of the Lebanese Basketball League.

=== Homenetmen (2026) ===
In April 2025, Pelle joined the Knox Raiders of the NBL1 South for the 2025 season. He averaged 12.17 points and 6.58 rebounds in 12 games played.

== National team career ==
Pelle is a citizen of Antigua and Barbuda, Lebanon, and the United States but represents Lebanon at the international level. He debuted for them at the 2017 FIBA Asia Cup, averaging 9.3 points, 5.0 rebounds, and 4.0 blocks per game, en route to a 6th-place finish. Against the Philippines, he nearly recorded a triple-double with 23 points, 13 rebounds, and 9 blocks. He wears #12 in the Lebanese national team.

== Career statistics ==
Legend
GP	Games played	GS	Games started	MPG	Minutes per game
FG%	Field goal percentage	3P%	3-point field goal percentage	FT%	Free throw percentage
RPG	Rebounds per game	APG	Assists per game	SPG	Steals per game
BPG	Blocks per game	PPG	Points per game	**Bold**	Career high

=== Regular season ===
Year	Team	GP	GS	MPG	FG%	3P%	FT%	RPG	APG	SPG	BPG	PPG
2019–20	Philadelphia	**24**	0	**9.7**	.521	.000	.500	**3.0**	.3	**.1**	**1.3**	2.4
2020–21	Brooklyn	3	0	9.3	.429	.000	.000	2.3	.0	.0	1.0	2.0
2020–21	Sacramento	1	0	4.0	.000	.000	**.750**	1.0	**1.0**	.0	.0	**3.0**
2020–21	New York	9	0	5.8	**.714**	.000	.500	1.2	.1	**.1**	.7	1.2
2021–22	Utah	3	0	6.3	.600	.000	.000	2.0	.0	.0	.3	2.0
Career		40	0	8.4	.529	.000	.550	2.4	.3	.1	1.0	2.1

=== Playoffs ===
Year	Team	GP	GS	MPG	FG%	3P%	FT%	RPG	APG	SPG	BPG	PPG
2020	Philadelphia	1	0	6.5	.000	.000	.000	.0	.0	1.0	1.0	.0
Career		1	0	6.5	.000	.000	.000	.0	.0	1.0	1.0	.0
