= Oh Se-keun =

South Korean basketball player

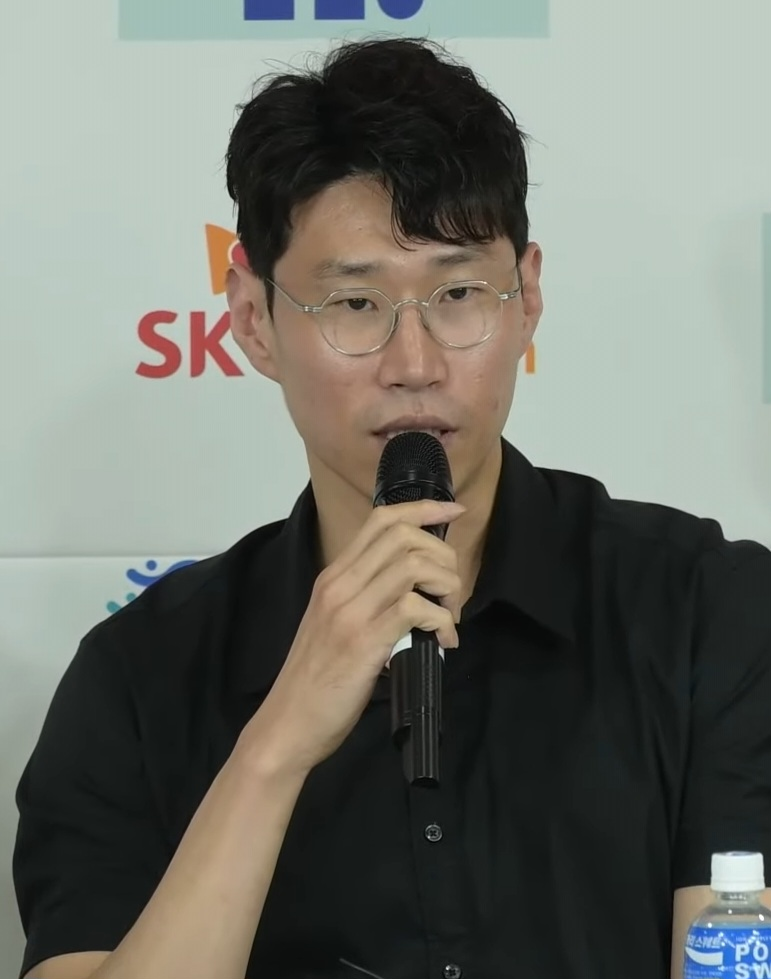

No. 41 – Seoul SK Knights
- Position: Center
- League: KBL

Personal information
- Born: May 20, 1987 (age 39) Incheon, South Korea
- Listed height: 6 ft 7 in (2.01 m)
- Listed weight: 232 lb (105 kg)

Career information
- High school: Jemulpo High School
- College: Chung-Ang University
- KBL draft: 2011: 1st round, 1st overall pick
- Playing career: 2011–present

Career history
- 2011–2023: Anyang KGC
- 2014: → Sangmu (military service)
- 2023–present: Seoul SK Knights

Career highlights
- 4× KBL champion (2012, 2017, 2021, 2023); KBL regular season champion (2017); KBL Rookie of the Year Award (2012); 2× KBL Playoffs MVP (2012, 2017); KBL Most Valuable Player Award (2017); 3× KBL Best 5 (2012, 2017, 2018); 2017 FIBA Asia Cup All-Tournament Team
Medals
Men's basketball
Representing South Korea
Asian Games
Gold medal – first place	2014 Incheon	Team
Silver medal – second place	2010 Guangzhou	Team
FIBA Asia Cup
Bronze medal – third place	2011 China
Bronze medal – third place	2017 Lebanon

- Oh Se-keun
- Hangul: 오세근
- Hanja: 吳世根
- RR: O Segeun
- MR: O Segŭn

Oh Se-keun (born 20 May 1987) is a South Korean professional basketball player who plays for Anyang KGC in the Korean Basketball League. Once a mainstay of the South Korean national team, he was a member of the gold medal-winning team at the 2014 Asian Games. Oh is the first South Korean player to record a quadruple-double in any domestic officially-sanctioned adult basketball competition, whether at college or senior level.

== Early life ==
Oh attended Jemulpo High School in Incheon and captained the basketball team. He was named tournament MVP after leading his team to win the President's Cup and putting up 26 points and 26 assists in the finals.

== Career ==
=== College ===
Oh played for Chung-Ang University, where one of his contemporaries and best friends was fellow Incheon native Kim Sun-hyung. The duo were responsible for Chung-Ang's record-breaking run of 52 consecutive wins (from November 2008 to November 2009). During his senior year, Chung-Ang made history by winning every single game in the newly-established U-League to win the regular season title. That season, he recorded a quadruple-double against Sangmyung University and played a major role in Chung-Ang winning a record fifth consecutive MBC Cup.

=== Professional ===
Oh was drafted by Anyang KGC, the first overall pick of the 2011 KBL rookie draft. At that time, Anyang had a relatively young and inexperienced squad consisting of guard Kim Tae-sul, 2010 draftees Lee Jung-hyun and Park Chan-hee and forward Yang Hee-jong, who had just been discharged from the Sangmu team. They came up against regular season champions Wonju Dongbu Promy in the playoff final and managed to win four out of six games. In Game 6, Oh was the main force behind KGC's comeback from a 17-point deficit to win the game against a Dongbu team which boasted the league's best defensive record. He became the youngest player and only the second rookie (first-year player) to be named Play-off MVP. He averaged 15.0 points in 52 games and was voted KBL Rookie of the Year.

In April 2014, Oh enlisted for mandatory military service and was assigned to the Sangmu team after completing basic training. He was a member of the team which won gold at the 2014 Asian Games. As a result, he was given an early discharge and he returned to his team in time for the 2014-15 season.

In October 2015, the KBL announced the police investigations into over a dozen players and their involvement in an illegal gambling site. Oh, Kim Sun-hyung and several other fellow Chung-Ang University alumni were found to have been involved as college students but never engaged in any gambling-related activities ever since. The prosecution dropped its charges against them and they were instead punished by the KBL. They were ordered by the KBL disciplinary committee to pay a fine of 5% of their annual salary, suspended for 20 games and required to serve 120 hours of community service.

During the 2016-17 season, Oh was an integral part of the team which won both the regular season title and the KBL Championship. In October, he became only the second domestic player to achieve a "20–20" in points and rebounds, recording 28 points and 20 rebounds against Incheon Electroland Elephants. He was voted KBL Most Valuable Player, beating Lee. He was also named Male Basketball Player of the Year, voted by KBL managers and fellow players, at the annual Dong-a Sports Awards honoring domestic professional athletes across all disciplines. With his initial contract coming to an end that season, it was speculated that he would become a free agent and join another club like Lee did. He chose to re-sign after successful contract negotiations.

Despite the departures of Lee and other key players from the championship-winning team, Oh continued to play an integral role by contributing points in the double digits, his efforts being recognized by being awarded with the MVP of the Round award twice. Up until his until his ankle injury in the play-offs, he had led the league with 18.7 points and was playing at least 30 minutes per game on average. Anyang KGC lacked substitute options due to injury and poor form. As a result they lost to Wonju DB Promy in the semi-final rounds. He missed out on the KBL MVP Award to Doo Kyung-min but was voted Male Basketball Player of the Year at the Dong-a Sports Awards, the second consecutive time he has won it.

Oh's playing time was more carefully controlled due to his physical condition and he was often played during important games. During the 2021–22 season, he reached the milestone of 5000 career points, becoming the team's all-time points leader. He and captain Yang Hee-jong, dubbed "Playoff Kings" for their experience, were crucial in a 3–0 sweep of Daegu KOGAS Pegasus in the quarterfinal series and overcoming league runners-up Suwon KT Sonicboom in the semifinals. Although Anyang lost to Seoul SK Knights, he posted his best scoring statistic in the playoffs, averaging 18.7 points.

=== National team ===
Oh made his senior national team debut at the qualifiers for the 2008 Olympics. He also competed for the team at the FIBA Asia Championship 2009. At the FIBA Asia Championship 2009, Oh helped the Koreans to a seventh-place finish while averaging a 10.6 points and 6.2 rebounds per game. In his most extensive action of the tournament, he dominated Philippines in the seventh-place game, where he scored a tournament-high 31 points and grabbed a game-high 10 rebounds. Despite his efforts, Korea failed to qualify for the semifinals of the tournament for the first time in their 25 tournament appearances.

Oh and his college teammate Kim Sun-hyung were both called up for the 2010 Asian Games, the only college students in the final tournament squad. He was temporarily released by the Sangmu team to the national team after being selected for 2014 Asian Games. As they won gold, the members who had yet to serve their mandatory military service were granted exemptions. Oh had already enlisted and was granted an early discharge instead.

Oh's good form during the 2016–17 season led to a call-up for the 2017 FIBA Asia Cup and he was named team captain ahead of the tournament. He averaged 16.0 points and 5.7 rebounds, having played in all seven games of South Korea's campaign leading up to their third-place win. His field goal percentage of 62.3% was second among all players. He was named in the tournament's All-Star Team in the power forward position.

Oh was expected to be part of the 2018 Asian Games squad to defend the gold medal due to his good form in the KBL. However, the injury he sustained during the 2017-18 season playoffs required surgery and he was not selected. He was selected in 2019 for the pre-World Cup selection training camp but pulled out due to a knee injury.

== Player profile ==
In a league where centers are mostly foreign players, Oh has been able to maintain his place as a key player for over a decade. Early in his career, he was known for his dominance in the air and ballhandling skills, rare for a player of his height and physique. His multi-faceted playing style was evident by the fact that he was the first domestic player in any officially-sanctioned adult competition to record a quadruple-double; no domestic player has achieved the feat even at senior level during the pre-KBL amateur era. As chronic plantar fasciitis limited his ability to jump and physically compete with much larger foreign players, he adapted his game by utilizing his experience and ballhandling skills, leading to him being switched to the forward position occasionally.

== Personal life ==
Oh is married to former flight attendant Kang Min-ju. They have three children: a pair of fraternal twins (born 2016) and a younger son (born 2017).

Oh has suffered from plantar fasciitis since his college days and manages the pain with a strict training regimen.
