= Ren Junfei =

Chinese basketball player

Ren Junfei 任骏飞
Guangdong Southern Tigers
- Position: assistant coach
- League: CBA

Personal information
- Born: February 4, 1990 (age 36) Taiyuan, Shanxi, China
- Listed height: 6 ft 8 in (2.03 m)
- Listed weight: 210 lb (95 kg)

Career information
- Playing career: 2009–2025

Career history

Playing
- 2009–2025: Guangdong Southern Tigers

Coaching
- 2024–2025: Guangdong Southern Tigers (assistant)
- 2026–present: Guangdong Southern Tigers (assistant)

Ren Junfei (born February 4, 1990) is a Chinese former professional basketball player who played for the Guangdong Southern Tigers of the Chinese Basketball Association (CBA). He is currently working with the team as an assistant coach, following his retirement. As a player he represented China's national basketball team at the 2017 FIBA Asia Cup in Zouk Mikael, Lebanon, where he recorded most minutes and steals for China. Ren was included in China's squad for the 2023 FIBA Basketball World Cup qualification.
