= Ali Mezher =

Lebanese basketball player (born 1994)

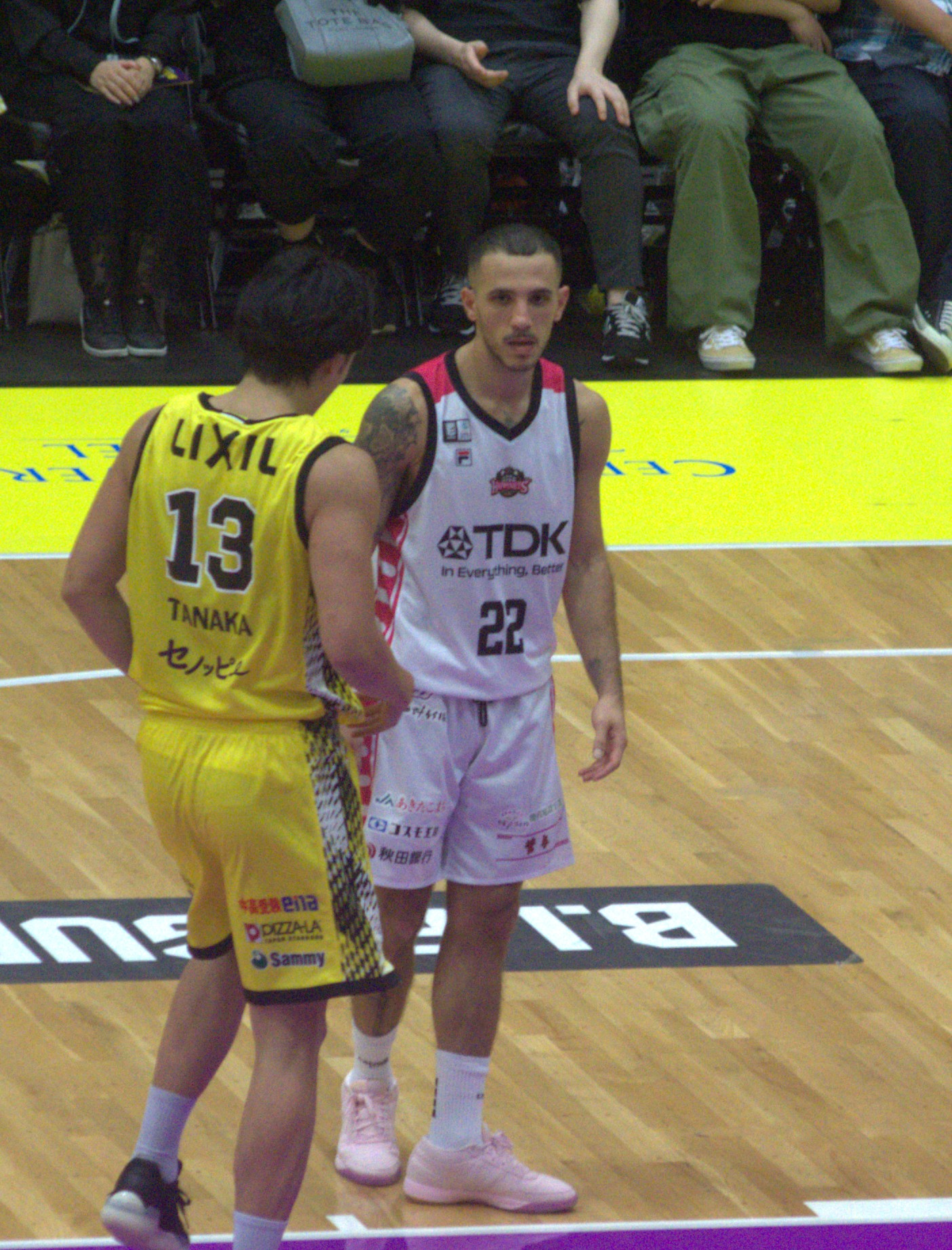

No. 25 – Sagesse SC
- Position: Point guard
- League: Lebanese Basketball League

Personal information
- Born: March 22, 1994 (age 32) Beirut, Lebanon
- Listed height: 1.83 m (6 ft 0 in)

Career information
- Playing career: 2013–present

Career history
- 2013–2017: Hoops Club
- 2017–2018: Sagesse SC
- 2018–2019: Champville SC
- 2020–2023: Sagesse SC
- 2023–2025: Beirut Club
- 2025–2026: Akita Northern Happinets
- 2026–present: Sagesse SC

Ali Mezher (born 22 March 1994 in Beirut) is a Lebanese professional basketball player for Sagesse Club in the Lebanese Basketball League (LBL). Internationally, he represents the Lebanese national team, and he is a WABA (West Asian Basketball) champion from 2017.

In the 2016–2017 season, Ali played for Hoops Club and averaged 18 points, 8 assists, 4 rebounds, and 1.5 steals, then signed a contract with Sagesse for the 2017–2018 season. He joined Champville SC the following summer, but returned to Sagesse Club just a year later.
