= Kim Sun-hyung =

South Korean basketball player

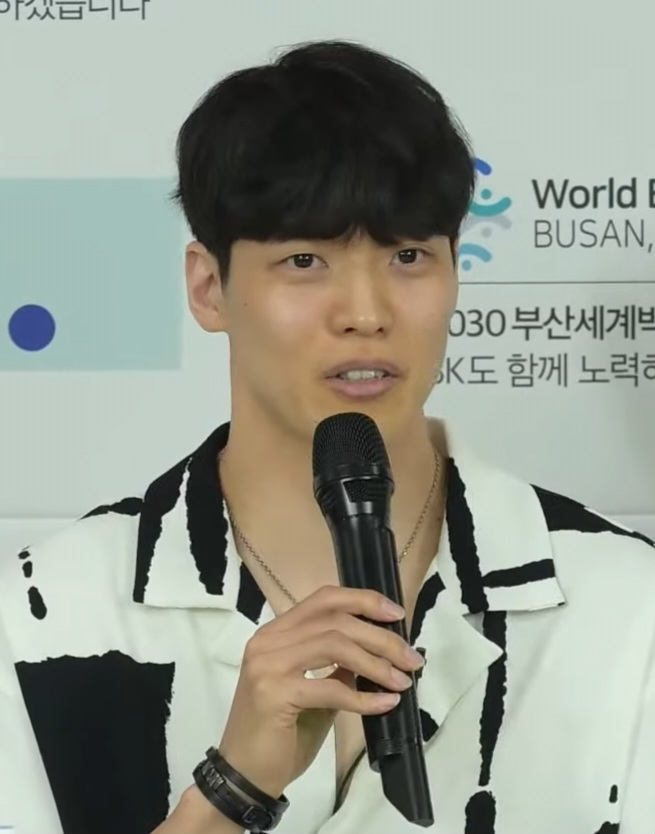

Suwon KT Sonicboom
- Position: Guard
- League: KBL

Personal information
- Born: July 1, 1988 (age 38) Incheon, South Korea
- Listed height: 6 ft 2 in (1.88 m)
- Listed weight: 179 lb (81 kg)

Career information
- High school: Songdo High School
- College: Chung-Ang University
- KBL draft: 2011: 1st round, 2nd overall pick
- Playing career: 2011–present

Career history
- 2011–2025: Seoul SK Knights
- 2025-: Suwon KT Sonicboom

Career highlights
- KBL Championship (2018); KBL regular season champion (2013); KBL Most Valuable Player Award (2013)
Medals
Men's basketball
Representing South Korea
Asian Games
Gold medal – first place	2014 Incheon	Team
FIBA Asia Cup
Bronze medal – third place	2013 Manila
Bronze medal – third place	2017 Beirut
William Jones Cup
Silver medal – second place	2016 Taipei

- Kim Sun-hyung
- Hangul: 김선형
- Hanja: 金善亨
- RR: Gim Seonhyeong
- MR: Kim Sŏnhyŏng

Kim Sun-hyung (born July 1, 1988) is a South Korean professional basketball player. He plays for Seoul SK Knights in the Korean Basketball League and the South Korean national team.

== Early life ==
A native of Incheon, Kim initially harbored dreams of becoming a football player and played football through elementary school. He only switched to basketball in middle school, relatively late compared to many of his KBL counterparts, and then attended Songdo High School, the city's top basketball school.

== Career ==
=== College ===
Kim played college basketball for Chung-Ang University, where he was teammates with future KBL MVP Oh Se-keun and roommates with Lee Dae-sung. During his senior year, he was named the U League regular season MVP.

=== Professional ===
Kim was drafted by Seoul SK Knights second at the 2011 KBL rookie draft, behind Oh. He quickly established himself, averaging 14.94 points, 3.5 assists in his debut season.

During the 2012-13 season, Kim established himself as a mainstay of the Knights team which won the regular season title. He won MVP of the Month (later changed to MVP of the Round) three times and was also voted KBL Most Valuable Player, averaging 12.08 points, 4.9 assists and 2.9 rebounds.

In October 2015, the KBL announced the police investigations into over a dozen players and their involvement in an illegal gambling site. Kim, Oh and several other fellow Chung-Ang University alumni were found to have been involved while they were still college students, before turning professional. All were sentenced to 120 hours of community service, fined 5% of their annual salary and suspended for 20 games. However, Kim only served the suspension as he had reported the gambling activities to the KBL before the official investigation and had not been involved in any illegal gambling since turning professional.

Two games into the 2017-18 season, Kim injured his ankle and was out for twelve weeks as it required surgery. After returning from injury, he was mostly a substitute and played only nine games in the regular season but played a vital role during the play-offs, especially during the finals against regular season champions Wonju DB Promy. Seoul SK Knights won their first championship title in twelve years and it was Kim's first of his career.

The defending champions went into the 2018-19 season struggling with injuries to key players. Prior to the January game against Busan KT Sonicboom, they had been on a 10-game losing streak before Kim scored a career-high 49 points as the Knights came from behind to narrowly win 91-90 in overtime. With the record, he is tied for third place for the most number of points scored by a domestic player in a single game in KBL history.

=== National team ===
Kim participated at the 2014 FIBA Basketball World Cup. He was a member of the gold medal-winning team at the 2014 Asian Games, which meant that he was exempted from mandatory military service.

== Personal life ==
Kim married his girlfriend of two years Seok Hae-ji in May 2017.
