= Ivan Todorović (basketball) =

Montenegrin-Syrian basketball player

Personal information
- Born: January 17, 1984 (age 42) Nikšić, SFR Yugoslavia
- Listed height: 2.14 m (7 ft 0 in)

Career information
- Playing career: 2000–2018
- Position: Center

Career history
- 2000–2001: Budućnost
- 2002–2007: Reflex
- 2007–2008: Aigaleo
- 2008: Kalev
- 2008–2009: Helios
- 2010–2011: Lovćen
- 2011–2012: Olimpi Tbilisi
- 2012–2013: U-Mobitelco Cluj-Napoca
- 2013–2014: Monastir
- 2014–2015: Renaissance de Berkane
- 2015: Monte Hermoso
- 2015: Sanaye Petrochimi Mahshahr
- 2016: Kožuv
- 2017: L'Hospitalet
- 2017: Antonine
- 2018: Sutjeska

Ivan Todorović (born January 17, 1984) is a Montenegrin-Syrian former professional basketball player. He played at the center position.

== Professional career ==
During his pro career, Todorović played with numerous club, one of which was Sutjeska.
