= 2019–20 KBL season =

- League: Korean Basketball League
- Season: 2019–20
- Dates: 5 October 2019 – 24 March 2020
- Games played: 42/43 per team
- Teams: 10
- TV partner(s): SPOTV

Regular season
- Season MVP: Heo Hoon (Busan KT Sonicboom)

The 2019-20 KBL season was the 24th season of the Korean Basketball League (KBL), the highest level of basketball in South Korea. Ulsan Hyundai Mobis Phoebus was the defending champion.

On 24 March 2020, the KBL decided to cancel the remainder of the season because of the COVID-19 pandemic. Initially some games in February were played behind closed doors but, as with other domestic sports leagues, government restrictions forced the KBL to forfeit the rest of the season. Hence there was no Play-offs MVP awarded this season.

The KBL, as it announced the cancellation of the remainder of the regular season and the playoffs, said no champions would be crowned this season. The Seoul SK Knights and the Wonju DB Promy went into the record books as the co-first-placed teams in the regular season.

== Clubs ==
Team	City	Arena	Capacity	Founded	Joined
Anyang KGC	Anyang	Anyang Gymnasium	6,690	1992	1997
Busan KT Sonicboom	Busan	Sajik Arena	14,099	1997	1997
Changwon LG Sakers	Changwon	Changwon Gymnasium	6,000	1994	1997
Goyang Orion Orions	Goyang	Goyang Gymnasium	6,216	1995	1997
Incheon Electroland Elephants	Incheon	Samsan World Gymnasium	7,220	1994	1997
Jeonju KCC Egis	Jeonju	Jeonju Gymnasium	4,730	1977	1997
Seoul Samsung Thunders	Seoul	Jamsil Arena	11,069	1978	1997
Seoul SK Knights	Seoul	Jamsil Students' Gymnasium	6,229	1997	1997
Ulsan Hyundai Mobis Phoebus	Ulsan	Dongchun Gymnasium	5,831	1986	1997
Wonju DB Promy	Wonju	Wonju Gymnasium	4,600	1996	1997

== Regular season ==
Pos	Team	G	W	L	PCT	Qualification
1	Seoul SK Knights	43	28	15	0.651	Semi-finals
2	Wonju DB Promy	43	28	15	0.651	Semi-finals
3	Anyang KGC	43	26	17	0.605	Quarter-finals
4	Jeonju KCC Egis	42	23	19	0.548	Quarter-finals
5	Incheon Electroland Elephants	42	21	21	0.500	Quarter-finals
6	Busan KT Sonicboom	43	21	22	0.488	Quarter-finals
7	Seoul Samsung Thunders	43	19	24	0.442	
8	Ulsan Hyundai Mobis Phoebus	42	18	24	0.429	
9	Changwon LG Sakers	42	16	26	0.381	
10	Goyang Orion Orions	43	13	30	0.302	

== Individual awards ==
=== Yearly awards ===
- Most Valuable Player: Heo Hoon (Busan KT Sonicboom)
- Foreign Player of the Year: Jameel Warney (Seoul SK Knights)
- Coach of the Year: Lee Sang-beom (Wonju DB Promy)
- Rookie of the Year: Kim Hoon (Wonju DB Promy)
- KBL Best 5
  - Heo Hoon (Busan KT Sonicboom)
  - Kim Jong-kyu (Wonju DB Promy)
  - Song Kyo-chang (Jeonju KCC Egis)
  - Jameel Warney (Seoul SK Knights)
  - Cady Lalanne (Changwon LG Sakers)
- Sixth Man Award: Choi Sung-won (Seoul SK Knights)
- Skill Development Award: Kim Nak-hyeon (Incheon Electroland Elephants)
- Defensive Best 5
  - Moon Seong-gon (Anyang KGC)
  - Chinanu Onuaku (Wonju DB Promy)
  - Choi Sung-won (Seoul SK Knights)
  - Lee Seoung-hyun (Goyang Orion Orions)
  - Jang Jae-seok (Goyang Orion Orions)
- Defensive Player of the Year: Moon Seong-gon (Anyang KGC)
- Fair Play Award: Ham Ji-hoon (Ulsan Hyundai Mobis Phoebus)

=== Individual statistic leaders ===
Category	Player	Team	Statistics
PPG (O)	(Haiti) Cady Lalanne	Changwon LG Sakers	21.4
PPG (D)	Song Kyo-chang	Jeonju KCC Egis	15.0
RPG (O)	(United States) (South Korea) Ra Gun-ah	Jeonju KCC Egis	12.5
RPG (D)	Kim Jong-kyu	Changwon LG Sakers	6.1
APG	(South Korea) Heo Hoon	Busan KT Sonicboom	7.2
SPG	(United States) Brandon Brown	Jeonju KCC Egis	2.48
BPG	(South Korea) Moon Seong-gon	Anyang KGC	1.8
FG%	(United States) (South Korea) Ra Gun-ah	Ulsan Hyundai Mobis Phoebus	56.3%
FT%	(South Korea) Kim Si-rae	Changwon LG Sakers	89.1%
3FG%	(Haiti) Cady Lalanne	Changwon LG Sakers	41.6%

=== Round MVP ===
The season was cancelled in the middle of the fifth round. As a result, there was no round MVP awarded for the fifth and sixth rounds. The following players were named MVP of the Round:

- Round 1: Heo Hoon (Busan KT Sonicboom)
- Round 2: Choi Jun-yong (Seoul SK Knights)
- Round 3: Song Kyo-chang (Jeonju KCC Egis)
- Round 4: Doo Kyung-min (Wonju DB Promy)

== Records ==
- On 9 November 2019, Lee Dae-sung set a new record for double-doubles (points and assists, 30 or more points) among domestic players. He scored 30 points and recorded 15 assists. Johnny McDowell holds the overall record, with 36 points and 15 assists.
- On 9 February 2020, Heo Hoon put up 24 points and 21 assists and became the first player in KBL history to achieve the "20–20" in points scored and assists. Previously, the "20–20" record had only been achieved in the categories of scoring and rebounding. Heo's 21 assists is the second highest record for assists achieved in a single game. Kim Seung-hyun holds the all-time record, with 23 assists, but it was achieved in overtime while Heo's record was achieved in regular time.
