= 2018–19 KBL season =

KBL
- Season: 2018–19
- Games played: 54 (6 rounds of 9 games)
- Teams: 10
- TV partner: MBC Sports+

Regular season
- Season MVP: Lee Jung-hyun (Jeonju KCC Egis)

Finals
- Champions: Ulsan Hyundai Mobis Phoebus
- Runners-up: Incheon Electroland Elephants
- Playoffs MVP: Lee Dae-sung (Ulsan Hyundai Mobis Phoebus)

The 2018–19 KBL season was the 23rd season of the Korean Basketball League (KBL), the highest level of basketball in South Korea. The regular season began play on 13 October 2018. Ulsan Hyundai Mobis Phoebus won its seventh KBL championship.

== Regular season ==
Pos	Team	Pld	W	L	PCT	Qualification or relegation
1	Ulsan Hyundai Mobis Phoebus	54	43	11	.796	Qualification to semi-finals
2	Incheon Electroland Elephants	54	35	19	.648	Qualification to semi-finals
3	Changwon LG Sakers	54	30	24	.556	Qualification to quarter-finals
4	Jeonju KCC Egis	54	28	26	.519	Qualification to quarter-finals
5	Goyang Orion Orions	54	27	27	.500	Qualification to quarter-finals
6	Busan KT Sonicboom	54	27	27	.500	Qualification to quarter-finals
7	Anyang KGC	54	25	29	.463	
8	Wonju DB Promy	54	24	30	.444	
9	Seoul SK Knights	54	20	34	.370	
10	Seoul Samsung Thunders	54	11	43	.204	

== Playoffs ==
Quarter-finals
4 Jeonju	3
5 Goyang	1
3 Changwon	3
6 Busan	2

Semi-finals
1 Ulsan	3
4 Jeonju	1
2 Incheon	3
3 Changwon	0

Final
1 Ulsan	4
2 Incheon	1

== Individual awards ==
=== Yearly awards ===
- Most Valuable Player: Lee Jung-hyun (Jeonju KCC Egis)
- Foreign Player of the Year: Ra Gun-ah (Ulsan Hyundai Mobis Phoebus)
- Coach of the Year: Yoo Jae-hak (Ulsan Hyundai Mobis Phoebus)
- Rookie of the Year: Byeon Jun-hyung (Anyang KGC)
- KBL Best 5
  - Lee Jung-hyun (Jeonju KCC Egis)
  - Park Chan-hee (Incheon Electroland Elephants
  - Yang Hong-seok (Busan KT Sonicboom)
  - Ham Ji-hoon (Ulsan Hyundai Mobis Phoebus)
  - Ra Gun-ah (Ulsan Hyundai Mobis Phoebus)
- Sixth Man Award: Kim Nak-hyeon (Incheon Electroland Elephants)
- Skill Development Award: Yang Hong-seok (Busan KT Sonicboom)
- Defensive Best 5
  - Park Chan-hee (Incheon Electroland Elephants)
  - Choi Won-hyuk (Seoul SK Knights)
  - Yang Hee-jong (Anyang KGC)
  - Yun Ho-young (Wonju DB Promy)
  - Ra Gun-ah (Ulsan Hyundai Mobis Phoebus)
- Defensive Player of the Year: Park Chan-hee (Incheon Electroland Elephants)
- Fair Play Award: Yang Dong-geun (Ulsan Hyundai Mobis Phoebus)

=== Individual statistic leaders ===
Category	Player	Team	Statistics
PPG (O)	(United States) (Central African Republic) James Mays	Changwon LG Sakers	26.8
PPG (D)	Lee Jung-hyun	Jeonju KCC Egis	16.5
RPG (O)	(United States) (Central African Republic) James Mays	Changwon LG Sakers	14.7
RPG (D)	Kim Jong-kyu	Changwon LG Sakers	7.4
APG	(South Korea) Park Chan-hee	Incheon Electroland Elephants	5.7
SPG	(United States) Brandon Brown	Jeonju KCC Egis	2.48
BPG	(United States) (South Korea) Ra Gun-ah	Ulsan Hyundai Mobis Phoebus	1.6 (Note: Ra Gun-ah was numerically tied with Eugene Phelps and Lee Jong-hyun but ranked first as he played in more games.)
FG%	(United States) (South Korea) Ra Gun-ah	Ulsan Hyundai Mobis Phoebus	63.3%
FT%	(South Korea) Lee Gwan-hee	Seoul Samsung Thunders	82.0%
3FG%	(South Korea) Yang Dong-geun	Ulsan Hyundai Mobis Phoebus	40.5%

=== Round MVP ===
The following players were named MVP of the Round:

- Round 1: Ra Gun-ah (Ulsan Hyundai Mobis Phoebus)
- Round 2: Yang Hong-seok (Busan KT Sonicboom)
- Round 3: Lee Jung-hyun (Jeonju KCC Egis
- Round 4: Park Chan-hee (Incheon Electroland Elephants)
- Round 5: Giddy Potts (Incheon Electroland Elephants)
- Round 6: Lee Dae-sung (Ulsan Hyundai Mobis Phoebus)

== Records ==
- On 29 January 2019, Yang Hong-seok became the youngest player in KBL history to record a triple-double at age 21 years and 6 months. Joo Hee-jung previously held the record, achieving it at age 23 years.
