= 2020–21 KBL season =

KBL
- Season: 2020–21
- Dates: 9 October 2020 – 6 April 2021
- Games played: 54 per team
- Teams: 10
- TV partner(s): SPOTV

Regular season
- Season MVP: Song Kyo-chang (Jeonju KCC Egis)

Finals
- Champions: Anyang KGC (3rd title)
- Runners-up: Jeonju KCC Egis
- Playoffs MVP: Jared Sullinger (Anyang KGC)

The 2020–21 KBL season was the 25th season of the Korean Basketball League (KBL), the highest level of basketball in South Korea. There was no defending champion as the previous season was cut short towards the end and the play-offs were cancelled.

== Clubs ==
Team	City	Arena	Capacity	Founded	Joined
Anyang KGC	Anyang	Anyang Gymnasium	6,690	1992	1997
Busan KT Sonicboom	Busan	Sajik Arena	14,099	1997	1997
Changwon LG Sakers	Changwon	Changwon Gymnasium	6,000	1994	1997
Goyang Orion Orions	Goyang	Goyang Gymnasium	6,216	1995	1997
Incheon Electroland Elephants	Incheon	Samsan World Gymnasium	7,220	1994	1997
Jeonju KCC Egis	Jeonju	Jeonju Gymnasium	4,730	1977	1997
Seoul Samsung Thunders	Seoul	Jamsil Arena	11,069	1978	1997
Seoul SK Knights	Seoul	Jamsil Students' Gymnasium	6,229	1997	1997
Ulsan Hyundai Mobis Phoebus	Ulsan	Dongchun Gymnasium	5,831	1986	1997
Wonju DB Promy	Wonju	Wonju Gymnasium	4,600	1996	1997

== Regular season ==
Pos	Team	Pld	W	L	PCT	Qualification or relegation
1	Jeonju KCC Egis	54	36	18	.667	Qualification to semi-finals
2	Ulsan Hyundai Mobis Phoebus	54	32	22	.593	Qualification to semi-finals
3	Anyang KGC	54	30	24	.556	Qualification to quarter-finals
4	Goyang Orion Orions	54	28	26	.519	Qualification to quarter-finals
5	Incheon Electroland Elephants	54	27	27	.500	Qualification to quarter-finals
6	Busan KT Sonicboom	54	26	28	.481	Qualification to quarter-finals
7	Seoul Samsung Thunders	54	24	30	.444	
8	Seoul SK Knights	54	24	30	.444	
9	Wonju DB Promy	54	24	30	.444	
10	Changwon LG Sakers	54	19	35	.352	

(Note: Seoul Samsung Thunders, Seoul SK Knights and Wonju DB Promy were tied numerically but ranked accordingly based on their head-to-head records.)

== Playoffs ==
Quarter-finals
4 Goyang	1
5 Incheon	3
3 Anyang	3
6 Busan	0

Semi-finals
1 Jeonju	3
5 Incheon	2
2 Ulsan	0
3 Anyang	3

Final
1 Jeonju	0
3 Anyang	4

== Individual awards ==
=== Yearly awards ===
- Most Valuable Player: Song Kyo-chang (Jeonju KCC Egis)
- Foreign Player of the Year: Shawn Long (Ulsan Hyundai Mobis Phoebus)
- Coach of the Year: Chun Chang-jin (Jeonju KCC Egis)
- Rookie of the Year: Oh Jae-hyun (Seoul SK Knights)
- KBL Best 5
  - Heo Hoon (Busan KT Sonicboom)
  - Song Kyo-chang (Jeonju KCC Egis)
  - Shawn Long (Ulsan Hyundai Mobis Phoebus)
  - Lee Dae-sung (Goyang Orion Orions)
  - Yang Hong-seok (Busan KT Sonicboom)
- Sixth Man Award: Jang Jae-seok (Ulsan Hyundai Mobis Phoebus)
- Most Improved Player: Jung Chang-young (Jeonju KCC Egis)
- Defensive Best 5
  - Moon Seong-gon (Anyang KGC)
  - Lee Seoung-hyun (Goyang Orion Orions)
  - Cha Ba-wee (Incheon Electroland Elephants)
  - Choi Seung-won (Seoul SK Knights)
  - Jang Jae-seok (Ulsan Hyundai Mobis Phoebus)
- Defensive Player of the Year: Moon Seong-gon (Anyang KGC)
- Fair Play Award: Jung Young-sam (Incheon Electroland Elephants)

=== Individual statistic leaders ===
Category	Player	Team	Statistics
PPG(O)	(United States) Shawn Long	Ulsan Hyundai Mobis Phoebus	21.3
PPG(D)	Heo Hoon	Busan KT Sonicboom	15.6
RPG(O)	(United States) Shawn Long	Ulsan Hyundai Mobis Phoebus	10.8
RPG(D)	Yang Hong-seok	Busan KT Sonicboom	6.7
APG	(South Korea) Heo Hoon	Busan KT Sonicboom	7.5
SPG	(South Korea) Lee Dae-sung	Goyang Orion Orions	1.9
BPG	(United States) Isaiah Hicks	Seoul Samsung Thunders	1.5
FG%	(United States) Cliff Alexander	Busan KT Sonicboom	63.3%
FT%	(United States) Nick Minnerath	Seoul SK Knights	83.4%
3FG%	(South Korea) Kim Dong-wook	Seoul Samsung Thunders	43.9%

=== Round MVP ===
The following players were named MVP of the Round:

- Round 1: Kim Nak-hyeon (Incheon Electroland Elephants)
- Round 2: Song Kyo-chang (Jeonju KCC Egis)
- Round 3: Heo Hoon (Busan KT Sonicboom)
- Round 4: Shawn Long (Ulsan Hyundai Mobis Phoebus)
- Round 5: Heo Hoon (Busan KT Sonicboom)
- Round 6: Jared Sullinger (Anyang KGC)

== Records ==
- On 25 March 2021 Song Kyo-chang became the youngest player in KBL history to reach 3000 career points. He had been drafted out of high school in 2015 and is also the first high school graduate to win the regular season MVP.
- Heo Hoon is the first player in KBL history to simultaneously rank first in the statistical categories of scoring (domestic players) and assists (overall).
