= Jung Jae-kun =

South Korean basketball player

Personal information
- Born: 23 July 1969 (age 57) South Korea
- Listed height: 192 cm (6 ft 4 in)

Career information
- College: Yonsei University
- Playing career: 1992–2005
- Position: Forward / center
- Coaching career: 2005–2014

Career history

Playing
- 1992–2000: SBS / Anyang SBS Stars
- 1993–1994: → Sangmu (military service)
- 2000–2005: Daejeon Hyundai Gullivers / Jeonju KCC Egis

Coaching
- 2005–2007: Jeonju KCC Egis (assistant coach)
- 2007–2014: Yonsei University (assistant coach / head coach)

Career highlights
- KBL Championship (2004); KBL Best 5 (1997); Sixth Man Award (2002)

- Jung Jae-kun
- Hangul: 정재근
- Hanja: 鄭再根
- RR: Jeong Jaegeun
- MR: Chŏng Chaegŭn

Jung Jae-kun (born 23 July 1969) is a South Korean retired basketball player. His playing career spanned thirteen years and coincided with the founding of the all-professional Korean Basketball League. Possessing the ability and skillset to play as either a center or a forward, he is credited with paving the way for the "center-forward" swingman to succeed in domestic basketball during an era where such players were often viewed as being strategically difficult to fit into the team's tactics.

== Early years ==
Unlike many of his illustrious contemporaries, Jung did not come from a notable high school basketball program or went to school in Seoul. He grew up in Gyeongnam area and attended Masan High School in the port city of Masan.

== Playing career ==
=== College days ===
Jung moved to Seoul to attend Yonsei University. During his senior year, he was joined by the likes of Lee Sang-min and Moon Kyung-eun. They quickly drew attention when they famously defeated established senior teams such as Kia and Samsung which boasted the era's most notable stars including the "Hur-Dong-Taek Trio" and Kim Hyun-jun.

=== Senior and professional career ===
Jung signed with the Seoul-based semi-professional team of the broadcaster Seoul Broadcasting System (SBS) in 1992. He enlisted for mandatory military service the year after and was assigned to the Sangmu team. He was discharged in November 1994. When the professional league was founded in 1997, the SBS team relocated to Anyang, where it is still located and is now Anyang KGC after changing sponsors. He ranked first in field goal percentage and averaged 21.1 points in 21 games during the first KBL season, only behind Chun Hee-chul. During the 1997–98 and 1998–99 seasons, he was in and out of the starting team due to frequent injuries.

In 2000, Jung signed with Daejeon Hyundai Gullivers, which moved to Jeonju and became Jeonju KCC Egis a year later. He remained with the team until his retirement in 2005. His playing career ended on a bitter note as Jeonju KCC Egis finished runners-up to Wonju TG Sambo Xers in the league and also lost to them in the play-off finals.

During his playing career, Jung was known by the nickname "Grim Reaper" (저승사자, literally "Lion of Death" in Korean). He earned the moniker from opposition players and fans for the feeling of dread they felt whenever he had the ball in his hands due to his shooting accuracy and ability to dunk, which he attributed to his background as a former high jumper.

=== National team ===
He competed in the men's tournament at the 1996 Summer Olympics.

== Coaching career ==
Jung transitioned into coaching after retiring as a player in 2005. He worked under his former national teammate Hur Jae for two seasons.

In 2007 Jung returned to his alma mater Yonsei University as a member of the basketball team coaching staff. From 2011 to 2014, he was head coach.

== Controversy ==
During his time at Jeonju KCC Egis, Jung was remembered for an incident during the 2002–03 season involving his then-teammate Chun Hee-chul. During a January game against Seoul Samsung Thunders. Chun was intentionally struck in the face by Park Sung-hoon but the referee failed to call the foul and Park scored a lay-up immediately afterwards. The referee still did not blow the whistle even though Chun's face was visibly bloodied. Jung, incensed by the lack of action from the referee and other match officials, retaliated by elbowing Park in the face so hard that Park sustained several broken teeth and a fractured jaw and had to be stretchered off and immediately sent to the hospital for treatment. However, Jung was only whistled for a technical foul rather than a more serious flagrant foul, which would have warranted ejection.

His coaching career came to end when he was sent off for headbutting a referee during a match-up against traditional athletic rivals Korea University at the 2014 Asia-Pacific University Basketball Challenge. He had been livid with a referee's decision and headbutted the latter. After the referee attempted to send him off, he continued to protest and swore at the referee. Yonsei's administration immediately suspended him pending a full investigation by the Korean Basketball Association (KBA). After KBA voted to suspend his coaching license and ban him from basketball for five years, he admitted full responsibility for his actions and resigned from his post.

== Personal life ==
Jung married Hyun Eun-kyung in 1995. They have two sons, the younger of whom is also a professional basketball player and was drafted by Wonju DB Promy in the 2021 rookie draft.
