= Hongik University High School =

Coordinates: 37.59410°N 127.00326°E

Hongik University High School (홍익대학교 사범대학 부속고등학교, 弘益大學校師範大學附屬高等學校)
- Seongbuk-gu, Seoul; South Korea

Information
- Type: Private, Day
- Motto: 홍익인간 산학일체 弘益人間 産學一體
- Established: 1954
- Gender: Boys
- Enrollment: 300+
- Campus: urban
- Website: hongik.sen.hs.kr

Hongik University College of Education Affiliated High School (Korean: 홍익대학교 사범대학 부속고등학교), commonly known as Hongik University High School (홍대부고), is a high school for boys in Seongbuk District, Seoul, South Korea. It is part of a system of schools affiliated with Hongik University.

== History ==
The school was originally known as Seongbuk Middle and High School, educating students from ages 13 to 19. Its origins actually date to the Japanese colonial era and was then known as Gyeongseong Foreign Language Academy; the name Gyeongseong is the old name of Seoul. In 1969, in line with the "3+3" policy implemented by the government, the middle school and high school were split into separate schools. Both schools were incorporated into the Hongik Foundation (홍익학원) in 1970 and renamed accordingly to reflect its status as schools affiliated with Hongik University.

== Athletics ==
Hongik University High School is known for its fencing and basketball teams. Its student athletes have represented South Korea in international junior-level competitions.

The basketball program was founded in 1955. The team regularly made it to the semi-finals of national tournaments but was largely overshadowed by the likes of Whimoon, Kyungbock and Yongsan High Schools and did not win its first title until the 1990s.

The fencing program was founded in 1957, just a year after the Joseon Fencing Association had been reorganized into the present-day Korean Fencing Federation. It was the first high school in the country to have its own fencing team. Previously, fencing was only available through a community sports club or private coaching.

== Notable alumni ==
- Cho Sung-won, basketball coach and retired player
- Choi Byung-chul, retired foil fencer and 2012 Olympic silver medalist
- Kang Sang-jae, basketball player and 2017 KBL Rookie of the Year
- Kim Jung-hwan, sabre fencer and four-time Olympic medalist
- Lee Sang-min, retired basketball player and two-time KBL Most Valuable Player Award winner
- Lee Wook-jae, fencing coach
- Lim Dong-seob, basketball player
- Parc Jae-jung, singer
- Won Woo-young, retired sabre fencer and 2012 Olympic gold medalist
- Chan-Jin Chung, Professor at Lawrence Technological University, Founder of Robofest
