= Kang Sang-jae =

South Korean basketball player

No. 26 – Wonju DB Promy
- Position: Power forward
- League: Korean Basketball League

Personal information
- Born: December 31, 1994 (age 31) Daegu, South Korea
- Listed height: 6 ft 8 in (2.03 m)
- Listed weight: 232 lb (105 kg)

Career information
- High school: Hongik University High School
- College: Korea University
- KBL draft: 2016: 1st round, 3rd overall pick
- Playing career: 2016–present

Career history
- 2016–2021: Incheon Electroland Elephants
- 2020–2021: → Sangmu (loan)
- 2021–present: Wonju DB Promy

Career highlights
- KBL Rookie of the Year Award (2017); KBL rebounds leader – domestic players (2025); KBL Best 5 (2024)

- Kang Sang-jae
- Hangul: 강상재
- Hanja: 姜相才
- RR: Gang Sangjae
- MR: Kang Sangjae

Kang Sang-jae (born 31 December 1994) is a South Korean professional basketball player. He began his career with the Korean Basketball League side Incheon Electroland Elephants and is now playing for Wonju DB Promy. and the South Korea national team.

== Early years ==
A native of Daegu, Kang had been taller than most of his peers as a child and was thus drawn to basketball. He moved to Seoul for high school and attended Hongik University High School. With attention focused on Seoul's traditional powerhouses Yongsan and Kyungbock High Schools, he mostly flew under the radar until the fall 2012 championships, during which he led his high school to win the South Division title and was named tournament MVP.

== Career ==
=== College ===
Kang played college basketball for Korea University and was teammates with Lee Jong-hyun. He was mostly a substitute player during his freshman year but established himself by his junior year, especially during the Professional-Amateur series, in which collegiate teams play against KBL professional and reserve teams. He and Lee, dubbed the "Twin Towers" because of their height, led Korea University to a surprise win over a Sangmu team composed of experienced KBL players fulfilling their mandatory military service. During his senior year, Korea University were overshadowed by a dominant Yonsei University team captained by Choi Jun-yong in the collegiate league and competitions but Kang impressed enough to earn a call up to the national team.

=== Professional ===
Kang, along with Lee and Choi, was considered one of the "big 3" of the 2016 KBL rookie draft. He was drafted third overall by Incheon Electroland Elephants. In his first season, he averaged 8.20 points, 4.58 rebounds and 0.96 assists as Incheon reached the semi-finals of the playoffs. He won the KBL Rookie of the Year Award. In the 2017–18 season, he averaged 9.63 points, 5.24 rebounds and 1.19 assists. In his 3rd season there, he averaged 11.62 points 5.64 rebounds and 1.39 assists.

Kang enlisted for mandatory military service in June 2020 and was assigned to the Sangmu team after completing basic training. His contract ended following the 2020-21 season and he became a free agent. Wonju DB Promy signed him and veteran Park Chan-hee in a trade-off with Doo Kyung-min and announced that Kang would be added to the team roster immediately after his discharge. He was officially discharged on December 1, returning to the team for the remainder of the 2021-22 season.

The next two seasons were largely forgetful as Kang struggled with inconsistent form and injuries. He was named captain by newly-appointed head coach Kim Joo-sung for the upcoming 2023-24 season. During the regular season, he averaged 14 points, 6.3 rebounds and 4.3 assists and played a vital role in DB qualifying for the playoffs for the first time since the 2017-18 season (excluding the 2019-20 during which the playoffs were canceled due to the COVID-19 pandemic). He was named in the KBL Best 5 for the first time in his career and finished runner-up in the voting for the KBL Most Valuable Player Award, which ultimately went to his DB teammate Ethan Alvano. However, he was unable to replicate his form during the playoffs. DB finished first in the regular season standings but were knocked by eventual Championship winners Busan KCC Egis in the playoff semifinals.

Kang became a free agent at the end of the 2023-24 season and re-signed with DB for another five-years. His new contract made him the highest-paid domestic player on the team. DB failed to qualify for the playoffs, finishing seventh in the regular league. Kang posted his worst ever statistic in points per game, averaging only 8.1 points in 40 games. He set a KBL record for the most number of rebounds in a single game by a player without scoring a single point, recording 22 rebounds during the win against Seoul SK Knights in March. It is also the third highest number by a domestic player in a league game.

=== National team career ===
==== Junior teams ====
Kang participated in the 2013 FIBA Under-19 World Championship, where he averaged 18.8 points, 2.2 rebounds and 1 assists

==== Senior team ====
Kang was named into the squad for the 2019 FIBA Basketball World Cup where he averaged 2.6 points, 1.6 rebounds and 0 assist at the tournament. He was called up to the national team several times while in the military to fill in for injured players.

== Personal life ==
Kang married his girlfriend in May 2020, weeks before his enlistment. They have two daughters.
