= Lim Dong-seob =

South Korean basketball player

No. 13 – Changwon LG Sakers
- Position: Forward
- League: KBL

Personal information
- Born: August 29, 1990 (age 36) Seoul, South Korea
- Listed height: 6 ft 6 in (1.98 m)

Career information
- College: Chung-Ang University
- Playing career: 2012–present

Career history
- 2012–2023: Seoul Samsung Thunders
- 2017–2019: → Sangmu (loan)
- 2023–present: Changwon LG Sakers

- Lim Dong-seob
- Hangul: 임동섭
- RR: Im Dongseop
- MR: Im Tongsŏp

Lim Dong-seob (born August 29, 1990) is a South Korean basketball player former team Seoul Samsung Thunders and present Changwon LG Sakers and the South Korean national team.

== Early life ==
Lim began playing basketball in elementary school but was a guard as he was one of the shortest members in the team. He went on to Hongik University High School. By then he had a growth spurt and converted into a forward, his current position.

== Career ==
=== College ===
Lim played college basketball for Chung-Ang University and was contemporaries with future national teammate Lee Dae-sung. Although Chung-Ang was largely overshadowed by the duopoly of Yonsei University and Korea University in collegiate competitions, he quickly gained the attention of KBL and national team scouts during his senior year, especially after scoring 36 points and 12 rebounds against powerhouses Yonsei.

=== Professional ===
Lim was the second overall pick of the 2012 KBL rookie draft. He was drafted by Seoul Samsung Thunders and was widely expected to be the successor to veteran teammate Lee Kyu-sup in the forward position due to their tall height and shooting skills. While he was mostly the sixth man, he played in nearly all league games during his rookie season.

In January 2014, Lim injured his left foot in a league game against Jeonju KCC Egis and missed the rest of the 2014–15 season. Without a similar player to fill his void and injuries plaguing other key players, the Thunders finished the season with its lowest win rate on record (11 wins and 43 losses). Due to his background playing in the guard position, he played as a shooting guard during the 2015–16 season.

In May 2017, Lim enlisted for mandatory military service and was assigned to the Sangmu team after completing basic training. He was discharged in January 2019.

=== National team ===
Lim made the squads for both the 2017 William Jones Cup and the Asia Cup. His shooting prowess came to the fore in the loss to hosts Lebanon as he was responsible for half the team's successful three-pointers in the game.

Lim was called up for the 2019 William Jones Cup and the World Cup qualifiers. However, he was excluded from the final 12-man squad for the 2019 FIBA Basketball World Cup as Yang Hee-jong and Choi Jun-yong were preferred in the forward position.
