= 2016 Korean Basketball League draft =

2016 KBL draft

General information
- Sport: Basketball
- Date: October 18, 2016
- Location: Jamsil Students' Gymnasium
- Network: MBC Sports+

Overview
- League: KBL
- First selection: Lee Jong-hyun (Ulsan Mobis Phoebus)

The 2016 Korean Basketball League rookie draft (Korean: 2015 KBL 국내신인선수 드래프트) was held on October 18, 2016, at the Jamsil Students' Gymnasium in Seoul, South Korea. Of the 38 candidates, 26 were drafted, making this draft one of the few years with such a high draft rate. It was also one of the rare drafts which continued until the fourth round.

== Draft selections ==
This table only shows the first twenty picks.

G	Guard
F	Forward
C	Center

Denotes players who have won a KBL-sanctioned award at its annual awards ceremony (Note: One or more of the following awards: Regular season MVP; Playoffs MVP; Rookie of the Year; Best 5; Defensive Player of the Year; Defensive Best 5; Sixth Man Award; Most Improved Player; Fair Play Award)

Round	Pick	Player	Position	Team	School/club team
1	1	Lee Jong-hyun	C	Ulsan Mobis Phoebus	Korea University (senior)
1	2	Choi Jun-yong	F	Seoul SK Knights	Yonsei University (senior)
1	3	Kang Sang-jae	F	Incheon Electroland Elephants	Korea University (senior)
1	4	Cheon Ki-bum	G	Seoul Samsung Thunders	Yonsei University (senior)
1	5	Park In-tae	C	Changwon LG Sakers	Yonsei University (junior)
1	6	Park Ji-hoon	G	Busan KT Sonicboom	Chung-Ang University (junior)
1	7	Choi Seong-mo	G	Wonju Dongbu Promy	Korea University (senior)
1	8	Kim Chul-wook	C	Anyang KGC	Kyung Hee University (senior)
1	9	Han Jun-young (Note: Legally changed his name to Park Se-jin (박세진) in 2017)	C	Jeonju KCC Egis	Hanyang University (senior)
1	10	Kim Jin-yoo	G	Goyang Orion Orions	Konkuk University (senior)
2	11	Jung Moon-ho	F	Goyang Orion Orions	Konkuk University (senior)
2	12	Choi Seung-wook	F	Jeonju KCC Egis	Kyung Hee University (senior)
2	13	Park Jae-han	G	Anyang KGC	Chung-Ang University (senior)
2	14	Maeng Sang-hoon	G	Wonju Dongbu Promy	Kyung Hee University (senior)
2	15	Jung Hee-won	F	Busan KT Sonicboom	Korea University (senior)
2	16	Park In-duk	F	Changwon LG Sakers	Chung-Ang University (senior)
2	17	Sung Ki-bin	G	Seoul Samsung Thunders	Yonsei University (senior)
2	18	Lee Heon	F	Incheon Electroland Elephants	Sungkyunkwan University (senior)
2	19	Kim Jun-seong	G	Seoul SK Knights	Myongji University (senior)
2	20	Oh Jong-kyun	G	Ulsan Mobis Phoebus	(Japan) Tokyo Fuji University

== See also ==
- Korean Basketball League draft
