= 2015 Korean Basketball League draft =

2015 KBL draft

General information
- Sport: Basketball
- Date: October 26, 2015
- Location: Jamsil Students' Gymnasium
- Network: MBC Sports+

Overview
- League: KBL
- First selection: Moon Seong-gon (Anyang KGC)

The 2015 Korean Basketball League rookie draft (Korean: 2015 KBL 국내신인선수 드래프트) was held on October 26, 2017, at the Jamsil Students' Gymnasium in Seoul, South Korea. Out of the 34 participants, 22 players were drafted.

In September, the KBL released the list of participants. On October 26, the draft day itself, a try-out was held in the morning and the picks took place in the evening. Goyang Orion Orions traded its highest-drawn first round pick to Changwon LG Sakers in exchange for Moon Tae-jong, hence LG being able to obtain two first round picks.

== Draft selections ==
This table only shows the first twenty picks.

G	Guard
F	Forward
C	Center

Denotes players who have won a KBL-sanctioned award at its annual awards ceremony (Note: One or more of the following awards: Regular season MVP; Playoffs MVP; Rookie of the Year; Best 5; Defensive Player of the Year; Defensive Best 5; Sixth Man Award; Most Improved Player; Fair Play Award)

Round	Pick	Player	Position	Team	School/club team
1	1	Moon Seong-gon	F	Anyang KGC	Korea University (senior)
1	2	Han Hui-won	F	Incheon Electroland Elephants	Kyung Hee University (senior)
1	3	Song Kyo-chang	F	Jeonju KCC Egis	Samil Commercial High School
1	4	Choi Chang-jin	G	Busan KT Sonicboom	Kyung Hee University (senior)
1	5	Lee Dong-yeop	G	Seoul Samsung Thunders	Korea University (junior)
1	6	Jung Sung-woo	G	Changwon LG Sakers	Sangmyung University (senior)
1	7	Lee Dae-heon	C	Seoul SK Knights	Dongguk University (senior)
1	8	Han Sang-hyuk	G	Changwon LG Sakers	Hanyang University (senior)
1	9	Seo Min-soo	F	Wonju Dongbu Promy	Dongguk University (senior)
1	10	Jung Sung-ho	F	Ulsan Mobis Phoebus	Yonsei University (senior)
2	11	Ryu Young-hwan	F	Ulsan Mobis Phoebus	Konkuk University (senior)
2	12	Kim Dong-hee	F	Wonju Dongbu Promy	Chosun University (senior)
2	13	Sung Geon-joo	G	Goyang Orion Orions	Kyung Hee University (senior)
2	14	Lee Seung-hwan	G	Seoul SK Knights	Konkuk University (senior)
2	15	Lee Ho-young	C	Goyang Orion Orions	Korea University
2	16	Lee Jong-gu	G	Seoul Samsung Thunders	Kyung Hee University (junior)
2	17	Ryu Ji-seok	C	Busan KT Sonicboom	Sangmyung University (junior)
2	18	Park Jun-woo	F	Jeonju KCC Egis	Chosun University
2	19	Incheon Electroland Elephants forfeited			
2	20	Anyang KGC forfeited			

== Players ==
Future MVP Song Kyo-chang was the only high school senior picked in the draft. The third overall pick, he was the first high school senior to be picked so early in the history of the KBL draft since Korean-American Han Sang-woong (Richard Han) in 2005.

== See also ==
- Korean Basketball League draft
