= Yang Hong-seok =

Yang Hong-seok may refer to:

- Yang Hong-seok or Hongseok, member of South Korean boy group Pentagon
- Yang Hong-seok (basketball)
