= Kim Yoo-taek =

South Korean basketball player

Personal information
- Born: 10 October 1963 (age 63) South Korea
- Listed height: 197 cm (6 ft 6 in)

Career information
- College: Chung-Ang University
- Playing career: 1987–2000
- Position: Center
- Coaching career: 2002–2014

Career history

Playing
- 1987–2000: Kia Motors / Busan Kia Enterprise

Coaching
- 2002–2005: Myongji High School basketball team (head coach)
- 2008–2009: South Korea men's national team (assistant coach)
- 2009–2011: Daegu Orions (assistant coach)
- 2011–2015: Chung-Ang University basketball team (head coach)

Career highlights
- KBL Championship (1997); KBL Sixth Man Award (1997); Ulsan Hyundai Mobis Phoebus number 14 retired

- Kim Yoo-taek
- Hangul: 김유택
- Hanja: 金裕宅
- RR: Gim Yutaek
- MR: Kim Yut'aek

Kim Yoo-taek (born October 10, 1963 in Pocheon, Gyeonggi Province, South Korea) is a former South Korean basketball player. Although positioned as a center due to his height, Kim possessed the ball-handling skills of a guard and was equally capable of playing inside and outside. He is considered one of the greatest Asian centers to ever play the game, along with Carlos Loyzaga and Yao Ming.

== Early life ==
Kim began playing basketball because his high school team lacked tall players and recruited him. He played for Myongji High School, whose basketball team was still relatively new.

== Career ==
Kim attended Chung-Ang University alongside Han Ki-bum and Hur Jae. He, Hur and Kang Dong-hee, dubbed the "Hur-Dong-Taek Trio", formed the offensive core of the Chung-Ang University team which dominated college basketball during the 1980's. He joined the Busan-based amateur team of Kia Motors, the predecessor of Ulsan Hyundai Mobis Phoebus. Hur and Kang later joined him and the "Hur-Dong-Taek Trio" led Busan Kia to dominate the pre-KBL era competition. In 1996, he reached 4,000 career points. With the founding of the professional league (Korean Basketball League) in 1997, Kim stayed on with the team and retired in 2000. He was the oldest professional player at that time. After retirements of Hur and Kang, the media dubbed it the "end of an era".

Busan Kia Enterprise retired his number 14 jersey in 2000, a legacy carried on by its successor team Ulsan Hyundai Mobis Phoebus. He was nicknamed "Stork" (황새) due to his gangly stature and the fact that his ability on the court belied his meticulous and strict appearance.

== Post-retirement career ==
In 2002, Kim was appointed head coach of the basketball team at his alma mater Myongji High School. During his first season in charge, he led them to success at the spring championships.

He worked as a commentator for SPOTV.

== Personal life ==
Kim has two sons who are professional basketball players. He and his first wife divorced and she was granted primary custody of their son Jin-soo, who later adopted his stepfather's surname Choi as an adult.
