= Kim Min-gyu (baseball) =

South Korean baseball player (born 1999)

Doosan Bears – No. 19
- Pitcher
- Born: May 7, 1999 (age 27); Seoul, South Korea
- Bats: Left Throws: Right

KBO League debut
- May 9, 2018, for the Doosan Bears

KBO statistics (through May 22, 2024)
- Win–loss record: 3–5
- Earned run average: 5.36
- Strikeouts: 103

Teams
- Doosan Bears (2018–2021, 2023–present)

Kim Min-gyu (Korean: 김민규; born May 7, 1999) is a South Korean professional baseball pitcher who is currently playing for the Doosan Bears of KBO League. He graduated from Whimoon High School (휘문고등학교; 徽文高等學校) and was selected to Doosan Bears by a draft in 2018 (2nd draft, 3rd round).
