= Park Seung-cheol =

South Korean physician

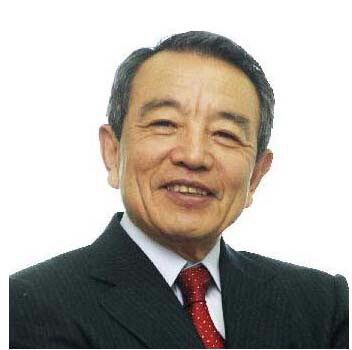
- Born: 5 January 1940; Beijing, China
- Died: 1 June 2014 (aged 74); Seoul, South Korea
- Education: Kyungbock High School; Seoul National University
- Occupation: Physician

Korean name
- Hangul: 박승철
- Hanja: 朴陞哲
- RR: Bak Seungcheol
- MR: Pak Sŭngch'ŏl

Park Seung-cheol (5 January 1940 – 1 June 2014) was a South Korean physician and specialist in infectious diseases.

== Early life ==
Park was the first son of Korean independence activist and Provisional Government of the Republic of Korea official Park Myeong-ryeol, who lived in exile in China during Japanese colonial rule. After World War II, the family returned to Korea, where the young Park was raised. When the Korean War broke out, he fled with his family to his father's hometown of Gwangcheon-eup, in Hongseong-gun, Chungcheongnam-do near the city of Gongju. He attended Gwangcheon Elementary School before returning to Seoul, where he studied at Kyungbock High School. He graduated from Seoul National University's Department of Medicine in 1965 and went on to earn Masters and Ph.D. degrees in internal medicine from the same university.

== Career ==
Park became an associate professor at Hanyang University, before moving to Korea University. During the 2002–2004 severe acute respiratory syndrome (SARS) outbreak he served as chairman of the South Korean government's SARS Response Advisory Committee. In 2003 he was awarded the Order of Service Merit by President Roh Moo-hyun for his role in fighting SARS. From 2004 to 2006 he was the CEO of the Central Veterans' Hospital (중앙보훈병원) in Seoul. In 2006 he became the founding director of the Korean Society for Zoonoses, and an emeritus fellow of the Korean Academy of Science and Technology. In 2008 he began working as a consultant to the Samsung Medical Center. During the 2009 flu pandemic, he also served as chairman of the South Korean government's New Flu Advisory Committee.

== Death ==
He died on the morning of 1 June 2014 at the Samsung Seoul Hospital.
