= Hur Jae =

South Korean basketball player and coach

Heo Jae
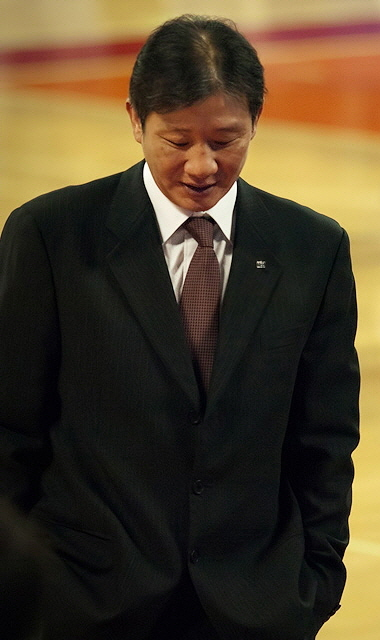
- Born: September 28, 1965 (age 61); Chuncheon, Gangwon Province, South Korea
- Occupations: Retired basketball player and coach; television personality
- Years active: 1987–present
- Spouse: Lee Mi-soo (m. 1992)
- Children: Heo Ung; Heo Hoon
- Basketball career

Personal information
- Listed height: 6 ft 2 in (1.88 m)
- Listed weight: 176 lb (80 kg)

Career information
- High school: Yongsan High School (Seoul, South Korea)
- College: Chung-Ang University
- Playing career: 1987–2004
- Position: Shooting guard
- Number: 9
- Coaching career: 2005–2018

Career history

Playing
- 1987–1998: Busan Kia Enterprise
- 1998–2004: Wonju Naray Blue Bird / Wonju Sambo Xers / Wonju TG Xers / Wonju TG Sambo Xers

Coaching
- 2005–2015: Jeonju KCC Egis (head coach)
- 2016–2018: South Korea national team (head coach)

Career highlights
- As player: 2× KBL Championship (1997, 2003); KBL regular season champion (2004); KBL Playoffs MVP (1998); KBL Best 5 (2000); KBL 20th Anniversary All-Time Legend 12; Wonju DB Promy No. 9 retired; As coach: 2× KBL Championship (2009, 2011)
Medals
Men's basketball
Representing South Korea
Asian Games
Silver medal – second place	1986 Seoul	Team
Bronze medal – third place	1990 Beijing	Team
Silver medal – second place	1994 Hiroshima	Team
FIBA Asia Cup (formerly Asian Basketball Confederation Championship)
Silver medal – second place	1985 Kuala Lumpur	Team
Silver medal – second place	1987 Bangkok	Team
Silver medal – second place	1989 Beijing	Team
Silver medal – second place	1991 Kobe	Team
Silver medal – second place	1995 Seoul	Team
Silver medal – second place	1999 Fukuoka	Team
East Asian Games
Silver medal – second place	1993 Shanghai	Team
FIBA Asia Under-18 Championship (formerly Asian Basketball Confederation Under-18 Championship)
Gold medal – first place	1984 Seoul	U-19; Team

- Korean name
- Hangul: 허재
- Hanja: 許載
- RR: Heo Jae
- MR: Hŏ Chae

Hur Jae (Korean: 허재; born September 28, 1965) is a South Korean retired basketball coach and former player. His playing and coaching career combined spanned over three decades, beginning during the semi-professional era and coinciding with the establishment of the professional Korean Basketball League (KBL). As one of the most recognizable domestic sports stars of the late 1980s to early 2000s, Hur was nicknamed "The President of Korean Basketball" (농구대통령) by Korean fans and the media. At the 1988 Summer Olympics in Seoul, he took the Athlete's Oath with handball player Son Mi-na.

Hur is widely regarded as the greatest South Korean basketball player of all time, with his prime in the early to mid 1990s. Although his predominant position was at shooting guard, due to his ability to shoot from both inside and outside the paint, he possessed the aggressiveness and physicality to play under the post and the ball handling and passing skills typical of point guards, leading to him being described as the most all-rounded and versatile players in the history of domestic basketball. He is the father of basketball players Heo Ung and Heo Hoon.

== Early life and education ==
Hur is the youngest of four children and has an older brother and two older sisters. Their father, who died in 2010, was a refugee from Sinuiju in present-day North Pyongan Province, North Korea. He graduated from Sangmyung Primary School in 1978, Yongsan Middle School in 1981 and Yongsan High School in 1984. A highly rated prospect in high school, he was notably the center of a fierce recruiting "war" between Korea University and Chung-Ang University. He ultimately chose Chung-Ang and graduated in 1988.

== Playing career ==
=== College days ===
Hur, Kim Yoo-taek and Kang Dong-hee, dubbed the "Hur-Dong-Taek Trio", formed the core of the Chung-Ang University team which dominated college basketball during the 1980s and still regarded as one of the most legendary group of players in Chung-Ang history. Along with center Han Ki-bum, the quartet were credited with breaking the duopoly of Yonsei University and Korea University in college basketball and raising the profile of Chung-Ang's basketball team, especially since the university was better known for producing actors and actresses at that time.

=== Busan Kia Enterprise (1987–1998) ===
In 1988, Hur joined Han and Kim at the Busan-based amateur basketball team of Kia Motors, which became Ulsan Hyundai Mobis Phoebus after its parent company bought over Kia. At that time, Kia recruited a large number of Chung-Ang University players, including future Wonju Dongbu Promy coach Kim Young-man, into its team and dominated the main amateur-era competition, the National Basketball Festival (농구대잔치). Kang later joined them and the reunited "Hur-Dong-Taek Trio" played a major role in Kia's continued domination of the National Basketball Festival competition. Hur led the team to win the competition for five years straight (1988–1993) and for another back to back in (1995–1996), and he won the Most Valuable Player (MVP) three times.

On March 3, 1991, Hur was involved in an infamous brawl during a championship match against Hyundai, the amateur-era predecessor of Jeonju KCC Egis. Early in the first half, he was elbowed by Hyundai's Im Dal-sik. Hur furiously approached Im, pushing him in the head, and Im responded by hitting Hur with a right hand. After both players were ejected, Hur confronted Im again, and Im's teammate, Kim Sung-wook connected with an uppercut to Hur's jaw. Hur suffered a fractured jaw which took 3 months to heal. Both Hur and Im were suspended for 6 months and Kim was suspended for 3 months following the incident. Hur and Im, who later became a coach, have since reconciled.

The Kia team registered as one of the founding teams of the newly established professional league, the Korean Basketball League. They won the first ever KBL Championship. However, Kia's corporate sponsor was going through financial difficulties due to the 1997 Asian financial crisis, which had severely impacted South Korea. The unstable finances also meant that Kia had difficulty recruiting younger players to replace aging and outgoing key players. The aging team found themselves struggling to keep up with a younger Hyundai team led by Lee Sang-min, Cho Sung-won and Choo Seung-gyun. Kia managed to reach the 1997–98 play-off finals but lost to Hyundai in a close race. Hur was named play-off MVP, the only time the award went to a member of the losing team.

By then, relations with his head coach had deteriorated and Hur was accused of disrupting the team atmosphere, especially after he was charged with drunk driving. He declared that at the end of the 1997–98 season that he would leave Kia regardless of the season's results.

=== Wonju (1998–2004) ===
After a decade with Busan Kia Enterprise, Hur was traded to Wonju Naray Blue Bird, now Wonju DB Promy. He formed a tandem together with guard Shin Ki-sung, who had just been drafted that year. With the drafting of center-forward Kim Joo-sung, the newly renamed Wonju TG Xers became a formidable team and were dubbed "Speed TG" due to a combination of Kim's rebounding and scoring prowess, Shin's speed and shooting accuracy, Hur's experience and versatility and foreign recruit Leon Derricks' physical strength. During the 2002–03 regular season, Hur's playing time was reduced but he played a vital role by boosting team morale and contributing decisive points during the playoffs, especially in TG's hard-fought victory over defending champions Daegu Orions in the final; TG went on to win 4 out of the six games.

Hur retired at the end of the 2003–04 season. TG Xers retired his number 9 jersey, a legacy inherited by its current successor team Wonju DB Promy. The KBL honored him with a "retirement game", which was sold-out within minutes, for the first time in its history and it featured his former teammates including Kang Dong-hee, Lee Sang-min and Hyun Joo-yup.

=== National team ===
Hur competed in two Summer Olympics, earning his best finish of ninth in men's team event at Seoul in 1988. In 1990, Hur set the record for most points in a FIBA World Championship match, a record that still stands to this day, scoring 54 against Egypt in a 117–115 victory for 15th place. He also participated in the 1995 ABC Championship hosted on home soil and was named MVP despite losing to China in the final.

== Coaching career ==
Hur expressed his interest in coaching after retiring and was sent to the United States. He was on the coaching staff of the Pepperdine University men's basketball team.

=== Jeonju KCC Egis ===
In 2005, Hur returned to South Korea to become the head coach of KBL team Jeonju KCC Egis. He broke the stereotype of star athletes failing as head coaches by leading the team to two KBL Championship titles, becoming the first former player-turned-coach to have won the Championship as a player and a head coach. During his tenure, he gained a reputation for his astute draft picks and signings such as three-time Defensive Best 5 selectee and "one-club man" Shin Myung-ho, 2013 FIBA Asia Championship All-Tournament selection Kim Ming-goo, six-time domestic rebounding leader center Ha Seung-jin and star point guard Kim Tae-sul.

During the 2013–14 season, in the October 15 game against Ulsan Mobis Phoebus, he went viral for his mispronunciation of the phrase "Is this blocking?" when one of his players had an attempt thwarted by the opponent and referee Hong Ki-hwan had called a block instead of a foul. Hur had been livid with Hong's decision as he felt that his player had been fouled and protested to Hong, although to no avail. The Korean transliteration of "block" is 블락 (beul-lak) and Hur had mispronounced it as 불낙 (bul-nak); the term itself is a portmanteau of 불 from "bulgogi" and 낙 from "octopus" (낙지, nakji) and refers to bulgogi octopus stew. This led to octopus stew-related internet memes circulating and the phrase was parodied by comedians and other athletes, including Hur's own sons, as a term to express extreme discontent over another person's decision. The meme would resurface in 2015 after older son Heo Ung recorded the first block of his career and the clip of Heo Ung's block itself went viral along with the caption "This is a block."

Preparations for the 2014–15 season were interrupted when star rookie Kim Min-goo was seriously injured in a car accident caused by drunk driving. At the 2014 rookie draft, Hur came under intense media scrutiny when his older son, a shooting guard and junior at Yonsei University, declared eligibility early and entered the draft. Pundits speculated whether he would be picking his son to replace Kim as they played in similar positions. In the end, Hur picked Korea University guard Kim Ji-hoo and his son was picked next by Wonju DB Promy. Hur had envisioned a "dream team" helmed by Ha Seung-jin, Kim Min-goo and Kim Tae-sul, who was signed via a two-player trade, but it never materialized due to Kim Min-goo's accident, Kim Tae-sul's slump in form and Ha Seung-jin's frequent injuries.

In February 2015, Hur announced his resignation after the last game of the fifth round, citing the team's poor results and stress affecting his physical health as the reasons. His assistant coach Choo Seung-gyun was named acting coach for the remainder of the season. Jeonju KCC Egis was ranked 9th at that time.

Hur had steered the team to two Championship titles and six appearances in the playoffs during his ten seasons, accruing 252 wins in 531 games (0.475 win rate) as head coach. Although having a win rate slightly lower than 50%, he has been retrospectively evaluated as one of domestic sport's more successful star players-turned-coaches in terms of silverware, especially in light of his younger counterparts such as Lee Sang-min and Hyun Joo-yup, becoming head coaches of KBL teams but to little success. At the time of his resignation, he was one of only seven KBL-registered head coaches to have recorded 200 or more wins during the regular season and also won a Championship.

Popular during his playing days, Hur was a polarizing figure as a head coach. He was known for his fiery temperament and propensity for arguing with referees and match officials, resulting in him being fined a number of times for unsporting behavior. During his time at Jeonju KCC Egis, he coached some of the biggest names in domestic basketball such as Choo Seung-gyun, Ha Seung-jin, Kim Tae-sul, Lee Sang-min and Seo Jang-hoon and was popular with his players for his charisma and more liberal management style, a departure from the strict hierarchical culture of the era in which players had little say in team decisions.

=== South Korean national team ===
In 2009 and 2011, Hur had brief stints as head coach of the South Korean national team, an appointment he held concurrently with his position at Jeonju KCC Egis. In June 2016, he was named full-time head coach of the national team. Under him, the national team finished third at the 2017 FIBA Asia Cup and won bronze at the 2018 Asian Games. He resigned after the Asian Games and was succeeded by his assistant Kim Sang-shik.

== Post-coaching activities ==
After he resigned as the head coach of the national team, Hur started to appear on entertainment shows. He has dismissed returning to the KBL in a coaching position.

Alongside his former national teammates Seo Jang-hoon and Hyun Joo-yup, Hur was among the earliest retired basketball stars to regularly star on entertainment programs. The trio were active during the late 1990s when basketball rivaled football as the country's most popular sport. Their appearances have been credited with drawing more positive attention to the KBL, especially since the league and its players and coaches had been in the negative spotlight after a series of scandals involving illegal betting, match-fixing and drunk driving from the late 2000s to early 2010's. In June 2022, he and his sons were featured in their own 8-episode reality show Impossible Time (허섬세월) where they spend ten days living on Nokdo, a sparsely-inhabited island only accessible by ferry from the port city of Boryeong.

In May 2022, Hur was appointed chief executive of Dayone Asset Management, the new owners of Goyang Carrot Jumpers, leading him to withdraw from the MBC show Household Mate. Dayone reiterated that he would continue appearing on entertainment programs.

== Personal life ==
In 1992, Hur married sculptor Lee Mi-soo after meeting her during an off-season trip to Busan. They have two sons, Heo Ung and Heo Hoon, both of whom are professional basketball players. Hur has stated that both sons never formally learned to play basketball from him since he and his wife had been adamantly opposed to them becoming professional athletes. To prevent them from being overshadowed by him, he rarely attended their games or appeared on television programs with them until they had established themselves in the KBL.

When Heo Hoon won the KBL Most Valuable Player Award, he created the first father-son duo to receive this honor in South Korean basketball; Hur Jae had won the 1997–98 Playoffs MVP and the equivalent MVP award during the amateur era.

== Filmography ==
=== TV shows ===
Year	Title	Network	Note	Ref.
1994	The Last Match	MBC	Episode 12, Special appearance as a basketball player	
2000	Three Friends	MBC	Episode 3, Special appearance as himself	
2019	Law of the Jungle	SBS	Sunda Islands Episode 383 – 387, Cast Member	
2019 – 2020	Naturally	MBN	Episode 13 – 43, Cast Member	
2020	Don't Be Jealous	MBC	Episode 1 – 17, Main Host	
2020	Law of the Jungle	SBS	Wild Korea Episode 416 – 419, Cast Member	
2020	18 Again	JTBC	Episode 8, Special appearance as a coach at 2009 KBU Draft	
2019 – 2021	Let’s Play Soccer	JTBC	Cast Member	
2019	Men on a Mission	JTBC	Men on a Mission (Episode 219, Guest)	
2021	Law of the Jungle	SBS	Stove League (Episode 434 – 437, Cast Member)	
2021	Let's Play Basketball	JTBC	Cast Member	
2021–2022	Liberation Town	JTBC	Cast Member (Episode 1–34)	
2021	Boss in the Mirror	KBS	Guest, Episode 89, 96, 97, 98, 99, 102, 118, 119	
2021	My Hometown	KBS2	Host	
2021	Family Register Mate	MBC	panelist / Chuseok holiday specials	
2021	Godfather	KBS2	Main Cast	
2021	Golf King Season 2	TV Chosun	Cast Member	
2022	Modern Heojae	KBS2	Host / Lunar New Year Holiday Special Items	
2022–present	Boss in the Mirror	KBS2	Host	
2022	Family Register Mate	MBC	Panelist	
2022	Impossible Time	JTBC	Cast Member	
2022	Hole-in-one between legends	MBC Every1	Cast Member	
2022	Sports Golden Bell	KBS2	contestant; Chuseok Special	

=== Web shows ===
Year	Title	Role	Notes	Ref.
2021–2022	Modern Heojae	Host	YouTube KBS Channel	

== Ambassadorship ==
- Public Relations Ambassador for the Fruit of Love Community Chest (2021)

== Awards and nominations ==
Name of the award ceremony, year presented, category, nominee of the award, and the result of the nomination
Award ceremony	Year	Category	Nominee / Work	Result	Ref.
KBS Entertainment Awards	2020	Rookie Award in Reality Category	Boss in the Mirror	Nominated	
KBS Entertainment Awards	2021	Top Excellence Award in Reality Category	Godfather, Boss in the Mirror	Won	
KBS Entertainment Awards	2022	Top Excellence Award in Reality Category	Boss in the Mirror	Nominated	
KBS Entertainment Awards	2022	Producer Special Award	Boss in the Mirror	Won	
