= Yongsan High School =

Boarding school in Seoul, South Korea

Coordinates: 37.5456°N 126.9798°E

Yongsan High School (용산고등학교, 龍山高等學校)
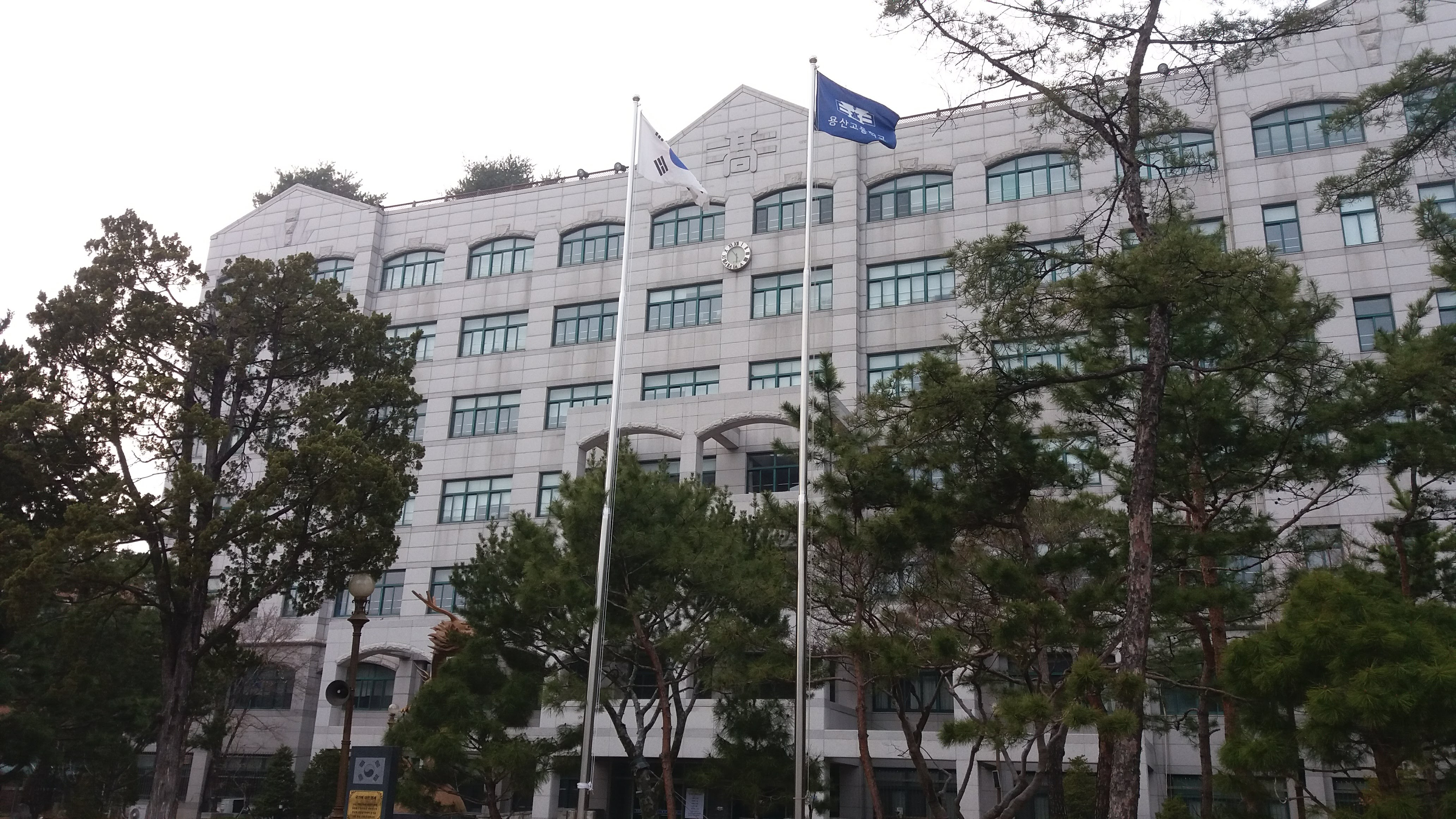
- Yongsan, Seoul; South Korea

Information
- Type: Public, Day & boarding
- Motto: 至誠 (Hangul: 지성; English: Diligence)
- Established: 1946
- Gender: Boys
- Enrollment: 900+
- Campus: urban
- Color: Blue
- Website: yongsan.sen.hs.kr

Yongsan High School (Korean: 용산고등학교) is a public high school in Yongsan, Seoul, South Korea for boys in grades 10 to 12 (ages 16 to 19). It is one of the few public schools in Seoul with boarding facilities.

== History ==
The origins of Yongsan High School date back to the Japanese colonial era, but the school only officially recognizes 1946 as the foundation since that school exclusively educated the children of Japanese military officials. As with many Seoul-based education institutions, the school was forced to evacuate to Busan in 1951 and remained there for the duration of the Korean War. In September 1953 the school returned to Seoul and briefly shared buildings with the U.S. military forces while the nearby existing base was being renovated. The school continues to occupy the same plot of land but has expanded and added new buildings over the years. The current main building was completed in 1999, and a new dormitory was built in 2011 to accommodate boarders.

== Academics ==
Yongsan High School is classified as a "general high school" (일반계 고등학교) with a science and mathematics-focused program, which differs from the more selective and specialized "science high schools" (과학영재학교) such as Seoul Science High School. In addition to its mandated intake of boys residing within the vicinity and from designated feeder middle schools, it also accepts academically-gifted students from around Seoul who qualify for the program.

== Athletics ==
Yongsan High School is known for its sports teams, especially in field hockey and basketball. Its student athletes are regularly called up to the youth national teams in both sports.

The field hockey team is considered a powerhouse in high school hockey. More recently, they were back-to-back Presidential National Hockey Tournament champions (2019 and 2020) and reached the final for the third consecutive time in 2021.

It was one of the earliest high schools to introduce basketball and has continuously produced players who have gone on to play professionally in the Korean Basketball League and the South Korean national team. During the 1960s to 1980s, it gained a reputation as one of the city's top schools for high school basketball, along with Whimoon and Kyungbock, the latter of which is still considered Yongsan's biggest rival to this day. As of 2021, Yongsan High School has produced three overall number 1 draft picks in the annual Korean Basketball League rookie draft, the second most of any high school in the country.

== Notable alumni ==
- Chung Mong-gyu, businessman and chairman of HDC Group
- Heo Hoon, basketball player
- Heo Ung, basketball player
- Hur Jae, retired basketball player and former national team coach
- Jung Hee-sung, poet
- Kang Il-won, judge of the Constitutional Court of Korea
- Kim Yong-gun, actor
- Lee Jung-suk, basketball player
- Lee Seoung-hyun, basketball player
- Nam Hyun-woo, field hockey player
- Park Joong-hoon, actor
- Yang Dong-geun, retired basketball player
- Yeo Jun-seok, college basketball player for Seattle Redhawks

== In popular culture ==
The term "Yongsan mafia" has been used by the media to refer to "old boy" connections in domestic basketball, even if the aforementioned names were never contemporaries or actually knew one another from their school days. Around 2005, the downfall of the company Sambo Computer, the parent company of TG Sambo which owned the Wonju-based basketball team (now Wonju DB Promy), led investigative journalists to discover that the company founder's son and a large number of the team's administration, players and coaching staff were Yongsan High School alumni. The term was again used during the 2007-08 season as the managers of the top four teams in the league were all alumni of Yongsan High School. When Ulsan Mobis Phoebus defeated Jeonju KCC Egis in the play-off finals to win the 2010 KBL Championship, The Chosun Ilbo referred to the victory as "Kyungbock family defeats Yongsan mafia"; Ulsan Mobis Phoebus manager Yoo Jae-hak and captain Woo Ji-won and then Hyundai Mobis vice president Hwang Yeol-heon were Kyungbock graduates while Jeonju KCC Egis manager Hur Jae, several KCC players and the KCC founder's sons Chung Mong-ik and Chung Mong-jin were all Yongsan alumni.

Yongsan High School was mentioned in the film Rebound, a biographical film about Busan Joongang High School's run to the 2012 National Basketball Championship final. The two schools eventually met in the final. Yongsan High School predictably won but Joongang High School, having reached the final with only five available players and no substitutes, attracted much media attention as the tournament underdog.
