= Kyungbock High School =

Coordinates: 37.5870°N 126.9715°E

Kyungbock High School (경복고등학교, 景福高等學校)
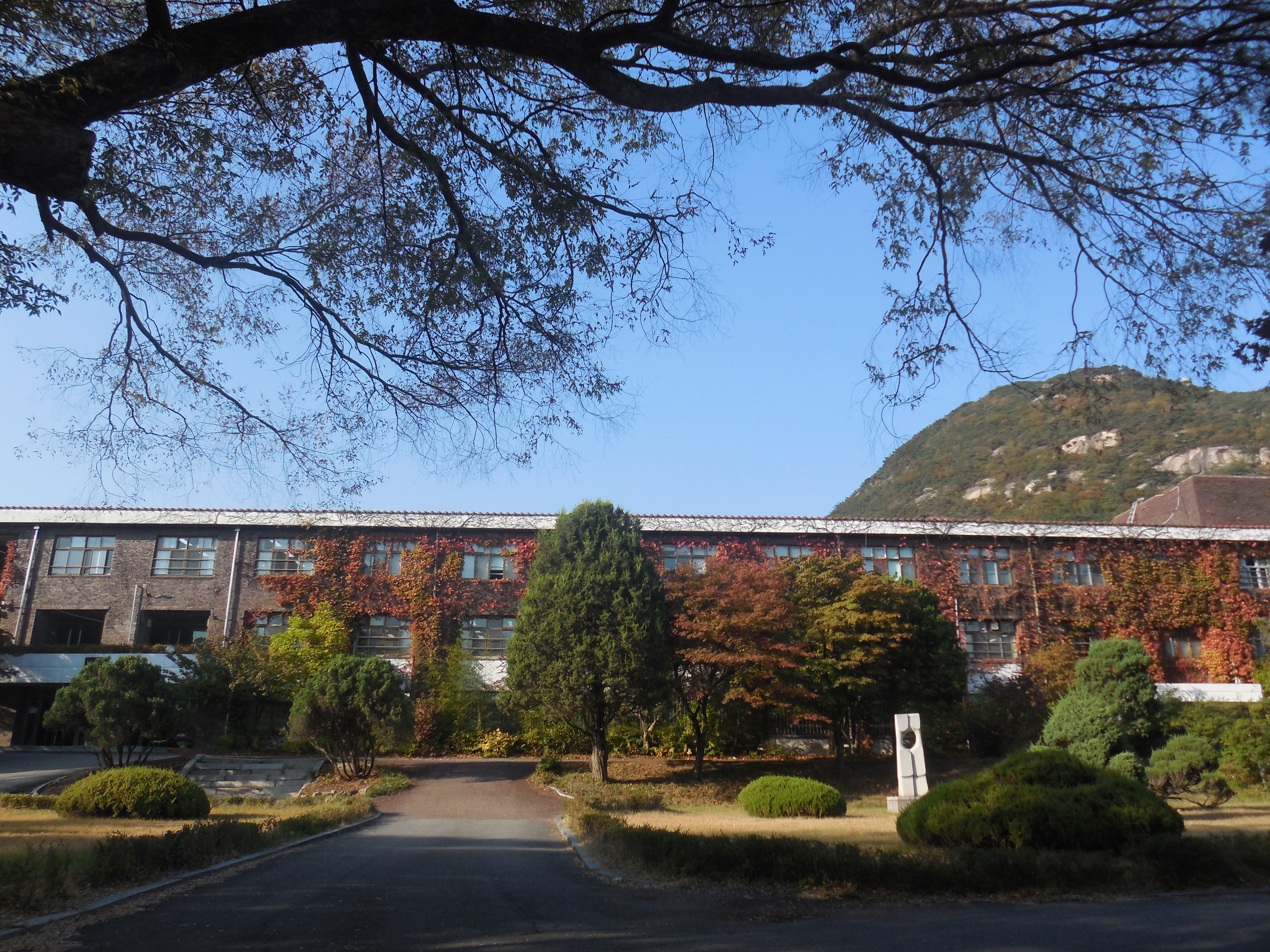
- Kyungbock High School in 2015
- Seoul; South Korea

Information
- Type: Public, Day
- Motto: 至誠 闊達 剛健 協同 지성, 활달, 강건, 협동; Diligence, Courage, Strength, Cooperation
- Established: 1921
- Head of school: jung man sik
- Gender: Boys
- Enrollment: 1800 total
- Average class size: 38 students
- Campus: Urban, 50,000 square metres (540,000 sq ft)
- Color: Blue
- Website: kyungbock.hs.kr

Kyungbock High School (Korean: 경복고등학교) is one of the oldest modern secondary school in South Korea. It is located in Jongno-gu, Seoul, near Gyeongbok Palace, after which it is named. It was established on April 18, 1921. The school's original name was the No. 2 High School of Gyeongseong (경성제이고등보통학교). It has changed its name several times before settling on the name "Kyungbock" in 1938.

== History ==
Kyungbock High School is one of the oldest modern secondary schools in South Korea. It was established on April 20, 1921, after Kyunggi High School, which originated from Gwanlim Middle School. Kyunggi High School was the first high school of Gyeongseong at the time, and Kyungbock High school was named the second. Its main building was built on June 20, 1921. In 1938, the school changed its name to Kyungbock Middle School due to its proximity to Gyeongbok Palace. In 1946, right after emancipation from the Japanese Colonial Rule, the school extended its admission to younger students. It educated students of grades 7-12 at the time. When the government mandated the "3+3" middle school and high school system, the school was separated into Kyungbock Middle School (grades 7 to 9) and Kyungbock High School (grades 10-12). Kyungbock Middle School was closed in 1971. In 1974, high school entrance exams in South Korea were also abolished. In 1985, The school built its new Main building, which is used today.

In 2009, Kyungbock was nominated by the Ministry of Education, Science and Technology as a "curriculum innovation school". It has been renovating school facilities and school curriculum since then, supported by the Ministry's fund aid. The school can select 50% of its faculty members, and plan its curriculum in a limited amount by its own methods.

Since 2017, Kyungbock High School has been designated as a science-core high school (과학중점고등학교), a designation under a South Korean Ministry of Education program for general high schools that operate an intensive curriculum in science and mathematics.

== Facilities ==
=== Academic facilities ===
- Kyungbock Building (경복관)
- Buk Ak Building (북악관)
- Building 1 (1호관)
- Building 2 (2호관)
- Building 3 (3호관)

=== Student facilities ===
- Physical Education Center (체육관)
- Main Hall (대강당)
- Art Center (예능관)

=== Kyungbock Memorial House ===
On the campus, there are 3 storage buildings that were built in 2004 for the use of arranging class reunions and annual visits of graduates. The building is to commemorate all that Kyungbock has achieved and to encourage attending students and young graduates to keep alive the tradition and reputation of Kyungbock. In the basement there is a Kyungbock Alumni Association branch where two graduates are working as full-time alumni officers. On the first floor there is a Kyungbock Memorial where memorabilia of Kyungbock from almost 90 years ago are on display. Finally on the second floor there is a small banquet occasionally used for class reunions and annual scholarship endowment.

== Activities ==
- Kyung In Yeok Jun (경인역전): former annual marathon festival
- Annual scholarship endowment program: the Kyungbock Alumni Association awards scholarships to 45 students every semester.

== Athletics ==
Kyungbock is known for its sports teams. Its student athletes have represented South Korea at youth level in various sports and many have gone on to the senior national team and played professionally.

Kyungbock is one of the few high schools in the country with an ice hockey program, which has been established since the 1990s. Its biggest rival is Kyunggi High School in Gangnam, with the two schools often meeting in the finals of the high school championships.

Kyungbock has a well-established basketball program and is a major feeder to the "big 3" universities in college basketball: Yonsei University, Korea University and Chung-Ang University. During the 1960s to 1980s, it first gained a reputation as one of the Seoul's top schools for high school basketball, along with Whimoon and Yongsan High Schools, the latter of which is still considered one of Kyungbock's fiercest rivals. As of 2021, Kyungbock has produced five overall number 1 draft picks in the annual Korean Basketball League rookie draft, the most of any high school in the country.

== Notable alumni ==
- Cho Yang-ho, chairman of the Hanjin Group
- Choi Jun-yong, basketball player
- Chun Hee-chul, head coach of Seoul SK Knights
- Chung Mong-koo, Hyundai Motors chair
- Gong Hyung-jin, actor
- Jeon Jun-beom, basketball player
- Kim Bum, actor
- Kim Jung-sik (DJ Tukutz), DJ and producer of Epik High
- Kim Seong-hwan, cartoonist
- Kim Won-jung, retired ice hockey player
- Lee Don-ku, ice hockey player
- Lee Han-dong, politician, former Prime Minister of South Korea
- Lee In-je, politician
- Lee Jay-hyun, chairman of CJ Group
- Lee Jae-yong, vice chairman of Samsung, serving as de facto head
- Lee Jong-hyun, basketball player
- Lee Jong-wook, director-general of the World Health Organization
- Lee Soo-man, founder of SM Entertainment
- Moon Hee-sang, politician
- Moon Seong-gon, basketball player
- Park Chan-hee, basketball player
- Park Seung-cheol, doctor
- Shin Dong-yup, comedian
- Yang Dong-geun, actor
- Yoo Jae-hak, basketball coach
- You Hee-yeol, pop singer
- Woo Ji-won, retired basketball player
