= Whimoon High School =

Private High School in Gangnam, Seoul

Coordinates: 37°30′18″N 127°03′43″E

- 휘문고등학교
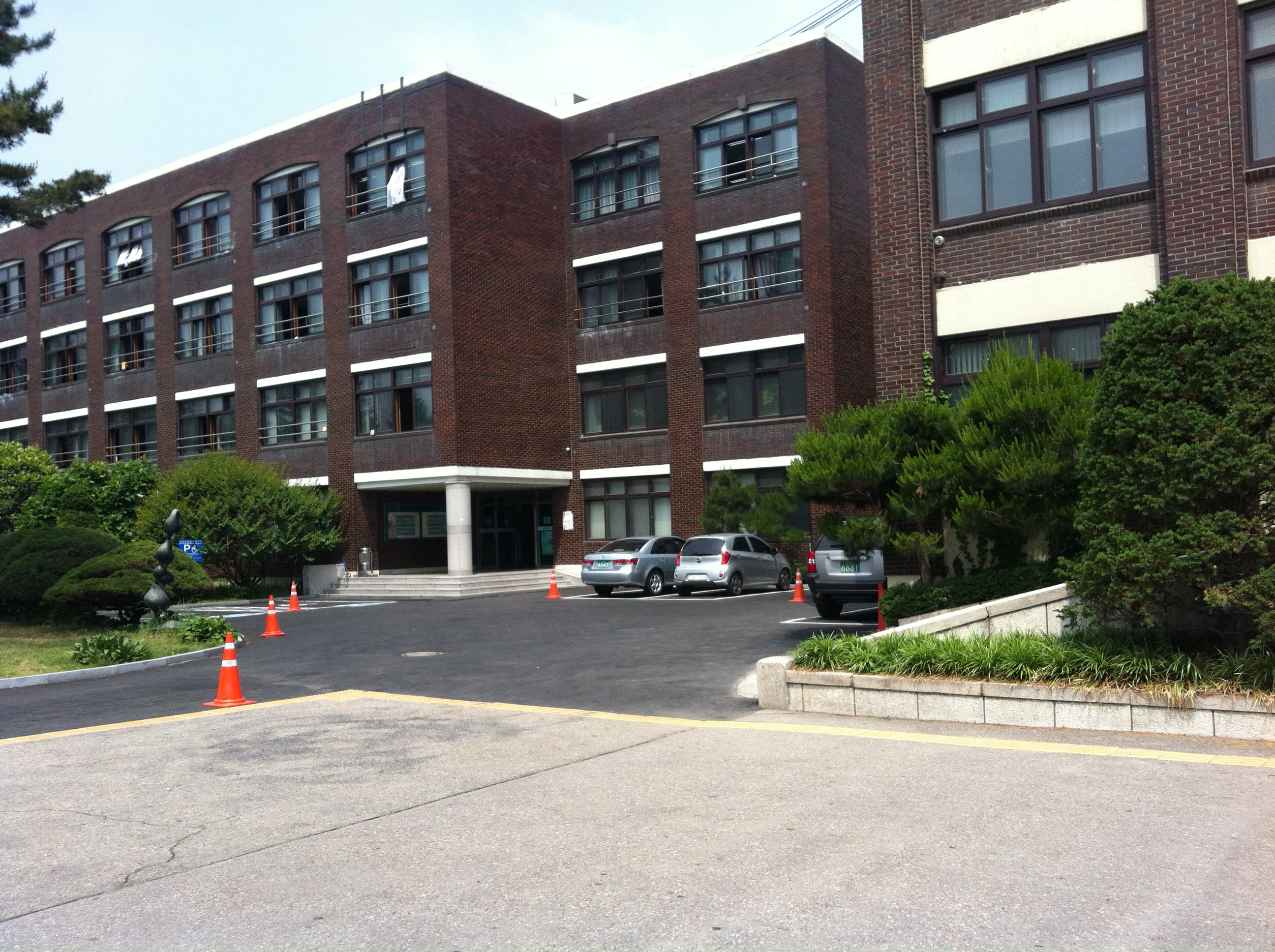
- Southern building of the school (2012)
- Gangnam-gu, Seoul; South Korea

Information
- Type: Private
- Motto: 큰사람이 되자 (Be a great man)
- Established: 1904
- Chairman: Kim Jung-bae
- Faculty: approx. 79 (2023)
- Gender: Boys
- Enrollment: ~1209 (2023)
- Tree: Zelkova serrata
- Flower: Magnolia denudata
- Song: 휘문고등학교 교가 (Song of the Whimoon)
- Website: whimoon.hs.kr

- Whimoon High School
- Hangul: 휘문고등학교
- Hanja: 徽文高等學校
- RR: Hwimun godeunghakgyo
- MR: Hwimun kodŭnghakkyo

Whimoon High School (Korean: 휘문고등학교) is a private high school at Daechi-dong, Seoul, South Korea.

It is one of the oldest and most prestigious high schools in South Korea. It is known for having extremely competitive admissions and strong college admission outcomes.

== School history ==
September 1, 1904: Ha Jung Min-hwi retooled 'Gwangseong Uisook'(廣成義塾)

May 1, 1906: Ha Jeong Min-hwi founded the school and opened it under the school name 'Hwimun(徽文)' given by Emperor

1907: Foundation of the baseball team

March 1910: The first graduation ceremony of Whimun Uisuk was held (32 graduates)

January 1918: renamed 'private whimoon high school' (4 years)

1921: Foundation of the 'Korean Language Research Society' (the parent body of the 'Korean Language Society') by gathering teachers and alumni, including the principal Lim Kyung-jae

1925: The Basketball Club was founded

August 1951: Middle and high schools were separated according to the reorganization of the school system and renamed 'whimoon High School' (3-year system)

February 1978: relocated the teacher from Boljae (Wonwon-dong, Jongno-gu) where it has been for 72 years to its current location (Daechi-dong, Gangnam-gu)

March 2011: Authorized as an autonomous private high school

February 2018: The 110th graduation ceremony is held

== History ==
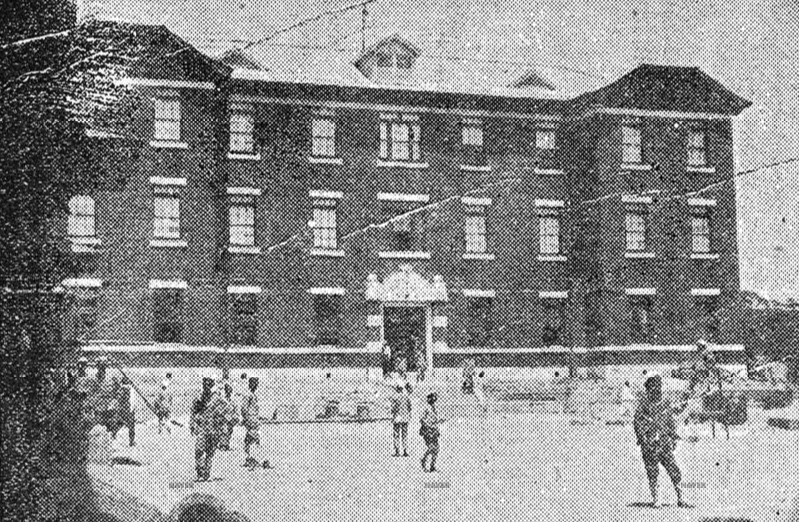
Whimoon High School and Middle School Building (Korean: 휘문고등보통학교) at Jongno, Seoul in year 1922

The school was first opened as Kwangsŏngŭisuk (광성의숙; 廣成義塾) in 1904 by Min Yŏng-hwi, nephew of Empress Myeongseong. It was run out of his home, with an initial class size of 30 students. The name "Whimoon" was given by Emperor Gojong in 1906, and the school building was then built in Seoul. In August, the first entrance examinations were held, with 130 students accepted. Though an independent school, it was established in connection to the emperor so the school facilities, including a print shop, libraries and laboratory equipment, were better than other schools.

In 1914 Whimoon Euisuk became Whimoon Private Normal School and then became Whimoon Middle School in 1928, in line with the changing educational policies of the era. During the Japanese colonial era, the school silently played a role in the Korean independence movement by continuously teaching the Korean language despite it being banned by the colonial government. It first became known for its liberal school culture, an extensive sports program and placing equal emphasis on humanities and liberal arts alongside languages and the sciences. At that time, all schoolboys had to keep a military-style buzz cut and had to abide by a very strict dress code. However, Whimoon did not require its boys to adhere to that mandated hair and dress code. Instead, their students were only expected to maintain a neat appearance and had several types of uniforms to choose from, which was unheard of. The unique school culture would persist into the 1970s.

Initially Whimoon was a six-year school. With the 1957 government policy of "3+3" (3 years of middle school and 3 years of high school), Whimoon was legally split into two separate schools: Whimoon Middle School and Whimoon High School. Both schools still maintain an affiliation, with a large number of alumni from the post-war years having attended both schools.

Originally, the location of the school was middle of Seoul (Jongro-gu). In 1977 and 1979 both schools moved to their current locations in Gangnam, across the Han River. In 2010, it became a self-governing (private) school.

In 2018 an audit by the Seoul Metropolitan Office of Education revealed that Whimoon Euisuk, the school corporation containing Whimoon Middle and High School, as well as its honorary chairman, embezzled ₩3.8 billion from renting the school building as a place of worship for a church.

== Admissions ==
By the law of private school education, Whimoon High School was selected to be a privately operated high school above numerous other schools. The students who have a higher GPA than other students in their middle school can apply to Whimoon High School.

== Sports ==
Whimoon High School is an early pioneer in championing the notion of the "student-athlete" in South Korean education. Students were encouraged to join a sports club to complement their academic pursuits. The two sports which the school is best known for – baseball and basketball – were introduced in 1907 and 1927 respectively.

In 2010 Whimoon Baseball team won the President's National High School Baseball Championship for the fifth time. More recently, in 2014, the baseball team won the Bonghwang High School Baseball Tournament, considered to be one of the country's premier high school baseball tournaments.

It was one of the earliest high schools to introduce basketball and has continuously produced players who have gone on to play professionally in the Korean Basketball League and the South Korean national team. During the 1960s to 1980s, it gained a reputation as one of the city's top schools for high school basketball, along with Yongsan and Kyungbock High Schools. Since the 2000s, Whimoon has become better known for baseball and the basketball rivalry has been more centered on Yongsan and Kyungbock.

== Alumni ==
- Bang Young-ung, novelist
- Cha Jun-hwan, figure skater
- Chung Eui-sun, chairman of Hyundai Motor Group
- Gim Yujeong, a novelist
- Hyun Joo-yup, retired basketball player
- Kim Dong-ryul, singer-songwriter
- Kim Dong-wan, singer and actor, member of Shinhwa
- Kim Han-jung, National Congressman
- Kim Hoon, a novelist
- Kim Jong-hak, film director and producer
- Kim Jun-myeon (Suho), singer and actor, member of EXO
- Kim Min-gyu, baseball player
- Kim Min-su (Don Spike), musician
- Kim Seok-woo (Rowoon), singer and actor, member of SF9
- Jang Hang-jun, film director
- Jeong Ji-yong, poet
- Lee Dong-gun, actor
- Lee Jung-hoo, baseball player
- Lee Seung-hwan, singer
- Park Min-woo, baseball player
- Seo Jang-hoon, television personality and retired basketball player
- Shin Dong-pa, retired basketball player and coach
- Shin Sung-rok, television and musical theater actor
- Sohn Suk-hee, news anchor and journalist
- Yoo Ji-tae, actor
- kim-min-seok, baseball player
