= Kang Dong-hee =

South Korean basketball player

Personal information
- Born: 20 December 1966 (age 59) Imsil, South Korea
- Listed height: 180 cm (5 ft 11 in)

Career information
- College: Chung-Ang University
- Playing career: 1990–2004
- Position: Guard
- Coaching career: 2004–2013

Career history

Playing
- 1990–2002: Busan Kia Enterprise / Ulsan Mobis Automons
- 2002–2004: Changwon LG Sakers

Coaching
- 2004–2005: Changwon LG Sakers (assistant coach)
- 2005–2013: Wonju DB Promy (assistant coach / head coach)

Career highlights
- As player: KBL Championship (1997); KBL regular season champions (1997); 6× KBL Best 5 (1997, 1998—2001, 2003); KBL Most Valuable Player Award (1997); KBL Playoffs MVP (1997); As coach: KBL Championship (2008); KBL regular season champions (2008, 2012)

- Korean name
- Hangul: 강동희
- Hanja: 姜東熙
- RR: Gang Donghui
- MR: Kang Tonghŭi

Kang Dong-hee (born 20 December 1966) is a South Korean former basketball player and coach. He competed in the men's tournament at the 1996 Summer Olympics. In his prime, Kang was regarded as the best domestic point guard of his generation and was nicknamed "Wizard of the Court" (코트의 마법사).

== Early life ==
Kang spent his schooling years in Incheon and was first introduced to basketball in elementary school but stopped playing for a number of years due to his short stature. His interest was reignited when some soldiers from the nearby military base visited his middle school and played basketball with the students. He attended Songdo High School, one of the oldest high school basketball programs in Gyeonggi Province.

== Playing career ==
Kang played for Chung-Ang University. Together with Hur Jae and Kim Yoo-taek, the "Hur-Dong-Taek Trio" formed the core of the Chung-Ang University team which dominated college basketball during the 1980s and still regarded as one of the most legendary group of players in Chung-Ang history. He joined Kim and Hur at the Busan-based amateur basketball team of Kia in 1990 and played a major role in the team's dominance of the pre-KBL semi-professional league.

During the inaugural professional KBL season, Busan Kia achieved a rare "double" of winning the championship and topping the league table while Kang had the rare honor of winning both the regular season MVP and playoffs MVP. He averaged 15.6 points and 7.3 assists in the regular season and 18.0 points and 6.0 assists in the play-offs. In 2001, Kia was bought over by Hyundai and became the presently-named Ulsan Hyundai Mobis Phoebus. Kang stayed with the reorganized team for another season before joining Changwon LG Sakers. He retired at the end of the 2003-04 season, the same time as Hur.

At the time of his retirement, Kang was the first player in KBL history to record 2000 assists and score a triple-double. He led the league in assists for four seasons.

== Coaching career ==
Kang went into coaching, joining the coaching staff of Wonju DB Promy in 2005 and then serving as head coach from 2009 to 2013. His tenure as a coach came to an end due to his indictment for match-fixing.

=== Controversy ===
In August 2013, the Uijeongbu District Court indicted Kang on four counts of match-fixing and illegally accepting money from brokers and sentenced him to ten months in prison and a fine of 47 million won. He was reportedly the first head coach of a professional team from the four major domestic team sports (football, basketball, baseball and volleyball) to be arrested, charged and imprisoned for match-fixing. The investigation into Kang was linked to a wider crackdown and investigation into illegal sports betting which involved a number of personalities from the entertainment industry, including Kim Yong-man and Lee Soo-geun. In a separate disciplinary hearing, the KBL voted to expel him as a registered coach that September. Since serving his sentence, he largely keeps a low profile and holds seminars and talks on the dangers of gambling addiction. In 2021, he sent a petition to the KBL to reconsider the expulsion, to which the KBL reaffirmed its initial stance and declined his petition.

Kang appeared on the JTBC sports variety program Let's Play Basketball (뭉쳐야 쏜다) in an episode scheduled to air in June 2021, the theme being "National Basketball Festival", the main basketball competition of the pre-KBL era. He had been invited as he was a member of the Busan Kia team of the 1980s and early 1990s which dominated the competition. After JTBC released the trailer online, Kang's appearance was met with much negativity from viewers, leading JTBC to issue an apology. His full shots were edited out of the episode.

== Personal life ==
Kang married Lee Kwang-sun in 2004 and they have two sons. He was the last of the "Hur-Dong-Taek Trio" to marry and also has two sons like Hur and Kim.

== See also ==
- List of Korean Basketball League annual statistical leaders
