= Yang Hong-seok (basketball) =

South Korean basketball player

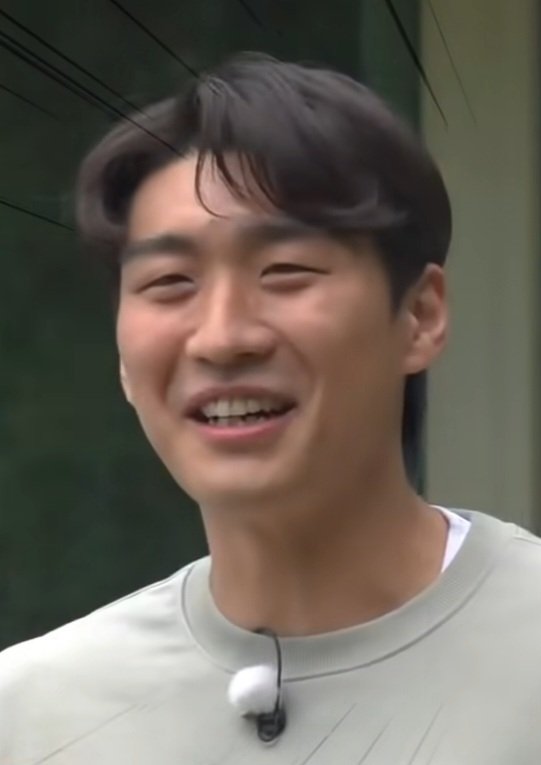

No. 11 – Changwon LG Sakers
- Position: Forward
- League: Korean Basketball League

Personal information
- Born: July 2, 1997 (age 29) Jeonju, South Korea
- Listed height: 6 ft 6 in (1.98 m)

Career information
- High school: Busan Jungang High School
- College: Chung-Ang University
- KBL draft: 2017: 1st round, 2nd overall pick
- Playing career: 2017–present

Career history
- 2017–2023: Suwon KT Sonicboom
- 2023–present: Changwon LG Sakers
- 2024–2025: → Sangmu (loan)

Career highlights
- 2× KBL Best 5 (2019, 2021); KBL Most Improved Player Award (2019)

- Korean name
- Hangul: 양홍석
- Hanja: 梁洪碩
- RR: Yang Hongseok
- MR: Yang Hongsŏk

Yang Hong-seok (born July 2, 1997) is a South Korean basketball player. He plays for Korean Basketball League team Changwon LG Sakers and the South Korean national team.

== Early life ==
Born and raised in Jeonju, Yang moved to Busan as a middle school student. He caught the attention of college recruiters after leading his high school basketball team to stellar results in various high school tournaments. As he was much taller than his peers, he played as a center and only converted into a forward in college.

== College career ==
Yang chose Chung-Ang University over traditional powerhouses Yonsei University and Korea University. The unfancied Chung-Ang team managed to finish runners-up in the U-League table and were knocked out of the play-offs in the semi-final stage. Despite being passed over for the College Rookie of the Year Award, Yang drew attention as the only freshman to average 20 or more points. He averaged 26.7 points, 2.4 assists and 2.9 steals.

His performances did not go unnoticed by national team selectors and he was called up to the senior national team for the 2017 William Jones Cup and FIBA Asia Cup. He chose to declare eligibility early, joining the 2017 KBL rookie draft.

== Professional career ==
Yang was considered a strong contender for the first pick along with Yonsei point guard Heo Hoon and was the second overall pick, behind Heo. He was almost drafted by Changwon LG Sakers, but they had traded their pick and another player to Busan KT Sonicboom in exchange for Cho Sung-min in an agreement before the 2017–18 season. As one of the youngest and least experienced players in the squad, he was often used as a substitute player to gain experience rather than sent out to the D-League reserve team. He recorded his first double-double in March, against Anyang KGC and finished the season with an average of 7.57 points. Although considered one of the top prospects of his draft class, his rookie season was overshadowed by his team's lackluster performances in the regular season.

Yang began to establish himself as a starter during the 2018-19 season, often contributing points in the double digits together with Heo. In January, he achieved two records. During the January 9 game against Incheon Electro Land Elephants, he scored 27 points, his personal best, in a 88-73 loss. Weeks later against Seoul Samsung Thunders, he became the youngest player in KBL history to record a triple-double at age 21 years and 6 months, breaking Joo Hee-jung's record (age 23 years). He ended the season with nine double-doubles, his personal best and won the Most Improved Player Award and named in the KBL Best 5 of the season. He became the youngest player to rank first in the KBL All-Star Game fan vote.

The 2019-20 season was a mixed bag for Yang. While he continued a fruitful scoring partnership with Heo, he came under criticism for neglecting his defensive duties and for his inconsistent form.

During the 2020-21 season, Yang led the league in rebounds among domestic players and also achieved ten double-doubles in the points and rebounds categories (domestic players), becoming the first player since the 2017-18 season and the first forward (KBL registered position) since Lee Seung-jun in 2012-13 to do so in those statistical categories. He achieved the milestone during the semi-finals of the play-offs against Anyang KGC and infamously continued to play even after his injured ear had to be bandaged following a collision with Anyang KGC's Moon Seong-gon. Anyang KGC went on to win the semi-final round to advance to the championship finals but Moon and Anyang manager Kim Seung-gi both publicly singled out Yang for praise. At the end of the season, he was named into the Best 5 for the season during the KBL's annual awards ceremony and also voted into the Best 5 and voted the Best Young Player by his KBL peers in Rookie the Basket magazine's annual Players' Choice Awards.

Yang recovered from a pre-season injury in time for the 2021-22 season. In January, during the loss against Daegu KOGAS Pegasus, he achieved his second triple-double (scoring 28 or more points), becoming only the third domestic player in KBL history to do so after Hur Jae and Hyun Joo-yup.

== National team career ==
Despite only playing a year of college basketball, Yang was selected for the 2017 FIBA Asia Cup. He was mostly a substitute player, averaging around 5 minutes per game, but managed to score against Kazakhstan and the Philippines.

Yang was called up to the national team for the 2018 Asian Games and sent to the 3-on-3 team. They reached the finals but narrowly lost to China in overtime.

Yang participated in the 2019 William Jones Cup and in several qualifiers for the 2019 FIBA Basketball World Cup. He was ultimately cut from the final 12-man squad for the World Cup as coach Kim Sang-shik opted for a more experienced line-up.

== Personal life ==
Yang has a brother Yang Sung-hoon, who is a year younger. The brothers had declared for the 2017 draft together but Yang Sung-hoon went undrafted and ultimately continued with his university education.

On March 28, 2024, basketball officials announced that Yang would enter mandatory military service on May 20, 2024, and was assigned to the Korea Armed Forces Athletic Corps Sangmu basketball team, and would be discharged on November 19, 2025, and will be able to return at the beginning of the 2025–2026 season.
