= Lee Jong-hyun (basketball) =

South Korean basketball player

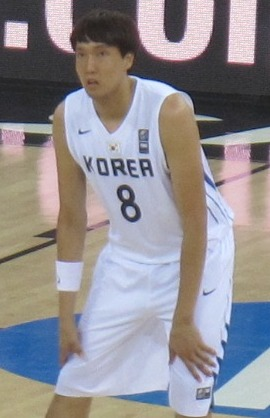
- Lee at the 2014 FIBA World Cup

No. 32 – Yamagata Wyverns
- Position: Center
- League: B2 League

Personal information
- Born: February 5, 1994 (age 32) Seoul, South Korea
- Listed height: 6 ft 8 in (2.03 m)
- Listed weight: 225 lb (102 kg)

Career information
- High school: Kyungbock
- College: Korea University
- KBL draft: 2016: 1st round, 1st overall pick
- Playing career: 2016–present

Career history
- 2016–2020: Ulsan Hyundai Mobis Phoebus
- 2020–2023: Goyang Orion Orions / Goyang Day One Jumpers
- 2023: Jeonju KCC Egis
- 2023–2025: Anyang Jung Kwan Jang Red Boosters
- 2025–present: Yamagata Wyverns

Career highlights
- FIBA World Cup blocks leader (2014); KBL Championship (2019)
Medals
Men's basketball
Representing South Korea
Asian Games
Gold medal – first place	2014 Incheon	Team
EABA Championship
Silver medal – second place	2017 Nagano
FIBA Asia Cup
Bronze medal – third place	2013 Philippines
Bronze medal – third place	2017 Beirut
William Jones Cup
Silver medal – second place	2016 Taipei

Lee Jong-hyun (born February 5, 1994) is a South Korean professional basketball player for the Yamagata Wyverns of the B2 League.

== Early years ==
Lee started playing basketball in elementary school under the influence of his father, a former basketball player with Busan Kia Enterprise (which is now Ulsan Hyundai Mobis Phoebus). He was schoolmates with Moon Seong-gon and Choi Jun-yong at Kyungbock High School and they were dubbed the "Kyungbock Trio" by rival high school teams for their well-rounded offensive capabilities.

== College career ==
Lee would join Moon, a year his senior, at Korea University while Choi went to rivals Yonsei University. At that time, his teammates also included Kang Sang-jae and Lee Seoung-hyun and they were mostly competing against a Kim Jong-kyu and Kim Min-goo-inspired Kyung Hee University in the U-League. During his freshman year, he played a pivotal role in Korea University winning the MBC Cup for the first time in seventeen years and was named MVP of the tournament.

He declared as a prospect in the 2015 NBA draft on April 22, 2015. As an early entrant in the 2015 NBA draft, he went undrafted. He returned to Korea University to continue his college career. During his junior year, he and Kang Sang-jae, dubbed "Twin Towers" because of their height, led Korea University to a surprise win over a Sangmu team composed of experienced KBL players fulfilling their mandatory military service.

== Professional career ==
Lee was considered one of the "big 3", along with Kang and Choi Jun-yong, of the 2016 KBL rookie draft and strong contenders for the first pick of the first round. He was drafted first overall by Ulsan Hyundai Mobis Phoebus. After an underwhelming start to his rookie season, he scored 24 points and 18 rebounds in January against Changwon LG Sakers.

Throughout 2018 Lee struggled with injury. In February he ruptured his Achilles tendon which effectively ended his season. He spent the off-season in rehabilitation and recovered in time for the 2018–19 season. However, he fractured his left patella in a December game. He was ruled out of the rest of the season as it required surgery.

In November 2020, Lee was traded to Goyang Orion Orions for Choi Jin-soo in a player swap.

== National team career ==
Lee was first called up to the senior national team while in college, participating in the 2013 FIBA Asia Championship. He participated at the 2014 FIBA Basketball World Cup and the Asian Games that same year. The South Koreans won gold for the first time since 2002, which meant that Lee and his teammates who had yet to enlist for mandatory military service were granted exemptions. He missed out on the 2019 FIBA Basketball World Cup due to his injury.
