= Song Kyo-chang =

South Korean basketball player

No. 9 – Busan KCC Egis
- Position: Forward
- League: Korean Basketball League

Personal information
- Born: 3 July 1996 (age 30) Yongin, Gyeonggi Province, South Korea
- Listed height: 199.5 cm (6 ft 7 in)
- Listed weight: 95 kg (209 lb)

Career information
- High school: Samil Commercial High School
- KBL draft: 2015: 1st round, 3rd overall pick
- Playing career: 2015–present

Career history
- 2015–present: Jeonju KCC Egis/Busan KCC Egis
- 2022–2023: → Sangmu (loan)

Career highlights
- KBL regular season champions (2021); KBL Most Valuable Player Award (2021); 2× KBL Best 5 (2020, 2021); KBL Most Improved Player Award (2017); KBL Defensive Best 5 (2018)

- Korean name
- Hangul: 송교창
- Hanja: 宋喬昌
- RR: Song Gyochang
- MR: Song Kyoch'ang

Song Kyo-chang (born 3 July 1996) is a South Korean professional basketball player. He currently plays for Busan KCC Egis in the Korean Basketball League and the South Korean national team.

== Early life ==
Song was introduced to basketball in elementary school but preferred baseball as his lack of height was considered a disadvantage. By the time he entered middle school, he had grown much taller than his peers, prompting him to switch back to basketball. He graduated from Samil Commercial High School in Suwon. Samil was known as one of the top basketball schools outside of Seoul and he caught the attention of scouts, especially after his performances with the youth national teams. He opted against playing college basketball in order to be eligible for the 2015 KBL rookie draft.

== Career ==
=== Professional ===
Song was drafted by Jeonju KCC Egis as the third overall pick. It was the first time since 2005 a high school graduate was drafted so early in the first round. He was sent to the D League reserve team to gain more regular playing time and was gradually integrated into the professional team towards the end of the season.

Song began the 2019-20 season on a sour note, being ejected from the first game of the season for accumulated fouls. He averaged 15.05 points and led the league for points among domestic-born players. He was named into the KBL Best 5 and nominated for the Most Valuable Player Award but lost to Busan KT Sonicboom guard Heo Hoon. He was the top scoring domestic player, overtaking assists leader Heo by a slim margin of 0.1 points.

The 2020-21 was a break-out season for Song, who averaged 15.6 points and was regularly his team's top scorer in games. Song was named into the Best 5 and won the KBL Most Valuable Player Award, becoming the first "prep to pro" player to win it. Additionally, he became the youngest player to reach 3,000 career points. With his five-year contract ending after the season, Song re-signed after successfully negotiating his contract. His new contract meant that he was the league's highest-paid domestic player.

Weeks into the 2021–21 season, Song suffered an open fracture of his left fourth finger during the away game against Daegu KOGAS Pegasus. He had collided with Andrew Nicholson mid-air while attempting to block the latter's dunk and landed awkwardly on his left hand. The career-threatening injury required surgery as the entire ligament was ruptured, sidelining him until January. In December, he was named Male Basketball Player of the Year at the Dong-a Sports Awards honoring domestic professional athletes across all disciplines. He returned on schedule, making his comeback in the January game against Goyang Orion Orions.

On May 16, 2022, Song enlisted for mandatory military service and was assigned to the Korea Armed Forces Athletic Corps' Sangmu basketball team. He is scheduled to be discharged in November 15, 2023.

=== National team ===
Song participated in the 2015 FIBA Under-19 World Championship where he averaged 16.5 points and ranked fifth in the tournament.

Song was first called-up to the senior national team in 2017. He participated in the 2019 William Jones Cup and in several qualifiers for the 2019 FIBA Basketball World Cup. However, he was ultimately cut from the final 12-man squad for the World Cup as head coach Kim Sang-shik opted for a more experienced line-up.

== Personal life ==
Song enrolled at Kyung Hee Cyber University and completed a degree in sports management.
