= Choi Jun-yong =

South Korean basketball player

Choi Jun-yong 최준용
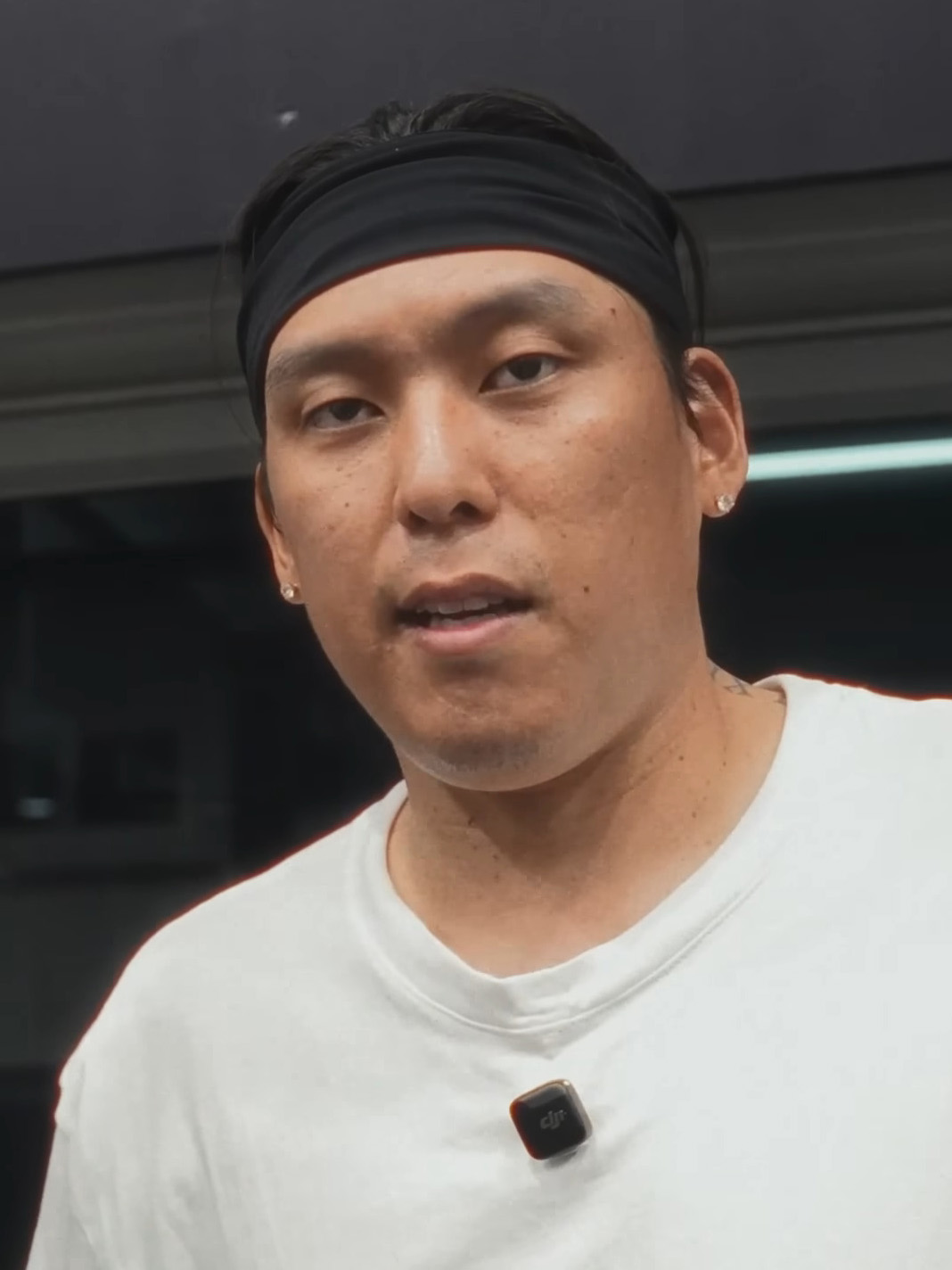
- Choi in 2025

No. 2 – Busan KCC Egis
- Position: Forward
- League: KBL

Personal information
- Born: April 4, 1994 (age 32) Daegu, South Korea
- Listed height: 6 ft 7 in (2.01 m)

Career information
- High school: Kyungbock High School
- College: Yonsei University
- KBL draft: 2016: 1st round, 2nd overall pick
- Playing career: 2016–present

Career history
- 2016–2023: Seoul SK Knights
- 2023–present: Busan KCC Egis

Career highlights
- KBL Most Valuable Player (2022); 4× KBL champion (2018, 2022, 2024, 2026)

- Korean name
- Hangul: 최준용
- Hanja: 崔俊龍
- RR: Choe Junyong
- MR: Ch'oe Chunyong

Choi Jun-yong (Korean: 최준용; born April 4, 1994) is a South Korean basketball player for Busan KCC Egis and the South Korean national team. He has previously also played for the Seoul SK Knights.

== Career ==
=== High school and college career ===
Choi attended Kyungbock High School and was classmates with Lee Jong-hyun. While at Kyungbock, he, Lee and their senior Moon Seong-gon, were dubbed the "Kyungbock Trio" by rival high school teams for their well-rounded offensive capabilities. Moon and Lee went on to Korea University while Choi was recruited by Yonsei University.

During his senior year, Choi captained Yonsei to a clean sweep of the U-League regular season title and championship and the MBC Cup, the first time since 2005 Yonsei has won it. He was also named MVP of the MBC Cup tournament. At that time his teammates included future MVP Heo Hoon and future KBL Rookie of the Year Ahn Young-joon. He declared eligibility for the 2016 KBL draft.

=== Professional ===
Choi was considered one of the "big 3", along with Lee and Kang Sang-jae, of the 2016 KBL rookie draft and strong contenders for the first pick of the first round. He was drafted by Seoul SK Knights as the second pick.

After an uneventful rookie season, Choi began to grow into his role during the 2017-18 season and played a bigger role in Seoul SK Knights' second-place finish in the regular season and KBL Championship win. He averaged 9.5 points, 4.2 rebounds and 3.2 assists. After a 2018-19 season mostly plagued by injury, he returned to the side but found himself having to battle with veteran Kim Sun-hyung for a spot in the starting 5.

On December 8, 2020, it was reported that Choi had been suspended for three games by his team after he accidentally leaked a nude photograph of his teammate on his social media. He and his team immediately posted an apology, explaining that the teammate involved was also a close friend and had accepted the apology and that Choi would serve the suspension with immediate effect. The KBL further extended the suspension to five games and fined him 3 million won.

In the 2021–22 season, Choi won the KBL Most Valuable Player Award and won his second KBL championship.

== National team ==
He participated at the 2017 FIBA Asia Cup.
