= Han Ki-bum =

South Korean basketball player

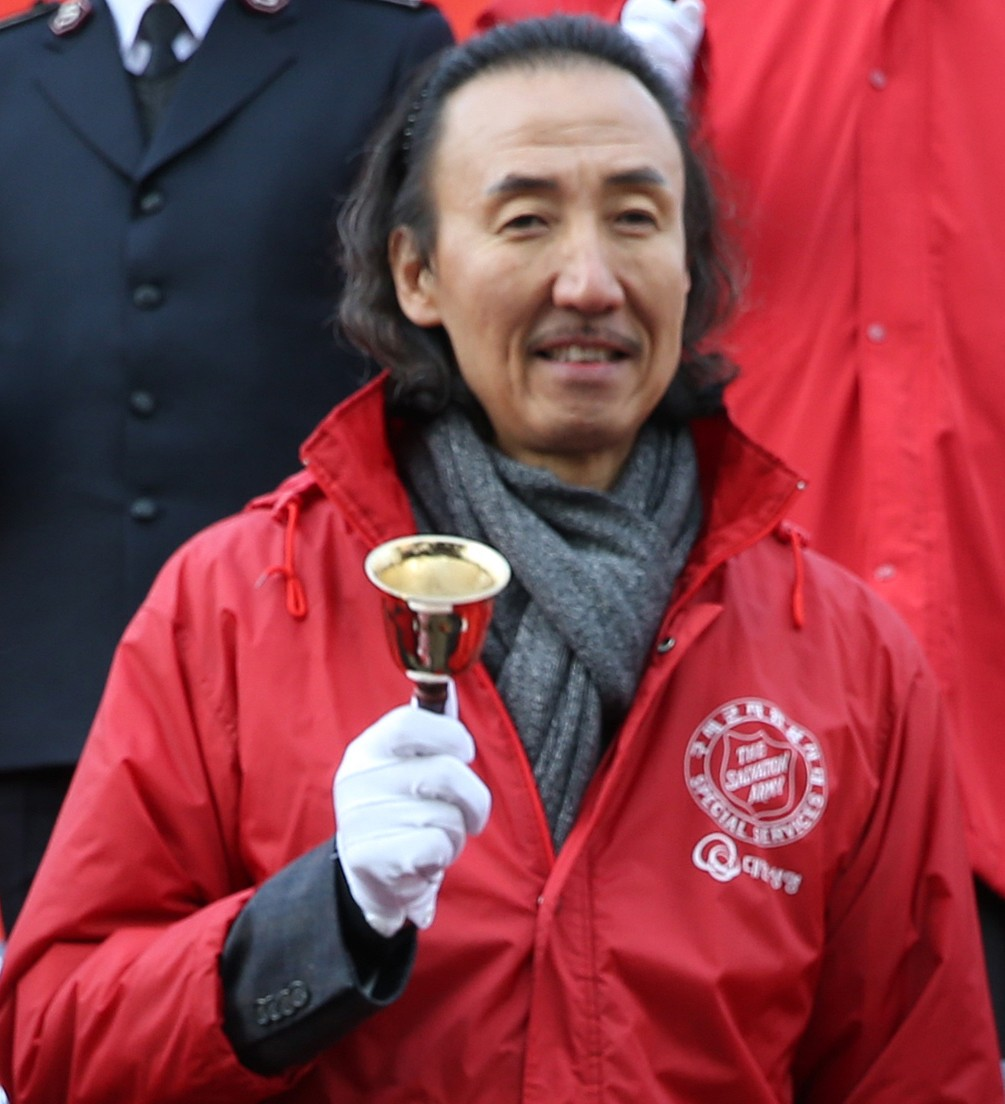
- Han in 2012

Personal information
- Born: 7 June 1964 (age 62) Seobuk District, Cheonan, South Korea
- Height: 207 cm (6 ft 9 in)
- Weight: 85 kg (187 lb)
Medal record
Men's basketball
Representing South Korea
Asian Games
| Silver medal – second place | 1986 Seoul | Team |

Korean name
- Hangul: 한기범
- Hanja: 韓基範
- RR: Han Gibeom
- MR: Han Kibŏm

Han Ki-bum (Korean: 한기범, born 7 June 1964) is a South Korean basketball player. He competed in the men's tournament at the 1988 Summer Olympics.
