= Moon Seong-gon =

South Korean basketball player

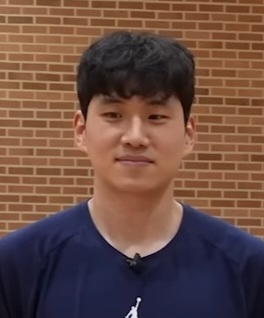

No. 10 – Suwon KT Sonicboom
- Position: Forward
- League: Korean Basketball League

Personal information
- Born: May 9, 1993 (age 33) Busan, South Korea
- Listed height: 6 ft 4 in (1.93 m)
- Listed weight: 85 kg (187 lb)

Career information
- High school: Kyungbock High School
- College: Korea University
- KBL draft: 2015: 1st round, 1st overall pick
- Playing career: 2015–present

Career history
- 2015–2023: Anyang KGC
- 2017–2019: → Sangmu (military service)
- 2023–present: Suwon KT Sonicboom

Career highlights
- 3x KBL champion (2017, 2021, 2023); KBL regular season champion (2017); KBL Defensive Player of the Year (2020, 2021)
Medals
Representing South Korea
Men's basketball
FIBA Asia Cup
Bronze medal – third place	2013 Manila

- Korean name
- Hangul: 문성곤
- Hanja: 文星坤
- RR: Mun Seonggon
- MR: Mun Sŏnggon

Moon Seong-gon (born 9 May 1993) is a South Korean professional basketball player. He currently plays Suwon KT Sonicboom in the Korean Basketball League and the South Korean national team.

== Early life ==
A native of Busan, Moon began playing basketball in elementary school. He moved to Seoul for middle school and attended Kyungbock High School, one of Seoul's most notable basketball schools. While at Kyungbock, he and his juniors Choi Jun-yong and future Korea University teammate Lee Jong-hyun were dubbed the "Kyungbock Trio" by rival high school teams for their well-rounded offensive capabilities.

== Career ==
=== College ===
Moon played for Korea University, where he stood out for his shooting and defensive skills and earned his first call-up to the senior national team. During his senior year, he led the team to win a clean sweep of the U League regular season title, the championship title and the MBC Cup and was named U League regular season MVP.

=== Professional ===
Moon was the first overall pick of the 2015 KBL rookie draft and was drafted by Anyang KGC. Although one of the draft class's biggest prospects, there were doubts over whether he would be able to break into a squad which already consisted of established veterans such as Kim Tae-sul, Yang Hee-jong, Lee Jung-hyun and Oh Se-keun, all of whom have represented the national team and had been playing together as a team for several seasons already. He made his debut on 31 October 2015 against Seoul SK Knights and was mostly a substitute player, averaging around seven minutes per game the entire season. His second season was no different, although he played more games and Anyang KGC won both the regular season and the KBL Championship.

Frustrated with the lack of playing time, he enlisted for mandatory military service in May 2017 and was assigned to the Sangmu team after completing basic training. He was discharged in January 2019.

Since returning to Anyang KGC, Moon was given more playing time and became one of the mainstays of the team. Together with Yang, the duo gained a reputation as Anyang KGC's main defensive players, winning three KBL Defensive Player of the Year awards between them and being voted into the KBL Defensive Best 5 multiple times. Moon won the KBL Defensive Player of the Year for the first time in 2020, having averaged 2.1 steals per game and ranked first among domestic players.

During the 2020-21 season, Moon averaged 1.8 steals and 0.7 blocks per game. His defensive skills were notably highlighted in the play-off semi-finals against Busan KT Sonicboom, in which he and Yang were able to hold back a team which had some of the league's most prolific young offensive players. He won the KBL Defensive Player of the Year award for the second consecutive year.

=== National team ===
Moon participated in the 2011 FIBA Under-19 World Championship. He was first called up to the senior national team in 2013 by Yoo Jae-hak and made the final tournament squad for the FIBA Asia Championship that year. He has been called up to the national team on multiple occasions but never made the final 12-man squad for any major tournaments since the 2015 FIBA Asia Championship as Moon Tae-jong, Choi Jun-yong and Yang Hee-jong were preferred in the small forward position.

== Personal life ==
Moon is married to skating coach and retired figure skater Kwak Min-jeong. Kwak had met Moon by coincidence as she was based in Anyang as a coach. They made their relationship public in 2020 and married in May 2021.
