= KBL Defensive Player of the Year =

Annual Korean basketball award

The Korean Basketball League Defensive Player of the Year Award (Korean: 최우수수비상) is an annual Korean Basketball League (KBL) award given to the best defensive player during the regular season. The awardee is selected from players voted into the Defensive Best 5 (Korean: 수비 5걸) team. In addition to contributing to their team's overall defensive record, selected players must accumulate high averages in the following statistical categories: blocks, steals and defensive rebounds.

== Winners ==
^	Denotes player who is still active in the KBL
†	Denotes team which won the Championship that season
Player (X)	Denotes the number of times the player has been selected for the Defensive Best 5
**Player** **(in bold text)**	Indicates the player who won the Defensive Player of the Year Award

=== 1997 to 2009–10 ===
Season	Player	Position	Team
1997 (Note: Prior to the founding of the professional Korean Basketball League, the predecessor National Basketball Festival (농구대잔치) ended its final season in January 1997. The first season of the KBL began play in February 1997 to facilitate the transition. Since the 1997–98 season, the KBL season runs from October until April.)
1997	Lee Ji-sung	F	Daejeon Hyundai Dynat
1997	Jang Yoon-seob	F	Wonju Naray Blue Bird
1997	Kim Hyun-guk	F	Gwangju Nasan Flamans
1997	**Lee Hoon-jae**	F	Busan Kia Enterprise †
1997	Kim Byung-soo	F	Wonju Naray Blue Bird
1997–98
1997–98	Joo Hee-jung	G	Wonju Naray Blue Bird
1997–98	Park Kyu-hyun	G	Gyeongnam LG Sakers
1997–98	**Kim Young-man**	F	Busan Kia Enterprise
1997–98	Kim Hyun-guk (2)	F	Gwangju Nasan Flamans
1997–98	Park Jae-heon	C	Gyeongnam LG Sakers
1998–99
1998–99	Joo Hee-jung (2)	G	Suwon Samsung Thunders
1998–99	Stais Boseman	G	Incheon Daewoo Zeus
1998–99	**Choo Seung-gyun**	F	Daejeon Hyundai Gullivers †
1998–99	Lee Hoon-jae (2)	F	Daegu Tongyang Orions
1998–99	Park Jae-heon	C	Changwon LG Sakers
1999–00
1999–00	Joo Hee-jung (3)	G	Suwon Samsung Thunders
1999–00	Roderick Hannibal	G	Cheongju SK Knights †
1999–00	Choo Seung-gyun (2)	F	Daejeon Hyundai Gullivers
1999–00	**Yang Kyung-min**	F	Wonju Sambo Xers
1999–00	Lorenzo Hall	C	Daejeon Hyundai Gullivers

=== 2011–12 to 2013–14 ===
There were no Defensive Best 5 selections from the 2011–12 season until the 2013–14 season. During that time period, only the Defensive Player of the Year Award was awarded to one player.

Season	Player	Position	Team
2011–12	Kim Joo-sung	C/F	Wonju Dongbu Promy
2012–13	Yang Dong-geun	G	Ulsan Mobis Phoebus †
2013–14	Yang Hee-jong	F	Anyang KGC

=== 2014–15 to 2022–23 ===
Season	Player	Position	Team
2014–15
2014–15	**Yang Dong-geun** (2)	G	Ulsan Mobis Phoebus †
2014–15	Shin Myung-ho (2)	G	Jeonju KCC Egis
2014–15	Yang Hee-jong (2)	F	Anyang KGC
2014–15	Kim Joo-sung (5)	C/F	Wonju Dongbu Promy
2014–15	(United States) Ricardo Ratliffe^ (Note: Ratliffe became a naturalized South Korean citizen in 2018 and has gone by his Korean name "Ra Gun-ah" ever since.)	C/F	Ulsan Mobis Phoebus †
2015–16
2015–16	Yang Dong-geun (3)	G	Ulsan Mobis Phoebus
2015–16	Shin Myung-ho (3)	G	Jeonju KCC Egis
2015–16	**Lee Seoung-hyun**^	F	Goyang Orion Orions †
2015–16	Yang Hee-jong (3)	F	Anyang KGC
2015–16	(United States) Ricardo Ratliffe	C/F	Seoul Samsung Thunders
2016–17
2016–17	Park Chan-hee	G	Incheon Electroland Elephants
2016–17	Lee Jae-do^	G	Busan KT Sonicboom
2016–17	**Lee Seoung-hyun**^ (2)	F	Goyang Orion Orions
2016–17	Yang Hee-jong (4)	F	Anyang KGC †
2016–17	(United States) David Simon	C	Anyang KGC †
2017–18
2017–18	**Park Chan-hee** (2)	G	Incheon Electroland Elephants
2017–18	Lee Dae-sung	G	Ulsan Hyundai Mobis Phoebus
2017–18	Yang Hee-jong (5)	F	Anyang KGC
2017–18	Song Kyo-chang^	F	Jeonju KCC Egis
2017–18	Oh Se-keun^	C	Anyang KGC
2018–19
2018–19	**Park Chan-hee** (3)	G	Incheon Electroland Elephants
2018–19	Choi Won-hyuk^	G	Seoul SK Knights
2018–19	Yang Hee-jong (6)	F	Anyang KGC
2018–19	Yoon Ho-young^	F	Wonju DB Promy
2018–19	(United States) (South Korea) Ra Gun-ah (2)	C/F	Ulsan Hyundai Mobis Phoebus †
2019–20 (Note: Due to the COVID-19 pandemic, in March 2020, the KBL board of directors voted to end the season early, in the middle of the fifth round, and cancel the play-offs. Instead the KBL board of directors declared Wonju DB Promy and Seoul SK Knights as joint first place on the league table.)
2019–20	**Moon Seong-gon**^	F	Anyang KGC
2019–20	Lee Seoung-hyun^ (3)	F	Goyang Orion Orions
2019–20	Jang Jae-seok^	C	Ulsan Hyundai Mobis Phoebus
2019–20	Choi Sung-won^	G	Seoul SK Knights
2019–20	(United States) Chinanu Onuaku	C	Wonju DB Promy
2020–21
2020–21	**Moon Seong-gon**^ (2)	F	Anyang KGC †
2020–21	Lee Seoung-hyun^ (4)	F	Goyang Orion Orions
2020–21	Cha Ba-wee^	F	Incheon Electroland Elephants
2020–21	Choi Sung-won^ (2)	G	Seoul SK Knights
2020–21	Jang Jae-seok^ (2)	C	Ulsan Hyundai Mobis Phoebus
2021–22
2021–22	**Moon Seong-gon**^ (3)	F	Anyang KGC
2021–22	Jeong Sung-woo^	G	Suwon KT Sonicboom
2021–22	Lee Seoung-hyun^ (5)	F	Goyang Orion Orions
2021–22	Murphy Holloway	F	Daegu KOGAS Pegasus
2021–22	Cha Ba-wee^ (2)	F	Daegu KOGAS Pegasus
2022–23
2022–23	**Moon Seong-gon**^ (4)	F	Anyang KGC †
2022–23	Oh Jae-hyun^	G	Seoul SK Knights
2022–23	Kim Jin-yoo^	G	Goyang Dayone Jumpers
2022–23	Assem Marei	C	Changwon LG Sakers
2022–23	Ha Yoon-gi^	C	Suwon KT Sonicboom
2022–23	Kim Young-hyeon^	G	Ulsan Hyundai Mobis Phoebus

=== 2023–24 to present ===
The Defensive Best 5 was scrapped after the 2022–23 season. Beginning with the 2023–24 season, only one player is awarded the Defensive Player of the Year.

Season	Player	Position	Team
2023–24	Oh Jae-hyun^ (2)	G	Seoul SK Knights
2024–25	Jeong Sung-woo^ (2)	G	Daegu KOGAS Pegasus
2025–26	(Egypt) Assem Marei^ (2)	C	Assem Marei
