= Yoo Jae-hak =

South Korean basketball coach

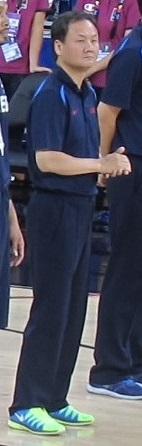

Personal information
- Born: March 20, 1963 (age 63)

Yoo Jae-hak (born 20 March 1963) is a South Korean basketball coach, formerly for Ulsan Mobis Phoebus and the Korean national team, which participated at the 2014 FIBA Basketball World Cup. He is currently Ulsan’s general manager. He also competed as a player in the men's tournament at the 1988 Summer Olympics.
