= Pak Hŭijung =

Korean diplomat (fl. 14th/15th centuries)

- Hangul: 박희중
- Hanja: 朴熙中
- RR: Bak Huijung
- MR: Pak Hŭijung

Pak Hŭijung (Korean: 박희중; Hanja: 朴熙中; 1364–?) was a scholar-official of the Joseon Dynasty Korea in 14th and 15th centuries.

He was also diplomat and ambassador, representing Joseon Dynasty interests in a diplomatic mission to the Ashikaga shogunate in Japan.

== 1423 mission to Japan ==
King Sejong dispatched a diplomatic mission to Japan in 1423. This embassy to court of Ashikaga Yoshinori was led by Pak Hŭijung.

The delegation from the Joseon court traveled to Kyoto in response to a message sent by the Japanese shogun; and also, the delegation was charged with conveying an offer to send a copy of a rare Buddhist text.

A diplomatic mission conventionally consisted of three primary figures—the main envoy, the vice-envoy, and a document official. Also included were one or more official writers or recorders who created a detailed account of the mission. In this instance, the vice-envoy was Yi Ye, who would return to Japan in 1432 as ambassador.

The Japanese hosts may have construed these mission as tending to confirm a Japanocentric world order. The Joseon diplomats were more narrowly focused in negotiating protocols for Joseon-Japan diplomatic relations.

== Recognition in the West ==
Pak Hŭijung's historical significance was confirmed when his mission was specifically mentioned in a widely distributed history published by the Oriental Translation Fund in 1834.

In the West, early published accounts of the Joseon kingdom are not extensive, but they are found in Sangoku Tsūran Zusetsu (published in Paris in 1832), and in Nihon ōdai ichiran (published in Paris in 1834). Joseon foreign relations and diplomacy are explicitly referenced in the 1834 work.

== See also ==
- Joseon diplomacy
- Joseon missions to Japan
- Joseon tongsinsa
