= Hong Gye-hui =

Joseon scholar-official (1703–1771)

- Hangul: 홍계희
- Hanja: 洪啓禧
- RR: Hong Gyehui
- MR: Hong Kyehŭi

Hong Gye-hui (Korean: 홍계희; 1703–1771) was a Korean scholar-official of the Joseon period in the 18th century.

He was also diplomat and ambassador, representing Joseon interests in the 10th Edo period diplomatic mission to the Tokugawa shogunate in Japan.

== 1748 mission to Japan ==
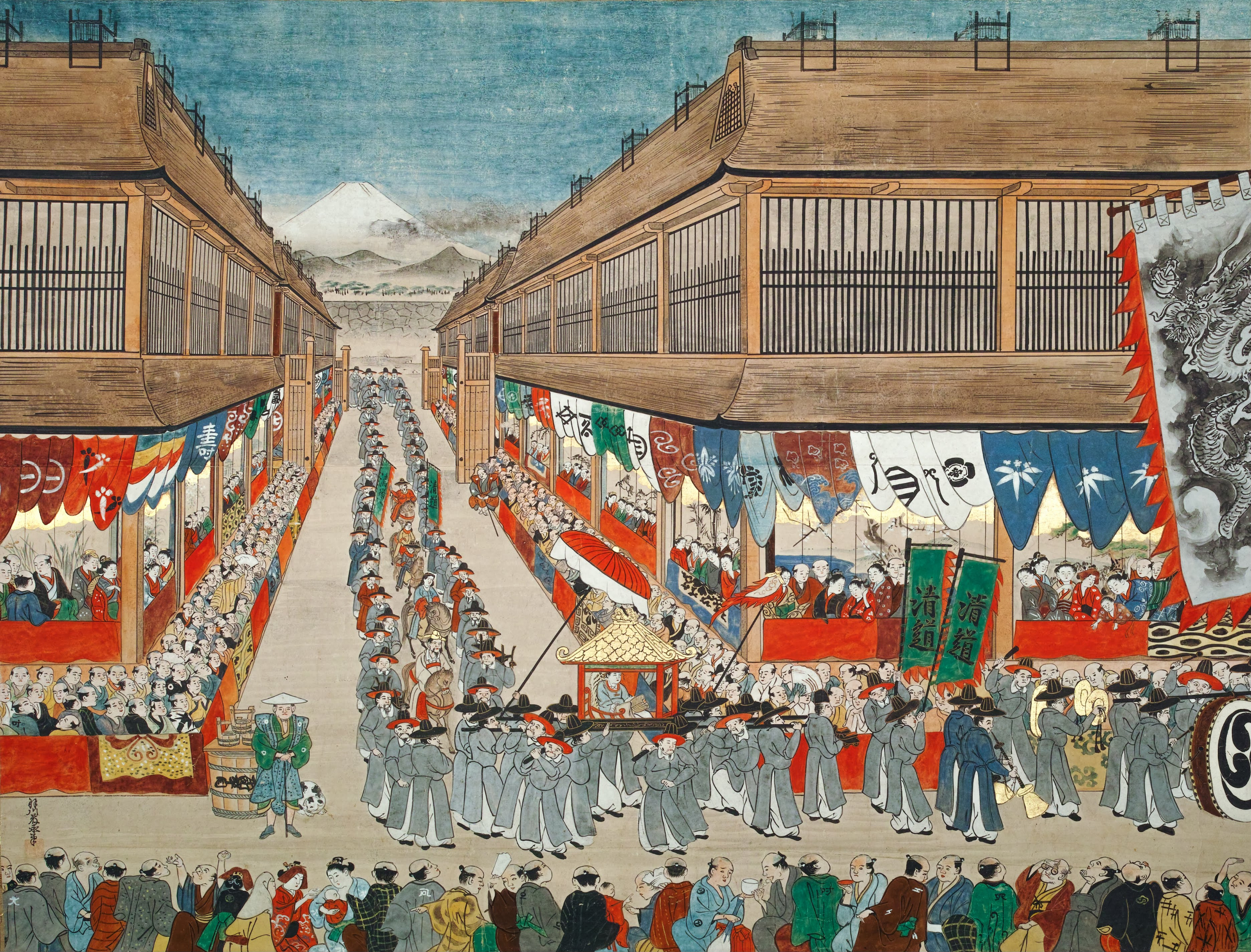
This image of a Joseon tongsinsa procession through the streets of Edo in 1748 is entitled Chosenjin Ukie by Hanegawa Tōei, c. 1748.

In 1748, King Yeongjo of Joseon directed that a diplomatic mission to Japan would be dispatched. This diplomatic mission functioned to the advantage of both the Japanese and the Koreans as a channel for developing a political foundation for trade.

This delegation was explicitly identified by the Joseon court as a "Communication Envoy" (tongsinsa). The mission was understood to signify that relations were "normalized."

This embassy traveled to Edo in the 1st year of the Japanese era of Kan'en, according to the Japanese calendar in use at that time. The chief envoy of this Joseon delegation was Hong Gye-hui.

== Recognition in the West ==
Pak Tong-chi's historical significance was confirmed when his mission and his name were specifically mentioned in a widely distributed history published by the Oriental Translation Fund in 1834.

In the West, early published accounts of the Joseon kingdom are not extensive, but they are found in Sangoku Tsūran Zusetsu (published in Paris in 1832), and in Nihon ōdai ichiran (published in Paris in 1834). Joseon foreign relations and diplomacy are explicitly referenced in the 1834 work.

== Popular culture ==
- Portrayed by Jang Hyun-sung in the 2014 SBS TV series Secret Door.

== See also ==
- Joseon diplomacy
- Joseon missions to Japan
- Joseon tongsinsa

== Notes ==
Preceded by Hong Chi-jung	Joseon–Japanese; Edo period diplomacy 10th mission 1748	Succeeded by Jo Eom
