= Kim Myŏngguk =

Korean painter (1600–1662)

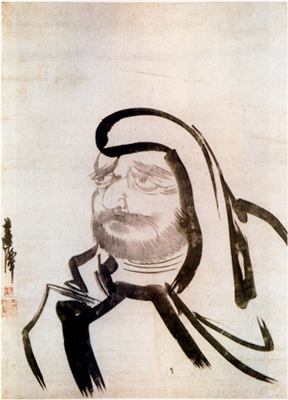
- Dalmado by Kim Myŏngguk

Korean name
- Hangul: 김명국
- Hanja: 金明國
- RR: Gim Myeongguk
- MR: Kim Myŏngguk

Art name
- Hangul: 연담, 취옹
- Hanja: 蓮潭, 醉翁
- RR: Yeondam, Chwiong
- MR: Yŏndam, Ch'wiong

Courtesy name
- Hangul: 천여
- Hanja: 天汝
- RR: Cheonyeo
- MR: Ch'ŏnyŏ

Kim Myŏngguk (Korean: 김명국; Hanja: 金明國, 1600 – after 1662), also known as Kim Myeong-guk, was a painter of the mid Joseon period of Korea.

== Biography ==
Kim Myŏngguk was born in 1600. He entered the royal service as a member of the Dohwaseo, the official painters of the Joseon court.

Quite immediately, Kim Myŏngguk appeared as a new type of artist, clearly distinctive from his contemporaries, who more or less worked as craftsmen that faithfully replicated mainstream styles. A diplomatic statement is "he was known to have an artistic personality that was characterized by individualism and obstinacy", while an understatement would be "his contemporaries described him as a carefree drunkard, a characterization that corresponds to the Chinese image of the eccentric artist".

Nevertheless, (or precisely for this reason), Kim Myŏngguk has been in charge of many official artistic tasks. He was member of both the large-scale tongsinsa send to Japan by King Injo (1595–1623–1649). The 1636 delegation was led by Im Gwang (1579–1644), while the 1643 delegation was led by Yun Sunji (1591–1666). "According to one account, Kim became distraught with exhaustion because an endless stream of Japanese enthusiasts, eager to purchase his works, would not allow him a moment of peace". Dalmado (cf infra) was painted during his second trip to Japan.

In 1647, he directed a team of 6 senior painters (화원) and 66 other people to repair the Changgyeong Palace. Later he was in charge of portraits of meritorious subjects. The circumstances and the year of his death are unknown. His last known painting (Sasipalgyeongdo) dates back to 1662.

== Gallery ==
Although retained as a court painter, Kim was also a pioneering artist who insisted on creating works that were true to his personality and sentiments.

Most of the Kim Myŏngguk paintings involving people have Buddhist themes (and a specific artistic style). His art name Yeondam ("Lotus pond") has Buddhist connotations. Yi Saek was the scholar official that opposed the overthrowing of Buddhism at the foundation of the Joseon Kingdom.

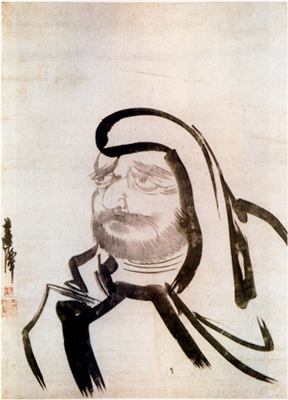
Dalmado (Bodhidharma)

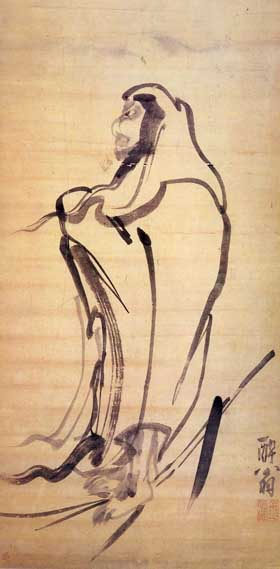
Dalma jeolro gang
달마절로도강
Bodhidharma crossing a river with a broken branch

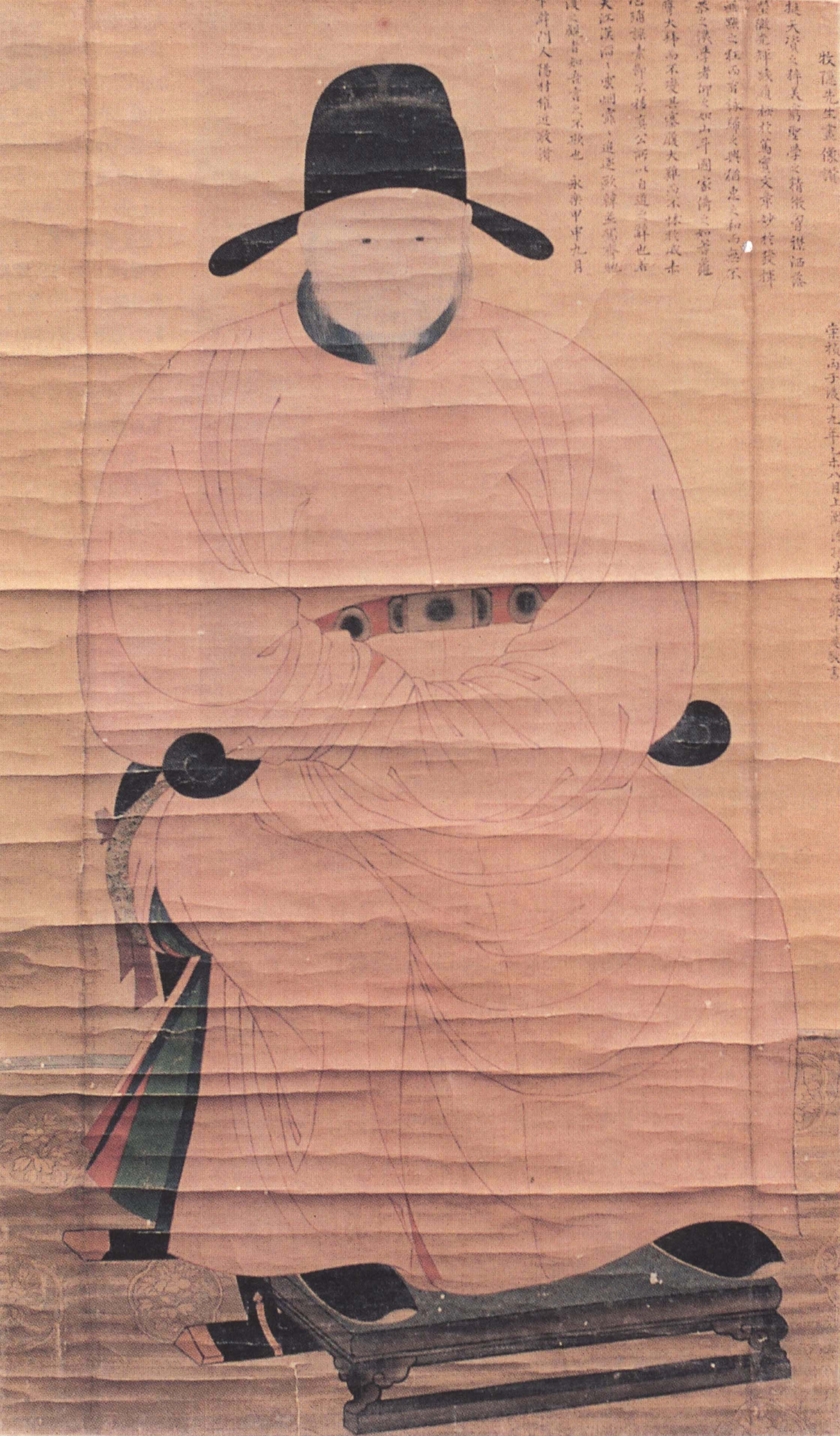
이색초상
Portrait of Yi Saek
1654
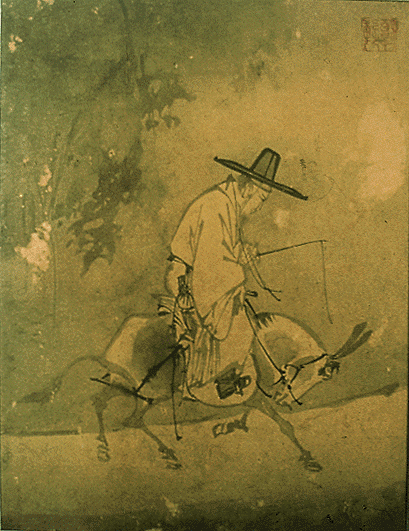
Giryeodo 기려도
Going on horseback
1650

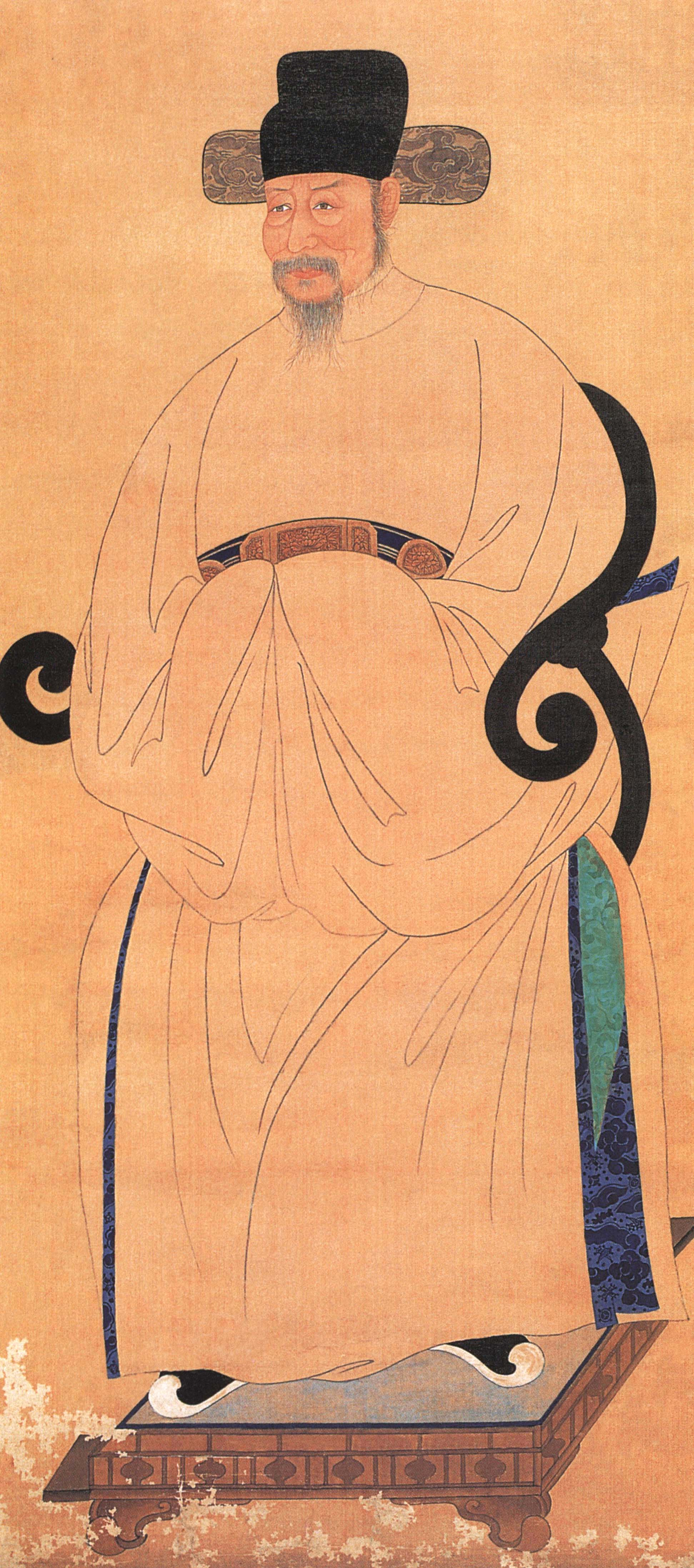
이상길초상
Portrait of Yi Sang-kil
1657?

His landscape paintings are more 'mainstream', but nevertheless specific.

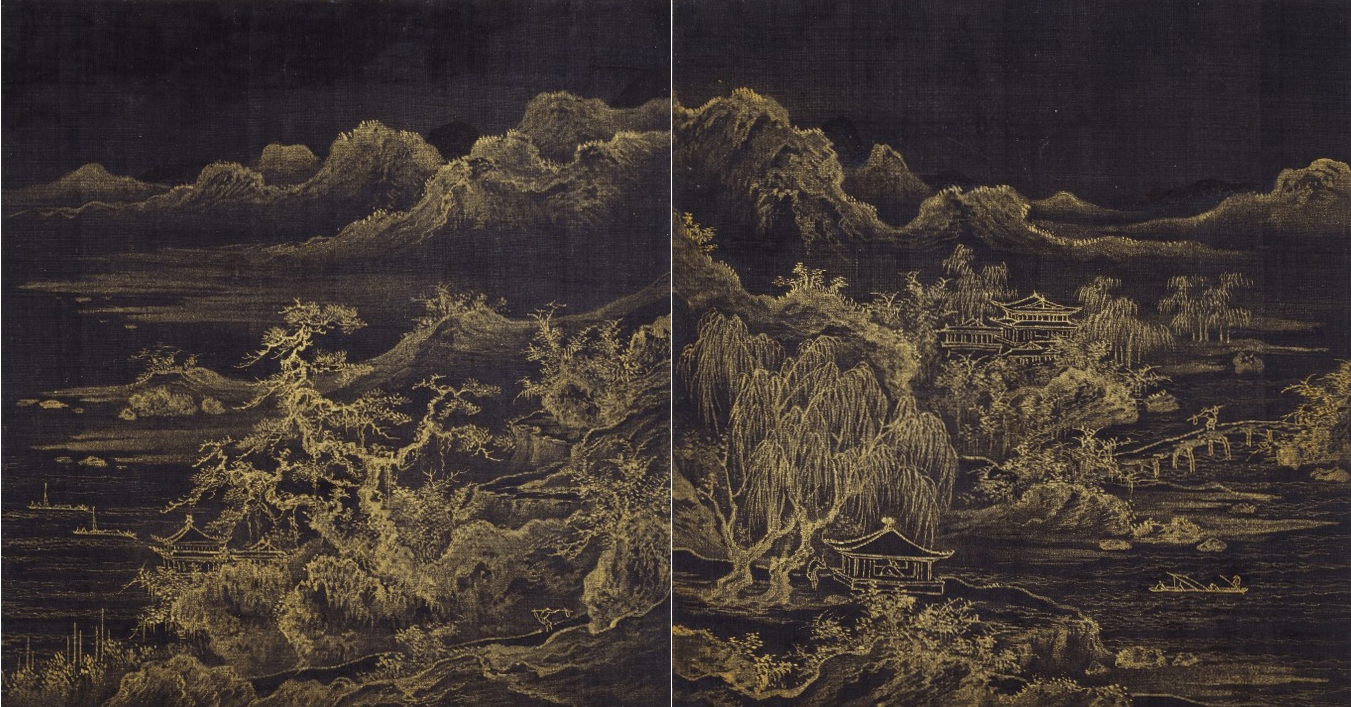
초춘/만춘 early and late spring

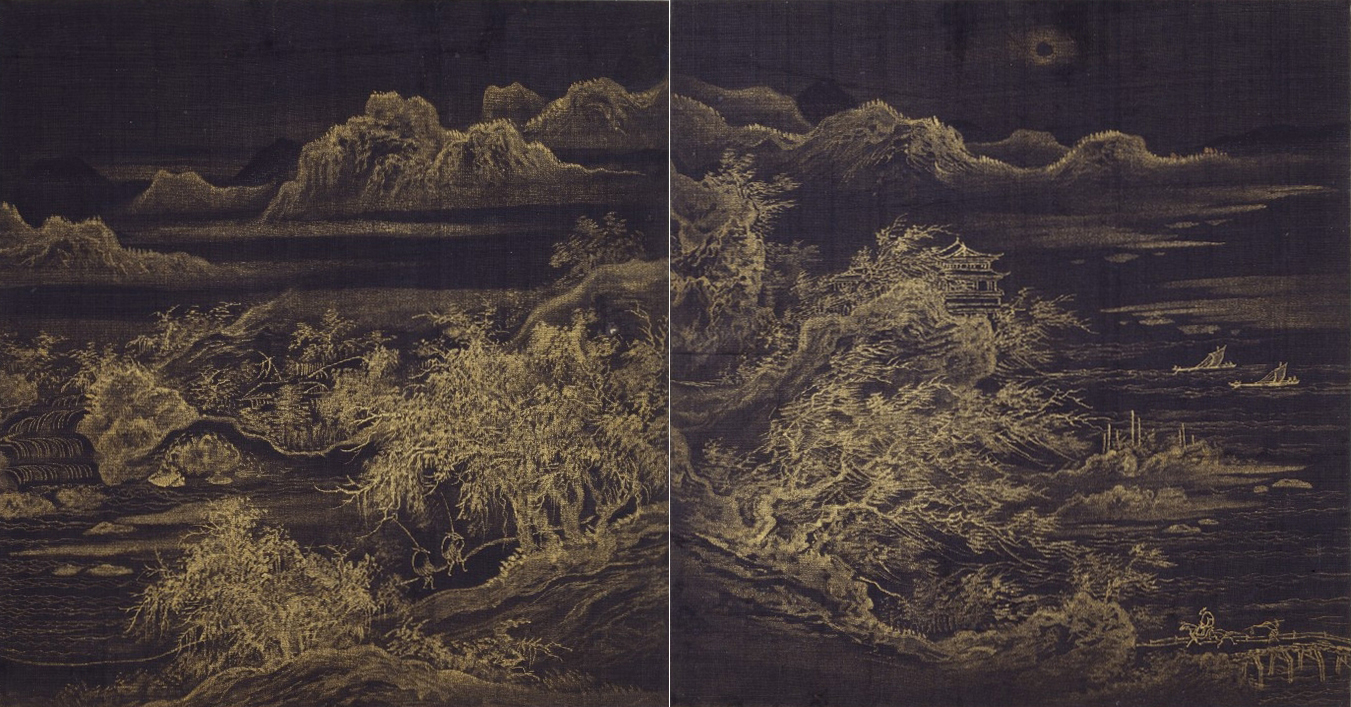
초하/만하 early and late summer

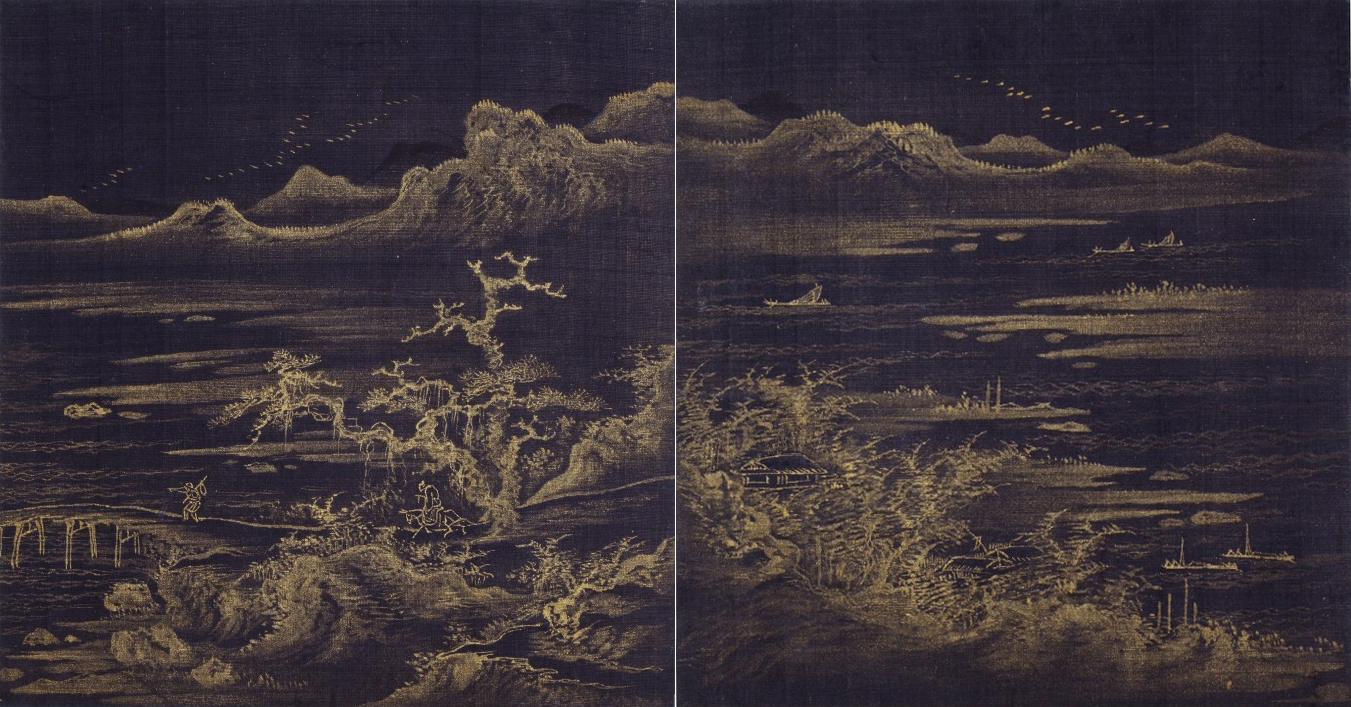
초추/만추 early and late autumn

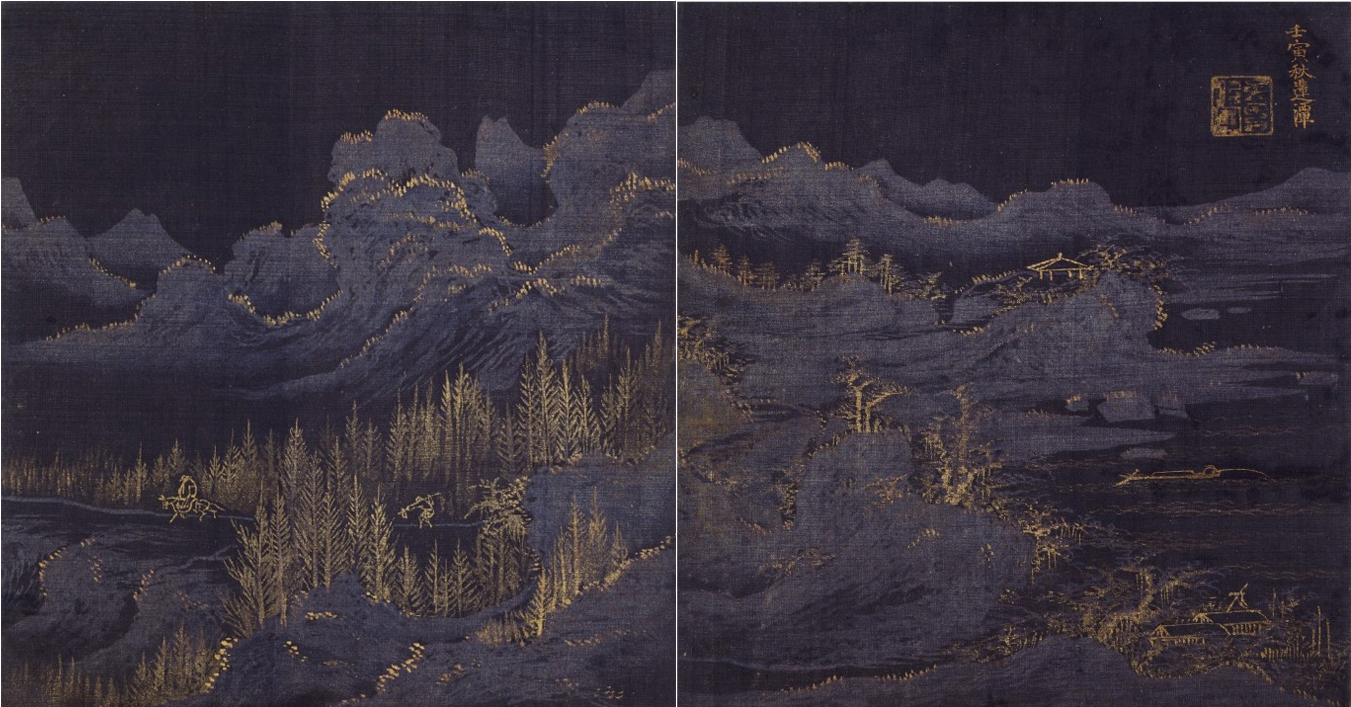
>초동/만동 early and late winter

사시팔경도 - Eight views of the Four Seasons (1662)

The Korean Copyright Commission lists 24 paintings for Kim Myŏngguk, while Towooart gives a short notice.

== See also ==
- Korean painting
- List of Korean painters
- Korean art

== Bibliography ==
- Turner, Jane (2003). Grove Dictionary of Art. Oxford University Press, USA. p. 32600. ISBN 978-0-1951-7068-9.
- KCC (2013). "Kim Myeong-guk". Database (in Korean). Korean Copyright Commission.
- TWA (2013). "Kim Myeong-guk". Database (in Korean). Towooart.
