= Pak Tonji =

Korean scholar-bureaucrat (1342–1422)

- Hangul: 박돈지
- Hanja: 朴惇之
- RR: Bak Donji
- MR: Pak Tonji

Courtesy name
- Hangul: 계신
- Hanja: 季信
- RR: Gyesin
- MR: Kyesin

Childhood name
- Hangul: 박계양
- Hanja: 朴啓陽
- RR: Bak Gyeyang
- MR: Pak Kyeyang

Pak Tonji (Korean: 박돈지; Hanja: 朴惇之; July 3, 1342 – September 17, 1422 (Note: In the Korean calendar (lunar), he was born on the 6th day of 1st lunar month 1342 and died on the 2nd day of the 9th lunar month 1422 at the age of 81.)) was a Korean scholar-bureaucrat, diplomat, and ambassador, representing Joseon interests in the tongsinsa (diplomatic mission) to the Ashikaga shogunate (Muromachi bakufu) in Japan. He lived from the late Goryeo until the early Joseon periods.

== Early life ==
Pak Tonji was born in 1342 in Kŏnch'ŏn-ri, Gaegyeong, the capital of Goryeo. A member of the Miryang Pak clan, he was the son of Pak Yun-mun and Lady Kim, the second daughter of Kim T'aehyŏn. On December 3, 1360, he passed the civil service examination, ranking eighth overall (Note: In the Korean calendar (lunar), the 25th day of the 10th lunar month.).

== 1398 mission to Japan ==
King Taejo dispatched a diplomatic mission to Japan in 1398–1399. Pak led the embassy to the shogunal court of Ashikaga Yoshimochi. The envoy was charged with conveying a response to a message from the Japanese shōgun and seeking Ashikaga involvement in suppressing pirate raiders believed to come from Japan. These pirates were variously known as wokou (Chinese character: 倭寇; Chinese pronunciation: wōkòu; Japanese pronunciation: wakō; Korean pronunciation: 왜구 waegu).

Pak and his retinue arrived in Kyoto in the early autumn of 1398 (Ōei 5, 8th month). Shōgun Ashikaga Yoshimochi presented the envoy with a formal diplomatic letter; and presents were given for the envoy to convey to the Joseon court. When Pak returned from Japan in 1399, he brought with him more than 100 wakō captives, an explicit earnest of good faith.

Pak also bore letters from the Ashikaga shōgun requesting original texts of Buddhist scriptures and Buddhist altar fittings.

Pak conveyed the following letter from Shōgun Yoshimitsu to the governor of Kyushu:

"This instruction is hereby given to you, Ōuchi Sakyo-no-Tayu (Ōuchi Yoshihiro). The Korean envoy, in compliance with the command of his government, came to our country, crossing waters of vast expanse. He brought us a gift of great value from his nation, thus showing us great courtesy. We have highly appreciated this. Now that this envoy is returning to his country, we should send products of our land in recognition of this gift and as a token of our good will.

"You are also instructed to inform the Korean envoy that all the pirates and persons of the unruly class in Kyushu have been arrested and punished in accordance with the provisions of our laws, and that we are sending troops under the convoy of our fleet to various far-off islands with the purpose of annihilating all the remaining pirate bands. Therefore, from this time on, all ships coming from and returning to Korea will be safeguarded. Thus will the friendship of the two nations be maintained.

"For several years past, we have made many earnest attempts to publish the Daizōkyō, a standard Buddhistic sutra, but have not yet succeeded. According to our understanding, Korea has an excellent edition of this sutra. We would therefore ask that Korea meet our long-felt need by sending us a complete set of this edition. If Korea should grant this request, the propagation of Buddhism toward the East would be materially advanced. We also desire to have a large Buddhistic church bell made of copper, and we also wish to secure good medicinal herbs from Korea. The Buddhistic sutras and accessories are needed in our country in order to save our people from suffering in a future existence. The medicinal herbs will enable our people to enjoy health and longevity in this present world. Korea possesses them in great abundance.

"You are imperatively instructed to convey these desires to the Korean envoy and to impress him with our great need of and desire for them, in order that we may not fail to obtain them."

The Japanese hosts may have construed this mission as tending to confirm a Japan-centric world order. Pak's words and actions were more narrowly focused in negotiating protocols for Joseon–Japan diplomatic relations.

== Recognition in the West ==
Pak's historical significance was confirmed when his mission was specifically mentioned in a widely distributed history published by the Oriental Translation Fund in 1834.

In the West, early published accounts of the Joseon kingdom are not extensive, but they are found in Sangoku Tsūran Zusetsu (published in Paris in 1832), and in Nihon ōdai ichiran (published in Paris in 1834). Joseon foreign relations and diplomacy are explicitly referenced in the 1834 work.

== Family ==
Pak Tonji was the son of Pak Yun-mun and Lady Kim. He married the daughter of Hong Man-ryong of the Namyang Hong clan. Together, they had a son, Pak Sa-je, and two daughters. Their first daughter married Yi Ŭi-san, while their second married Chŏng Kyŏng.

== See also ==
- Joseon diplomacy
- Joseon missions to Japan
- Joseon tongsinsa
