= Jo Hyeong =

Joseon scholar-official (1606–1679)

- Hangul: 조형
- Hanja: 趙珩
- RR: Jo Hyeong
- MR: Cho Hyŏng

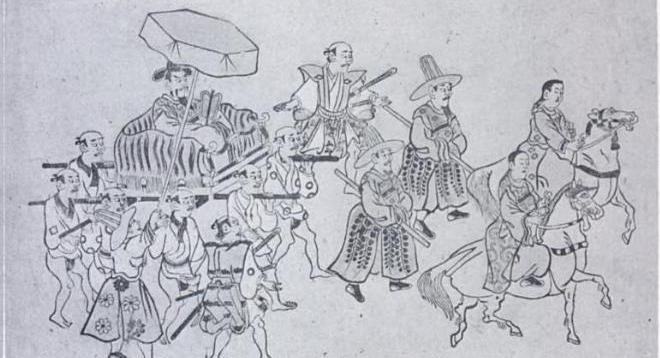
In this grand procession, Jo Hyeong is carried in a chaise lined with a tiger skin. This contemporary impression of the Joseon envoy and his retinue during the 1655 Joseon diplomatic mission to Japan is attributed to Hishikawa Moronobu (1618–1694).

Jo Hyeong (Korean: 조형; Hanja: 趙珩; 1606–1679) was a Korean scholar-official of the Joseon period, in the 17th century.

He was also a diplomat and ambassador, representing Joseon interests in the 6th Edo period diplomatic mission to the Tokugawa shogunate in Japan. Through his children's marriages, his family eventually gained royal connections.

== 1655 mission to Japan ==
In 1655 King Hyojong of Joseon sent a mission to the shogunal court of Tokugawa Ietsuna. This diplomatic mission functioned to the advantage of both the Japanese and the Koreans as a channel for developing a political foundation for trade.

The delegation was explicitly identified by the Joseon court as a "Communication Envoy" (tongsinsa). The mission was understood to signify that relations were "normalized".

The mission arrived in Japan during the 1st year of Meireki according to in the Japanese calendar in use at that time. Jo Hyeong was the chief envoy of the Joseon embassy which was received in the shogunate court at Edo from where the delegation were taken in a procession to the Tōshō-gū at Nikkō.

== Recognition in the West ==
Jo Hyeong's historical significance was confirmed when his mission and his name were specifically mentioned in a widely distributed history published by the Oriental Translation Fund in 1834.

In western culture early published accounts of the Joseon kingdom are not extensive but they are found in Sangoku Tsūran Zusetsu (published in Paris in 1832) and in Nihon ōdai ichiran (published in Paris in 1834). Joseon foreign relations and diplomacy are explicitly referenced in the 1834 work.

The term "Joseon Dynasty" is equivalent to "Joseon kingdom" and it is a preferred usage in the 21st century.

== Family ==
- Father
  - Jo Hui-bo (조희보; 趙希輔)
- Mother
  - Biological - Lady Choi of the Gangneung Choi clan (증 정경부인 강릉 최씨); daughter of Choi Mun (최문; 崔文), second wife
  - Step - Lady No of the Gyoha No clan (증 정부인 교하 노씨); daughter of No Jik (노직; 盧稙)
- Sibling(s)
  - Brother - Jo Min (조민; 趙珉)
- Wife
  - Lady Mok of the Sacheon Mok clan (정경부인 사천 목씨)
- Issue
  - Son - Jo Sang-byeon (조상변; 趙相抃)
  - Daughter - Lady Jo of the Pungyang Jo clan (풍양 조씨; 豐壤 趙氏)
  - Son - Jo Sang-jeong (조상정; 趙相鼎); became the adoptive son of his uncle Jo Min (조민; 趙珉)
  - Son - Jo Sang-gi (조상기; 趙相槩)
  - Daughter - Lady Jo of the Pungyang Jo clan (풍양 조씨; 豐壤 趙氏)
  - Daughter - Lady Jo of the Pungyang Jo clan (풍양 조씨; 豐壤 趙氏)
  - Son - Jo Sang-woo (조상우; 趙相愚; 1640–1718)

== See also ==
- Joseon diplomacy
- Joseon missions to Japan
- Joseon tongsinsa

| Preceded by Yun Sunji | Joseon–Japanese; Edo period diplomacy 6th mission 1655 | Succeeded by Yun Jiwan |
