= Yŏ Ŭison =

Korean politician (fl. 15th century)

- Hangul: 여의손
- Hanja: 呂義孫
- RR: Yeo Uison
- MR: Yŏ Ŭison

Yŏ Ŭison (Korean: 여의손; Hanja: 呂義孫; fl. 15th century) was a Korean civil minister (munsin) and diplomat from the Hamyang Yŏ clan during the early Joseon period. Yŏ served as the first governor (moksa) of Jeju Island and a Jeonseo (minister). He also was sent to Japan as a diplomat representing Joseon.

== Biography ==
On October 25, 1403, the fourth year of Taejong's reign, Yŏ Ŭison was dispatched to Japan as a return courtesy to an earlier Japanese diplomatic mission to Korea sent from the Japanese shogun, Ashikaga Yoshimochi in the same year. He was a Joseonseo (典書), the predecessor of Panseo, or, minister of Yukjo, the Six Ministries.

On February 27, 1406, however, the king banished Yŏ to Jindo island for his remissness in the discharge of his duty as a diplomat. When Yŏ Ŭison arrived in Japan, a diplomat from Ming China also visited there. His interpreter, Hwang Gi (黃奇) was fluent in both Chinese and Japanese language, so the Ming diplomat took off Hwang to China. In addition, Yŏ did not submit a report regarding the news to the king that Ming informed Japan of the intention to assault Joseon, but spread it in private. The Office of Inspector-General called Saheonbu accused Yŏ of the negligence of the mission.

== See also ==
- Joseon diplomacy
- Joseon missions to Japan
- Joseon Tongsinsa
