= Joseon diplomacy =

Relations of the 1392–1910 Korean state

Joseon diplomacy was the foreign policy of the Joseon dynasty of Korea from 1392 through 1910; and its theoretical and functional foundations were rooted in Neo-Confucian scholar-bureaucrats, institutions and philosophy.

Taejo of Joseon established the "Kingdom of Great Joseon" in 1392–1393, and he founded the Joseon dynasty which would retain power on the Korean peninsula for five hundred years. As an initial step, a diplomatic mission was dispatched to China and to Japan in 1402. Subsequent missions developed and nurtured the contacts and exchanges between these neighboring countries.

A diplomatic mission conventionally consisted of three envoys—the main envoy, the vice-envoy, and a document official. Also included were one or more official writers or recorders who created a detailed account of the mission.

In the 20th century, the Joseon dynasty's bilateral relations were affected by the increasing numbers of international contacts which required adaptation and a new kind of diplomacy.

== Diplomacy with China ==
Although the Joseon dynasty considered 1392 as the foundation of the Joseon kingdom, Imperial China did not immediately acknowledge the new government on the Korean peninsula. In 1401, the Ming court recognized Joseon as a tributary state in its sino-centric schema of foreign relations. In 1403, the Yongle Emperor conveyed a patent and a gold seal to Taejong of Joseon, thus confirming his status and that of his dynasty.

An early achievement of the new monarch was improved relations with China; Joseon had its origin in General Yi's refusal to attack China in response to raids from Chinese bandits.

== Diplomacy with Japan ==
As an initial step, a diplomatic mission was dispatched to Japan in 1402. The Joseon envoy sought to bring about the re-establishment of amicable relations between the two countries and he was charged to commemorate the good relations which existed in ancient times. This mission was successful, and shōgun Ashikaga Yoshimitsu was reported to have been favorably impressed by this initial embassy. Not less than 70 diplomatic missions were dispatched from the Joseon capital to Japan before the beginning of Japan's Edo period.

Reciprocal missions were construed as a means of communication between Korean kings and Japanese shōguns of almost equal ranking. The emperors of Japan at the time were figureheads with no actual political or military power; Joseon actually communicated with the real political and military rulers of Japan, the shoguns, who were entitled "Taikun of Japan" in many foreign communications. This avoided conflict with the Sinocentric world order, in which the emperor of China was the highest authority, and all rulers of tributary states were known as "kings".

== Gyorin diplomacy with other nations ==
The Joseon dynasty employed the gyorin (kyorin) (neighborly relations) diplomacy in dealings with Jurchen, Japan, Ryukyu Kingdom, Siam and Java. Gyorin was applied to a multi-national foreign policy. The unique nature of these bilateral diplomatic exchanges evolved from a conceptual framework developed by the Chinese. Gradually, the theoretical models would be modified, mirroring the evolution of a unique relationship.

== List of Joseon diplomatic envoys ==
- Pak Ton-ji
- Yŏ Ŭison
- Yun Myŏng
- Yang Su (diplomat)
- Bak Bun
- Song Hŭigyŏng
- Pak Hŭi-chung
- Pak An-sin
- Pak Sŏ-saeng
- Yi Ye
- Ko Tŭkchong
- Pyŏn Hyomun
- Hwang Yun-gil
- Hwang Sin
- Samyeongdang (Yu jeong)
- Yeo U-gil (Yŏ Ugil)
- O Yun-gyeom (O Yun'gyŏm)
- Jeong Rip (Chŏng Ip)
- Im Gwang (Im Kwang)
- Yun Sunji
- Jo Hyeong (Cho Hyŏng)
- Yun Chiwan
- Jo Tae-eok (Cho T'aeŏk)
- Hong Chi-jung (Hong Ch'ijung)
- Hong Gye-hui (Hong Kyehŭi)
- Jo Eom (Cho Ŏm)
- Kim Igyo

=== Recognition in the West ===
The historical significance of some of these scholar-bureaucrats were confirmed when their missions and their names were specifically mentioned in a widely distributed history published by the Oriental Translation Fund in 1834.

In the West, early published accounts of the Joseon kingdom are not extensive, but they are found in Sangoku Tsūran Zusetsu (published in Paris in 1832), and in Nihon Ōdai Ichiran (published in Paris in 1834). Joseon foreign relations and diplomacy are explicitly referenced in the 1834 work; and some of the diplomats names are also identified.

== See also ==
- Goryeo missions to Imperial China
- Joseon missions to Japan
- Joseon tongsinsa
- Japan-Korea Treaty of 1876 (Treaty of Ganghwa)
- Korean Empire
- Pyŏgwisinp'yŏn
