= Hong Chi-jung =

Korean scholar-official (1667–1732)

Hong Chi-jung 홍치중

Chief State Councillor
- In office 1 July 1729 – 13 August 1732
- Preceded by: Yi Gwang-jwa
- Succeeded by: Sim Su-hyeon

Left State Councillor
- In office 16 July 1728 – 1 July 1729
- Preceded by: Jo Tae-eok
- Succeeded by: Yi Tae-jwa
- In office 12 June 1726 – 17 August 1727
- Preceded by: Yi Gwang-myeong
- Succeeded by: Jo Tae-eok

Right State Councillor
- In office 17 August 1727 – 1727
- Preceded by: Yi Ui-hyeon
- Succeeded by: Sim Su-hyeon
- In office 18 February 1725 – 1725
- Preceded by: Yi Gwang-myeong
- Succeeded by: Jo Do-bin

Personal details
- Born: 1667
- Died: 1732 (aged 64–65)

Korean name
- Hangul: 홍치중
- Hanja: 洪致中
- RR: Hong Chijung
- MR: Hong Ch'ijung

Hong Chi-jung (1667–1732) was a scholar-official and Prime Minister of the Joseon Dynasty Korea in the 18th century from 1729 to 1732.

He was also diplomat and ambassador, representing Joseon interests in the 9th Edo period diplomatic mission to the Tokugawa shogunate in Japan.

== 1719 mission to Japan ==
In 1719, King Sukjong dispatched a diplomatic mission to the shogunal court of Tokugawa Yoshimune. This diplomatic mission functioned to the advantage of both the Japanese and the Koreans as a channel for developing a political foundation for trade.

This delegation was explicitly identified by the Joseon court as a "Communication Envoy" (tongsinsa). The mission was understood to signify that relations were "normalized."

The Joseon embassy arrived in Kyoto on the 10th month of the 4th year of Kyōhō, according to the Japanese calendar in use at that time. Hong Chi-jung was the chief envoy.

== Recognition in the West ==
Pak Tong-chi's historical significance was confirmed when his mission and his name was specifically mentioned in a widely distributed history published by the Oriental Translation Fund in 1834.

In the West, early published accounts of the Joseon kingdom are not extensive, but they are found in Sangoku Tsūran Zusetsu (published in Paris in 1832), and in Nihon ōdai ichiran (published in Paris in 1834). Joseon foreign relations and diplomacy are explicitly referenced in the 1834 work.

== See also ==
- Yeonguijeong
- Joseon diplomacy
- Joseon missions to Japan
- Joseon tongsinsa

== Notes ==
Preceded by Jo Tae-eok	Joseon–Japanese; Edo period diplomacy 9th mission 1719	Succeeded by Hong Gye-hui
