= Pyŏn Hyomun =

- Hangul: 변효문
- Hanja: 卞孝文
- RR: Byeon Hyomun
- MR: Pyŏn Hyomun

Pyŏn Hyomun (1396–?) was a Korean civil minister (munsin) from the Chogye Pyŏn clan during the early period of Korean Joseon Dynasty. He briefly served as a diplomat and an ambassador, representing Joseon interests in the Tongsinsa (diplomatic mission) to the Ashikaga shogunate (Muromachi bafuku) in Japan.

== 1443 mission to Japan ==
King Sejong dispatched a diplomatic mission to Japan in 1443, which was the 25th year of King Sejong's rule. This embassy to court of Ashikaga Yoshimasa in Kamakura was led by Pyŏn Hyomun. Its purpose was to offer condolences on the death of Ashikaga Yoshinori and congratulations on the accession of Ashikaga Yoshikatsu. The Japanese hosts may have construed this mission as tending to confirm a Japanocentric world order. Pyŏn Hyomun's actions were more narrowly focused in negotiating protocols for Joseon-Japan diplomatic relations.

Korean diplomatic efforts produced an agreement in 1443, also called the "Kakitsu treaty" after the Japanese era name (nengō) which identify the years 1441 through 1444. The agreement regularized an initial plan for mitigating the damage caused by pirates. The bilateral agreement assigned the responsibility for monitoring ships from Japan en route to Korea. The Sō clan of Tsushima han (Tsushima Island) were given the right to license ships sailing west beyond Tsushima; and this also encompassed the opportunity to profit from whatever fees the Sō might charge.

== Recognition in the West ==
PyŏnHyo-mun's historical significance was confirmed when his mission was specifically mentioned in a widely distributed history published by the Oriental Translation Fund in 1834.

In the West, early published accounts of the Joseon kingdom are not extensive, but they are found in Sangoku Tsūran Zusetsu (published in Paris in 1832), and in Nihon ōdai ichiran (published in Paris in 1834). Joseon foreign relations and diplomacy are explicitly referenced in the 1834 work.

== See also ==
- Joseon diplomacy
- Joseon missions to Japan
- Joseon tongsinsa
