= Jo Tae-eok =

Korean scholar-official (1675–1728)

Jo Tae-eok 조태억
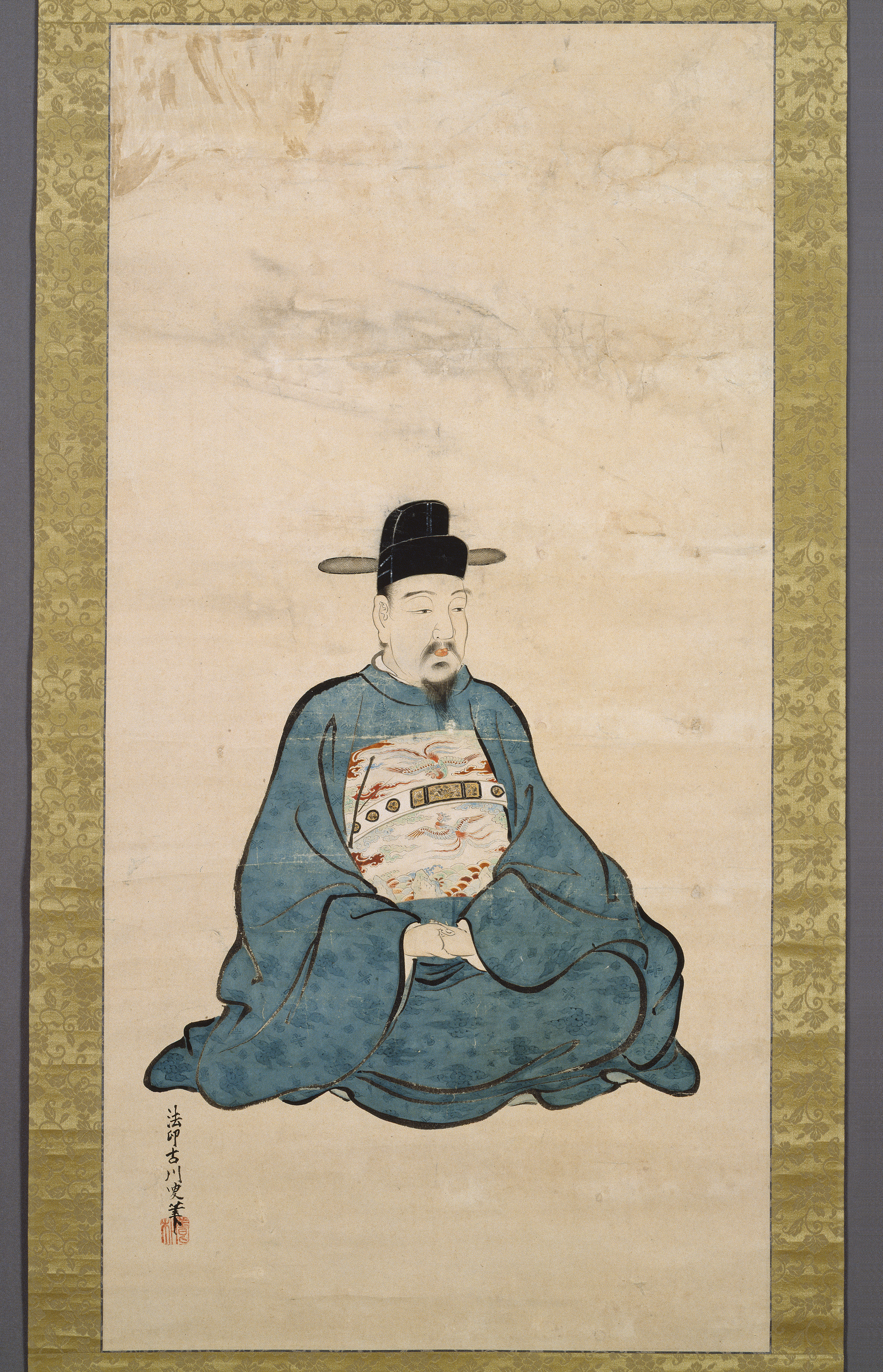
- Portrait of Jo Tae-eok

Left State Councillor
- In office 17 August 1727 – 7 July 1728
- Preceded by: Hong Chi-jung
- Succeeded by: Hong Chi-jung
- In office 13 March 1725 – 8 April 1725
- Preceded by: Ryu Bong-hwi
- Succeeded by: Jeong Ho

Right State Councillor
- In office 18 November 1724 – March 1725
- Preceded by: Ryu Bong-hwi
- Succeeded by: Jeong Ho

Personal details
- Born: 1675
- Died: 5 November 1728 (aged 52–53)

Korean name
- Hangul: 조태억
- Hanja: 趙泰億
- RR: Jo Taeeok
- MR: Cho T'aeŏk

Jo Tae-eok (Korean: 조태억; 1675 – 5 November 1728), also known as Cho T'aeŏk, was an 18th-century Korean scholar-official and Jwauijeong of the Joseon period.

He was also diplomat and ambassador, representing Joseon interests in the 8th Edo period diplomatic mission to the Tokugawa shogunate in Japan.

== 1711 mission to Japan ==
In 1711, King Sukjong of Joseon directed that a mission to the shogunal court of Tokugawa Ienobu should be sent to Edo. This diplomatic mission functioned to the advantage of both the Japanese and the Koreans as a channel for developing a political foundation for trade.

This delegation was explicitly identified by the Joseon court as a "Communication Envoy" (tongsinsa). The mission was understood to signify that relations were "normalized."

The delegation arrived in the 1st year of Shōtoku, according to the Japanese calendar in use at that time. Jo Tae-eok was the chief envoy of this diplomatic embassy.

== Recognition in the West ==
Jo Tae-eok's historical significance was confirmed when his mission and his name were specifically mentioned in a widely distributed history published by the Oriental Translation Fund in 1834.

In the West, early published accounts of the Joseon kingdom are not extensive, but they are found in Sangoku Tsūran Zusetsu (published in Paris in 1832), and in Nihon ōdai ichiran (published in Paris in 1834). Joseon foreign relations and diplomacy are explicitly referenced in the 1834 work.

== Selected works ==
- 1711 -- Dongsarok.
- 1712 -- Conversation by Writing in Jianggnan (Ganggwan pildam).

== See also ==
- Joseon diplomacy
- Joseon missions to Japan
- Joseon tongsinsa

Preceded by Yun Jiwan	Joseon–Japanese; Edo period diplomacy 8th mission 1711	Succeeded by Hong Chi-jung
