= Sadae (disambiguation) =

Sadae (事大) is a Korean historical and philosophical term.

It may also refer to:

- Sadae (office), a governmental office of Taebong
- Sadaejuui (事大主義), a modern Korean polemical term
