= Yang Su (diplomat) =

Korean diplomat and ambassador

Yang Su (梁需, c.1410) was a Korean diplomat and ambassador, representing Joseon interests in a diplomatic mission to the Ashikaga shogunate (Muromachi bafuku) in Japan.

== 1409-1410 mission to Japan ==
King Taejong dispatched a diplomatic mission to Japan in 1409-1410.

- 1409 (Ōei 16, 3rd month): In the 10th year of King Taejong's reign, an ambassador from the Joseon court was received in Kyoto.

This delegation to court of Ashikaga Yoshimochi was led by Yan Yu. The purpose of this diplomatic embassy was to respond to a message sent to the Joseon court by the Japanese shogun. The Joseon envoy conveyed a letter of condolences on the death of the shogun's father; and he also brought gifts, including cotton cloth, tiger skins, leopard skins and ginseng. Yan Yu was empowered to offer to send a copy of a rare Buddhist text to Japan.

The Japanese hosts may have construed this mission as tending to confirm a Japanocentric world order. Yan Yu's actions were more narrowly focused in negotiating protocols for Joseon-Japan diplomatic relations.

== Recognition in the West ==
Yan Yu's historical significance was confirmed when his mission was specifically mentioned in a widely distributed history published by the Oriental Translation Fund in 1834.

In the West, early published accounts of the Joseon kingdom are not extensive, but they are found in Sangoku Tsūran Zusetsu (published in Paris in 1832), and in Nihon ōdai ichiran (published in Paris in 1834). Joseon foreign relations and diplomacy are explicitly referenced in the 1834 work.

== See also ==
- Joseon diplomacy
- Joseon missions to Japan
- Joseon tongsinsa
