= Yang Yu =

Yang Yu or Yu Yang may refer to:

== People surnamed Yang ==
- Yang Yu (swimmer) (born 1985), Chinese female swimmer
- Yang Yu (footballer) (born 1985), Chinese football player
- Yang Yu (skier) (born 1991), Chinese freestyle skier
- Yang Yü (diplomat) (born 1840), Chinese ambassador to the US and Russia
- Jiaozi (director) (born 1980), Chinese film director

== People surnamed Yu ==
- Yu Yang (actor, born 1970), Chinese actor in National Theatre of China.
- Yu Yang (field hockey) (born 1979), Chinese field hockey player
- Yu Yang (badminton) (born 1986), Chinese female badminton player
- Yu Yang (footballer, born 1989), Chinese football player
- Yu Yang (footballer, born 1983), Chinese former football player

== See also ==
- Yang You (605–619), known as Yang Yu in Wade-Giles, puppet Sui dynasty emperor
- Yang Su (diplomat) (fl. 1410), or Yang Yu in some sources, Joseon diplomat and ambassador to Japan
- Yangyu (disambiguation) for a list of places
- Yuyang (disambiguation) for a list of places
