= O Yun'gyŏm =

Korean diplomat

O Yun'gyŏm 오윤겸

Chief State Councillor
- In office 16 December 1628 – 22 September 1631
- Preceded by: Sim Hŭm
- Succeeded by: Yun Pang

Left State Councillor
- In office 21 October 1633 – 25 February 1636
- Preceded by: Kim Ryu
- Succeeded by: Hong Sŏbong
- In office 12 October 1627 – 17 August 1628
- Preceded by: Sin Hŭm
- Succeeded by: Kim Ryu

Right State Councillor
- In office 20 November 1626 – 12 October 1627
- Preceded by: Sim Hŭm
- Succeeded by: Kim Ryu

Personal details
- Born: 1559
- Died: 25 February 1636 (aged 76–77)

Korean name
- Hangul: 오윤겸
- Hanja: 吳允謙
- RR: O Yungyeom
- MR: O Yun'gyŏm

O Yun'gyŏm (1559–1636) was a Korean scholar-official and Chief State Councillor of the Joseon period.

He was also diplomat and ambassador, representing Joseon interests in the 2nd Edo period diplomatic mission to the Tokugawa shogunate in Japan.

== 1617 mission to Japan ==
O Yun'gyŏm was the leader selected by the Gwanghaegun of Joseon to head a mission to Japan in 1617. The diplomatic mission functioned to the advantage of both the Japanese and the Koreans as a channel for developing a political foundation for trade.

This delegation was explicitly identified by the Joseon court as a "Reply and Prisoner Repatriation Envoy" (회답겸쇄환사; 回答兼刷還使). The mission was not understood to signify that relations were "normalized."

The Joseon monarch's ambassador and retinue traveled only as far as Kyoto, where the delegation was received by Shōgun Hidetada at Fushimi Castle.

== See also ==
- Yeonguijeong
- Joseon diplomacy
- Joseon missions to Japan
- Joseon tongsinsa

== Notes ==
Preceded by Yeo U-gil	Joseon–Japanese; Edo period diplomacy 2nd mission 1617	Succeeded by Jeong Rip
