= Im Gwang =

Joseon scholar-official (1579–1644)

- Hangul: 임광
- Hanja: 任珖
- RR: Im Gwang
- MR: Im Kwang

Im Gwang (Korean: 임광; Hanja: 任珖; 1579–1644) was a Korean scholar-official of the Joseon period.

He was also diplomat and ambassador, representing Joseon interests in the 4th Edo period diplomatic mission to the Tokugawa shogunate in Japan.

== 1636 mission to Japan ==
In 1636, King Injo sent a mission to Japan led by Im Gwang. This diplomatic mission functioned to the advantage of both the Japanese and the Koreans as a channel for developing a political foundation for trade.

This delegation was explicitly identified by the Joseon court as a "Communication Envoy" (tongsinsa). The mission was understood to signify that relations were "normalized."

According to the Japanese calendar, the mission reached Japan in the 12th month of the 13th year of Kan'ei (1635).

This mission to the court of Shogun Tokugawa Iemitsu in Edo also encompassed a pilgrimage to the first shogun's mausoleum at Nikkō. The grand procession of the shogun and his entourage, which included the Joseon ambassador and his retinue, was recorded to have occurred in the 4th month of the 14th year of Kan'ei, as reckoned according to the Japanese calendar.

== Recognition in the West ==
Im Gwang's historical significance was confirmed when his mission and his name were specifically mentioned in a widely distributed history published by the Oriental Translation Fund in 1834.

In the West, early published accounts of the Joseon kingdom are not extensive, but they are found in Sangoku Tsūran Zusetsu (published in Paris in 1832), and in Nihon ōdai ichiran (published in Paris in 1834). Joseon foreign relations and diplomacy are explicitly referenced in the 1834 work.

== See also ==
- Joseon diplomacy
- Joseon missions to Japan
- Joseon tongsinsa

== Notes ==
Preceded by Jeong Rip	Joseon–Japanese; Edo period diplomacy 4th mission 1636	Succeeded by Yun Sunji
