= Pak An-sin =

Korean Scholar (1369–1447)

- Hangul: 박안신
- Hanja: 朴安臣
- RR: Bak Ansin
- MR: Pak Ansin

Pak An-sin (Korean: 박안신; Hanja: 朴安臣; 1369–1447) was a scholar-official of the Joseon Dynasty Korea in the 15th century.

He was also diplomat and ambassador, representing Joseon interests in a diplomatic mission to the Ashikaga shogunate in Japan.

== 1424 mission to Japan ==
King Sejong dispatched a diplomatic mission to Japan in 1424. This embassy to the court of Ashikaga Yoshinori was led by Pak An-sin. The delegation from the Joseon court traveled to Kyoto in response to a message sent by the Japanese shogun;

The Japanese hosts may have construed these mission as tending to confirm a Japanocentric world order. Pak An-sin and his delegation were more narrowly focused in negotiating protocols for Joseon-Japan diplomatic relations.

== See also ==
- Joseon diplomacy
- Joseon missions to Japan
- Joseon tongsinsa
