= Jeong Rip =

- Hangul: 정립
- Hanja: 鄭岦
- RR: Jeong Rip
- MR: Chŏng Rip

Jeong Rip (1574–1629) was a scholar-official of the Joseon Dynasty Korea.

He was also diplomat and ambassador, representing Joseon interests in the 3rd Edo period diplomatic mission to the Tokugawa shogunate in Japan.

== 1624 mission to Japan ==
Jeong Rip was the leader selected by the Joseon king to head a mission to Japan in 1624. This diplomatic mission functioned to the advantage of both the Japanese and the Koreans as a channel for developing a political foundation for trade.

This delegation was explicitly identified by the Joseon court as a "Reply and Prisoner Repatriation Envoy" (회답겸쇄환사, 回答兼刷還使). This mission was not understood to signify that relations were "normalized."

== See also ==
- Joseon diplomacy
- Joseon missions to Japan
- Joseon tongsinsa

== Notes ==
Preceded by O Yun-gyeom	Joseon–Japanese; Edo period diplomacy 3rd mission 1624	Succeeded by Im Gwang
