= Kyorin =

Kyorin may refer to:

- an alternate romanization for the Korean gyorin (교린청책; lit. "neighborly relations"), a neo-Confucian term applied to diplomacy and foreign relations, first used in early-Joseon period (1392-1910)
- Kyorin University, a private university in Tokyo
- Kyorin Pharmaceutical Company, a Japanese pharmaceutical company
