= Yi Ye =

Korean diplomat (1373–1445)

- Hangul: 이예
- Hanja: 李藝
- RR: I Ye
- MR: I Ye

Courtesy name
- Hangul: 학파
- Hanja: 鶴坡
- RR: Hakpa
- MR: Hakp'a

Posthumous name
- Hangul: 충숙
- Hanja: 忠肅
- RR: Chungsuk
- MR: Ch'ungsuk

Yi Ye (Korean: 이예; Hanja: 李藝; 1373–1445) was a nobleman and Korean civil minister and diplomat during the early Joseon Dynasty. He served as an ambassador to the Japanese Ashikaga shogunate and founded the Hakseong Yi clan (학성; 鶴城). He is notable for having negotiated the release of 667 Korean captives from wokou pirates in over 15 diplomatic missions, and for facilitating bi-national cooperation with Japan.

== Biography ==
=== Early years ===
Yi Ye was born to a chungin (middle-class) family of a minor official in 1373 in Ulsan, Gyeongsang Province during the last two decades of the Goryeo period. When he was eight years-old, his mother was kidnapped by the wokou.

On January 1, 1397, around 3000 wokou raiders invaded Uljupo harbor (울주포) in southeastern Korea and captured the county governor, Yi Ŭn (이은; 李殷). While other officials allegedly fled the attack, then-junior bureaucrat Yi Ye volunteered to join the captives in order to continue his duties to the governor. The pirates relocated the prisoners to Tsushima Island, where Yi Ye learned the Japanese language from one of the soldiers.

As a hostage, Yi persistently pleaded for the governor's release, and his display of loyalty impressed the pirates into agreeing to a mediation arranged by the Ashikaga shogunate. In February 1397, a Korean diplomatic goodwill mission, or Joseon Tongsinsa, facilitated the safe return of the governor and Yi Ye. Yi's actions were commended by the Joseon royal court, which opened an opportunity for him to rise from a position of a local middle-class official to that of a central government diplomat with yangban status (merit-based aristocrat).

Yi Ye eventually traveled back to Tsushima Island in 1400, after receiving permission by the royal court to join the diplomatic entourage of the envoy Yun Myŏng. He attempted to locate the whereabouts of his mother during this visit, but was unsuccessful.

=== Diplomatic career ===
During the 1st year of King Taejong's reign in 1401, Yi received his first assignment as a delegate to Japan, where he would travel to Iki Island to repatriate 50 Korean prisoners. Yi continued to commute yearly between the two nations in a diplomatic function to find and negotiate for release Korean captives such that about 500 were freed by 1410. On January 27, 1416, Yi was captured by pirates and was sent to the Ryukyu Islands. He was able to return to Korea, but revisited Ryukyu in the same year to arrange for the freedom of 44 others by July 23.

During the 18th and last year of King Taejong's reign in 1418, the death of Tsushima governor Sō Sadashige (宗貞茂) prompted the Joseon royal court to dispatch Yi on April 24 with gifts of condolences consisting of rice, beans, and papers. The significance of this gesture was to continue friendship between Joseon and the island's ruling Sō clan, such that the anti-piracy policies of the late Sadashige would continue to be enforced. However, power was soon seized from Sadashige's infant son Sadamori (宗貞盛) by pirate leader Soda Saemontaro, who resumed the plundering of Korean and Ming Chinese coasts. Taejong, who had just abdicated, but was still a military adviser to his successor, King Sejong, favored a retaliatory offensive response, and Yi Ye subsequently advised the royal Joseon Navy in logistics during the invasion of Tsushima in 1419.

During the 25th year of King Sejong's reign in 1443, a resurgence of wokou piracy prompted then 70-year-old Yi Ye to volunteer as an envoy to Tsushima one last time to return seven captives. By the end of his career, Yi had been dispatched to Japan over 40 times in ambassadorial function, and the Annals of the Joseon Dynasty records that he repatriated up to 667 Korean prisoners. To solidify a working foundation for diplomacy and trade between the two nations, Yi contributed to the negotiations for the Treaty of Gyehae (계해조약; 癸亥條約) in 1443. Yi's efforts at cultural diplomacy also allowed an exchange of the Japanese-improved watermill and sugarcane for Korean Buddhist culture and printing technology. A monument was dedicated to him at Entsuji Temple in Tsushima city to honor his commitment to a peaceful bilateral coexistence.

== Legacy ==
In 1910, Emperor Yunghui of Joseon bestowed the posthumous name of Chung-suk to Yi Ye for his achievements.

In 2005, the South Korean Ministry of Culture, Sports and Tourism designated Yi Ye to be the culture figure of the month of February, and in 2010, the South Korean Ministry of Foreign Affairs and Trade recognized him that year as a prominent diplomatic figure in Korean history.

In 2011, lawyer Noriyuki Kanazumi wrote a novel titled Yi Ye, the First Joseon Tongsinsa and dedicated it to the Seokgye Confucian Memorial Hall in Ulju county, Ulsan.

On June 1, 2013, a Korean-Japanese collaboration documentary titled "Yi Ye" directed by Hiroaki Inui was released in Tokyo cinema. It starred Yoon Tae-young as Yi Ye and was narrated by Etsuko Komiya.

== See also ==
- Joseon diplomacy
- Joseon missions to Japan
- Joseon tongsinsa
