= Foreign relations of Korea =

Foreign relations of Korea may refer to:

- Foreign relations of North Korea
- Foreign relations of South Korea
- Joseon diplomacy, the foreign relations of the Joseon dynasty
