= Gao Yuyang =

高宇洋 may refer to:

- Laura Gao
- Takahiro Ko

== See also ==
- Gao (surname)
- Yuyang (disambiguation)
