= Yun Sunji =

Korean scholar-official (1591–1666)

- Hangul: 윤순지
- Hanja: 尹順之
- RR: Yun Sunji
- MR: Yun Sunji

Yun Sunji (Korean: 윤순지; 1591–1666) was a Korean scholar-official of the Joseon period in the 17th century.

He was also diplomat and ambassador, representing Joseon interests in the 5th Edo period diplomatic mission to Japan.

== 1643 mission to Japan ==
In 1643, King Injo dispatched a mission to Japan. This diplomatic mission functioned to the advantage of both the Japanese and the Koreans as a channel for developing a political foundation for trade.

This delegation was explicitly identified by the Joseon court as a "Communication Envoy" (tongsinsa). The mission was understood to signify that relations were "normalized."

The Joseon embassy arrived at the shogunal court of Tokugawa Iemitsu in Edo on the 20th year of Kan'ei, according to the Japanese calendar in use at that time. The embassy of Joseon king was led by Yun Sunji. This delegation was received in the court of Shōgun Tokugawa Iemitsu in Edo; and the mission also completed a visit to Shōgun Ieaysu's mausoleum at Nikkō.

== Recognition in the West ==
Yun Sunji's historical significance was confirmed, when his mission was specifically mentioned in a widely distributed history published by the Oriental Translation Fund in 1834.

In the West, early published accounts of the Joseon kingdom are not extensive, but they are found in Sangoku Tsūran Zusetsu (published in Paris in 1832), and in Nihon ōdai ichiran (published in Paris in 1834). Joseon foreign relations and diplomacy are explicitly referenced in the 1834 work.

== See also ==
+ Joseon diplomacy

- Joseon missions to Japan
- Joseon tongsinsa

== Notes ==
Preceded by Im Gwang	Joseon–Japanese; Edo period diplomacy 5th mission 1643	Succeeded by Jo Hyeong
