= Hwang Sin =

Korean scholar-official (1560–1617)

- Hangul: 황신
- Hanja: 黃愼
- RR: Hwang Sin
- MR: Hwang Sin

Hwang Sin (Korean: 황신; Hanja: 黃愼; 1560–1617) was a Korean officer of the Joseon period; in the 16th and 17th centuries. In 1588, Hwang placed first in the final civil service examination (Mungwa).

He was also Korean diplomat and ambassador, representing Joseon interests in a diplomatic mission to the court of Toyotomi Hideyoshi in Japan.

== 1596–1597 mission to Japan ==
In the 23rd year of the reign of King Seonjo, the Joseon Court directed that a diplomatic mission to Japan would be dispatched to Kyoto. The Joseon representatives travelled with the Ming ambassadors who traveled to Kyoto to meet with Hideyoshi. The chief envoy of this Joseon delegation was Hwang sin.

The purpose of this embassy was negotiating end of hostilities on the Korean peninsula and withdrawal of invading Japanese forces. Hwang also hoped to arrange for the repatriation of more than 5,000 prisoners. However, the venture served only to arouse Hideyoshi's anger; and as a consequence, the Japanese forces were increased rather than reduced. Although diplomacy was intended to help move Joseon and Japan towards more normal relations, the mission was not understood to signify that relations were "normalized."

== See also ==
- Joseon diplomacy
- Joseon missions to Japan
- Joseon tongsinsa
