= Hee-kyung =

- Hangul: 희경
- RR: Huigyeong
- MR: Hŭigyŏng

Hee-kyung, also spelled Hui-gyeong, Hui-kyong, or Hi-kyung, is a Korean given name.

People with this name include:

- Eun Heekyung (born 1959), South Korean writer
- Hi Kyung Kim (born 1954), South Korean composer
- Jin Hee-kyung (born 1968), South Korean actress
- Moon Hee-kyung (born 1965), South Korean actress
- Noh Hee-kyung (born 1966), South Korean television screenwriter
- Park Hui-gyeong (born 1976), South Korean fencer
- Seo Hee-kyung (born 1986), South Korean professional golfer
- Song Hŭigyŏng (1376–1446), Joseon Dynasty scholar and official
- Wang Hee-kyung (born 1970), South Korean archer
- Wendy Hui Kyong Chun (born 1969), Canadian media professor
- Yang Hee-kyung (born 1954), South Korean actress

== See also ==
- List of Korean given names
