= Yangyu =

Yangyu may refer to:

- Yangyu, Shaanxi (阳峪), a town in Qian County, Shaanxi, China
- Yangyu Township (阳隅乡), a township in Wenxi County, Shanxi, China

== See also ==
- Yang Yu (disambiguation)
