= Ko Tŭkchong =

Korean scholar-official (1388–1452)

- Born: 1388
- Died: 1452 (aged 63–64)

Korean name
- Hangul: 고득종
- Hanja: 高得宗
- RR: Go Deukjong
- MR: Ko Tŭkchong

Ko Tŭkchong (Korean: 고득종; Hanja: 高得宗; 1388–1452) was a Korean scholar-official of the Joseon period in the 14th century.

He was also diplomat and ambassador, representing Joseon interests in the tongsinsa (diplomatic missions) to the Ashikaga shogunate in Japan.

== 1439 mission to Japan ==
King Sejong dispatched a diplomatic mission to Japan in 1439. This embassy to court of Ashikaga Yoshinori was led by Ko Tŭkchong. Its purpose was to foster and maintain neighborly relations (Kyorin diplomacy); and assistance from the shogun was sought in suppressing the pirate raids from those known in Korean as waegu or in Japanese as the wakō.

The Japanese hosts may have construed this mission as tending to confirm a Japanocentric world order. Ko Tŭkchong's actions were more narrowly focused in negotiating protocols for Joseon-Japan diplomatic relations.

== See also ==
- Joseon diplomacy
- Joseon missions to Japan
- Joseon tongsinsa
