= Hwang Yun-gil =

Joseon diplomat (fl. 16th century)

- Hangul: 황윤길
- Hanja: 黃允吉
- RR: Hwang Yungil
- MR: Hwang Yun'gil

Hwang Yun-gil (Korean: 황윤길; Hanja: 黃允吉; 1536–?), also known as Hwang Yun'gil, was a Korean diplomat and ambassador of the Joseon period. He was a member of the Western faction in the court. He represented Joseon's interests in a Joseon Tongsinsa (goodwill diplomatic mission) to Sengoku Japan under the control of Toyotomi Hideyoshi.

== 1590 mission to Japan ==
Between 1590 and 1591, King Seonjo of Joseon sent a mission to Japan led by Hwang Yun-gil, accompanied by Kim Sŏngil and Heo Seong. The chronology of this diplomatic embassy encompassed:

- September 1589 (22nd year of King Seonjo's rule: Gimi year): Dispatch of tongsinsa to Japan decided upon by the Joseon court.
- March 1590 (23rd year of King Seonjo's rule: Gyeongin year): The tongsinsa were sent to Japan.
- January 1591 (24th year of King Seonjo's rule: Sinmyo year): Hwang Yun-gil and others returned the port Busan.

A diplomatic mission conventionally consisted of three primary figures—the main envoy, the vice-envoy, and a document official. Also included were one or more official writers or recorders who created a detailed account of the mission. In 1607, Hwang Yun-gil was the main envoy; and he was accompanied by Kim Sŏngil, who was the vice-ambassador, and Hŏ Son, who was the document official.

== See also ==
- Joseon diplomacy
- Joseon missions to Japan
- Tsūkō ichiran, mid-19th century text
- Imjin War
