= Yun Myŏng =

Korean diplomat

- Hangul: 윤명
- Hanja: 尹銘
- RR: Yun Myeong
- MR: Yun Myŏng

Yun Myŏng was a Korean scholar-official of the Joseon period in the 15th century.

He was also a diplomat and ambassador, representing Joseon interests in a diplomatic mission to the Ashikaga shogunate in Japan.

== 1406 mission to Japan ==
King Taejong dispatched a diplomatic mission to Japan in 1406. This delegation to court of Ashikaga Yoshimochi was led by Yun Myŏng. The purpose of this diplomatic embassy was to respond to a message sent to the Joseon court by the Japanese shogun.

The Japanese hosts may have construed this mission as tending to confirm a Japanocentric world order. Yun Myŏng's actions were more narrowly focused in negotiating protocols for Joseon-Japan diplomatic relations.

== See also ==
- Joseon diplomacy
- Joseon missions to Japan
- Joseon tongsinsa
