= Song Hŭigyŏng =

- Hangul: 송희경
- Hanja: 宋希璟
- RR: Song Huigyeong
- MR: Song Hŭigyŏng

Song Hŭigyŏng (Korean: 송희경; Hanja: 宋希璟; 1376–1446) was a Korean scholar-official of the Joseon period in the 15th century.

He was also diplomat and ambassador, representing Joseon interests in the Hoeryesa (diplomatic mission) to the Ashikaga shogunate in Japan.

== 1419–1420 mission to Japan ==
King Sejong dispatched a diplomatic mission to Japan in 1419–1420. This embassy to court of Ashikaga Yoshimasa in Kamakura was led by Song Hŭigyŏng. Its purpose was to respond to a message sent to the Joseon court by the Japanese shogun.

The Japanese hosts may have construed this mission as tending to confirm a Japanocentric world order. Song Hŭigyŏng's actions were more narrowly focused in negotiating protocols for Joseon-Japan diplomatic relations.

== See also ==
- Joseon diplomacy
- Joseon missions to Japan
- Joseon tongsinsa
