= Hamyang Yeo clan =

Korean clan from South Gyeongsang Province

- Country: Korea
- Current region: Hamyang County
- Founder: Yeo Eo mae
- Connected members: Yeo Jin-goo; Yeo Woon-kon; Yeo Woon-kay; Lyuh Woon-hyung; Yeo U-gil; Yeo Han-koo

Hamyang Yeo clan (Korean: 함양 여씨; Hanja: 咸陽 呂氏) is one of the Korean clans. Their Bon-gwan is in Hamyang County, South Gyeongsang Province. According to the research held in 2015, the number of Hamyang Yeo clan was 34835. Their founder was Yeo Eo mae who was a Hanlin Academy in Tang dynasty, China. He was naturalized in Silla during the rebellion of Huang Chao.

== See also ==
- Korean clan names of foreign origin
