= Kim Igyo =

Korean scholar-official (1764–1832)

Kim Igyo 김이교
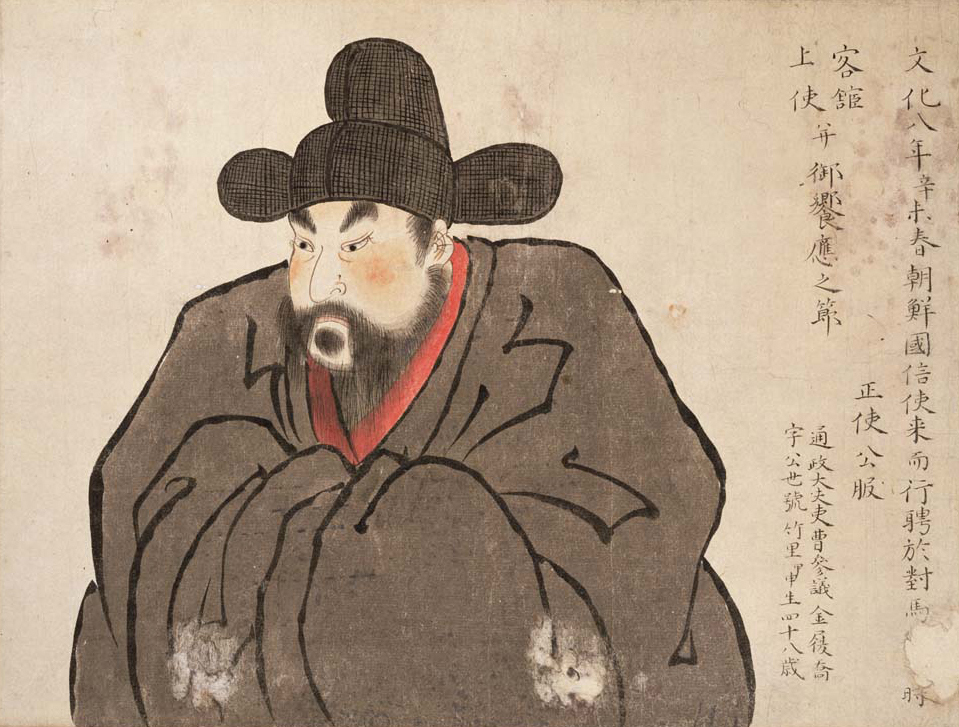
- Japanese painting of Kim, ca. 1811

Right State Councillor
- In office 3 March 1831 – 25 August 1832
- Preceded by: Jeong Man-seok
- Succeeded by: Sim Sang-gyu

Personal details
- Born: 1764
- Died: 25 August 1832 (aged 67–68)

Korean name
- Hangul: 김이교
- Hanja: 金履喬
- RR: Gim Igyo
- MR: Kim Igyo

Kim Igyo (Korean: 김이교; Hanja: 金履喬; 1764 – 25 August 1832) was a scholar-official and Uuijeong of the Joseon dynasty Korea.

He was also diplomat and ambassador, representing Joseon interests in the 12th Edo period diplomatic mission to the Tokugawa shogunate in Japan.

== 1811 mission to Japan ==
Kim Igyo was the leader selected by Sunjo of Joseon to head a mission to Japan in 1811. This diplomatic mission functioned to the advantage of both the Japanese and the Koreans as a channel for maintainining a political foundation for trade.

This delegation was explicitly identified by the Joseon court as a "Communication Envoy" (tongsinsa). The mission was understood to signify that relations were "normalized".

The Joseon monarch's ambassador and retinue traveled only as far as Tsushima. The representatives of shōgun Ienari met the mission on the island which is located in the middle of the Korea Strait between the Korean Peninsula and Kyushu.

== Family ==
- Father
  - Kim Bang-haeng (김방행; 1738–1793)
- Mother
  - Biological – Lady Sim of the Cheongsong Sim clan (청송 심씨; 靑松 沈氏; 1739–1808); Kim Bang-haeng's third wife
  - Step – Lady Yi (이씨; 1734–?); Kim Bang-haeng's first wife
  - Step – Lady Yun (윤씨; 1735–1754); Kim Bang-haeng's second wife
- Siblings
  - Younger sister – Lady Kim of the Andong Kim clan (안동 김씨; 1765–?)
  - Younger brother – Kim Yi-jae (김이재; 1767–1847)
  - Younger brother – Kim Yi-hoe (김이회; 1771–1821)
- Spouse
  - Lady Eo of the Hamjong Eo clan (함종 어씨; 1764–1834)
- Issue
  - Son – Kim Yeong-sun (김영순; 1798–1849)
  - Son – Kim Mun-sun (김무순; 1802–1881)

== See also ==
- Joseon diplomacy
- Joseon missions to Japan
- Joseon tongsinsa

== Notes ==
Preceded by Jo Eom	Joseon–Japanese; Edo period diplomacy 12th mission 1811	Succeeded by –
