= Yun Jiwan =

Yun Ji-wan 윤지완

Right State Councillor
- In office 20 May 1694 – 3 February 1695
- Preceded by: Min Am
- Succeeded by: Ryu Sang-un

Personal details
- Born: 1635
- Died: 1718 (aged 82–83)

Korean name
- Hangul: 윤지완
- Hanja: 尹趾完
- RR: Yun Jiwan
- MR: Yun Chiwan

Yun Jiwan (1635–1718) was a Korean scholar-official of the Joseon period in the 17th and 18th centuries.

He was also diplomat and ambassador, representing Joseon interests in the 7th Edo period diplomatic mission to the Tokugawa shogunate in Japan.

== 1682 mission to Japan ==
In 1682, King Sukjong of Joseon caused a mission to be sent to Japan; and Yun Jiwan was the chief emissary. This diplomatic mission functioned to the advantage of both the Japanese and the Koreans as a channel for developing a political foundation for trade.

This delegation was explicitly identified by the Joseon court as a "Communication Envoy" (tongsinsa). The mission was understood to signify that relations were "normalized."

== See also ==
- Joseon diplomacy
- Joseon missions to Japan
- Joseon tongsinsa

== Notes ==
Preceded by Jo Hyeong	Joseon–Japanese; Edo period diplomacy 7th mission 1682	Succeeded by Jo Tae-eok
