= Yeo U-gil =

- Hangul: 여우길
- Hanja: 呂祐吉
- RR: Yeo Ugil
- MR: Yŏ Ugil

Yeo U-gil (Korean: 여우길; Hanja: 呂祐吉; 1567–1632) was a Korean scholar-official of the Joseon period.

He was also diplomat and ambassador, representing Joseon interests in the 1st Edo period diplomatic mission to the Tokugawa shogunate in Japan.

== 1607 mission to Japan ==
This embassy represented King Seonjo of Joseon, traveling to Edo for an audience with Shogun Tokugawa Hidetada; and Yeo U-gil was the chief Joseon envoy. The diplomatic mission functioned to the advantage of both the Japanese and the Koreans as a channel for maintaining a political foundation for trade.

This delegation was explicitly identified by the Joseon court as a "Reply and Prisoner Repatriation Envoy" (회답겸쇄환사; 回答兼刷還使). The mission was not understood to signify that relations were "normalized."

A diplomatic mission conventionally consisted of three envoys—the main envoy, the vice-envoy, and a document official. Also included were one or more official writers or recorders who created a detailed account of the mission. In 1607, Yeo U-gil was the main envoy and Kyŏng Sŏn was the vice-ambassador.

== See also ==
- Joseon diplomacy
- Joseon missions to Japan
- Joseon tongsinsa

Preceded by –	Joseon–Japanese; Edo period diplomacy 1st mission 1607	Succeeded by O Yun-gyeom
