= Sadae (office) =

Historic governmental office of Taebong

- Hangul: 사대
- Hanja: 史臺
- Revised Romanization: Sadae
- McCune–Reischauer: Sadae

Saedae was a government office of the Taebong state (also known as Later Goguryo or Majin), a short-lived kingdom (901–918) founded by Gung Ye during the Later Three Kingdoms period (892–936) of Korea.

According to historical records in Samguk Sagi ("History of the Three Kingdoms"), as Gung Ye changed the name of the state to Majin (摩震) and named the era "Mutae" (武泰) in 904, he revised the administrative system in reference to those of Silla. In the process, he established Gwangpyeongseong (廣評省), the highest administrative office which consisted of 18 departments called Gwanbu including Sadae and Byeongbu (兵部). The Saedae office took charge of education on yeogeo or foreign language. According to the records, learning foreign languages was regarded as important in ancient Korean society.

== See also ==
- Later Three Kingdoms
- Goryeo
