= Pyŏgwisinp'yŏn =

19th century Korean political book

- Hangul: 벽위신편
- Hanja: 闢衛新編
- RR: Byeogwisinpyeon
- MR: Pyŏgwisinp'yŏn

The Pyŏgwisinp'yŏn (Korean: 벽위신편; A New Compilation of Materials for Rejecting Heterodoxy and Defending Orthodoxy) was a Korean book written by the Joseon official Yun Jong-ui 尹宗儀 (1805–1886).

The Pyŏgwisinp'yŏn was Jun's response to the increasing incursions of Western powers and the threat they posed to Korea. The work went through several versions between the 1840s and the 1880s, each reflecting Yun's changing opinion regarding Westerners and how best to deal with them.

Yun was better informed of the West than many of his Confucian contemporaries in Korea. Nevertheless, as its title implies, the Pyŏgwisinp'yŏn was ultimately a conservative and isolationist work whose primary aim was to outline strategies for accomplishing "byeoksa wijeong" (reject heterodoxy and defend orthodoxy) . His opinions changed over time only regarding the best manner of doing this, with Yun ultimately urging the necessity of studying and understanding the West and adopting Western technologies to protect Korea.
