= Sadae =

Korean Confucian concept on relationships

- Hangul: 사대
- Hanja: 事大
- RR: sadae
- MR: sadae

Sadae (Korean: 사대; Hanja: 事大; lit. 'serving the great') is a Korean term which is used in pre-modern contexts. Sadae is a Confucian concept, based on filial piety, that describes a reciprocal hierarchical relationship between a senior and a junior, such as a tributary relationship. The term is used as a descriptive label for bilateral foreign relations between Imperial China and Joseon dynasty Korea. Korea's sadae toward China was first employed by Silla in the 7th century, but it was not fully implemented until the Confucianization of Korea in the early Joseon dynasty. Korea's sadae toward China from the 7th century to the 13th century was only nominal.

Sadae describes a foreign policy characterized by the various ways a small country acknowledges the strength of a greater power like that of China. Sadae is made manifest in the actions of the weaker state as it conveys goodwill and respect through its envoys.

The utility of the sadae concept in Korea was recognized from the period of Three Kingdoms of Korea to 1895; and it is demonstrated in the relationship of mid-Joseon Korea towards the Ming Dynasty of China. The Joseon Dynasty made every effort to maintain a friendly relationship with Beijing for reasons having to do with realpolitik and with an idealized Confucian worldview. Sadae construes China as the center of a Confucian moral universe.

As a foundation of diplomacy, the Joseon kingdom presumed that the Korean state was positioned within a Sinocentristic world order. The Joseon foreign policy was organized around maintaining stable Joseon–Chinese relations in the period from 1392 through 1895. The concept of sadae is contrasted with limited trade relationships or kyorin diplomacy (교린정책; 交隣政策; lit. 'neighborly relations') which marked Joseon–Japanese relations in this period.

== Etymology ==
The historical term is derived from the Chinese shì dà (事大; Korean sadae) as used by the philosopher Mencius. Sadae literally means "dealing with the great" or "serving the great" and can be interpreted as "Loving and admiring the great and powerful". The original phrase "以小事大" in the Book of Mencius means "service to the great by the small" or "a small kingdom accommodates a large":

The king Xuan of Qi asked, saying, 'Is there any way to regulate one's maintenance of intercourse with neighbouring kingdoms?'

Mencius replied, 'Yes, there is. But it requires a perfectly virtuous prince to be able, with a great country, to serve a small one - as, for instance, Tang served Ge, and King Wen served the Kun barbarians. And it requires a wise prince to be able, with a small country, to serve a large one - as the King Tai served the Xunyu, and Goujian served Wu. He who with a great State serves a small one, delights in Heaven. He who with a small State serves a large one, stands in awe of Heaven. He who delights in Heaven, will affect with his love and protection the whole kingdom. He who stands in awe of Heaven, will affect with his love and protection his own kingdom. It is said in the Book of Poetry, "I fear the Majesty of Heaven, and will thus preserve its favouring decree." '

—

The neutral term is distinguished from the pejorative sadaejuui, which was invented by early 20th century Korean nationalists. Juui means "ideology" and it is conventionally translated as "-ism."

== Sadaejuui: 20th-century reinterpretation ==
- Sadaejuui
- Hangul: 사대주의
- Hanja: 事大主義
- RR: sadaejuui
- MR: sadaejuŭi

Sadaejuui (Korean: 사대주의; lit. 'serving-the-great ideology') is a largely pejorative Korean term which evolved in the mid-20th century from the more widely used historical concept of sadae. The term "sadaejuui" was invented by early 20th century Korean nationalists.

Sadaejuui conflates an attitude of subservience with the political realism which accompanies the prudent recognition of greater power.

The concept of sadae was rejected in the writings of polemicist Shin Chaeho and other Korean nationalists in the 20th century. Shin is known for having argued that the sadae or sadaejuui inherent in Confucian historiography served effectively functioned in two ways:

- to devalue the ethnic origins of the Korean people and state
- to subjugate Korean history within a Confucian interpretive framework

His revisionist writings sought to deny the relevance of sadae as an important element of Korean history.

Kim Il Sung also opposed the "sadaejuui" and used the word in contrast to his ideology "juche" (self reliance). In December 28, 1955 he officially denounced it in his speech On Eliminating Dogmatism and Formalism and Establishing Juche in Ideological Work he sees the sadaejuui as an ideological colonisation of Korea, therefore establishing a nationalist and Anti-imperialist basis of opposing the idea of sadaejuui. For Kim Il Sung, the sadaejuui meant the dark ages of the past and overdependence to foreign powers a form of sycophancy, so as he saw it backwards he would seek all the ways to defend his ideas against it.

== See also ==
- Emperor at home, king abroad
- Finlandization
- Gyorin
- Joseon diplomacy
- Melian dialog
- Samguk Sagi
- Tribute
- Analogous concepts:
  - West British
  - Little Russian
