= Yuyang =

Yuyang may refer to the following places in China:

- Yuyang District, a district in Yulin, Shaanxi
- Yuyang Commandery, a historical region in North China
- Yuayang Town (渔洋), a town in Qianjiang, Hubei
- Yuyang Subdistrict (玉阳街道), a subdistrict in Dangyang, Hubei
- Yuyang, postal romanization for Youyang Tujia and Miao Autonomous County, Chongqing

== See also ==
- Yu Yang (disambiguation)
