= Pak Sŏ-saeng =

Korean civil minister

- Hangul: 박서생
- Hanja: 朴瑞生
- RR: Bak Seosaeng
- MR: Pak Sŏsaeng

Art name
- Hangul: 율정
- Hanja: 栗亭
- RR: Yuljeong
- MR: Yulchŏng

Courtesy name
- Hangul: 여상
- Hanja: 汝祥
- RR: Yeosang
- MR: Yŏsang

Pak Sŏ-saeng (Korean: 박서생; Hanja: 朴瑞生; ?–?) was a Korean civil minister (munsin) in the 15th century during the early period of the Korean Joseon Dynasty (1392–1897). Pak was also diplomat and ambassador, representing Joseon interests in the Tongsinsa to the Ashikaga shogunate in Japan.

== Biography ==
The birth and death dates of Pak Sŏ-saeng are unknown. Pak belonged to the Bian Pak clan, and his grandfather was Pak Yun-bo (박윤보; 朴允甫) and his father was Pak Chŏm (박점; 朴漸) who served as a senior colonel (Korean: 중랑장; Hanja: 中郎將; MR: chungnangjang). Pak Sŏ-saeng's art name was Yulchŏng, and his courtesy name was Yŏsang.

He learned Neo-Confucianism from Kil Chae, one of the great Neo-Confucian scholars of Korea. In 1401, he passed gwageo, the state examination, with a low grade. In 1407, he passed high grade examination and served for the government as the chŏngŏn (정언; 正言), and became pyŏngjo chwarang, the next year. In 1419, he was appointed chibŭi (집의; 執義), and he was promoted as taesasŏng (대사성; 大司成) in 1426.

King Sejong the Great sent a diplomatic mission to Japan (Joseon Tongsinsa) in 1428. This embassy to court of Ashikaga Yoshinori was led by Pak Sŏ-saeng. Its purpose was to respond to a message sent to the Joseon court by the Japanese shogun. In 1430, he was appointed Chiphyŏnjŏn pujehak (집현전 부제학; 集賢殿副提學). Soon after that, he became kongjo ch'amŭi and pyŏngjo ch'amŭi (참의; 參議), minister of Yukjo, the Six Ministries. In 1432, he was appointed the administrator of Andong.

After his death, Pak Sŏ-saeng was enshrined in the Gucheon Seowon in Uiseong, North Gyeongsang. Pak's writings are preserved in the Yaŭn ŏnhaengnok (야은언행록; 冶隱言行錄).

== See also ==
- List of Joseon Dynasty people
- Joseon Tongsinsa
