= Gyorin =

Joseon Korean diplomatic policy term

- Hangul: 교린 정책
- Hanja: 交隣政策
- RR: gyorin jeongchaek
- MR: kyorin chŏngch'aek

Gyorin (lit. "neighborly relations") was a neo-Confucian term developed in Joseon Korea. The term was intended to identify and characterize a diplomatic policy which establishes and maintains amicable relations with neighboring states. It was construed and understood in tandem with a corollary term, which was the sadae or "serving the great" policy towards Imperial China.

Confucian learning contributed in the formation of gyorin and sadae as ritual, conceptual and normative frameworks for construing interactions and political decision-making.

== Multi-national foreign policy ==
The rationale expressed by gyorin was applied to a multi-national foreign policy. Scholarly writing about the Joseon dynasty has tended to focus on diplomatic relations with China and Japan, but the intermediary nature of gyorin contacts—for example, Joseon-Ryukyuan diplomatic and trading contacts—were important as well. Envoys from the Ryūkyū Kingdom were received by Taejo of Joseon in 1392, 1394 and 1397. Siam sent an envoy to Taejo's court in 1393.

The long-term, strategic gyorin policy played out in bilateral diplomacy and trade dealings with the Jurchen tribes, Japan, the Ryūkyū Kingdom, Siam, and others. Over time, diplomatic and trade policies were perceived by Joseon's partners as the traditional door through which trends in neo-Confucian philosophical principles were recognized.

The Joseon kingdom made every effort to maintain a friendly bilateral relationship with China for reasons having to do with both realpolitik and a more idealist Confucian worldview wherein China was seen as the center of a Confucian moral universe. Joseon diplomacy was no less aware and sensitive to realpolitik in the implementation of gyorin policy.

The unique nature of gyorin bilateral diplomatic exchanges evolved from a conceptual framework developed by the Chinese. Gradually, the theoretical models would be modified, mirroring the evolution of a unique relationship.

== See also ==
- Joseon diplomacy
- Neo-Confucianism
