= Sangoku Tsūran Zusetsu =

1785 Japanese gazetteer

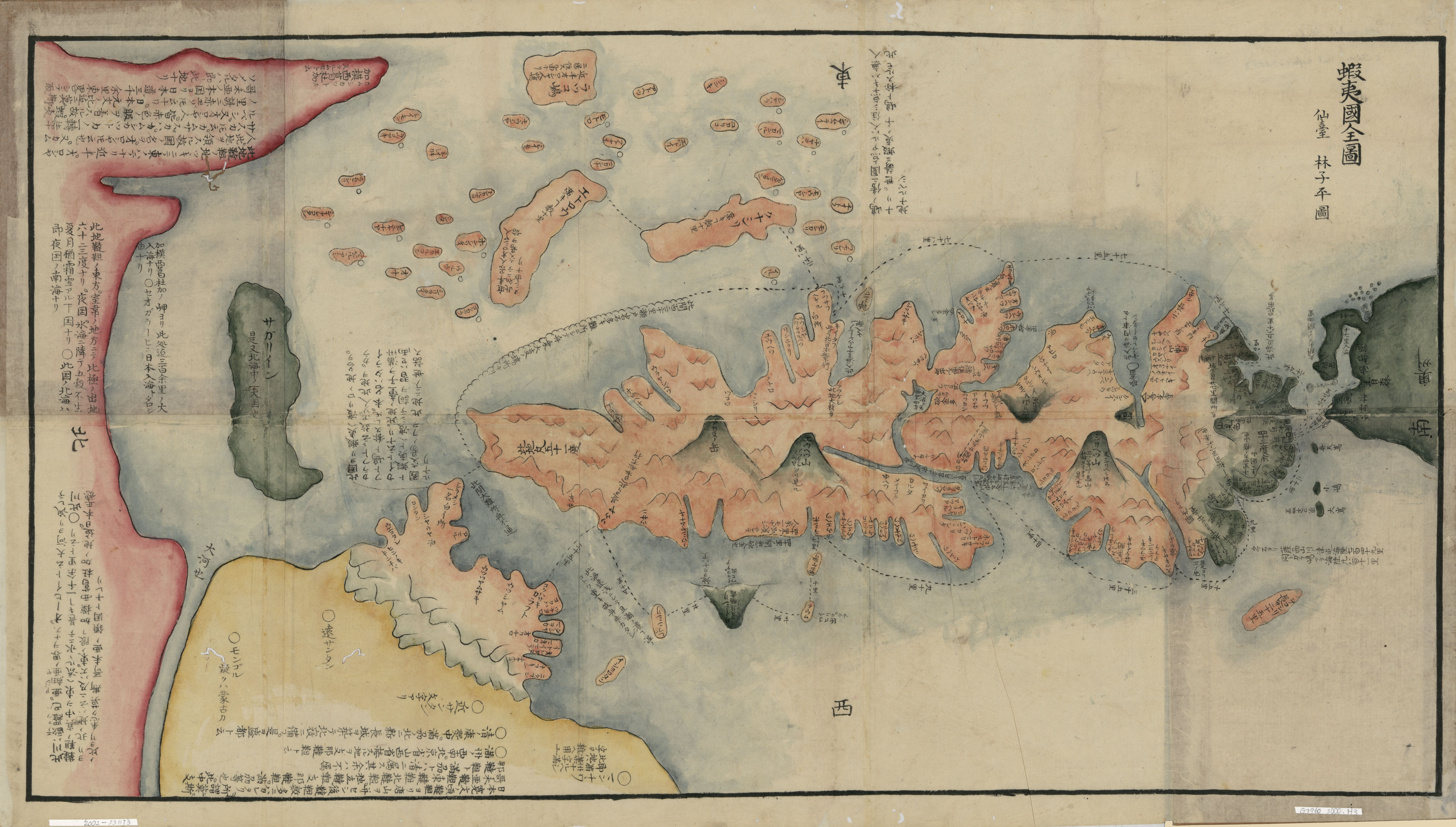

Sangoku Tsūran Zusetsu (三国通覧図説, An Illustrated Description of Three Countries) by Hayashi Shihei (1738–1793) was published in Japan in 1786. This book represents one of the earliest attempts to define Japan in terms of its outer boundaries. It represented a modern effort to distinguish Japan from the neighboring nations.

The book describes those three surrounding nations: the Joseon Dynasty (Korea), the Ryukyu Kingdom (Ryukyu Islands/Okinawa) and Ezo (Hokkaido), as well as the yet uninhabited Bonin Islands.

A copy of the Sangoku Tsūran Zusetsu was brought to Europe by Isaac Titsingh. In Paris, the text represented the first appearance of Korean han'gŭl in Europe. After Titsingh's death, the printed original and Titsingh's translation were purchased by Jean-Pierre Abel-Rémusat at the Collège de France, where—through a series of errors on Abel-Rémusat's part—it gave the Bonin Islands their name. After Rémusat's death, Julius Klaproth at the Institut Royal in Paris published his version of Titsingh's work. In 1832, the Oriental Translation Fund of Great Britain and Ireland supported the posthumous abridged publication of Titsingh's French translation.

== See also ==
- List of Japanese classic texts
- Bonin Islands
