= Nihon Ōdai Ichiran =

17th-century history book

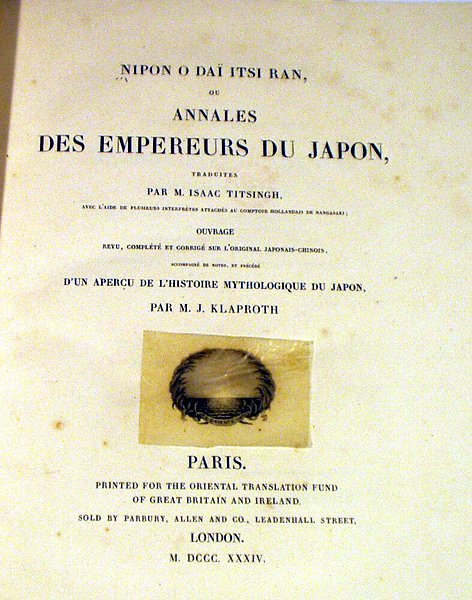
Nihon Ōdai Ichiran, 1834 French translation title page

Nihon Ōdai Ichiran (日本王代一覧, Nihon ōdai ichiran), The Table of the Rulers of Japan, is a 17th-century chronicle of the serial reigns of Japanese emperors with brief notes about some of the noteworthy events or other happenings.

According to the 1871 edition of the American Cyclopaedia, the 1834 French translation of Nihon Ōdai Ichiran was one of very few books about Japan available in the Western world.

== Prepared under the patronage of the tairō Sakai Tadakatsu ==
The material selected for inclusion in the narrative reflects the perspective of its original Japanese author and his samurai patron, the tairō Sakai Tadakatsu, who was daimyō of the Obama Domain of Wakasa Province. It was the first book of its type to be brought from Japan to Europe, and was translated into French as "Nipon o daï itsi ran".

Dutch Orientalist and scholar Isaac Titsingh brought the seven volumes of Nihon Ōdai Ichiran with him when he returned to Europe in 1797 after twenty years in the Far East. All these books were lost in the turmoil of the Napoleonic Wars, but Titsingh's French translation was posthumously published.

The manuscript languished after Titsingh's death in 1812; but the project was revived when the Oriental Translation Fund of Great Britain and Ireland sponsored printing and publication in Paris with distribution to be handled from London. The Paris-based philologist and orientalist Julius Klaproth was engaged to shepherd the text into its final printed form in 1834, including a Supplément aux Annales des Daïri, which generally mirrors the pattern of Titsingh's initial Annales des empereurs du Japon; and the reach of this additional material stretches thinly through the 18th century history of Japan.

=== First book of its type to be published in the West ===
This became the first Japanese-authored historical account of its sort to be published and circulated for scholarly study in the West. It is fitting that this rare book was selected as one of the first to be scanned and uploaded for online study as part of an ongoing international digitization project which has now been renamed the Google Books Library Project:

Titsingh, Isaac, ed. (1834). [Siyun-sai Rin-siyo/Hayashi Gahō (1652)], Nipon o daï itsi ran; ou, Annales des empereurs du Japon, tr. par M. Isaac Titsingh avec l'aide de plusieurs interprètes attachés au comptoir hollandais de Nangasaki; ouvrage re., complété et cor. sur l'original japonais-chinois, accompagné de notes et précédé d'un Aperçu d'histoire mythologique du Japon, par M. J. Klaproth. Paris: Oriental Translation Fund of Great Britain and Ireland.--Two copies of this rare book have now been made available online: (1) from the library of the University of Michigan, digitized January 30, 2007; and (2) from the library of Stanford University, digitized June 23, 2006. Click here to read the original text in French.

This sample page from Nihon Ōdai Ichiran illustrates the book's section layout, merged composition of Japanese kanji and French type-face text, and rare pre-Hepburn transliterations in the context of the original published paragraphs.

Work on this volume was substantially complete in 1783 when Titsingh sent a manuscript copy to Kutsuki Masatsuna, daimyo of Tamba. Masatsuna's comments on this text were lost in a shipwreck as the edited manuscript was being forwarded from Japan to India in 1785 where Titsingh had become head of the Dutch East Indies Company trade operations at Hoogly in West Bengal. The final version of Titsingh's dedication of the book to his friend Masatsuna was drafted in 1807, a little more than a quarter-century before the book was eventually published.

=== 17th-century text in Japanese and Chinese ===
The original multi-volume text was compiled in the early 1650s by Hayashi Gahō. His father, Hayashi Razan, had developed a compelling, practical blending of Shinto and Confucian beliefs and practices. Razan's ideas lent themselves to a well-accepted program of samurai and bureaucrat educational, training and testing protocols. In 1607, Razan was accepted as a political advisor to the second shōgun, Tokugawa Hidetada. Sometime thereafter, he became the rector of Edo's Confucian Academy, the Shōhei-kō. This institution stood at the apex of the country-wide educational and training system which was created and maintained by the Tokugawa shogunate.

In the elevated context his father engendered, Gahō himself was also accepted as a noteworthy scholar in that period. The Hayashi and the Shōheikō links to the work's circulation are part of the explanation for this work's 18th and 19th century popularity. Gahō was also the author of other works designed to help readers learn from Japan's history, including the 310 volumes of The Comprehensive History of Japan (本朝通鑑/ほんちょうつがん, Honchō-tsugan) which was published in 1670.

The narrative of Nihon Ōdai Ichiran stops around 1600, most likely in deference to the sensibilities of the Tokugawa regime. Gahō's text did not continue up through his present day; but rather, he terminated the chronicles just before the last pre-Tokugawa ruler.

In Keian 5, 5th month (1652), Nihon Ōdai Ichiran was first published in Kyoto under the patronage of one of the three most powerful men in the Tokugawa bakufu, the tairō Sakai Tadakatsu. In supporting this work, Sakai Todakatsu's motivations appear to spread across a range anticipated consequences; and it becomes likely that his several intentions in seeing that this specific work fell into the hands of an empathetic Western translator were similarly multi-faceted.

Gahō's book was published in the mid-17th century and it was reissued in 1803, "perhaps because it was a necessary reference work for officials." Contemporary readers must have found some degree of usefulness in this chronicle; and those who ensured that this particular manuscript made its way into the hands of Isaac Titsingh must have been persuaded that something of value could become accessible for readers in the West.

Post-Meiji scholars who have cited Nihon Ōdai Ichiran as a useful source of information include, for example, Richard Ponsonby-Fane in Kyoto: the Old Capital of Japan, 794-1869. The American poet Ezra Pound, writing to a contemporary Japanese poet in 1939, confirmed that his reference library included a copy of Nihon Ōdai Ichiran. At that time, Pound explained that "as far as [he had] time to read", the work seemed a "mere chronicle." However, modern literary critics have demonstrated by textual comparisons that Pound relied on Titsingh's French translation in crafting some sections of the Cantos.

=== 19th century translation in French ===
Titsingh's translation was eventually published in Paris in 1834 under the title Annales des empereurs du Japon. The 1834 printing incorporates a slim "supplement" with material which post-dates Titsingh's departure from Japan in 1784. This additional section of the book was not the product of translation, but must have been informed by oral accounts or correspondence with Japanese friends or European colleagues still in Japan.

Titsingh worked on this translation for years before his death; and in those final years in Paris, he shared his progress with orientalists Julius Klaproth and Jean-Pierre Abel-Rémusat, who would edit his first published posthumous book: Mémoires et anecdotes sur la dynastie régnante des djogouns (Memoirs and anecdotes on the reigning dynasty of shōguns). Rémusat would later become the first professor of Chinese language at the Collège de France. Titsingh's correspondence with William Marsden, a philologist colleague in the Royal Society in London, provides some insight into the translator's personal appreciation of the task at hand. In an 1809 letter, he explains:

"Accompanying I offer you the three first volumes of [Nihon Ōdai Ichiran] ... Notwithstanding the clouds of darkness [concerning] the origin of the Japanese ..., [the] progressive detail of the various occurrences spread much light on the customs still prevailing, and fully proves, they have been already a civilized and enlightened nation at the time our modern empires were either unknown, or plunged in the utmost barbarism ... We are no prophets. We cannot foretell what at a more distant period is to happen; but for the present, it is a fact [that] nobody exists in Europe but me, who can [provide] such an ample and faithful detail about a nation, quite unknown here, though fully deserving to be so in every respect." – Isaac Titsingh

Klaproth dedicated the book to George Fitz-Clarence, the Earl of Munster, who was Vice President of the Royal Asiatic Society and also a Vice Chairman and Treasurer of the Oriental Translation Fund of Great Britain and Ireland. The fund had sponsored Klaproth's work and was the principal underwriter of the publication costs

== Critical analysis ==
Japanologist John Whitney Hall, in his Harvard-Yenching monograph on Tanuma Okitsugu assessed the utility of this translation and its context:

These few examples of the outstanding contacts which Titsingh records suffice to give us an idea of the intimate associations which the Japanese had established with the Dutch at this time, associations from which the Dutch were also to gain a great deal. Titsingh's Illustrations of Japan shows the result of careful translation from Japanese sources, as does also the posthumous Annales des Empereurs du Japon, which is a translation of the Ōdai-ichiran. Titsingh's ability to take away without molestation numerous books on Japan as well as maps and drawings of the Japanese islands illustrates the liberal state of affairs at Nagasaki.

Isaac Titsingh himself considered the Nihon odai ichiran fairly dry. He viewed the work of translation as "a most tedious task".

== See also ==
- Historiographical Institute of the University of Tokyo
- International Research Center for Japanese Studies
- Historiography of Japan
