= Joseon Tongsinsa =

14th–19th century missions to Japan

Japanese name
- Kanji: 朝鮮通信使
Transcriptions
- Romanization: Chōsen tsūshinshi

Korean name
- Hangul: 조선통신사
- Hanja: 朝鮮通信使
Transcriptions
- Revised Romanization: Joseon tongsinsa
- McCune–Reischauer: Chosŏn t'ongsinsa

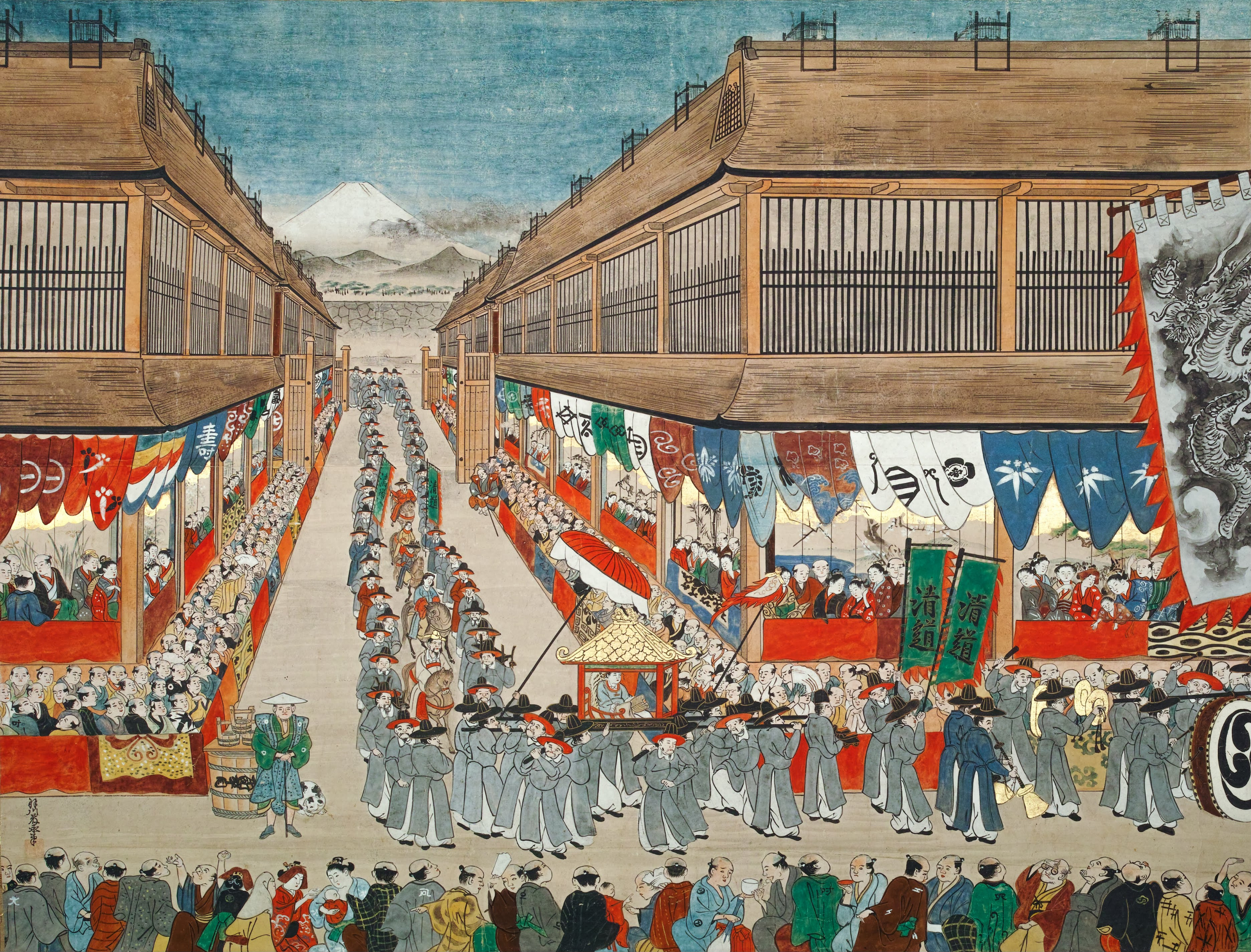
Chōsen_Tsūshin-shi_Raichō-zu(朝鮮通信使來朝圖) by Hanegawa Tōei(羽川藤永), c. 1748, a 'Chōsen-jin Uki-e(朝鮮人浮絵)' that depicts a Joseon diplomatic procession through the streets of Edo in 1748.Kobe City Museum

The Joseon Tongsinsa (Korean: 조선통신사) were goodwill missions sent intermittently, at the request of the resident Japanese authority, by Joseon dynasty Korea to Japan. The Korean noun identifies a specific type of diplomatic delegation and its chief envoys. From the Joseon diplomatic perspective, the formal description of a mission as a tongsinsa signified that relations were largely "normalized," as opposed to missions that were not called tongsinsa.

Diplomatic envoys were sent to the Muromachi shogunate and to Toyotomi Hideyoshi between 1392 and 1590. Similar missions were dispatched to the Tokugawa shogunate in Japan between 1607 and 1811. After the 1811 mission, another mission was prepared, but it was delayed four times and ultimately cancelled due to domestic turmoil in Japan that resulted in the establishment of the Meiji Restoration in Japan, after which Japanese relations with Korea took a markedly different tone.

== History ==
Starting in 1392 (the establishment of the Joseon dynasty in Korea), many diplomatic missions were sent from the Joseon court to Japan. At least 70 envoys were dispatched to Kyoto and Osaka before the beginning of Japan's Edo period. The formal arrival of serial missions from Korea to Japan were considered important affairs and these events were widely noted and recorded.

Only the largest formal diplomatic missions sent by the Joseon court to Japan were called tongsinsa in Korean. The term tongsinsa may be misused to refer to the practice of unilateral relations, not the international relations of mutual Joseon-Japanese contacts and communication. Up through the end of the 16th century, four embassies to Japan were called "communication envoys" or tongsinsa – in 1428, 1439, 1443 and 1590. After 1607, nine tonsingsa missions were sent to Japan up through 1811.

The unique pattern of these diplomatic exchanges evolved from models established by the Chinese, but without denoting any predetermined relationship to China or to the Chinese world order.

In the Edo period of Japanese history, these diplomatic missions were construed as benefiting the Japanese as legitimizing propaganda for the bakufu (Tokugawa shogunate) and as a key element in an emerging manifestation of Japan's ideal vision of the structure of an international order with Edo as its center.

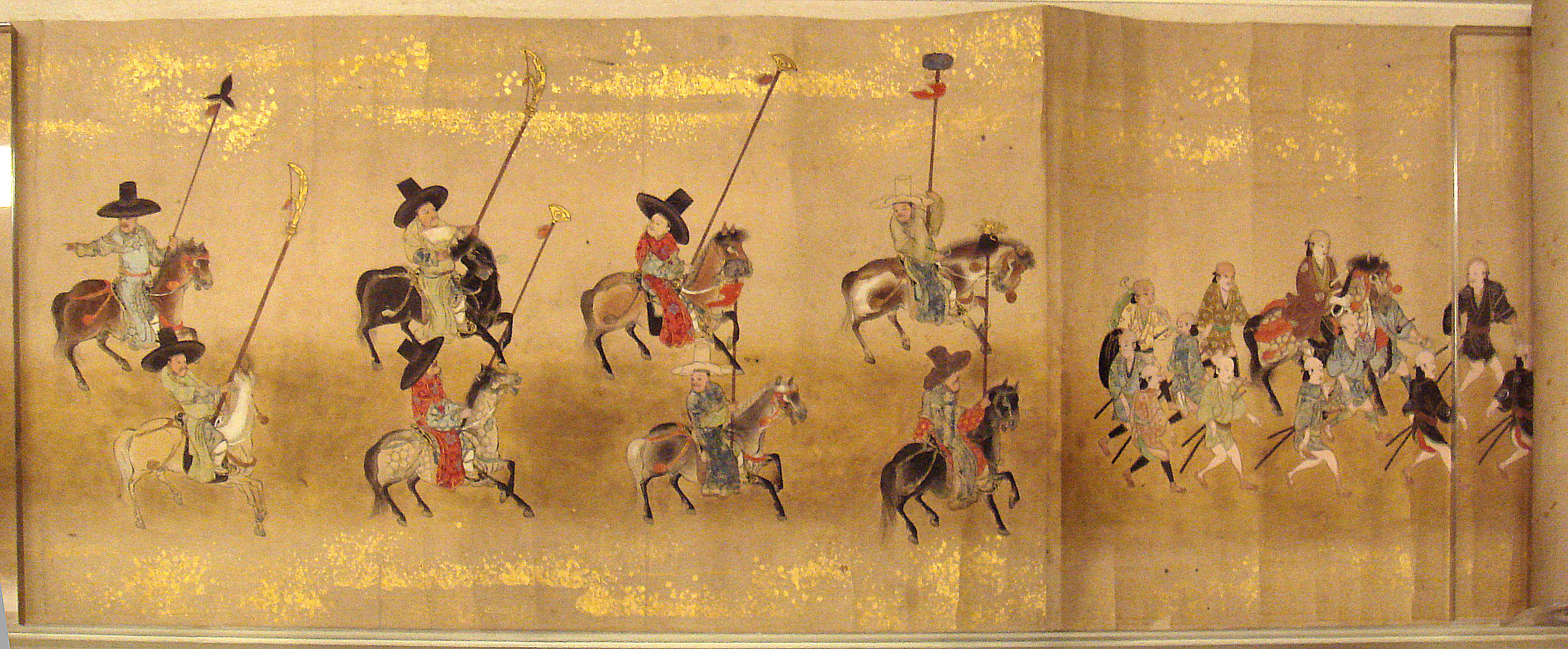
Impression of Joseon Tongsinsa mission in Japan – attributed to a Kanō school artist, circa 1655

After the Japanese invasion of the Korean peninsula (1592–1598) severed diplomatic relations, a new phase of diplomatic relations had to be initiated. The formal embassies were preceded by preliminary negotiations which began in 1600, shortly after news of the Toyotomi defeat at the Battle of Sekigahara was received by the Joseon Court.

As an initial gesture in a process of re-establishing diplomatic relations and as an earnest gesture toward future progress, some Joseon prisoners were released at Tsushima Island. In response, a small group of messengers under the leadership of Yu Jeong were sent to Kyoto to investigate further. With the assistance of Sō Yoshitomo, an audience with Tokugawa Ieyasu was arranged at Fushimi Castle in Kyoto. In 1604, Yu Jeong confirmed the Joseon interest in further developing relations; the Tokugawa shōgun reciprocated by releasing 1,390 prisoners-of-war.

== 15th–16th century diplomatic ventures ==
In the 15th and 16th centuries, the Joseon court labeled four large-scale diplomatic missions to Japan as "communication envoys" or tongsinsa – in 1428, 1439, 1443 and 1590.

In Japan's Muromachi period (1336–1573) and Azuchi–Momoyama period (1568–1603), these Joseon-Japanese diplomatic contacts were considered important events.

Year	Korean monarch	Joseon chief envoy	Japanese shōgun	Official purpose
1428	Sejong	Pak Sŏ-saeng	Ashikaga Yoshinori	Condolences on the death of Yoshimochi, Congratulations on the succession of Yoshinori
1439	Sejong	Ko Tŭkchong	Ashikaga Yoshinori	Neighborly relations, suppression of the waegu (wakō)
1443	Sejong	Pyŏn Hyomun	Ashikaga Yoshimasa	Condolences on the death of Yoshinori, congratulations on the succession of Yoshikatsu
1590	Seonjo	Hwang Yun-gil	Toyotomi Hideyoshi	Congratulations on the unification of Japan by Hideyoshi

== Hideyoshi's invasions ==
Diplomatic relations were severed in 1592 when Japanese armies invaded Joseon on Hideyoshi's orders. The ruptured bilateral relations were not restored immediately after the death of Hideyoshi in 1598, but following Hideyoshi's death the invading forces were withdrawn from Japanese-occupied positions on the Korean Peninsula.

== 17th–19th century diplomatic ventures ==
In the 17th, 18th and 19th centuries, the Joseon leaders sent twelve large-scale delegations to Japan, but not all were construed as "tongsinsa" envoys. The embassies consisted of 400 to 500 delegates; and these missions arguably contributed to the political and cultural development of Japan in addition to the range of ways in which bi-lateral relations were affected.

The 1607, 1617 and 1624 delegations were explicitly identified by the Joseon court as "Reply and Prisoner Repatriation Envoys," which were construed as less formal than a tongsinsa or "communication envoy." The term "tongsinsa" signified that diplomatic relations were under "normalized" conditions, suggesting that these first three delegations after the severance of relations in 1592 were not under "normalized" conditions. It was not until the 1636 delegation that the term tongsinsa was used again by the Joseon court.

Unlike the missions during the early Joseon era, Japan did not dispatch military commanders to greet the later Joseon missions, and only Joseon dispatched missions to Japan. However, this was not because diplomatic relations were unilateral or favored Japan – after Hideyoshi's invasions of Korea, Japanese envoys were forbidden by the Joseon court from traveling to Seoul, and Japanese missions to Korea were halted at the Japanese residence in Busan (during the invasions, the Japanese invading armies had taken the route used previously by Japanese missions to Seoul from Busan); in addition, the cost of dispatching these missions was shouldered in their entirety by the shogunate in Japan (which, in the context of the three "communication" missions that served to normalize relations between Korea and Japan after 1598, seems equitable), which by some estimates equaled the annual budget of the shogunate in cost.

In Japan's Edo period (1603–1868), the Joseon-Japanese diplomatic contacts were considered significant events, with the exception of the 1811 delegation. The Joseon monarch's ambassador and retinue traveled only as far as Tsushima. The representatives of shōgun Ienari met the mission on the island which is located in the middle of the Korea Strait between the Korean Peninsula and Kyushu. After the 1811 mission, another mission was prepared, but it was delayed four times and ultimately cancelled due to domestic turmoil in Japan that resulted in the establishment of the Meiji Restoration in Japan.

Year	Korean monarch	Joseon chief envoy	Japanese shōgun	Official purpose
1636	Injo	Im Gwang	Tokugawa Iemitsu	Celebrating prosperity.
1643	Injo	Yun Sunji	Tokugawa Iemitsu	Celebrating birthday of shōgun Iemitsu.
1655	Hyojong	Jo Hyeong	Tokugawa Ietsuna	Congratulations on succession of shōgun Ietsuna.
1682	Sukjong	Yun Jiwan	Tokugawa Tsunayoshi	Congratulations on succession of shōgun Tsunayoshi.
1711	Sukjong	Jo Tae-eok	Tokugawa Ienobu	Congratulations on succession of shōgun Ienobu.
1719	Sukjong	Hong Chi-jung	Tokugawa Yoshimune	Congratulations on succession of shōgun Yoshimune.
1748	Yeongjo	Hong Gye-hui	Tokugawa Ieshige	Congratulations on succession of shōgun Ieshige.
1764	Yeongjo	Jo Eom	Tokugawa Ieharu	Congratulations on succession of shōgun Ieharu.
1811^{‡}	Sunjo	Kim Igyo	Tokugawa Ienari	Congratulations on succession of shōgun Ienari.

^{‡} The 1811 tongsinsa was incomplete; the delegation did not travel beyond Tsushima, where the Joseon envoys were met by representatives of the shogunate.

== See also ==
- Joseon missions to Imperial China
- Joseon missions to the Ryukyu Kingdom
- Julius Klaproth
- Jean-Pierre Abel-Rémusat
- Tsūkō ichiran, mid-19th century text
- Joseon missions to Japan
