= Joseon missions to China =

The Korean Joseon dynasty (1392–1897) sent numerous diplomatic missions to the Chinese Ming (1368–1644) and Qing (1644–1912) dynasties.

== Joseon diplomacy ==
A series diplomatic ventures illustrate the persistence of Joseon's sadae (serving the great) diplomacy in dealings with China. The chronology of one side in a bilateral relationship stands on its own.

This long-term, strategic policy contrasts with the gyorin (kyorin) (neighborly relations) diplomacy in dealings with Jurchen, Japan, Ryukyu Kingdom, Siam and Java. Gyorin was applied to a multi-national foreign policy. The unique nature of these bilateral diplomatic exchanges evolved from a conceptual framework developed by the Chinese. Gradually, the theoretical models would be modified, mirroring the evolution of a unique relationship.

== Envoys to the Ming court ==
Although the Joseon Dynasty considered 1392 as the foundation of the Joseon kingdom, Imperial China did not immediately acknowledge the new government on the Korean peninsula. In 1401, the Ming court recognized Joseon as a tributary state in its sino-centric schema of foreign relations. In 1403, the Yongle Emperor conveyed a patent and a gold seal to Taejong of Joseon, thus confirming his status and that of his dynasty.

Despite the label "tributary state", China did not interfere in Joseon domestic affairs and diplomacy. Between 1392 and 1450, the Joseon court sent 351 missions to China.

Year	Sender	Joseon chief envoy	Emperor of China	Comments
1592	Seonjo	Yi Deok-hyeong	Wanli	Joseon mission dispatched to Ming China to ask for military support
1597	Seonjo	Yi Su-gwang	Wanli	Yi's encounters with Matteo Ricci provide impetus for the creation of the first Korean language encyclopedia

- 1592 – Confronting Japanese invasion, Joseon sought aid from China.
- 1597 – Yi Su-gwang was the Joseon chief envoy from the Joseon court.

== Envoys to the Qing court ==
In this period, Joseon merchants of Gaeseong and Hanyang competed for profits; and they even accompanied the envoy missions to China in their search for new opportunities for financial gain.

Year	Sender	Joseon chief envoy	Emperor of China	Comments
1795	Jeongjo	–	Qianlong	Offering congratulations; celebrations of the 60th anniversary of Qianlong's reign.
1872	Gojong	Park Gyu-su	Tongzhi	.

- 1795 – The first and only American to be received in the court of the Qianlong Emperor took special note of the reception of Joseon ambassadors, who were received immediately preceding the Dutch embassy in which Andreas Everardus van Braam Houckgeest had a role.
- 1872 – Park Gyu-su was the Joseon chief envoy to the court of the Tongzhi Emperor, offering congratulations.

== Korean Empire ==
In 1897, the Chinese and Korean Empire agreed that the latter would established a permanent embassy in Beijing. The Korean legation was short-lived and only existed from 1903 to 1905, when it was terminated by effect of the Japan–Korea Treaty of 1905.

== See also ==
- Goryeo missions to Imperial China
- Goryeo missions to Japan
- Joseon diplomacy
- Joseon missions to Japan
- Joseon tongsinsa
