= Admiral Inoue =

- Shigeyoshi Inoue (1889-1975), WWII Japanese admiral
- Yoshika Inoue (1845-1929), Russo-Japanese War admiral
