= List of tributary states of China =

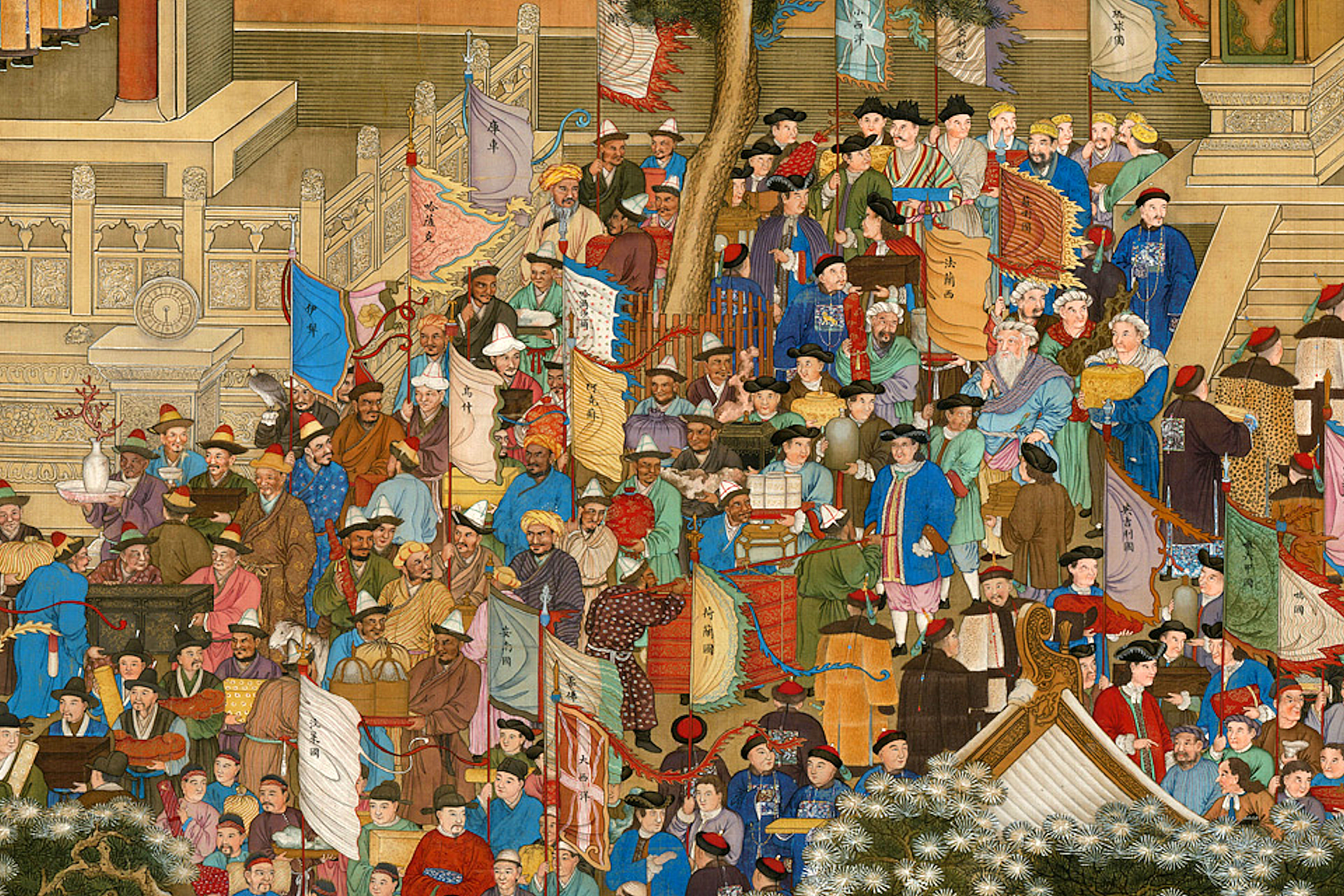
Various foreign delegations visiting the Qianlong Emperor in the Forbidden city in the late 1750s, as depicted by Ten Thousand Nations Coming to Pay Tribute

This is a list of states that paid tribute to the Imperial dynasties of China under the tributary system. It encompassed states in Central Asia, East Asia, North Asia, South Asia, Southeast Asia, and Europe.

== List of tributaries ==
From the 5th century onwards, a status hierarchy was an explicit element of the tributary system in which Korea and Vietnam were ranked higher than others, including Japan, the Ryukyus, Siam and others. All diplomatic and trade missions were construed in the context of a tributary relationship with China, including:

- Afghanistan
  - Kabul
- Bhutan
- Brunei (文萊)
  - Borneo
  - Poni (渤泥)
- Burma (Myanmar)
  - Konbaung
- Cambodia
  - Kingdom of Funan
  - Zhenla
- Central Asia
  - Kokand
- Ceylon (Sri Lanka)
- Champa (also Chiêm Thành/占城, Lin-yi/ 林邑)
- Indonesia
  - Palembang (舊港)
  - Majapahit (滿者伯夷)
  - Srivijaya (三佛齊，室利佛逝)
- Japan
  - Wa (Japan) (16 tribute missions)
  - Asuka Japan (5 tribute missions)
  - Nara/Heian Japan (16 tribute missions)
  - Ashikaga shogunate (20 tribute missions)
- Korea
  - Goguryeo (173 tribute missions)
  - Baekje (45 tribute missions)
  - Silla (19 tribute missions)
  - Unified Silla (63 tribute missions in 8th century)
  - Goryeo (The envoy missions)
  - Joseon (826 tribute missions)
- Ladakh
- Laos (老挝)
  - Lan Xang
- Malaysia
  - Tanah Merah Kingdom
  - Kedah Kingdom
  - Kelantan
  - Langkasuka (狼牙脩)
  - Malacca (满剌加 / 馬六甲) 拜里米苏拉
  - Melayu (末罗瑜 / 末罗游)
- Nepal
- Philippines
  - Butuan (蒲端)
  - Sanmalan (三麻蘭)
  - Sulu
- Ryukyus
  - Hokuzan
  - Chūzan
  - Nanzan
  - Okinawa
- Siam (Thailand)
  - Ayutthaya
  - Chiang Mai
- Sikkim (锡金)
- Tibet
- Vietnam
  - Vạn Xuân (萬春, 野能)
  - Đại Việt (also Dai Co Viet, Dai Ngu, 大越, 大瞿越, 大虞) (Ngô Dynasty 吳朝, Đinh Dynasty 丁朝, Prior Lê Dynasty 前黎朝, Lý Dynasty 李朝, Trần Dynasty 陳朝, Hồ Dynasty 胡朝, Later Lê Dynasty 後黎朝, Mạc Dynasty 莫朝)

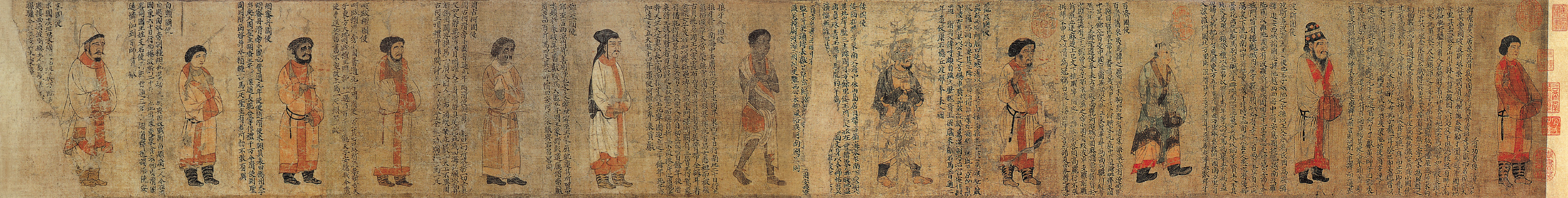
The Portraits of Periodical Offering of Liang. 6th-century painting in National Museum of China. Ambassadors from right to left: Uar (Hephthalites); Persia; Baekje (Korea); Qiuci; Wo (Japan); Langkasuka (in present-day Malaysia); Dengzhi (鄧至) (Qiang) Ngawa; Zhouguke (周古柯), Hebatan (呵跋檀), Humidan (胡密丹), Baiti (白題, of similar Hephthalite people), who dwell close to Hephthalite; Mo (Qiemo).

- Taiwan(1661-1683).

== By dynasty ==
=== Western Han ===
- Internal vassals (206 BC - ?) – Upon the founding of the dynasty, the first emperor awarded up to one-half of territory of Han as fiefdoms to various relatives, who ruled as princes. These fiefdoms collected their own taxes and established their own laws and were not directly administered by imperial government. Consolidation and centralization by succeeding emperors increased imperial controls, gradually dissolving the princedoms. During the period of Three kingdoms, Japan's king also sent tribute to Cao Rui stating about his status as a vassal to the Rui.
- Dayuan (102 BC) – Kingdom located in the Fergana Valley. Hearing tales of their high-quality horses, which would be of great utility in combatting the Xiongnu, Emperor Wu of Han dispatched an expedition to acquire their submission and the horses. The first expedition of 3,000 was woefully undermanned, but the second, numbering 100,000 besieged the capital, bringing them into submission after negotiations. The expedition returned with 10,000 horses along with a promise to pay an annual tribute in horses.
- Dian Kingdom (109 BC) – A kingdom located in modern-day Yunnan province. Brought into subjugation by Emperor Wu of Han, who annexed the kingdom into an imperial commandery but allowed local rulers to remain in power.
- Jushi (108 BC) – City-state in modern-day Turpan. Brought into submission by an imperial expedition dispatched by Emperor Wu of Han.
- Loulan (108 BC) – Located along the northeastern edge of the Taklamakan Desert in modern-day Xinjiang province. Brought into submission by an imperial expedition dispatched by Emperor Wu of Han.
- Minyue (138 BC - ?) – A Baiyue people situated in modern-day Fujian province. After an attack by the Minyue people, Emperor Wu of Han launched a massive expedition, and forced their entire population to relocate within imperial borders.
- Nanyue (211 BC - 111 BC) – A kingdom situated today's northern Vietnam, and the provinces of Guangdong and Guangxi founded by a former Chinese general, Zhao Tuo. Under Zhao Tuo it paid nominal tribute to Han but his successors lost more and more power. After a coup d'état against the king, Han directly conquered the kingdom and directly administered it from then on.
- Xiongnu (53 BC - 10) – A nomadic confederation/empire in Central Asia and modern day Mongolia and extending their control to territories as far as Siberia, western Manchuria, the areas along the Caspian Sea, and modern day Chinese provinces of Inner Mongolia, Gansu and Xinjiang. They entered tributary relations with the Han after several defeats, territorial losses, and internal conflicts. Tributary relationships terminated as a result of diplomatic fumblings during the reign of Wang Mang. Xinjiang passed to Chinese control after their defeat.
- Wusun (105 BC - ?) – Central Asian people. Bitter enemies with the Xiongnu, they entered a military alliance with the Han. In 53 BC, the kingdom split into two following a succession dispute. Both continued to recognize Han sovereignty and remained faithful vassals.

=== Xin ===
During Wang Mang's reign, relations with many of the empire's allies and tributaries deteriorated, due in large part to Wang Mang's arrogance and inept diplomacy.

=== Eastern Han ===
- Khotan – King Guangde of Khotan submitted to the Han dynasty in 73 AD. In 129: Fangqian, the king of Khotan, sent an envoy to offer tribute to Han. The Emperor pardoned the crime of the king of Khotan, ordering him to hand back the kingdom of Keriya. Fangqian refused. Two years later Fangqian sent one of his sons to serve and offer tribute at the Chinese Imperial Palace.
- Southern Xiongnu (50 - 220) – The Xiongnu split into northern and southern factions. The southern Xiongnu brought themselves into tributary relations with the Han. They were resettled along with large numbers of Chinese immigrants in frontier regions. Economically dependent on Han, they were obliged to provide military services under a tightened tributary system with greater direct imperial supervision.

=== Jin, Northern and Southern, Tang ===
In the 5th century the Wa (Japan during the Kofun period) sent five tributes to the Jin and to the Liu Song dynasty and the emperors promoted the five kings to the title like Supreme Military Commander of the Six States of Wa, Silla, Mimana, Gaya, Jinhan and Mahan.

According to the Xīn Táng shū the kingdom of Zhēnlà had conquered different principalities in Northwestern Cambodia after the end of the Yǒnghuī (永徽) era (i.e. after 31 January 656), which previously (in 638/39) paid tribute to China.

The Chinese retaliated against Cham which was raiding the Rinan coast around 430s-440s by seizing Qusu, and then plundering the capital of the Cham around Huế. Around 100,000 jin in gold was the amount of plunder. Lin Yi then paid 10,000 jin in gold, 100,000 jin in silver, and 300,000 jin in copper in 445 as tribute to China. The final tribute paid to China from Lin Yi was in 749, among the items were 100 strings of pearls, 30 jin gharuwood, baidi, and 20 elephants.

Enslaved people from tributary countries were sent to Tang China by various groups, the Cambodians sent albinos, the Uyghurs sent Turkic Karluks, the Japanese sent Ainu, and Göktürk (Tujue) and Tibetan girls were also sent to China. Prisoners captured from Liaodong, Korea, and Japan were sent as tribute to China from Balhae. Tang dynasty China received 11 Japanese girl dancers as tribute from Balhae in 777.

=== Song ===
The Song dynasty received 302 tribute missions from other countries. Vietnamese missions consisted of 45 of them, another 56 were from Champa. More tribute was sent by Champa in order to curry favor from China against Vietnam. Champa brought as tribute Champa rice, a fast-growing rice strain, to China, which massively increased Chinese yields of rice.

In 969 the son of King Li Shengtian named Zongchang sent a tribute mission to China. According to Chinese accounts, the King of Khotan offered to send in tribute to the Chinese court a dancing elephant captured from Kashgar in 970.

=== Yuan ===
The Mongols extracted tribute from throughout their empire. From Goryeo, they received gold, silver, cloth, grain, ginseng, and falcons. The tribute payments were a burden on Goryeo and subjugated polities in the empire. As with all parts of the Mongol Empire, Goryeo provided palace women, eunuchs, Buddhist monks, and other personnel to the Mongols.

Just as Korean women entered the Yuan court, the Korean Koryo kingdom also saw the entry of Mongol women. Great power was attained by some of the Korean women who entered the Yuan court. One example is the Empress Ki (Qi) and her eunuch Bak Bulhwa when they attempted a major coup of Northern China and Koryo. King Ch'ungson (1309–1313) married two Mongol women, Princess Botasirin and a non-royal woman named Yesujin. She gave birth to a son and had a posthumous title of "virtuous concubine". In addition 1324, the Yuan court sent a Mongol princess of Wei named Jintong to the Koryo King Ch'ungsug.

The entry of Korean women into the Yuan court was reciprocated by the entry of Yuan princesses into the Goryeo court, and this affected relations between Korea and the Yuan. Marriages between the imperial family of Yuan existed between certain states. These included the Onggirat tribe, Idug-qut's Uighur tribe, the Oirat tribe, and the Koryo (Korean) royal family.

=== Ming ===
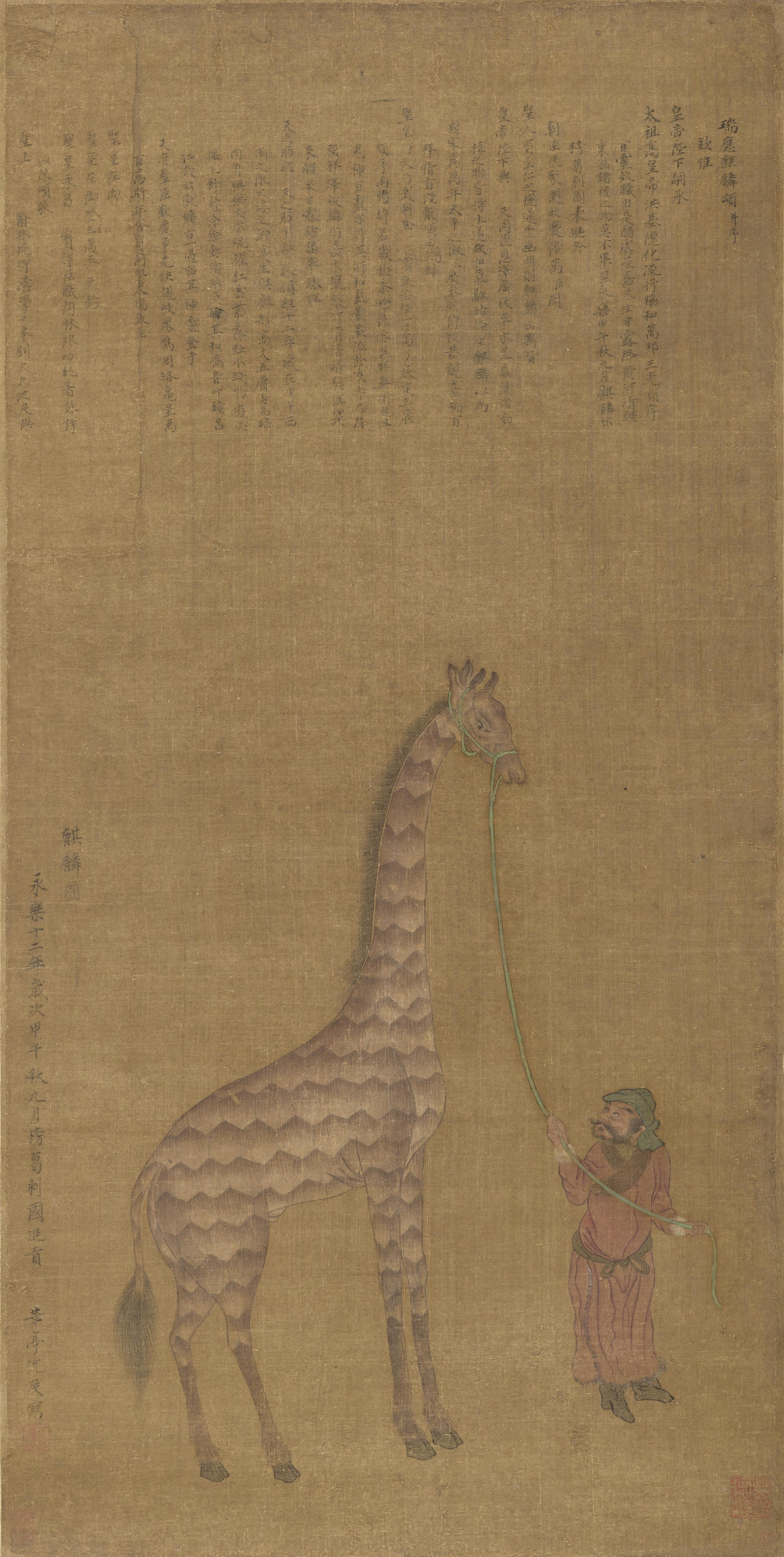
A Ming-era painting of a tribute giraffe from Bengal, which was thought to be a Qilin by court officials

Under the Ming dynasty, countries that wanted to have any form of relationship with China, political, economic or otherwise, had to enter the tribute system. As a result, tribute was often paid for opportunistic reasons rather than as a serious gesture of allegiance to the Chinese emperor, and the mere fact that tribute was paid may not be understood in a way that China had political leverage over its tributary. Also some tribute missions may just have been up by ingenious traders. A number of countries only paid tribute once, as a result of Zheng He's expeditions. As of 1587, in Chinese sources the following countries are listed to have paid tribute to the Ming emperors:

The Hongwu Emperor started tributary relations in 1368, emissaries being sent to countries like Korea, Vietnam, Champa, Japan, of which Korea, Vietnam, and Champa sent back tribute in 1369. During Hongwu's rule, Liuch'iu sent 20, Korea sent 20, Champa sent 19, and Vietnam sent 14 tribute missions. The tribute system was an economically profitable form of government trade, and Korea requested and successfully increased the number of tributes sent to Ming from once every three years to three times each year starting in 1400, and eventually four times each year starting in 1531.

The 1471 Vietnamese invasion of Champa and Ming Turpan Border Wars were either started by or marked by disruptions in the tribute system.

Tribute in the form of servants, eunuchs, and virgin girls came from: Ming's various ethnic-minority tribes, tribes on the Mongolian Plateau, Korea, Vietnam, Cambodia, Central Asia, Siam, Champa, and Okinawa.

There were Korean, Jurchen, Mongol, Central Asian, and Vietnamese eunuchs under the Yongle Emperor, including Mongol eunuchs who served him while he was the Prince of Yan. In 1381, Muslim and Mongol eunuchs were captured from Yunnan, and possibly among them was the great Ming maritime explorer Zheng He. Vietnamese eunuchs like Ruan Lang, Ruan An, Fan Hong, Chen Wu, and Wang Jin were sent by Zhang Fu to the Ming.

During Ming's early contentious relations with Joseon, when there were disputes such as competition for influence over the Jurchens in Manchuria, Korean officials were even flogged by Korean-born Ming eunuch ambassadors, when their demands were not met. Some of the ambassadors were arrogant, such as Sin Kwi-saeng who, in 1398, got drunk and brandished a knife at a dinner in the presence of the king. Sino-Korean relations later became amiable, and Korean envoys' seating arrangement in the Ming court was always the highest among the tributaries. A total of 198 eunuchs were sent from Korea to Ming.

On 30 Jan 1406, the Ming Yongle Emperor expressed horror when the Ryukyuans castrated some of their own children to become eunuchs in order to give them to Yongle. Yongle said that the boys who were castrated were innocent and didn't deserve castration, and he returned the boys to Ryukyu and instructed them not to send eunuchs again.

Joseon sent a total of 114 women to the Ming dynasty, consisting of 16 virgin girls, accompanied by 48 female servants, 42 cooks (執饌女), and 8 musical performers (歌舞女). The women were sent to the Yongle and Xuande emperors in a total of 7 missions between 1408 and 1433. Xuande was the last Ming emperor to receive human tribute from Korea. with his death in 1435, 53 Korean women were repatriated. There was much speculation that the Yongle Emperor's real mother was a Korean or Mongolian concubine. Relations between Ming China and Joseon Korea improved dramatically and became much more amicable and mutually profitable during Yongle's reign. Yongle and Xuande were said to have a penchant for Korean cuisine and women.

An anti pig slaughter edict led to speculation that the Zhengde Emperor adopted Islam, due to his use of Muslim eunuchs who commissioned the production of porcelain with Persian and Arabic inscriptions in white and blue color. Muslim eunuchs contributed money in 1496 to repairing Niujie Mosque. Central Asian women were provided to the Zhengde Emperor by a Muslim guard and Sayyid Hussein from Hami. The guard was Yu Yung and the women were Uighur.

It is unknown who really was behind the anti-pig slaughter edict. The speculation of him becoming a Muslim is remembered alongside his excessive and debauched behavior along with his concubines of foreign origin. Muslim Central Asian girls were favored by Zhengde, with Korean girls being favored by Xuande. A Uighur concubine was kept by Zhengde. Uighur and Mongol women were favored by the Zhengde emperor.

=== Qing ===
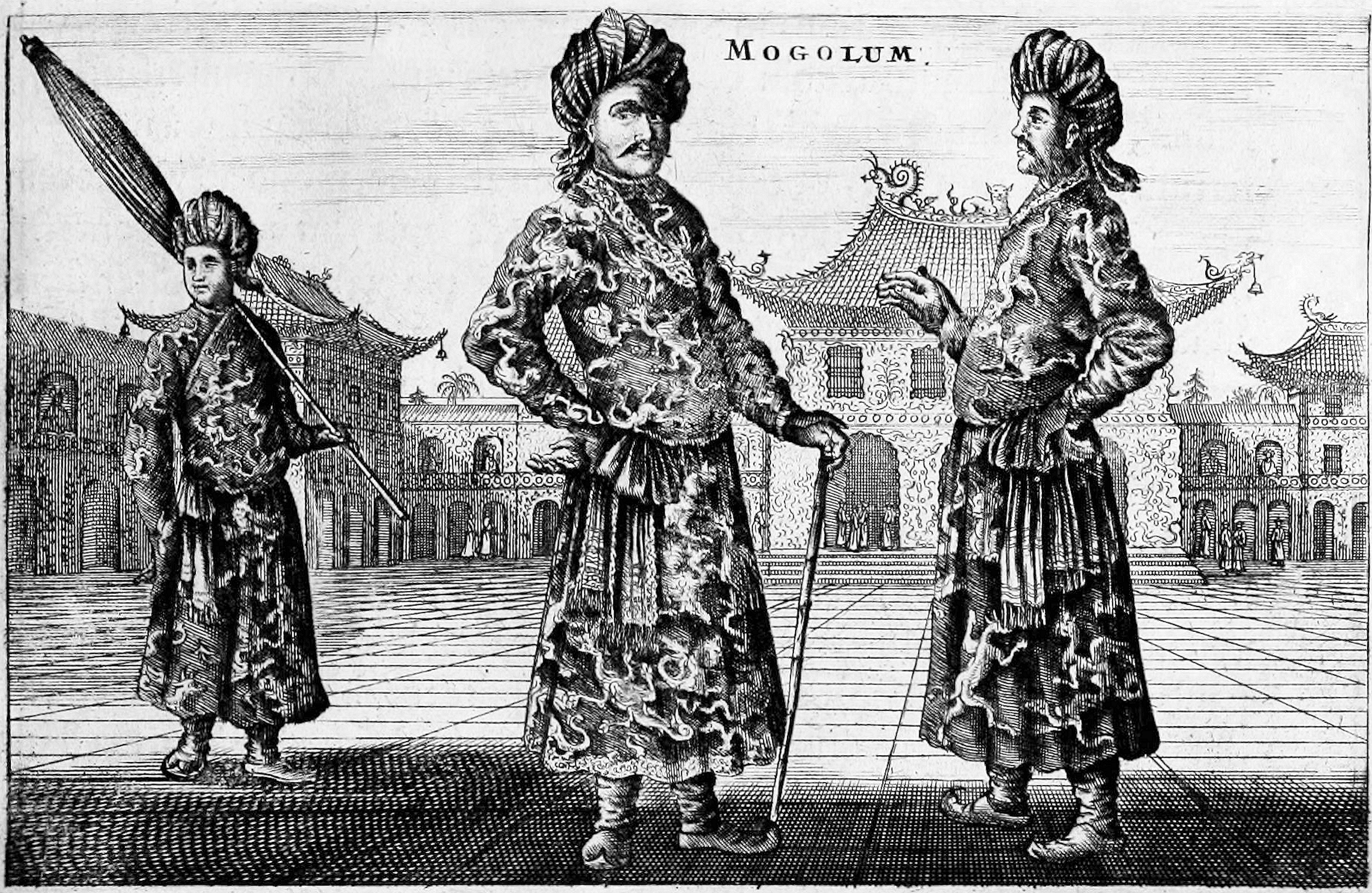
"Moghul embassy", seen by the Dutch visitors in Beijing in 1656. According to Lach & Kley (1993), modern historians (namely, Luciano Petech) think that the emissaries portrayed had actually come from Turfan, and not all the way from the Moghul India.

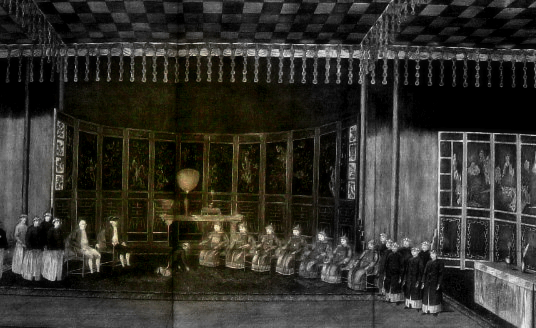
The Dutch embassy before the Court and the Qianlong Emperor in 1795. The Dutch embassy was the last European embassy sent to China under the tributary system.

This list covers states that sent tribute between 1662 and 1875, and were not covered under the Lifan Yuan. Therefore, Tibet or the Khalkha are not included, although they did send tribute in the period given:

- Badakhshan
- Hunza (1761)
- Joseon (Korea) (three or four times a year; 435 embassies, 1637-1881)
- Netherlands (1663(?), 1667, 1686, and 1795).
- Sulu Sultanate (1726,)

After the Second Manchu Invasion of Korea, Joseon Korea was forced to give several of their royal princesses as concubines to the Qing Manchu regent Prince Dorgon. In 1650, Dorgon married the Korean Princess Uisun (義順). The Princess' name in Korean was Uisun, she was Prince Yi Kaeyoon's (Kumrimgoon) daughter. Dorgon married two Korean princesses at Lianshan.

The tribute system did not dissolve in 1875, but tribute embassies became less frequent and regular: twelve more Korean embassies until 1894, one more (abortive) from Liuqiu in 1877, three more from Vietnam, and four from Nepal, the last one in 1908.

In 1886, after Britain took over Burma, they maintained the sending of tribute to China, putting themselves in a lower status than in their previous relations. It was agreed in the Burma convention in 1886 that China would recognize Britain's occupation of Upper Burma while Britain continued the Burmese payment of tribute every ten years to Peking.

== See also ==
- Chinese expansionism
- Chinese nationalism
- Emperor at home, king abroad
- Foreign relations of imperial China
  - Foreign relations of China
- Greater China
- History of China#Imperial China
- Ten Thousand Nations Coming to Pay Tribute
- Tributary system of China
- List of recipients of tribute from China
- Silk Road
- Sinocentrism
- Zheng He
- Adoption of Chinese literary culture

General:

- Suzerainty
- Tributary state
- Tribute
