= Japanese corvette Seiki =

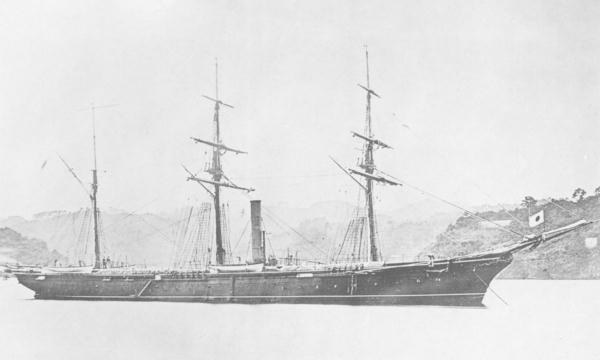
- Seiki in 1878

History
- Name: Seiki
- Ordered: 1873 Fiscal Year
- Builder: Yokosuka Naval Arsenal, Japan
- Laid down: 20 June 1873
- Launched: 5 May 1875
- Commissioned: 21 June 1876
- Stricken: 7 December 1888
- Fate: Sank 10 December 1888

General characteristics
- Displacement: 897 long tons (911 t)
- Length: 62.17 m (204 ft 0 in)
- Beam: 9.14 m (30 ft 0 in)
- Draft: 3.96 m (13 ft 0 in)
- Propulsion: horizontally mounted reciprocating steam engine; , 443 hp (330 kW); 2 boilers, 1 shaft
- Sail plan: bark-rigged sloop
- Speed: 9.5 knots (10.9 mph; 17.6 km/h)
- Complement: 167
- Armament: 1 × 150 mm (5.9 in) Krupp breech-loading gun; 1 × Krupp 120 mm (4.7 in) breech-loading gun; 1 × Armstrong 6-pdr gun; 1 × 80 mm (3.1 in) triple Nordenfelt gun

Seiki (清輝, Pure Brightness) was a screw sloop in the early Imperial Japanese Navy, and was the first vessel built by the Yokosuka Naval Arsenal after its acquisition by the Meiji government. It was one of the first domestically produced warships in Japan.

== Background ==
Seiki was designed as a wooden-hulled three-masted bark-rigged sloop with a coal-fired triple-expansion reciprocating steam engine with three cylinders and two cylindrical boilers driving a single screw. Her hull was made largely of native keyaki wood. She was laid down at Yokosuka Naval Arsenal on 20 June 1873 under the direction of Léonce Verny, a French naval engineer initially hired by the Tokugawa shogunate, who stayed on as a foreign advisor to the early Meiji government as chief administrator and constructor of the Yokosuka Naval Arsenal. She was launched on 5 May 1875, with Emperor Meiji personally attending the launching ceremony. She was commissioned into the Imperial Japanese Navy on 21 June 1876.

== Operational history ==
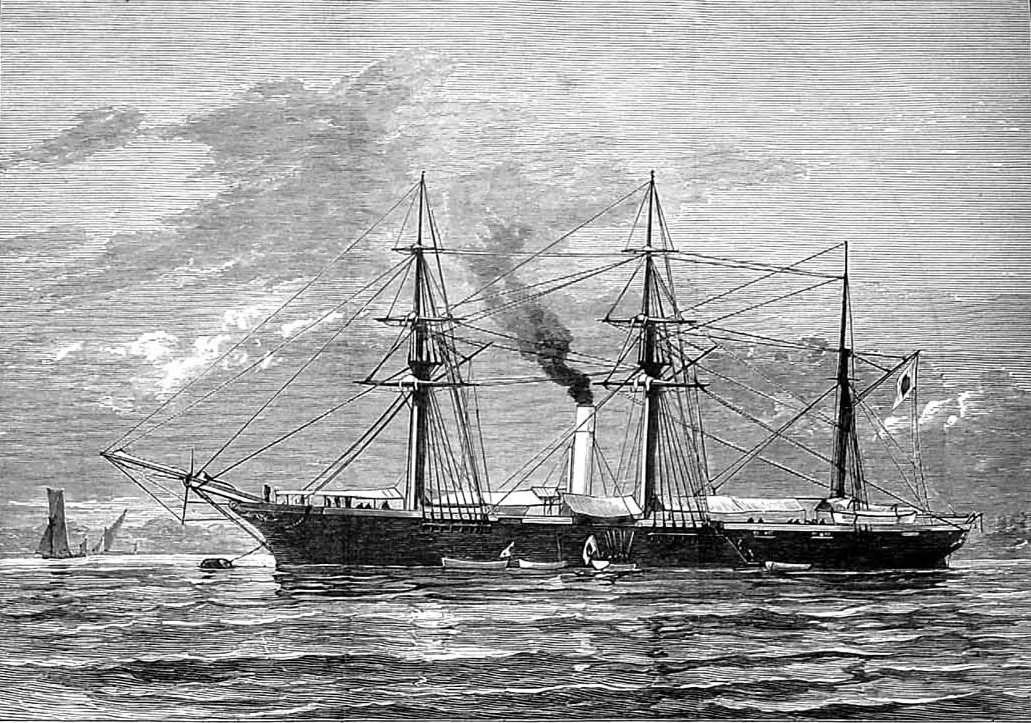
Japanese Gun-boat Seiki, in 1878

Lieutenant Commander Inoue Yoshika oversaw the completion of Seiki and was both her chief outfitting officer and first captain. Soon after completion, in November 1878, Inoue took Seiki to Europe, marking the first long-distance voyage by a domestically produced Japanese warship. Along the way, Seiki passed through the Suez Canal and made port calls at Constantinople and London, among other places, and was hailed in the western press as the first Japanese-built and Japanese-crewed warship to make such a voyage. Inoue successfully completed the mission, returning to Japan in August 1879. At around 0200 hours on 7 December 1888, Seiki ran aground in Suruga Bay near the mouth of the Fuji River at position (35°07′N 138°40′E). She was unable to free herself, and broke up and sank at 1400 hours on 10 December 1888 .

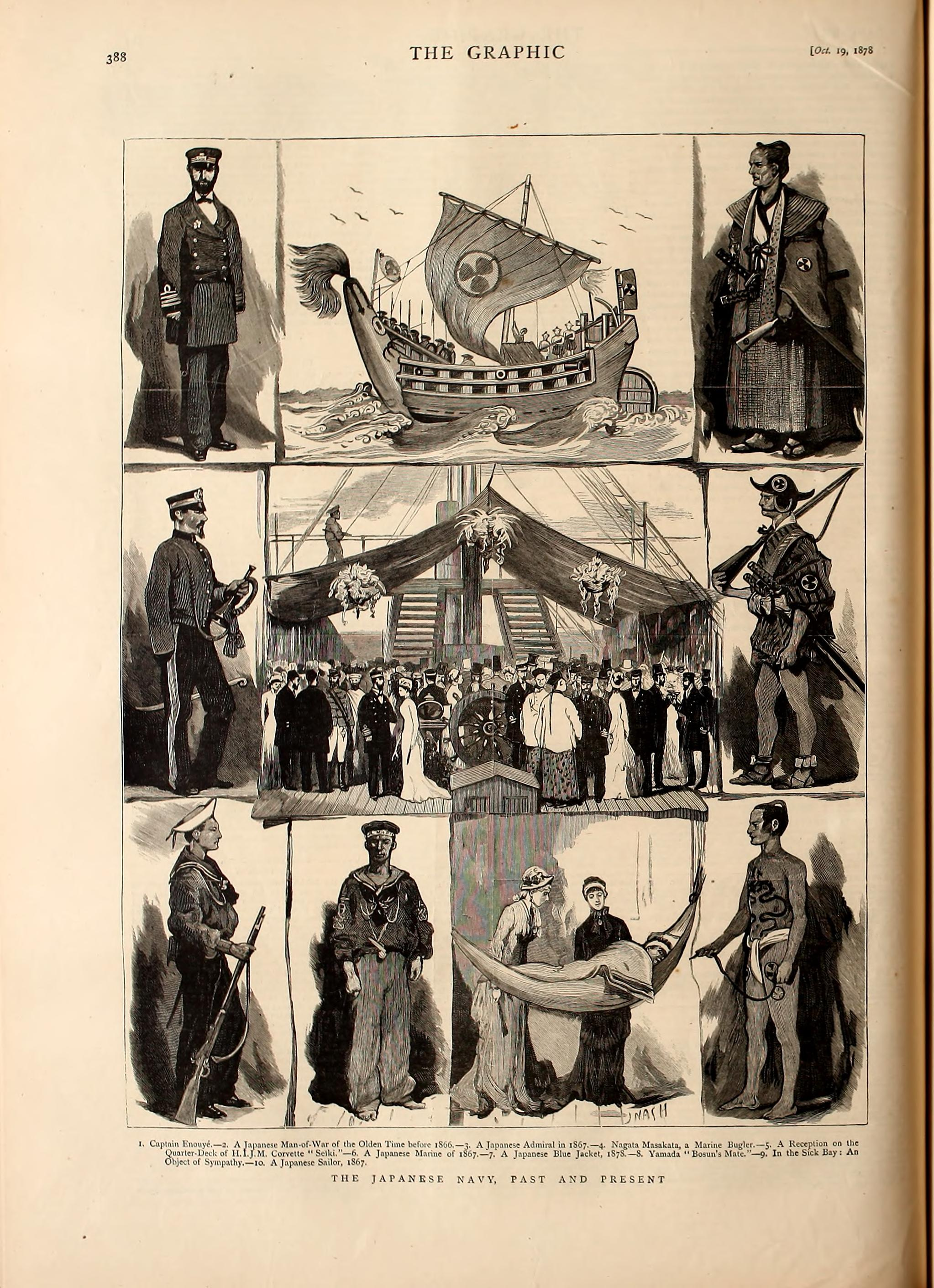
The Seiki, Captain Inoue, scenes from the ship, some of the crew.
