= Japan–Korea Treaty of 1876 =

Treaty forcing Korea to open up to Japan

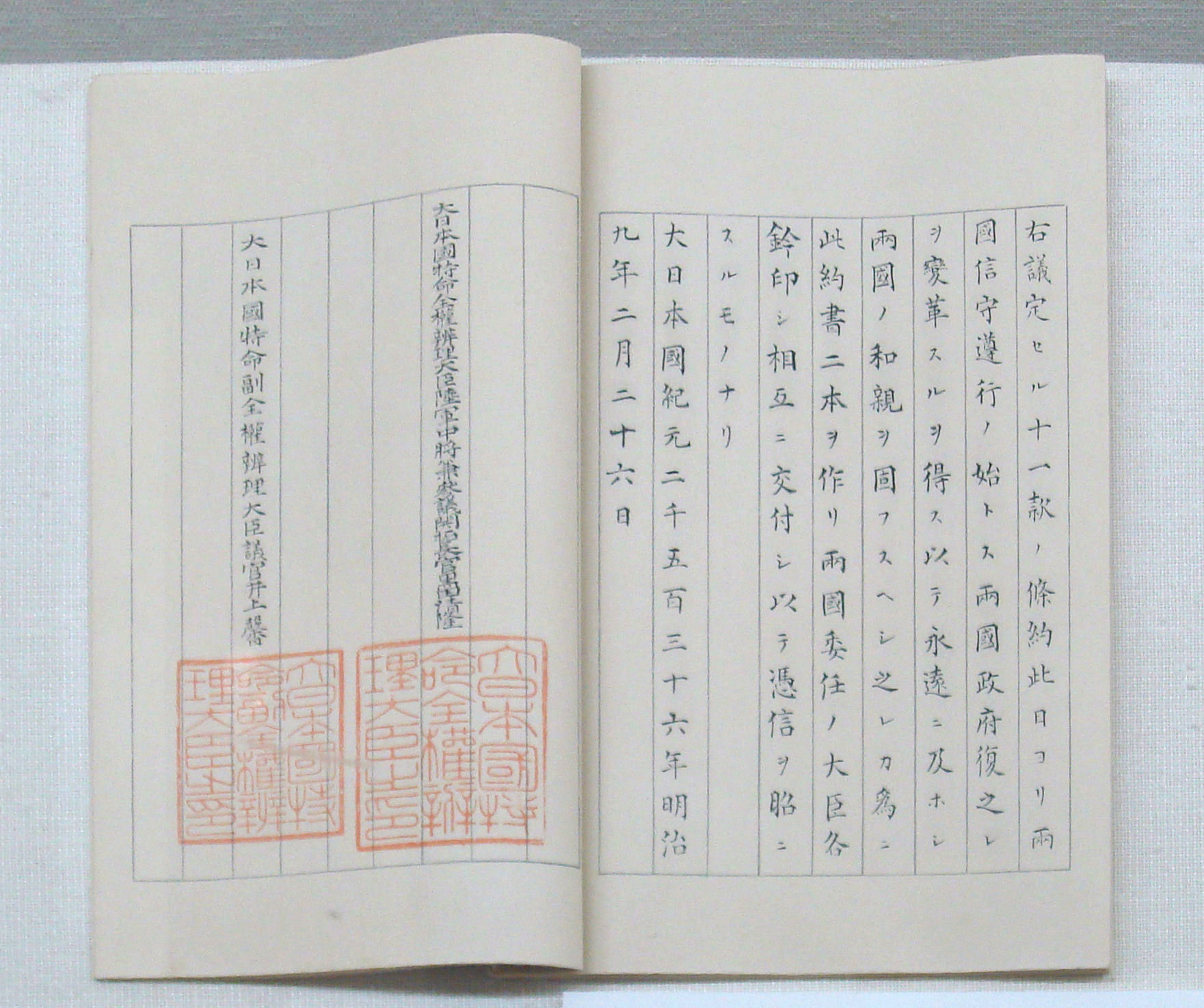
- The treaty on display in Japan (2011)
- Signed: February 26, 1876; 150 years ago
- Effective: February 26, 1876; 150 years ago
- Signatories: Empire of Japan; Kingdom of Joseon

Japan-Korea Treaty of Amity

Japanese name
- Kanji: 日朝修好条規
- Hiragana: にっちょうしゅうこうじょうき
Transcriptions
- Revised Hepburn: Nitchō-shūkōjōki

Korean name
- Hangul: 강화도 조약
- Hanja: 江華島條約
Transcriptions
- Revised Romanization: Ganghwado Joyak
- McCune–Reischauer: Kanghwado Choyak

The Japan–Korea Treaty of 1876 (also known as the Japan–Korea Treaty of Amity in Japan and the Treaty of Ganghwa Island in Korea) was made between representatives of the Empire of Japan and the Kingdom of Joseon in 1876. Negotiations were concluded on February 26, 1876.

In Korea, Heungseon Daewongun, who instituted a policy of increased isolationism against the European powers, was forced into retirement by his son King Gojong and Gojong's wife, Empress Myeongseong. France and the United States had already made several unsuccessful attempts to begin commerce with the Joseon dynasty during the Daewongun's era. However, after Daewongun was removed from power, many new officials took power who supported the idea of opening commerce with foreigners.

During the political instability in Korea, Japan developed a plan to open and exert influence on Korea before a European power could. In 1875, the plan was put into action: the Un'yō, a small Japanese warship, was dispatched to present a show of force and survey coastal waters without Korean permission.

== Background ==
=== Ascendancy of Daewongun ===
In January 1864, King Cheoljong died without an heir, and Gojong ascended the throne at the age of 12. However, King Gojong was too young, and the new king's father, Yi Ha-ŭng, became the Daewongun or lord of the great court and ruled Korea in his son's name. Originally, the term Daewongun referred to any person who was not actually the king but whose son took the throne. The Daewongun initiated reforms to strengthen the monarchy at the expense of the yangban (aristocrat) class.

Even before the 19th century, the Koreans had maintained diplomatic relations only with its suzerain, China, and with neighboring Japan. Foreign trade was mainly limited to China and was conducted at designated locations along the China–Korea border, and with Japan through the waegwan in Pusan. By the mid-19th century, Westerners had come to refer to Korea as the Hermit Kingdom. The Daewongun was determined to continue Korea's traditional isolationist policy and to purge the kingdom of any foreign ideas that had infiltrated the nation. The disastrous events occurring in China, including the First (1839–1842) and Second Opium Wars (1856–1860), reinforced his determination to isolate Korea from the rest of the world.

=== Western encroachment ===
From the early 19th century onwards, Western vessels began to make frequent appearances in Korean waters, surveying sea routes and seeking trade. The Korean government was extremely wary of such vessels, which they referred to as the "strange-looking ships". In June 1832, Lord Amherst, an East Indiaman of the East India Company, arrived off the coast of Hwanghae Province seeking trade but was turned away. 13 years later, the 26-gun corvette HMS Samarang surveyed the coast of Jeju Island and Jeolla Province in June 1845. In the following month, the Korean government filed a protest with British authorities in Guangzhou through the Chinese government. In June 1846, three French warships dropped anchor off the coast of Chungcheong Province and conveyed a letter protesting the persecution of Catholics in Korea. Two armed Russian vessels sailed along the eastern coast of Hamgyong Province in April 1854, killing or injuring several Koreans they encountered. The incident prompted the Korean government to issue a ban forbidding the province's inhabitants from having any contact with foreign vessels.

In January and July 1866, ships owned by the German businessman Ernst Oppert appeared off the coast of Chungcheong Province seeking trade but were rebuffed. In August 1866, the American merchantmen General Sherman appeared off the coast of Pyongan Province, steaming along the Taedong River to the provincial capital of Pyongyang, and asked permission to trade. Local officials refused to enter into trade talks and demanded the ship's departure. A Korean official was then taken hostage aboard General Sherman, whose crew fired at Korean officials and civilians onshore, killing seven; the crew then landed ashore and plundered the town. The provincial governor, Pak Kyusu, then ordered his forces to destroy the ship; during the Korean attack, General Sherman ran aground on a sandbar and Pak's forces burned the ship and killed her entire crew. In 1866, after the execution of several of French missionaries and Korean Catholics, the French launched an unsuccessful punitive expedition against Korea. In 1871, the Americans launched a victorious expedition to Korea. Despite these incidents, the Korean government continued to adhere to isolationism and refused to open up the country.

=== Japanese attempts to establish relations with Korea ===
During the Edo period, Japan's relations and trade with Korea were conducted through intermediaries with the Sō family in Tsushima. A Japanese outpost called the waegwan was allowed to be maintained in Tongnae near Pusan. The traders were confined to the outpost and no Japanese were allowed to travel to the Korean capital at Seoul. During the aftermath of the Meiji restoration in late 1868, a member of the Sō daimyō informed the Korean authorities that a new government had been established and that an envoy would be sent from Japan.

In 1869, the envoy from the Meiji government arrived in Korea and carried a letter requesting the establishment of a goodwill mission between the two countries. It contained the seal of the Meiji government rather than the seals that had been authorized for use by the Korean Court for the Sō family. It also used the character ko (皇) rather than taikun (大君) to refer to the Japanese emperor. The Koreans used that character to refer only to the Chinese emperor, and for them, it implied the Japanese ruler's ceremonial superiority to the Korean monarch which would make the Korean monarch a vassal or subject of the Japanese ruler. The Japanese were, however, just reacting to their domestic political situation in which the shogun had been replaced by the emperor. The Koreans remained in the Sinocentric world in which China was at the center of interstate relations and as a result refused to receive the envoy. The bureau of foreign affairs wanted to change those arrangements to one based on modern state-to-state relations.

== Ganghwa incident ==
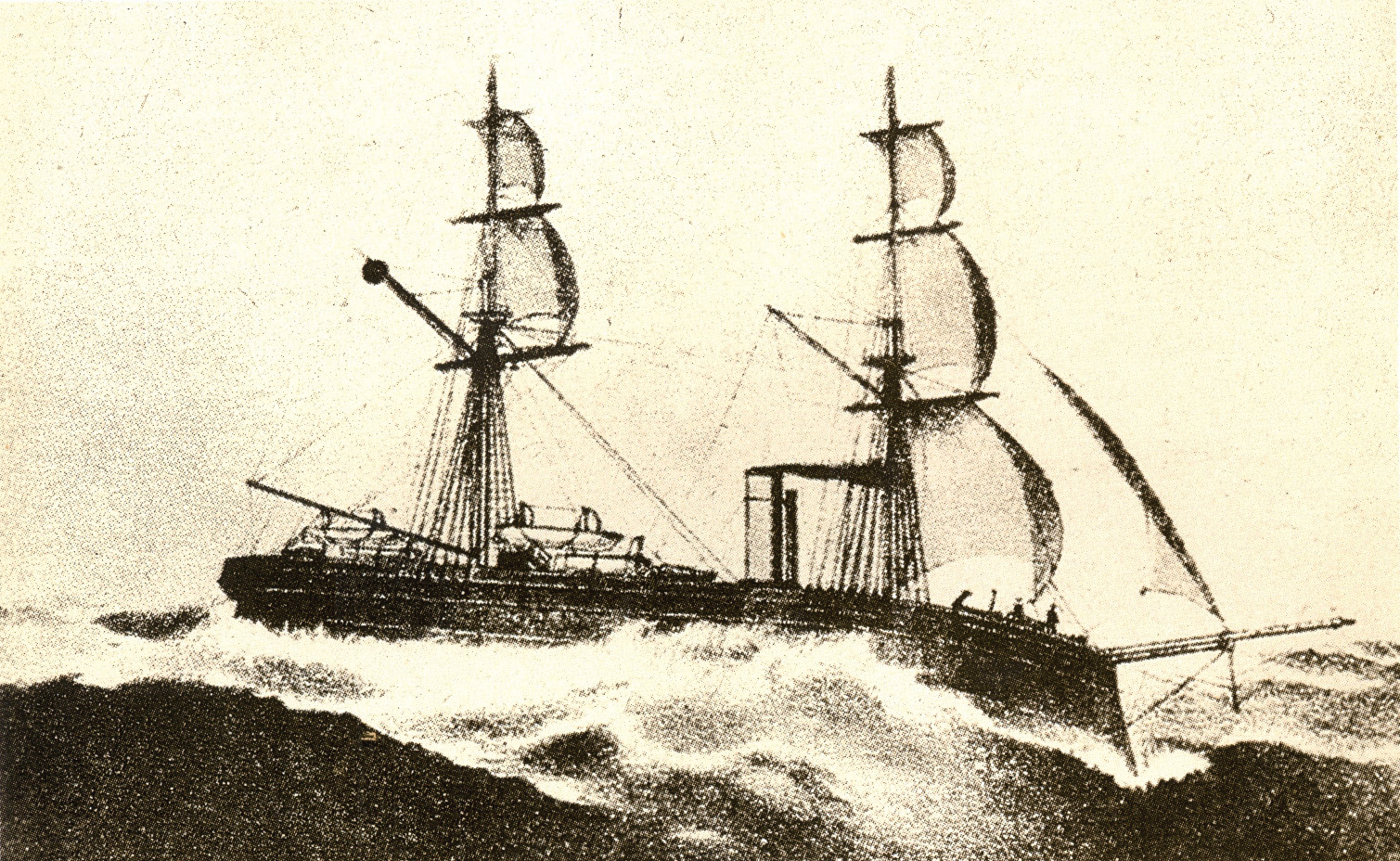
The Japanese gunboat Un'yō

On the morning of September 20, 1875, the Japanese gunboat Un'yō began surveying the Western coast of Korea. The ship reached Ganghwa Island, which had been a site of violent confrontations between the Koreans and foreign forces during the previous decade. The memories of those confrontations were very fresh, and there was little question that the Korean garrison would shoot at any approaching foreign ship. Nonetheless, Commander Inoue ordered a small boat to launch and put ashore a party on Kanghwa Island to request water and provisions.

The Korean forts opened fire. The Un'yō brought its superior firepower to bear and silenced the Korean guns. After bombarding the Korean fortifications, the shore party torched several houses on the island and exchanged fire with Korean troops. The Japanese were armed with modern rifles and quickly routed the Koreans who carried matchlock muskets. Thirty-five Korean soldiers were left dead. The Un'yo then attacked another Korean fort on Yeongjong Island and withdrew back to Japan.

News of the incident only reached the Japanese government eight days later on September 28, and the following day the government decided to dispatch warships to Pusan to protect Japanese residents there. There were also debates within the Japanese government as to whether or not to send a mission to Korea to settle the incident.

== Treaty provisions ==
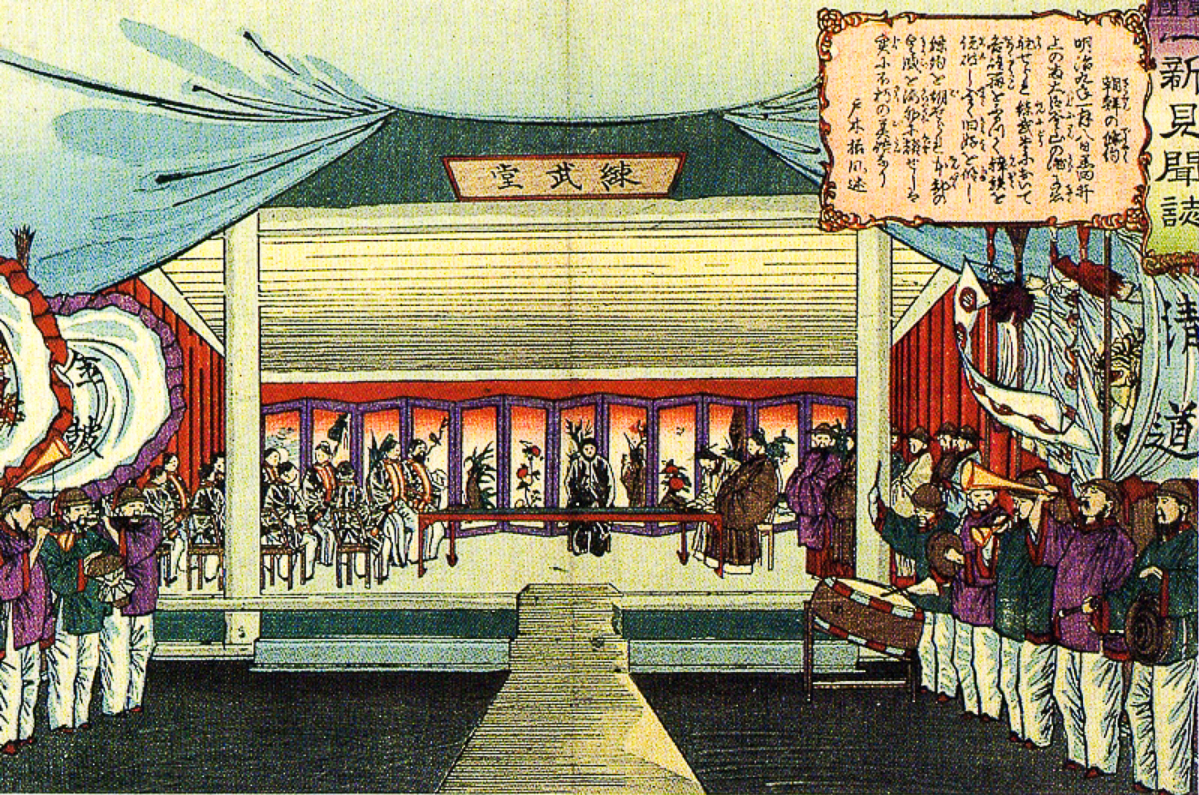
1880 Japanese painting depicting the signing of the treaty

Japan and Korea signed the 'Japan Korea Treaty of Amity' on 26 February 1876. Japan employed gunboat diplomacy to press Korea to sign this unequal treaty. The pact opened up Korea, as Commodore Matthew Perry's fleet of Black Ships had opened up Japan in 1853. According to the treaty, it ended Joseon's status as a tributary state of the Qing dynasty and opened three ports to Japanese trade. The treaty also granted the Japanese people many of the same rights such as extraterritoriality in Korea that Westerners enjoyed in Japan.

The chief treaty negotiators were Kuroda Kiyotaka, Director of the Hokkaidō Colonization Office, and Shin Heon, General/Minister of Joseon-dynasty Korea.

The articles of the treaty were as follows:

- Article 1 stated that Korea was a free nation, "an independent state enjoying the same sovereign rights as does Japan".
- Article 2 stipulated that Japan and Korea would exchange envoys within fifteen months and permanently maintain diplomatic missions in each country. The Japanese would confer with the Ministry of Rites; the Korean envoy would be received by the Foreign Office.
- Under Article 3, Japan would use the Japanese language and Hanmun in diplomatic communiques, and Korea would use Hanmun.
- Article 4 terminated Tsushima's centuries-old role as a diplomatic intermediary by abolishing all agreements then existing between Korea and Tsushima.
- In addition to the open port of Pusan, Article 5 authorized the search in Kyongsang, Kyonggi, Chungcheong, Cholla, and Hamgyong provinces for two more suitable seaports for Japanese trade to be opened in October 1877.
- Article 6 secured aid and support for ships stranded or wrecked along the Korea or Japanese coasts.
- Article 7 permitted any Japanese mariner to conduct surveys and mapping operations at will in the seas off the Korean Peninsula's coastline.
- Article 8 permitted Japanese merchants residence, unhindered trade, and the right to lease land and buildings for those purposes in the open ports.
- Article 9 guaranteed the freedom to conduct business without interference from either government and to trade without restrictions or prohibitions.
- Article 10 granted Japan the right of extraterritoriality, the one feature of previous Western treaties that was most widely resented in Asia. It gave foreigners a free rein to commit crimes with relative impunity, and it also implied the grantor nation's system of law was primitive, unjust, or both.

== Aftermath ==
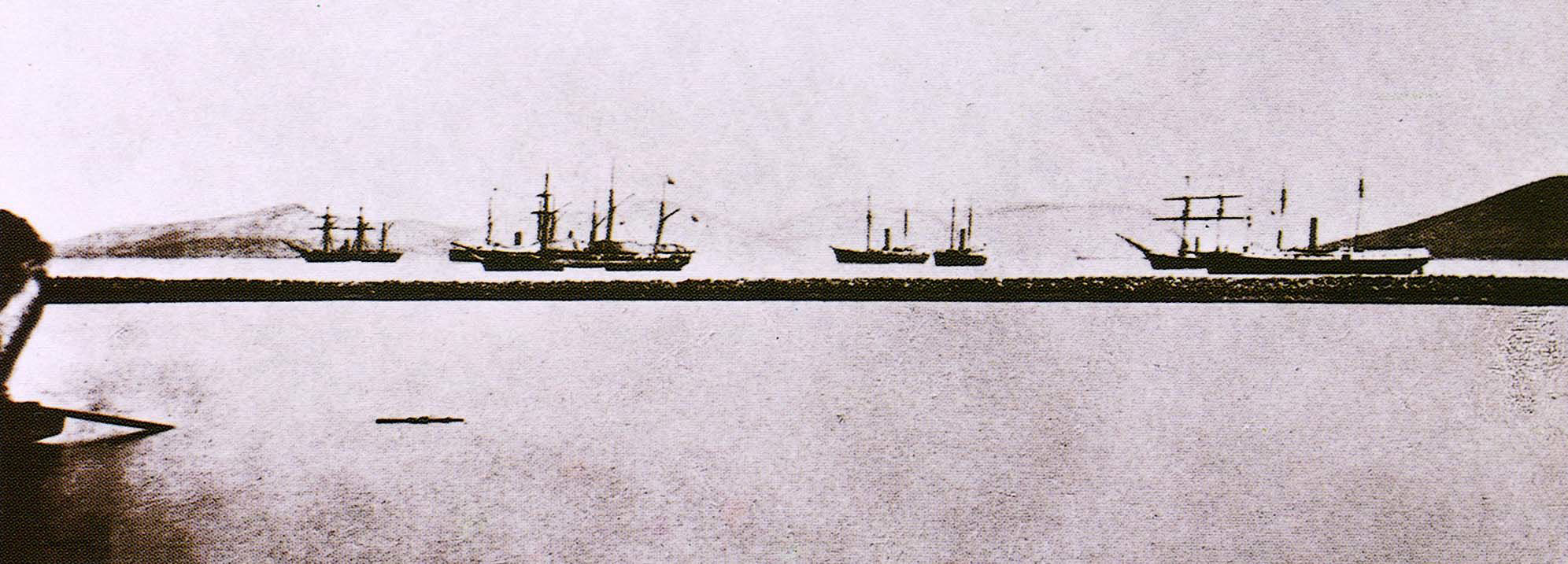
The Imperial Japanese Navy, in Pusan, on its way to Ganghwa Island, Korea, January 16th, 1876. There were two warships (Nisshin, Moshun), three troop transports, and one liner for the embassy led by Kuroda Kiyotaka.

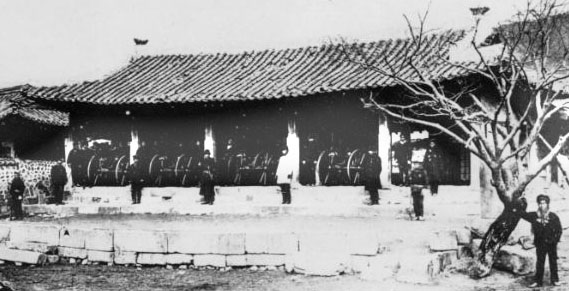
Four Gatling guns set up in Ganghwa by Japanese troops, 1876 Kuroda mission

The following year (1877) saw a Japanese fleet led by Special Envoy Kuroda Kiyotaka coming over to Joseon, demanding an apology from the Korean government and a commercial treaty between the two nations. The Korean government decided to accept the demand in the hope of importing some technologies to defend the country from any future invasions.

However, the treaty would eventually turn out to be the first of many unequal treaties signed by Korea. It gave extraterritorial rights to Japanese citizens in Korea, and forced the Korean government to open three ports to Japan: Busan, Incheon and Wonsan. With the signing of its first unequal treaty, Korea became vulnerable to the influence of imperialistic powers; and later the treaty led Korea to be annexed by Japan.

== See also ==
- Capitulation (treaty)
- French campaign against Korea (1866)
- Ganghwa Island incident (1875)
- Ganghwasanseong Fortress
- General Sherman incident (1866)
- History of Korea
- Japan–Korea disputes
- United States expedition to Korea (1871)
