= Goryeo missions to Japan =

Aspect of Goryeo-Japan relations

Goryeo missions to Japan represent a crucial aspect of the international relations of mutual Goryeo-Japanese contacts and communication, especially during the years in which there were no official contacts between the leaders of Goryeo and the leaders of Japan.

The unique nature of these bilateral diplomatic exchanges evolved from a conceptual framework developed by the Chinese. Gradually, the theoretical model would be modified. The changing model mirrors the evolution of a unique relationship between two neighboring states.

== Goryeo diplomacy ==
The establishment of Goryeo in 918 was accompanied by break in bilateral relations with Japan. Taejo of Goryeo was focused on consolidation within the confines of his kingdom. Goryeo twice sent envoys to Japan, hoping to establish relations, but the venture was rebuffed by the Japanese.

In 1367, Kim Yong and Kim Il traveled as representative of Goryeo to the court of the Ashikaga shogunate. On their return in 1368, Japanese monks Bonto and Bonryu from Tenryu-ji went with them. This was the first diplomatic exchange between Goryeo and Japan since the early 10th century.

Na Heung-yu represented Goryeo interests during his visit to Japan in 1375.

Goryeo envoy Chŏng Mong-ju traveled to Japan in 1377; the consequences of his efforts unfolded slowly.

The Joseon foreign policy would evolve from foundations established in the course Goryeo's foreign relations history.

== List of Goryeo diplomatic envoys ==
- Kim Yong
- Kim Il
- Na Heung-yu
- Chŏng Mong-ju (1337-1392)
- Hank Guk-ju
- Yi Gong-seung (1099-1183)

== Cultural influence ==
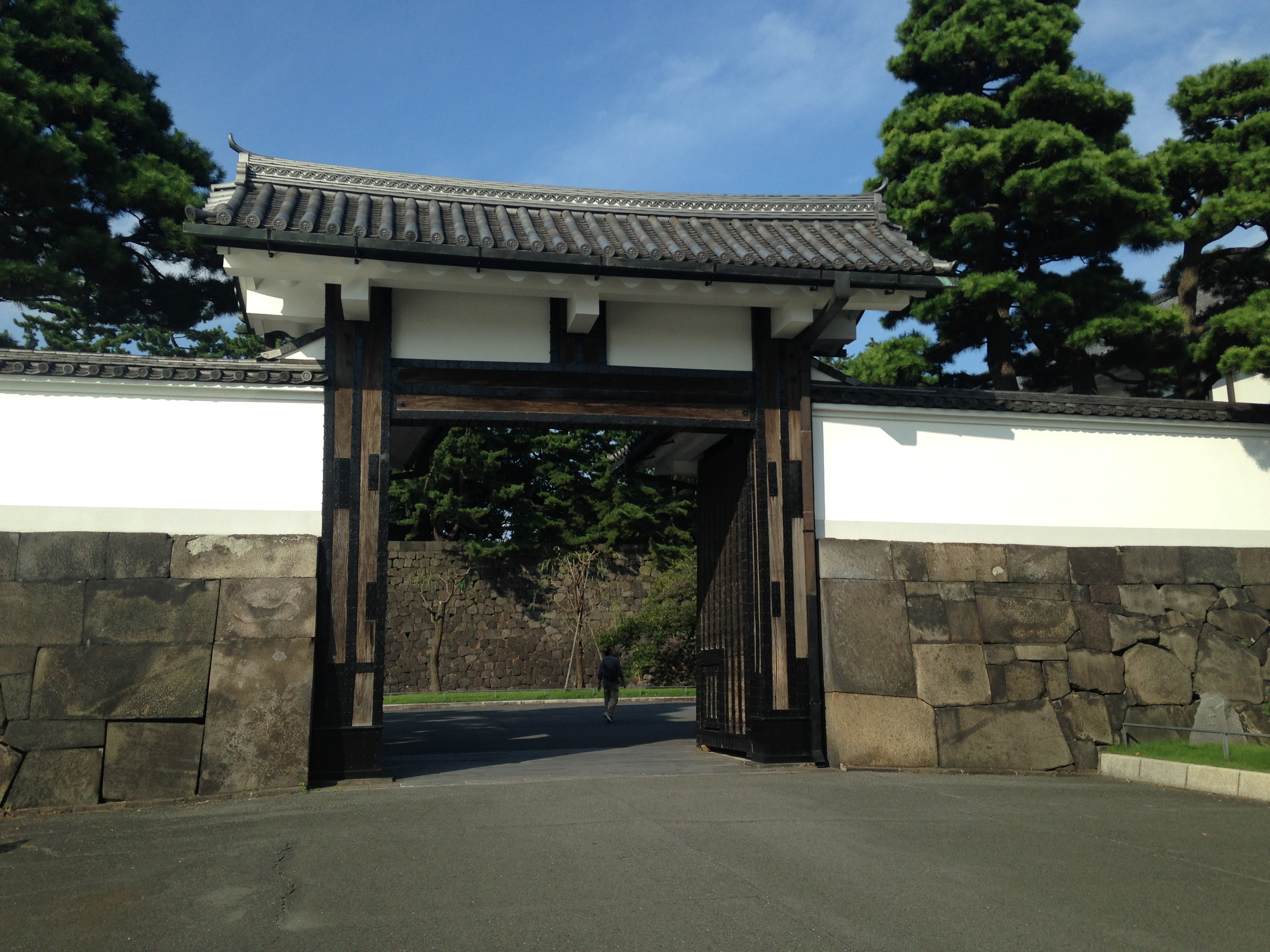
Sakurada-mon of Edo Castle, built as a Kōrai-mon

A number of items were influenced by Goryeo such as architecture. A wooden gate style called Kōrai-mon (高麗門 "Goryeo") gate developed in Japanese castles, as well as other building styles.

== See also ==
- Goryeo missions to Imperial China
- Joseon diplomacy
- Toi invasion
