= Japanese gunboat Un'yō =

Iron-rimmed gunboat part of the Imperial Japanese Navy

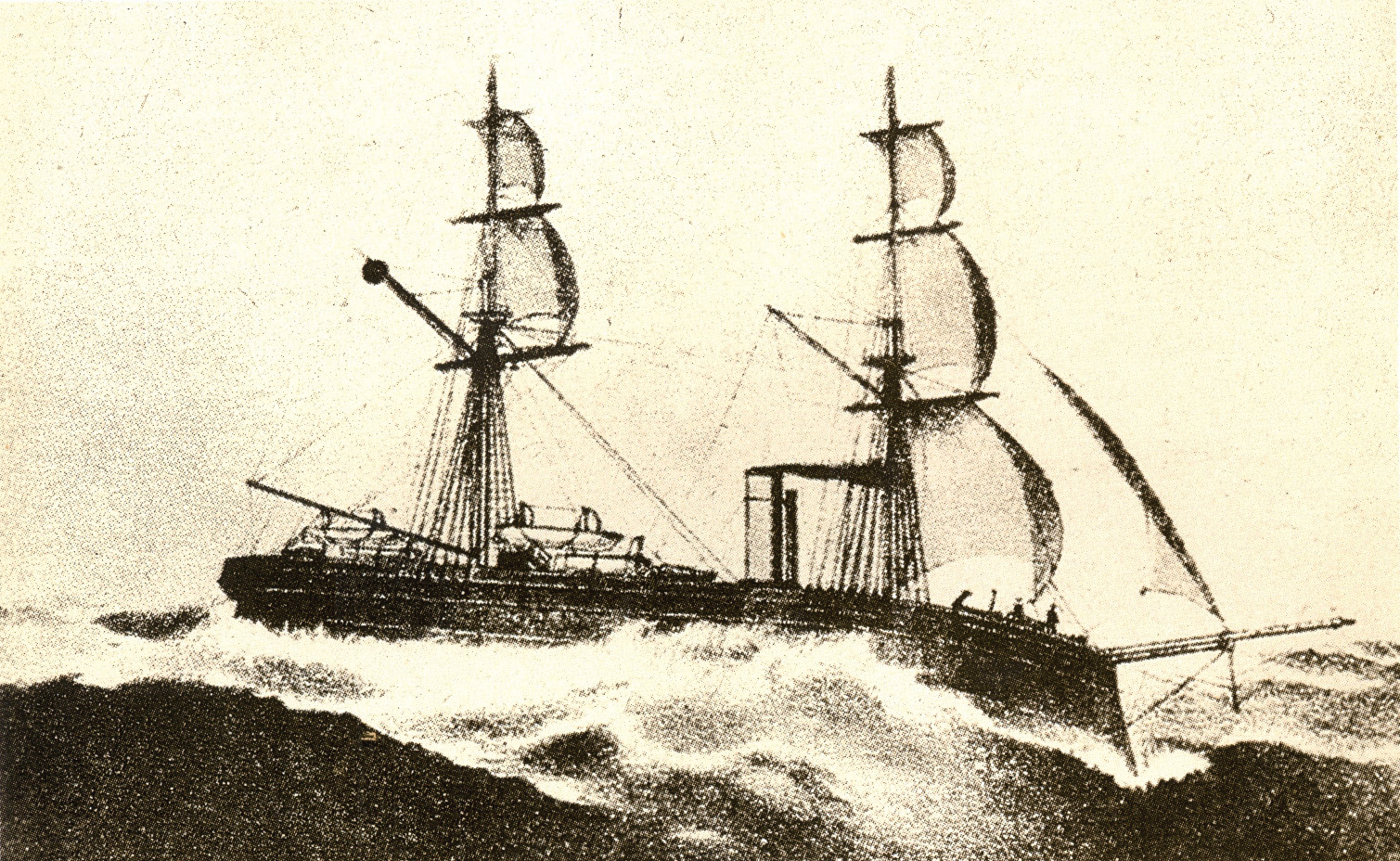
- Japanese warship Un'yō

History
- Name: Un'yō
- Builder: A. Hall & Co., Aberdeen, United Kingdom
- Launched: 1868
- Acquired: February 1870 (by Chōshū Domain)
- Commissioned: July 4, 1870
- Decommissioned: October 31, 1876
- Fate: Scrapped and sold, May 14, 1877

General characteristics
- Displacement: 245 long tons (249 t)
- Length: 35 m (114 ft 10 in) p-p; 35 m (114 ft 10 in) (waterline)
- Beam: 7.5 m (24 ft 7 in)
- Draught: 3.3 m (10 ft 10 in)
- Propulsion: 1-shaft Coal-fired steam engine, 60 ihp (45 kW)
- Sail plan: 2-masted brig
- Speed: 10 knots
- Complement: 65
- Armament: 1 × 16 cm (6.3 in) gun; 1 × 14 cm (5.5 in) gun

Un'yō (雲揚, Rising Cloud) was an iron-ribbed, wooden-hulled sail-and-steam gunboat of the early Meiji period, serving with the fledgling Imperial Japanese Navy. She was a two-masted brig with an auxiliary coal-fired steam engine driving a single screw.

== Background ==
Un'yō was ordered in Britain by the Chōshū Domain in 1868. She was built by A. Hall & Co., Aberdeen, Scotland, and was turned over to the Domain in February 1870 as the Un'yō Maru. On July 25, 1871, she was transferred to the Meiji government and assigned to the newly formed Imperial Japanese Navy, as the Un'yō .

== Imperial Japanese Navy ==
Un'yō was one of the ships dispatched to Kyūshū in 1874 during the Saga Rebellion. In May 1875, she carried diplomats to Busan in Korea in an attempt by the Japanese government to open diplomatic relations with the Joseon dynasty government. After they were rebuffed in these negotiations, the Japanese government again dispatched Un'yō in September 1875 under the command of Inoue Yoshika to provoke a military response, in what was later termed the Ganghwa Island incident. This and the following blockade eventually led to the Treaty of Ganghwa, which opened the Korean Peninsula to Japanese trade. In 1876, Un'yō was assigned to assist in the suppression of the Hagi Rebellion, another uprising of disaffected former samurai. Un'yō was severely damaged when she ran aground at Atawa-Mura, on the coast of the Kii Peninsula, with the loss of 23 of her crew. She was scrapped the following year.
