= Robert Jermain Thomas =

Welsh Protestant missionary (1840–1866)

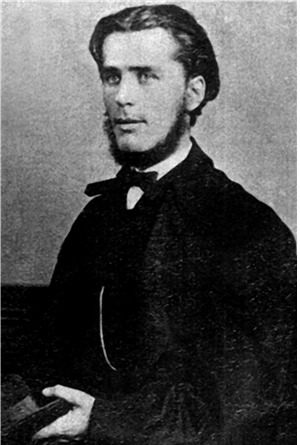
- A photograph of Robert Jermain Thomas
- Born: c. 17 September 1840; Rhayader, Powys, Radnorshire, Wales
- Disappeared: 31 August 1866 (aged c. 26)
- Died: c. 31 August 1866 (aged c. 26)
- Occupation: Missionary
- Known for: Proclaimed martyr of Korea
- Spouse: Caroline Godfrey (m. 1863; died 1864)

Robert Jermain Thomas (c. 17 September 1840 – disappeared 31 August 1866) was a Welsh Protestant Christian missionary who served with the London Missionary Society in late Qing Dynasty China and Korea. While serving as a missionary to China, Thomas developed a strong desire to work among the people of Korea. At the time, Korea was closed to foreigners because of the government's fear of foreign influence. Many Koreans had been converted by Catholic priests in the late 1700s, but the government killed 8,000 of those converts in 1866.

== First visit to Korea ==
Thomas made his first visit to the Korean coast in 1865, making him the second known Protestant missionary to Korea (Karl Gutzlaff, a German Lutheran missionary, was the first, having visited Korea in 1832 and distributed Chinese Bibles to Koreans). Thomas learned as much as he could about the people and their language during his two and a half months there, distributing tracts and New Testaments in Chinese because they were not available in Korean.

During this first visit, Thomas kept a diary of which the following are the entries for 3 and 4 November 1865.

Nov. 3rd.—This morning half-a-dozen junkmen went ashore to catch shell fish, on which three of them were cruelly beaten about the legs by a score of cowardly islanders. Our little fleet of nine junks was in a state of high indignation. We could send fifty men to fight. In their own fashion they immediately loaded their rusty matchlocks and small guns with powder only! And taking to their sampons [sic], flying their respective flags, amidst great beating of gongs, made for the village. All the islanders were congregated like a flock of white sheep on the top of the hill. Two or three of the fiercer ones were going through all kinds of warlike maneuvers on a near cliff. Steadily our flotilla advanced, firing volley after volley of power—the more prudent one fire about five hundred yards from the village. Two of the most daring boats advanced towards the shore, where, by this time, many of those from the hill had collected themselves and were engaged very vigorously in pelting stones; nothing daunted, these two boats seized a small junk lying off the beach, in a trice they had lifted the anchor, and amidst great acclamations brought away their prize. It is a small tub and will be given up tomorrow.

Nov. 4th.—Yesterday, stormy. Today two islanders fixed a small stick in the ground at low water with a piece of paper attached to it. I sent my writer for it; the following is a free translation:--"This for all to see. You are engaged in a contraband trade, a trade severely punished by our respective countries. Your vessels that come here are too much given to disturbances. You have been here already ten days. You have dared to cut wood on a sacred islet with a temple on it, rendering us liable to tempests. Your guilt is very great indeed. As we have none who after the wood, you have taken it in a thievish manner. You are all a set of thieves. You indeed are a desperate set. One of our military officials will come with a thousand men, who will do battle with you and slay you. But now we are willing to make it up and not report it. You must believe this document. The other day you snatched away a vessel; you must return it, and then we will not entertain hostile feelings toward you. Be quick, be quick."

— Robert Jermain Thomas, The West Coast of Korea

== Second visit to Korea ==
In 1866, Thomas was asked to join the French Naval force as an interpreter to go to Korea as a part of invading party. However, the French force went to Vietnam instead. So Thomas took a job as an interpreter on an armed American trading ship, the General Sherman. Thomas persuaded the captain to sail to Pyongyang to establish trade between the United States and Korea, even though uninvited trade was forbidden. Thomas's personal motivation was to spread the gospel in Korea.

The General Sherman set sail on 9 August 1866 and was first spotted at the mouth of the Taedong River on 16 August. As the ship sailed up the river loaded with cotton goods, tin and glass, Thomas tossed gospel tracts onto the riverbank. Korean officials repeatedly ordered the American boat to leave immediately. On or around 25 August, the crew kidnapped Hyon-Ik Yi, a Korean government official, who was in charge of communications with the ship. An ex-military officer, Chun-Gwon Park, eventually managed to rescue Yi and reinstated him to his former position. However, Yi's two subordinates, Soon-Won Yoo and Chi-Young Park, who had also been taken hostage, perished during the scuffles. On 31 August, the crew of General Sherman fired cannons and guns at the nearby civilians, resulting 7 deaths and 5 wounded. Both the Korean government and the early Korean Christian community agreed that it was the General Sherman that had initiated hostilities. Governor Gyu-Su Park of Pyong-An Province finally declared the General Sherman as an enemy vessel and ordered his troops to prepare for battle.

== Death ==
When the General Sherman ran aground on a mud-bank near Pyongyang, the Koreans saw their opportunity and attacked. The crew held off the attackers for two days. Eventually, the Koreans launched a burning boat, which set the General Sherman on fire. Among the crew, 14 were shot and killed (including one who had been shot to death two days before), four were burnt to death, and two who had jumped to shore were beaten to death by angry civilians on the shore. Thomas most likely died during or shortly after the attacks.

Thomas's fate is unknown. However, there are unverified accounts of Thomas dying. The first claim appeared on Oh Mun-hwan's "Christian News" article of 8 December 1926, reporting that Thomas was killed in retribution by the relatives of those who had been killed by the crew of the General Sherman. In the same article, the author cites a statement from Rev. Lee Jae Bong, a minister in Southern province (1,000 miles away). He had a distant relative who happened to be a soldier present during the General Sherman incident. This former soldier said that one of the crew being executed by sword had a red book which he begged the soldiers to take. Mr. Oh concluded that this man must have been Thomas. A year later, this account had evolved stating that Thomas tried to hand his Bible to the executioner and that this soldier later told his family that he had killed a good man (the "Korea Mission Field," Sept. 1927). Others claimed that Thomas's executioner was none other than Chun-Gwon Park, who had previously rescued the government official, Hyon-Ik Yi.

The Korean official report of the General Sherman incident clearly states that Thomas was killed by civilians, not by Park, and this is corroborated by Oh Mun-Hwan's 1926 article. In another account, Thomas leapt to shore carrying a Bible, which he offered to his attackers while crying, "Jesus, Jesus!" in Korean. This account was also rebutted by others who stated that Thomas was waving the official signet of Hyon-Ik Yi which had probably been taken from him when he was kidnapped. Hyon-Ik Yi was later demoted for losing an important official signet.

== Legacy ==
"One government official named Pak Yong-Sik who took home some of the Bibles thrown onto the river bank, used them to wallpaper rooms in his house, so people were able to read the gospel there for themselves." This was discovered by the local Christian community in early 1900s, and people came from all over to read the words on his walls. Eventually, a church was established in the area. Certainly, Thomas's influence grew after his death. Only fifteen years later, Pyongyang had become a strong Christian center with a hundred churches. According to Sungho Choi, lecturer at the Wales Evangelical School of Theology, contemporary Korean Christians may not know that Wales is a country with its own language and history, but they do know that Thomas was Welsh.

== Personal life ==
Robert Thomas was married to Caroline Godfrey (b. 1835) during the years of 1863–1864. Caroline died of a miscarriage only three months after their arrival in Shanghai, China.

== See also ==
- Samuel Austin Moffett

== Bibliography ==
- Alexander Wylie (1867). Memorials of Protestant Missionaries to the Chinese: Giving a List of Their Publications, and Obituary Notices of the Deceased. Shanghai: American Presbyterian Mission Press.
- Broomhall, Alfred (1982). Hudson Taylor and China's Open Century: Barbarians at the Gates. London: Hodder and Stoughton.
