= Tribute =

Wealth given by one party to another to show respect, allegiance, or submission

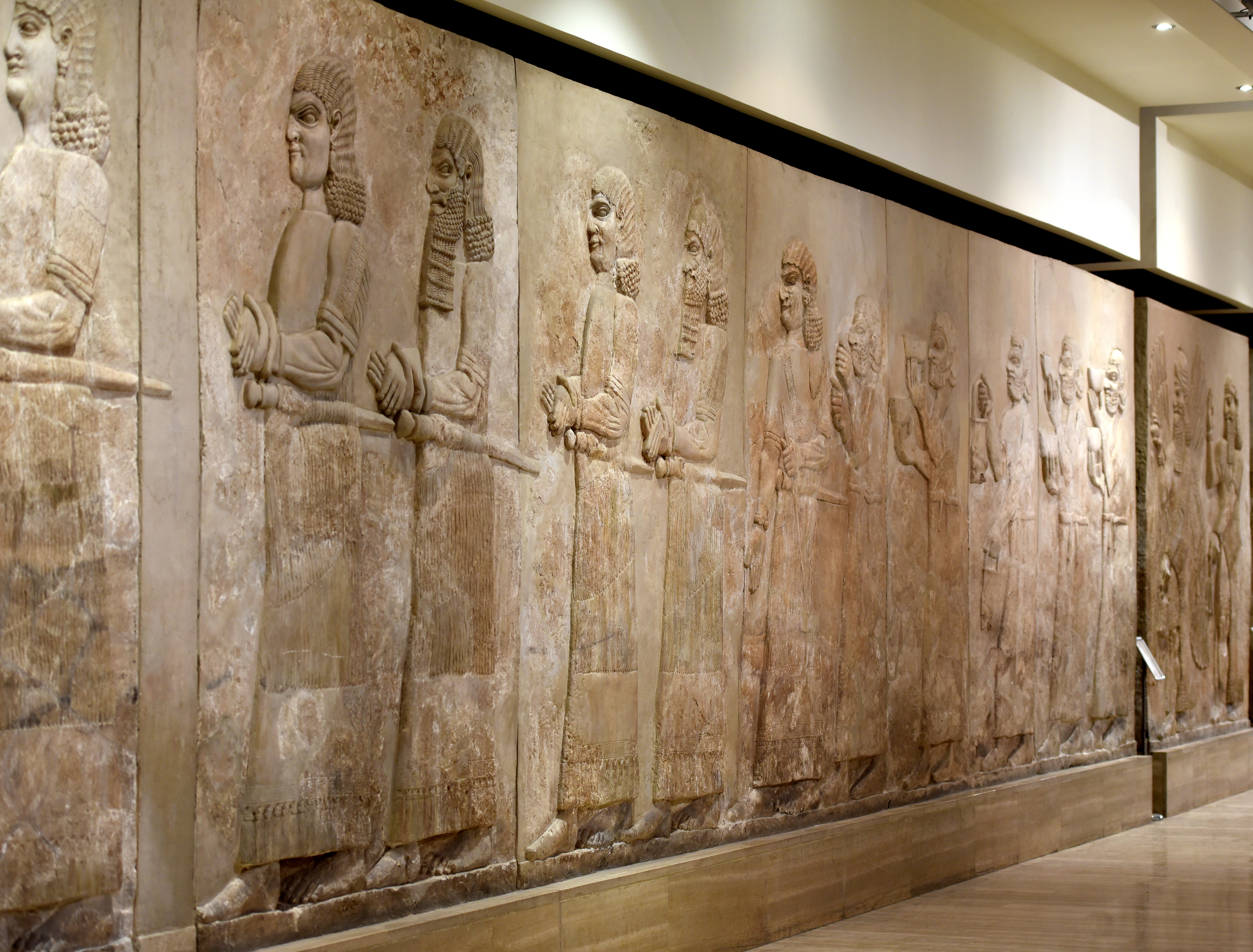
A procession of high-ranking Assyrian officials followed by tribute bearers from Urartu. From Khorsabad, Iraq, c. 710 BCE. Iraq Museum

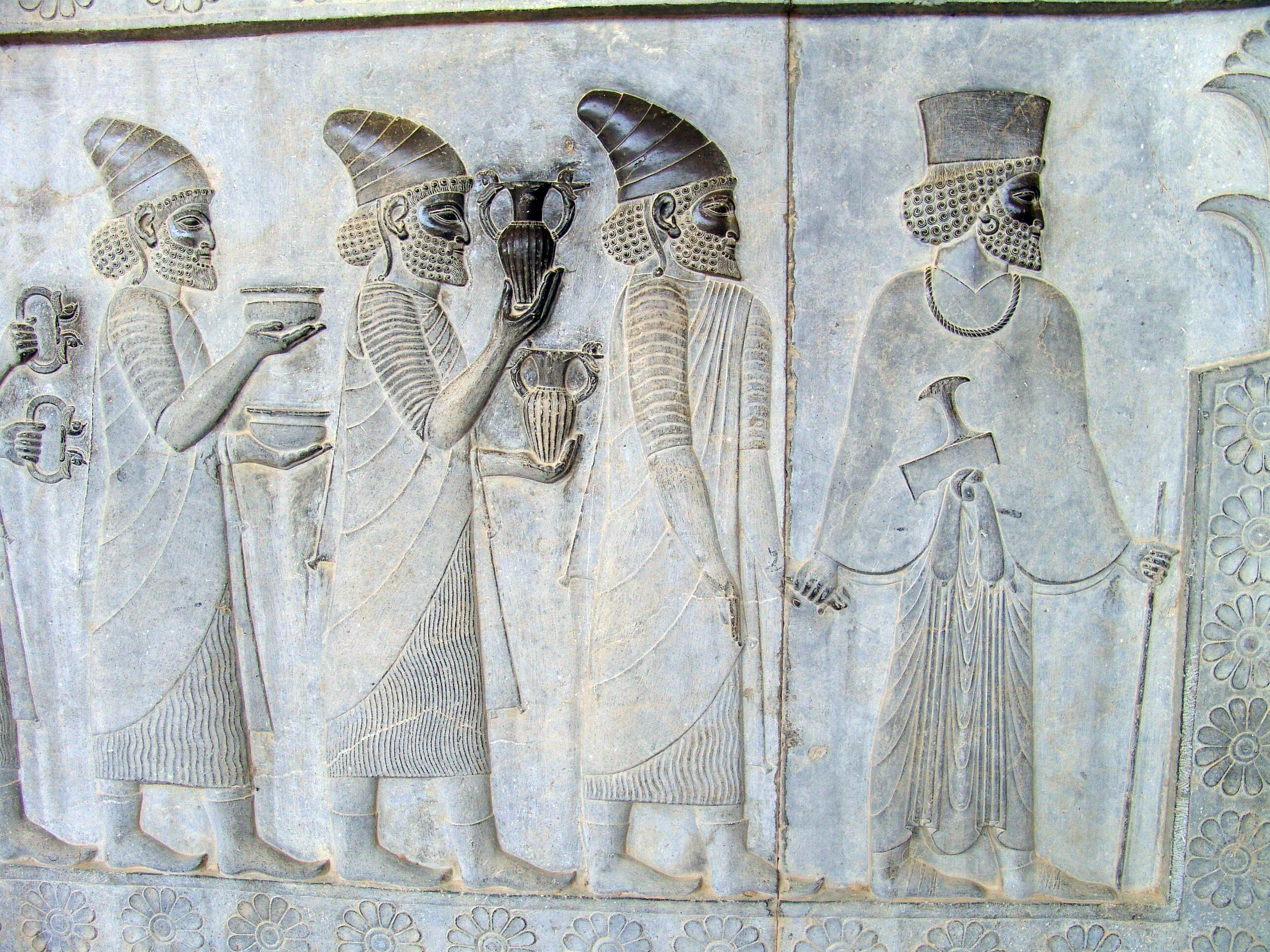
Objects in the "Apadana" reliefs at Persepolis: armlets, bowls, and amphorae with griffin handles are given as tribute.

A tribute (/ˈtrɪbjuːt/; from Latin tributum, 'contribution') is wealth, often in kind, that a party gives to another as a sign of submission, allegiance or respect. Various ancient states exacted tribute from the rulers of lands which the state conquered. In the case of alliances, lesser parties may pay tribute to more powerful parties as a sign of allegiance. Tributes are different from taxes, as they are not collected in the same regularly routine manner that taxes are. Further, with tributes, a recognition of political submission by the payer to the payee is uniquely required.

== Overview ==
Ancient China received tribute from various states such as Japan, Korea, Vietnam, Cambodia, Borneo, Indonesia, Sri Lanka, Nepal, Myanmar and Central Asia.

The Aztec Empire is another example, as it received tribute from the various city-states and provinces that it conquered.

== Aztec Empire ==
=== Tributes as a form of government ===
The Aztecs used tributes as a means for maintaining control over conquered areas. This meant that rather than replacing existing political figures with Aztec rulers or colonizing newly conquered areas, the Aztecs would simply collect tributes. Ideally, there was no interference in the local affairs of conquered peoples unless these tributes were not paid.

There were two types of provinces that paid tribute to the Aztec Empire. First, there were strategic provinces. These provinces were considered client states, as they consensually paid tributes in exchange for good relations with the Aztecs. Second, there were tributary provinces or tributary states. These provinces were mandated to pay a regular tribute, whether they wanted to or not.

=== The hierarchy of tribute collection ===
Many different levels of Aztec officials were involved in managing the empire's tribute system. The lowest ranking officials were known as calpixque. Their job was to collect, transport, and receive tributes from each province. Sometimes one calpixque was assigned to an entire province. Other times, multiple calpixques were assigned to each province. This was done to ensure that there was one calpixque present at each of the provinces' various towns. One rank higher than the calpixque were the huecalpixque. They served as managers of the calpixque. Above the huecalpixque were the petlacalcatl. Based in Tenochtitlan, they oversaw the entire tribute system. There was also a military trained official known as the cuahtlatoani. They were only involved when newly conquered provinces resisted paying tribute.

=== Types of tributes ===
Natural resources were in high demand throughout the Aztec Empire because they were crucial for construction, weaponry and religious ceremonies. Certain regions of Mexico with higher quantities of natural resources were able to pay a larger tribute. The basin of Mexico, for instance, had a large resource pool of obsidian and salt ware. This increased usefulness of such regions and played a role in their social status and mobility throughout the empire.

As expansion continued with tribute, the demand for warriors to serve the Empire in their efforts to take control of nearby city/state regions increased drastically. "Land belonged to the city-state ruler, and in return for access to land commoners were obliged to provide their lord with tribute in goods and rotational labor service. They could also be called on for military service and construction projects." It was very common to be called for military service, as it was vital to the expansion of the Aztec Empire.

Tributes to the Aztec Empire were also made through gold, silver, jade and other metals that were important to Aztec culture and seen as valuable.

== China ==
China often received tribute from the states under the influence of Confucian civilization and gave them Chinese products and recognition of their authority and sovereignty in return. There were several tribute states to the Chinese-established empires throughout ancient history, including neighboring countries such as Japan, Korea, Vietnam, Cambodia, Borneo, Indonesia and Central Asia. This tributary system and relationship are well known as Jimi (羁縻) or Cefeng (冊封), or Chaogong (朝貢). In Japanese, the tributary system and relationship is referred to as Shinkou (進貢), Sakuhou (冊封) and Choukou (朝貢).

According to the Chinese Book of Han, the various tribes of Japan (constituting the nation of Wa) had already entered into tributary relationships with China by the first century. However, Japan ceased to present tribute to China and left the tributary system during the Heian period without damaging economic ties. Although Japan eventually returned to the tributary system during the Muromachi period in the reign of Ashikaga Yoshimitsu, it did not recommence presenting tribute, and it did not last after Yoshimitsu's death (Note that Ashikaga Yoshimitsu was a Shogun, hence technically, he was not the head of the state. Hence, this made him subordinate to both the emperor of Japan and the Chinese emperor at the same time. The Japanese emperor continued to refuse to join the tributary system).

According to the Korean historical document Samguk sagi, Goguryeo sent a diplomatic representative to the Han dynasty in 32 AD, and Emperor Guangwu of Han officially acknowledged Goguryeo with a title. The tributary relationship between China and Korea was established during the Three Kingdoms of Korea, but in practice it was only a diplomatic formality to strengthen legitimacy and gain access to cultural goods from China. This continued under different dynasties and varying degrees until China's defeat in the Sino-Japanese War of 1894–1895.

The relationship between China and Vietnam was a "hierarchic tributary system". China ended its suzerainty over Vietnam with the Treaty of Tientsin (1885) following the Sino-French War. Thailand was always subordinate to China as a vassal or a tributary state since the Sui dynasty until the Taiping Rebellion of the late Qing dynasty in the mid-19th century.

Some tributaries of imperial China encompasses suzerain kingdoms from China in East Asia has been prepared. Before the 20th century, the geopolitics of East and Southeast Asia were influenced by the Chinese tributary system. This assured them their sovereignty and the system assured China the incoming of certain valuable assets. "The theoretical justification" for this exchange was the Mandate of Heaven, that stated the fact that the emperor of China was empowered by the heavens to rule, and with this rule the whole mankind would end up being beneficiary of good deeds. Most of the Asian countries joined this system voluntary.

== Islamic Caliphate ==
The Islamic Caliphate introduced a new form of tribute, known as the 'jizya', that differed significantly from earlier Roman forms of tribute. According to Patricia Seed:

What distinguished jizya historically from the Roman form of tribute is that it was exclusively a tax on persons, and on adult men. Roman "tribute" was sometimes a form of borrowing as well as a tax. It could be levied on land, landowners, and slaveholders, as well as on people. Even when assessed on individuals, the amount was often determined by the value of the group's assets and did not depend—as did Islamic jizya—upon actual head counts of men of fighting age. Christian Iberian rulers would later adopt similar taxes during their reconquest of the peninsula.

Christians of the Iberian Peninsula translated the term 'jizya' as tributo. This form of tribute was later also applied by the Spanish empire to their territories in the New World.

== See also ==
- Tributary system of China
  - List of tributary states of China
  - List of recipients of tribute from China
- Puppet state
- Satellite state
- Suzerainty
- Vassal state
- Tributary state
- Taxation
