= General Sherman incident =

1866 destruction of a US ship in Korea

- Part of events prior to the Korean Expedition
Date	9 August – 2 September 1866
Location	Taedong River, Pyongyang
Result	General Sherman destroyed and crew killed: Korean Expedition dispatched in 1871

Belligerents
Korea	United States

Commanders and leaders
Regent Daewongun; Bak Gyusu; Yi Hyon-ik	Captain Page †

Units involved
1 turtle ship 9 fire ships	SS General Sherman

Casualties and losses
1 killed 6 fire ships destroyed	19 killed; 1 schooner destroyed
- 7 civilians killed

The General Sherman incident (Korean: 제너럴셔먼호 사건) was the destruction in 1866 of the American merchant ship SS General Sherman in the Taedong River during an unsuccessful and illegal attempt by the ship's crew to open up trade with the isolationist Joseon dynasty of Korea. With the rapid increase in Western imperialism in Asia during the 19th century, Asian nations came under increasing pressure to end their isolationist policies. Despite China and Japan being forcibly opened to foreign trade by Western powers, Korea maintained its isolationism.

The General Sherman purchased stocks of cotton textiles, tinware, mirrors and glassware from Tianjin before sailing up the Taedong River. Korean officials informed the ship's captain that he was not allowed to trade in Korea; these instructions were ignored. Eventually, Regent Daewongun, believing the General Sherman to be a French Navy warship on a punitive mission to avenge the deaths of Catholic priests in Korea, ordered Pyongan Province governor Bak Gyusu to inform the crew that if they did not leave Korean waters they would be executed.

The crew of the General Sherman then dispatched a dinghy to forage, which took Korean official Yi Hyon-ik hostage. Bak attempted to negotiate for his release, while a crew of civilian onlookers gathered around the General Sherman, attacking the merchant ship in anger. The General Sherman responded by firing its cannons against the civilians onshore. The Koreans then dispatched troops and an improvised warship to destroy the General Sherman, but these efforts were repulsed. Eventually, waves of fire ships set the merchantman on fire.

The crew of the General Sherman jumped off the ship and were killed by enraged civilians on the shore. Korean officials did not inform the U.S. government of the incident and evaded inquiries from American officials. Five years later in 1871, the United States dispatched a military expedition to Korea, in part to ascertain the fate of the General Sherman. After being ambushed, the expeditionary force captured and occupied several Korean forts after a brief battle. The Korean government eventually ended its isolationism in the Japan–Korea Treaty of 1876.

== Background ==
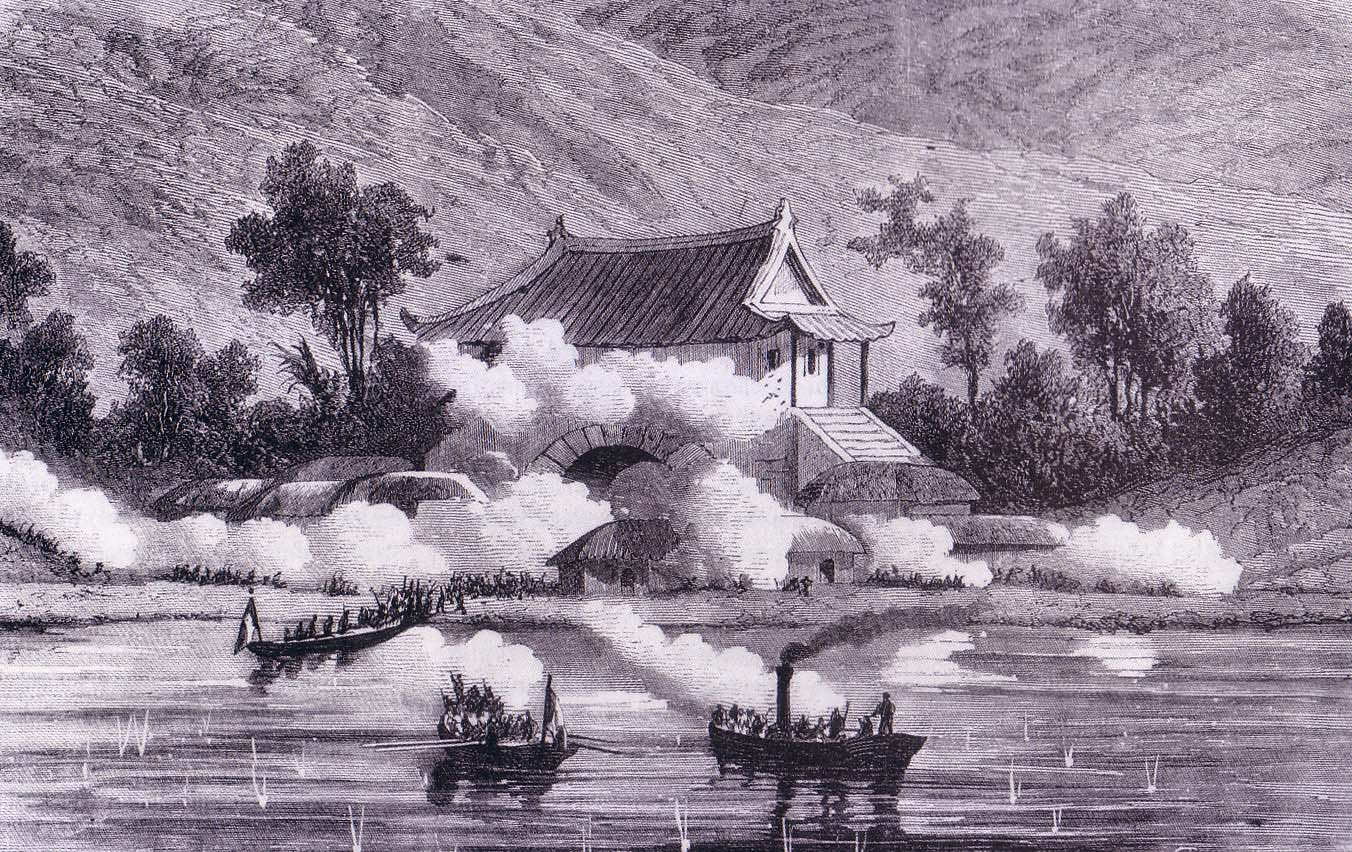
An illustration of the French expedition to Korea

The region of Korea had been under the control of the Joseon dynasty since 1392. During the period of Joseon control, Korea, known in the West as the "Hermit Kingdom", had adopted several isolationist policies in response to Manchu and Japanese invasions. These policies remained in place during the 19th century, a period which saw the rapid increase in Western imperialism in Asia, including the Opium Wars which led to the opening of Qing China to foreign trade.

Increasing Western influence in Asia saw Christian missionaries travel to the region to proselytize, which led them into conflict with various Asian governments over the tensions caused by the introduction of Christianity. In China, the activities of Western missionaries indirectly led to the Taiping Rebellion, as Christian rebels led by Hong Xiuquan revolted against the Manchu-ruled Qing government. In response to these developments and what Joseon royalty perceived as a subversive religion, regent Heungseon Daewongun initiated a series of persecutions of Korean Christians in 1866 in which 8,000 were killed, including nine French missionaries. In response, the French had threatened to dispatch an expedition to Korea.

Foreign merchants who attempted to travel to Korea for trade were rebuffed by local officials, though the Korean government attempted to maintain friendly relations with Western powers. Meanwhile, the United States was attempting to expand its influence in Asia, and in 1854 forced the Japanese government to open Japan to foreign trade. American merchants hoped that a similar process could lead to the opening of Korea.

== Incident ==
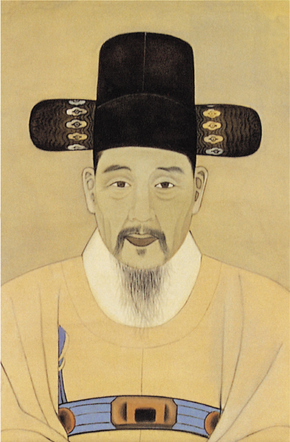
A painting of Bak Gyusu

Determined to force the Korean government to end its isolationism, the SS General Sherman, an armed merchant schooner owned by Boston businessman W. B. Preston, made plans to travel to Korea. The crew of the General Sherman consisted of Captain Page and Chief Mate Wilson (both Americans), English supercargo George Hogarth and thirteen Asian crew-members, which included Chinese sailor and interpreter Chao Ling Feng, two pilots from Shandong and ten sailors from Beijing, Malaya and South China (who were possibly former soldiers in service of Henry Andres Burgevine). Also on board were a money changer from Guangzhou, Welsh missionary Robert Jermain Thomas and Preston.

Prior to travelling to Korea, the ship's crew purchased stocks of cotton textiles, tinware, mirrors and glassware from British trading firm Messrs. Meadows and Co. in Tianjin and travelled to Yantai before departing for Korean waters on August 9, 1866. Entering the Taedong River on August 16, the crew made frequent stops for Thomas to hand out Bibles to Korean villagers. Korean officials repeatedly informed Page that the ship was not allowed to trade in Korea, which were ignored by the crew.

After receiving reports of the General Sherman and its voyage, Daewongun believed the merchantman to be a French Navy warship on a punitive mission to avenge the deaths of Catholic priests in Korea. He ordered governor of Pyongan Bak Gyusu to inform the crew that if they did not leave they would be killed. In the meantime, the General Sherman ran aground on the river when the tide receded, having misjudged the depth of the river due to a temporary rain swell. On August 27, the crew dispatched a dinghy to forage, which was intercepted by a junk carrying Korean official Yi Hyon-ik, a subordinate of Bak. The crew of the General Sherman took the occupants of the junk hostage. Bak attempted to negotiate for their release, with the crew responding by demanding a ransom of rice, gold, silver, and ginseng for the release of the hostages.

A crowd of civilian onlookers, which had gathered near the stranded merchantman, grew so angered by the unfolding situation that they began attacking the General Sherman with arrows, stones, and Hwacha rockets. In the ensuing chaos, Korean soldier Park Chong-wun commandeered a dinghy and rescued Yi. In response, the General Sherman began bombarding the civilian onlookers with its twelve-pound cannons, killing seven. On September 2, Daewongun dispatched Korean troops equipped with matchlocks with orders to destroy the stranded merchantman. The Koreans initially attempted to destroy the General Sherman by constructing an improvised turtle ship, which was protected by metal sheeting and cowhides and equipped with a concealed cannon. However, the turtle ship's cannon proved unable to penetrate the armor of the General Sherman, and return fire killed a crewmember of the Korean warship.

After the first attack failed, the Koreans then roped together three small boats loaded with firewood, saltpeter, and sulfur, lighting them on fire, and sent them drifting towards the General Sherman. Though the first trio of fire ships missed their target and a second wave bounced off the General Sherman, the third wave set the merchantman on fire. The crew and passengers of the General Sherman abandoned the ship but were killed by enraged civilian onlookers on the shore. The death of Thomas, which supposedly occurred while attempting to hand a Bible to his killer, was later portrayed as an act of martyrdom. The cannons of the General Sherman were salvaged by the Korean government, which celebrated its successful resolution of the incident.

== Aftermath ==
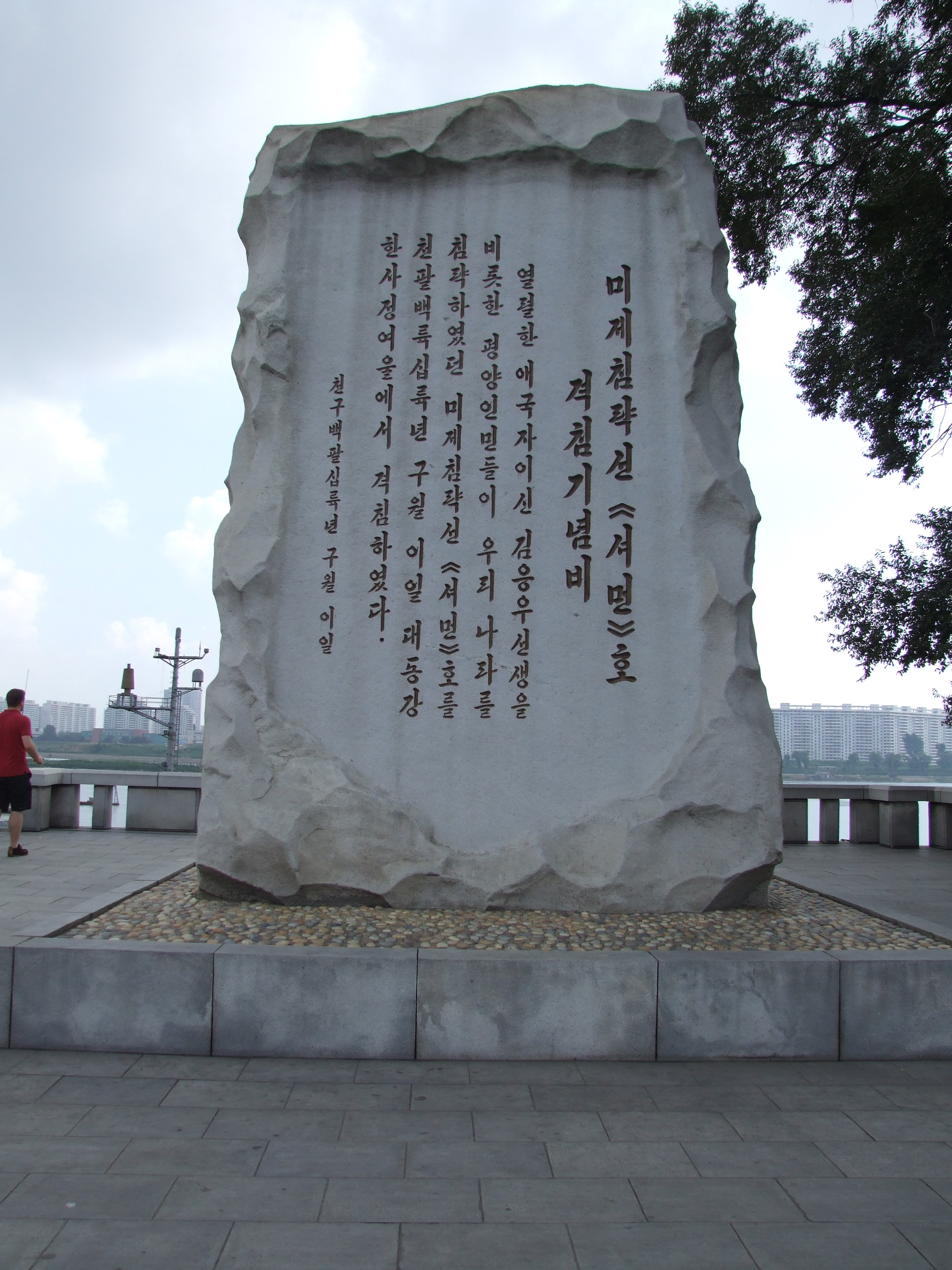
A monument commemorating the General Sherman incident in Pyongyang

After the incident, the U.S. government remained unaware of the fate of the General Sherman, as Korean officials refrained from informing their American counterparts of what had happened. This was in part due to the Korean government believing that the General Sherman was a British or French ship, and also over concerns that informing the U.S. government would lead to a punitive expedition or a demand for reparations from the United States. Several U.S. Navy officials conducted investigations in Korea in 1867 and 1868, though Korean officials evaded their questions concerning the General Sherman. In the meantime, the French expedition to Korea overshadowed the General Sherman incident, the unsuccessful invasion taking place just two months later, further reaffirming Korean isolationism.

In 1871, the U.S. State Department dispatched Frederick Low, the United States Minister to China alongside the Asiatic Squadron of the U.S. Navy to investigate the disappearance of the General Sherman and negotiate a treaty with the Korean government which would open up Korea to foreign trade. The expedition consisted of five ships: frigate Colorado, sloops Alaska and Benicia and gunboats Monocacy and Palos. The New York Times claimed that the expedition would produce a "Detailed Account of the Treacherous Attack of the Coreans on Our Launches" and deliver "Speedy and Effective Punishment of the Barbarians".

The expedition departed from Nagasaki on 16 May, arriving at Incheon a week later before setting anchor at Ganghwa Island on 28 May. On 30 May and 31, the expedition made contact with Korean officials, who rebuffed American offers to negotiate, noting that their government "was not the least interested in a trade treaty". Two days later on June 1, the expedition was ambushed by Korean troops as it was sailing up the Han River, with the Americans repulsing the ambushing forces. After failing to receive an apology and receiving confirmation of the fate of the General Sherman, the American expedition attacked and occupied a series of Korean forts. Though the U.S. had emerged militarily victorious, the Korean government maintained its isolationist stance, which would only be ended in the Japan–Korea Treaty of 1876.

== Legacy ==
According to official North Korean accounts, Kim Ŭngu, the great-grandfather of Kim Il Sung, led a group of volunteers to attack the USS General Sherman. The story states that they sank the ship by burning it with firewood, and that a second ship, the Shenandoah, was sent by the United States before also being destroyed by Kim. Although there is no historical evidence that Kim Ŭngu was actually involved in the event, he is still considered a national hero in North Korea and is remembered as the revolutionary founder of the Kim dynasty.

== See also ==
- USS Pueblo (AGER-2)
- Perry Expedition, similar event in Japan
