= Ganghwa Island incident =

1875 battle between Japan and Korea

Battle of Ganghwa
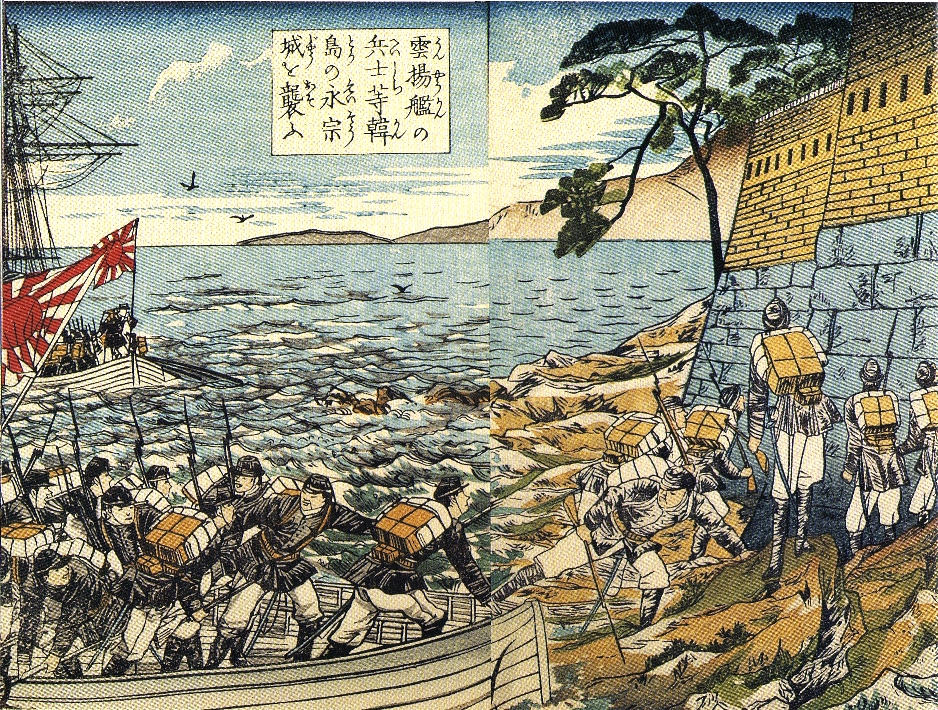
- Japanese marines landing from the Un'yō at Yeongjong Island which is near Ganghwa
Date	September 20, 1875
Location	Ganghwa Island, Korea (now Ganghwa Island, South Korea) 37.7305°N 126.4984°E
Result	Japanese victory: Treaty of Ganghwa

Belligerents
Japan	Korea

Commanders and leaders
Inoue Yoshika	Commander Lee Min-deok

Strength
Land: 22 sailors and marines Sea: 1 gunboat	Land: 500 infantry Artillery pieces

Casualties and losses
1 killed 1 wounded	35 killed 16 captured 36 artillery piece and small cannon captured 1 fort destroyed

The Ganghwa Island incident or the Japanese Battle of Ganghwa (Korean: 운요호 사건 [雲揚號事件] Unyo-ho sageon meaning "Un'yō incident"; Japanese: 江華島事件 Kōka-tō jiken) was an armed clash between the Joseon dynasty of Korea and Japan which occurred in the vicinity of Ganghwa Island on September 20, 1875.

== Background ==
In the second half of the 19th century, the Korean Peninsula was the scene of a power struggle between several imperial powers, including the Russians and the French, as well as the Chinese and the Japanese.

The Meiji Restoration of 1868 ended the 265-year-old feudalistic Tokugawa shogunate in Japan. The new government of Japan sent a messenger holding a letter with the sovereign's message which informed of the founding of a new administration of Japan to the government of Korea Joseon dynasty on December 19, 1868.

However, the Koreans refused to receive the letter because it contained the Chinese characters 皇 ("royal, imperial") and 勅 ("imperial decree"). According to the political system of the day, only the Chinese emperor was allowed to use those characters, as they signified the imperial authority of China. Hence, their use by a Japanese sovereign was considered unacceptable to the Koreans by implying that he was an equal of the emperor of China.

The Chinese suggested to the Koreans to receive the sovereign letter from Japan because China knew the power of Japan at that moment. Despite government-level negotiations held in 1875 at Pusan, no substantial progress was made. Instead, tension grew as the Koreans continued to refuse to recognize Japan's claims of equality with China.

== Engagement at Ganghwa Island ==
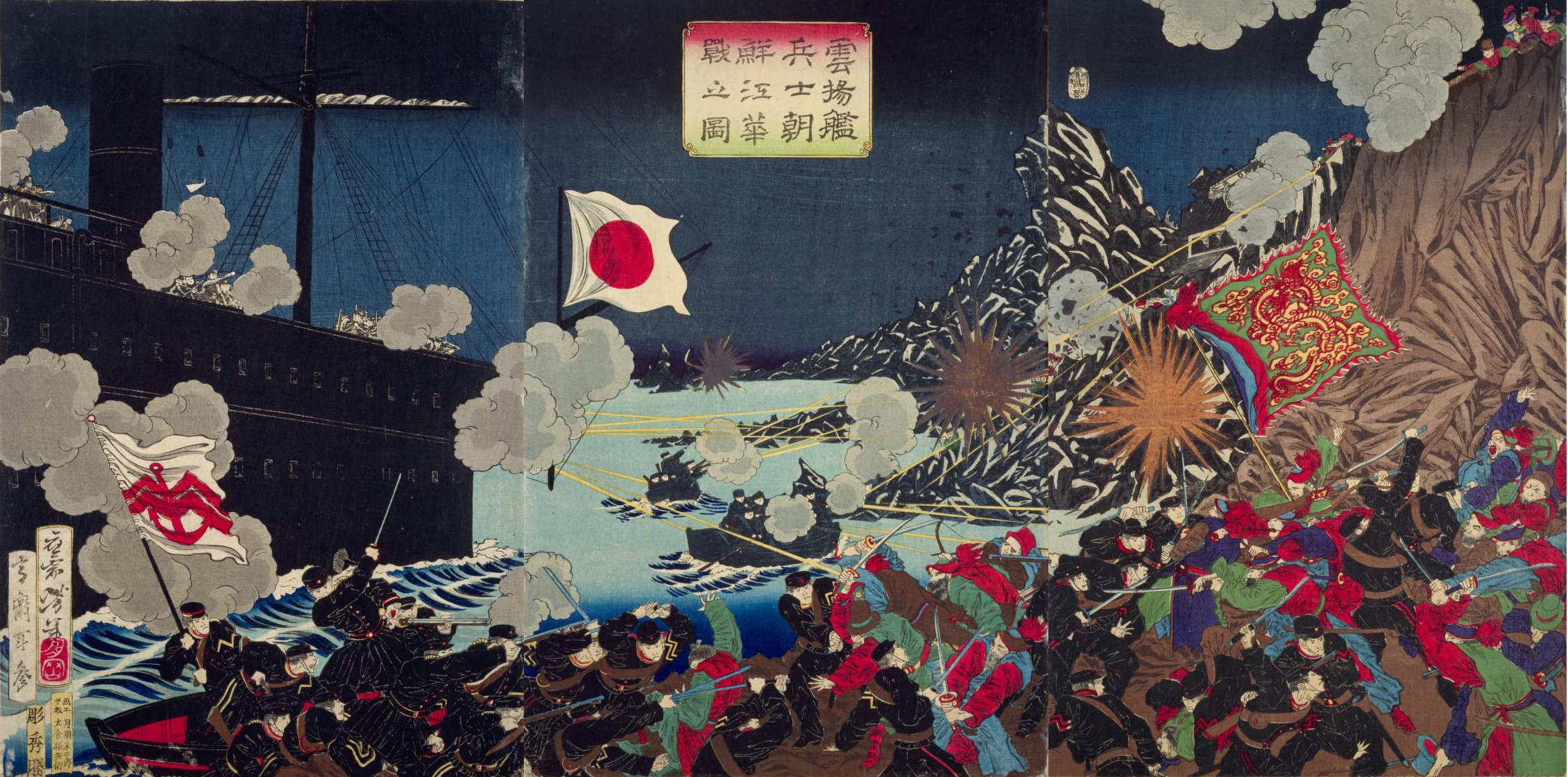
The landing of the forces of the Un'yō at Ganghwa Island. Japanese woodblock print.

Ganghwa Island had been a site of violent confrontations between Korean forces and foreign forces over the previous decade. In 1866, the island was briefly occupied during the French expedition against Korea, and in 1871 it was the site of an American expedition.

On the morning of September 20, 1875, the Un'yō under the command of Inoue Yoshika was dispatched to survey Korean coastal waters. While surveying the Western coast of Korea, the Japanese put ashore a party on Ganghwa Island to request water and provisions. When the shore batteries of the Korean forts fired on the Un'yō, the Japanese response was swift and severe. After bombarding the Korean fortifications, the Japanese landed a shore party that torched several houses on the island and engaged Korean troops. Armed with modern rifles, they made quick work of the Koreans who carried matchlock muskets; consequently, thirty-five Korean soldiers were killed. News of the incident did not reach Tokyo until September 28, but the following day the Dajōkan decided to dispatch gun boats to Pusan to protect Japanese residents there. It also began deliberating whether or not to send a mission to Korea to settle the incident.

== Aftermath ==
The number of casualties of the incident was recorded at 35 in the Joseon Dynasty with two Japanese soldiers wounded. In addition, 16 Korean naval personnel were captured by Japan. Many weapons were also looted. After the incident, the Imperial Japanese Navy blockaded the immediate area and requested an official apology from the Joseon government, which was concluded with the dispatch of the Kuroda mission and the signing of the Treaty of Ganghwa on February 27, 1876, which opened the Korean Peninsula to Japanese and foreign trade.

== See also ==
- Meiji era

== Sources ==
- Duus, Peter (1998). The Abacus and the Sword: The Japanese Penetration of Korea. University of California Press. ISBN 0-52092-090-2.
- Keene, Donald (2002). Emperor of Japan: Meiji and His World, 1852–1912. New York: Columbia University Press. ISBN 0-231-12341-8.
- Jansen, Marius B. (2002). The Making of Modern Japan. Harvard University Press. ISBN 0-6740-0334-9.
