= Inoue Yoshika =

Japanese admiral (1845–1929)

Viscount Inoue Yoshika
- 井上 良馨
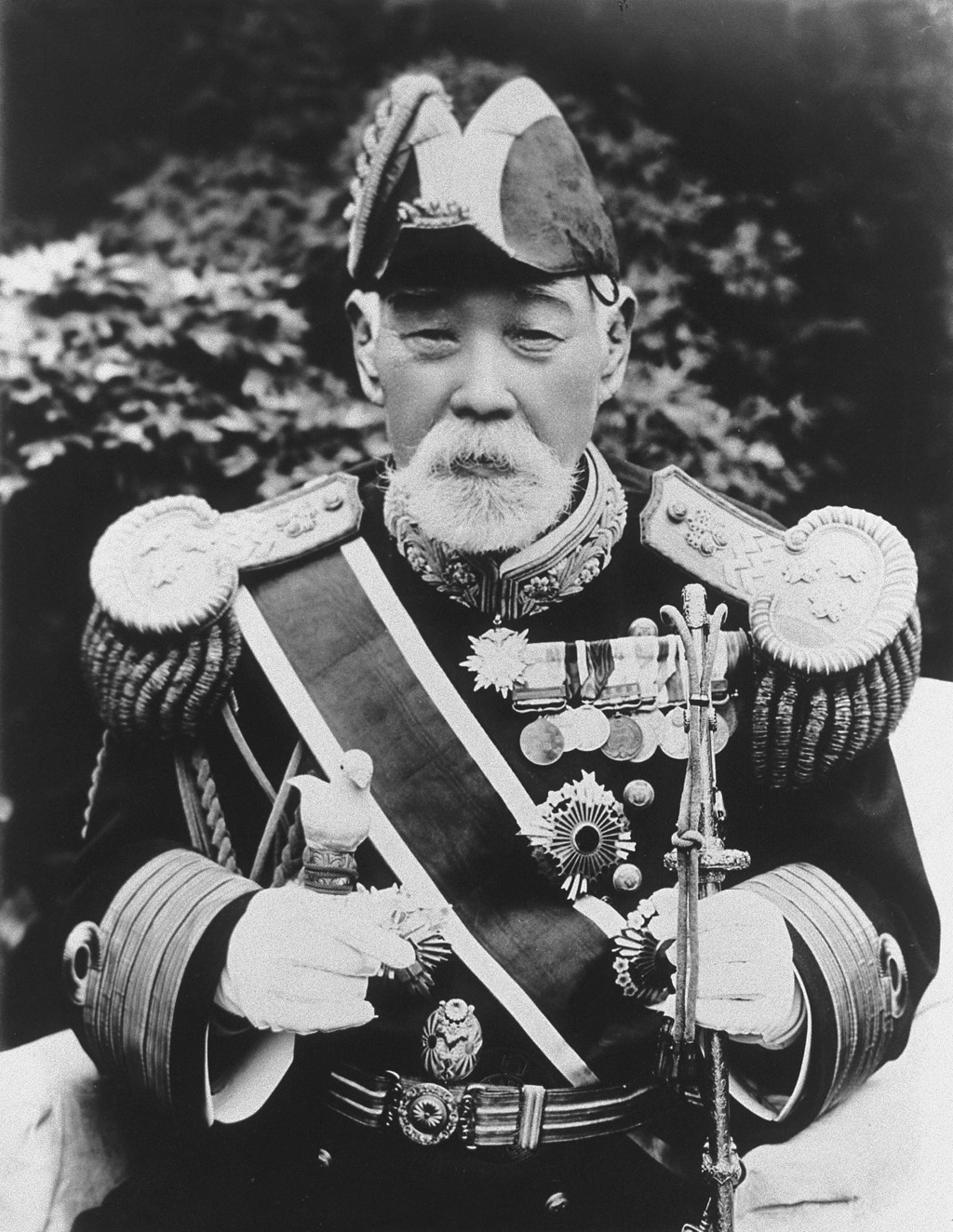
- Born: 1 December 1845; Kagoshima, Satsuma domain, Japan
- Died: 22 March 1929 (aged 83); Tokyo, Empire of Japan
- Spouse: Mitsuko (?) Ijuin (伊集院光子)
- Relatives: Shichiro Inoue (father, 井上七郎)
- Military career
- Allegiance: Empire of Japan
- Branch: Imperial Japanese Navy
- Service years: 1868–1911
- Rank: Marshal Admiral
- Commands: Un'yo; Seiki; Azuma; Asama; Fusō; Kongō; Imperial Japanese Navy Academy; Readiness Fleet; Sasebo Naval District; Kure Naval District; Yokosuka Naval District
- Conflicts: Anglo-Satsuma War; Boshin War; Ganghwa Island incident; Satsuma Rebellion; First Sino-Japanese War; Russo-Japanese War
- Awards: Order of the Sacred Treasure; Order of the Rising Sun; Order of the Chrysanthemum

Marshal Admiral Viscount Inoue Yoshika (井上 良馨, Yoshika Inoue; 1 December 1845 – 22 March 1929) was a career naval officer and admiral in the Imperial Japanese Navy during Meiji-period Japan.

== Early life ==
Inoue was born in Kagoshima as the eldest son of Inoue Shichirō, a retainer of the Satsuma Domain; his childhood name was Naohachi. He was not related to Vice Admiral Inoue Yoshitomo despite the similarity of their names, nor to the statesman Inoue Kaoru.

At around 19 or 20, Inoue took part in the Anglo-Satsuma War of 1863, serving under Nozu Shizuo at the Oki-Kojima gun battery near Sakurajima. British naval gunfire destroyed every battery position in the engagement, and Inoue was among nine Satsuma men killed or wounded there. A shell blast reportedly threw him roughly four metres and knocked him unconscious; he was badly wounded through the left thigh, and the sword he had been carrying was said to have been bent by the force of the blast. Local accounts credit this encounter with turning his ambitions toward the navy.

On recovery, he enlisted in the Satsuma navy. From 1868 he served as a junior officer aboard the Satsuma warship Kasuga under Itō Sukeyuki, a former student of Katsu Kaishū. He remained with Kasuga through the Boshin War, including the Battle of Awa-oki in January 1868, the Battle of Miyako Bay in March 1869, and the fighting around Hakodate that April and May.

== Early naval career ==
After the Meiji Restoration and the absorption of the various feudal navies into central government control, Inoue remained with Kasuga until the new government took direct ownership of Japan's warships in 1870, then transferred to the Ryūjō, being commissioned lieutenant in May 1871. He rose to executive officer by 1872 and was given his first command, again of Kasuga, that October. In October 1874 he took command of the gunboat Un'yo.

His promotions ran on almost the same schedule as Itō Sukeyuki's for roughly two decades, until the two men's careers diverged during the First Sino-Japanese War.

== Ganghwa Island incident ==
Inoue supported Seikanron, Saigō Takamori's hard-line policy toward Korea. As captain of Un'yo he carried out repeated live-fire drills and unauthorised coastal surveys as his ship and the gunboat Dai-Ni Teibo worked up the Korean coastline in 1875. On 20 September 1875, Un'yo approached Ganghwa Island, near the mouth of the Han River leading to the Korean capital, to search for fresh water; a landing party in ship's boats came under fire from a Korean shore battery. Un'yo returned fire, destroyed the battery the following day, and landed troops on nearby Yeongjong Island on 22 September, seizing 36 cannon and other weapons before withdrawing to Nagasaki. Korean accounts put Korean losses at more than 30 killed, against two Japanese wounded, one of whom later died.

The Meiji government used the Ganghwa Island incident as the basis for negotiations producing the Japan–Korea Treaty of 1876. A 2002 study of Inoue's surviving report drafts found that the account he submitted to the navy on 8 October 1875 differed in some particulars from an initial report he had written on 29 September, shortly after returning to Nagasaki; historians have used the discrepancy to question the precise sequence of events at Ganghwa. Inoue's superiors credited him with having repelled an unlawful attack, and his standing in the navy rose sharply as a result; one account of his career suggests the barony he received in 1886 was awarded partly in recognition of his role in the incident.

Inoue then took command of the new corvette Seiki, overseeing her construction as chief equipping officer; Seiki was the first warship built domestically in Japan.

== Satsuma Rebellion and voyage to Europe ==
Inoue admired Saigō Takamori but remained loyal to the Meiji government against his former Satsuma clansmen when the Satsuma Rebellion broke out in 1877. The rebellion was fought overwhelmingly by the army; the navy's role was largely confined to coastal transport and bombardment support, and Seiki, under Inoue's command, operated mainly off Miyazaki. Its most notable action came when Satsuma forces cut the land route between Nobeoka and Kagoshima, and Inoue's ship carried out an emergency sea transport of troops and supplies from Hoshima to Kagoshima.

In October 1877, Inoue took Seiki on a voyage to Europe and back, passing through the Suez Canal and calling at Constantinople, where he was received by the Ottoman Sultan, before reaching London. It was the first time a Japanese naval vessel had made the voyage under a Japanese captain, and the foreign press described it as a notable achievement for the young Japanese navy.

== Later naval career ==
On his return to Japan, Inoue captained a wide selection of ships, including the Azuma, Asama, Fusō and Kongō. He was promoted to commander in June 1882 and to rear admiral on 15 June 1886, and was appointed Director of the Bureau of Naval Affairs shortly thereafter. He was ennobled with the title of danshaku (baron) under the kazoku peerage system on 24 May 1887.

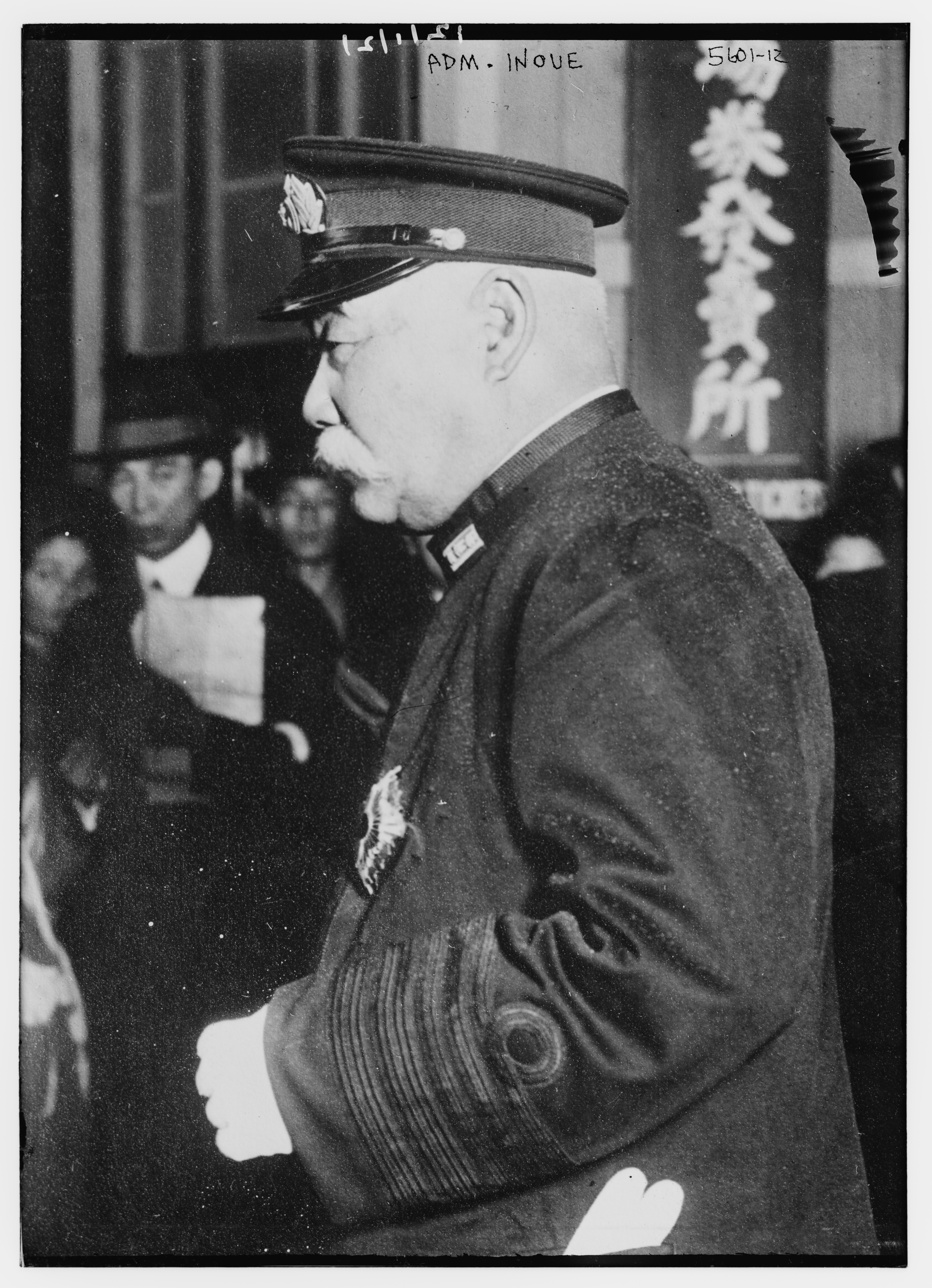
Marshal Admiral Viscount Inoue Yoshika, 1900

Inoue became first commandant of the Imperial Japanese Naval Academy on 16 August 1888. He became Commander-in-Chief of the Readiness Fleet on 29 July 1889 — the first fleet commander-in-chief in the history of the Japanese navy — and vice admiral and commander-in-chief of the Sasebo Naval District on 12 December 1892. He remained in charge of reserve and shore-based forces through the First Sino-Japanese War and did not see combat in that conflict; some later accounts note this as one reason his reputation never matched that of Itō Sukeyuki, who commanded the Combined Fleet during the war. He was commander-in-chief of the Kure Naval District from 26 February 1896 to 20 May 1900. In November 1900, he was awarded the Order of the Sacred Treasure, 1st class. Inoue was commander-in-chief of the Yokosuka Naval District from 20 May 1901 to 14 January 1905. He was promoted to admiral on 12 December 1901. In November 1905, he was awarded the Grand Cordon of the Order of the Rising Sun.

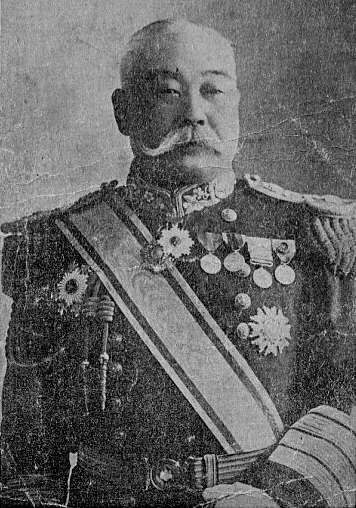
Marshal Admiral Viscount Inoue Yoshika

After the Russo-Japanese War, Inoue was elevated to shishaku (viscount) on 21 September 1907, and to the largely ceremonial rank of Marshal Admiral on his retirement on 31 October 1911. After retirement, Inoue continued to exert an influence on naval policy, and was a strong proponent of the occupation and annexation of the Caroline Islands during World War I.

== Personal life and death ==
Inoue spoke only in the Kagoshima dialect throughout his life, never adopting standard Japanese even in his later, highly public career. He died in Tokyo in 1929. His last wish was to be buried somewhere with a clear view of Oki-Kojima, the islet off Sakurajima where he had nearly been killed during the Anglo-Satsuma War; his family honoured the request, and his grave stands at Gōriamoto in Kagoshima, on high ground overlooking the island.

Inoue had wished for his viscountcy to lapse with his own death rather than pass to his descendants. His son Tora overturned this wish after Inoue's death and completed the formal procedures to inherit the title, but a series of scandals involving the family — including the sale of Inoue's ceremonial marshal's sword — eventually forced the family to renounce the peerage.

== Decorations ==
=== Dates of rank ===
- June 25, 1873 (Meiji 6) -- Junior Sixth Rank
- May 25, 1876 (Meiji 9) -- Sixth Rank
- October 28, 1886 (Meiji 19) -- Junior Fourth Rank
- February 13, 1892 (Meiji 25) -- Senior Fourth Rank
- September 20, 1898 (Meiji 31) -- Third rank
- December 27, 1901 (Meiji 34) -- Senior Third Rank
- February 1, 1907 (Meiji 40) -- Second rank
- February 20, 1914 (Taisho 3) -- Senior Second Rank
- March 22, 1929—Junior First Rank

=== Medals, etc. ===
- November 19, 1885 -- The Order of the Rising Sun, Gold Rays
- November 25, 1889 (Meiji 22) -- The Commemorative Medal for the Imperial Constitution Promulgation
- November 29, 1893 (Meiji 26) -- Order of the Sacred Treasure

1895 (Meiji 28)

- November 18 -- Military Medal of Honor
- November 21 -- Order of the Rising Sun, 2nd Class (Jūkōshō)
- November 30, 1900 (Meiji 33) -- The Order of the Sacred Treasure
- November 30, 1905 (Meiji 38) -- Grand Cordon of the Order of the Rising Sun
- April 1, 1906 (Meiji 39) -- Order of the Golden Kite, Second Class
- September 21, 1907 (Meiji 40) -- Viscount
- October 31, 1911 (Meiji 44) -- Gensui Marshal, Marshal Emblem

1915 (Taisho 4)

- November 7 -- A pair of gold cups, Military Medal of Honor in 1914
- November 10—Enthronement Commemorative Medal (Taiten kinenshō; identification tentative, unconfirmed against a primary source)
- November 1, 1920 (Taisho 9) -- Grand Cordon of the Order of the Rising Sun with Paulownia Flowers, awarded for Taishō 3rd–9th year service
- March 22, 1929 -- Grand Cordon of the Supreme Chrysanthemum

Military offices
Post Created	Naval War College; Headmaster; 16 August 1888 - 15 May 1889	Succeeded by Itō Sukeyuki
Preceded by Itō Sukeyuki	Small Standing Fleet; Commander-in-chief; 17 May 1889 - 29 July 1889	Fleet Dissolved
Fleet Created	Standing Fleet; Commander-in-chief; 29 July 1889 - 17 June 1891	Succeeded by Arichi Shinanojō
Preceded by Arichi Shinanojō	Navy General Staff; Chairman; 17 June 1891 – 12 December 1892	Succeeded by Nakamuta Kuranosuke
Preceded by Abo Kiyoyasu	Sasebo Naval District; Commander-in-chief; 12 December 1892 - 20 May 1893	Succeeded by Aiura Norimichi
Preceded by Itō Sukeyuki	Yokosuka Naval District; Commander-in-chief; 20 May 1893 - 16 February 1895	Succeeded by Aiura Norimichi
Preceded by Aiura Norimichi	Western Sea Fleet; Commander-in-chief; 16 February 1895 - 15 November 1895	Fleet Dissolved
Preceded by Arichi Shinanojō	Standing Fleet; Commander-in-chief; 15 November 1895 - 26 February 1896	Succeeded by Tsuboi Kōzō
Preceded by Abo Kiyoyasu	Kure Naval District; Commander-in-chief; 26 February 1896 - 20 May 1900	Succeeded by Shibayama Yahachi
Preceded by Aiura Norimichi	Yokosuka Naval District; Commander-in-chief; 20 May 1900 - 20 December 1905	Succeeded by Kamimura Hikonojō
