= Goryeo missions to Imperial China =

Goryeo missions to Imperial China were the diplomatic ventures of Kingdom of Goryeo which were intermittently sent in the years 918–1392, representing a significant aspect of the international relations of mutual Goryeon-Chinese contacts and communication.

A cautious diplomacy was the foreign policy of the Kingdom of Goryeo up through its demise in 1392. Evolving Korean historiography during the reign of Seongjong of Joseon, emphasized that its theoretical and functional foundations were rooted in Confucian scholar-bureaucrats, institutions and philosophy.

== Goryeon diplomacy ==
Strife during the years of transition between the Yuan dynasty and the Ming dynasty in China were difficult for Goryeo; as were the years of transition which preceded the Yuan. During the reign of Wonjong, Goryeo was tributary of the Yuan, sending 36 tributary missions to the Yuan court between 1264 and 1294.

In the autumn of 1384, Chŏng Mong-ju led the Goryeo mission to Nanjing for the celebration of the Ming emperor's birthday.

During the reign of the Hongwu Emperor, envoys from Goryeo were rejected before the mid-1380s.

== List of Goryeo diplomatic envoys ==
- Sŏ Hŭi
- Yi Ja-ryang
- Chŏng Mong-ju, (1337–1392)

== See also ==
- Goryeo missions to Japan
- Joseon missions to Imperial China
