= Bonto =

- Location in Senegal
- Coordinates: 12°52′N 16°03′W
- Country: Senegal
- Time zone: UTC+0 (GMT)

Bonto is a settlement in the Zinguinchor Region of Senegal. It has an elevation of approximately 29 meters (98 feet) above sea level.
