= Pak Kyusu =

Korean scholar-bureaucrat (1807–1877)

Pak Kyusu 박규수
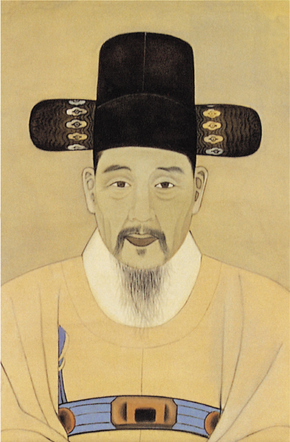

Right State Councillor
- In office 19 January 1874 – 4 November 1874
- Preceded by: Han Gye-won
- Succeeded by: Kim Byeong-guk

Personal details
- Born: 27 October 1807 Gahoe-dong, Hansŏng, Joseon
- Died: 9 February 1877 (aged 69) Suwon-gun, Gyeonggi Province, Joseon
- Spouse: Lady Yi of the Yeonan Yi clan (연안 이씨)
- Relations: Pak Chonch'ae (father); Lady Yu (mother)
- Children: Pak Cheŭng

Korean name
- Hangul: 박규수
- Hanja: 朴珪壽
- RR: Bak Gyusu
- MR: Pak Kyusu

Pak Kyusu (Korean: 박규수; 1807–1877) was a scholar-bureaucrat, teacher, politician, and a diplomat of the Joseon period. He was known as a pioneer of the enlightenment group. Pak Kyusu was the grandson of Pak Chiwŏn, the great Silhak scholar. He was also known by the names of Hwanjae (환재; 瓛齋), Hwanjae (환재; 桓齋), Hŏnjae (헌재; 獻齋), and Hwanjaegŏsa (환재거사; 瓛齋居士).

== Biography ==
In 1827, Pak Kyusu met Crown Prince Hyomyeong who quickly became a trusted friend. The Crown Prince would often ask Pak for his thoughts on delicate political and social issues. When the Crown Prince died three years later at the age of 20, Pak fell into a deep state of mourning. Due to this, Pak isolated himself from the outside world for twenty years.

In 1848, he successfully passed the Gwageo civil service exam, a test required for government work. Doing well on this test allowed Pak Kyusu to acquire a well-paid job early on. Later in his life, Pak became a mentor for a Korean politician Pak Yŏnghyo during the mid-1870s. Pak Kyusu decided to instruct Pak Yŏnghyo in his ways of enlightened thinking after he took initiative and sought the politician out. Pak Kyusu's ideas influenced many throughout Korea, the most notable being the Korean reformist Kim Okgyun, who went on to incorporate foreign sciences and technologies into Korea in an attempt to strengthen it against further military advances by the rapidly technologically developing Meiji Japan.

During the period of King Gojong's reign, the Queen actively supported him. Queen Sinjeong had been the wife of Crown Prince Hyomyeong, who was posthumously named King Munjo. Pak Kyusu was the governor of Pyongan province when the General Sherman incident occurred, an event commonly cited as a factor important to the end of Korean isolationism in the 19th century. On the 9th of July 1866, the General Sherman entered the Keupsa Gate without permission. Pak gave the General Sherman's crew a warning to depart from Joseon. The ship's crew ignored his warning and captured the messenger adjutant-general Yi Hyon-Ik, a subordinate of Pak Kyusu. Pak was present during the rescue of Yi and the destruction of the General Sherman on the 24th of July 1866. In 1872 Pak Kyusu was made the Joseon Chief Envoy to the court of the Tongzhi Emperor.

== Known works ==
- Hwanjaejip(환재집 瓛齋集)
- Hwanjaejikgye(환재직계 瓛齋織啓)
- Hwanjaesyugye(환재수계 瓛齋繡啓)
- Geogajapbokgo(거가잡복고 居家雜服攷)
- Sanggodohoimunuirye(상고도회문의례 尙古圖會文儀例)
- Jangammungo(장암문고 莊菴文稿)
- Hwanjaeyugo(환재유고 瓛齋遺稿)
