= Basketball at the 1996 Summer Olympics – Men's team rosters =

Olympic basketball rosters

Twelve men's teams competed in basketball at the 1996 Summer Olympics.

== Group A ==
=== Angola ===
The following players represented Angola:

- Edmar Victoriano
- Aníbal Moreira
- Ângelo Victoriano
- Benjamim Ucuahamba
- Honorato Trosso
- Víctor de Carvalho
- Herlander Coimbra
- Justino Victoriano
- David Dias
- Benjamim João Romano
- José Carlos Guimarães

=== Argentina ===
The following players represented Argentina:

- Marcelo Nicola
- Daniel Farabello
- Luis Villar
- Esteban De la Fuente
- Ernesto Michel
- Marcelo Milanesio
- Juan Espil
- Diego Osella
- Fabricio Oberto
- Jorge Racca
- Esteban Pérez
- Rubén Wolkowyski

=== China ===
The following players represented China:

- Mengke Bateer
- Gong Xiaobin
- Hu Weidong
- Li Nan
- Li Xiaoyong
- Liu Yudong
- Shan Tao
- Sun Jun
- Wang Zhizhi
- Wu Naiqun
- Wu Qinglong
- Zheng Wu

=== Croatia ===
The following players represented Croatia:

- Arijan Komazec
- Damir Mulaomerović
- Davor Marcelić
- Dino Rađa
- Josip Vranković
- Slaven Rimac
- Stojko Vranković
- Toni Kukoč
- Velimir Perasović
- Veljko Mršić
- Vladan Alanović
- Žan Tabak

=== Lithuania ===
The following players represented Lithuania:

- Artūras Karnišovas
- Arvydas Sabonis
- Darius Lukminas
- Eurelijus Žukauskas
- Gintaras Einikis
- Mindaugas Žukauskas
- Rimas Kurtinaitis
- Rytis Vaišvila
- Šarūnas Marčiulionis
- Saulius Štombergas
- Tomas Pačėsas

=== United States ===
The following players represented the United States:

- Penny Hardaway
- Charles Barkley
- David Robinson
- Gary Payton
- Grant Hill
- Hakeem Olajuwon
- John Stockton
- Karl Malone
- Mitch Richmond
- Reggie Miller
- Scottie Pippen
- Shaquille O'Neal

== Group B ==
=== Australia ===
The following players represented Australia:

- Andrew Gaze
- Andrew Vlahov
- Brett Maher
- John Dorge
- Mark Bradtke
- Pat Reidy
- Ray Borner
- Sam Mackinnon
- Scott Fisher
- Shane Heal
- Tonny Jensen
- Tony Ronaldson

=== Brazil ===
The following players represented Brazil:

- André Luís Guimarães Fonseca
- Antônio José Nogueira Santana
- Aristides Josuel dos Santos
- Caio Eduardo de Mello Cazziolato
- Caio da Silveira
- Carlos Henrique Rodrigues do Nascimento
- Demétrius Conrado Ferraciú
- João Vianna
- Joélcio Joerke
- Oscar Schmidt
- Rogério Klafke
- Wilson Minucci

=== Greece ===
The following players represented Greece:

- Kostas Patavoukas
- Pap Papanikolaou
- Dinos Angelidis-Khronis
- Efthimis Bakatsias
- Efthimios Rentzias
- Lefteris Kakiousis
- Frankie Alvertis
- Giorgos Sigalas
- Nikos Oikonomou
- Panagiotis Fasoulas
- Panagiotis Giannakis
- Fanis Christodoulou

=== Puerto Rico ===
The following players represented Puerto Rico:

- José Rafael Ortíz
- Joël Curbelo
- Pablo Alicea
- Richard Soto
- Jerome Mincy
- Eddie Rivera
- Carmelo Travieso
- Juan Ramón Rivas
- Edgar Padilla
- Eugenio Soto
- Daniel Santiago
- Georgie Torres

=== South Korea ===
The following players represented South Korea:

- Lee Sang-min
- Gang Dong-hui
- Yang Hui-seung
- Hyeon Ju-yeop
- Heo Jae
- Mun Gyeong-eun
- O Seong-sik
- Jo Dong-gi
- Jeon Hui-cheol
- Jeong Jae-geun
- Jeong Gyeong-ho

=== FR Yugoslavia ===
The following players represented FR Yugoslavia:

- Saša Đorđević
- Dejan Bodiroga
- Dejan Tomašević
- Milenko Topić
- Miroslav Berić
- Nikola Lončar
- Predrag Danilović
- Saša Obradović
- Vlade Divac
- Žarko Paspalj
- Željko Rebrača
- Zoran Savić
