= Jo Eom =

Korean scholar-official (1719–1777)

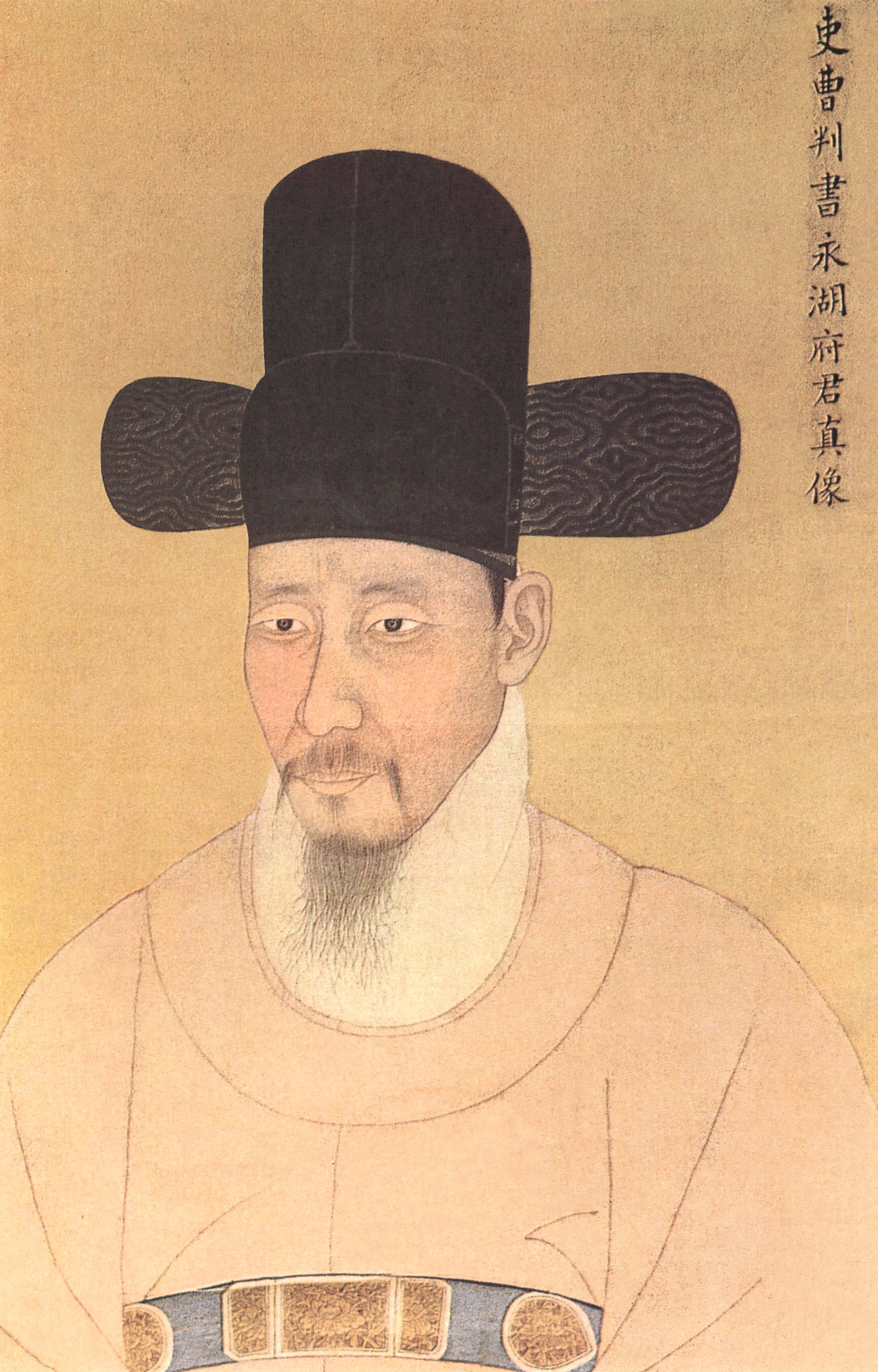

Korean name
- Hangul: 조엄
- Hanja: 趙曮
- RR: Jo Eom
- MR: Cho Ŏm

Art name
- Hangul: 영호
- Hanja: 永湖
- RR: Yeongho
- MR: Yŏngho

Courtesy name
- Hangul: 명서
- Hanja: 明瑞
- RR: Myeongseo
- MR: Myŏngsŏ

Posthumous name
- Hangul: 문익
- RR: Munik
- MR: Munik

Jo Eom (Korean: 조엄; Hanja: 趙曮; 1719–1777) was a Korean civil minister (munsin) in the 18th century during the late Joseon Dynasty.

He was also diplomat and ambassador, representing Joseon interests to the Tokugawa shogunate in Japan. He is credited with introducing the cultivation of potatoes as a food staple in Korea in the mid-18th century.

== Biography ==
Jo Eom was of the Pungyang Jo clan, and his father was Jo Sang-gyeong with the title of Ijo panseo (a Minister of Personnel, 이조판서, 吏曹判書). He later married a half-aunt of Lady Hyegyeong and became the great-grandfather to the future Queen Shinjeong through his eldest son.

In 1738, he passed saengwonsi, the state examination, with a low grade. In 1752, he passed high grade examination (Jeongsi) and served for the government as the Jeongeon (정언; 正言), and became Gyori (교리; 校理), administrator of Dongnae and Amhaengeosa (Secret governmental inspectors) of Chungcheong province in 1757. In 1760, he suggested to established three Jochang (조창, 漕倉, storehouse) in southern Gyeongsang province, which contributed to the economic development of the region. He also became Daesaheon (대사헌; 大司憲), Bujehak (부제학; 副提學) and Yejo chamui (예조참의; 禮曹參議).

King Yeongjo sent a diplomatic mission to Japan (Joseon Tongsinsa) in 1764. This embassy to the court of Tokugawa Ieharu was led by Jo Eom. This diplomatic mission functioned to the advantage of both the Japanese and the Koreans as a channel for developing a political foundation for bilateral trade. He brought in a foreign crop, the sweet potato, and grew it in Dongnae and Jeju Island.

He was appointed Uigeumbu jisa (의금부지사; 義禁府知事), Ijo panseo and Jehak (제학; 提學). Soon after that, he became Pyongando Gwanchalsa, the governor of Pyongan province.

After his return to court, Jo Eom was appointed Daesagan (대사간; 大司諫) and Ijo panseo. In 1777, he was entrapped and banished to Wiwon, northern Pyongan region, by Hong Guk-yeong's faction. Later, he was transferred to Gimhae, southern Gyeongsang region, and died there.

Jo's writings and memoirs are preserved in the Haesa ilgi (Diary of Overseas Mission, 해사일기, 海槎日記) and Haehaeng chongjae (해행총재; 海行摠載).

== Family ==
- Father - Jo Sang-gyeong (조상경; 趙尙絅; 1690–?)
- Mother - Lady Yi of the Bupyeong Yi clan (정경부인 부평 이씨; 1690–?)
- Sibling(s)
  - Older brother - Jo Don (조돈; 趙暾; 1716–1790)
  - Younger brother - Jo Jeong (조정; 趙晸; 1725–?)
- Wife - Lady Hong of the Pungsan Hong clan (증 정경부인 풍산 홍씨; 1719–1808)
- Issue
  - Son - Jo Jin-gwan (조진관; 趙鎭寬; 1739–1808)
    - Daughter-in-law - Lady Hong of the Namyang Hong clan (남양 홍씨; 南陽 洪氏; 1739–1799); daughter of Hong Ik-bin (홍익빈; 洪益彬)
      - Granddaughter - Lady Jo of the Pungyang Jo clan (풍양 조씨; 豊壤 趙氏; 1764–?)
      - Granddaughter - Lady Jo of the Pungyang Jo clan (풍양 조씨; 豊壤 趙氏; 1767–?)
      - Granddaughter - Lady Jo of the Pungyang Jo clan (풍양 조씨; 豊壤 趙氏; 1770–?)
      - Granddaughter - Lady Jo of the Pungyang Jo clan (풍양 조씨; 豊壤 趙氏; 1773–?)
      - Grandson - Jo Man-yeong (조만영; 趙萬永; 1776–1846)
      - Grandson - Jo Won-yeong (조원영; 趙原永; 1779–1825); became the adopted son of his uncle Jo Jin-ui (조진의; 趙鎭宜)
      - Grandson - Jo In-yeong (조인영; 趙寅永; 1782–1850)
  - Son - Jo Jin-ui (조진의; 趙鎭宜; 1742–?)
    - Adoptive Grandson - Jo Won-yeong (조원영; 趙原永; 1779–1825); son of Jo Jin-gwan
  - Daughter - Lady Jo (조씨; 1746–?)
  - Daughter - Lady Jo (조씨)

== See also ==
- List of Joseon Dynasty people
- Joseon Tongsinsa

Preceded by Hong Gye-hui	Joseon–Japanese; Edo period diplomacy 11th mission 1764	Succeeded by Kim Igyo
