= Omniscient Reader: The Prophecy =

2025 film by Kim Byung-woo

- Theatrical release poster
- Hangul: 전지적 독자 시점
- RR: Jeonjijeok dokja sijeom
- MR: Chŏnjijŏk tokcha sichŏm
- Directed by: Kim Byung-woo
- Screenplay by: Kim Byung-woo; Lee Jeong-min
- Based on: Omniscient Reader's Viewpoint by sinNsong
- Produced by: Won Dong-yeon; Jung Moon-goo
- Starring: Lee Min-ho; Ahn Hyo-seop; Chae Soo-bin; Shin Seung-ho; Nana; Jisoo; Kwon Eun-seong
- Cinematography: Jeon Hye-jin
- Edited by: Han Mi-yeon
- Music by: Mowg
- Production companies: Realies Pictures; Smilegate; MYM Entertainment; The Present Company
- Distributed by: Lotte Entertainment
- Release date: July 23, 2025
- Running time: 117 minutes
- Country: South Korea
- Language: Korean
- Budget: US$21 million
- Box office: US$9.2 million

Omniscient Reader: The Prophecy (Korean: 전지적 독자 시점) is a 2025 South Korean action fantasy film directed by Kim Byung-woo, starring Lee Min-ho, Ahn Hyo-seop, Chae Soo-bin, Shin Seung-ho, Nana, Jisoo and Kwon Eun-seong. It is adapted from the best-selling web novel Omniscient Reader's Viewpoint by Sing Shong. The film was released in South Korea on July 23, 2025.

== Plot ==
On his last day as a contract office worker at Minosoft, Kim Dok-ja, the sole reader of the web novel Three Ways to Survive the Apocalypse (TWSA), finishes the final chapter, where protagonist Yoo Joong-hyuk survives alone after the death of his comrades and all of humanity. Disappointed, Dok-ja writes a critical review to the author "tls123". While riding the subway home with his colleague Yoo Sang-ah, he receives a message from the author suggesting he write a new ending himself.

At 7:00 p.m., the train halts and a dokkaebi named Bi-hyeong appears, announcing that humanity must face scenarios imposed by constellations, beginning with the command to kill one or more living organisms. Realizing the situation mirrors the novel's first episode, Dok-ja kills an ant from a boy named Lee Gil-yeong's insect box to survive. Though he tries to help others, panic leads to bloodshed. As the scenario ends, only Dok-ja, Sang-ah, Gil-yeong, and 14 others survive. All are prompted to choose a sponsor, but Dok-ja refuses.

When the train is attacked by a monster, soldier Lee Hyeon-seong, who is one of Joong-hyuk's comrades in the novel, helps Dok-ja and the others escape. Dok-ja sees Joong-hyuk fighting and proposes an alliance to change his fate, knowing Joong-hyuk will die fighting the Fire Dragon. Joong-hyuk refuses and throws Dok-ja off the bridge, where he's swallowed by an ichthyosaur. Inside, Dok-ja strikes a deal with Bi-hyeong to earn coins and uses thorns from the dokkaebi shop to kill the beast. He trades its nucleus for a rare item, the Ether of Faith.

After stopping at a convenience store, Dok-ja saves Jeong Hui-won, a minor character who originally died in the novel. They escape a monster and regroup at Geumho Station with Sang-ah, Hyeon-seong, and Gil-yeong. There, the scenario is to kill all monsters or pay a daily coin fee to survive. Congressman Cheon In-ho, a main antagonist in the novel, urges Dok-ja to share his coins, but Dok-ja sees through his deception. Dok-ja's group, joined by Hui-won, learns In-ho and his men have been killing others for coins. After Sang-ah is kidnapped by a Ground Rat, Dok-ja kills it using White Star Pure Energy and rescues her and Hyeon-seong, who was trapped in an Illusory Prison by his trauma of witnessing a fellow soldier's death by a grenade accident.

The group receives new weapons. Dok-ja gets a broken sword, "Broken Faith", which needs the Ether of Faith to become complete. His knowledge of the novel raises suspicion, so he lies, claiming he has prophetic powers. He tells the group they must prevent Joong-hyuk's death at Chungmu-ro. But first, they must kill the final Geumho monster — In-ho himself, who became a monster by sacrificing his humanity to the constellations. Though he crosses into Chungmu-ro, he is killed at the last second by Lee Ji-hye, Joong-hyuk's apprentice, saving Dok-ja's group.

At Chungmu-ro, the scenario requires survivors to enter limited green zones each round or be killed by monsters. Dok-ja finds a hidden bonus zone but gives it to Gil-yeong, refusing Joong-hyuk's demand to let the boy die. Dok-ja eats a crystal from the Ground Rat and is pulled into the Illusory Prison, confronting a traumatic high school memory: he was forced by the bullies to fight his only friend Ahn Min-seop and win in order to avoid being bullied, and it led to Min-seop's suicide. He once told the TWSA author he wanted an ending where the protagonist survives with his comrades. Joong-hyuk, speaking through his Dream Conversation ability, rebuffs Dok-ja's idealistic hopes, stating that he used to harbour the same beliefs before the dark side of humanity and loss of his comrades led to him coming to realize that humanity cannot be trusted to help each other and it was easier to fight alone for his own survival.

Upon awakening, Dok-ja finds his teammates protected him and survived without the green zones. He now believes they can survive together and decides to fight the Fire Dragon without sacrificing Joong-hyuk. When only one green zone is given to Gong Pil-du, who owns the most coins, Dok-ja offers to buy it. Ji-hye initially refuses to help, choosing to survive alone, but breaks down after Dok-ja confronts her about murdering her best friend in the first scenario. With 113,000 coins, Dok-ja buys and destroys Pil-du's green zone with Ji-hye's help, urging everyone to survive together and also pays Pil-du 100,000 coins, wanting him to protect the other survivors.

Pil-du, conflicted but moved, agrees to help and fights alongside Dok-ja's team. When the Fire Dragon appears, the group attempts a coordinated attack: Dok-ja breaks its shell, Sang-ah restrains it, and Hui-won pierces the core to earn the "King of No Killing" ability that can revive Dok-ja, because breaking the shell will lead to Dok-ja's death. But Joong-hyuk dies before the plan succeeds. As the world begins to collapse, Dok-ja receives the notification that his ichthyosaur nucleus is successfully traded in exchange for the Ether of Faith, with the trade initiated by none other than the TWSA author "tls123". Dok-ja merges it with Broken Faith to create an Attribute Weapon, kills the Fire Dragon, and revives Joong-hyuk with the King of No Killing, saving the world.

Joong-hyuk looks at Dok-ja with gratitude as they and the others celebrate their victory. Dok-ja now aims to write a new ending with the help of his comrades.

In a mid-credits scene, Han Myeong-oh, the former superior of Dok-ja, arrives, revealing that Geumho has been destroyed and all survivors except him are dead. As the group prepares for the next scenario, a mysterious train sound echoes in the distance.

== Cast ==
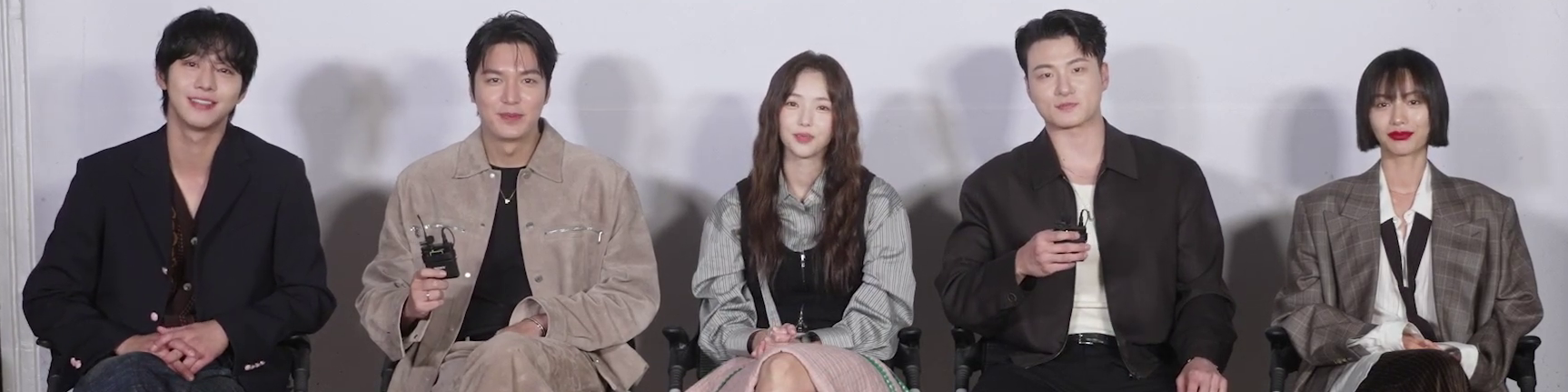
The main cast. From left to right: Ahn, Lee, Chae, Shin, and Nana.

- Lee Min-ho as Yoo Joong-hyuk, a cold and powerful regressor who fights to the end in each timeline
- Ahn Hyo-seop as Kim Dok-ja, a lone reader who becomes the key to saving the collapsing world
- Chae Soo-bin as Yoo Sang-ah, Kim Dok-ja's former co-worker and strong ally in the new world
- Shin Seung-ho as Lee Hyun-sung, a former soldier with remarkable defensive strength
- Nana as Jung Hee-won, a justice-driven fighter with fierce skills
- Jisoo as Lee Ji-hye, a resilient warrior who stands by Yoo Joong-hyuk in battle
- Kwon Eun-seong as Lee Gil-young
- Park Ho-san as Gong Pil-du
- Choi Young-joon as Han Myeong-oh
- Jung Sung-il as Cheon In-ho

== Production ==
=== Development ===
Omniscient Reader's Viewpoint is one of the most popular Korean web novels on the platform Munpia, known for its complex world-building and narrative structure that blends fantasy, dystopia, and psychological elements. Since its publication, the series has received critical and commercial success, prompting demands for live-action adaptations. In April 2019, Munpia CEO Kim Hwan-cheol announced that Omniscient Reader's Viewpoint was being prepared for a screen adaptation following its massive success with over 10 million cumulative views.

In 2023, director Kim Byung-woo was confirmed to lead the project, and the screenplay began development under the supervision of Realies Pictures, known for large-scale genre films. The adaptation aimed to preserve the original's layered structure while making the story accessible to a broader international audience.

=== Filming ===
Principal photography began on December 5, 2023, and wrapped in late May 2024 after a six-month shoot that included large-scale sets and CGI sequences.

== Marketing ==
A teaser poster and official trailer were unveiled on February 15, 2025, showcasing the high-concept fantasy elements, action sequences, and dramatic tone. The film's promotional campaign highlights the tension between fate and free will, mirroring the original novel's philosophical themes.

== Release ==
The film premiered in South Korean theaters on July 23, 2025, distributed by Lotte Entertainment (also Distributed Korean-Based Branch in Vietnam), with international distribution by Purple Plan in Singapore, Malaysia and Indonesia; Sahamongkol Films in Thailand, Westec Media in Cambodia and Viewer Choices in Philippines.

== Reception ==
=== Critical response ===
On the review aggregator website Rotten Tomatoes, 25% of 12 critics' reviews are positive.

Elizabeth Kerr of Screen International described Omniscient Reader: The Prophecy as an "old-fashioned creature feature" that delivers on its promises but suffers from a "muddled plot and murky internal logic" and a "starry but unchallenged cast". John Lui of The Straits Times gave the film 2/5 stars and commended its "flashy visuals and game mechanics", but criticized it for lacking coherence due to "muddled storytelling and hollow character dynamics". James Marsh of the South China Morning Post also rated the film 2/5 stars and remarked that "it is impossible to conceive that a feature film like this would exist without the success of Train to Busan and Squid Game".

Cho Jiyoung of The Chosun Ilbo found the film exciting and visually impressive, with innovative ideas and strong performances, especially from Ahn Hyo-seop, but notes that it may face challenges in satisfying both "original fans and middle-aged audiences". Jang Ju-yeon of Ilgan Sports described the film as "groundbreaking" and praised how it "faithfully adopts the original's worldview and game narrative" with "significant sense of fun and immersion". Choi Song-hee of Aju Business Daily wrote that, while the film "do not fully resonate with fans of the original" and "beloved scenes or details are missing", "the core of the story remains unshaken" and serves as "a sufficiently friendly introduction for audiences encountering this world for the first time". Lee Woo-sang of The Korea Economic Daily was also critical of the film, suggesting that despite moments of improvement, it fails to capture the depth of the original web novel and does not fully realize its potential as a compelling adaptation.

=== Accolades ===
Award	Date of ceremony	Category	Recipient(s)	Result	Ref.
Baeksang Arts Awards	May 8, 2026	Best New Actor	Ahn Hyo-seop	Nominated	
Baeksang Arts Awards	May 8, 2026	Best Technical Achievement	Jung Sung-jin and Kim Woo-chul (VFX)	Nominated	
Blue Dragon Film Awards	November 19, 2025	Best New Actor	Ahn Hyo-seop	Nominated	
Blue Dragon Film Awards	November 19, 2025	Technical Award	Kim Woo-chul (VFX)	Nominated	
