= Eugenio Soto =

Eugenio Soto can refer to:

- Eugenio Soto (basketball)
- Eugenio Soto (footballer)
