= Pungyang Jo clan =

Korean clan from Gyeonggi Province

Pungyang Cho Clan
- Family Seal of the Pungyang Cho clan
- Country: Korea
- Current region: Namyangju, Gyeonggi Province
- Founder: Cho Maeng
- Connected members: Queen Hyosun; Jo Eom; Jo Man-yeong; Queen Sinjeong; Jo Mun-myeong; Royal Consort Gwiin Jo; Jo Sang-gyeong
- Website: poongyangcho.com

The Pungyang Cho clan (Korean: 풍양 조씨; Hanja: 豐壤 趙氏) is a Korean clan that traces its origin to Namyangju, Gyeonggi Province. According to the 2015 Korean census, the clan has 124,262 members.

== Origin ==
Cho Maeng (조맹; 趙孟), who was originally known by the name of Pa-u (바우; lit. 'rock'), was born and raised in Pungyang-hyeon (currently Songneung-ri, Jingeon-eup, Namyangju, Gyeonggi Province) and lived as a Taoist hermit in seclusion in a rock cave at the foot of Mt. Cheonmasan.

When Wang Kŏn, who was invading Silla at that time, was defeated by the Silla army in the battle of Yeonghae (now Yeongdeok, North Gyeongsang Province), his generals recommended to him Pa-u, who lived in Pungyang-hyeon, as a strategist.

When Wang Kŏn found him, he was 70 years old at the time. From this time on, as he conquered Silla and achieved the unification of the three kingdoms with great ingenuity and bravery, Wang Kŏn, now King Taejo, gave the name Cho Maeng to Pa-u, for his talents.

Cho Maeng was then given the positions of supreme chancellor (문하시중; 門下侍中; munha sijung) and p'yŏngjangsa (평장사; 平章事). It is said that the cave in Mt. Cheonmasan in which he lived in is said to where he had met Wang Kŏn, and Hyeonseongam was built to protect it.

Cho Maeng eventually had descendants: Cho Chi-rin (조지린; 趙之藺), Cho Sin-hyŏk (조신혁; 趙臣赫), and Cho Po (조보; 趙寶). His three descendants eventually made him the progenitor of the Pungyang Cho clan.

The Pungyang Cho clan, along with the (new) Andong Kim clan and the Yeoheung Min clan, are one of the three families that brought their influence towards the end of the Joseon Dynasty.

== Late Joseon Dynasty ==
The clan was a prominent yangban family during Korea's late Joseon dynasty.

Five Jongmyo scholars, and 2 Prime Ministers, Cho Hyŏnmyŏng and Cho Inyŏng, were produced. A Crown Princess who was posthumously honored as Queen, Queen Hyosun (the wife of Crown Prince Hyojang) and another Crown Princess who was posthumously honored as Queen Dowager, Queen Sinjeong (the wife of Crown Prince Hyomyeong).

Princess Consort Uichun (Prince Bongan's wife) and Princess Consort Muncheon (Prince Yangwon's wife), as well as two Royal Consorts, Royal Consort Gwi-in (a concubine of King Yeongjo) and Royal Consort Gwi-in (a concubine of King Cheoljong) were members of the royal family.

In 1834, the Cho clan seized control over the royal court from the Andong Kim clan. The clan rose to prominence, pushing out the Andong Kim clan that had wielded power since the King Sunjo regime. However, with the death of the clan leader Jo Man-yeong in 1846, control of the kingdom once again fell into the hands of the Andong Kim clan.

Anti-Catholic in nature, the Cho clan dominated the court when King Heonjeong blamed the Kim clan for being soft on Catholics and launched a persecution, killing hundreds of Catholics, including three French missionary priests.

Queen Sinjeong eventually took power as regent when her son Heonjong became king following the untimely death of Crown Prince Hyomyeong.

The Pungyang Cho clan saw that Yi Myeong-bok (later Emperor Gojong) was only twelve years old and would not be able to rule in his own name until he came of age, and that they could easily influence Yi Ha-eung, who would be acting as regent for the future king. As soon as news of Cheoljong's death reached Yi Ha-eung through his intricate network of spies in the palace, he and the Pungyang Cho clan took the hereditary royal seal — an object that was considered necessary for a legitimate reign to take place and aristocratic recognition to be received — effectively giving her absolute power to select the successor to the throne. By the time Cheoljong's death had become a known fact, the Andong Kim clan was powerless according to Royal law as the seal lay in the hands of the Grand Royal Dowager Queen Sinjeong.

When the Grand Queen Dowager stepped down from regency, Grand Internal Prince Heungseon had driven out the influence of the Cho clan. Which eventually brought in Queen Min's intervention as she became involved in Royal politics. Thus bringing down the power of the king's father and his supporters, and bringing in her family's power, the Yeoheung Min clan.

== Notable people ==
- Cho Nam-chul — South Korean go player
- Zhao Nanqi — Korean Chinese general
- Cho Soon — South Korean politician
- Cho Chung-yun — South Korean football player and manager
- Cho Keung-yeon — South Korean former football player
- Cho Dong-kee — South Korean retired baseball player
- Cho Chikun — South Korean go player
- Zo In-sung — South Korean actor
- So Yi-hyun (born Jo Woo-jung) — South Korean actress
- Jo Woo-ri — South Korean actress
