= Yi Hwan =

Yi Hwan may refer to:

- Myeongjong of Joseon (1534–1567), king of Joseon
- Heonjong of Joseon (1827–1849), king of Joseon
