= Chung Kyung-ho =

Chung Kyung-ho may refer to:

- Chung Kyung-ho (footballer), born 1980
- Chung Kyung-ho (basketball), born 1987

== See also ==
- Jung Kyung-ho, actor born 1983
- Jung Kyung-ho (disambiguation)
