= Kyung-ho =

- Hangul: 경호
- RR: Gyeongho
- MR: Kyŏngho

Kyung-ho, also spelled Kyong-ho, is a Korean given name.

People with this name include:

== Entertainers ==
- Kim Kyung-ho (born 1971), South Korean rock singer
- Jung Kyung-ho (actor, born 1972), South Korean actor
- Ricky Kim (Kim Kyung-ho, born 1981), American actor
- Jung Kyung-ho (actor, born 1983), South Korean actor
- Smeb (born Song Kyung-ho, 1995), South Korean professional League of Legends player

== Sportspeople ==
- Park Kyung-ho (judoka) (born 1963), South Korean judo practitioner
- Chung Kyung-ho (basketball) (born 1970), South Korean basketball player
- Chung Kyung-ho (born 1980), South Korean football striker
- Kwon Kyung-ho (born 1986), South Korean football midfielder
- Jung Kyung-ho (footballer, born 1987), South Korean football midfielder
- Kang Kyung-ho (born 1987), South Korean mixed martial artist
- Min Kyeong-ho (born 1996), South Korean cyclist
- Kim Kyung-ho (archer), South Korean archer who won the 1997 World Archery Championships

== Other ==
- Yi Hwang (1501–1570), courtesy name Gyeongho, Joseon dynasty Confucian scholar
- An Kyong-ho (born 1930), North Korean politician
- Kim Kyong-ho, North Korean politician chosen to represent Chaedong in the 2014 North Korean parliamentary election

== See also ==
- List of Korean given names
