= Where Stars Land =

2018 South Korean romantic melodrama series

- Promotional poster
- Hangul: 여우각시별
- Lit.: Fox Bride Star
- RR: Yeou gaksi byeol
- MR: Yŏu kaksi pyŏl
- Genre: Romance; Melodrama
- Written by: Kang Eun-kyung
- Directed by: Shin Woo-chul
- Starring: Lee Je-hoon; Chae Soo-bin; Lee Dong-gun; Kim Ji-soo
- Country of origin: South Korea
- Original languages: Korean; English; Filipino
- No. of episodes: 32 (Note: In order to circumvent Korean laws that prevent commercial breaks in the middle of an episode, what would previously have been aired as single 70 minute episodes are now being repackaged as two 35 minute episodes, with two episodes being shown each night with a commercial break between the two.)

Production
- Executive producers: Ahn Je-hyun; Shin Sang-yoon; Sohn Ki-won
- Camera setup: Single-camera
- Running time: 35 minutes
- Production companies: Kim Jong-hak Production; Samhwa Networks

Original release
- Network: SBS TV
- Release: October 1 – November 26, 2018

Where Stars Land (Korean: 여우각시별) is a South Korean television series starring Lee Je-hoon and Chae Soo-bin. It aired on SBS from October 1 to November 26, 2018, on Mondays and Tuesdays at 22:00 (KST) for 32 episodes.

== Synopsis ==
It follows the lives of employees at Incheon International Airport.

== Cast ==
=== Main ===
- Lee Je-hoon as Lee Soo-yeon (29 years old)
  - Nam Da-reum as young Lee Soo-yeon

A first-year member of the Passenger Services team. He graduated from the prestigious KAIST and dreamed of becoming a pilot, but due to an accident he could not fulfill his dream. A mysterious man who harbors a secret that causes him to keep his distance from his coworkers.

- Chae Soo-bin as Han Yeo-reum (27 years old)

A first-year member of the Passenger Services team. She strives to be a perfectionist but makes many mistakes due to clumsiness and a tendency to let her emotions get the better of her.

- Lee Dong-gun as Seo In-woo (37 years old)

Team manager of Airport Planning and Operation. His father and Lee Soo-yeon's mother were remarried, making him the step-brother of Lee Soo-yeon.

- Kim Ji-soo as Yang Seo-koon (41 years old)

Team manager of Passenger Services. She knows everything about Lee Soo-yeon from the beginning. She thinks of Lee Soo-yeon as her brother because Soo-yeon often reminds her of her younger brother Yang Ji-hoon.

=== Supporting ===
Passenger Service Team

- Jang Hyun-sung as Kwon Hee-seung

Director of Terminal 2 (T2) of Incheon International Airport.

- Ahn Sang-woo as Gong Seung-cheol (40 years old)

Manager of Passenger Service Team. He is married and has a teenage daughter.

Security Service Team

- Lee Sung-wook as Choi Moo-ja

Manager of Security Service Team. He is also the husband of Passenger Services team manager Yang Seo-koon.

- Kim Kyung-nam as Oh Dae-ki (31 years old)

Head Officer at Security Service Team. He is kind and soft-hearted though he appears as rough and tough. Dae-ki has a one-sided love for his team junior, Na Young-joo.

- Lee Soo-kyung as Na Young-joo (28 years old)

She is Oh Dae-ki's assistant. Young-joo is a former judo athlete. She is hard-working and ambitious. She and Han Yeo-Reum become roommates.

Mooring Management Team

- Kim Won-hae as Park Tae-hee

Manager of Airport Mooring Management Team.

- Rowoon as Ko Eun-sub (29 years old)

Han Yeo-reum's close friend. He has a one-sided love for Yeo-reum and supports her in every way.

- Ha Ji-eun as Si Jae-in

Staff of Incheon Airport

- Jeong Jae-sung as Lee Woo-taek

Team Manager of Transportation Services.

- Hong Ji-min as Heo Young-ran

Team Manager of Commercial Facilities.

- Kim Joon-won as Mo Jeong-hoon

Team Manager of Incheon International Airport Integrated Operations (IOC).

Others

- Park Hyuk-kwon as Mister Zhang

Owner of Fox Bride Star cafe. He is also a doctor who is trying to cure Lee Soo-yeon.

- Choi Won-young as Han Jae-young

Han Yeo-reum's father. He is the former owner of Fox Bride Star cafe.

- Kim Yeo-jin as Yoon Hye-won

Han Yeo-reum's mother. She used to live in Nigeria.

- Lee Seul-a
- Park Ji-il as homeless man (Seo In-woo's father)

=== Special appearances ===
- Yoon Kyung-ho as unreasonable customer (ep. 1)
- Ejay Falcon as Ian Santos (ep. 7–8)
- Yoon Ji-on as Security check employee
- Lauren Young as Mari (ep. 7–8)
- Im Won-hee as gift shop employee (ep. 17)
- Ahn Chang-hwan as husband of airport employee (ep. 22)

== Production ==
- The series is the second collaboration between screenwriter Kang Eun-kyung and director Shin Woo-cheol after the 2013 series Gu Family Book.
- The early working title of the series is Incheon Airport People (인천공항 사람들; Incheongonghang saramdeul).
- The lead roles were first offered to Hyun Bin and Park Shin-hye, then to Park Bo-gum and Bae Suzy, but they all declined.
- The first script reading took place on July 28, 2018, at SBS Ilsan Production Studios in Goyang, Gyeonggi Province, South Korea.

== Original soundtrack ==
Where Stars Land OST

Soundtrack album by Various artists
- Released: 2018
- Genre: Soundtrack
- Languages: Korean; English
- Labels: SNJ Media, elpark

=== Part 1 ===
Released on October 8, 2018
No.	Title	Lyrics	Music	Artist	Length
1.	"It's You" (너였나 봐)	Nam Hye-seung, Park Jin-ho	Nam Hye-seung, Jeon Jong-hyuk, Heo Seok	Kim Chung-ha	03:25
2.	"It's You" (Inst.)		Nam Hye-seung, Jeon Jong-hyuk, Heo Seok		03:25
Total length:					06:50

=== Part 2 ===
Released on October 16, 2018
No.	Title	Lyrics	Music	Artist	Length
1.	"Told You So" (이봐 이봐 이봐)	Nam Hye-seung	Nam Hye-seung, Park Jin-ho	Jeong Se-woon	03:26
2.	"Told You So" (Inst.)		Nam Hye-seung, Park Jin-ho		03:26
Total length:					06:52

=== Part 3 ===
Released on October 23, 2018
No.	Title	Lyrics	Music	Artist	Length
1.	"Gravity of Love" (닮아가)	Nam Hye-seung, Park Jin-ho, Jung Joon-il	Nam Hye-seung, Park Jin-ho	Jung Joon-il	04:41
2.	"Gravity of Love" (Inst.)		Nam Hye-seung, Park Jin-ho		04:41
Total length:					09:22

=== Part 4 ===
Released on October 30, 2018
No.	Title	Lyrics	Music	Artist	Length
1.	"Nothing to Worry" (괜찮다고)	Nam Hye-seung, Park Jin-ho	Nam Hye-seung, Jeon Jong-hyuk, Heo Seok	1415	05:03
2.	"Nothing to Worry" (Inst.)		Nam Hye-seung, Jeon Jong-hyuk, Heo Seok		05:03
Total length:					10:06

=== Part 5 ===
Released on November 6, 2018
No.	Title	Lyrics	Music	Artist	Length
1.	"Mystic World"	Nam Hye-seung, JELLO ANN, MIYO	Nam Hye-seung, MIYO	O.WHEN	04:31
2.	"Mystic World" (Inst.)		Nam Hye-seung, MIYO		04:31
Total length:					09:02

=== Part 6 ===
Released on November 12, 2018
No.	Title	Lyrics	Music	Artist	Length
1.	"Stay with You" (마음이 하는 일)	Kim Ho-kyung	1601	Yeonjung (Cosmic Girls)	03:57
2.	"Stay with You" (Inst.)		1601		03:57
Total length:					07:54

=== Part 7 ===
Released on November 19, 2018
No.	Title	Lyrics	Music	Artist	Length
1.	"Dream of You" (그런 꿈을 꾼다)	Nam Hye-seung, Park Jin-ho	1601	Kim Yeon-woo	03:51
2.	"Dream of You" (Inst.)		1601		03:51
Total length:					07:42

=== Part 8 ===
Released on November 20, 2018
No.	Title	Lyrics	Music	Artist	Length
1.	"Becoming the Summer" (여름이 되어)	Nam Hye-seung, Park Jin-ho	1601	Fromm	04:01
2.	"Becoming the Summer" (Inst.)		1601		04:01
Total length:					08:02

== Viewership ==
Where Stars Land : South Korea viewers per episode (millions)

Episodes	Episode number															
Episodes	1	2	3	4	5	6	7	8	9	10	11	12	13	14	15	16
1–16	0.998	1.224	0.999	1.461	1.088	1.475	1.242	1.582	1.121	1.288	1.180	1.441	1.048	1.340	1.143	1.434
17–32	1.052	1.383	1.121	1.591	1.164	1.590	1.138	1.431	1.204	1.517	1.175	1.506	1.262	1.615	1.605	1.740

Source: Audience measurement performed nationwide by Nielsen Media Research.

Ep.	Original broadcast date	Average audience share		
Ep.	Original broadcast date	AGB Nielsen		TNmS
Ep.	Original broadcast date	Nationwide	Seoul	Nationwide
1	October 1, 2018	5.9% (18th)	7.0% (15th)	5.6%
2	October 1, 2018	7.2% (12th)	8.4% (7th)	6.6%
3	October 2, 2018	6.3% (13th)	7.4% (8th)	5.5%
4	October 2, 2018	8.6% (6th)	9.6% (4th)	7.7%
5	October 8, 2018	6.7% (15th)	7.5% (11th)	6.3%
6	October 8, 2018	9.1% (7th)	10.2% (4th)	7.7%
7	October 9, 2018	7.2% (13th)	7.5% (12th)	6.5%
8	October 9, 2018	9.0% (5th)	9.6% (4th)	8.2%
9	October 15, 2018	6.9% (13th)	7.7% (8th)	6.6%
10	October 15, 2018	8.0% (8th)	8.7% (6th)	8.0%
11	October 16, 2018	7.4% (9th)	8.0% (8th)	7.1%
12	October 16, 2018	9.2% (7th)	9.9% (5th)	8.7%
13	October 23, 2018 (Note: No episodes were aired on October 22 due to the broadcast of a KBO playoff baseball game between the Hanhwa Eagles and Nexen Heroes.)	6.7% (12th)	7.5% (10th)	6.6%
14	October 23, 2018	8.6% (6th)	9.7% (4th)	8.6%
15	October 29, 2018	6.8% (17th)	6.8% (16th)	6.1%
16	October 29, 2018	8.2% (10th)	8.3% (8th)	7.8%
17	October 30, 2018	6.7% (13th)	7.2% (10th)	6.4%
18	October 30, 2018	8.6% (7th)	9.2% (5th)	8.1%
19	November 5, 2018	7.2% (15th)	7.5% (13th)	6.7%
20	November 5, 2018	9.5% (7th)	10.1% (4th)	8.2%
21	November 6, 2018	7.5% (11th)	8.6% (9th)	6.5%
22	November 6, 2018	9.6% (7th)	10.4% (4th)	8.9%
23	November 12, 2018	7.3% (13th)	8.2% (9th)	6.5%
24	November 12, 2018	8.4% (8th)	9.2% (4th)	7.8%
25	November 13, 2018	7.7% (10th)	7.9% (10th)	7.8%
26	November 13, 2018	9.3% (8th)	9.5% (6th)	9.1%
27	November 19, 2018	7.2% (14th)	7.3% (16th)	7.2%
28	November 19, 2018	8.6% (10th)	9.1% (7th)	8.6%
29	November 20, 2018	8.3% (10th)	9.0% (8th)	8.3%
30	November 20, 2018	9.7% (7th)	10.8% (5th)	9.7%
31	November 26, 2018	9.3% (8th)	10.4% (6th)	9.3%
32	November 26, 2018	9.7% (7th)	10.6% (5th)	9.7%
Average		8.0%	8.7%	7.6%

== Awards and nominations ==
Year	Award	Category	Nominee	Result	Ref.
2018	SBS Drama Awards	Best Drama	Where Stars Land	Won	
2018	SBS Drama Awards	Top Excellence Award, Actor in a Monday-Tuesday Drama	Lee Je-hoon	Won	
2018	SBS Drama Awards	Excellence Award, Actor in a Monday-Tuesday Drama	Lee Dong-gun	Nominated	
2018	SBS Drama Awards	Excellence Award, Actress in a Monday-Tuesday Drama	Chae Soo-bin	Won	
2018	SBS Drama Awards	Excellence Award, Actress in a Monday-Tuesday Drama	Kim Ji-soo	Nominated	
2018	SBS Drama Awards	Best Supporting Actor	Kim Kyung-nam	Nominated	
2018	SBS Drama Awards	Best New Actor	Kim Ro-woon	Nominated	
2018	SBS Drama Awards	Best New Actress	Lee Soo-kyung	Nominated	
2018	SBS Drama Awards	Best Couple Award	Lee Je-hoon and Chae Soo-bin	Nominated	
