= Ahn Hyo-seop =

Canadian actor (born 1995)

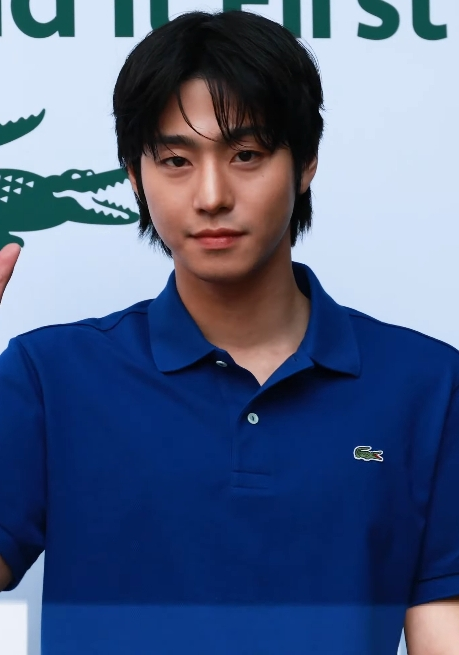
- Ahn in May 2024
- Born: April 17, 1995 (age 31); Seoul, South Korea
- Citizenship: Canada
- Education: Kookmin University – Department of International Business
- Occupations: Actor; singer
- Years active: 2015–present
- Agent: The Present Company
- Musical career
- Genre: K-pop
- Instrument: Vocals
- Years active: 2015–2019
- Label: Starhaus
- Formerly of: One O One

Korean name
- Hangul: 안효섭
- Hanja: 安孝燮
- RR: An Hyoseop
- MR: An Hyosŏp

Signature
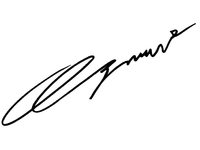

Ahn Hyo-seop (Korean: 안효섭; born April 17, 1995) is a Canadian actor and singer based in South Korea. He debuted as a singer in 2015 with the group One O One, releasing the debut single "Love You". He then gained recognition as an actor for his performances in the second and third seasons of Dr. Romantic (2020–2023), dramas Lovers of the Red Sky (2021) and Business Proposal (2022), as well as voicing the character Jinu in the animated musical film KPop Demon Hunters (2025).

== Early life and education ==
Ahn was born on April 17, 1995, in Seoul, South Korea as the youngest of three siblings. When he was six years old, his family immigrated to Toronto, Ontario, Canada, where he grew up. Ahn later moved back to South Korea when he was 17, while his family stayed in Canada. He later attended and graduated from Kookmin University, in the Department of International Business.

== Career ==
=== Pre-debut activities ===
After moving back to South Korea, Ahn was scouted by JYP Entertainment and became a trainee for three years, and lived in a dorm with members of the K-pop boy band Got7. He eventually left the company due to stress as a trainee.

=== 2015–2016: Beginnings with One O One and acting debut ===
On October 1, 2015, Starhaus Entertainment launched the project group One O One, releasing their debut single "Love You". The group consisted of Ahn together with fellow Starhaus actors Kwak Si-yang, Song Won-seok and Kwon Do-kyun. However, the group presumably disbanded due to inactivity since January 2019. Ahn made his acting debut in the MBC drama, Splash Splash Love. He then became a cast member of the music variety show Always Cantare. He had supporting roles in One More Happy Ending, Happy Home and Entertainer in 2016.

=== 2017–2020: Rising popularity ===
His popularity rose after his first ever lead role in Queen of the Ring in 2017. He then transitioned to lead roles thereafter. In 2018, Ahn starred in Still 17, playing passionate high school student Yoo Chan – the captain of the high school rowing club. For his performance, he won Best New Actor Award and was nominated for the "Character of the Year" Award at the 2018 SBS Drama Awards alongside Jo Hyun-sik and Lee Do-hyun. And later in the same year, Ahn acted in the drama Top Management which aired on YouTube Red. In 2019, Ahn starred alongside Park Bo-young in the romantic comedy fantasy crime drama Abyss, where he played rich yet unattractive heir to a cosmetics empire who transforms into a handsome young man as he is revived by a mysterious orb after his death. In late 2019, Ahn became an MC at the 4th Asia Artist Awards with Leeteuk, Lim Ji-yeon and Nancy.

In 2020, Ahn starred in the second season of the hit medical drama Dr. Romantic, playing general surgeon Seo Woo-jin with Lee Sung-kyung as his leading lady. The show was a success, with both Ahn and Lee keeping their promise of singing for the fans as it crossed the double-digit mark for ratings. His performance in the drama earned him the Best New Actor Award in television at the 56th Baeksang Arts Awards. He also received Excellence Award, Actor in a Miniseries Action/Genre Drama at 2020 SBS Drama Awards.

=== 2021–present: Transition to lead roles ===
In 2021, Ahn starred in the historical-fantasy drama Lovers of the Red Sky adapted from the novel written by Jung Eun-gwol, playing the role of Ha Ram, a blind astrologer who reads the stars, while living a disguised life as Ilwolseong – chief of an information organization and whose body is possessed by Ma Wang (the Demon King) since childhood, alongside Kim You-jung as Hong Cheon-gi, a female painter. For his portrayal of multiple roles as Ha Ram, Ilwolseong and Ma Wang, he received Excellence Award, Actor in a Miniseries Genre/Fantasy Drama and won Best Couple Award with Kim You-jung at 2021 SBS Drama Awards.

In 2022, Ahn starred in the SBS-broadcast and Netflix-distributed romantic comedy drama Business Proposal adapted from the webtoon with the same title, with Kim Se-jeong. He played the role of Kang Tae-mu, a third generation chaebol and CEO. In March 2022, he was cast in the Netflix series A Time Called You, South Korean adaptation of the Taiwanese drama Someday or One Day. In May 2022, Ahn signed with The Present Company, the agency he co-founded with a manager who worked with him before his debut.

In 2023, Ahn reprised his role as Seo Woo-jin in the third season of the hit medical drama Dr. Romantic. In 2024, he was cast in his first film, the live-action fantasy Omniscient Reader: The Prophecy, an adaptation of the web novel Omniscient Reader's Viewpoint by Sing Shong. Directed by Kim Byung-woo, the film features Ahn as Kim Dok-ja, a character who finds himself in a world where a web novel he read has become reality. He partners with the novel's protagonist, Yoo Joong-hyuk (Lee Min-ho), to alter their destiny and avert the world's destruction.

In June 2025, Ahn made his voice acting debut as Jinu, a member of the fictional K-pop boy band Saja Boys, in the Netflix animated musical film KPop Demon Hunters. The film quickly rose to the top of Netflix's global charts for three consecutive days, achieving the No. 1 ranking in 31 countries. This gave Ahn wider international recognition.

== Other ventures ==
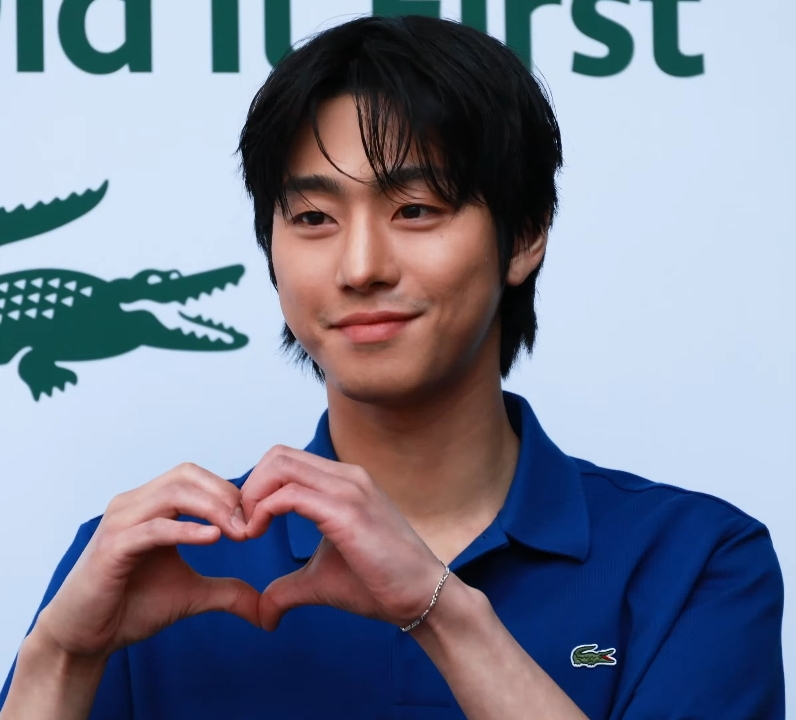
Ahn in May 2024

=== Endorsements ===
Following his successful dramas, Ahn became a model for various brands, including cosmetics, fashion, and food and beverages. In March 2024, he was officially announced as a brand ambassador for Lacoste.

=== Philanthropy ===
In September 2020, he donated 160,000 face masks (worth about ₩100 million) to the National Fire Agency to help fight COVID-19. In August 2022, he donated ₩50 million to the Hope Bridge Korea Disaster Relief Association to help with recovery from heavy rain damage. In October 2023, he volunteered his voice for an audio guide at the special art exhibition for disabled artists, "Your World That I Live In," hosted by the Seoul Arts Center and the Seoul Foundation for Arts and Culture. In May 2024, in celebration of Children's Day, he donated ₩50 million to the Korean Committee for UNICEF to support children around the world. He later joined the "UNICEF Team" campaign as a talent donor, along with Lee Jung, Park Wi, Shim Eu-ddeum, Cha Jun-hwan, and Cha Hyun-seung.

== Filmography ==
=== Film ===
Key
†	Denotes films that have not yet been released

Year	Title	Role	Notes	Ref.
2025	KPop Demon Hunters	Jinu	Voice	
2025	Omniscient Reader: The Prophecy	Kim Dok-ja		

=== Television series ===
Key
†	Denotes television productions that have not yet been released

Year	Title	Role	Notes	Ref.
2015	Splash Splash Love	Park Yeon / Che A-jik		
2016	One More Happy Ending	Ahn Jung-woo		
2016	Happy Home	Choi Chul-soo		
2016	Entertainer	Ji-noo		
2017	Three Color Fantasy – "Queen of the Ring"	Park Se-gun	One-act drama	
2017	My Father Is Strange	Park Cheol-su		
2018	Still 17	Yoo Chan		
2019	Abyss	Cha Min		
2020–2023	Dr. Romantic	Seo Woo-jin	Season 2–3	
2021	Lovers of the Red Sky	Ha Ram		
2022	Business Proposal	Kang Tae-moo		
2023	A Time Called You	Koo Yeon-jun / Nam Si-heon		
2026	Sold Out on You	Matthew Lee / Lee Hae-seok		
2026	Final Table	Kang Han / Chris K.		

=== Web series ===
Year	Title	Role	Ref.
2018	Top Management	Hyun Soo-yong	

=== Television shows ===
Year	Title	Role	Notes	Ref.
2015	Always Cantare – Season 2	Cast member		
2016	Celebrity Bromance – Chuseok Special	Cast member	with Jackson Wang	

=== Music video appearances ===
Year	Song title	Artist(s)	Ref.
2023	"Even for a Moment"	Sung Si-kyung feat. Naul	

=== Hosting ===
Year	Title	Notes	Ref.
2019	4th Asia Artist Awards	with Leeteuk, Lim Ji-yeon and Nancy	
2022	2022 SBS Drama Awards	with Shin Dong-yup and Kim Se-jeong	

== Discography ==
Title	Year	Album	Notes	Ref.
"Get Myself With You"	2018	S.O.U.L	as part of S.O.U.L	
"Gravity"	2018	S.O.U.L	as part of S.O.U.L	
"Sugar Cane"	2018	S.O.U.L	as part of S.O.U.L	
"Me In"	2018	S.O.U.L	as part of S.O.U.L	
"I Will Show You" with Z.Hera	2018	Top Management OST		
"Thank You for the Memories"	2023	Dr. Romantic Season 3 OST Part 10		
"Something Special" (with Khalid and Fandom)	2026	Non-album single		

== Accolades ==
=== Awards and nominations ===
Name of the award ceremony, year presented, category, nominee(s) of the award, and the result of the nomination
Award	Year	Category	Nominee(s)	Result	Ref.
A-Awards	2022	A-Awards – Confidence	Business Proposal	Won	
APAN Star Awards	2021	Best New Actor	Dr. Romantic 2	Nominated	
APAN Star Awards	2022	Excellence Award, Actor in a Miniseries	Lovers of the Red Sky; Business Proposal	Nominated	
APAN Star Awards	2022	Popularity Star Award, Actor	Lovers of the Red Sky	Nominated	
APAN Star Awards	2022	Best Couple Award	Business Proposal (with Kim Se-jeong)	Nominated	
Asia Artist Awards	2017	Rookie Award	My Father is Strange	Won	
Asia Artist Awards	2019	Choice Award	Ahn Hyo-seop	Won	
Asia Artist Awards	2020	Best Actor Award	Dr. Romantic 2	Won	
Asia Artist Awards	2020	Popularity Award (Actor)	Ahn Hyo-seop	Nominated	
Asia Artist Awards	2022	Popularity Award (Actor)	Ahn Hyo-seop	Nominated	
Asia Artist Awards	2023	Best Actor Award	Ahn Hyo-seop	Won	
Asia Artist Awards	2023	Hot Trend Award	Ahn Hyo-seop	Won	
Asia Artist Awards	2026	Popularity Award – Actor	Ahn Hyo-seop	Pending	
Baeksang Arts Awards	2020	Best New Actor – Television	Dr. Romantic 2	Won	
Baeksang Arts Awards	2026	Best New Actor	Omniscient Reader: The Prophecy	Nominated	
Beautiful Art Awards (Shin Young-kyun Arts and Culture Foundation)	2025	New Artist Award	Ahn Hyo-seop	Won	
Blue Dragon Film Awards	2025	Best New Actor	Omniscient Reader: The Prophecy	Nominated	
Korea Drama Awards	2019	Best New Actor	Abyss	Nominated	
Korea First Brand Awards	2024	Male Actor (Vietnam Category)	Ahn Hyo-seop	Won	
Korea First Brand Awards	2026	Male Actor (Indonesia Category)	Ahn Hyo-seop	Won	
MBC Drama Awards	2016	Best New Actor	Happy Home	Nominated	
Nickelodeon Kids' Choice Awards	2026	Favorite Male Animated Voice from a Movie	KPop Demon Hunters	Won	
SBS Drama Awards	2018	Best New Actor	Still 17	Won	
SBS Drama Awards	2018	Character of the Year	Still 17	Nominated	
SBS Drama Awards	2020	Excellence Award, Actor in a Miniseries Action/Genre Drama	Dr. Romantic 2	Won	
SBS Drama Awards	2020	Best Couple Award	Dr. Romantic 2 (with Lee Sung-kyung)	Nominated	
SBS Drama Awards	2021	Excellence Award, Actor in a Miniseries Genre/Fantasy Drama	Lovers of the Red Sky	Won	
SBS Drama Awards	2021	Best Couple Award	Lovers of the Red Sky (with Kim You-jung)	Won	
SBS Drama Awards	2022	Best Couple Award	Business Proposal (with Kim Se-jeong)	Won	
SBS Drama Awards	2022	Top Excellence Award, Actor in a Miniseries Romance/Comedy Drama	Business Proposal	Won	
SBS Drama Awards	2023	Top Excellence Award, Actor in a Seasonal Drama	Dr. Romantic 3	Won	
SBS Drama Awards	2023	Best Supporting Team	Dr. Romantic 3	Won	
SBS Drama Awards	2023	Best Couple Award	Dr. Romantic 3 (with Lee Sung-kyung)	Nominated	

=== Listicles ===
Name of publisher, year listed, name of listicle, and placement
Publisher	Year	Listicle	Placement	Ref.
Forbes	2022	Korea Power Celebrity 40	37th	
Forbes	2023	Korea Power Celebrity 40	33rd	
Forbes	2024	30 Under 30 – Entertainment (Korea)	Top 5	
