= Jung Kyung-ho (disambiguation) =

Jung Kyung-ho is a South Korean actor (born 1983).

Jung Kyung-ho may also refer to:

- Jung Kyung-ho (actor, born 1972)
- Jung Kyung-ho (footballer, born 1987)

== See also ==
- Chung Kyung-ho
