= The Fabulous =

2022 South Korean television series

- Promotional poster
- Hangul: 더 패뷸러스
- RR: Deo paebyulleoseu
- MR: Tŏ p'aebyullŏsŭ
- Genre: Romantic comedy
- Created by: Netflix
- Written by: Kim Ji-hee; Im Jin-seon
- Directed by: Kim Jung-hyun
- Starring: Chae Soo-bin; Choi Min-ho; Lee Sang-woon; Park Hee-jung
- Music by: Lim Ha-yeong
- Country of origin: South Korea
- Original language: Korean
- No. of seasons: 1
- No. of episodes: 8

Production
- Executive producer: Cha Seon-hwa
- Producers: Park Min-yeop; Lee Min-hoe; Jeong Yoo-an
- Running time: 45-60 minutes
- Production company: Gill Pictures

Original release
- Network: Netflix
- Release: December 23, 2022

The Fabulous (Korean: 더 패뷸러스) is a 2022 South Korean television series, starring Chae Soo-bin, Choi Min-ho, Lee Sang-woon, and Park Hee-jung. It was released on Netflix on December 23, 2022.

== Synopsis ==
Set in Seoul's fashion industry, The Fabulous depicts the stories of young adults who navigate their work, personal lives and relationships while struggling in a dynamic and competitive environment.

== Cast ==
=== Main ===
- Chae Soo-bin as Pyo Ji-eun

A public relations manager of a luxury brand.

- Choi Min-ho as Ji Woo-min

A freelance retoucher. He still has feelings for Ji-eun even though they broke up three years ago.

- Lee Sang-woon as Joseph

A fashion designer with delicate artistic sensibility and pleasant charm.

- Park Hee-jung as Ye Seon-ho

A top supermodel who loves herself.

=== Supporting ===
- Kim Min-kyu as Shim Do-young

A college student who dreams of being a model.

- Choi Hee-jin as Ahn Nam-hee

A fashion magazine editor.

- Shin Dong-mi as Oh

A representative of the luxury brand PR agency.

- Lee Mi-do as Hong Ji-seon

A fashion stylist.

- Jeon Soo-kyeong as Jang Ok-jin

Joseph's mother and a famous actress.

- Choi Won-myeong as Lee Nam-jin

Ji-eun's boyfriend before he breaks up with her in the first episode, an M&A expert.

- Lim Ki-hong as Thierry Henri

The chief designer of the luxury brand Erlane.

- Lee Si-woo as Esther

Joseph's smart assistant.

- Byun Jun-seo as Cho Gang-woo

A former fashion model and an assistant director for the commercial shooting team.

- Kang Na-ru as Jung Hye-na

A former supermodel.

- Jeon Shin-hwan as Chief Do

A famous photographer who runs a photo studio, and Woo-min's senior.

- Seo Soo-hee as JD

A super idol star who has a huge influence on the fashion world, causing the phenomenon to be sold out in stores around the world

=== Others ===
- Moon Ye-won as Seo-jin
- Ye Soo-jung as Pyo Ji-eun's grandmother

== Episodes ==
Season	Episodes	Originally released
1	8	December 23, 2022

=== Season 1 (2023) ===
No. overall	No. in season	Title	Directed by	Written by	Original release date
1	1	"Dom Pérignon and a Shot of Soju"	Kim Jung-hyun	Jin-sun Im & Kim Ji-Hee & Jeong-hyeon Kim	December 23, 2022
Pyo Ji-eun faces her old flame Ji Woo-min at a fashion show. Later, Ji-eun is sent on a mission and Ye Seon-ho confronts her aloof boyfriend.
2	2	"Grandmother's Scarf and the Cheongdam Fashion Circle"	Kim Jung-hyun	Jin-sun Im & Kim Ji-Hee & Jeong-hyeon Kim	December 23, 2022
A celebrity photoshoot with singer JD forces Ji-eun to work with a demanding Hong Ji-seon. When Ji-eun's grandmother causes alarm, Woo-min steps in.
3	3	"The VIP and The Regular"	Kim Jung-hyun	Jin-sun Im & Kim Ji-Hee & Jeong-hyeon Kim	December 23, 2022
An unexpected customer visits Joseph Jean Se-pyeong. While trying to keep Audrey afloat, Ji-eun lands a crucial presentation with an ex's company.
4	4	"The Pop-up Shop and the Tailor Shop"	Kim Jung-hyun	Jin-sun Im & Kim Ji-Hee & Jeong-hyeon Kim	December 23, 2022
When a famed eccentric designer lands in Korea for a secret visit, Ji-eun is asked to accompany him. Woo-min's feelings for Ji-eun grow stronger.
5	5	"Followers and Following"	Kim Jung-hyun	Jin-sun Im & Kim Ji-Hee & Jeong-hyeon Kim	December 23, 2022
Tensions swirl between Ji-eun and Woo-min at a party. Ji-seon endures JD's difficult behavior, while Ji-eun tries to keep up with client demands.
6	6	"The Photo Wall and the Exhibition"	Kim Jung-hyun	Jin-sun Im & Kim Ji-Hee & Jeong-hyeon Kim	December 23, 2022
Seon-ho considers a career beyond modeling. Ji-eun's agency organizes celebrity photos for an exhibit, while Woo-min is inspired by an old hangout.
7	7	"Vintage and Sustainability"	Kim Jung-hyun	Jin-sun Im & Kim Ji-Hee & Jeong-hyeon Kim	December 23, 2022
Joseph gets a major job opportunity. Woo-min and Ji-eun reminisce on a camping trip, and chaos ensues when a one-of-a-kind bag goes missing from a shoot.
8	8	"Fashion and Passion"	Kim Jung-hyun	Jin-sun Im & Kim Ji-Hee & Jeong-hyeon Kim	December 23, 2022
Anxieties run high as the glamorous launch of Earlain J approaches. Joseph struggles to finish his collection and Woo-min makes a bold decision.

== Release ==
On October 31, 2022, Netflix announced that the series, which was originally scheduled for release on November 4, was postponed due to the Seoul Halloween crowd crush tragedy. In late November 2022, it was announced that the series will be released on December 23.
