= Chae Soo-bin =

South Korean actress (born 1994)

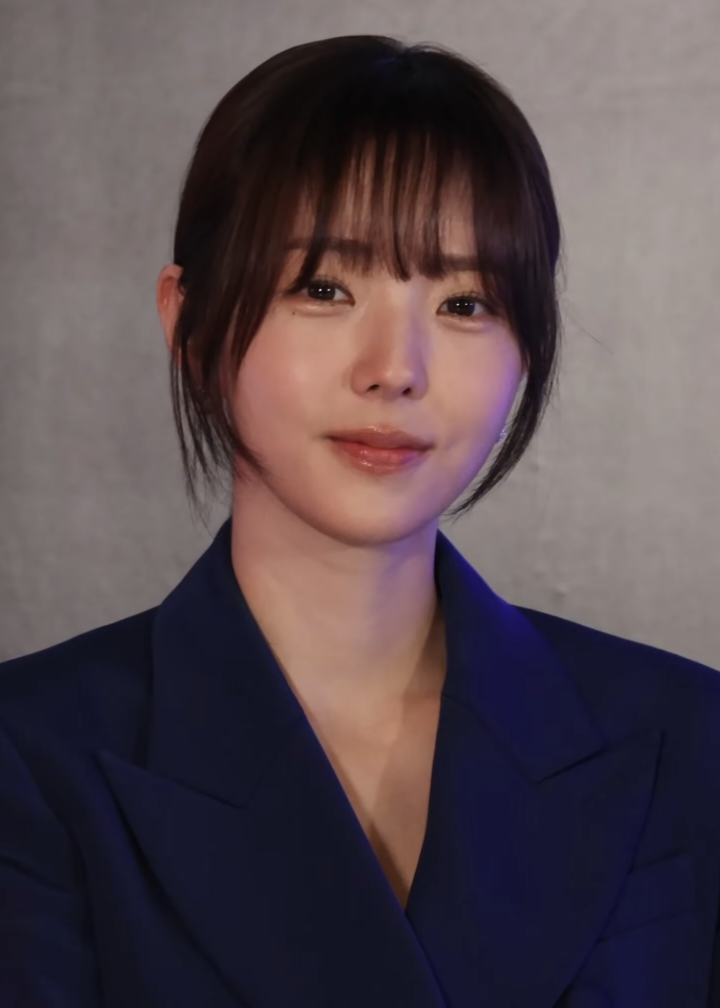
- Chae in March 2026
- Born: Bae Soo-bin; July 10, 1994 (age 32); Anyang, Gyeonggi, South Korea
- Education: Konkuk University
- Occupation: Actress
- Years active: 2014–present
- Agent: King Kong by Starship

Korean name
- Hangul: 배수빈
- Hanja: 裵秀彬
- RR: Bae Subin
- MR: Pae Subin

Stage name
- Hangul: 채수빈
- Hanja: 蔡秀彬
- RR: Chae Subin
- MR: Ch'ae Subin

Bae Soo-bin (Korean: 배수빈; born July 10, 1994), known professionally as Chae Soo-bin (채수빈), is a South Korean actress. Chae made her acting debut in the film My Dictator (2014) and later gained attention for her role in the television series Love in the Moonlight (2016). She then transitioned to leading roles with dramas The Rebel (2017) and I'm Not a Robot (2017–2018), before gaining further recognition for her roles in When the Phone Rings (2024) and Take Charge of My Heart (2026).

== Career ==
=== 2014–2015: Beginnings ===
Chae was spotted by a casting director on the streets, and upon signing a management contract with Toin Entertainment, she proceeded to make her debut in 2014 with the film My Dictator. She then featured in weekend drama House of Bluebird (2015) and youth series Cheer Up! (2015) which won her Best New Actress awards at both 4th APAN Star Awards and 29th KBS Drama Awards.

=== 2016–2019: Rising popularity and breakthrough ===
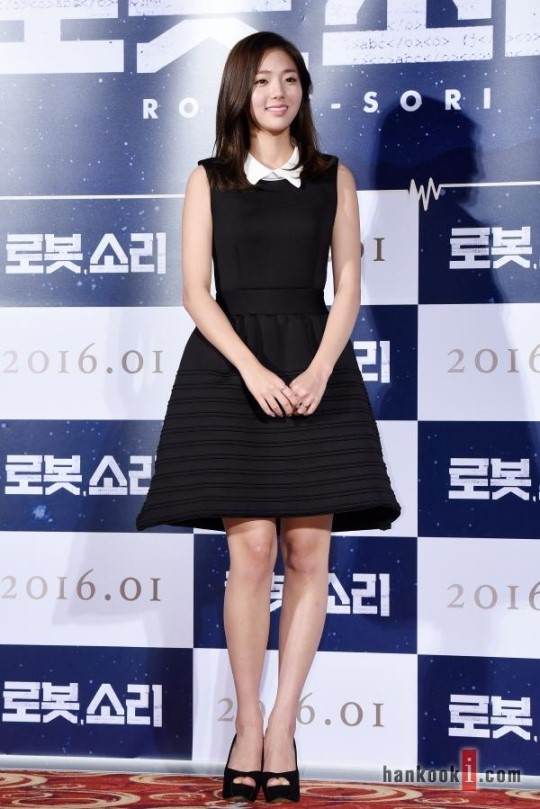
Chae in 2016

Chae became recognized for her performance in the popular sageuk drama Love in the Moonlight (2016) starring Park Bo-gum and directed by Kim Seong-yoon, from which she gained an Excellence Award nomination at the 30th KBS Drama Awards. The same year she starred in the play Blackbird and the Chinese-South Korean web-drama My Catman.

In January 2017, she took on her first prime-time leading role in the historical television series The Rebel. The series was a modest success and led to a rise in popularity for Chae. She then starred in KBS2's youth romance drama Strongest Deliveryman, and MBC's romantic comedy drama I'm Not a Robot. Also in 2017, Chae starred in the first episode of the eighth season of the KBS2 anthology series KBS Drama Special, "If We Were a Season."

In 2018, Chae starred in the airport-themed drama Where Stars Land. Her performance won her the Excellence Award at the SBS Drama Awards. Chae and co-star Lee Je-hoon were also appointed honorary ambassadors of Incheon International Airport. After the expiration of her management contract with Toin Entertainment in December 2018, Chae joined King Kong by Starship in January 2019.

=== 2020–present: Leading roles in film, television, and theater ===
In 2020, Chae starred in the romance drama A Piece of Your Mind alongside Jung Hae-in. In 2021 and 2022, Chae appeared opposite Gong Myung in the music video series for Kyuhyun's Four Seasons Project, which consisted of the singles "Moving On," "Coffee," "Together," and "Love Story." Also in 2021, she starred with Jang Ki-yong in the romantic comedy film Sweet & Sour.

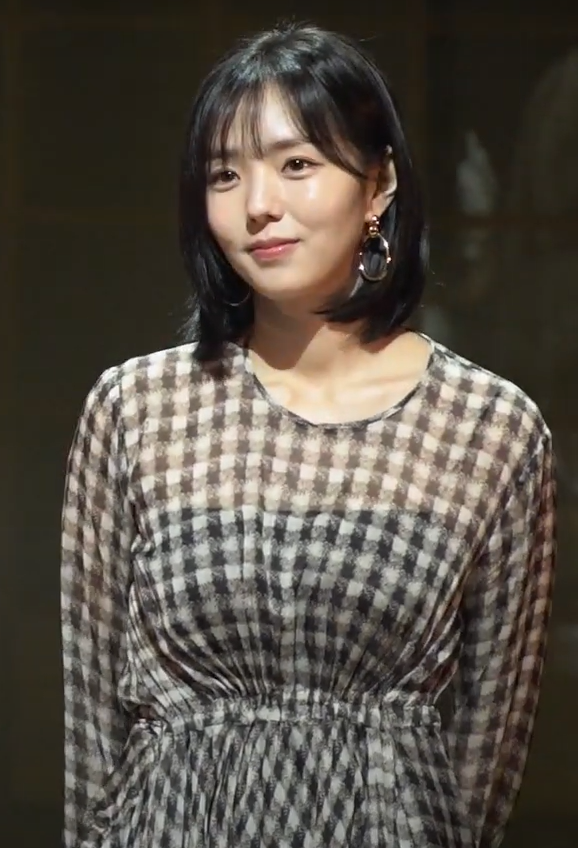
Chae in February 2023

In January 2022, she starred alongside Kang Daniel in the Disney+ series Rookie Cops. That same month, Chae starred in the South Korean period adventure film The Pirates: The Last Royal Treasure. On May 25, 2022, Chae decided to extend her contract with King Kong by Starship. In September, Chae was reunited with her Love in the Moonlight costars for the TVING entertainment program Young Actors' Retreat. In December of that same year she starred in the Netflix series The Fabulous.

In January 2023, Chae was cast as Viola de Lesseps in the 30th anniversary edition of Seoul Arts Center's production of Shakespeare in Love, alongside Jung So-min and Kim You-jung as alternates. On May 24, Chae and singer Jo Yu-ri released the promotional single "Yellow Circle" in collaboration with Lipton and Starship Entertainment.

In 2024, Chae starred in Hijack 1971, a film based on the hijack attempt of a Korean Air F27 airliner in 1971. It was released theatrically on June 21, 2024. That same year, she played Hong Hee-joo, a sign language interpreter who lives with selective mutism following a childhood accident in the romantic thriller When the Phone Rings. To bring the character to life, she took sign language lessons to prepare for the role. For her performance, she won the Excellence Award for Actress in a Miniseries at the 2024 MBC Drama Awards.

In 2025, she starred in the live-action fantasy film Omniscient Reader: The Prophecy, an adaptation of the web novel Omniscient Reader's Viewpoint by Sing Shong.

In October 2026, she starred as Na Bo-bae, a screenwriter whose electric touch changes the life of a man with an artificial heart in the Netflix romcom Take Charge of My Heart.

== Personal life ==
Chae is a Catholic; her baptismal name is "Lucia" (루시아).

== Filmography ==
=== Film ===
Year	Title	Role	Notes	Ref.
2014	My Dictator	Crop Top Girl		
2015	Night With a Perfect Stranger	Hye-jin	Seoul International Love Film Fest: Entry 4	
2015	M.Boy	Lee Eun-soo		
2016	Sori: Voice From The Heart	Kim Yoo-joo		
2019	Rosebud	Hyun-ah		
2021	Sweet & Sour	Da-eun		
2022	The Pirates: The Last Royal Treasure	Hae-geum		
2024	Hijack 1971	Ok Soon		
2025	Omniscient Reader: The Prophecy	Yoo Sang-ah		

=== Television series ===
Year	Title	Role	Notes	Ref.
2014	Drama Special – "The Diary of a Resentful Woman"	Shim Cheong-yi	One-act drama	
2015	Spy	Jo Soo-yeon		
2015	House of Bluebird	Han Eun-soo		
2015	Cheer Up!	Kwon Soo-ah		
2016	Love in the Moonlight	Jo Ha-yeon		
2016	Shopping King Louie	Wang Mong-shil	Cameo (Episode 16)	
2017	The Rebel	Song Ga-ryung		
2017	Strongest Deliveryman	Lee Dan-ah		
2017	Drama Special – "If We Were a Season"	Hae Rim	One-act drama	
2017–2018	I'm Not a Robot	Jo Ji-ah / Aji3		
2018	Where Stars Land	Han Yeo-reum		
2020	A Piece of Your Mind	Han Seo-woo		
2022	Rookie Cops	Go Eun-gang		
2022	The Fabulous	Pyo Ji-eun		
2024–2025	When the Phone Rings	Hong Hee-joo / Na Hee-joo		
2026	Take Charge of My Heart	Na Bo-bae		

=== Web series ===
Year	Title	Role	Ref.
2016	My Catman	Mi-oh	

=== Television shows ===
Year	Title	Role	Notes	Ref.
2021	House on Wheels: For Rent	Cast Member	Spin-off of House on Wheels; with The Pirates 2 cast	

=== Web shows ===
Year	Title	Role	Notes	Ref.
2022	Young Actors' Retreat	Cast member		
2022	Saturday Night Live Korea	Host	Season 3 Episode 3	

=== Music video appearances ===
Year	Title	Artist	Ref.
2014	"Girlfriend"	Uniqnote feat. Bobby Kim and Jung Yup	
2016	"You Are, You Are, You Are"	Wax	
2021	"Moving On"	Kyuhyun	
2021	"Coffee"	Kyuhyun	
2021	"Together"	Kyuhyun	
2022	"Love Story"	Kyuhyun	

== Theatre ==
Year	Title		Role	Venue	Date	Ref.
Year	English	Korean	Role	Venue	Date	Ref.
2012–2013	Thursday Romance	그와 그녀의 목요일	Seo Yi-kyung			
2016	Blackbird	블랙버드)	Una			
2019	The Student and Monsieur Henri	앙리할아버지와 나	Constance Piponnier	Daehangno Uniplex 1	March 15 to May 12	
2020	The Student and Monsieur Henri	앙리할아버지와 나	Constance Piponnier	Hanam Culture and Arts Centre Small Theatre (Arang Hall)	November 6 to 7	
2020	The Student and Monsieur Henri	앙리할아버지와 나	Constance Piponnier	Sejong Gugak Centre	November 13 to 14	
2020–2021	The Student and Monsieur Henri	앙리할아버지와 나	Constance Piponnier	Yes24 Stage 1	December 3 to February 14	
2021	The Student and Monsieur Henri	앙리할아버지와 나	Constance Piponnier	Gyeonggi Art Centre Small Theatre, Suwon	March 27 to 28	
2021	The Student and Monsieur Henri	앙리할아버지와 나	Constance Piponnier	Guri Art Hall Cosmos Grand Theatre, Guri	April 17	
2021	The Student and Monsieur Henri	앙리할아버지와 나	Constance Piponnier	Gimhae Cultural Centre Hani Hall, Gimhae	May 1	
2021	The Student and Monsieur Henri	앙리할아버지와 나	Constance Piponnier	Online	May 31	
2023	Shakespeare in Love	셰익스피어 인 러브 - 서울	Viola de Lesseps	Seoul Arts Center CJ Towol Theater	January 28 to March 26	
2023	Shakespeare in Love	셰익스피어 인 러브 - 서울	Viola de Lesseps	Sejong Arts Centre	April 8 to 9	

== Discography ==
=== Singles ===
List of singles, showing year released, and name of the album
Title	Year	Album
"Yellow Circle" (with Jo Yu-ri)	2023	Non-album single

=== Soundtrack appearances ===
List of soundtrack appearances, showing year released, and name of the album
Title	Year	Album
"That's Love"	2017	The Rebel OST
"Way to You"	2017	Strongest Deliveryman OST

== Awards and nominations ==
Name of the award ceremony, year presented, category, nominee of the award, and the result of the nomination
Award ceremony	Year	Category	Nominee / Work	Result	Ref.
APAN Star Awards	2015	Best New Actress	House of Bluebird	Won	
KBS Drama Awards	2015	Best New Actress	House of Bluebird	Won	
KBS Drama Awards	2015	Best New Actress	Cheer Up!	Won	
KBS Drama Awards	2015	Best Couple Award	Chae Soo-bin (with Lee Sang-yeob); House of Bluebird	Nominated	
KBS Drama Awards	2015	Netizen Award, Actress	House of Bluebird	Nominated	
KBS Drama Awards	2015	Netizen Award, Actress	Cheer Up!	Nominated	
KBS Drama Awards	2016	Excellence Award, Actress in a Mid-length Drama	Love in the Moonlight	Nominated	
KBS Drama Awards	2017	Best Actress in a One-Act/Special/Short Drama	If We Were a Season	Nominated	
KBS Drama Awards	2017	Best Couple Award	Chae Soo-bin (with Go Kyung-pyo); Strongest Deliveryman	Nominated	
KBS Drama Awards	2017	Excellence Award, Actress in a Miniseries	Strongest Deliveryman	Nominated	
KBS Drama Awards	2017	Netizen Award, Actress	Strongest Deliveryman	Nominated	
Max Movie Awards	2016	Rising Star Award	Sori: Voice From The Heart	Won	
MBC Drama Awards	2017	Excellence Award, Actress in a Monday-Tuesday Drama	The Rebel	Won	
MBC Drama Awards	2017	Popularity Award, Actress	I'm Not a Robot	Nominated	
MBC Drama Awards	2024	Best Couple Award	Chae Soo-bin (with Yoo Yeon-seok); When the Phone Rings	Won	
MBC Drama Awards	2024	Excellence Award, Actress in a Miniseries	When the Phone Rings	Won	
SBS Drama Awards	2018	Excellence Award, Actress in a Monday-Tuesday Drama	Where Stars Land	Won	
SBS Drama Awards	2018	Best Couple Award	Chae Soo-bin with Lee Je-hoon; Where Stars Land	Nominated	
