= Take Charge of My Heart =

2026 South Korean television series

- Promotional poster
- Hangul: 나를 충전해줘
- Lit.: Recharge Me
- RR: Nareul chungjeonhae jwo
- MR: Narŭl ch'ungjŏnhae chwŏ
- Genre: Fantasy; Romantic comedy
- Based on: Charge Me by Hae Beon
- Written by: Song Yu-chae
- Directed by: Park Soo-won
- Starring: Kim Young-kwang; Chae Soo-bin
- Country of origin: South Korea
- Original language: Korean
- No. of episodes: 10

Production
- Running time: 59–67 minutes
- Production companies: NEW Point (Note: Founded in July 2025 by Next Entertainment World (NEW) as its second production subsidiary.); WhyNot Media

Original release
- Network: Netflix
- Release: October 9, 2026

Take Charge of My Heart (Korean: 나를 충전해줘) is a 2026 South Korean fantasy romantic comedy television series written by Song Yu-chae, directed by Park Soo-won, and starring Kim Young-kwang and Chae Soo-bin. Based on the Naver webtoon of the same name by Hae Beon, it was released on Netflix on October 9, 2026.

== Cast ==
- Kim Young-kwang as Baek Ho-rang
- Chae Soo-bin as Na Bo-bae
- Cha Woo-min as Ji Eun-ho
- Jung Jae-kwang as Choi Do-yoon
- Shin Do-hyun as Han Seol-hee
- Kim Mi-kyung as Kong Man-seol (TS Group Chairwoman)
- Heo Dong-won as Yoon Jae-ho
- Kim Ah-young as Cho Seo-jeong

== Production ==
=== Development ===
The series was officially commissioned by Netflix in July 2025, with Park Soo-won serving as director, and the script is penned by Song Yu-chae, while NEW Point and WhyNot Media co-managed the production.

=== Casting ===
Kim Young-kwang and Chae Soo-bin were cast as the leads in July 2025. Later on, Cha Woo-min and Kim Ah-young joined the cast. In November, Jung Jae-kwang and Shin Do-hyun were added to the cast.

=== Filming ===
Pre-production began in July 2025. The script reading was held on July 29, 2025. Principal photography of the series began in the second half of 2025 and concluded in 2026. During filming, Chae Soo-bin appeared on the Yoo Yeon-seok's variety show Weekend Drama.

== Release ==
In January 2026, Netflix revealed its slate lineup for 2026. The series' first teaser was unveiled on September 10, 2026, and confirmed for an October release.

The series premiered on Netflix on October 9, 2026.
