= House of Bluebird =

- Genre: Domestic; Romance; Comedy; Drama
- Written by: Choi Hyun-kyung; Park Pil-joo
- Directed by: Ji Byung-hyun
- Starring: Lee Joon-hyuk; Chae Soo-bin; Lee Sang-yeob; Kyung Soo-jin
- Composer: Lee Ji-yong
- Country of origin: South Korea
- Original language: Korean
- No. of episodes: 50

Production
- Executive producers: Kim Sung-geun; Kim Jae-il; Park Ho-kyung
- Producer: Im Se-joon
- Production locations: Seoul, South Korea
- Cinematography: Kang Jang-soo
- Editor: Kim Hyang-sook
- Running time: 60 minutes
- Production company: Hidden Picture Media

Original release
- Network: Korean Broadcasting System
- Release: February 21 – August 9, 2015

House of Bluebird (Korean: 파랑새의 집; RR: Parangsaeui jip; lit. Bluebird's House) is a 2015 South Korean television series starring Lee Joon-hyuk, Chae Soo-bin, Lee Sang-yeob and Kyung Soo-jin. It aired on KBS2 from February 25 to August 9, 2015, on Saturdays and Sundays at 19:55 (KST) for 50 episodes.

== Themes ==
House of Bluebird addresses the differing inter-generational attitudes of Koreans towards work; and the conflict between the desire to fulfill personal dreams and the need to make a living.

== Synopsis ==
The scion of a formerly wealthy traditional land-owning family, Kim Ji-wan grew up an orphan raised by his stepmother and grandmother when his father died, and his family lost its fortune. To provide for his family, Ji-wan swallows his pride and uses nepotism to join Nuga Global, a multi-national medical appliances company. Ji-wan is initially grateful when Jang Tae-soo, Nuga's CEO and a friend of his late father, takes him under his wing. As the lives of Ji-wan's family and that of Tae-soo cross again, long hidden secrets, such as how Ji-wan's father died and came to lose his fortune, begin to unravel. Desperate to protect the business and reputation he has built, Tae-soo uses a secret that Ji-wan's stepmother has kept from Ji-wan and his grandmother.

== Cast ==
=== Main characters ===
- Lee Joon-hyuk as Kim Ji-wan

29, new employee at Nuga Global.

- Chae Soo-bin as Han Eun-soo

24, Ji-wan's non-biological sister. She used to work as a part-time employee in a pizza restaurant before she was employed at Nuga Global as a product designer.

- Lee Sang-yeob as Jang Hyun-do

28, son of Nuga Global's chairman, and friend of Ji-wan. He aspires to be a musician.

- Kyung Soo-jin as Kang Young-joo

25, Eun-soo's friend who has a crush on Ji-wan. She was a teacher before she started scriptwriting.

=== Supporting characters ===
- Choi Myung-gil as Han Sun-hee

55, Eun-soo's adopted mother, Ji-wan's stepmother.

- Jung Jae-soon as Lee Jin-yi

Early 70s, Eun-soo and Ji-wan's paternal grandmother.

- Chun Ho-jin as Jang Tae-soo

55, Nuga Global's chairman, Hyun-do's father, friend of Ji-wan's late father.

- Lee Hye-sook as Jung Soo-kyung

52, Hyun-do's mother, friend of Ji-wan's late father, Sun-hee's rival.

- Song Ok-sook as Oh Min-ja

55, Yeong-joo's mother, Sun-hee's friend.

- Jung Won-joong as Kang Jae-chul

53, Yeong-joo's father, banker.

- Uhm Hyun-kyung as Seo Mi-jin

29, advertising manager at Nuga, Ji-wan and Hyun-do's superior, likes Ji-wan.

- Nam Kyung-eup as Shin Yeong-hwan

50, President & CEO of Hwain Industry.

- Bang Eun-hee as Park Haeng-sook

Ji-wan and Eun-soo's aunt.

- Jung Jae-soon as Lee Jin-yi
- Lee Jung-hyuk as Yoo-min
- Kim Ji-eun as Tae-soo's secretary
- Yang Dae-hyuk as Waiter
- Yoo Jae-myung as Department head Im.

== Ratings ==
Originally the drama aired with English subtitles on KBS World two weeks after its initial broadcast in Korea, this was later reduced to one week.

Episode	Broadcast date	TNmS ratings		AGB Nielsen ratings	
Episode	Broadcast date	Nationwide	Seoul Capital Area	Nationwide	Seoul Capital Area
1	February 21, 2015	23.3%	23.9%	24.4%	23.8%
2	February 22, 2015	26.6%	27.6%	26.3%	26.6%
3	February 28, 2015	23.9%	24.4%	23.1%	23.1%
4	March 1, 2015	24.7%	25.8%	26.0%	26.3%
5	March 7, 2015	22.8%	24.0%	23.3%	23.6%
6	March 8, 2015	25.5%	27.0%	26.2%	26.5%
7	March 14, 2015	22.6%	23.5%	21.5%	21.6%
8	March 15, 2015	26.0%	27.0%	25.7%	26.2%
9	March 21, 2015	22.5%	23.8%	22.3%	22.8%
10	March 22, 2015	25.5%	27.5%	25.4%	25.7%
11	March 28, 2015	23.8%	23.4%	23.0%	23.6%
12	March 29, 2015	26.1%	26.8%	26.6%	27.7%
13	April 4, 2015	23.8%	23.4%	23.5%	23.6%
14	April 5, 2015	26.1%	26.2%	25.2%	25.4%
15	April 11, 2015	22.7%	22.3%	20.6%	20.8%
16	April 12, 2015	27.0%	27.2%	25.4%	25.9%
17	April 18, 2015	22.7%	21.6%	23.0%	23.9%
18	April 19, 2015	27.2%	27.7%	27.0%	28.3%
19	April 25, 2015	21.3%	20.5%	19.7%	19.8%
20	April 26, 2015	26.4%	26.8%	23.9%	24.0%
21	May 2, 2015	23.3%	23.9%	20.1%	21.0%
22	May 3, 2015	26.6%	26.4%	24.3%	23.8%
23	May 9, 2015	22.1%	21.9%	20.1%	20.6%
24	May 10, 2015	25.7%	24.9%	25.5%	26.4%
25	May 16, 2015	22.4%	23.4%	19.9%	20.0%
26	May 17, 2015	23.6%	23.5%	23.5%	23.8%
27	May 23, 2015	22.8%	22.8%	20.3%	20.7%
28	May 24, 2015	24.5%	24.4%	22.8%	23.7%
29	May 30, 2015	22.8%	22.1%	21.3%	21.3%
30	May 31, 2015	25.4%	26.2%	24.2%	25.4%
31	June 6, 2015	21.6%	21.4%	21.3%	21.6%
32	June 7, 2015	24.2%	24.4%	23.1%	23.8%
33	June 13, 2015	23.6%	24.0%	21.7%	22.4%
34	June 14, 2015	25.1%	24.7%	25.4%	25.4%
35	June 20, 2015	24.5%	23.4%	23.6%	24.0%
36	June 21, 2015	25.6%	24.7%	23.7%	24.1%
37	June 27, 2015	22.2%	21.1%	21.6%	21.6%
38	June 28, 2015	26.8%	26.9%	26.3%	26.9%
39	July 4, 2015	22.6%	23.1%	21.4%	21.5%
40	July 5, 2015	27.2%	26.7%	25.4%	25.1%
41	July 11, 2015	23.5%	22.4%	22.7%	22.9%
42	July 12, 2015	28.7%	27.0%	27.4%	28.1%
43	July 18, 2015	22.3%	22.8%	22.4%	22.2%
44	July 19, 2015	25.2%	24.8%	26.4%	27.0%
45	July 25, 2015	23.3%	23.8%	22.6%	22.7%
46	July 26, 2015	25.5%	26.4%	27.3%	26.5%
47	August 1, 2015	21.6%	22.6%	21.7%	21.3%
48	August 2, 2015	24.1%	23.3%	25.8%	26.3%
49	August 8, 2015	21.3%	21.3%	22.4%	22.4%
50	August 9, 2015	24.6%	23.5%	27.5%	27.0%
Average ratings		24.26%	24.36%	23.68%	23.97%

Key

- Blue-lowest rating episode
- Red-highest rating episode

== Awards and nominations ==
Year	Award	Category	Recipient	Result
2015	8th Korea Drama Awards	Best New Actress	Chae Soo-bin	Nominated
2015	4th APAN Star Awards	Best New Actress	Chae Soo-bin	Won
2015	29th KBS Drama Awards	Excellence Award, Actor in a Serial Drama	Lee Joon-hyuk	Nominated
2015	29th KBS Drama Awards	Excellence Award, Actress in a Serial Drama	Kyung Soo-jin	Nominated
2015	29th KBS Drama Awards	Excellence Award, Actress in a Serial Drama	Choi Myung-gil	Nominated
2015	29th KBS Drama Awards	Best Supporting Actress	Uhm Hyun-kyung	Won
2015	29th KBS Drama Awards	Best New Actress	Chae Soo-bin	Won
