= Heonjong of Joseon =

King of Joseon from 1834 to 1849

Heonjong
- Emperor of Korea (posthumously)
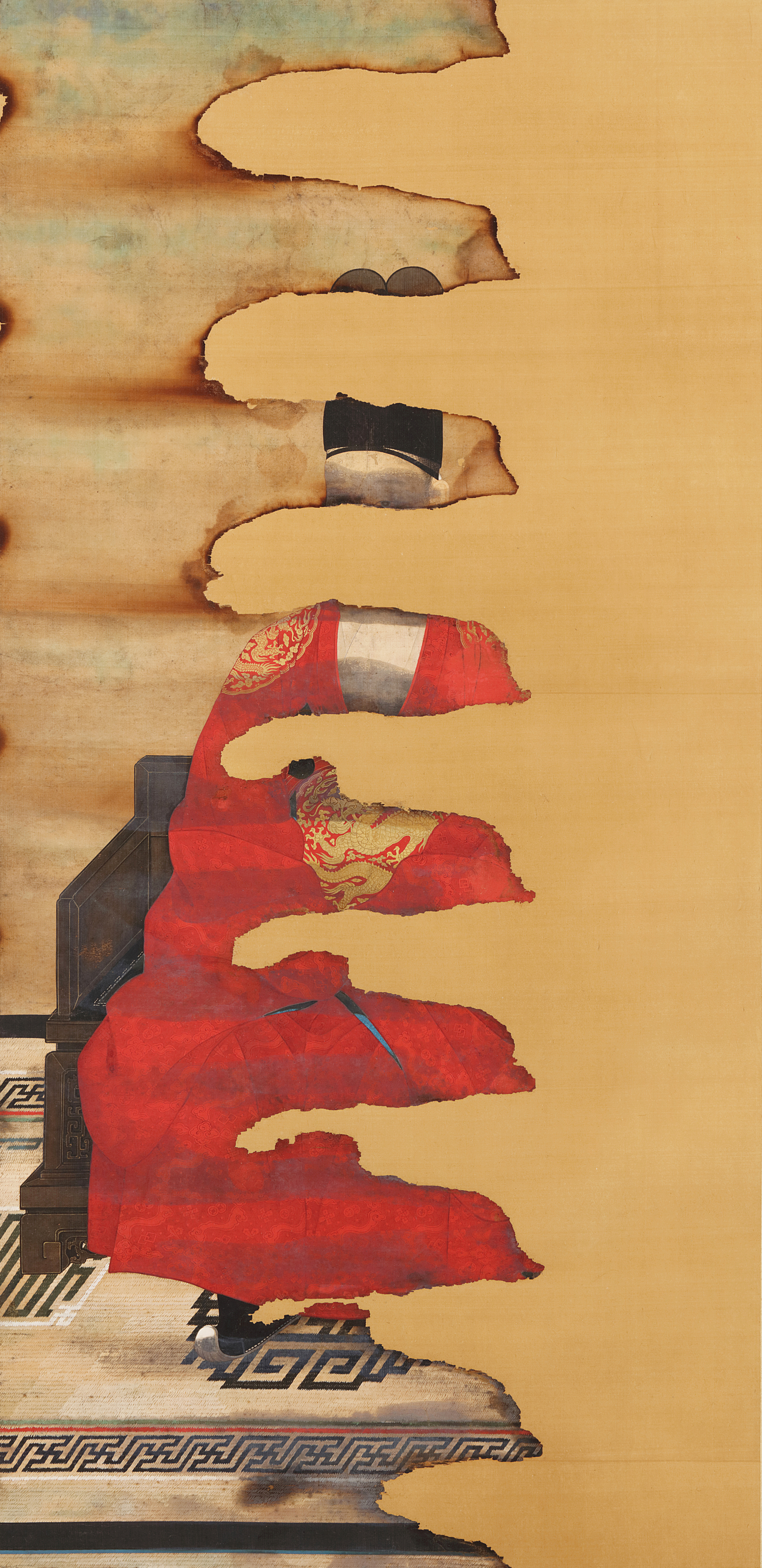
- State portrait, which was heavily damaged in the 1954 Busan fire

King of Joseon
- Reign: 13 December 1834 – 25 July 1849
- Enthronement: 18 December 1834; Sungjeongjeon, Gyeonghuigung
- Predecessor: Sunjo
- Successor: Cheoljong
- Regent: Queen Dowager Myeonggyeong (1834–1841)

Grand Heir of Joseon
- Tenure: 31 October 1830 – 13 December 1834
- Investiture: Injeongjeon, Changdeokgung
- Predecessor: Grand Heir San
- Successor: None
- Born: 8 September 1827; Gyeongchunjeon, Changgyeonggung, Hanseong, Joseon
- Died: 25 July 1849 (aged 21); Junghuidang, Changdeokgung, Hanseong, Joseon
- Burial: Gyeongneung, Donggureung Cluster, Guri, South Korea
- Spouses: Queen Hyohyeon (m. 1837; died 1843) Queen Hyojeong (m. 1844)
- Issue Detail: 1 daughter
Names
- Yi Hwan (이환; 李烉)
Era dates
- Adopted the era name of the Qing dynasty (Note: Dogwang (Daoguang) (도광; 道光): 1834–1849)
Regnal name
- Chegeon Gyegeuk Jungjeong Gwangdae Jiseong Gwangdeok Hongun Janghwa (체건계극중정광대지성광덕홍운장화; 體健繼極中正光大至聖廣德弘運章化) (Note: Known as honorific name (존호; 尊號) in the Sinosphere, its closest equivalent in the English-speaking world is the regnal name.)
Posthumous name
- Joseon: Great King Jangsuk Gyeongmun Wimu Myeongin Cheolhyo (장숙경문위무명인철효대왕; 莊肅經文緯武明仁哲孝大王); Korean Empire: Emperor Gyeongmun Wimu Myeongin Cheolhyo Seong (경문위무명인철효성황제; 經文緯武明仁哲孝成皇帝) (Note: The posthumous name bestowed by China was notably omitted as a sign of the country's "independence".); Qing dynasty: Jangsuk (장숙; 莊肅)
Temple name
- Heonjong (헌종; 憲宗)
- Clan: Jeonju Yi
- Dynasty: Yi
- Father: King Munjo
- Mother: Queen Sinjeong
- Religion: Confucianism (Neo-Confucianism)

Korean name
- Hangul: 헌종
- Hanja: 憲宗
- Lit.: "Exemplar Ancestor"
- RR: Heonjong
- MR: Hŏnjong

Art name
- Hangul: 원헌
- Hanja: 元軒
- RR: Wonheon
- MR: Wŏnhŏn

Courtesy name
- Hangul: 문응
- Hanja: 文應
- RR: Muneung
- MR: Munŭng

Heonjong (Korean: 헌종; Hanja: 憲宗; 8 September 1827 – 25 July 1849), (Note: In the Korean calendar (lunisolar), he was born on the 18th day of the 7th lunar month and died on the 6th day of the 6th lunar month.) personal name Yi Hwan, was the 24th monarch of Joseon. The only son of Crown Prince Hyomyeong, he acceded to the throne at the age of 7, upon the death of his grandfather, King Sunjo. Following the establishment of the Korean Empire, he was honored as Emperor Seong.

== Biography ==
Yi Hwan was born to Crown Princess Jo and Crown Prince Hyomyeong on 8 September 1827 in Gyeongchunjeon (경춘전; 景春殿) within Changdeok Palace. It was said that when the day before he was born, she dreamt of giving her son a box containing a tree carved with jade, and on the day of his birth, a group of cranes flew from the front room and went around for a long time. She and the others considered it to be strange.

The young Heonjong ascended to the throne in 1834 at the age of 7 after his grandfather, King Sunjo, died. Heonjong was the youngest monarch to ascend the throne in Joseon's history. Like King Sunjo, Heonjong took the throne at a young age and his grandmother, Queen Sunwon served as queen regent. Although King Heonjong ascended to the throne, he had no political control over Joseon. When Heonjong reached adulthood, Queen Sunwon refused to give up control. In 1840, the control over the kingdom was then handed down to the Andong Kim clan, the family of his grandmother Queen Sunwon, following the anti-Catholic Gihae persecution of 1839. During Heonjong's reign, he built the Nakseonjae complex and insisted that his beloved concubine, Kim Gyeong-bin, be given sole use of the complex which was an unprecedented move in Joseon's history.

King Heonjong died after reigning for 15 years in 1849 at the age of 21. He was buried at the Gyeongneung tomb within the Donggureung Tomb Cluster in Seoul, where several kings and queens of the Joseon Dynasty were buried, with Queen Hyohyeon and Queen Hyojeong. As King Heonjong died without an heir, the throne passed to a distant descendant of King Yeongjo, King Cheoljong.

As was customary with the Annals of the Joseon Dynasty, the chronicle of Heonjong's reign was compiled after his death, in 1851. The compilation of the 16-volume chronicle was supervised by Jo In-yeong, her mother's uncle.

== Family ==
- Father: King Munjo (문조대왕; 18 September 1809 – 25 June 1830)
  - Grandfather: King Sunjo (순조대왕; 29 July 1790 – 13 December 1834)
  - Grandmother: Queen Sunwon (순원왕후), of the (new) Andong Kim clan (신 안동 김씨; 8 June 1789 – 21 September 1857)
- Mother: Queen Sinjeong (신정왕후), of the Pungyang Jo clan (풍양 조씨; 9 January 1809 – 23 May 1890)
  - Grandfather: Jo Man-yeong (조만영), Internal Prince Pungeun (풍은부원군; 1776–1846)
  - Grandmother: Internal Princess Consort Deokan (덕안부부인), of the Eunjin Song clan (은진 송씨; 1776–1834)

Consort(s) and their respective issue

- Queen Hyohyeon (효현왕후), of the (new) Andong Kim clan (신 안동 김씨; 15 April 1828 – 6 October 1843)
- Queen Hyojeong (효정왕후), of the Namyang Hong clan (남양 홍씨; 22 February 1831 – 2 January 1904)
- Concubine Gyeong (경빈), of the Gwangsan Kim clan (광산 김씨; 21 September 1832 – 1 June 1907)
- Concubine Jeong (정빈), of the Haepyeong Yun clan (해평 윤씨; 1833–?)
- Sugui (숙의), of the Gimhae Kim clan (김해 김씨; 1814–1895)
  - Unnamed daughter (1848)

== Ancestry ==
Ancestors of Heonjong of Joseon

King Jangjo (장조대왕)
King Jeongjo (정조대왕)
Queen Heongyeong, of the Pungsan Hong clan (헌경왕후 풍산 홍씨) (Note: Granddaughter of Hong Hyeon-bo (홍현보) and niece of Lady Hong; see below.)
King Sunjo (순조대왕)
Park Jun-won (박준원)
Concubine Su, of the Bannam Park clan (수빈 반남 박씨)
Lady, of the Wonju Won clan (원주 원씨)
King Munjo (문조대왕)
Kim I-jung (김이중)
Kim Jo-sun, Internal Prince Yeongan (영안부원군 김조순)
Lady, of the Pyongsan Shin clan (평산 신씨)
Queen Sunwon, of the (new) Andong Kim clan (순원왕후 신 안동 김씨)
Shim Geon-ji (심건지)
Internal Princess Consort Cheongyang, of the Cheongsong Shim clan (청양부부인 청송 심씨)
Lady, of the Jeonju Yi clan (전주 이씨)
King Heonjong
Jo Eom (조엄)
Jo Jin-gwan (조진관)
Lady, of the Pungsan Hong clan (풍산 홍씨) (Note: Daughter of Hong Hyeon-bo (홍현보) and aunt of Queen Heongyeong; see above.)
Jo Man-yeong, Internal Prince Pungeun (풍은부원군 조만영)
Hong Ik-bin (홍익빈)
Lady, of the Namyang Hong clan (남양 홍씨)
Lady, of the Gigye Yu clan (기계 유씨)
Queen Sinjeong, of the Pungyang Jo clan (신정왕후 풍양 조씨)
Song Si-yeon (송시연)
Internal Princess Consort Deokan, of the Eunjin Song clan (덕안부부인 은진 송씨)
Lady, of the Andong Kim clan (안동 김씨)

== In popular culture ==
- Portrayed by Jung Hae-in in the 2018 film Heung-boo: The Revolutionist.
- Portrayed by Nam Da-reum in the 2022 film A Birth.

== See also ==
- History of Korea
- List of monarchs of Korea
- Styles and titles in Joseon
- Politics of Joseon

== Notes ==
Heonjong of Joseon House of Yi Born: 8 September 1827 Died: 25 July 1849
Royal titles
Preceded by Sunjo	King of Joseon; 13 December 1834 – 25 July 1849	Succeeded by Cheoljong
