= Queen Sinjeong =

Queen regent of Joseon (1809–1890)

Queen Sinjeong 신정왕후 神貞王后
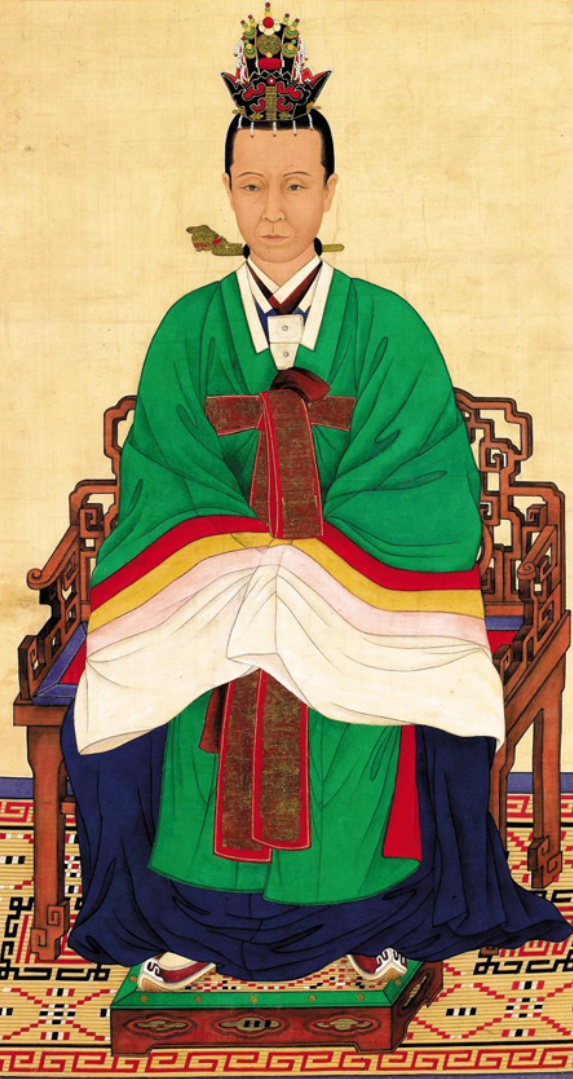

Queen regent of Joseon
- Regency: 8 December 1863 – 13 February 1873 with Grand Prince Heungseon
- Predecessor: Queen Sunwon
- Successor: Queen Min
- Monarch: King Gojong of Joseon

Grand queen dowager of Joseon
- Tenure: 10 August 1857 – 17 April 1890
- Predecessor: Queen Sunwon
- Successor: Dynasty and title abolished

Queen dowager of Joseon
- Tenure: 19 November 1834 – 10 August 1857
- Predecessor: Queen Sunwon
- Successor: Queen Hyojeong

Crown Princess of Joseon
- Tenure: 11 October 1819 – 6 May 1830
- Predecessor: Crown Princess Hong
- Successor: Crown Princess Min
- Born: 9 January 1809; Ssanghojeong, Dupo, Dumobang, Hanseong, Joseon
- Died: 23 May 1890 (aged 81); Heungbokjeon Hall, Gyeongbok Palace, Hanseong, Joseon
- Burial: Sureung
- Spouse: Crown Prince Hyomyeong
- Issue: Heonjong of Joseon
Posthumous name
- 효유헌성선경정인자혜홍덕순화문광원성숙렬명수협천융목수령희강현정휘안흠륜홍경태운창복희상의모예헌돈장계지경훈철범신정왕후
- House: Pungyang Jo
- Father: Jo Man-yeong
- Mother: Internal Princess Consort Deokan of the Eunjin Song clan

Queen Sinjeong (Korean: 신정왕후; Hanja: 神貞王后; 9 January 1809 – 23 May 1890), of the Pungyang Jo clan, was the only wife of Crown Prince Hyomyeong and mother of Heonjong of Joseon. She was never formally a Queen but was known as Queen Dowager Jo (조대비) during the reign of her son before Cheoljong of Joseon granted her a proper title, Queen Dowager Hyoyu (효유왕대비).

After the previous king died, she was known as Grand Queen Dowager Hyoyu (효유대왕대비), and served as nominal regent during Gojong's minority, between 1864 and 1873. Although she left all de facto power to the King's father, Grand Internal Prince Heungseon, and only kept the formal title.

== Biography ==
=== Birth and family background ===
Lady Jo was born on 9 January 1809 into the Pungyang Jo clan to Jo Man-yeong and Lady Song of the Eunjin Song clan during King Sunjo's 8th year of reign. Through her paternal great-grandmother, Lady Jo is a first cousin twice removed, or a second cousin, of Lady Hyegyeong; who was the grandmother of her future father-in-law, King Sunjo, as well as a 5th great-granddaughter of Princess Jeongmyeong and a 6th great-granddaughter of Queen Inmok and King Seonjo.

=== Marriage and death of husband ===
In 1819, she became Crown Princess Consort when she married Crown Prince Hyomyeong, thus granting her mother the royal title of “Internal Princess Consort Deokan” (덕안부부인; 德安府夫人) and her father, “Internal Prince Pungeun” (풍은부원군; 豊恩府院君). The Crown Princess Consort gave birth to her only son, the future King Heonjeong, on 8 September 1827.

From 1827 and then on, her husband had acted as regent for his father when he was ill, but died at the age of 20 in the summer of 1830. During this time, her royal status was unspecified but was referred to Queen Dowager Jo. Her life was similar to that of Queen Sohye who never became Queen, but was the mother of King Seongjong.

Struggling with his illness, her father-in-law King Sunjo soon followed and died on 13 December 1834.

Soon after the late King's death, the Jo clan seized control over the royal court from the Andong Kim clan. The clan rose to prominence, pushing out the Andong Kim clan that had wielded power since the King Sunjo regime.

=== Accession of son ===
Her son, Heonjong of Joseon, became king in 1834 and that same year, her mother died.

Through the influence of her mother-in-law, Queen Sunwon, her son married in 1837 to a daughter from her clan, the Andong Kim. She was posthumously honored as Queen Hyohyeon after she died in 1843 at the age of 15.

After the mourning period, her son eventually remarried in 1844 to a daughter from the Namyang Hong clan. However, with the death of the clan leader Jo Man-yeong, the Queen Dowager's father, in 1846, control of the kingdom once again fell into the hands of the Andong Kim clan.

Anti-Catholic in nature, the Pungyang Jo clan dominated the court when King Heonjeong blamed the Andong Kim clan for being soft on Catholics and launched a persecution, killing hundreds of Catholics, including three French missionary priests.

=== Death of son, accession of distant relative ===
Her son died childless on 25 July 1849, and was succeeded by a distant relative, Cheoljong of Joseon three days later on 28 July. After the death of her son, she was given the title Grand Queen Dowager Hyoyu.

Queen Dowager Myeonggyeong then decided to adopt a male relative after the death of her grandson, King Heonjong, as he had no issue with either of his wives thus having the lineage of King Jeongjo died out.

Some officials suggested that a distant royal member, Yi Ha-jeon (이하전), could succeed the throne. But he was eight years old, as well as a descendant of Grand Internal Prince Deokheung, and merely an 11th cousin once removed to Heonjong. The grandmother of the late king, Queen Dowager Myeonggyeong (King Sunjo's widow), preferred to choose the next king herself from closer relatives.

From those relatives, she selected Yi Won-beom, one of few living descendants of King Yeongjo and a second cousin once removed to Heonjong. She decided to adopt him as the heir and sent officials to ask his family to return to the mainland from Ganghwa Island.

When Yi Won-beom arrived in the palace, he was first given the royal title of "Prince Deokwan" (덕완군), and descendants of Prince Euneon were again regarded as royalty.

On July 28, 1849, Cheoljong ascended the throne in Changdeok Palace, and the Queen Dowager served as regent for two years. Once again, with her influence, the Queen Dowager Myeonggyeong had Cheoljong marry the daughter of Kim Mun-geun, who was a third cousin of the Queen Dowager, on 15 November 1851. The daughter was later known as Queen Cheorin.

Following the wedding of Cheoljong in 1851, the Queen Dowager ended her regency. However, politics were still controlled by Queen Sunwon's family, the Andong Kim clan. But when the Grand Queen Dowager died in 1857, all power was drawn to the Pungyang Jo clan and being the most senior member as Grand Queen Dowager, she was able to enforce her family's influence.

Queen Cheorin had her only son in 1858, named Yi Yung-jun, but the infant died less than a year later in 1859.

In January 1864, King Cheoljong died without an heir, but had a daughter from a concubine who lived until 1872.

=== Selection of a new king 1864 ===
The selection of the next king was in the hands of three dowagers: (i) Queen Dowager Hyoyu, mother of King Heonjong; (ii) Queen Dowager Myeongheon, King Heonjong's second wife; and (iii) Queen Dowager Myeongsun, Cheoljong's wife.

Queen Cheorin, the queen consort of Cheoljong and a member of the Andong Kim clan, claimed the right to choose the next king, despite the fact that traditionally, the eldest queen dowager is the one with the authority to select the new king. Cheoljong's second cousin-in-law, (later) Grand Queen Dowager Hyoyu (Queen Sinjeong), who too had risen to prominence by intermarriage with the Yi family, currently held this title.

The "right of designation" resided, accordingly, with Grand Queen Dowager Sinjeong, as she was the oldest of the dowagers.

Queen Sinjeong saw an opportunity to advance the cause of the Pungyang Jo clan, the only true rival of the Andong Kim clan in Korean politics. As Cheoljong became increasingly ill, Queen Sinjeong was approached by Yi Ha-eung, a descendant of King Injo (r. 1623–1649), whose father was made an adoptive son of Prince Eunsin, a nephew of King Yeongjo (r. 1724–1776).

The branch that Yi Ha-eung's family belonged to was an obscure line of descent of the Yi clan, which survived the often deadly political intrigue that frequently embroiled the Joseon court by forming no affiliation with any factions. Yi Ha-eung himself was ineligible for the throne due to a law that dictated that any possible heir to the kingdom be part of the generation after the most recent incumbent of the throne, but his second son Yi Myeong-bok, later Emperor Gojong, was a possible successor to the throne.

The Pungyang Jo clan saw that Yi Myeong-bok was only twelve years old and would not be able to rule in his own name until he came of age, and that they could easily influence Yi Ha-eung, who would be acting as regent for the future king. As soon as news of Cheoljong's death reached Yi Ha-eung through his intricate network of spies in the palace, he and the Pungyang Jo clan took the hereditary royal seal — an object that was considered necessary for a legitimate reign to take place and aristocratic recognition to be received — effectively giving her absolute power to select the successor to the throne. By the time Cheoljong's death had become a known fact, the Andong Kim clan was powerless according to law as the seal lay in the hands of the Grand Queen Dowager Sinjeong.

In an apocryphal story, Queen Cheorin sent a minister to fetch the son of Yi Ha-eung, eleven-year-old Yi Myeong-bok, who was flying a kite in a palace garden. The son was brought to the palace in a sedan chair, where Queen Sinjeong rushed forward and called him her son, thus producing the new Joseon king, King Gojong, adopted son of Crown Prince Hyomyeong. This story may or may not be true.

These facts, however, are known to be correct. On 16 January 1864, Yi Myeong-bok was appointed the Prince of Ikseong by Dowager Queen Sinjeong. The next day, his father was granted the title Heungseon Daewongun. On 21 January, Yi Myeong-bok was enthroned as King Gojong, and Dowager Queen Sinjeong began her regency. Yi was apparently chosen because "he was the only suitable surviving male member of the Yi clan and closest by blood to the royal house".

=== Events of the regency ===
Since Gojong was so young, Queen Sinjeong invited the Daewongun to assist his son in ruling. She virtually renounced her right to be regent in 1866, and though she remained the titular regent, the Daewongun was in fact the true ruler.

But when the Grand Queen Dowager stepped down from regency, Grand Internal Prince Heungseon had immediately started to drive out the influence of the Jo clan. This eventually brought in her adoptive daughter-in-law Queen Min's intervention as she became involved in Royal politics. Thus bringing down the power and influence of the king's father and his supporters, and becoming regent while also bringing in the influence of her family, the Yeoheung Min clan.

=== Death and posthumous titles ===
Queen Sinjeong died on 4 June 1890 during Gojong's 27th year of reign. Nine years after her death, during the 3rd year reign of Emperor Gwangmu, she was given the posthumous title of "Shinjeong, the Assistful Empress” (신정익황후; 神貞翼皇后), and Crown Prince Hyomyeong was given the posthumous title of "Emperor Munjoik" (문조익황제; 文祖翼皇帝).

== Family ==
- Father
  - Jo Man-yeong (조만영; 趙萬永; 20 June 1776 – 2 December 1846)
- Mother
  - Internal Princess Consort Deokan of the Eunjin Song clan (덕안부부인 은진 송씨; 德安府夫人 恩津 宋氏; 1776–1834)
- Siblings
  - Older brother - Jo Byeong-gwi (조병귀; 趙秉龜; 1796–?)
  - Older brother - Jo Byeong-gi (조병기; 趙秉夔; 1798–1858); became the adoptive son of his uncle Jo In-yeong (조인영; 趙寅永; 1782–1850)
  - Younger sister - Lady Jo of the Pungyang Jo clan (풍양 조씨; 豊壤 趙氏; 1811–?)
  - Younger sister - Lady Jo of the Pungyang Jo clan (풍양 조씨; 豊壤 趙氏; 1812–1865)
  - Younger sister - Lady Jo of the Pungyang Jo clan (풍양 조씨; 豊壤 趙氏; 1813–?)
- Husband
  - Yi Yeong, Crown Prince Hyomyeong (이영 효명세자; 18 September 1809 – 25 June 1830)
    - Mother-in-law - Queen Sunwon of the Andong Kim clan (순원왕후 김씨; 8 June 1789 – 21 September 1857)
    - Father-in-law - Yi Gong, King Sunjo of Joseon (조선 순조; 29 July 1790 – 13 December 1834)
- Issue
  - Son - Yi Hwan, King Heonjong of Joseon (조선 헌종; 8 September 1827 – 25 July 1849)
    - Daughter-in-law - Queen Hyohyeon of the Andong Kim clan (효현왕후 김씨; 27 April 1828 – 18 October 1843) — No issue.
    - Daughter-in-law - Queen Hyojeong of the Namyang Hong clan (효정왕후 홍씨; 6 March 1831 – 2 January 1904) — No issue.
  - Adoptive son - Yi Myeong-bok, Emperor Gojong of Korea (광무태황제; 8 September 1852 – 21 January 1919)
    - Adoptive daughter-in-law - Min Ja-yeong, Empress Myeongseong of the Yeoheung Min clan (명성태황후 민씨; 17 November 1851 – 8 October 1895)

== In popular culture ==
- Portrayed by Kim Yong-rim in the 2001–2002 KBS2 TV series Empress Myeongseong.
- Portrayed by Jung Hye-sun in the 2012 MBC TV series Dr. Jin.
- Portrayed by Chae Soo-bin in the 2016 KBS2 TV series Love in the Moonlight.
- Portrayed by Kim Bo Yun in the 2020 TV series King Maker: The Change of Destiny.
- Portrayed by Jo Yeon-hee in the 2020 tvN TV series Mr. Queen.

== See also ==
Society in the Joseon dynasty

Empress Myeongseong

Heungseon Daewongun

Queen Sinjeong Pungyang Jo clan
Royal titles
Preceded by Queen Dowager Myeonggyeong (Sunwon) of the Andong Kim clan	Queen dowager of Joseon; 19 November 1834 – 10 August 1857	Succeeded by Queen Dowager Hyojeong of the Namyang Hong clan
Preceded by Grand Queen Dowager Myeonggyeong (Sunwon) of the Andong Kim clan	Grand queen dowager of Joseon; 10 August 1857 – 17 April 1890	Succeeded by title abolished
