= Tonny Jensen (basketball) =

Australian basketball player

Personal information
- Nationality: Australian
- Born: 7 September 1971 (age 54) Wagga Wagga, Australia

Sport
- Sport: Basketball

Tonny Jensen (born 7 September 1971) is an Australian basketball player. He competed in the men's tournament at the 1996 Summer Olympics.
