= Yang Hee-seung =

South Korean basketball player

Personal information
- Nationality: South Korean
- Born: 1 March 1974 (age 51)

Sport
- Sport: Basketball

Yang Hee-seung (Korean: 양희승; Hanja: 梁熙勝; born 1 March 1974) is a South Korean basketball player. He competed in the men's tournament at the 1996 Summer Olympics.
