= Omniscient Reader's Viewpoint =

South Korean web novel

- First webtoon adaptation print volume cover, featuring Kim Dokja

전지적 독자 시점 RR: Jeonjijeok dokja sijeom MR: Chŏnjijŏk tokcha sichŏm
- Genre: Action, fantasy, metafiction
- Author: Sing Shong
- Illustrator: Blackbox for web novel, Sleepy-C for webtoon
- Publisher: Munpia
- English publisher: Ize Press
- Webtoon service: Naver Webtoon (South Korea); Line Manga (Japan); Webtoon (English)
- Original run: January 6, 2018 – February 2, 2020
- Volumes: 20 novel volumes
- Anime television series
- Licensed by: Crunchyroll

Omniscient Reader's Viewpoint

Japanese name
- Kanji: 全知的な読者の視点から
- Kana: ぜんちてきなどくしゃのしてんから
Transcriptions
- Romanization: Zenchiteki na Dokusha no Shiten kara

Omniscient Reader's Viewpoint, alternatively translated as Omniscient Reader (Korean: 전지적 독자 시점), is a South Korean web novel written by singNsong. It was first published on January 6, 2018, on the platform Munpia, and ended on February 2, 2020. Naver Webtoon published a currently ongoing webtoon adaptation created by Redice Studio for the Korean version and Line Webtoon for the English version in 2020. An anime television series adaptation has been announced.

== Plot ==
Kim Dokja is an ordinary 28-year-old office worker in an exploitative gaming company. His only hobby is reading webnovels to and from his office. Kim Dokja is the only reader of the webnovel Three Ways to Survive in a Ruined World, often shortened to Ways of Survival or TWSA, for 13 years of his life, due to the absurd length of the novel (3,149 chapters).

However, on the day that the last chapter is meant to be released, the mysterious author "tls123" emails him the attached file of the novel as a gift. Unfortunately, the epilogue is nowhere to be found, and when the clock hits 7:00 pm KST, a dokkaebi appears. He realises that this is how Three Ways to Survive in a Ruined World began, but refuses to believe it until the first scenario begins: "Kill one or more living organisms."

The world as he knew it followed the plot of the story. Being the only one to have fully read the webnovel, with the only copy of the novel, Kim Dokja is determined to create a different ending for his favourite characters and story.

== Characters ==
Kim Dokja
Kim Dokja (김독자; Gim Dokja) is the primary protagonist of the series. He is a young man working an office job who has a passion for reading, his favorite novel being Three Ways to Survive in a Ruined World (Also commonly referred to as the TWSA throughout the novel). However, his life takes a drastic turn when the events of the novel start unfolding in real life, and he is the only one who is aware of how the world will come to an end. With this knowledge, Dokja uses his understanding of the story to create the ending he wanted as the one reader of the novel, consequently changing the world for better and worse.
Yoo Joonghyuk
Yoo Joonghyuk (유중혁; Yu Junghyeok) is the main protagonist of the novel Dokja read and one of the most powerful characters of the original web novel, Three Ways to Survive in a Ruined World. He is also one of the three central protagonists of the novel alongside Kim Dokja and Han Sooyoung. His constellation is unknown (although revealed later), and he is fundamental to the story because of his regression ability, among many other powerful skills.
Han Sooyoung
Han Sooyoung (한수영; Han Suyeong) is one of the three central protagonists of the novel alongside Kim Dokja and Yoo Joonghyuk. She is initially considered a problematic anomaly due to her immense knowledge of the TWSA and its future events almost rivalling that of Kim Dokja's, but as the story progresses she becomes integral to the development of events within the story, often taking up the unofficial leadership position Kim Dokja vacates frequently. She has an interesting relationship with Kim Dokja where it is revealed that she plagiarized his favorite novel TWSA and sold a better version of it due to her writing abilities. Her personal skill, [Avatar] is considered to be unique one among writers.
Uriel
Uriel (Demon-Like Judge of Fire) - constellation belonging to the "Eden" nebula and contellations of "absolute good", being the representation of an archangel, and one of the biggest supporters of Dokja and his companions. Notably, she sponsors one of Kim Dokja's closest companions, Jung Heewon (정희원; Jeong Huiwon)
Sun Wukong
Sun Wukong (Great Sage Heaven's Equal, Most Ancient Liberator) is a constellation belonging to the "Emperor" nebula, a representation of a known Chinese myth, and Dokja’s loyal supporter. Later on in the story, he considers Kim Dokja as something akin to a brother.
Persephone
Persephone (Queen of the Darkest Spring) is a co-leader of the "Underworld" nebula and the wife of Hades. She is a powerful constellation that took interest in Dokja at the beginning of the story. She helps him numerous times to gain his footing once he's been made into a Constellation and earn the respect and fear of his fellow Constellations. She's part of the Gourmet Association as later seen in the novel.
Hades
Hades (Father of the Richest Night) is the leader/king of the "Underworld" nebula and one of the three major "Olympus" gods, that took interest in Kim Dokja at the beginning of the story.
Abyssal Black Flame Dragon
Abyssal Black Flame Dragon is the leader of the "Black Cloud" nebula, standing at the side of absolute evil. At the beginning of the story he offered to become Dokja's sponsor, and despite being turned down, he remained loyal to Dokja's channel and became one of his biggest supporters. He initially sponsors one of Kim Dokja's closest allies and an important member of the protagonist trio, Han Sooyoung. Quite humorously, he is mentioned to be the frequent sponsors of teenage edgelords (chunnibyou).
Secretive Plotter
Secretive Plotter is a mysterious constellation that appeared in Dokja's channel at the start of the story. Though unassuming at first, his interest in Dokja and his group becomes more and more apparent throughout the story, as his messages keep appearing in the channel and his gaze keeps following their every step. It was later revealed that Secretive Plotter was an Outer God playing in the role of a constellation. It becomes apparent to the readers during the story's progression that this character is loosely based on Nyarlathotep (i.e. "the crawling chaos"). The true identity of the character is known to be a major plot point.

== Media ==
=== Web novel ===
The original Korean web novel, written by 'sing N song' was first published on January 6, 2018, on the platform Munpia, and ended on February 2, 2020. The official sources are Munpia and Naver.

After the end of the original story, a sequel, labeled as side stories of the original novel (not to be confused with the bonus chapters), began publication on the official sites on February 15, 2024.

=== E-book ===
Since publication as a web novel, Omniscient Reader's Viewpoint has been revised and edited into a completed e-book consisting of 20 total volumes. These 20 volumes have also been published physically by Bichae, a subsidiary of Naver. The published e-book contains several changes to the web novel, mostly consisting of small dialogue omissions and other such minor changes. The only major changes to the overall plot are the character motivations in the "Peace Land" arc.

=== Physical publication ===
Yen Press released the first volume of the English physical novel on July 22, 2025.

No.	Release date	ISBN
1	July 22, 2025	979-8-4009-0352-6
2	November 18, 2025	979-8-4009-0373-1
3	March 31, 2026	979-8-4009-0376-2
4	July 21, 2026	979-8-4009-0379-3
5	November 17, 2026	979-8-4009-0551-3
6	March 30, 2027	979-8-4009-0554-4

Physical publications into other languages have also been made. 23 Thai volumes have been published by Levon. 12 Taiwanese volumes by Interstellar Publishing (深空出版), and 3 Simplified Chinese volumes by 磨铁图书 (see Chinese: 全知讀者視角).

=== Webtoon ===
An ongoing webtoon adaptation of the e-book, illustrated by Sleepy-C under Redice Studios launched on Naver on May 26, 2020. Its first two collected volumes were released by A.Tempo Media on December 22, 2020, with eighteen collected volumes released as of March 2026.

The webtoon was published digitally in English by Line Webtoon on August 18, 2020. In June 2023, IZE Press, an imprint of Yen Press, announced that they have licensed both the manhwa and novel for English publication.

==== Volumes ====
No.	Original release date	Original ISBN	English release date	English ISBN
01	December 22, 2020	979-11-6428-401-6	December 12, 2023	979-8-4009-0106-5
02	December 22, 2020	979-11-6428-402-3	March 19, 2024	979-8-4009-0129-4
03	July 21, 2021	979-11-6428-543-3	June 18, 2024	979-8-4009-0161-4
04	February 15, 2022	979-11-6428-704-8	September 17, 2024	979-8-4009-0162-1
05	June 8, 2022	979-11-6428-784-0	December 17, 2024	979-8-4009-0281-9
06	August 10, 2022	979-11-6428-998-1	March 18, 2025	979-8-4009-0282-6
07	September 7, 2022	979-11-6428-884-7	June 17, 2025	979-8-4009-0284-0
08	November 18, 2022	979-11-6428-960-8	September 23, 2025	979-8-4009-0285-7
09	March 10, 2023	979-11-6963-079-5	December 16, 2025	979-8-4009-0440-0
10	March 25, 2024	979-11-6963-418-2	April 21, 2026	979-8-4009-0441-7
11	December 23, 2024	979-11-7304-237-9	July 21, 2026	979-8-4009-0442-4
12	December 23, 2024	979-11-7304-238-6	October 20, 2026	979-8-4009-0443-1
13	June 24, 2025	979-11-7304-516-5	January 19, 2027	979-8-4009-0444-8
14	June 24, 2025	979-11-7304-517-2	April 20, 2027	979-8-4009-0445-5
15	September 29, 2025	979-11-7304-977-4	—	—
16	September 29, 2025	979-11-7304-978-1	—	—
17	December 5, 2025	979-11-7556-186-1	—	—
18	February 20, 2026	979-11-7556-393-3	—	—

=== Film ===
Munpia announced on September 18, 2019, that they had signed a contract with Realize Pictures to adapt Omniscient Reader's Viewpoint into five feature-length films. In May 2023, Ahn Hyo-seop and Lee Min-ho were confirmed to be offered the leading roles of Kim Dokja and Yoo Joonghyuk respectively.

The film's casting was officially confirmed on January 24, 2024, featuring Kim Ji-soo as Lee Ji-hye, Chae Soo-bin as Yoo Sang-ah, Nana as Jung Hee-won, Shin Seung-ho as Lee Hyun-sung, Park Ho-san as Gong Pil-du, and Choi Young-joon as Han Myung-oh. Kim Byung-woo served as the director, while Won Dong-yun took on the role of producer. The producer also assured that "the movie has now reached its halfway point and is well on its way to its final destination."

The film premiered in South Korea on July 23, 2025. As of October 2, 2025, the film has grossed $7.9 million worldwide. Critical reception of the film is mixed, scoring a 35% audience rating on the review aggregator website Rotten Tomatoes, with criticism directed towards the discrepancies between the novel's and film's plot.

=== Anime ===
At Anime Expo 2024, an anime television series adaptation was announced. Crunchyroll will stream the series.

=== Video game ===
In March 2025, Com2uS announced that they had secured publishing rights to an Omniscient Reader's Viewpoint video game. Developed by Offbeat, the game is scheduled to be released in 2028.
