= Jo Man-yeong =

Korean politician (1776–1846)

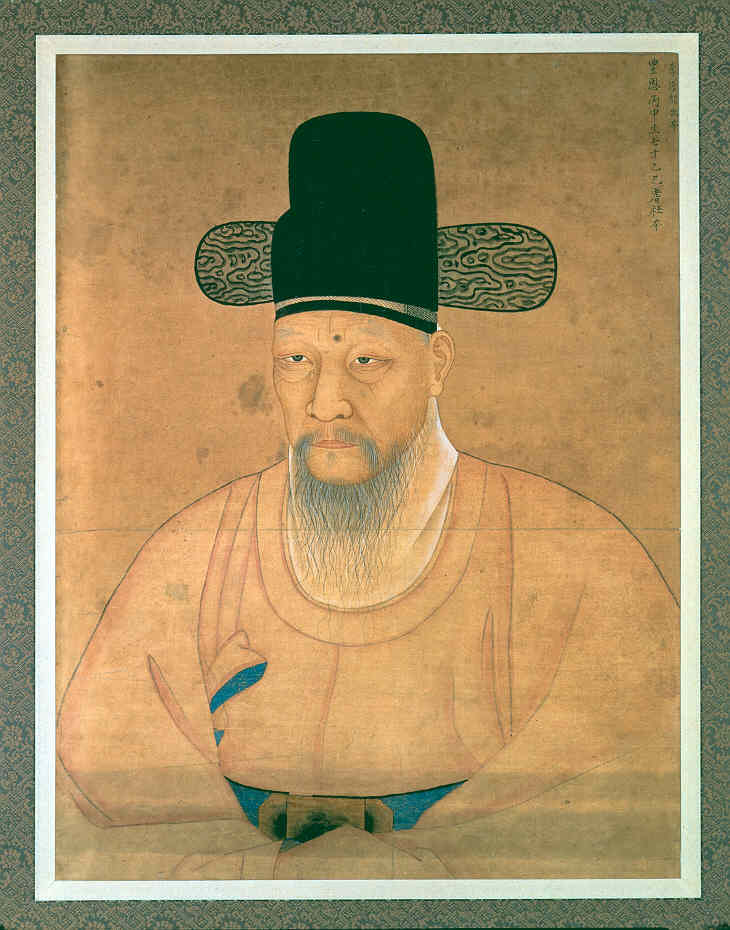

Korean name
- Hangul: 조만영
- Hanja: 趙萬永
- RR: Jo Manyeong
- MR: Cho Manyŏng

Art name
- Hangul: 석애
- Hanja: 石崖
- RR: Seokae
- MR: Sŏgae

Courtesy name
- Hangul: 윤경
- Hanja: 胤卿
- RR: Yungyeong
- MR: Yun'gyŏng

Posthumous name
- Hangul: 충경
- Hanja: 忠敬
- RR: Chunggyeong
- MR: Ch'unggyŏng

Jo Man-yeong (Korean: 조만영; Hanja: 趙萬永; 1776–1846) was a Korean politician and court minister of the Joseon period. He was the leader of the Pungyang Jo clan. The clan rose to prominence, pushing out the Andong Kim clan that had wielded power since the King Sunjo regime. However, with the death of Jo Man-yeong in 1846, control of the kingdom once again fell into the hands of the Andong Kim clan. He was the father of Queen Sinjeong and the maternal grandfather of Heonjong of Joseon. As his daughter posthumously became Queen consort, Jo was then honoured as Internal Prince Pungeun (Korean: 풍은부원군; Hanja: 豊恩府院君).

== Family ==
- Father
  - Jo Jin-gwan (1739–1808)
- Mother
  - Lady Hong of the Namyang Hong clan (1739–1799)
- Siblings
  - Younger brother - Jo Won-yeong (1777–1825)
  - Younger brother - Jo In-yeong (1782–1850)
  - Younger sister - Lady Jo of the Pungyang Jo clan
  - Younger sister - Lady Jo of the Pungyang Jo clan
  - Younger sister - Lady Jo of the Pungyang Jo clan
  - Younger sister - Lady Jo of the Pungyang Jo clan
- Spouse
  - Internal Princess Consort Deokan of the Eunjin Song clan (1776–1834)
- Children
  - Son - Jo Byeong-gwi
  - Son - Jo Byeong-gu (1801–1845)
  - Daughter - Queen Shinjeong of the Pungyang Jo clan (21 January 1809 – 4 June 1890)
    - Son-in-law - Yi Yeong, King Munjo (18 September 1809 – 25 June 1830)
  - Son - Jo Byeong-gi (1821–1858)
  - Daughter - Lady Jo of the Pungyang Jo clan
  - Daughter - Lady Jo of the Pungyang Jo clan (?–1865)
  - Daughter Lady Jo of the Pungyang Jo clan
