= Cho Dong-kee =

South Korean basketball player

Personal information
- Born: May 21, 1971 (age 55)
- Listed height: 6 ft 6 in (1.98 m)

Career information
- College: Chung-Ang University
- Playing career: 1997–present
- Position: Center

Career history
- 1997–2002: Ulsan Mobis Automons

- Cho Dong-kee
- Hangul: 조동기
- Hanja: 趙東紀
- RR: Jo Donggi
- MR: Cho Tonggi

Cho Dong-kee (born May 21, 1971) is a retired South Korean professional basketball player lastly with the KBL team Ulsan Mobis Automons.

== Achievements ==
=== Individual ===
- 2001: Korean KBL All-Star Game
