= Eugenio Soto (basketball) =

Puerto Rican basketball player

Personal information
- Nationality: Puerto Rican
- Born: 9 March 1972 (age 53); Aguadilla, Puerto Rico

Sport
- Sport: Basketball

Eugenio Soto (born 9 March 1972) is a Puerto Rican basketball player. He competed in the men's tournament at the 1996 Summer Olympics.
