= Chung Kyung-ho (basketball) =

South Korean basketball player

Personal information
- Nationality: South Korean
- Born: 14 June 1970 (age 54); Seoul, South Korea

Sport
- Sport: Basketball

Chung Kyung-ho (born 14 June 1970) is a South Korean basketball player. He competed in the men's tournament at the 1996 Summer Olympics.
