= Park (Korean surname) =

Korean family name (박)

- Hangul: 박
- RR: Bak
- MR: Pak
- IPA: [pak̚]

Percentage of family names in South Korea Kim Lee Park Choi Jung

Park (Korean: 박; pronounced [pak̚]), also spelled as Pak or Bak, is the third-most common surname in Korea, traditionally traced back to 1st century King Hyeokgeose Park and theoretically inclusive of all of his descendants. Park or Bak is usually assumed to come from the Korean noun Bak (박), meaning "gourd". As of the South Korean census of 2015, there were 4,192,074 people with the name in South Korea, or roughly 8.4% of the population.

== Founding legend ==
All the Park clans in Korea trace their ancestry back to the first king of Silla, Hyeokgeose. According to a legend, the leaders of the six clans of the Jinhan confederacy were gathering on a hilltop to choose a king, when they looked down and saw lightning strike at the foot of the Yangsan mountain and a white horse bow at the same place. When they went there to check, they found a red egg, which hatched a baby boy. They bathed the boy in the nearby stream and he was emitting bright light and the sun and the moon rose at the same time, indicating the divine birth of the child. Thus, the child was named Hyeokgeose, meaning "ruling with a bright light" and his clan name became Bak or "gourd" after the round shape of the egg he hatched from. At age 13, he was given the title geoseogan (거서간), the equivalent of "king" at the time. The birth legends of early Korean kings were necessary to validate the "divine" nature of their rule.

According to Yang Ju-dong's research, both 'no: 赫' and '朴' in '朴赫居世' are repeatedly written with the meaning of 'ᄇᆞᆰ' (밝다; lit. 'bright').

According to the Samguk Sagi, the Jin people called gourd as "park", and the first large egg looked similar to the shape of the gourd, so his last name become Park.

== Clans ==
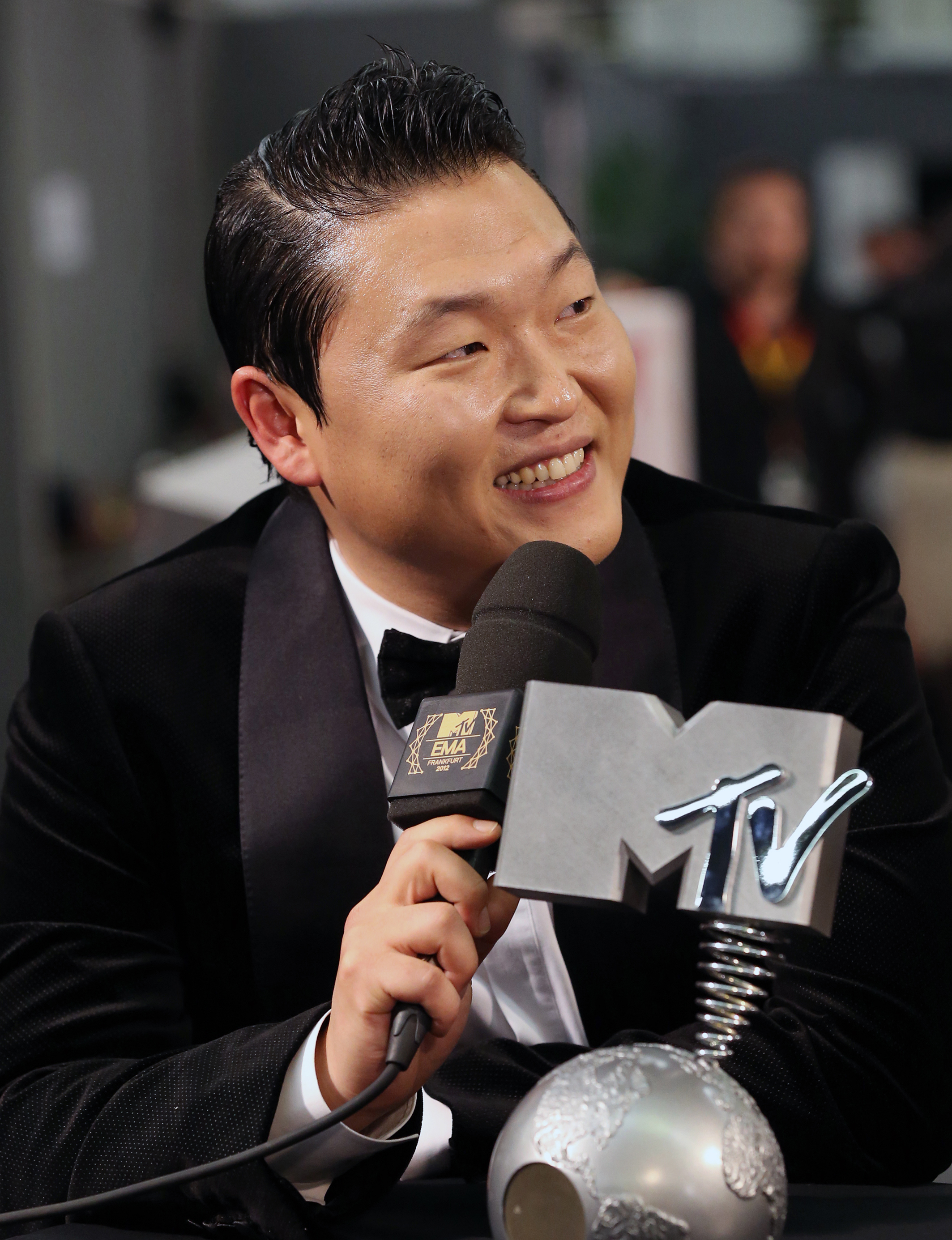
Park Jae Sang, better known as PSY, is a singer. He is from the Miryang Park clan.

As with other Korean surnames, different lineages, known as bon-gwan or clans, are inherited from a father by his children. These designate the region of Korea or paternal ancestor, from which they claim to originate. Out of the kings of Silla, ten had the Park surname. During the rule of King Pasa (80–112), the Park clans became divided and during the reign of King Gyeongmyeong (917–924) they became even more fractured, creating several lineages. This is when the nine Park clans named after the nine sons of Gyeongmyeong came into existence.

70–80% of the current bearers of the surname belong to the Miryang Park clan. In 2015, there were 314 Park clans in South Korea, with about 4.19 million people altogether.

The clans which produced the most number of notable people in Korean history are collectively called the "Eight Parks", these are: the Miryang Park clan, the Bannam Park clan (반남박씨), the Goryeong Park clan (고령박씨), the Hamyang Park clan (함양박씨), the Juksan Park clan (죽산박씨), the Suncheon Park clan (순천박씨), the Muan Park clan (무안박씨) and the Chungju Park clan (충주박씨).

Clan name (Region)	Clan progenitor	Percentage (%) (2015)
Miryang	Grand Prince Pak Ŏnch'im of Milseong, ultimately from Hyeokgeose of Silla	74.04
Hamyang	Grand Prince Pak Ŏnsin, ultimately from Hyeokgeose of Silla	3.9
Others	Ultimately from Hyeokgeose of Silla	3.8
Bannam (Naju)	Lord Hojang, ultimately from Hyeokgeose of Silla	3.8
Suncheon	Pak Yŏnggyu, Kyŏn Hwŏn's son-in-law, ultimately from Hyeokgeose of Silla	3.8
Juksan (Andong)	Grand Prince Ŭnnip of Juksan, ultimately from Hyeokgeose of Silla	1.5
Goryeong	Park Ŭnsŏng, Grand Prince of Goyang, ultimately from Hyeokgeose of Silla	1.0
Yeonghae (Yeongdeok)	Pak Chesang, ultimately from Hyeokgeose of Silla	0.7
Chungju	Pak Sang, ultimately from Hyeokgeose of Silla	0.8

== Position in society ==
House of Park
- Parent house: Itself
- Country: Korea
- Founded: 57 BC
- Founder: King Hyeokgeose
- Final ruler: King Gyeongae
- Titles: King of Silla
- Dissolution: Fall of Silla in 935

King Hyeokgeose was said to have founded the Korean kingdom of Silla at the age of thirteen in 57 BC. Pak was one of three houses of the Korean kingdom of Silla. Among the houses of, Pak, Kim, and Seok, princes rotated on the throne of Silla. According to historical records, all three houses have been recorded as having worshipped the founding father, Bak Hyeokgeose as their ancestral shrine. For example, the 4th king Talhae of Silla, the 9th king Beolhyu of Silla, the 10th king Naehae of Silla, the 11th king Jobun of Silla, the 12th king Cheomhae of Silla, the 14th King Yurye of Silla and the 15th king Girim of Silla were house of Seok, but according to the Samguk sagi Silla bongi, all of them worshipped Bak Hyeokgeose as their progenitor. In addition, the 13th king Michu of Silla, the 16th king Heulhae of Silla, the 17th king Naemul of Silla, the 18th king Silseong of Silla, the 19th king Nulji of Silla, the 20th king Jabi of Silla, the 21st king Soji of Silla, the 22nd king Jijeung of Silla, the 40th king Aejang of Silla, the 41st king Heondeok of Silla and the 42nd king Heungdeok of Silla are descendants of Kim Al-chi, but according to the Samguk sagi Silla bongi, all of them worshipped Bak Hyeokgeose as their progenitor. In addition, according to Samguk sagi, the Shrine Shingung(神宮) was founded in the birthplace of the progenitor Bak Hyeokgeose and every king has been recorded as paying their respects at this shrine. All of these historical records imply that the three lineages of Pak, Seok, and Kim worshipped Bak Hyeokgeose as their founding ancestor.

When Seonggols have died out followed by two consecutive queens, Kim Chun-Chu from Jingol began to monopolize the throne, which lasts 258 years. However, even during this period, the Kims did not fully occupy the throne. In the later period of, Silla, the Pak clan from Jingol succeed in restoring the throne. During the last century of the dynasty, the Pak clan from Jingol regained the ruling house position in 728 years. However, the Pak dynasty was cut off when Gyeongae of Silla was forced to commit suicide by King Kyŏn Hwŏn of Later Baekje. The reign of the Pak clan lasted only 15 years. After that, Kim Bu became the last king of, Silla, but soon surrendered to the Wang Geon of Goryeo and Silla finally collapsed in 992 years.

During the Unified Silla the Miryang Pak Clan, along with Gimhae Kim clan became the most prominent of the aristocracy, based on the bone rank system. Within the bone rank system, the two clans of Gimhae Kims and Miryang Paks were considered the most Jingol, or "True Bone". As Seonggol, or, Divine bones died out through intermarriage, these two clans became the dominant noble houses on the peninsula following the conquest of rival dynasties.

After the fall of Silla, it continued as a major noble house of Goryeo. During the Goryeo dynasty, many of the people who passed the highest-level state examination, which was implemented to recruit ranking officials during the Goryeo dynasty, were Parks. The first General to defeat the Mongols in world history was General Park Seo, who commanded the successful defense of the fortress of Guju in 1231 against the forces led by Mongol General Salitai.

During Joseon period, Parks continued to thrive as one of the main Yangban households. With the Gabo Reform of 1894, when the caste system was abolished, some peasants adopted the surname of Park, bloating the population of the Park family. Simultaneously with the abolition of the Gwageo national service examination, the Yangban system came to an end. During the Japanese, Occupation, Period, three of the ten Korean aristocrats admitted into Japanese House of Peers were of the Park Clan.

According to Kojiki, Nihon Shoki and Harima no Kuni Fudoki, one of Pak Princes, recorded in various names as Amenohiboko (天日槍), Amenohihoko (天之日矛), Hiboko (日桙), Amenohibokonomikoto (天日槍命), Amenohibokonomikoto (天日桙命) and Amanohiboko (海檜槍) migrated to Japan in 27 BC and Itoi clan (糸井氏), Miyake clan, Tachibana clan (橘守氏), Tajima clan (但馬氏), Itoi clan (絲井氏) and Tajimamori are recorded as descendants of Amenohiboko.

== Notable people of the past ==
The following is a list of notable people of the past with the Korean family name Park.

=== Kings ===
- King Hyeokgeose of Silla (57 BC–4 AD)
- King Namhae of Silla (4–24)
- King Yuri of Silla (24–57)
- King Pasa of Silla (80–112)
- King Jima of Silla (112–134)
- King Ilseong of Silla (134–154)
- King Adalla of Silla (154–184)
- King Sindeok of Silla (912–917)
- King Gyeongmyeong of Silla (917–924)
- King Gyeongae of Silla (924–927)

=== Historical people ===
- Pak An-sin (1369–1447), scholar-official of the Joseon Dynasty
- Pak Kyusu (1807–1877), scholar-bureaucrat, teacher, politician, and diplomat of the Joseon Dynasty
- Pak Chiwŏn (philosopher) (1737–1805), philosopher and novelist in the late Joseon dynasty
- Bak Jungyang (1872–1959), Korean bureaucrat and politician in Japanese-ruled Korea
- Pak Sŏ-saeng, civil minister, diplomat and ambassador in the early Joseon Dynasty period
- Pak Yŏn (1378–1458), government official, scholar, astronomer and musician in the early Joseon period
- Pak Yŏng-gyu (?-970), Silla general and one of the warlords in the Later Three Kingdoms period
- Pak Chega (1750–1805), scholar of Silhak in the late Joseon Dynasty
- Pak P'aengnyŏn (1417–1456), scholar-official of the Joseon Dynasty
- Park Mun-su (1691–1756), government official in the Joseon dynasty
- Park Seo-yang (1885–1940), Korean early modern surgeon, doctor, chemist, and independence activist
- Pak Yŏn (born Jan Jansz Weltevree) (1595–?), Dutch sailor and government official during the Joseon Dynasty

== Notable people of recent times ==
=== Actors ===
- Park Ah-sung (born 1994), South Korean actor
- Park Bo-gum (born 1993), South Korean actor
- Park Byung-eun (born 1977), South Korean actor
- Park Chul-min (born 1967), South Korean actor
- Park Eun-seok (born 1984), South Korean actor
- Park Geun-hyung (born 1940), South Korean actor
- Park Gun-woo (actor) (born 1996), South Korean actor
- Park Hae-il (born 1977), South Korean actor
- Park Hae-jin (born 1983), South Korean actor
- Park Hae-joon (born 1976), South Korean actor
- Park Hae-soo (born 1981), South Korean actor
- Park Hee-soon (born 1970), South Korean actor
- Park Ho-san (born 1972), South Korean actor
- Park Hoon (born 1981), South Korean actor
- Park Hyuk-kwon (born 1971), South Korean actor
- Park Hyung-sik (born 1991), South Korean actor and singer
- Park Hyung-soo (born 1980), South Korean actor
- Park In-hwan (actor) (born 1945), South Korean actor
- Park Jae-jung (born 1980), South Korean actor
- Park Jeong-min (actor) (born 1987), South Korean actor, writer, book publisher
- Park Ji-bin (born 1995), South Korean actor
- Park Ji-hwan (born 1980), South Korean actor
- Park Jong-hwan (actor) (born 1982), South Korean actor
- Park Joong-hoon (born 1966), South Korean actor
- Park Jun-gyu (born 1964), South Korean actor
- Park Jung-woo (actor) (born 1996), South Korean actor
- Park Ki-woong (born 1985), South Korean actor
- Park Min-woo (actor) (born 1988), South Korean actor
- Park Myung-hoon (born 1975), South Korean actor
- Park No-sik (1930–1995), South Korean actor
- Randall Park (born 1974), American actor and filmmaker
- Park Sang-min (actor) (born 1970), South Korean actor
- Park Sang-nam (born 1994), South Korean actor
- Park Sang-won (born 1959), South Korean actor
- Park Sang-wook (actor) (born 1976), South Korean actor
- Park Seo-ham (born 1993), South Korean actor and former singer
- Park Seo-joon (born 1988), South Korean actor
- Park Shin-yang (born 1968), South Korean actor
- Park Si-hoo (born 1978), South Korean actor
- Park Solomon (born 1999), Uzbekistan-born South Korean actor
- Steve Park (comedian) (born 1951), American actor and comedian
- Park Sung-hoon (born 1985), South Korean actor
- Park Sung-woo (actor) (born 1988), South Korean actor and model
- Park Sung-woong (born 1973), South Korean actor
- Park Won-sang (born 1970), South Korean actor
- Park Yeong-gyu (born 1953), South Korean actor
- Park Yong-ha (1977–2010), South Korean actor and singer
- Park Yong-woo (born 1971), South Korean actor
- Park Yoo-chun (born 1986), Korean-American actor and singer-songwriter
- Park Yoon-ho (born 2003), South Korean actor
- Park Yoon-jae (born 1981), South Korean actor
- Park Young-woon (born 1990), South Korean actor
- Park Yu-hwan (born 1991), South Korean actor

=== Actresses ===
- Park Ah-in (born 1985), South Korean actress
- Ashley Park (actress) (born 1991), American actress and musician
- Park Bo-kyung (born 1981), South Korean actress
- Park Bo-young (born 1990), South Korean actress
- Park Chae-rim (born 1979), South Korean actress
- Park Eun-bin (born 1992), South Korean actress
- Park Eun-hye (born 1977), South Korean actress
- Grace Park (actress) (born 1974), American-Canadian actress and model
- Park Gyeong-ree (born 1990), South Korean actress and singer
- Park Gyu-young (born 1993), South Korean actress
- Park Ha-na (born 1985), South Korean actress
- Park Ha-sun (born 1987), South Korean actress
- Park Hae-mi (born 1964), South Korean actress
- Park Han-byul (born 1984), South Korean actress and model
- Park Han-sol (born 1995), South Korean actress
- Park Hee-jin (actress) (born 1973), South Korean actress, model, comedian, singer
- Park Hee-jung (actress) (born 1991), South Korean actress and model
- Park Hee-von (born 1983), South Korean actress and singer
- Hettienne Park (born 1983), American actress and writer
- Park Hwan-hee (born 1990), South Korean actress and model
- Park Hye-su (born 1994), South Korean actress and singer
- Park Hyo-joo (born 1982), South Korean actress
- Park In-young (born 1982), South Korean actress and singer
- Park Jeong-ja (actress) (born 1942), South Korean actress
- Park Ji-ah (actress, born 1972) (1972–2024), South Korean actress
- Park Ji-ah (actress, born 1977), South Korean actress
- Park Ji-hu (born 2003), South Korean actress
- Park Ji-hyun (actress) (born 1994), South Korean actress and model
- Park Ji-soo (actress) (born 1988), South Korean actress
- Park Ji-ye (born 1995), South Korean actress
- Park Ji-yeon (actress, born 1988), South Korean actress
- Park Ji-young (actress) (born 1969), South Korean actress
- Park Jin-hee (born 1978), South Korean actress
- Park Jin-joo (born 1988), South Korean actress
- Park Joo-hee (born 1987), South Korean actress
- Park Joo-mi (born 1972), South Korean actress
- Park Joon-geum (born 1962), South Korean actress
- Park Ju-hyun (born 1994), South Korean actress
- Park Jung-ah (born 1981), South Korean actress, singer, entertainer
- Park Jung-soo (actress) (born 1952), South Korean actress
- Park Jung-yeon (born 1997), South Korean actress and model
- Park Kyung-hye (born 1993), South Korean actress
- Linda Park (born 1978), South Korean-born American actress
- Park Min-ha (actress) (born 2007), South Korean actress
- Park Min-ji (born 1989), South Korean actress
- Park Min-jung (born 1982), South Korean actress
- Park Min-young (born 1986), South Korean actress
- Park Ri-won (born 1998), South Korean actress
- Romi Park (born 1972), Japanese actress and singer
- Park Se-wan (born 1994), South Korean actress
- Park Se-young (born 1988), South Korean actress
- Park Seo-kyung (born 2009), South Korean actress
- Park Seo-yeon (born 2002), South Korean actress
- Park Shin-hye (born 1990), South Korean actress
- Park Si-eun (actress) (born 1980), South Korean actress
- Park Si-yeon (born 1979), South Korean actress and beauty pageant titleholder
- Park So-dam (born 1991), South Korean actress
- Park So-hyun (born 1971), South Korean actress
- Park So-yi (born 2012), South Korean actress
- Park Sol-mi (born 1978), South Korean actress
- Park Soo Ae (born 1979), South Korean actress
- Park Soo-jin (born 1985), South Korean actress, singer, model
- Park Sun-young (actress) (born 1976), South Korean actress
- Park Sung-yeon (born 1975), South Korean actress
- Sydney Park (actress) (born 1997), American actress and comedian
- Park Won-sook (born 1949), South Korean actress
- Park Ye-jin (born 1981), South Korean actress
- Park Ye-young (born 1989), South Korean actress
- Park You-na (born 1997), South Korean actress
- Park Yu-rim (born 1993), South Korean actress and model

=== Athletes ===
- Angela Park (born 1988), Brazilian-American professional golfer
- Park Byung-geon (born 1982), South Korean footballer
- Chan Ho Park (born 1973), South Korean baseball player
- Piao Cheng (born 1989), Korean-Chinese football player
- Park Chu-young (born 1985), South Korean footballer
- Park Dong-keun (born c. 1941), South Korean Grandmaster of taekwondo
- Park Hang-seo (born 1957), South Korean football manager
- Hoy Park (born 1996), South Korean baseball player
- Park Hyun-bin (born 2003), South Korean footballer
- Inbee Park (born 1988), South Korean professional golfer
- Jane Park (born 1986), American professional golfer
- Park Ji-Sung (born 1981), South Korean footballer
- Park Jong-il (born 1972), South Korean ski mountaineer
- Park Jong-soo (1941–2021), South Korean master of taekwondo
- Park Joo Bong (born 1964), South Korean badminton player
- Park Joo-ho (born 1987), South Korean footballer
- Marvin Park (born 2000), Spanish footballer
- Park Sang-young (born 1995), South Korean épée fencer
- Pak Se-ri (born 1977), South Korean golfer
- Park Seong-hoon, South Korean footballer
- Park Seung-hi (born 1992), South Korean short track speed skater
- Piao Shihao (born 1991), Korean-Chinese football player
- Park Sung-hyun (golfer) (born 1993), South Korean golfer
- Park Sung-soo (1970–2025), South Korean archer and Olympic champion
- Park Tae-Hwan (born 1989), South Korean swimmer

=== Comedians ===
- Park Kyung-lim (1979), South Korean entertainer

=== Directors ===
- Annabel Park (born 1968), Korean American documentary filmmaker and activist
- Park Chan-wook (born 1963), South Korean director
- Park Hee-gon (1969–2025), South Korean film director and screenwriter
- Park Kwang-su (born 1955), South Korean filmmaker
- Park Nam-ok (1923–2017), South Korean director
- Sunghoo Park, South Korean anime director

=== Literary figures ===
- Park Chong-hwa (1901–1981), Korean poet and novelist
- Park Hyoung-su (born 1972), South Korean writer
- Park In-hwan (author) (1926–1956), Korean poet and author
- Pak Jaesam (1933–1997), South Korean poet
- Linda Sue Park (born 1960), Korean-American author
- Park Nam-su (1918–1994), South Korean poet
- Park Seolyeon (born 1989), South Korean writer
- Park Taesun (1942–2019), South Korean writer
- Park Taewon (1909–1986), South Korean writer
- Park Wan-suh (1931–2011), South Korean writer
- Park Yeonghan (1947–2006), South Korean writer
- Park Yong-rae (1925–1980), South Korean poet
- Park Ynhui (1930–2017), South Korean poet and writer

=== Politicians ===
- Park Chung Hee (1917–1979), South Korean politician
- Park Geun-hye (born 1952), South Korean politician
- Park Jie-won (born 1942), South Korean politician
- Jihyun Park (born 1968), British-North Korean politician
- Pak Song-chol (1913–2008), North Korean politician
- Park Won-soon (1956–2020), South Korean politician, activist and lawyer

=== Singers ===
- Park Bom (born 1984), South Korean singer
- Park Bo-ram (1994–2024), South Korean singer
- Anderson .Paak (born Brandon Paak Anderson, 1986), American musician
- Chanyeol (born Park Chan-yeol, 1992), South Korean rapper, member of boy band Exo
- Jun Jin (born Park Choong-jae, 1980), South Korean singer, member of boy band Shinhwa
- Park Cho-a (born 1990), South Korean singer
- Park Cho-rong (born 1991), South Korean singer, member of South Korean girl group Apink
- Ivy (born Park Eun-hye, 1982), South Korean singer
- Michelle Steel (born Park Eun-joo, born 1955), South Korean-born American politician
- Park Gil-ra (1965–1986), South Korean singer
- Park Gyu-ri (born 1988), South Korean singer, member of girl group Kara
- Hwayobi (born Park Hwayobi, 1982), South Korean R&B singer-songwriter
- Hynn (born Park Hye-won, 1998), South Korean singer-songwriter
- Narsha (born Park Hyo-jin, 1981), South Korean singer, member of girl group Brown Eyed Girls
- Park Hyo-shin (born 1981), South Korean singer and musical theater actor
- Park Hyang-rim (1921–1946), South Korean singer
- Jay Park (born Park Jae-beom, 1987), American rapper
- Park Jae-chan (born 2001), South Korean singer, member of boy band DKZ
- Jae Park (born Park Jae-hyung, 1992), Argentine-born American musician
- Psy (born Park Jae-sang, 1977), South Korean singer and producer
- Park Jeong-woo (born 2004), South Korean singer, member of boy band Treasure
- Park Ji-hoon (born 1999), South Korean singer and actor
- Jamie (born Park Ji-min, 1997), South Korean singer
- Jimin (born Park Ji-min, 1995), South Korean singer and dancer, member of boy band BTS
- Jinjin (born Park Jin-woo, 1996), South Korean rapper, member of boy band Astro
- Park Jin-young (born 1994), South Korean singer and actor, member of boy band Got7
- J.Y. Park (born 1971), South Korean singer-songwriter and businessman
- Jihyo (born Park Ji-hyo, 1997), South Korean singer, member of girl group Twice
- Jisung (born Park Ji-sung, 2002), South Korean and actor, member of boy band NCT Dream
- Park Ji-yeon (born 1993), South Korean singer and actress, member of girl group T-ara
- Gummy (born Park Ji-yeon, 1981), South Korean singer
- Park Ji-yoon (born 1982), South Korean singer and actress
- Kahi (born Park Ji-young, 1980), South Korean singer
- Joon Park (born Park Joon-hyung, 1969), South Korean-born American singer, member of boy band g.o.d
- Bizzy (born Park Jun-young, 1980), South Korean rapper, member of hip hop trio MFBTY
- Park Jung-ah (born 1981), South Korean singer and actress
- Park Jeong-hwa (born 1995), South Korean singer and actress, member of girl group Exid
- Lena Park (born Park Junghyun, 1976), American-born South Korean singer
- Park Jung-min (singer) (born 1987), South Korean singer, member of boy band SS501
- Leeteuk (born Park Jeong-su, 1983), South Korean singer and actor, member of boy band Super Junior
- Park Kyung (born 1992), South Korean rapper, member of boy band Block B
- Park Gyeong-ree (born 1990), South Korean singer and actress, member of girl group Nine Muses
- Rocky (born Park Min-hyuk, 1999), South Korean rapper, member of boy band Astro
- Meenoi (born Park Min-young, 1997), South Korean singer
- Park Myung-soo (born 1970), South Korean singer and comedian
- Rosé (born Park Chae-young, 1997), Korean-New Zealand singer, member of girl group Blackpink
- Sandara Park (born 1984), South Korean singer and actress
- Thunder (born Park Sang-hyun, 1990), South Korean singer
- Seonghwa (born Park Seong-hwa, 1998), South Korean singer and actor, member of the boy group Ateez
- Park Si-eun (born 2001), South Korean singer and actress, member of girl group STAYC
- Shion (singer) (born Park Yu-hyangn), Japanese-born Korean singer
- Park So-jin (born 1986), South Korean singer and actress, member of girl group Girl's Day
- Park Soo-young (born 1992), South Korean singer and actress
- Joy (born Park Soo-young, 1996), South Korean singer and actress, member of girl group Red Velvet
- Park Subin (born 1994), South Korean singer, member of girl group Dal Shabet
- Sun Park (born 1981), Korean Australian singer and entertainer
- Luna (born Park Sun-young, 1993), South Korean singer and musical actress, member of girl group f(x)
- Sunghoon (born Park Sung-hoon, 2002), South Korean singer, member of boy band Enhypen
- Teddy Park (born Park Hong-jun, 1978), Korean–American rapper and record producer
- Park Woo-jin (born 1999), South Korean singer, member of boy band AB6IX
- Martin (Korean name Park Woo-joo, 2008), Korean-Canadian singer-songwriter, rapper, leader and member of boy band Cortis
- Park Ye-eun (born 1989), South Korean singer
- Park Yoo-chun (born 1986), South Korean-American singer-songwriter and actor
- Zior Park (born 1994), South Korean rapper
- Wooyeon (born Park Jin-kyung, 2003), South Korean singer and actress, member of girl group Wooah
- Serri (born Park Mi-yeon, 1990), South Korean singer, member of girl group Dal Shabet

=== Other ===
- Coyote Park (born 1999), Spanish-born American visual artist, of mixed Korean heritage
- Davidior (born David Park, 1983), American musician
- Pony (make-up artist) (born Park Hye-min, 1990), South Korean make-up artist and YouTuber
- Park Jongwoo (born 1958), South Korean photographer
- Park Junghwan (born 1993), South Korean professional Go player
- Park Kun-bae (born 1948), South Korean former president of the Boy Scouts of Korea
- Sae Eun Park (born 1989), South Korean ballet dancer
- Soo Sunny Park, Korean-American artist
- Suji Park (born 1985), Korean-New Zealand ceramic sculptor and artist
- Park Tae-joon (1927–2011), South Korean businessman
- Yeonmi Park (born 1993), North Korean defector and activist
- Pak Yu-sung (born 1998), North Korean defector and filmmaker
- Youngsook Park (born 1955), South Korean futurist

=== Fictional characters ===
- Adam Park, a character on Mighty Morphin Power Rangers
- Park, a character on Hey Arnold!
- Linda Park, a character in the DC Flash series
- Sun Park, a character on American Dragon: Jake Long
- Glory Park, a character from the novel Every Anxious Wave
- Soojin Park, a character from the novel Amina's Voice
- Chloe Park, a character on We Bare Bears
- Jake Park, a character from the action-horror video game Dead by Daylight
- Willow Park, a character in The Owl House
- Min-Gi Park, a character from Infinity Train

== See also ==
- Korean name
- Silla
- Royal House
