= President Park =

President Park may refer to:

- Park Chung Hee (1917–1979), 3rd president of South Korea
- Park Geun-hye (born 1952), impeached 11th president of South Korea and daughter of the 3rd president

== See also ==
- Park (Korean surname)
