= Sangju Ju clan =

Korean clan from North Gyeongsang Province

Sangju Joo clan
- Country: Korea
- Current region: Sangju
- Founder: Joo Yi
- Connected members: Ju Si-gyeong; Ji Hyun-woo

Sangju Joo clan (Korean: 상주 주씨; Hanja: 尙州 周氏) is one of the Korean clans. Their Bon-gwan was in Sangju, North Gyeongsang Province. According to the research held in 2000, the number of Sangju Joo clan's family was 5631, and the number of Sangju Joo clan was 18147. Their founder was Joo Yi who was naturalized in Silla from Tang dynasty. Neungju Joo clan, Sangju Joo clan, Cheonan Joo clan, Chorwon Joo clan, and Chogye Joo clan was originally the same clan before they divided from Joo Yi, and all of them were naturalized in Silla from Tang dynasty.

== See also ==
- Korean clan names of foreign origin
