= Chogye Joo clan =

Korean clan from South Gyeongsang Province

- Country: Korea
- Current region: Hapcheon County
- Founder: Joo Hwang

Chogye Joo clan (Korean: 초계 주씨; Hanja: 草溪 周氏) is one of the Korean clans. Their Bon-gwan is in Hapcheon County, South Gyeongsang Province. According to the research held in 2000, the number of Chogye Joo clan was 6665. Their founder was Joo Hwang who was a Hanlin Academy in Tang dynasty. He was naturalized in Silla during 11 th year of Hyogong of Silla’s reign. Neungju Joo clan, Sangju Joo clan, Cheonan Joo clan, Chorwon Joo clan, and Chogye Joo clan were all sorted as the same kind of clan which were divided from Joo Yi who was naturalized in Silla from Tang dynasty.

== See also ==
- Korean clan names of foreign origin
