= Sindeok of Silla =

53rd monarch of Silla (r. 912–917)

Sindeok of Silla 신덕왕 神德王
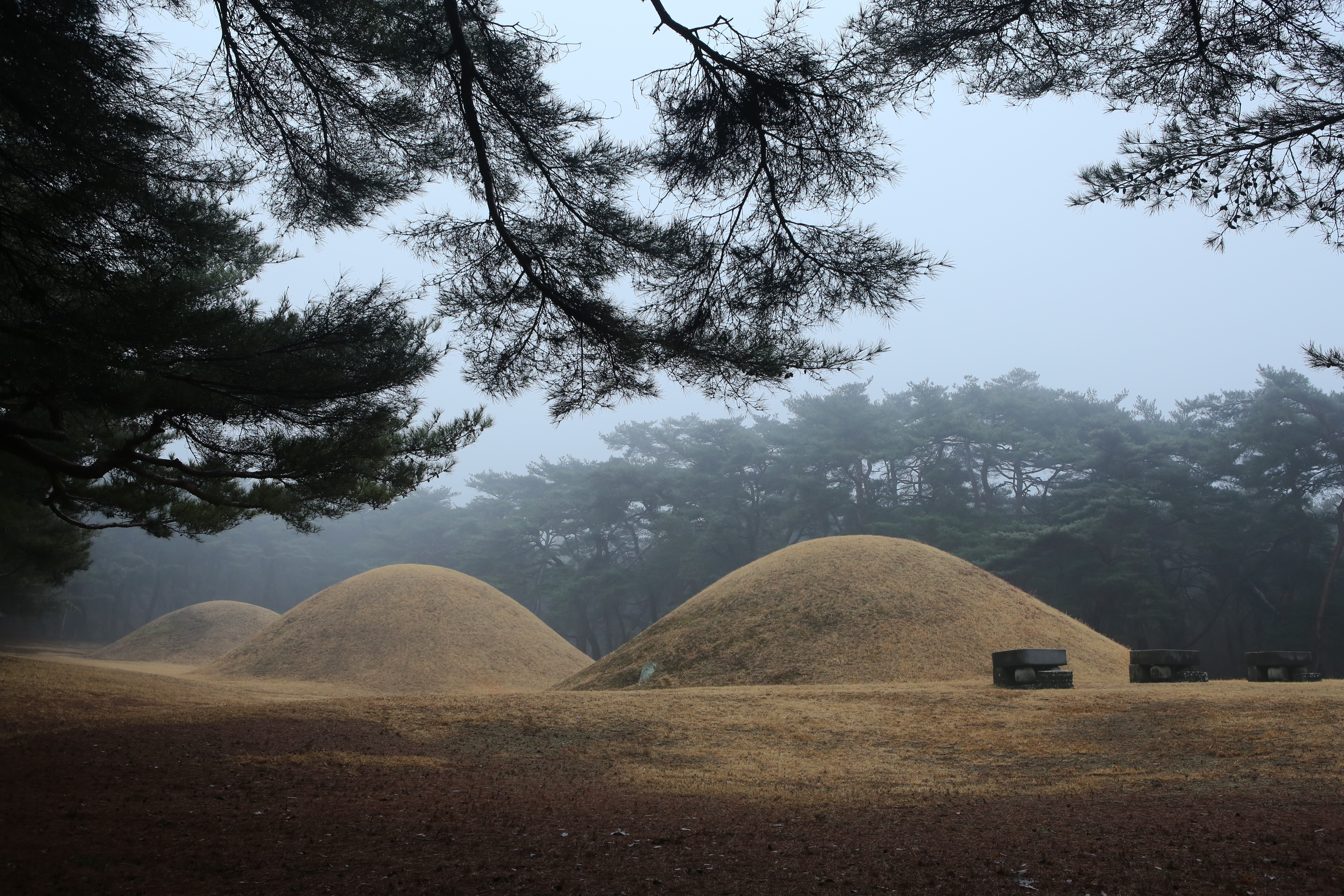
- Tomb of King Sindeok

King of Silla
- Reign: 912-917
- Coronation: 912
- Predecessor: Hyogong of Silla
- Successor: Gyeongmyeong of Silla
- Born: Unknown; Unified Silla
- Died: 917; Unified Silla
- House: Pak
- Father: Pak Ye-gyŏm
- Mother: Madame Jeonghwa
- Religion: Buddhism

- Sindeok of Silla
- Hangul: 박경휘
- Hanja: 朴景暉
- RR: Bak Gyeonghwi
- MR: Pak Kyŏnghwi

Monarch name
- Hangul: 신덕왕
- Hanja: 神德王
- RR: Sindeogwang
- MR: Sindŏgwang

Sindeok (died 917), personal name Pak Kyŏng-hwi, was the 53rd ruler of the Korean kingdom of Silla. He was born to the Pak clan, and was the son of Daeachan Pak Ye-gyŏm. He was chosen to succeed the childless King Hyogong, because he was a descendant of King Adalla (d. 184, the last Pak to sit on the Silla throne) and was also a son-in-law of King Heongang.

Reigning during the Later Three Kingdoms period, Sindeok was faced with constant attacks by the new kingdoms of Taebong and Later Baekje in the west.

Upon his death in 917, King Sindeok was buried near Juk Castle in Gyeongju.

== Family ==
Parents

- Father: Pak Ye-gyŏm (박예겸)
- Mother: Madame Jeonghwa (정화부인)

Consorts and their respective issue:

- Queen Uiseong of the Kim clan (의성왕후 김씨), daughter of Heongang of Silla
  - Son: Gyeongmyeong of Silla–was the 54th ruler of Silla
  - Son: Gyeongae of Silla–was the 55th ruler of Silla

In Samguk yusa recorded that Pak Ye-gyŏm was his adoptive father and Pak Mun-wŏn (박문원) was King Sindeok's biological father.

== In popular culture ==
- Portrayed by Kim Geon-Ho in the 2000–2002 KBS1 TV series Taejo Wang Geon

== See also ==
- List of Korean monarchs
- List of Silla people
- Later Three Kingdoms of Korea

Sindeok of Silla House of Park Died: 917
Regnal titles
| Preceded by Hyogong | King of Silla; Silla; 912–917 | Succeeded by Gyeongmyeong |
