= Sangju National University =

1921–2008 university in Sangju, South Korea

Coordinates: 36.378°N 128.146°E

- Motto: 성실, 창의, 봉사 "Sincerity, Creativity, Service"
- Type: National
- Established: April 25, 1921
- President: Kim Jong-ho
- Academic staff: 104 (2001)
- Students: 4,350
- Location: Sangju, North Gyeongsang, South Korea
- Campus: Suburban
- Website: www.knu.ac.kr

- Sangju National University
- Hangul: 국립상주대학교
- Hanja: 國立尙州大學校
- RR: Gungnip Sangju daehakgyo
- MR: Kungnip Sangju taehakkyo

Sangju National University was a public university in Gajang-dong, in the city of Sangju, North Gyeongsang province. In 2008 it merged with Kyungpook National University, becoming its Sangju Campus. It has an enrollment of about 4,350 students, and employs about 105 professors. The university places a heavy emphasis on agricultural studies. It is home to a graduate school, library, museum, and various technical research institutes.

Sangju National University opened on April 25, 1921, as Sangju Public School for Agriculture and Sericulture (상주공립농잠학교). The name changed at various times thereafter, but the school did not gain college status until much later. It was redesignated as Sangju Technical College in 1982, and became a university in 1999.

The school's current president is Kim Jong-ho. The school carries out "sister school" relationships with Ball State University in the United States, and Benguet State University in the Philippines.

== See also ==
- Education in South Korea
