= Namsan (Sangju) =

Hill in Sangju, North Korea

- Hangul: 남산
- Hanja: 南山
- RR: Namsan
- MR: Namsan

Namsan (Korean: 남산; lit. South Mountain) is an 821-meter peak in Sangju, South Korea.
