= 2021 Bury Metropolitan Borough Council election =

2021 local election in England

Map showing the results of the 2021 Bury Metropolitan Borough Council election

The 2021 Bury Metropolitan Borough Council election took place on 6 May 2021 to elect members of Bury Metropolitan Borough Council in England. This was on the same day as other local elections. One-third of the seats were up for election, with a total of 69 candidates standing.

== Results summary ==
Bury Metropolitan Borough Council election, 2021
Party	Seats	Gains	Losses	Net gain/loss	Seats %	Votes %	Votes	+/−
Labour	27	3	4	▼1	52.9	41.7	27,051	▲2.8
Conservative	15	2	3	▼1	29.4	41.1	26,686	▲6.3
Liberal Democrats	4	0	0	Steady	7.8	8.1	5,284	▼4.6
Radcliffe First	4	2	0	▲2	7.8	5.5	3,585	New
Green	0	0	0	Steady	0.0	3.0	1,956	▼5.7
Independent	1	0	0	Steady	2.0	0.3	173	▼3.4
English Democrat	0	0	0	Steady	0.0	0.2	139	▼0.4
Freedom Alliance	0	0	0	Steady	0.0	0.1	35	New

== Ward results ==
=== Besses ===
Besses
Party	Candidate	Votes	%	±%
Labour	Lucy Smith	1,596	58.06	▼0.62
Conservative	Philip Wharmby	775	28.19	▲8.19
Green	Cameron Fay	157	5.71	▲0.28
English Democrat	Stephen Morris	139	5.06	▼6.46
Liberal Democrats	Mike Williams	82	2.98	▼1.38
Majority		821	29.87	▼8.81
Turnout		2,749	33.6	
Labour hold		Swing		

=== Church ===
Church
Party	Candidate	Votes	%	±%
Conservative	Jordan Lewis	2,311	60.59	▲0.82
Labour	Josh Simons	1,141	29.92	▼2.04
Green	Michelle Sampson	239	6.27	▲0.82
Liberal Democrats	Lynda Arthur	123	3.22	▲0.41
Majority		1,170	30.68	▲2.87
Turnout		3,814	45.9	
Conservative hold		Swing		

=== East ===
East
Party	Candidate	Votes	%	±%
Labour	Ummrana Farooq	1,490	53.83	▼9.62
Conservative	Shaf Mahmood	915	33.06	▲8.10
Liberal Democrats	Stephen Lewis	363	13.11	N/A
Majority		575	20.77	▼17.72
Turnout		2,768	32.2	
Labour hold		Swing		

=== Elton ===
Elton
Party	Candidate	Votes	%	±%
Conservative	Jack Rydeheard	1,949	52.65	
Labour Co-op	Susan Southworth	1,564	42.25	
Liberal Democrats	Bryan Simpson	189	5.11	
Majority		385	10.40	
Turnout		3,702	42.7	
Conservative gain from Labour Co-op		Swing		

=== Holyrood ===
Holyrood
Party	Candidate	Votes	%	±%
Liberal Democrats	Steven Wright	1,688	44.40	
Labour	Noel Bayley	1,503	39.53	
Conservative	Christopher Baron	515	13.55	
Green	Peter Curati	96	2.52	
Majority		185	4.87	
Turnout		3,802	43.9	
Liberal Democrats hold		Swing		

=== Moorside ===
Moorside (2 seats)
Party	Candidate	Votes	%	±%
Labour	Ciaron Boles	1,655	52.0	
Labour	Kevin Peel	1,434	45.1	
Conservative	Jihyun Park	984	30.9	
Conservative	Sohail Raja	853	26.8	
Green	Charlie Allen	282	8.9	
Independent	Victor Hagan	173	5.4	
Liberal Democrats	David Foss	132	4.1	
Turnout		3,181	35.9	
Labour hold		Swing		
Labour gain from Independent		Swing		

=== North Manor ===
North Manor (2 seats)
Party	Candidate	Votes	%	±%
Conservative	Roger Brown	2,421	57.2	
Conservative	Liam Dean	2,194	51.9	
Labour	Helen Clarke	1,345	31.8	
Labour	Euan Saunders	1,048	24.8	
Green	Mary Christine	491	11.6	
Liberal Democrats	Ewan Arthur	310	7.3	
Turnout		4,229	52.1	
Conservative hold		Swing		
Conservative hold		Swing		

=== Pilkington Park ===
Pilkington Park
Party	Candidate	Votes	%	±%
Conservative	Russell Bernstein	1,827	55.40	
Labour	Ayesha Arif	1,180	35.78	
Green	Glyn Heath	195	5.91	
Liberal Democrats	Jaroslaw Lytwyn	96	2.91	
Majority		647	19.62	
Turnout		3,298	43.6	
Conservative hold		Swing		

=== Radcliffe East ===
Radcliffe East
Party	Candidate	Votes	%	±%
Radcliffe First	Carol Birchmore	1,551	47.68	
Labour	Rhyse Cathcart	1,074	33.02	
Conservative	Raymond Solomon	542	16.66	
Liberal Democrats	Rodney Rew	86	2.64	
Majority		477	14.66	
Turnout		3,253	35.3	
Radcliffe First gain from Labour				

=== Radcliffe North ===
Radcliffe North
Party	Candidate	Votes	%	±%
Conservative	Jo Lancaster	1,725	50.34	▲18.16
Radcliffe First	Glyn Marsden	900	26.26	N/A
Labour	Babar Ibrahim	704	20.54	▼26.31
Liberal Democrats	Kingsley Jones	98	2.86	N/A
Majority		825	24.07	
Turnout		3,427	39.6	
Conservative gain from Labour		Swing		

=== Radcliffe West ===
Radcliffe West
Party	Candidate	Votes	%	±%
Radcliffe First	Gareth Staples-Jones	1,134	42.7	
Labour	Spencer Donnelley	974	36.6	
Conservative	David Lewis	504	19.0	
Liberal Democrats	Sarah Thorpe	46	1.7	
Majority		160	6.1	
Turnout		2,658	31.4	
Radcliffe First gain from Labour				

=== Ramsbottom ===
Ramsbottom
Party	Candidate	Votes	%	±%
Labour	Tom Pilkington	2,118	50.5	
Conservative	Ian Schofield	1,960	46.7	
Liberal Democrats	Jacob Royde	117	2.8	
Majority		158	3.8	N/A
Turnout		4,195	46.6	
Labour gain from Conservative		Swing		

=== Redvales ===
Redvales
Party	Candidate	Votes	%	±%
Labour	Shaheena Haroon	1,664	45.8	
Conservative	Shahbaz Arif	1,491	41.0	
Green	Paul Johnstone	296	8.1	
Liberal Democrats	Andrew Entwistle	183	5.0	
Majority		173	4.8	
Turnout		3,634	39.1	
Labour hold		Swing		

=== Sedgley ===
Sedgley
Party	Candidate	Votes	%	±%
Labour	Debbie Quinn	2,074	57.1	
Conservative	Carol Bernstein	1,400	38.5	
Liberal Democrats	Ugonna Edeoga	159	4.4	
Majority		674	18.6	N/A
Turnout		3,633	40.9	
Labour gain from Conservative		Swing		

=== St Marys ===
St Marys
Party	Candidate	Votes	%	±%
Labour	Sam Butler	1,744	48.2	
Liberal Democrats	Gareth Lloyd-Johnson	1,400	38.7	
Conservative	Antonello Riu	476	13.1	
Majority		344	9.5	
Turnout		3,650	43.7	
Labour hold		Swing		

=== Tottington ===
Tottington
Party	Candidate	Votes	%	±%
Conservative	Luis McBriar	2,294	64.0	
Labour	William Sellers	949	26.5	
Green	Angela Graham	200	5.6	
Liberal Democrats	Sandra Lloyd-Johnson	109	3.0	
Freedom Alliance	Michael Foran	35	1.0	
Majority		1,345	39.5	
Turnout		3,587	45.0	
Conservative hold		Swing		

=== Unsworth ===
Unsworth
Party	Candidate	Votes	%	±%
Labour	Nathan Boroda	1,794	52.05	▲4.00
Conservative	Anton Slawycz	1,550	44.97	▲13.82
Liberal Democrats	Michael Hankey	103	2.99	▼1.02
Majority		244	7.08	▼9.82
Turnout		3,447	47.4	
Labour hold		Swing		
