= Later Sabeol =

919–927 state in Korea

Later Sabeol 後沙伐 후사벌
- 919–927
- Capital: Sabeol
- Common languages: Korean
- Religion: Korean Buddhism, Korean Confucianism, Korean Taoism, Korean shamanism
- Government: Monarchy
- King
  - 919 - 927: Park Eonchang (朴彦昌 / 박언창)
- History
  - Establishment: 919
  - Fall: 927
Preceded by	Succeeded by
Silla	Hubaekje

Korean name
- Hangul: 후사벌
- Hanja: 後沙伐
- RR: Husabeol
- MR: Husabŏl

Husabeol or Later Sabeol (Korean: 후사벌; Hanja: 後沙伐) was a short-lived state during the Later Three Kingdoms of Korea, even though it is not included among the three. It was officially founded by the Silla prince Pak Ŏn-ch'ang (朴彦昌 / 박언창; son of Gyeongmyeong of Silla) in 919, and fell to Kyŏn Hwŏn's Hubaekje army in 927. Its capital was at Sangju, in present-day North Gyeongsang province.

== Background ==
At the end of the Silla Dynasty, the area around Sabeol became an area for struggle between Silla and Later Baekje. King Gyeongmyeong of Silla appointed his son Eonchang as the commander of the Sillan forces around Sabeol, and the prince strengthened his military to fight against the Later Baekje army. However, the national power of Silla rapidly weakened and the surrounding regions around Sabeol fell and made it isolated. Eonchang established the independent state of Sabeol in 918 AD and fought against Later Baekje for nearly ten years.

== Fall ==
After a decade of resistance, the armies of Later Baekje crossed the Nakdong River and made a surprise attack in 929 AD, and due to overwhelming odds, Eonchang was defeated.

== See also ==
- History of Korea
