= Sangju =

City in North Gyeongsang, South Korea

- Municipal City
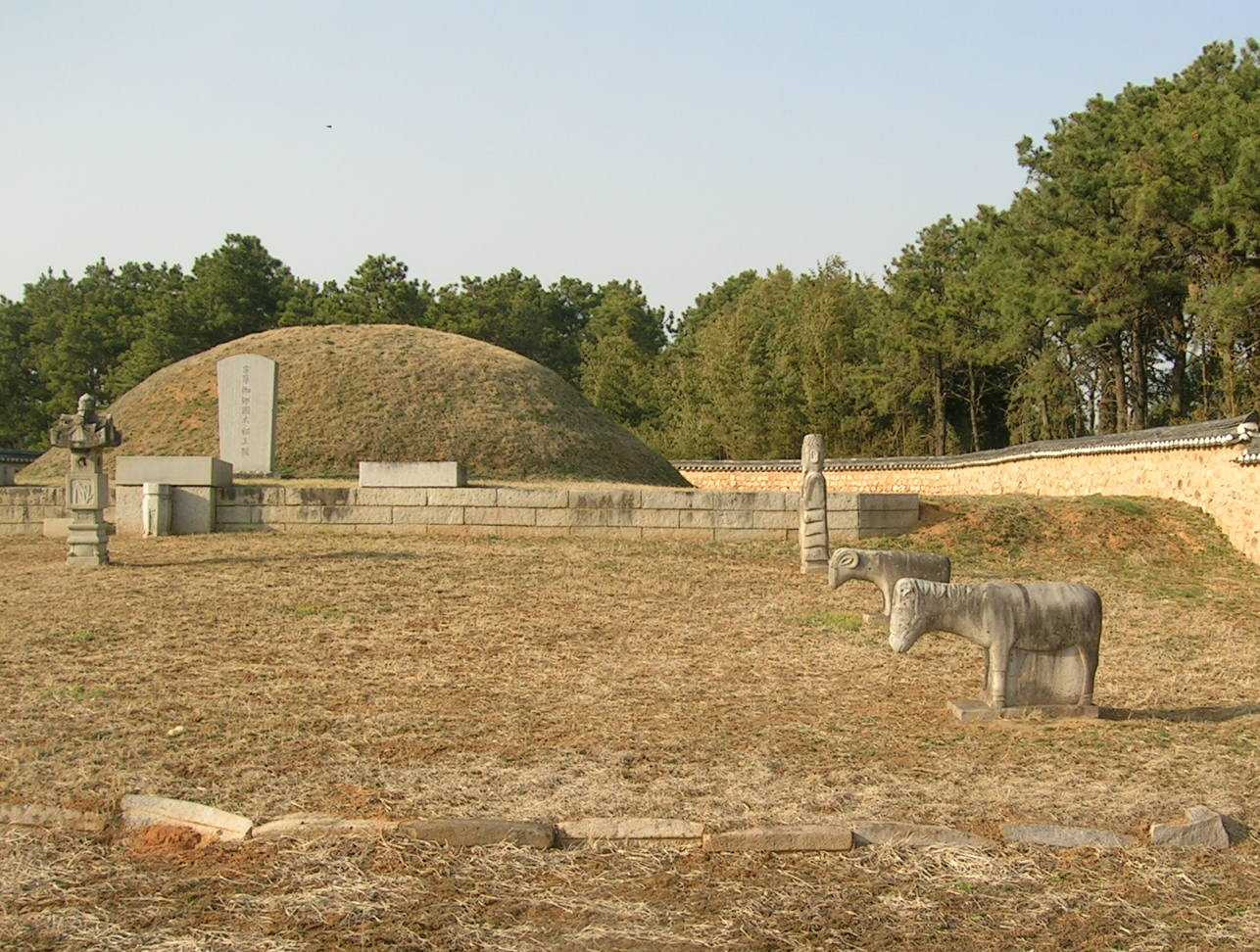

- Flag Emblem of Sangju

- Location in South Korea
- Country: South Korea
- Region: Yeongnam
- Administrative divisions: 1 eup, 17 myeon, 6 dong

Area
  - Total: 1,254.82 km^{2} (484.49 sq mi)

Population (September 2024)
  - Total: 92,452
  - Density: 73.677/km^{2} (190.82/sq mi)
  - Dialect: Gyeongsang
- Flower: Rose
- Tree: Diospyros kaki
- Bird: Eurasian magpie

Korean name
- Hangul: 상주시
- Hanja: 尙州市
- RR: Sangju-si
- MR: Sangju-si

Sangju (Korean: 상주; Korean pronunciation: [sʰaŋ.dʑu]) is a city in North Gyeongsang Province, South Korea. Although Sangju is rather rural, it is very old and was once a key city. Along with Gyeongju, it gives rise to half of the name of the Gyeongsang Provinces. Sangju is nicknamed Sam Baek, or "Three Whites", referring to three prominent agricultural products rice, silkworm cocoons, and dried persimmons from the area.

== Geography and climate ==
=== Geography ===
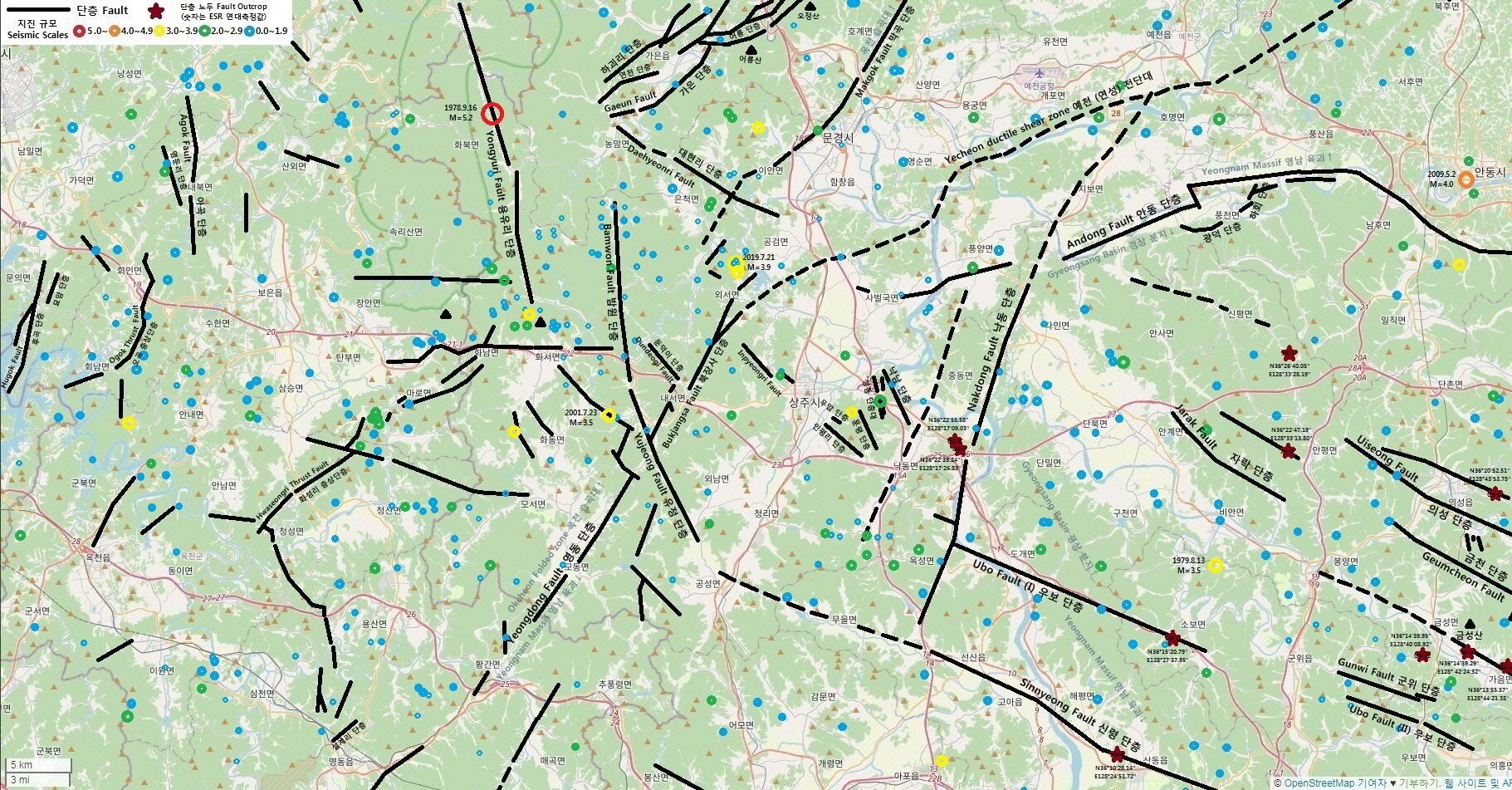
The earthquake and Geology of Sangju and surroundings, using OpenStreetMap

Sangju lies on the northwestern border of North Gyeongsang province, touching on North Chungcheong Province. Thus, to its west and north it adjoins the North Chungcheong counties of Boeun, Goesan, Okcheon, and Yeongdong. Within North Gyeongsang province, it touches Mungyeong on the north, Yecheon, Uiseong, and Gumi on the east, and Gimcheon to the south.

The north and west extremes of the city are found in Hwabuk-myeon, at 127°47′55″E and 36°14′6″N, respectively. The southern limit lies in Gongseong-myeon at 36°14′06″N, on the border with Gimcheon. The eastern edge of Sangju is found in Jungdong-myeon at 128°20′28″E. The city thus spans a total distance of about 49 km (30 mi) from north to south, and about 43.3 km (26.9 mi) from east to west.

All of Sangju lies in the valley of the Nakdong River. Various tributaries flow into the Nakdong in Sangju, including the Yeong (which rises in Mungyeong). The land slopes down from the Sobaek Mountains in the east to the river basin. The highest elevation in Sangju is found at the top of Songnisan, 1,058 m above sea level. Like most of South Korea, the terrain is generally hilly, with only a few flat areas along the rivers. Because of this rugged terrain, 67% of the land in Sangju is classified as "vacant," unused for agricultural or other purposes.

Namsan mountain is located in the city.

=== Climate ===
Sangju has a humid continental climate (Köppen: Dwa), but can be considered a borderline humid subtropical climate (Köppen: Cwa) using the −3 °C (27 °F) isotherm. The average annual temperature is between 12 °C (54 °F) and 13 °C (55 °F), fluctuating from an August average of 26 °C (79 °F) to a chilly January mean of −3 °C (27 °F). The temperature in the mountainous northwest is normally substantially lower. The mean annual rainfall is 1,050 mm (41.3 in)

Climate data for Sangju (2002–2020 normals, extremes 2002–present)
Month	Jan	Feb	Mar	Apr	May	Jun	Jul	Aug	Sep	Oct	Nov	Dec	Year
Record high °C (°F)	14.0 (57.2)	24.0 (75.2)	27.5 (81.5)	32.3 (90.1)	35.8 (96.4)	36.6 (97.9)	38.0 (100.4)	38.5 (101.3)	34.8 (94.6)	29.5 (85.1)	27.5 (81.5)	17.4 (63.3)	38.5 (101.3)
Mean daily maximum °C (°F)	3.9 (39.0)	7.1 (44.8)	13.2 (55.8)	19.6 (67.3)	25.3 (77.5)	28.5 (83.3)	29.5 (85.1)	30.4 (86.7)	25.9 (78.6)	20.8 (69.4)	13.1 (55.6)	5.4 (41.7)	18.6 (65.5)
Daily mean °C (°F)	−0.9 (30.4)	1.4 (34.5)	6.8 (44.2)	12.9 (55.2)	18.6 (65.5)	22.5 (72.5)	24.9 (76.8)	25.3 (77.5)	20.1 (68.2)	13.8 (56.8)	7.2 (45.0)	0.4 (32.7)	12.8 (55.0)
Mean daily minimum °C (°F)	−5.2 (22.6)	−3.5 (25.7)	1.0 (33.8)	6.5 (43.7)	12.4 (54.3)	17.4 (63.3)	21.3 (70.3)	21.6 (70.9)	15.8 (60.4)	8.3 (46.9)	2.1 (35.8)	−3.9 (25.0)	7.8 (46.0)
Record low °C (°F)	−16.3 (2.7)	−15.7 (3.7)	−7.9 (17.8)	−3.0 (26.6)	3.6 (38.5)	6.4 (43.5)	15.2 (59.4)	13.3 (55.9)	7.1 (44.8)	−3.8 (25.2)	−7.2 (19.0)	−13.8 (7.2)	−16.3 (2.7)
Average precipitation mm (inches)	21.7 (0.85)	33.3 (1.31)	46.9 (1.85)	86.6 (3.41)	87.6 (3.45)	115.2 (4.54)	279.3 (11.00)	253.9 (10.00)	138.5 (5.45)	57.1 (2.25)	35.2 (1.39)	23.3 (0.92)	1,178.6 (46.40)
Average precipitation days (≥ 0.1 mm)	5.7	5.9	8.2	8.8	8.5	9.4	16.8	14.5	10.3	6.0	7.4	6.8	108.3
Average relative humidity (%)	56.2	54.0	52.4	53.0	59.1	67.7	80.0	79.4	79.2	71.9	65.2	59.7	64.8
Mean monthly sunshine hours	183.5	177.5	213.7	214.5	241.9	198.4	143.1	162.1	148.5	187.0	161.0	174.1	2,205.3
Source: Korea Meteorological Administration

== History ==
Sangju has played an important role in much of Korean history. It first emerged after the Silla conquest of the area, in which minor states such as Goryeong Gaya (in Hamchang-eup) and Sabeol-guk (in Sabeol-myeon) were subjugated. The dates at which these conquests occurred are open to debate, but it is clear that the area was under firm Silla control by 505, and probably for some time before then.

Under Silla, the fortress of Sangju was one of the nine ju, or provincial administrative units, into which the portions of the kingdom near Gyeongju were divided. It played a critical role in regulating traffic along the east–west transit route which connected the Han River valley in the west (which Silla acquired in 553) with Gyeongju area. It would have been the first major city that Buddhist missionaries from Goguryeo would have reached when travelling down from Haneuljae Pass in the 6th century.

During the tumultuous decline of Unified Silla in the late 9th century, a number of rebellions occurred in Sangju, as they did throughout the country. Notable among them are the rebellions of Ajagae, who seized the fortress of Sangju and declared himself a general, and the Silla noble Bak Eon-chang, who established the kingdom of Sabeol-guk in the Sabeol-myeon area until he was defeated and overthrown by the Later Baekje leader Kyŏn Hwŏn in 927. Ajagae surrendered to Wang Kŏn in 918.

In 1895, as part of a general reorganization of local government, Sangju was designated Sangju-gun (Sangju County). In 1914, its boundaries were extended to cover Hamchang County, present-day Hamchang-eup. On January 1, 1986, separate administrative divisions were created for the city center (which was called Sangju City) and the outskirts (which continued to be called Sangju County). On January 1, 1995, the city and county were reunified to create the present-day entity of Sangju City.

Under Japanese occupation, the occupation government made various efforts to modernize local agriculture and resource extraction. The railroad through Sangju was completed in 1924, and around the same time the agricultural-training institution which would become Sangju National University was established.

In 2002, the first Carthusian monastery in Asia was established in the city, the Charterhouse Our Lady of Korea.

== Government ==
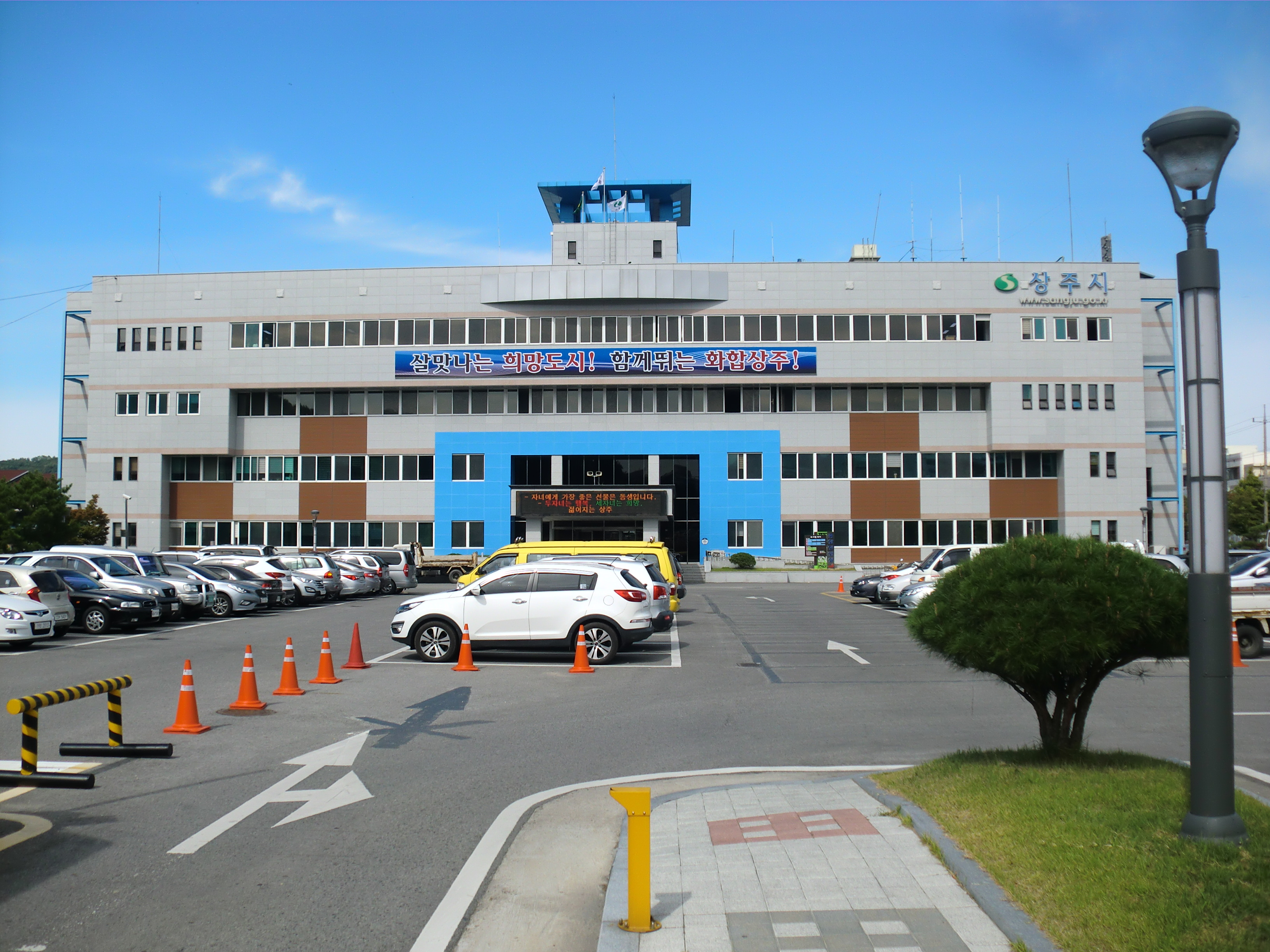
Sangju City Hall

The legislative and executive branches of Sangju are headed by officials elected by popular vote. This has been the case across South Korea since 1991, when local representative government was resumed after a thirty-year suspension. Under current South Korean law, elections are held once every four years. The most recent elections were held in June 2002.

=== Executive ===
The mayor of Sangju is Yeong-seok Kang, of the People Power Party (PPP).

=== Legislative ===
The city council of Sangju is the chief legislative organ of the district. Like the mayor, the members of the city council are elected every four years. The chairman of the Sangju city council is An Gyeong-suk (안경숙). The council which began serving in 2022 is the ninth council to represent the present-day entity of Sangju; the first was formed from the merger of the pre-existing councils of Sangju and Sangju County. There are 17 members. One member is elected from each eup, myeon, and dong, except for Sinheung-dong and Dongseong-dong, which share a single representative.

=== Judicial ===
The regional court of Sangju oversees local courts in Mungyeong and Yecheon County, in addition to Sangju. It reports to the provincial court in Daegu.

== Economy ==
The economy of Sangju is traditionally agricultural. Agriculture remains an important sector, as 40% of the city's residents are engaged in farming. Sangju has the largest number of farming households of any district in South Korea, and the most agricultural land of any district in North Gyeongsang.

The area has been famed for sericulture (silk production) since Silla times. Currently 243,000 m^{2} (2,615,630 sq ft) of land are employed for silk production, bringing in about 434 million won annually. In addition, numerous other cash crops are farmed in the area. The most important agricultural product is rice, of which the city Sangju produces the seventh most in the country, with 169.13 square kilometres (65.30 sq mi) in production yielding 162.9 billion won. Other important products include grapes, apples, pears, and cucumbers.

Sangju today is an important regional center of industry and commerce as well, having a significant economic impact on neighboring areas. This is facilitated by its strong transit connections (see Transportation, below). Sangju’s agricultural output also includes some specialized and traditional products such as dried persimmon and fruits raised at high altitude.

== Divisions ==
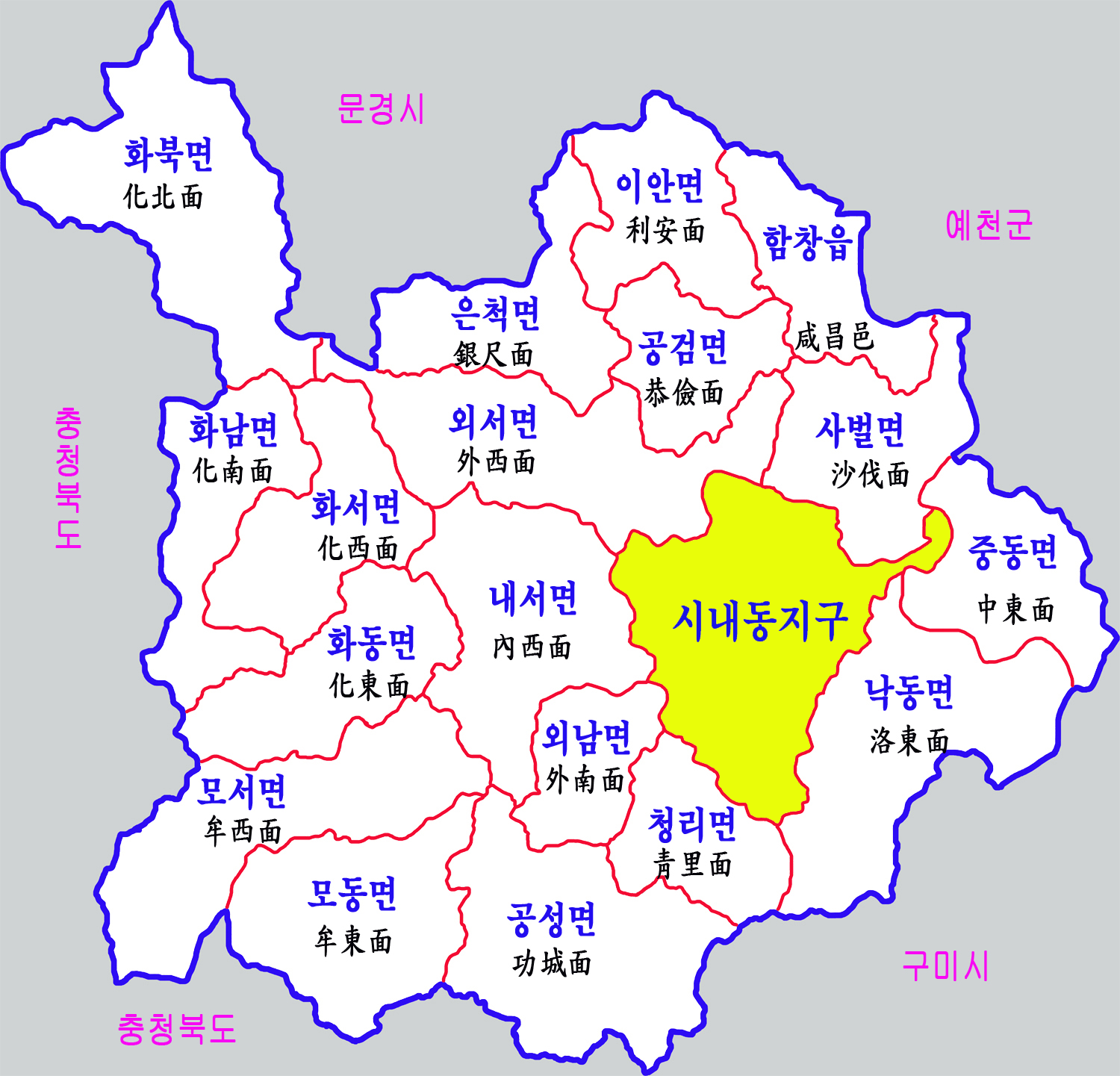
Map of Sangju eup/myeon/dong in Korean

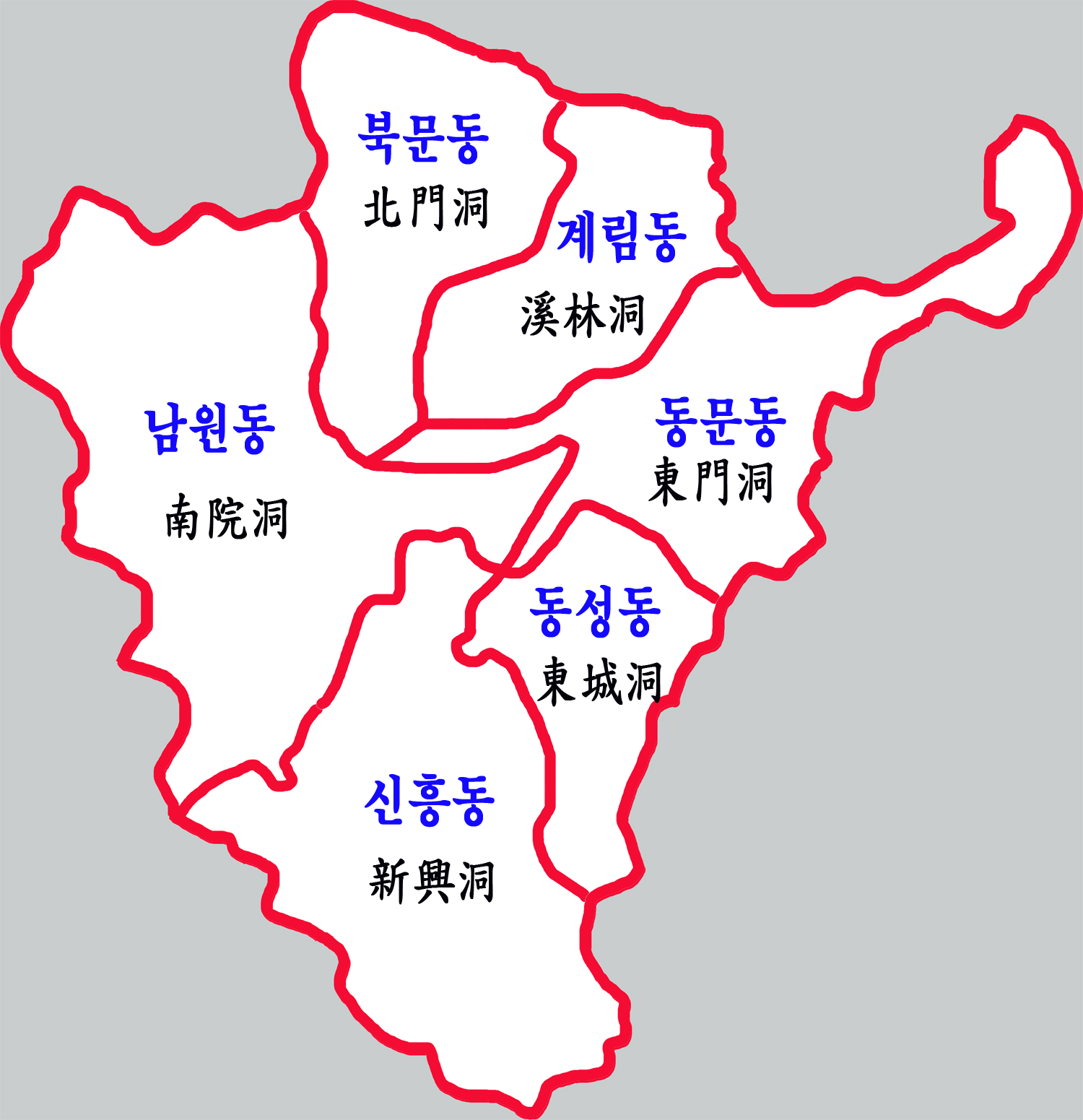
Inset map

Sangju is divided into one eup, seventeen myeon, and six dongs. These 24 primary divisions are made up of 361 ri.

The lone eup is Hamchang, on the city's northern border with Mungyeong.

From west to east along the city's northern border, the myeon are Hwabuk-myeon, Oeseo-myeon, Euncheok-myeon, and Ian-myeon which adjoins Hamchang-eup. From north to south along the western border are Sabeol-myeon, Jungdong-myeon, and Nakdong-myeon. From east to west along the southern border are Cheongni-myeon, Gongseong-myeon, Modong-myeon, and Moseo-myeon in the southwest corner. Along the central western border lie Hwadong-myeon and Hwanam-myeon. In addition, the interior of the city includes Hwaseo-myeon, Gonggeom-myeon, Naeseo-myeon and Oenam-myeon.

The dongs are clustered around the city center, and from 1986 to 1995 they constituted the entirety of Sangju (see "History, above). They are Bukmun-dong in the northern part of town, Gyerim-dong in the northeast, Dongmun-dong to the east, Dongseong-dong to the southeast, Sinheung-dong to the south, and Namwon-dong to the west. Namwon-dong is the most populous, with 13,334 registered residents (2002).

List of eup/myeon/dong
eup/myeon/dong	Hangeul	Hanja
Hamchang-eup	함창읍	咸昌邑
Sabeol-myeon	사벌면	沙伐面
Jungdong-myeon	중동면	中東面
Nakdong-myeon	낙동면	洛東面
Cheongni-myeon	청리면	靑里面
Gongseong-myeon	공성면	功城面
Oenam-myeon	외남면	外南面
Naeseo-myeon	내서면	內西面
Modong-myeon	모동면	牟東面
Moseo-myeon	모서면	牟西面
Hwadong-myeon	화동면	化東面
Hwaseo-myeon	화서면	化西面
Hwabuk-myeon	화북면	化北面
Oeseo-myeon	외서면	外西面
Euncheok-myeon	은척면	銀尺面
Gonggeom-myeon	공검면	恭儉面
Ian-myeon	이안면	利安面
Hwanam-myeon	화남면	化南面
Namwon-dong	남원동	南院洞
Bukmun-dong	북문동	北門洞
Gyerim-dong	계림동	溪林洞
Dongmun-dong	동문동	東門洞
Dongseong-dong	동성동	東城洞
Sinheung-dong	신흥동	新興洞

== Transportation ==
The Gyeongbuk Line railroad runs through Sangju, connecting to the main Gyeongbu Line in Gimcheon. It is thus possible to take passenger trains from Sangju to major southeastern cities such as Daegu and Busan. The Gyeongbuk Line carries both passenger and freight traffic, and provides an important link for people and businesses in the hinterland of Sangju. Aside from Sangju Station itself, stations are located in Sabeol-myeon (Baegwon Station), Gonggeom-myeon (Yangjeom Station), and Hamchang-eup (Hamchang Station) north of the city, and Cheongni-myeon (Cheongni Station) and Gongseong-myeon (Oksan Station) to the south.

The Jungbu Naeryuk Expressway, number 45, runs from north to south through the city and connects Sangju with the national expressway grid. The Sangju interchange is located near the city center, and the North Sangju interchange is near Hamchang. An additional expressway, number 30, which will run from west to east, is under construction.

In addition, national highways connect Sangju with many neighboring cities and towns. For example, National Road 3 has served as the traditional artery connecting Sangju with Mungyeong and Chungju, and National Road 25 continues to play an important role tying Sangju to its neighbor on the western side of the Sobaek mountains, Boeun County.

== Education ==
Like the rest of South Korea, Sangju has a three-tiered system of education: elementary, middle, and high. All public schools in the city are overseen by the Sangju Office of Education, which reports to the North Gyeongsang Provincial Office of Education. Most preschools (40 altogether) are also administered by the Office of Education, and are attached to elementary schools; however, five registered private preschools also operate in the city. In addition, the Sanghee School, which provides education for the mentally challenged from preschool to high school ages, is located in Namseong-dong in the city center.

There are 43 elementary schools in Sangju, including eleven branch schools. There are 17 public middle schools in the city, including two branch schools. Of these, one each is reserved exclusively for male and female students. In addition, there are five private middle schools, of which two are female-only, two male-only, and one coeducational. The city also boasts six private and six public high schools: four of the private and two of the public institutions are gender-segregated. Half of the high schools offer technical training, and half maintain a general academic focus.

Sangju is home to Sangju National University, a government-administered institution with a focus on agricultural technology. Many young people of college age leave the area to attend schools in the Seoul National Capital Area or other major cities.

== Twin towns – sister cities ==
Sangju is twinned with:

- Gochang County, North Jeolla Province (1999)
- Gangseo District, Seoul (2003)
- Davis, California, United States (2004)
- Yichun, Jiangxi, China (2005)
- Keelung, Taiwan (2013)

== See also ==
- List of cities in South Korea
- Sangju Bicycle Museum
- Tory Food
- People Power Party (South Korea)
