= Tory Food =

South Korean food company

- Hangul: 토리식품
- Hanja: 토리食品
- RR: Tori sikpum
- MR: T'ori sikp'um

Tory Food Co, Ltd. (Korean: 토리식품) is a Korean food company. Headquartered in Dongmak-ri, Gonggeom-myeon, Sangju, North Gyeongsang Province, it was established in 2001. It manufactures living food products and food under the brand Arirang Torirang (Korean: 아리랑 토리랑).

== Products ==
- Sauce and ketchup
- Curry powder
- Other products - Aricon Toricon, Arirang Torirang pumpkin soup, hot cake powder

== See also ==
- Economy of South Korea
