= Sangju Bicycle Museum =

Museum in North Gyeongsang Province, Korea

Sangju Bicycle Museum is located in Sangju-si, Gyeongsangbuk-do, the Republic of Korea. It is the only bicycle museum in South Korea.

The museum was originally built at Namjang-dong 229–1 in 2002, before moving to an expanded building at its current location in Donam-dong on October 27, 2010.

A wide variety of bicycles are on display, including a bicycle made of wood as well as modern bicycles. There is information on bicycles and Sanju, and souvenirs are available for purchase.

Admission is free. The museum is closed on Mondays, and its operating hours are from 9:00 to 18:00. Additionally, bicycles are available to rent for free.
