= Pony (make-up artist) =

South Korean make-up artist, blogger and Beauty YouTuber

- 포니
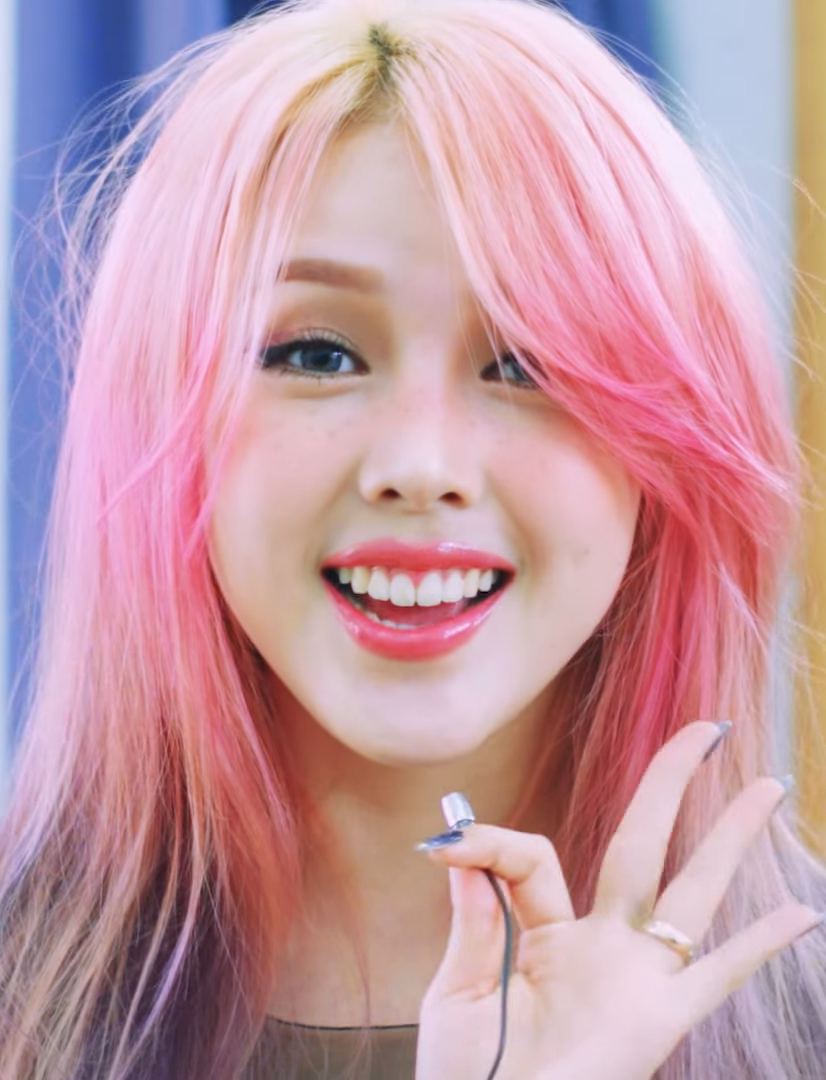
- Pony in December 2015
- Born: Park Hye-min; January 22, 1990 (age 36); South Korea
- Occupations: Make-up artist; blogger; Beauty YouTuber
- Years active: 2010–present

YouTube information
- Channel: Pony Syndrome
- Years active: 2015–present
- Genres: Beauty; vlog
- Subscribers: 5.87 million
- Views: 361 million

Korean name
- Hangul: 박혜민
- RR: Bak Hyemin
- MR: Pak Hyemin
- Last updated: June 22, 2026

Park Hye-min (Korean: 박혜민; born January 22, 1990), known professionally as Pony (포니) or Pony Park, is a South Korean make-up artist, blogger, and Beauty YouTuber. Pony is credited with popularizing Korean beauty trends worldwide. She was listed in Forbes 30 Under 30 Asia in 2017 for her make-up career.

Throughout her career, Pony has authored several how-to books on applying make-up and collaborated with multiple make-up brands. In addition, she is the founder of her own make-up brand, Pony Effect.

== Career ==
The name "Pony" came from her nickname at school, which she has used as her online name since. Having enjoyed drawing since childhood, Pony kept a blog on Cyworld and also began practicing make-up looks while she was a third-year high school student. She began posting video tutorials at the request of other users, which were positively received. Pony went to university to become a graphic designer and later worked at an office. In 2010, she was approached by a publisher to write a series of books on make-up tips, which were later released in 2011, 2012, and 2014 in Taiwan, Thailand, Indonesia, China, and Japan. She eventually quit her job to pursue make-up full-time. For a while, she also worked as a make-up artist for singer CL.

After launching her YouTube channel, Pony Syndrome, in 2015, Pony gained over 4,400,000 subscribers in 2018. This has been helped by her providing English subtitles to her videos and focusing on a diverse range of make-up looks for a global audience. In addition to posting make-up looks, Pony also created tutorials for celebrity transformations.

In 2015, Pony launched her make-up brand, Pony Effect, through the Korean beauty retailer Memebox.

== Personal life ==
Pony married her boyfriend in May 2017, whom she had been dating for 10 years. In addition to speaking her native language, Korean, Pony is also fluent in English.

== Endorsements ==
Pony has been a brand ambassador for Etude House since 2014. In 2018, Pony became a brand ambassador for Bobbi Brown, including releasing a promotional song titled "Outta My Mind." In 2019, Pony released collaboration make-up collections with MAC Cosmetics, ColourPop Cosmetics, Revolve, Etude House, and NYX Professional Makeup. For her collaboration with MAC Cosmetics, Pony released a digital single, "Divine", to promote its release. In 2020, she became the first Korean collaborator of the brand Morphe.

== Discography ==
Title	Year	Peak chart positions	Sales	Album
Title	Year	KOR	Sales	Album
"Outta My Mind"	2018	—	—	Non-album single
"Divine"	2019	—	—	Non-album single
"—" denotes releases that did not chart.

== Publications ==
=== Korean ===
Year	Title	Publisher	ISBN
2010	Pony's Secret Make-up Book (포니의 시크릿 메이크업북)	Login	ISBN 978-8964803950
2011	Pony's Special Make-up Book (포니의 스페셜 메이크업북)	Login	ISBN 978-8964806029
2012	Pony's Celeb Make-up Book (포니의 셀럽 메이크업 북)	Login	ISBN 978-8964808580
2014	Pony's Style Make-up Book (포니의 스타일 메이크업 북)	Login	ISBN 979-1155093122

=== Japanese ===
Year	Title	Publisher	ISBN
2014	"Kawaii Kao" wa Tsukurumono! Himitsu no Ulzzang Make (“かわいい顔"はつくるもの! 秘密のオルチャンメイク) (lit. Creating a Cute Face! The Secret Ulzzang Make-up)	Sweet Thick Omelet	ISBN 978-4907061081
2016	Watashi no Jijo Ichiban "Moreru" Himitsu no Ulzzang Make II (わたし史上いちばん“盛れる"秘密のオルチャンメイクII) (lit. My Best Beautification Ever: The Secret Ulzzang Make-up II)	Sweet Thick Omelet	ISBN 978-4907061173
