= Youngsook Park =

South Korean futurist (born 1955)

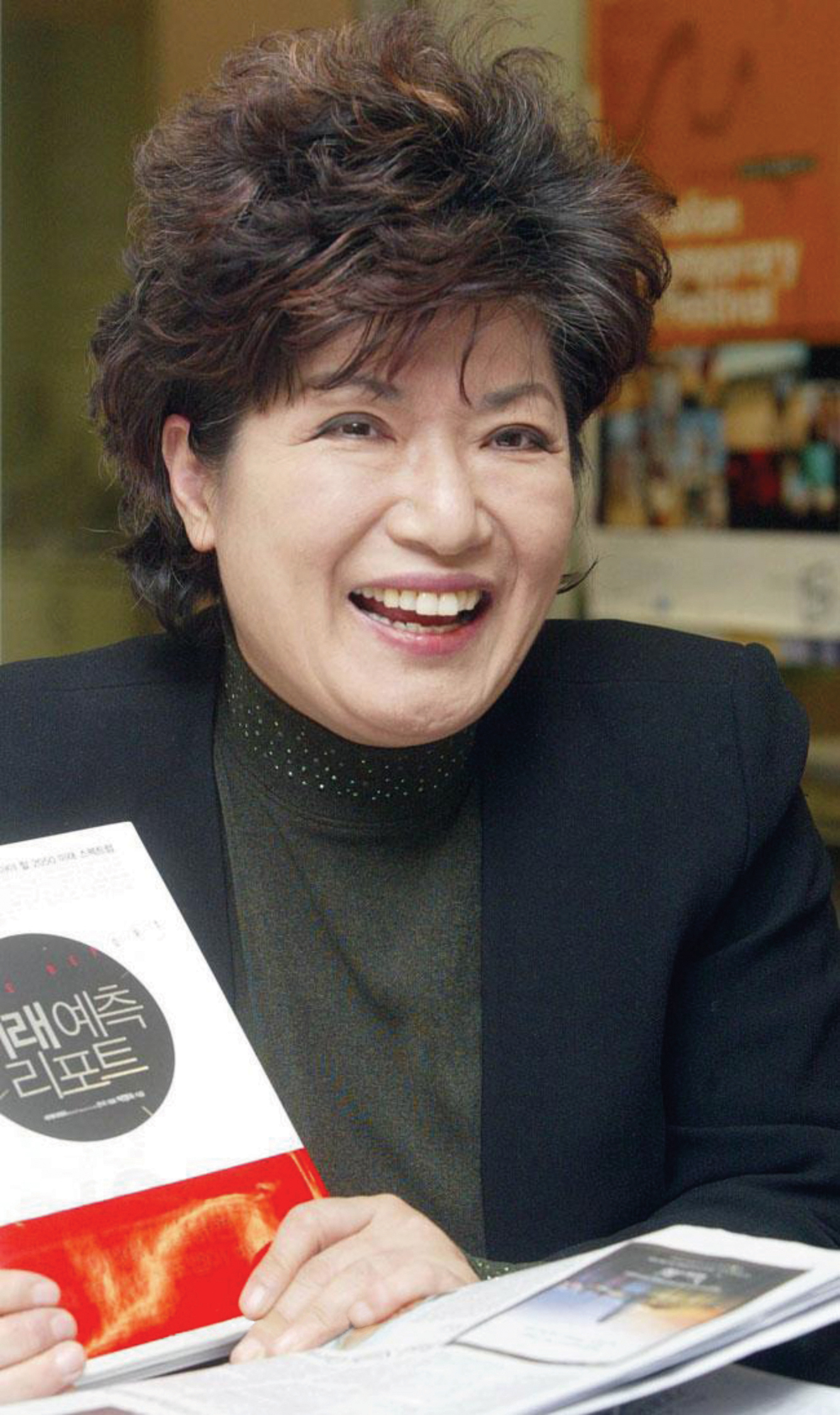
- Born: July 16, 1955 (age 70)
- Occupations: University Lecturer, futurist
- Notable work: Co-Author World Future Report 2045

Korean name
- Hangul: 박영숙
- RR: Bak Yeongsuk
- MR: Pak Yŏngsuk

Youngsook Park is a leading futurist from South Korea She serves as Chair of Millennium Project Korea Node. She also represents several global futures research organizations such as TechCastGlobal, and Davinci Institute. She has been Information Officer of the British Embassy Seoul (1982–2000) and Director of Public Diplomacy of the Australian Embassy Seoul (2000–2010) where she was trained as a futurist by attending World Future Society conferences, and other futurists meetings. Park is known for bringing global futurists to Korea for the last 30 years, and is a co-organizer of Korea Future Forum along with News1, a Korean news agency, inviting famous futurists to Seoul to speak on futures.

== Early life and education ==
Her academic education started in 1972 where she studied at the Kyungpook National University from 1972-1976. She earned a BA degree in French. From 1984-1986 she attended the University of Southern California earning a Master of Education. In 2003 she started coursework to obtain a Ph.D (so far 2020, not obtained.) in Social Welfare in 2007 at Sungkyunkwan University in Seoul, South Korea.

== Career ==
- Lecturer, Graduate School for Design, Ewha Woman's University (2013–present)
- Lecturer, Futures Studies, Yonsei University (2006–present)
- Chair, The Millenium Project Korea (UN Future Forum)
- Director, Business Development, Swytch token (Token Commons Foundation), South Korea
- Director, SingularityNet (OpenCog/AGI Society), South Korea
- President, Insilico Korea, South Korea (2017–present)
- CEO, Davinci MakerCenter, South Korea (2014–present)
- CEO, Solar Makers, South Korea (2011–present)
- Editor, Indaily Internet Newspaper, (2009–present)

== Futurist ==
Park uses her foresight skills to promote social justice and human development in Korea. She has been the Chair of South Korean Node of the Millennium Project, and the World Future Society in Korea since 2004. Park has represented South Korea in many global future-themed events such as the annual World Future Conferences, and has written research papers of future of Korean democracy which is claimed by Park, Park's Law. She has spoken at TedxYonsei for Future Megatrends and has her own radio and TV Futures Talks programs, and speaks on YouTube on futures in Korea. Park published or co-authored 13 volumes of "World Future Reports" annually in Korean which became popular futures book in Korea. Her "World Future Report 2045" became the No1 bestseller in Economy & Business Sector by Kyobo Books in 2015, and "World Future Report 2050" is No5 bestseller by Kyobo Books in 2016. She researches and teaches about future emerging technologies in her university classes. She writes many futures articles in her Indaily, a Korean Futures Internet Portal, i.e. Internet Newspaper in Seoul, Korea since 2012. She is often covered by the Korean media for New Year Special for Future Trends. The Choseekly kly covered Park for "2017 New Year Special" about her comments on what would happen to the Korean politics and future emerging technologies. Park is also the CEO of the Global Climate Change Situation Room and Solar Makers College, which was established by the Millennium Project Korea, in Gimcheon, Kyungbuk Province on 4 acres of land.

== Social activities in Korea ==
- She founded the Korea Foster Care Association to stop exporting Korean orphans to overseas.
- Park is a member of the Korean National Audit and Inspection Bureau (2014–present); a policy-making committee member of the Road Traffic Policy, Ministry of the Transportation and Land (2016–present); was a member of the Social Service R&D Committee, Ministry of Health & Welfare(2013–2015); was ICT Future Vision Committee, Ministry of Future Creative Science (2013–2015); was a member of the Regulation Lifting Committee, Ministry of Education (2008–13); was a member of the Future Strategy Committee, Ministry of Environment (2012–13); the Global Strategy Planning Committee, Ministry of Knowledge Economy(2012–2013); the Global Frontier Project Planning Committee, Ministry of Education (2009–10); the Korean Youth Commission, (Vice-Ministerial level position) appointed by the President (2005–10); etc.
- Park was also the Korean Government Policy Coordinator for Children, appointed by the Prime Minister (2004); the New Growth Engine Planning Committee member, Ministry of Knowledge Economy (2008–2009); the Future Land Maritime Technology Committee member, Ministry of Land & Maritime (2006–2007); the Korean Youth Commission appointed by President (Vice Ministerial level position), Youth Commission (Ministry) (2005–2010), etc.
- Together with several AI researchers Park co-founded the Asia AI Hub think tank dedicated to the development and applications of artificial intelligence and educational and outreach activities in Korea.

== Insilico Korea ==
Youngsook Park is the director of Insilico Korea, a joint venture with the Baltimore-based artificial intelligence company Insilico Medicine.

== Publications ==
1. World Future Report 2018 (2017)
2. Residence Revolution 2030 (2017)
3. Work Revolution 2030
4. World Future Report 2055 (2017)
5. World Future Report 2050 (2016)
6. AI Revolution 2030 (2016)
7. World Future Report 2045 (2015)
8. Energy Revolution 2030 (2015)
9. 2 novels, Double Cross (1996) & Komundo, 3 volumes (1997)
10. Korea Seen by Foreign Eyes (1998)
11. Kumkang Mountain Seen by Foreign Eyes (1998)
12. Future Report (2004)
13. Next Job (2006)
14. State of the Future 2004
15. State of the Future 2005

== Awards ==
1. "Family of the Year of 1999" by the Korean Christian Religion Research Institute/Federations
2. "3rd Family Culture Special Award" by Korean Women's Newspaper/Minister of Culture & Tourism (2002)
3. "Mother of April" by the National Assembly April Memorial Committee of MPs (2003)
4. "Most Contributed Person of 2003" by Minister of Government Administration/President, Blue House
5. "Child Welfare Promotion Award" by Minister of Health & Welfare (2004)
6. "Contribution to Korean FosterCare System" by Minister of Health & Welfare (2005).
