= Pak Yu-sung =

North Korean filmmaker

- Born: Pak Yu-sung; 26 October 1998 (age 27); Hyesan, North Korea
- Other name: Park Yoo-sung
- Education: Gangan High school
- Alma mater: Dongguk University
- Occupations: Documentary filmmaker; Human rights activist; Reporter; Producer
- Years active: 2018 - present

Pak Yu-sung (Korean: 박유성; born 1998) is a North Korean defector, documentary filmmaker, and human rights activist. He is known for his public speaking engagements where he shares his experiences of growing up in North Korea and his journey to freedom in South Korea.

== Early life and background ==
Pak grew up in Hyesan, a city in North Korea. His family was subject to social discrimination under the songbun system (a state-assigned social class system) after his grandmother was found to have a different religion, and his grandfather made a "mistake" in a speech. His future path in North Korea was limited, and he was likely to become a laborer. His father ran an illegal black market business, smuggling South Korean dramas into the country from China, an act punishable by death.

== Defection to South Korea ==
When Pak was 15, his father successfully defected to South Korea. Two years later, a broker arranged for Pak and his mother to cross the border into China. Their escape route took them through China, then south through Laos and Thailand before they arrived in South Korea.

Upon arriving in South Korea, Pak faced a significant cultural and social adjustment, having to learn basic skills such as how to use the internet and communicate effectively in a new environment.

== Career and activism ==
Pak graduated from Dongguk University in 2018, where he studied filmmaking. His personal experiences inspired his documentary film, "There Live Crocodiles in Mekong River," which won a Bronze Award at the 52nd Houston International Film Festival in 2019 and was the opening movie at the North Korean Human Rights Festival in 2018.

Pak is an active public speaker and a member of the Freedom Speakers International (FSI) North Korean Refugee Keynote Speakers Network. He speaks globally at various institutions and events, including Marist College, to educate audiences about the human rights situation in North Korea and the challenges faced by defectors. He currently works as a documentary producer and a freelance reporter, using his platform to advocate for change.

== Russia-Ukraine War ==
He reported that North Korean soldiers deployed to the front lines are warned that their families will be sent to political prison camps or executed if the soldiers are captured and reveal information to the enemy. This extreme pressure to avoid capture results in very few North Korean soldiers being taken as prisoners of war.

Pak's analysis, which aligns with South Korean intelligence reports, indicates that North Korean troops are being used as "cannon fodder" in high-risk, front-line assault operations. He noted that this likely results in massive casualties due to a lack of understanding of modern warfare.

Pak has suggested that captured North Korean soldiers could provide valuable intelligence to the U.S. and its allies regarding the North Korean military's strategies and capabilities, which are often exaggerated by Pyongyang.

== Awards and nominations ==
Name of the award ceremony, year presented, category, nominee of the award, and the result of the nomination
Award ceremony	Year	Category	Nominee / Work	Result	Ref.
52nd Houston International Film Festival	2019	Bronze Award	There Live Crocodiles in Mekong River	Won	
