= Gyeongae of Silla =

55th monarch of Silla (r. 924–927)

Gyeongae

King of Silla
- Reign: 924–927
- Coronation: 924
- Predecessor: Gyeongmyeong of Silla
- Successor: Gyeongsun
- Born: c.890s Unified Silla
- Died: 927; Unified Silla
- Issue: Grand Prince Geumseong; Grand Prince Gyerim
- House: House of Park
- Father: Sindeok
- Mother: Queen Uiseong
- Religion: Buddhism

Korean name
- Hangul: 박위응
- Hanja: 朴魏膺
- RR: Bak Wieung
- MR: Pak Wiŭng

Monarch name
- Hangul: 경애왕
- Hanja: 景哀王
- RR: Gyeongaewang
- MR: Kyŏngaewang

Gyeongae (died 927), personal name Pak Wiŭng, was the 55th ruler of the Koreanic kingdom Silla.

== Biography ==
He was the son of King Sindeok by Queen Uiseong, and was the younger brother of King Gyeongmyeong, who preceded him to the throne.

Gyeongae ascended the Silla throne in the midst of the Later Three Kingdoms period, and thus ruled over only a small portion of what had once been Unified Silla. He attempted to make common cause with Taejo of Goryeo, against Later Baekje such as sending troops to jointly fight against them, but this only provoked retaliation from Later Baekje. In the end, even that last remnant of Silla was overwhelmed by Later Baekje forces under Kyŏn Hwŏn.

When Kyŏn Hwŏn's army sacked Gyeongju in 927, they found Gyeongae and his queen partying at the Poseokjeong pavilion. This was due to the lightning advance of the Later Baekje forces which caught Silla off guard. The king was captured by the army of Later Baekje, and Kyŏn forced him to commit suicide, raped Gyeongae's primary consort, and permitted his underlings to sexually assault the Sillan royal concubines. Kyŏn Hwŏn tried to break the Koryo-Sillan alliance by setting Gyeongsun on the throne, and returned to the west.

King Gyeongae was buried on Namsan. His tomb is called "Haemongnyeong."

== Family ==
Parents

- Father: King Sindeok of Silla (? – 917)
  - Grandfather: Pak Yegyŏm (박예겸) or Pak Munwŏn
  - Grandmother: Lady Chŏnghwa (정화부인)
- Mother: Queen Uiseong of the Gyeongju Kim clan (의성왕후 김씨)
  - Maternal grandfather: Heongang of Silla
  - Maternal grandmother: Lady Ŭimyŏng (의명부인)

Consorts and their respective issue:

1. Unnamed wife
  1. Pak Kyosun, Grand Prince Geumseong (박교순 금성대군), 1st son
  2. Pak Sunhyŏn, Grand Prince Pak Kyerim (박순현 계림대군), 2nd son

== In popular culture ==
- Portrayed by Moon Wi-won in the 2000–2002 KBS1 TV series Taejo Wang Geon

== See also ==
- List of Korean monarchs
- List of Silla people
- Later Three Kingdoms of Korea

Gyeongae of Silla House of Kim Died: 927
Regnal titles
Preceded by Gyeongmyeong	King of Silla; Silla; 924–927	Succeeded by Gyeongsun
