= Park Byung-geon =

South Korean footballer

Park Byung-Geon
Personal information
- Full name: Park Byung-Geon (박병건)
- Date of birth: May 19, 1982 (age 44)
- Place of birth: Seoul, South Korea
- Height: 1.78 m (5 ft 10 in)
- Position: Forward

Senior career*
Years	Team	Apps	(Gls)
2005–2007	Changwon City FC		
- * Club domestic league appearances and goals as of Sep 2 2008

Park Byung-Geon (born May 19, 1982; Hanja:朴炳建, Korean: 박병건) is a South Korean football player who played as forward for Changwon City FC at National League in South Korea.
