= Gyeongmyeong of Silla =

54th monarch of Silla (r. 917–924)

Gyeongmyeong

King of Silla
- Reign: 917–924
- Coronation: 917
- Predecessor: Sindeok
- Successor: Gyeongae
- Born: 860; Gyeongju, Unified Silla
- Died: August 924 (aged 64); Gyeongju, Unified Silla
- Consort: Queen Jangsataek of the Kim clan (m. 880)
- House: Pak
- Father: Sindeok
- Mother: Queen Uiseong
- Religion: Buddhism

Korean name
- Hangul: 박승영
- Hanja: 朴昇英
- RR: Bak Seungyeong
- MR: Pak Sŭngyŏng

Monarch name
- Hangul: 경명왕
- Hanja: 景明王
- RR: Gyeongmyeongwang
- MR: Kyŏngmyŏngwang

Gyeongmyeong (860 – August 924), personal name Pak Sŭngyŏng, was the 54th ruler of the Koreanic kingdom Silla. He was the eldest son of King Sindeok and Princess Uiseong. He ruled during the Later Three Kingdoms period, when much of his country's former domain was divided between Later Baekje and Taebong.

In 918, Wang Kŏn overthrew Kung Ye, who had been the ruler of Taebong, and established Goryeo. Gyeongmyeong joined forces with him in 920, and their allied armies were able to repel a Later Baekje assault on Daeya Castle. However, after this many border commanders chose to desert Silla in favor of Goryeo, so Gyeongmyeong was left no better off than before. His son Prince Pak Ŏn-ch'ang, a Sillan commander stationed in Sabeol, was among those who were cut off and isolated due to the conflict with Later Baekje. As a result, Prince Ŏn-ch'ang founded the short-lived state of Later Sabeol in 919, and resisted Later Baekje for nearly ten years before falling in 927.

King Gyeongmyeong sought to get aid from Later Tang, and sent missions bearing tribute, but was unsuccessful. After his death in 924, King Gyeongmyeong was buried to the north of Hwangboksa temple and the throne was passed to his younger brother, King Gyeongae of Silla.

== Family ==
Parents

- Father: Sindeok of Silla (838 – 917)
  - Grandfather: Pak Ye-gyŏm (박예겸) or Park Mun-won (815 – ?)
  - Grandmother: Lady Jeonghwa of the Yi clan (정화부인 이씨; 819 – ?)
- Mother: Queen Uiseong of the Kim clan (의성왕후 김씨; 842 – ?)
  - Grandfather: Heongang of Silla (861 – 886)
  - Grandmother: Lady Uimyeong of the Kim clan (의명부인 김씨; 861 – ?)

Consorts and their respective issue:

- Queen Jangsataek of the Kim clan (장사택왕후 김씨; 860 – ?)
  - Lady Pak (박씨; b. 885), 1st daughter
    - married Chŏng Ŏn-ju (정언주; 885-963)
  - Pak Ŏn-ch'im, Grand Prince Milseong (밀성대군 박언침; b.887), 1st son
  - Pak Ŏn‐seong, Grand Prince Goyang (고양대군 박언성; b.889), 2nd son
  - Pak Ŏn-shin, Grand Prince Sokham (속함대군 박언신; b.891), 3rd son
  - Princess Sanghwa (상화공주; b. 892), 2nd daughter
    - married Paek Chang-jik (비조 중랑장 시중상장군 백창직; b. 890)
  - Pak Ŏn-rip, Grand Prince Juksan (죽성대군 박언립; b. 893), 4th son
  - Pak Ŏn-ch'ang, Grand Prince Husabeol (후사벌대군 박언창; b.895) , 5th son
  - Pak Ŏn-hwa, Grand Prince Wansan (완산대군 박언화; b. 897), 6th son
  - Pak Ŏn-ji, Grand Prince Gangnam (강남대군 박언지; b. 900), 7th son
  - Pak Ŏn-ŭi, Grand Prince Wolseong (월성대군 박언의; b. 901), 8th son
  - Pak Kyo-sun, Grand Prince Geumseong (금성대군 박교순; b.903) , 9th son

== See also ==
- List of Korean monarchs
- List of Silla people
- Later Three Kingdoms of Korea

Gyeongmyeong of Silla House of Pak Died: 924
Regnal titles
Preceded by Sindeok	King of Silla; Silla; 917–924	Succeeded by Gyeongae
