= Park Gil-ra =

South Korean actress and singer (1964 –1986)

- Hangul: 박길라
- RR: Bak Gilra
- MR: Pak Killa

Park Gil-ra (Korean: 박길라; 1964 –1986) was a South Korean actress and singer.

She was born in 1964. She was in "The Diary of High School Girl (고교생 일기)". She became known as "The Talent Singer" (탈렌트 가수). In October 1986, she suffered a heart attack and died.

== Songs ==
- Tree and Bird
- We really can't love you
- Love
- My love Annie
- You're a flower
- Nation, Nation
- Rage of Love
- Face buried in your heart
- Contradiction of Love
- Stray lovers
