= Jihyun Park =

British politician and defector from North Korea

Personal details
- Born: Park Ji-hyun; 30 July 1968 (age 58) Chongjin, North Korea
- Citizenship: North Korean (until 2008); British (since 2008)
- Party: Conservative
- Spouse: Kwang Hyun Joo (m. 2007)
- Children: 3

Jihyun Park (Korean: 박지현; born 30 July 1968) is a British Korean Conservative politician who contested the Moorside ward seat of Bury Metropolitan Borough Council at the 2021 elections. Although she did not win, Park is the first known person of North Korean descent to stand for election in the United Kingdom.

Park is a North Korean defector who escaped twice from the country, with the first attempt in 1998 resulting in forced repatriation and the second in 2008 being successful, and resides in the UK as a citizen.

== Biography ==
Park was born in North Korea in 1968. She crossed into China in 1998 with her brother, a Korean People's Army soldier. A smuggler promised Park a "well-paid job", but she was instead sold for 5,000 yuan into a forced marriage with a farmer, with whom she had a child. Park was subsequently brought back into a North Korean prison camp, where she was forced to work on farms.

In 2004, Park escaped again with the help of a local broker through mountainous terrain. Once back in China, she stayed for a few days in her former shelter and then fled to Beijing with her son, awaiting help from the South Korean embassy, but was later returned to the border. She did not give up and went to the United Kingdom as a refugee four years later, initially struggling with the English language and unable to communicate with anyone for some time. She eventually gained citizenship and settled permanently.

Park published a memoir, The Hard Road Out: One Woman's Escape from North Korea, in 2022.

== See also ==
- North Korean defectors
- 2021 United Kingdom local elections
