= Hyogong of Silla =

52nd monarch of Silla (r. 897–912)

Hyogong of Silla 효공왕 孝恭王
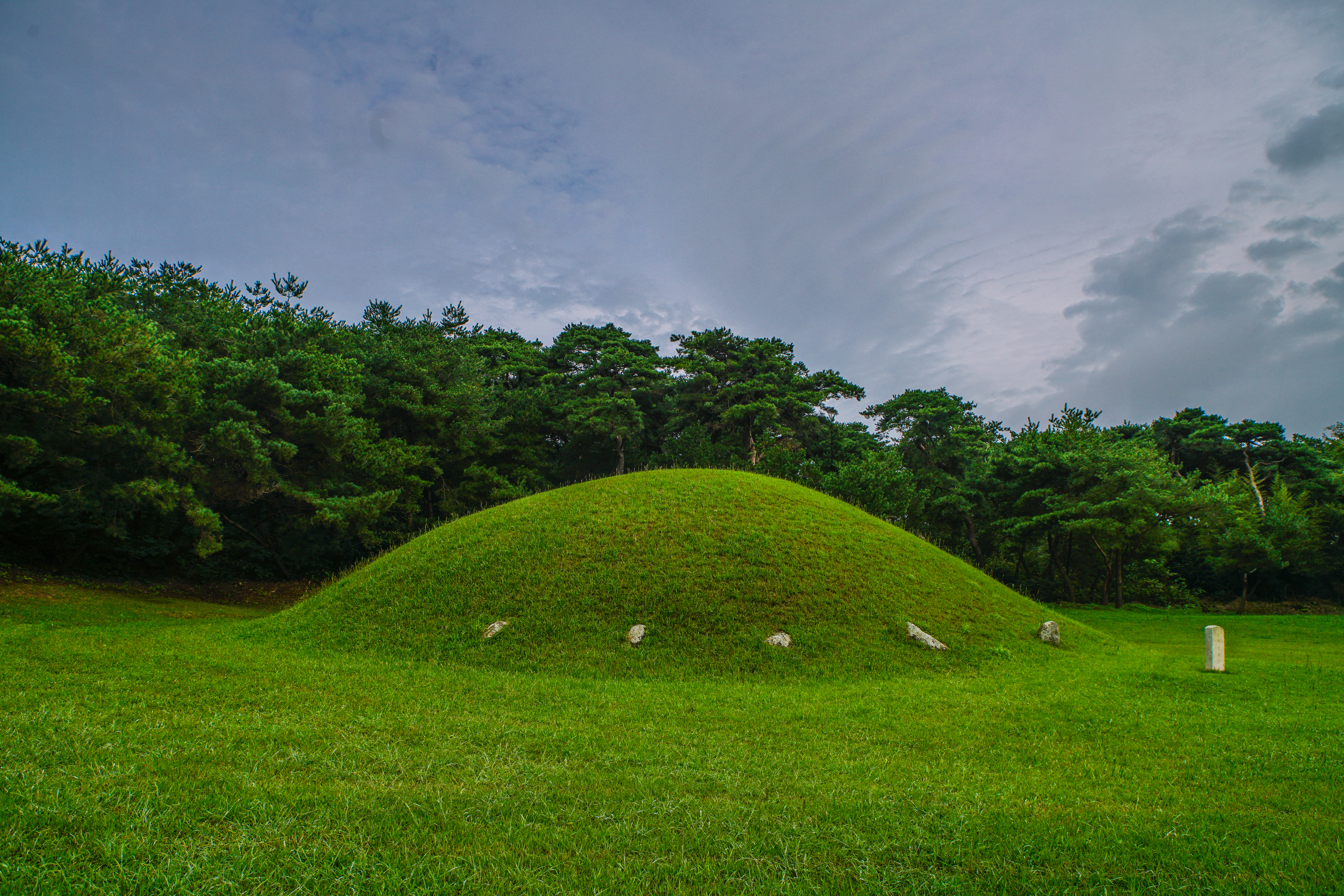
- Tomb of King Hyogong

King of Silla
- Reign: 897-912
- Coronation: 897
- Predecessor: Jinseong of Silla
- Successor: Sindeok of Silla
- Born: 885; Unified Silla
- Died: 912 (aged 27); Unified Silla
- House: Kim
- Father: Heongang of Silla
- Mother: Queen Uimyeong
- Religion: Buddhism

Korean name
- Hangul: 김요
- Hanja: 金嶢
- RR: Gim Yo
- MR: Kim Yo

Monarch name
- Hangul: 효공왕
- Hanja: 孝恭王
- RR: Hyogongwang
- MR: Hyogongwang

Hyogong (885–912), personal name Kim Yo, was the 52nd ruler of the Korean kingdom of Silla. He was the illegitimate son of King Heongang by Lady Uimyeong. He married the daughter of Ichan Ugyeom. His reign saw the collapse of Silla's authority across its northern and western provinces, as rebel warlords such as Kung Ye and Kyŏn Hwŏn rose to power. This period, known as the Later Three Kingdoms saw the breakup of Silla, as the previously defeated Goguryeo and Baekje were revived as Taebong and Hubaekje across what had once been the western and northern provinces of Unified Silla.

In 905, Silla lost its holdings to the northeast of Jungnyeong pass. In 907, Kyŏn Hwŏn's Later Baekje forces seized ten castles to the south of Ilseon. Faced with these defeats, the king turned to drink and neglected state affairs. Upon his death in 912, he was buried to the north of Sajasa temple.

== Family ==
Parents

- Father: Heongang of Silla
  - Grandfather: Gyeongmun of Silla
  - Grandmother: Queen Munui of the Kim clan (문의왕후 김씨)
- Mother: Queen Uimyeong (의명부인), of the Kim clan (의명왕후 김씨)

Consorts and their respective issue:

- Queen Park, of the Pak clan (왕비 박씨) –was the daughter of Pak Ye-gyŏm (박예겸) and the sister of Sindeok of Silla

== Media ==
- Portrayed by Han Geun-ok in the 2000 KBS1 TV series Taejo Wang Geon

== See also ==
- List of Korean monarchs
- List of Silla people
- Later Three Kingdoms of Korea

Hyogong of Silla House of Kim Born: 883 Died: 912
Regnal titles
Preceded by Jinseong	King of Silla; Silla; 897–912	Succeeded by Sindeok
