= Soo Sunny Park =

Korean-American artist

Soo Sunny Park is a Korean American artist. Park was originally from Seoul, South Korea, before she moved to the United States at the age of ten, and grew up in Marietta, Georgia and Orlando, Florida. She has both a B.F.A. in painting and sculpture, and a M.F.A. in sculpture, the first originating from Columbus College of Art and Design (Columbus, Ohio) and the latter from Cranbrook Academy of Art (Bloomfield Hills, Michigan.) After acquiring her degrees, she went on to obtain a residency at Skowhegan School of Painting and Sculpture circa 2000. She resides in New Hampshire, USA and teaches at Dartmouth College.

== Awards ==
Park has received several rewards and accolades for her work, including:

- “Best of 2001, Sculptor of St. Louis” River Front Times
- Joan Mitchell M.F.A Grant
- The 19th Annual Michigan Fine Arts Competition Grand Prize
- The Helen Foster Barnett Prize The National Academy Museum
- The Rockefeller Foundation Bellagio Center Fellowship

== Exhibitions ==
- Photo-kinetic Grid, You Are Here: Light, Color, and Sound Experiences exhibition, NC Museum of Art, 4/2018
- BioLath, Currier Museum of Art, Manchester, NH 4/2017
- Luminous Muqarna, Islamic Arts Festival, 19th, Sharjah Art Museum, United Arab Emirates
- Unraveling Neon, in Sustaining Life Exhibition, Waterfall Mansion Gallery, 5th Floor, NYC, 9/2016
- Unwoven Light, Marshall M. Fredericks Sculpture Museum, MI, 10/2016
- Unwoven Light, Dennos Museum Center, Traverse City, MI, 6/2016
- Hybrid Objects, Abigail Ogilvy Gallery, Boston, MA, 6/2015
- Martin Shallenberger Artist-in-Residency and Silver Linings, Cheekwood Botanical Garden and Museum of Art, Nashville, TN, summer 2015
- Permanent Public Sculpture, Keelung Railway Station, Taiwan, 7/2015
- Lumière - Play of Brillants, curated by Light Collective, Éléphant Paname, Paris, France, 3/2015
- Boundary Conditions, New Britain Museum of American Art, New Britain, CT, spring, 2017
- Unwoven Light: Soo Sunny Park, Rice Gallery, Houston, TX, 4/2013
- Soo Sunny Park: Vapor Slide, Cranbrook Art Museum, Bloomfield Hills, MI, 11/2012
- New Art >> New Hampshire V, Thorne-Sagendorph Art Gallery, Keene, NH, 8/2012
- Permanent Collection, Nancy Margolis Gallery, NYC, 7/2012
- Capturing Resonance, DeCordova Sculpture Park and Museum, Lincoln, MA, 9/2011
