= Memoirs of Lady Hyegyŏng =

Autobiography of a Korean noblewoman

- Date: 1795–1805
- Place of origin: Joseon
- Language: Korean
- Author: Lady Hyegyŏng

Korean name
- Hangul: 한중록
- Hanja: 閑中錄
- RR: Hanjungnok
- MR: Hanjungnok

The Memoirs of Lady Hyegyŏng (Korean: 한중록; Hanja: 閑中錄; lit. ''Records Written in Silence'') is an autobiographical manuscript written by Lady Hyegyŏng (1735–1816) detailing her life during the years she lived in Changgyeonggung. It is a collection of four autobiographical pieces written within a ten-year period (1795 to 1805), which depict her life before and after being chosen to marry Crown Prince Sado.

The memoirs famously depict Crown Prince Sado's descent into violent madness that led to his execution by order of his father, King Yeongjo. Although Lady Hyegyŏng's descriptions of her husband's madness and execution are the best known parts of her work, each of the four pieces concentrates on a different aspect of her life and has a different political purpose. Her narratives are a primary historical source for the period. They are also part of a wider body of Joseon female-authored works.

== Background ==
Lady Hyegyŏng was well-educated for a woman of her time, as her natal family, the Pungsan Hong clan, had been scholars and court officials for generations. The Memoirs of Lady Hyegyŏng display her knowledge of the appropriate structure for literary works such as biographies, chronicles, and memorials. This knowledge permitted her to write about a realm of politics generally reserved for men.

Lady Hyegyŏng, as a Confucian wife, was subordinate to her husband and her husband's family. She stated that she could not say any "unjust" word about them without becoming "unable to avoid the most cruel death by the gods of Heaven". She acknowledged this in her fourth memoir, recording that she was "deeply indebted to [King Yeongjo]" and that "her devotion to [Crown Prince Sado] reaches as high as the Heavens".

The memoirs cannot be taken as accurate in every respect. JaHyun Kim Haboush was able to identify an inaccuracy in Lady Hyegyŏng's mention of her younger brother's date of birth. According to Haboush, this might have been an attempt to protect her mother from criticism because the actual year her brother was born may suggest he was conceived when Lady Hyegyŏng's mother was in mourning. When a person was in mourning, they were supposed to be sexually abstinent.

== Structure ==
The memoirs include four distinct pieces written in 1795, 1801, 1802, and 1805, respectively. The earliest was the most personal and the following pieces gradually became directed to the public.

The memoirs have been translated into English by JaHyun Kim Haboush.

== The Memoir of 1795 ==
=== Form ===
Lady Hyegyŏng's first memoir in 1795 was dedicated to her nephew, the heir of her natal family, the Pungsan Hong clan. It was written to defend her father and herself for their actions before and after Crown Prince Sado's execution. It covered her idyllic childhood through to her knowledge of the intrigues of the eighteenth century Joseon court.

The memoir is remarkable because of its female authorship and narration style. This departure from tradition may be because the author was both well-educated and very uniquely placed.

The narration is that of self-justification. Lady Hyegyŏng wrote to defend her decision not to commit suicide and that of her father not to leave office following Crown Prince Sado's execution. The Memoir of 1795 is in the structure of a family chronicle, which were typically written by men, and is unusual in the conveying of strong emotions. The thematic presentation is that of self-reflection rather than the more usual presentation of a morality tale for future generations. JaHyun Kim Haboush states the view that the first memoir is less advice to her nephew than an emotive defence against the numerous accusations levied and scandals of the time.

=== Content ===
According to tradition, Lady Hyegyŏng was invited to the palace as a young child along with other girls whose names were submmited for the royal bridal selection. Lady Hyegyŏng described herself as favored from the outset by King Yeongjo and his first wife, Queen Jeongseong. She portrayed her introduction to life away from her parents as affecting because of the formalities and distancing that were required. She expressed regret that her position encouraged family members to become involved with court politics.

The Memoir of 1795 emphasizes the affection and loyalty that Lady Hyegyŏng and her father had for the royal family. Such affection and loyalty to the king were relied on to justify their reaction to the execution of Crown Prince Sado. Service to her own son, the future King Jeongjo, was also emphasised as a means of protecting the dynastic line. Of the aftermath of Sado's execution, Lady Hyegyŏng stated, "Like me, [my father's] only thought and concern was to protect the Grand Heir, and so, for the sake of the nation, he controlled his sorrow and did not retire from office."

== The Memoir of 1801 ==
=== Form ===
The Memoir of 1801 was written in protest of the recent execution of the author's brother based on false charges of converting to Catholicism, as well as the earlier execution of her uncle based on accusations of opposition to King Jeongjo's regency. The memoir was written in the usual form of a memorial, a literary format typically used to express strong negative feelings. As JaHyun Kim Haboush clarifies: "... there is a category [of memorials sent to the throne] reserved for those who felt aggrieved about something concerning themselves or persons close to them such as family members or mentors. Their memorials tended to be narratives in which the authors refuted unfavorable accounts by presenting contrary evidence and displaying appropriate emotion". The aim of a memorial was to offer a convincing argument to refute court decisions. In this case, Lady Hyegyŏng attributed her brother's execution to factionalism within the Joseon court, not to any Catholicism. Her memorial is uncommon in that it addresses the king directly about a personal grievance. While memorials were traditionally used by politicians to ostensibly discuss public affairs, Lady Hyegyŏng, as the king's biological grandmother, instead used the memorial form to raise a private issue with King Sunjo.

=== Content ===
The Memoir of 1801 also contains exposition regarding Princess Hwawan's court machinations against the Pungsan Hong clan, which, the author claims, turned King Jeongjo against them. At the height of Princess Hwawan's power, according to Lady Hyegyŏng, her rival had enough influence over Jeongjo to prevent him from becoming intimate with his wife, Queen Hyoui. Furthermore, it is asserted that as Princess Hwawan's adopted son, Jeong Hu-gyeom, became more powerful at court, an alleged decline in the Pungsan Hong clan's influence led others to compose memorials attacking them.

== The Memoir of 1802 ==
=== Form ===
The Memoir of 1802 narrates the life of King Jeongjo as a young boy grappling with the execution of his biological father. Lady Hyegyŏng wrote her third memoir after Jeongjo's sudden death. Addressed to her grandson, King Sunjo, the memoir was used to introduce Jeongjo's unfulfilled plan to restore the honor of Sado and the Pungsan Hong clan. Allegedly, Jeongjo intended his own son, upon taking the throne, to give full honors to both Sado and Lady Hyegyŏng.

Although Lady Hyegyŏng chose the form of a biography, it was used as a channel for exploring Jeongjo's character as a filial son dedicated to restoring his family's honor rather than a depiction of him as a political figure. The memoir presses the thwarted plan by implying that Sunjo should show filial piety to Jeongjo by completing what Jeongjo had left unfinished.

=== Content ===
The Memoir of 1802 was designed to secure reinstament for Sado and the Pungsan Hong clan. The text focuses on Jeongjo's reaction to Sado's death and his subsequent attempts to restore his name. Lady Hyegyŏng described Jeongjo as "peerless in benevolence", and throughout the memoir she gives various examples of Jeongjo's filial piety. She claimed he "served [her] with all the wealth and splendor available to the throne, yet he did not think it enough" and "still regretted he could not pay respect to his father morning and evening".

Lady Hyegyŏng affirmed that Jeongjo's realization of his maternal grandfather's innocence and regret of his earlier actions proved his intelligence. She also mentioned court rumors suggesting that it was her father's idea to have Sado executed in the rice chest, which she denied as "ridiculous".

== The Memoir of 1805 ==
=== Form ===
Lady Hyegyŏng gave a personal account of her husband in the Memoir of 1805, describing his eventual madness and execution. There had been public speculation surrounding Sado's execution or, as it came to be called, "The 1762 Incident". Sado lived to be 27 years old before his execution was ordered by his father, King Yeongjo, because of accusations that included the physical abuse, rape, and murder of palace servants. However, following a memorial sent to Yeongjo by his grandson, Jeongjo, sections of the Diaries of the Royal Secretariat detailing Sado's actions and execution were destroyed. With their erasure, conspiracy theories had surfaced regarding whether Crown Prince Sado actually committed crimes worthy of death, as well as speculation on who had thought up so gruesome a manner of execution.

Lady Hyegyŏng was the only living family member who had witnessed Sado's execution. She recorded her version of what happened both for the public, and for her grandson. This last was explicitly stated. She asserted the conspiracy theories surrounding Sado were "false and groundless". She claimed that it would be wrong of her to leave the king uninformed as to his direct ancestors. In such a case, he would have been in "shameful ignorance". She deliberately created the sole surviving primary account that explains Sado's execution.

Lady Hyegyŏng used the memoir to explain why she and her son, Jeongjo, lived on after Sado's execution. Traditionally, when the male head of a household was executed as a criminal, his wife and children were expected to follow him in death. Had Sado been executed as a criminal normally was, his eldest son, the only direct heir to the throne, would have been executed, as would the rest of his family. The suggestion is that the unusual manner of Sado's death was designed to ensure the line of succession remained legitimate. If that is correct, any suicide by Lady Hyegyŏng would have suggested criminality on the part of her husband. Moreover, to ensure that Jeongjo's reputation was not affected by Sado's actions, King Yeongjo declared him to be the adopted son of Sado's long deceased half-brother, Crown Prince Hyojang.

=== Content ===
Although Lady Hyegyŏng admits to being biased due to her devotion as Sado's wife, she nonetheless describes Sado as intelligent, compassionate, and handsome. Lady Hyegyŏng partly attributed Sado's madness and violence to his failed relationship with his father, King Yeongjo, as opposed to having an innately evil nature. In addition, she condemned the fact that soon after his birth, Sado was sent to live alone in a separate residence. He was raised by eunuchs and palace ladies, which Lady Hyegyŏng described as "unpleasant and peculiar".

While his parents visited often at first, as Sado grew older he saw them less and less. Lady Hyegyŏng noted that the servants attending to Crown Prince Sado had also served King Gyeongjong, the previous king whom Yeongjo had been accused of poisoning. She alleged the servants were so rude to Yeongjo and Concubine Yeong that it discouraged them from visiting. While Lady Hyegyŏng questioned why Yeongjo refused to replace them, Haboush explains that Yeongjo likely feared that by replacing Gyeongjong's servants, he would face rumors questioning his loyalty to his late brother. Lady Hyegyŏng also ascribed Sado's abnormalities to her own belief that his residence was cursed. The residence was the location of Queen Seonui's death, and encompassed the former quarters of Concubine Hui, the infamous consort of Yeongjo's father who had been executed for killing Queen Inhyeon using black magic. Lady Hyegyŏng believed that this supernatural influence negatively affected Sado's development.

Although Sado had at first been a good student, his fear of his father prevented him from expressing himself clearly, leading to King Yeongjo continually admonishing him. As Sado did not see his father often and when he did Yeongjo's criticism grew increasingly harsh, Sado began to fear his father more and more. Lady Hyegyŏng described the first time Sado became violent as having taken place after he was criticized by his father in front of a large crowd.

The first person Lady Hyegyŏng saw Sado kill was a eunuch whom he beheaded. Sado brought the head to show his wife and her palace ladies. After this, she declared, his behavior escalated. Though she did not give any numbers of how many Sado killed or raped, she noted it was so many that she could not remember. While she claimed Sado didn't treat her in the same way, Lady Hyegyŏng stated he would beat any woman who resisted his sexual overtures and that he "tore their flesh" until they gave in. Despite the intensity of Sado's violence, Lady Hyegyŏng only reported one incident in which he physically harmed her — by throwing a go board at her head, damaging her eye. She wrote that "the situation was so difficult that [she] was in constant danger, to the point of not knowing when [her] life would end". At the height of his violence, bodies and injured people had to be carried from the palace every day. As crown princess, Lady Hyegyŏng's duties included replacing those injured or killed by Sado as well as compensating for the aftermath of his violence.

In one instance, after Sado left the palace without approval, Lady Hyegyŏng, along with some of Sado's attendants, created an elaborate ruse to hide Sado's absence. Thus, the chief eunuch pretended to be Sado and claimed illness, locking himself in Sado's chambers. There he was served by the rest of the attendants as if he were the actual crown prince. Lady Hyegyŏng described Sado's absence as a "welcomed respite".

As Sado grew older, his fear and anger spread to other parts of his life. Although Lady Hyegyŏng was unaware of it, court records of King Yeongjo and Crown Prince Sado's interactions reveal Yeongjo scolding Sado that "the thunder on the previous night was a warning that [Sado] should develop moral virtue". Lady Hyegyŏng records Sado becoming so afraid of thunder that he would lie on the ground until the storm was over. She claimed Sado's fear grew so intense he became too afraid even to look at the character for thunder.

Furthermore, Sado developed a phobia of clothing that required him to burn them as part of a ritual. His obsessions lengthened the time he required to dress. He also used large amounts of clothing, so much so that his stipend as crown prince could not cover the expenses. Consequently, Lady Hyegyŏng reported being forced to borrow money from her father and having to spend much of her own time making new clothes. Sado's process for getting dressed was sometimes deadly. Lady Hyegyŏng mentioned that if servants "made the slightest error" in helping him, "people were hurt, even killed". Even his favorite consort, a woman named Park Bing-ae who had given birth to two of his sons, was beaten to death after Sado became irritated with her while trying to get dressed.

King Yeongjo eventually learned of Sado's behavior. Yeongjo confronted his son, but no consequences were ordered because Sado attributed his actions to being "sad that [Yeongjo] does not love [him] and being terrified when [Yeongjo] criticizes [Sado]". Instead, the confrontation ended with Yeongjo promising to support his son better.

It was only later, after his biological mother, Concubine Yeong, became aware of Sado's growing madness that he faced punishment. After a rumor spread that Sado had attempted to assassinate his father, Lady Hyegyŏng received a letter from Concubine Yeong in which she apologised preemptively. Shortly afterwards, Sado was executed by being locked in a rice chest and left to die of dehydration and possibly of starvation.

== Significance ==
The Memoirs of Lady Hyegyŏng is one of the few pre-modern autobiographies written by a woman in East Asia. At the time when Lady Hyegyŏng began her memoirs, female narratives had become more frequent in Korea. Haboush suggests this increase in female narratives is connected to the decrease of yangban women's inheritance rights. On that basis, women wrote in order to document changes in customs and family structures. Korean script (hangul) had been used by women and the lower classes ever since its invention by Sejong the Great in the later half of the 15th century.

Lady Hyegyŏng, from her position at court, provided details that official records did not. She described the private life of the court; her subjects included King Yeongjo, King Jeongjo, Princess Hwawan, Jeong Hu-gyeom, and Hong Guk-yeong, thus making the Memoirs of Lady Hyegyŏng a primary historical source as to them.

In the very contrast to Lady Hyegyŏng's narratives, royal figures were traditionally portrayed as exalted, moral personages in order to legitimize their reigns.

== In popular culture ==
The memoirs have either inspired or been adapted into other media.

- The novel The Red Queen by Margaret Drabble is based on the memoirs.
- Lady Hyegyŏng was portrayed by Choi Myung-gil in the 1988 MBC TV series The Memoirs of Lady Hyegyŏng.
- Lady Hyegyŏng was portrayed by Ha Hee-ra in the 1988–1989 KBS2 TV series Oh, Heaven.
- Lady Hyegyŏng was portrayed by Hong Ri-na in the 1998 MBC TV series King of the Wind.
- Lady Hyegyŏng was portrayed by Jung Ae-ri in the 2007 CGV series Eight Days, Assassination Attempts against King Jeongjo.
- Lady Hyegyŏng was portrayed by Kyeon Mi-ri in the 2007 MBC TV series Lee San, Wind of the Palace.
- Lady Hyegyŏng was portrayed by Kim Sung-ryung in the 2014 film The Fatal Encounter.
- Lady Hyegyŏng was portrayed by Park Eun-bin in the 2014 SBS TV series Secret Door.
- Lady Hyegyŏng was portrayed by Moon Geun-young in the 2015 film The Throne.
- Lady Hyegyŏng was portrayed by Kang Mal-geum in the 2021 MBC TV series The Red Sleeve.

== See also ==
- List of monarchs of Korea
- History of Korea
