= Crown Prince Uiso =

Joseon prince (1750–1752)

- Crown Prince of Joseon (posthumously); Crown Prince of Korea (posthumously)

Grand Heir of Joseon
- Tenure: 6 June 1751 – 17 April 1752
- Predecessor: Grand Heir Yeon
- Successor: Grand Heir San
- Born: 27 September 1750; Gyeongchunjeon, Changgyeonggung, Hanseong, Joseon
- Died: 17 April 1752 (aged 1); Tongmyeongjeon, Changgyeonggung, Hanseong, Joseon
- Burial: Uiryeongwon, Seosamneung Cluster, Goyang, South Korea
Names
- Yi Jeong (이정; 李琔)
Posthumous name
- Joseon: Grand Heir Uiso (의소세손; 懿昭世孫); Korean Empire: Crown Prince Uiso (의소세자; 懿昭世子 → 의소태자; 懿昭太子) (Note: Elevated to "Heir Son" (세자; 世子; Seja) in September 1899, then further raised to "Supreme Son" (태자; 太子; Taeja) in October 1901.)
- Clan: Jeonju Yi
- Dynasty: Yi
- Father: King Jangjo
- Mother: Queen Heongyeong
- Religion: Confucianism (Neo-Confucianism)

Korean name
- Hangul: 의소세자
- Hanja: 懿昭世子
- RR: Uiso seja
- MR: Ŭiso seja

Crown Prince Uiso (Korean: 의소세자; Hanja: 懿昭世子; 27 September 1750 – 17 April 1752), personal name Yi Jeong, was the elder son of Crown Prince Sado and Lady Hyegyeong. He was born as second in line to the throne during the reign of his grandfather, King Yeongjo, the 21st monarch of Joseon. His younger brother became King Jeongjo.

== Biography ==
His mother, Lady Hyegyŏng of the Pungsan Hong clan was the great-great-great-granddaughter of Princess Jeongmyeong, the only daughter of Queen Inmok and King Seonjo. Due to intermarriage within the royal family, Princess Jeongmyeong was also his 5th great-grandaunt and 4th great-grandmother.

His maternal grandfather was Chief State Councilor Hong Bong-han, whose younger brother was Hong In-han, another prominent official of the period.

Yi Jeong was the first grandson of the King Yeongjo and his father, Crown Prince Sado, was Yeongjo's second and only surviving son (his elder brother, Crown Prince Hyojang, had died at the age of 9, seven years prior to Sado's birth). Sado suffered from severe mental disorders and was often at odds with his father.

Yi Jeong was born in 1750, in Changgyeonggung. Half a year later, King Yeongjo declared him grand heir (왕세손; 王世孫).

In December 1751, his aunt, Crown Princess Hyeon, died. Soon after, on 17 April 1752, Yi Jeong also passed away. Yeongjo took both of their deaths hard and grieved for some time.

He was given a state funeral, on special instructions from his grandfather. Yeongjo gave him the posthumous name Uiso (의소; 懿昭), and personally composed the eulogy and epitaph. His body was buried to the south of Mount Ahnhyon, and the tomb was known as Uisomyo (의소묘; 懿昭墓).

His younger brother, Yi San, was born several months after his death; he became grand heir in 1759, and would ascend to the throne in 1776. In 1762, Crown Prince Sado was executed through starvation after being locked in a rice chest.

During Gojong's reign, his tomb was upgraded to Uiryeongwon (의령원; 懿寧園). On 7 June 1949, it was relocated to the Seosamneung Cluster in Goyang, Gyeonggi Province.

== Family ==
- Father: King Jangjo (장조대왕; 13 February 1735 – 12 July 1762)
  - Grandfather: King Yeongjo (영조대왕; 31 October 1694 – 22 April 1776)
  - Biological grandmother: Concubine Yeong (영빈), of the Jeonui Yi clan (전의 이씨; 5 August 1696 – 12 August 1764)
  - Adoptive grandmother: Queen Jeongseong (정성왕후), of the Daegu Seo clan (대구 서씨; 2 January 1693 – 23 March 1757)
- Mother: Queen Heongyeong (헌경왕후), of the Pungsan Hong clan (풍산 홍씨; 6 August 1735 – 1 January 1816)
  - Grandfather: Hong Bong-han (홍봉한), Internal Prince Yeongpung (영풍부원군; 1713–1778)
  - Grandmother: Internal Princess Consort Hansan (한산부부인), of the Hansan Yi clan (한산 이씨; 1713–1755)

== Ancestry ==
Ancestors of Crown Prince Uiso

King Hyeonjong (현종대왕)
King Sukjong (숙종대왕)
Queen Myeongseong, of the Cheongpung Kim clan (명성왕후 청풍 김씨)
King Yeongjo (영조대왕)
Choe Hyo-won (최효원)
Concubine Suk, of the Haeju Choe clan (숙빈 해주 최씨)
Lady, of the Namyang Hong clan (남양 홍씨)
King Jangjo (장조대왕)
Yi Yeong-im (이영임)
Yi Yu-beon (이유번)
Concubine Yeong, of the Jeonui Yi clan (영빈 전의 이씨)
Kim U-jong (김우종)
Lady, of the Hanyang Kim clan (한양 김씨)
Lady, of the Jeonju Yi clan (전주 이씨)
Crown Prince Uiso
Hong Jung-gi (홍중기)
Hong Hyeon-bo (홍현보)
Lady, of the Jeonju Yi clan (전주 이씨)
Hong Bong-han, Internal Prince Yeongpung (영풍부원군 홍봉한)
Im Bang (임방)
Lady, of the Pungcheon Im clan (풍천 임씨)
Queen Heongyeong, of the Pungsan Hong clan (헌경왕후 풍산 홍씨)
Yi Jib (이집)
Internal Princess Consort Hansan, of the Hansan Yi clan (한산부부인 한산 이씨)
Yu Heon (유헌)
Lady, of the Gigye Yu clan (기계 유씨)

== See also ==
- History of Korea
- Styles and titles in Joseon
