= Princess Hwapyeong =

Korean princess (1727–1748)

Princess Hwapyeong 화평옹주
- Princess of Joseon
- Born: 5 June 1727
- Died: 8 July 1748 (aged 21)
- Spouse: Park Myeong-won, Prince Consort Geumseong (m.1738–1748)
- Issue: Park Sang-cheol (adopted son)
- Clan: Jeonju Yi clan (by birth); Bannam Park clan (by marriage)
- Dynasty: Jeonju Yi
- Father: Yeongjo of Joseon
- Mother: Royal Noble Consort Yeong of the Jeonui Lee clan
- Religion: Korean Buddhism

- Princess Hwapyeong
- Hangul: 화평옹주
- Hanja: 和平翁主
- RR: Hwapyeong ongju
- MR: Hwap'yŏng ongju

Princess Hwapyeong (Korean: 화평옹주; Hanja: 和平翁主; 5 June 1727 – 8 July 1748) was the eldest daughter of King Yeongjo of Joseon and Royal Noble Consort Yeong of the Jeonui Lee clan, and Yeongjo's third daughter overall.

== Biography ==
Her personal name is unknown. She was born to Royal Noble Consort Yeong of the Jeonui Yi clan on April 27, 1727, in Jippok Hall Changgyeonggung.

In 1731, she received the title Hwapyeong, which means "peace".

In 1738, the 14th year of King Yeongjo's reign, she married Park Myeong-won (1725–1790), fourth son of Park Sa-jeong (1683–1739), from the Bannam Park clan. On February 20, 1742, she left the palace and moved to her in-law's residence.

Princess Hwapyeong's wedding was extremely grand, and her dowry was allegedly ten thousand times more extravagant than that of her elder sister, Princess Hwasun's. As a wedding gift, the King bestowed upon her the Ihyeon Palace, but she declined the gift.

She left no surviving children of her own, but King Yeongjo made the third son of Park Myeong-won's eldest brother her adopted son.

In her memoirs, Princess Hwapyeong's sister-in-law, Lady Hyegyŏng, described the Princess as being gentle and particularly kind towards her and Crown Prince Sado.

The Princess was uncomfortable and distressed by the fact that she alone was showered with paternal affection and that her younger brother, Crown Prince Sado, was not. Whenever King Yeongjo found fault in Sado, Princess Hwapyeong would side with her brother and pleaded ceaselessly with the King to be lenient. She was the main protector of Crown Prince Sado and is said to have eased the relationship between her father and the Prince in favor of her brother.

Princess Hwapyeong died during childbirth on June 24, 1748. Her father King Yeongjo hastily visited her residence and was informed that nothing could be done. The King was devastated and inconsolable. He suspended all court affairs to mourn for her and even moved his residence from Gyeonghuigung to Changdeokgung, in order to be near the location of the funerary observance. He visited her residence frequently and broke down on five occasions before Princess Hwapyeong's burial. King Yeongjo made great efforts in seizing the most auspicious location for the burial ground of his daughter. He forcefully acquired a piece of ancestral land owned by the Paju Yun family, who had been staying there for generations, and evacuated hundreds of civilians from nearby villages to make way for Princess Hwapyeong's tomb.

Princess Hwapyeong was buried in Munsan Village, Paju, Gyeonggi Province. Her elaborated funeral proceedings were comparable to that of a State Funeral.

Lady Hyegyŏng claimed that during her first pregnancy she often dreamt of Princess Hwapyeong coming to her bedchamber, sitting next to her and sometimes smiling at her. When her first son was born, he bore the same birthmark as Princess Hwapyeong, and King Yeongjo took him as the reincarnation of the Princess.

== Ancestry ==
Ancestors of Crown Prince Sado

16. King Hyojong
8. King Hyeonjong
17. Queen Inseon of the Deoksu Jang clan
4. King Sukjong
18. Kim Woo-myeong
9. Queen Myeongseong of the Cheongpung Kim clan
19. Lady Song of the Eunjin Song clan
2. King Yeongjo
20. Choe Tae-il
10. Choe Hyo-won
21. Lady Jang of the Pyeonggang Jang clan
5. Royal Noble Consort Suk of the Haeju Choe clan
22. Hong Gye-nam
11. Lady Hong of the Namyang Hong clan
23. Lady Kim of the Gangneung Kim clan
1. Princess Hwapyeong
6. Yi Yu-beon
3. Royal Noble Consort Yeong of the Jeonui Yi clan
7. Lady Kim of the Hanyang Kim clan

=== Family ===
- Father
  - King Yeongjo of Joseon (31 October 1694 – 22 April 1776)
- Mother
  - Legal mother: Queen Jeongseong of the Daegu Seo clan (12 January 1693 – 3 April 1757)
  - Biological mother: Royal Noble Consort Yeong of the Jeonui Lee clan (15 August 1696 – 23 August 1764)
- Sibling(s)
  - Unnamed sister (8 March 1728 – 18 February 1731)
  - Unnamed sister (12 December 1729 – 21 March 1731)
  - Unnamed sister (1 January 1732 – 12 April 1736)
  - Sister: Princess Hwahyeop (1733–1752)
  - Brother: Crown Prince Sado (13 February 1735 – 12 July 1762)
  - Sister: Princess Hwawan (9 March 1738 – May 1808)
- Husband: Park Myeong-won, Prince Consort Geumseong (1725–1770)
- Adoptive son: Park Sang-cheol (1737–1761)
