= Princess Hwayu =

Korean princess (1740–1777)

Princess Hwayu 화유옹주
- Princess of Joseon
- Born: 29 September 1740; Joseon
- Died: 21 May 1777 (aged 36); Joseon
- Burial: Bucheon, Gyeonggi Province, Seoul
- Spouse: Hwang In-jeon, Lord Changseong (m.1753–1777)
- Issue: Hwang Ki-ok; Lady Hwang
- Clan: Jeonju Yi clan (by birth); Changwon Hwang clan (by marriage)
- Dynasty: House of Yi
- Father: Yeongjo of Joseon
- Mother: Royal Consort Gwi-in of the Pungyang Jo clan
- Religion: Korean Buddhism

Princess Hwayu (Korean: 화유옹주; Hanja: 和柔翁主; 29 September 1740 – 21 May 1777 (Note: Lunar calendar dates)), was a royal princess of the Joseon Dynasty and the tenth daughter of Yeongjo of Joseon.

== Biography ==
Princess Hwayu was born on 29 September 1740 as the second and youngest daughter of King Yeongjo and his concubine, Royal Consort Gwi-in of the Pungyang Jo clan. Her personal name was not recorded in history. She received the title Hwayu in 1746.

On 5 December 1752, the marriage between Princess Hwayu and Hwang In-jeon was decided, but the ceremony was stopped because of the death of Princess Hwahyeop.

On February 27, 1753 (29th year of King Yeongjo), she married Hwang In-jeon. After the wedding, King Yeongjo continued to visit the residence of Princess Hwayu.

Princess Hwayu and her eldest son suffered from boils, but the latter survived. She later died on 21 May 1777, lunar calendar, and was buried with her husband in Bucheon.

== Family ==
- Father - Yi Geum, King Yeongjo of Joseon (31 October 1694 – 22 April 1776)
- Mother
  - Biological - Royal Consort Gwi-in of the Pungyang Jo clan (29 October 1707 – 21 October 1780)
  - Legal - Queen Jeongseong of the Daegu Seo clan (2 January 1693 – 23 March 1757)
- Sibling(s)
  - Unnamed older sister (19 September 1735 – 3 September 1736)
- Husband - Hwang In-jeom, Prince Consort Changseong (창성위 황인점; 昌城尉 黃仁點; 1732–1802)
- Issue
  - Son - Hwang Gi-ok (황기옥; 黃基玉; 1756–1794)
  - Daughter - Lady Hwang of the Changwon Hwang clan (창원 황씨; 昌原 黃氏; 1759–?)
  - Adoptive daughter - Lady Hwang of the Changwon Hwang clan (창원 황씨; 昌原 黃氏; 1801–1827)
