= Princess Hwaryeong =

Princess of Joseon (1753–1821)

Princess Hwaryeong 화령옹주
- Princess of Joseon
- Born: 1753; Joseon
- Died: 1821 (aged 67–68); Joseon
- Burial: Princess Hwaryeongjumyo, Nowon District, Seoul
- Spouse: Sim Neung-geon, Lord Cheongseong (m.1764–d.1817)
- Issue: Sim Ui-Jang; Sim Ui-gwan; Lady Sim of the Cheongsong Sim clan Lady Sim of the Cheongsong Sim clan
- Clan: Jeonju Yi clan (by birth); Cheongsong Sim clan (by marriage)
- Dynasty: House of Yi
- Father: Yeongjo of Joseon
- Mother: Royal Consort Suk-ui of the Nampyeong Moon clan
- Religion: Korean Buddhism

Princess Hwaryeong (Korean: 화령옹주; 2 March 1753 – 3 September 1821 (Note: These are lunar dates.)) was a royal princess of the Joseon Dynasty and the eleventh daughter of Yeongjo of Joseon.

== Biography ==
Princess Hwaryeong was born on 2 March 1753 as the eleventh daughter of King Yeongjo and Royal Consort Suk-ui of the Nampyeong Moon clan. She was the younger half-sister of Crown Prince Sado.

In 1762, her mother was one of the accomplices who worked with Kim Sang-ro to kill Crown Prince Sado. At that time, it is recorded that many people were aware of this aspect of the royal consort, but only Yeongjo did not know this and lamented the failure to punish her. Royal Consort Suk-ui's involvement would later backfire.

In 1764, at the age of 12, Princess Hwaryeong married the 13-year-old Sim Neung-geon. After the ceremony, Sim Neung-geon was awarded the title of Lord Cheongseong (청성위). This marriage produce 2 sons and 2 daughters; with one son who died young.

In 1776, the year King Jeongjo ascended the throne, Royal Consort Suk-ui's title was revoked as the king found out about her involvement in his father's death as well as expelling her from the palace. The king also made the royal consort's older brother, Moon Seung-guk, a slave and sent her mother be a servant on Jeju Island.

On 13 May 1776, lunar calendar, Lady Moon was kicked out of the city and thus deposing her of her position as concubine. After this incident, officials also opted to revoked Princess Hwaryeong's and Princess Hwagil's titles as they were the daughters of the Royal Consort Suk-ui. But Jeongjo dismissed the concerns regarding his aunts as they weren't responsible for the sins of their mother.

On 10 August 1776, lunar calendar, King Jeongjo gave orders to keep watch on the Royal Consort.

In 1781, Princess Hwaryeong's husband was impeached because he disposed Lady Moon's property while she was alive, and was soon removed from office.

Princess Hwaryeong died on September 3 of the lunar calendar in 1821 (the 21st year of King Sunjo) at the age of 68. King Sunjo ordered for a funeral to be done for his grandaunt and is buried in Nowon, Seoul.

== Family ==
- Father - Yi Geum, King Yeongjo (조선 영조; 31 October 1694 – 22 April 1776)
  - Grandfather - Yi Sun, King Sukjong (숙종대왕; 7 October 1661 – 12 July 1720)
  - Grandmother - Royal Noble Consort Suk of the Haeju Choi clan (숙빈 최씨; 淑嬪 崔氏; 17 December 1670 – 9 April 1718)
- Mother - Deposed Royal Consort Suk-ui of the Nampyeong Moon clan (숙의 문씨; 1735–1776)
  - Uncle - Moon Seong-guk (문성국; 文聖國)
- Sibling(s)
  - Younger sister - Princess Hwagil (화길옹주; 1754–1772)
    - Brother-in-law - Gu Min-hwa, Lord Neungseong (구민화 능성위) of the Neungseong Gu clan (1742–1800)
      - Niece - Lady Gu of the Neungseong Gu clan (능성 구씨; 1769–1832)
        - Nephew-in-law - Kim Yi-cho (김이초; 金履初; 1769–1829)
      - Nephew - Gu Myeong-hui (구명희; 具命喜; 1772–?)
      - Niece - Lady Gu of the Neungseong Gu clan (능성 구씨; 1772–1792)
        - Nephew-in-law - Yun Yeong-myeong (윤영명; 尹永明; 1769–1815)
- Husband - Sim Neung-geon, Lord Cheongseong (심능건 청성위) of the Cheongsong Sim clan (1752 – 7 July 1817)
  - Father-in-law - Sim Jeong-ji (심정지; 沈鼎之; 1722–1791)
  - Mother-in-law - Lady Yi of the Deoksu Yi clan (증 정경부인 덕수 이씨; 1723–1768)
- Issue
  - Son - Sim Ui-jang (심의장; 沈宜長; 1774–1779)
  - Son - Sim Ui-gwan (심의관; 沈宜寬; 1779–?)
  - Daughter - Lady Sim of the Cheongsong Sim clan (청송 심씨)
    - Son-in-law - Yi Gyu-shin (이규신; 李奎信)
  - Daughter - Lady Sim of the Cheongsong Sim clan (청송 심씨)
    - Son-in-law - Yi Jae-gyo (이재교; 李在敎)
