= Queen Hyosun =

Crown princess of Joseon (1716–1751)

Queen Hyosun 효순왕후
- Queen consort of Joseon (posthumously honored)

Crown Princess of Joseon
- Tenure: 1727 – 16 November 1728
- Predecessor: Crown Princess Seo
- Successor: Crown Princess Hye
- Born: 8 January 1716; Dongbu, Sunggyu-bang, Hanseong, Joseon
- Died: 30 December 1751 (aged 35); Uichunhyeon, Geongeuk Hall, Changdeokgung, Hanseong, Joseon
- Burial: Yeongreung, 89 Samreung-ro, Jori-eup, Paju, Gyeonggi Province
- Spouse: Crown Prince Hyojang (m.1727–1728)
- Issue: King Jeongjo of Joseon (adopted)
Posthumous name
- 효순현빈→효순왕후→효순소황후 孝純賢嬪→孝純王后→孝純昭皇后
- House: Pungyang Jo (by birth) Jeonju Yi (by marriage)
- Father: Jo Mun-myeong
- Mother: Internal Princess Consort Wangheung of the Jeonju Yi clan

Korean name
- Hangul: 효순왕후
- Hanja: 孝純王后
- RR: Hyosun wanghu
- MR: Hyosun wanghu

Queen Hyosun (Korean: 효순왕후 조씨; 8 January 1716 – 30 December 1751), of the Pungyang Jo clan, was the crown princess of Joseon. She was never known by the title queen during her lifetime. Both Hyosun and her husband were posthumously made the adoptive parents of the future King Jeongjo in 1764, in an attempt to distance the boy from the crimes of his birth father, Crown Prince Sado. She was posthumously called as Hyosun, the Bright Empress (효순소황후; 孝純昭皇后).

== Biography ==
Lady Jo was born into the Pungyang Jo clan during King Sukjong's 14th year of reign as the only daughter and second child of Jo Mun-myeong, a government official aligned with the Soron faction, and his second wife, Lady Yi of the Jeonju Yi clan, the royal house of Joseon. Through her paternal grandmother, Lady Jo was a first cousin removed of Queen Ingyeong; the first wife of her father-in-law's father, King Sukjong.

Through a selection process, the 11-year-old Lady Jo was chosen to become the crown princess in 1727 and married the 8-year-old Crown Prince Hyojang that same year. On such occasion, her father-in-law, King Yeongjo, gifted her a book of instructions that he had written.

On 16 December 1728, Hyosun's husband died of an unknown illness when she was 12 years old. Despite this happening, she was still given the title of Hyeonbin or Crown Princess Consort Hyeon (현빈; 賢嬪) in 1735.

Eventually in 1744, Lady Jo was given the title of Lady Hyeonbin (현빈궁, 賢嬪宮; lit. Hyeonbin Palace) as she was no longer the crown princess consort through her marriage. Despite being widowed, she remained in the palace and reportedly developed a good relationship with the wife of the new crown prince, Crown Princess Consort Hye.

It is also said that King Yeongjo had favored and seen Hyosun as another daughter like Princess Hwapyeong. Outliving her husband by 23 years, Hyosun later died at the age of 35 in the winter on 30 December 1751. King Yeongjo, who was reportedly deeply saddened by her death, led the mourning rites.

== Posthumous treatment ==
Hyosun was initially granted the posthumous title of Hyosun, the Virtuous Crown Princess Consort (효순현빈) and venerated in the same temple as her deceased husband. Her brother-in-law, Crown Prince Sado, was killed in 1762 for his actions which prompted Yeongjo to issue a decree that made Hyosun and Hyojang the adoptive parents of Sado's eldest son; in a move seen as an attempt to preserve the boy's legitimacy as an heir. The year of King Jeongjo's succession in 1776, the princess consort thus received the posthumous title of Queen Hyosun (효순왕후) with her husband receiving King Jinjong as his posthumous title.

After 157 years, Queen Hyosun was granted the title of Hyosun, the Bright Empress (효순소황후) in 1908 when Emperor Sunjong succeeded to the throne.

== Family ==
- Father
  - Jo Mun-myeong (조문명; 趙景命; 1680–1732)
- Mother
  - Step - Internal Princess Consort Hwawon of the Andong Kim clan (화원부부인 안동 김씨; 花原府夫人 安東 金氏; 1681 – 19 August 1710); first wife of Jo Mun-myeong
  - Biological - Internal Princess Consort Wanheung of the Jeonju Yi clan (완흥부부인 전주 이씨; 完興府夫人 全州 李氏; 1693–1734); second wife of Jo Mun-myeong
- Siblings
  - Older half-brother - Jo Jae-ho (조재호; 趙載浩; 1702–1762)
  - Older half-brother - Jo Jae-yeon (조재연; 趙載淵; 1709–1750)
  - Older brother - Jo Jae-hong (조재홍; 趙載洪; 1713–1758)
  - Younger brother - Jo Jae-deuk (조재득; 趙載得; 1720–1776)
- Husband
  - Yi Haeng, King Jinjong (진종 조선; 4 April 1719 – 16 December 1728) — No issue.
- Issue
  - Adoptive son - Yi San, King Jeongjo of Joseon (정조 조선; 28 October 1752 – 18 August 1800)
