= Consort Yeong =

Consort Yeong may refer to:

- Royal Consort Yeong-Bi of the Dongju Choi clan (died after 1389), concubine of Wang U
- Royal Noble Consort Yeongbin Yi (1696—1764), concubine of Yeongjo of Joseon
