= Yeongjo of Joseon =

King of Joseon from 1724 to 1776

Yeongjo
- Reproduction of a state portrait from 1744, c. 1900

King of Joseon
- Reign: 11 October 1724 – 22 April 1776
- Enthronement: 16 October 1724; Injeongjeon, Changdeokgung
- Predecessor: Gyeongjong
- Successor: Jeongjo
- Regent: Crown Prince Seon (1749–1762); Grand Heir San (1776)

Crown Prince (Note: Korean: 왕세제; Hanja: 王世弟; Wangseje; lit. ''Royal Heir Brother''; this is the only instance of the title being used, as opposed to the usual "Royal Heir Son" (왕세자; 王世子; Wangseja).) of Joseon
- Tenure: 15 November 1721 – 11 October 1724
- Born: 31 October 1694; Bogyeongdang, Changdeokgung, Hanseong, Joseon
- Died: 22 April 1776 (aged 81); Jipgyeongdang, Gyeonghuigung, Hanseong, Joseon
- Burial: Wolleung, Donggureung Cluster, Guri, South Korea
- Spouses: Queen Jeongseong (m. 1704; died 1757) Queen Jeongsun (m. 1759)
- Issue Detail: Crown Prince Hyojang; Princess Hwapyeong; Princess Hwahyeop; Crown Prince Sado; Princess Hwawan; Princess Hwayu; Princess Hwaryeong
Names
- Yi Geum (이금; 李昑)
Era dates
- Adopted the era name of the Qing dynasty (Note: Ongjeong (Yongzheng) (옹정; 雍正): 1724–1735 Geollyung (Qianlong) (건륭; 乾隆): 1736–1776)
Regnal name
- Jihaeng Sundeok Yeongmo Uiyeol Jangui Hongryun Gwangin Donhui Checheon Geongeuk Seonggong Sinhwa Daeseong Gwangun Gaetae Giyeong Yomyeong Suncheol Geongeon Gonyeong Baemyeong Sutong Gyeongryeok Honghyu Junghwa Yungdo Sukjang Changhun (지행순덕영모의열장의홍륜광인돈희체천건극성공신화대성광운개태기영요명순철건건곤영배명수통경력홍휴중화융도숙장창훈; 至行純德英謨毅烈章義洪倫光仁敦禧體天建極聖功神化大成廣運開泰基永堯明舜哲乾健坤寧配命垂統景曆洪休中和隆道肅莊彰勳) (Note: Known as honorific name (존호; 尊號) in the Sinosphere, its closest equivalent in the English-speaking world is the regnal name.)
Posthumous name
- Joseon: Great King Jangsun Igmun (Note: Later changed to "Jeongmun" (정문; 正文).) Seonmu Huigyeong Hyeonhyo (장순익문선무희경현효대왕; 莊順翼文宣武熙敬顯孝大王); Qing dynasty: Jangsun (장순; 莊順)
Temple name
- Yeongjong (영종; 英宗) → Yeongjo (영조; 英祖) (Note: Conferred in 1776 and 1889, respectively.)
- Clan: Jeonju Yi
- Dynasty: Yi
- Father: King Sukjong
- Mother: Concubine Suk (biological); Queen Inwon (adoptive)
- Religion: Confucianism (Neo-Confucianism)

Korean name
- Hangul: 영조
- Hanja: 英祖
- Lit.: "Brilliant Progenitor"
- RR: Yeongjo
- MR: Yŏngjo

Royal title
- Hangul: 연잉군
- Hanja: 延礽君
- RR: Yeoninggun
- MR: Yŏninggun

Art name
- Hangul: 양성헌
- Hanja: 養性軒
- RR: Yangseongheon
- MR: Yangsŏnghŏn

Courtesy name
- Hangul: 광숙
- Hanja: 光叔
- RR: Gwangsuk
- MR: Kwangsuk

Yeongjo (Korean: 영조; Hanja: 英祖; 31 October 1694 – 22 April 1776), (Note: In the Korean calendar (lunisolar), he was born on the 13th day of the 9th lunar month and died on the fifth day of the third lunar month.) personal name Yi Geum, was the 21st monarch of Joseon. The second son of King Sukjong, he acceded to the throne upon the death of his elder half-brother, King Gyeongjong. His life was characterized by political infighting and resentment due to his biological mother's low-born origins.

Yeongjo is most remembered for his reform of the taxation system, and persistent efforts to reconcile the various political factions through his Tangpyeong policy (탕평책; 蕩平策; lit. ''Policy of Magnificent Harmony''), which focused on keeping a strict numerical balance of officials from opposing factions in key government offices. His reign of nearly 52 years was also marked by the highly contentious execution of his only surviving son, Crown Prince Sado, in 1762. However, in spite of this controversy, Yeongjo has earned a positive reputation in Korean history.

== Biography ==
=== Succession to the throne ===
In 1720, King Sukjong died and Crown Prince Yi Yun, Sukjong's eldest son, ascended to the throne as King Gyeongjong, at the age of 33. Before he died in 1720, Sukjong supposedly told Yi I-myeong to name Prince Yeoning as Gyeongjong's heir, but in the absence of a historiographer or scribe, no record exists. At this time, the Noron faction unsuccessfully tried to pressure the new king to step down in favor of his younger half-brother.

A few months after Gyeongjong's enthronement, Prince Yeoning was installed as Crown Prince Brother (Wangseje; 왕세제, 王世弟). This aggravated the power struggle and led to the Shinim literati purge of 1721. The Noron sent petitions to the king to no effect while the opposing Soron faction used this to their advantage — claiming the Noron were trying to usurp power and subsequently getting their rival faction removed from several offices.

Members of the Soron faction then came up with a plan to assassinate Yeoning under the pretence of hunting for a white fox said to be haunting the palace, but he sought shelter with his adoptive mother, Queen Dowager Hyesun. Afterwards, he told the king that he would rather go and live as a commoner.

On 11 October 1724, King Gyeongjong died. The Soron accused Yeoning of being involved in his brother's death due to the earlier attempt of the Noron faction to have him placed on the throne. Many historians, however, now believe that he could have died from food poisoning caused by contaminated seafood, as he displayed symptoms of the illness. Homer Hulbert described this in his book The History of Korea, where he said, "But we may well doubt the truth of the rumor, for nothing that is told of that brother indicates that he would commit such an act, and in the second place a man who will eat shrimps in mid-summer, that have been brought 30 miles from the sea without ice might expect to die". On 16 October 1724, Prince Yeoning ascended the throne as King Yeongjo, the 21st ruler of Joseon.

=== Reign ===
He was a deeply Confucian monarch, and is said to have had a greater knowledge of the classics than his officials. During the reigns of Yeongjo and his grandson Jeongjo, Confucianization was at its height, as well as the economic recovery from the wars of the late 16th and early 17th centuries. His reign was referred to by American missionary Homer Hulbert as "one of the most brilliant" in Joseon's history.

Yeongjo worried deeply for his people. The Annals of the Joseon dynasty record that one day in the 4th year of his reign, King Yeongjo woke up to the sound of early morning rain and said to his courtiers:

Oh dear! We have had flood, drought and famines for the past four years because of my lack of virtue, and this year we even went through an unprecedented revolt by a traitor named Yi In-jwa. How can my poor people manage their livelihood under such hardship? There is an old saying, 'War is always followed by a lean year'. Fortunately, however, we haven't had a big famine for the past two years and we pin our hopes on a good harvest this year. Yet I am still nervous because, while the season for harvesting is around the corner, there is no way of knowing if there will be a flood or drought before then. Nobody knows whether a cold rain will pour suddenly and flood the fields awaiting harvest. My lack of goodness might bring upon us such awful things as I fail to win the sympathy of heaven. How can I earn the sympathy of heavens if I do not self-reflect and make efforts myself? I should start with reflecting on myself.

As he worried that rain would ruin the harvest and force his unfortunate people to starve, the king ordered his courtiers to reduce the taxes and decrease the number of dishes in his own meals.

One early morning 25 years later (1753), the continuous rain reminded Yeongjo of the flood during the fourth year of his reign, when he had eaten less food:

Oh! Floods and droughts really happen because I lack virtue. I am much older than that year, but how can my compassion for the people and will to work hard for them be less than back then?".

Yet again, he ordered a reduction in the number of dishes on his dining table.

People around him described him as an articulate, bright, benevolent and kind monarch. He was penetrating in observation and quick of comprehension.

=== Yi In-jwa's Rebellion ===
After the ascension of King Yeongjo to the throne, the position of the Noron faction was restored, and a coalition of the radical faction of the Namin and the excluded Soron faction instigated Yi In-jwa's Rebellion under the pretext of protecting King Gyeongjong. Yeongjo pursued a policy of equal recruitment, believing that factional strife was detrimental to the country's development. In response, the radical faction of the Soron group justified their rebellion by raising suspicions about the circumstances of King Gyeongjong's death and claiming that King Yeongjo was not the legitimate heir of King Sukjong, thereby securing their power. The rebellion began on March 15 when their leader, Yi In-jwa captured Cheongju Castle. The rebel forces, marching toward Hanyang (present-day Seoul), were defeated by the royal army, and the support from the Yeong and Honam regions was also suppressed by local forces, leading to the suppression of the rebellion and execution of Yi In-jwa and his family.

=== Policies ===
Realising the detrimental effect on state administration of the factional strife, Yeongjo attempted to end it as soon as he ascended the throne. He reinstated the short-lived universal military service tax, and then went beyond the palace gates to solicit the opinions of officials, literati (scholars), soldiers and peasants. Yeongjo reduced the military service tax by half and ordered the variance be supplemented by taxes on fisheries, salt, vessels and an additional land tax. He also regularized the financial system of state revenues and expenses by adopting an accounting system. His pragmatic policies allowed payment of taxes on grain from the remote mountainous areas Gyeongsang Province, to the nearby port, with payment in cotton or cash for grain. The circulation of currency was encouraged by increasing coin casting.

Yeongjo's concern for improvement of the peasant's life was manifest in his eagerness to educate the people by distributing important books in the Korean script (Hangul), including the Book of Agriculture.

The pluviometer was again manufactured in quantity and distributed to local administration offices and extensive public work projects were undertaken. Yeongjo upgraded the status of posterity of the commoners, opening another possibility for upward social mobility and inevitable change. His policies were intended to reassert the Confucian monarchy and a humanistic rule, but they were unable to stem the tide of social change that resulted.

Mercantile activities rapidly increased in volume. The accumulation of capital through monopoly and wholesales expanded through guild organisations and many merchants were centred in Hanseong. The traditional division of government chartered shop, the license tribute goods suppliers and the small shopkeepers in the alley and streets were integrated and woven into a monopoly and wholesale system.

Regardless of status, many yangban aristocrats and commoners engaged in some kind of merchant activities. Thus Hanseong made great strides as a commercial and industrial city and hub in the 18th century. The popular demand for handicrafts and goods such as knives, mane hats, dining tables and brassware was ever-increasing. Restrictions on wearing the mane hat originally denoting yangban status, virtually disappeared.

Even bootlegging of books became commercialised as competition developed among the well-to-do yangban who engaged in the publication of collected literary works by their renowned ancestors. This also led to printing popular fiction and poetry. The people especially appreciated satire and social criticism. One example is the Chunhyangjeon (Tales of Chunghyang) about the fidelity of the gisaeng's daughter, which was widely read as a satire aimed to expose the greed and snobbery of government officials.

==== Anti-corruption ====
The King is also renowned for having treasured Park Mun-su, whom he appointed as secret royal inspector (Amhaengeosa; 암행어사). Park, who had earned great merit in putting down Yi In-jwa's rebellion in 1728, went around the nation arresting corrupt local officers in the name of the King.

==== Catholicism ====
Yeongjo was the first king to take action against Roman Catholic activities in the country. By the 18th century, Catholicism was beginning to acquire a following especially in the Gangwon and Hwanghae provinces. In 1758, Yeongjo officially outlawed Catholicism as an evil practice.

=== Crown Prince Sado ===
The only significantly dismal incident during Yeongjo's reign was the death of his son, Crown Prince Sado. History indicates Sado suffered from mental illness, randomly killing people in the palace and raping palace maids. Because Yeongjo could not execute his son without also implicating his daughter-in-law and grandson, he ordered Sado to climb into a wooden rice chest on a hot July day in 1762. After two days, King Yeongjo had the chest containing Sado tied with rope, covered with grass, and moved to the upper palace. Sado responded from inside the chest until the night of the seventh day; the chest was opened and he was pronounced dead on the eighth day. During the 19th century, there were rumors that Crown Prince Sado had not been mentally ill, but had been victimised by a court plot. This, however, is contradicted by both the memoirs written by Sado's widow and the Annals of the Joseon Dynasty.

As a means to preserve the legitimacy of Sado's son as his own heir, Yeongjo decreed that the boy be registered as the son of the deceased Crown Prince Hyojang and Crown Princess Consort Hyosun.

=== Death ===
Yeongjo had lived with poor health for much of his life, and was even infected with parasitic worms. Because of this, he took many precautions to stay healthy, which some speculate may have contributed to his death at a relatively old age.

Fourteen years after Crown Prince Sado's death, his son and Yeongjo's grandson, Yi San (posthumously King Jeongjo), became King. The early part of the new King's years were marked by political intrigues and fear of court officials who were afraid that he would seek revenge on them for petitioning the punishment that caused the death of his father, Crown Prince Sado.

Yeongjo is buried with his second wife, Queen Jeongsun, in the royal tomb of Wonneung (원릉; 元陵) in Guri, Gyeonggi Province.

== Family ==
- Father: King Sukjong (숙종대왕; 7 October 1661 – 12 July 1720)
  - Grandfather: King Hyeonjong (현종대왕; 14 March 1641 – 17 September 1674)
  - Grandmother: Queen Myeongseong (명성왕후), of the Cheongpung Kim clan (청풍 김씨; 3 June 1642 – 11 January 1684)
- Biological mother: Concubine Suk (숙빈), of the Haeju Choe clan (해주 최씨; 17 December 1670 – 9 April 1718)
  - Grandfather: Choe Hyo-won (최효원; 1638–1672)
  - Grandmother: Lady, of the Namyang Hong clan (남양 홍씨; 1639–1673)
- Adoptive mother: Queen Inwon (인원왕후), of the Gyeongju Kim clan (경주 김씨; 3 November 1687 – 13 May 1757)

Consort(s) and their respective issue

- Queen Jeongseong (정성왕후), of the Daegu Seo clan (대구 서씨; 2 January 1693 – 23 March 1757)
- Queen Jeongsun (정순왕후), of the Gyeongju Kim clan (경주 김씨; 2 December 1745 – 11 February 1805)
- Concubine Jeong (정빈), of the Hamyang Yi clan (함양 이씨; 1694 – 23 December 1721)
  - Princess Hwaeok (화억옹주; 1 June 1717 – 7 May 1718), given name Hyang-yeom (향염), first daughter
  - Yi Haeng (이행), Crown Prince Hyojang (효장세자; 4 April 1719 – 16 December 1728), first son
  - Princess Hwasun (화순옹주; 1720 – 24 February 1758), given name Hyang-yi (향이), second daughter
- Concubine Yeong (영빈), of the Jeonui Yi clan (전의 이씨; 5 August 1696 – 12 August 1764)
  - Princess Hwapyeong (화평옹주; 16 June 1727 – 19 July 1748), third daughter
  - Unnamed daughter (1728–1731)
  - Unnamed daughter (1729–1731)
  - Unnamed daughter (1732–1736)
  - Princess Hwahyeop (화협옹주; 20 April 1733 – 1 January 1753), fourth daughter
  - Yi Seon (이선), Crown Prince Sado (사도세자; 13 February 1735 – 12 July 1762), second son
  - Princess Hwawan (화완옹주; 9 March 1738 – May 1808), given name Yong-wan (용완), fifth daughter
- Gwiin (귀인), of the Pungyang Jo clan (풍양 조씨; 29 October 1707 – 21 October 1780)
  - Unnamed daughter (1735–1736)
  - Princess Hwayu (화유옹주; 18 November 1740 – 25 June 1777), sixth daughter
- Sugui (숙의), of the Mun clan (문씨; ? – 11 September 1776) (Note: Stripped of her rank and exiled, then executed following the end of Yeongjo's mourning period; known as the "Mun woman" (문녀) during that interval.)
  - Princess Hwaryeong (화령옹주; 5 April 1753 – 28 September 1821), seventh daughter
  - Princess Hwagil (화길옹주; 8 July 1754 – 10 January 1773), eighth daughter
- Palace Lady (상궁), of the Yi clan (이씨) (Note: Sanggung (상궁; 尚宫); female official of the senior fifth rank in the internal court.)

== Ancestry ==
Ancestors of Yeongjo of Joseon

King Injo (인조대왕)
King Hyojong (효종대왕)
Queen Inyeol, of the Cheongju Han clan (인렬왕후 청주 한씨)
King Hyeonjong (현종대왕)
Jang Yu, Internal Prince Sinpung (신풍부원군 장유)
Queen Inseon, of the Deoksu Jang clan (인선왕후 덕수 장씨)
Internal Princess Consort Yeongga, of the (new) Andong Kim clan (영가부부인 신 안동 김씨)
King Sukjong (숙종대왕)
Kim Yuk (김육)
Kim U-myeong, Internal Prince Cheongpung (청풍부원군 김우명)
Lady, of the Papyeong Yun clan (파평 윤씨)
Queen Myeongseong, of the Cheongpung Kim clan (명성왕후 청풍 김씨)
Song Gu-taek (송국택)
Internal Princess Consort Deokeun, of the Eunjin Song clan (덕은부부인 은진 송씨)
Lady, of the Jinju Gang clan (진주 강씨)
King Yeongjo
Choe Mal-jeong (최말정)
Choe Tae-il (최태일)
Lady, of the Pyonggang Jang clan (평강 장씨)
Choe Hyo-won (최효원)
Jang Won (장원)
Lady, of the Pyonggang Jang clan (평강 장씨)
Concubine Suk, of the Haeju Choe clan (숙빈 해주 최씨)
Hong In-baek (홍인백)
Hong Gye-nam (홍계남)
Lady, of the Gimhwa Kim clan (김화 김씨)
Lady, of the Namyang Hong clan (남양 홍씨)
Kim Dae-bong (김대봉)
Lady, of the Gangneung Kim clan (강릉 김씨)

== In popular culture ==
- Portrayed by Kim Sung-won in the 1988 MBC TV series 500 Years of Joseon: The Memoirs of Lady Hyegyeong.
- Portrayed by Park Geun-hyung in the 1998 MBC TV series The King's Road.
- Portrayed by Choi Bool-am in the 1998 MBC TV series Hong Guk Young.
- Portrayed by Jo Min-ki in the 2002 MBC TV series Inspector Park Moon So.
- Portrayed by Lee Tae-ri in the 2002–2003 KBS2 TV series Royal Story: Jang Hui-bin.
- Portrayed by Kim Sung-gyum in the 2007 CGV TV series Eight Days, Assassination Attempts against King Jeongjo.
- Portrayed by Lee Soon-jae in the 2007 MBC TV series Lee San, Wind of the Palace.
- Portrayed by Lee Hyung-suk and Lee Seon-ho in the 2010 MBC TV series Dong Yi.
- Portrayed by Jeon Gook-hwan in the 2011 SBS TV series Warrior Baek Dong-soo.
- Portrayed by Han Suk-kyu in the 2014 SBS TV series Secret Door.
- Portrayed by Yoo Yeon-seok in the 2014 film The Royal Tailor.
- Portrayed by Song Kang-ho in the 2015 film The Throne.
- Portrayed by Yeo Jin-goo in the 2016 SBS TV series The Royal Gambler.
- Portrayed by Ryu Tae-joon in the 2017 film The Age of Blood.
- Portrayed by Jung Il-woo in the 2019 SBS TV series Haechi.
- Portrayed by Lee Deok-hwa in the 2021 MBC TV series The Red Sleeve.

== See also ==
- History of Korea
- List of monarchs of Korea
- Styles and titles in Joseon
- Politics of Joseon

== Notes ==
Yeongjo of Joseon House of Yi Born: 31 October 1694 Died: 22 April 1776
Royal titles
Preceded by Gyeongjong	King of Joseon; 11 October 1724 – 22 April 1776	Succeeded by Jeongjo
