= Princess Hwahyeop =

Korean princess (1733–1753)

- Born: 1733; Hanseong, Joseon
- Died: 1753 (aged 19); Daesa-dong, Joseon
- Burial: Geumgok, Yangju (now Sampae-dong, Namyangju)
- Spouse: Sin Gwang-su (m. 1743)
- Issue: Sin Jae-seon (adopted son)
- House: Jeonju Yi (by birth) Pyeongsan Shin (by marriage)
- Father: Yeongjo of Joseon
- Mother: Lady Seonhui of the Jeonui Lee clan

- Princess Hwahyeop
- Hangul: 화협옹주
- Hanja: 和協翁主
- RR: Hwahyeop ongju
- MR: Hwahyŏp ongju

Princess Hwahyeop (Korean: 화협옹주; Hanja: 和協翁主; 1733–1753), or Princess Hwahyop, was the seventh daughter of King Yeongjo of the Joseon dynasty in Korea.

== Biography ==
The princess' personal name is unknown. She was born as the fifth daughter to Lady Seonhui of the Jeonui Lee clan on the 7th day of the 3rd lunar month, 1733. (Note: The 3rd lunar month is 21 March – 20 April in Gregorian date)

She received the official title Princess Hwahyeop, meaning harmony in 1739 by an official decree. Her capping ceremony took place in 1743, the 19th year of King Yeongjo's reign. In the same year, she married Sin Gwang-su (신광수; 申光绥), the second and youngest son of Minister Sin Man (신만; 申晚) from the Pyeongsan Sin clan (평산신씨，平山申氏).

Princess Hwahyeop was renowned for her beauty and exceptional devotion to her parents, but it is reported that King Yeongjo disliked her due to his disappointment that she was not a male child.

In the Memoirs of Lady Hyegyŏng, it is said that King Yeongjo forbade Princess Hwahyeop to stay under the same roof as him and would get rid of his inauspiciousness by pouring water, which he used to wash his ears in front of Princess Hwahyeop's residence. When she got married, it was even reported that he was cold to her husband.

Similarly disfavored by their father, Prince Sado had a special affinity for his older sister.

Sometime in the 10th month of 1750, there was a large epidemics of measles in the capital. Princess Hwahyeop was the first to come down with it. The Crown Prince was attentive to her, and, during her illness, sent one servant after another to inquire about her.

She subsequently died of measles on the 27th day of the 11th lunar month, (Note: The 11th lunar month is 22 November – 22 December in Gregorian date) 1752, at the age of 19. When news of Princess Hwahyeop's death reached the palace, Crown Prince Sado mourned for her deeply. His grief was expressed in his eulogy dedicated to her.

She did not conceive any child but has an adopted son, Sin Jae-seon (신재선; 申在善), an off-spring from Sin Gwang-su's distant cousin. After her death, her husband conceived a son, Sin Jae-sun (신재순; 申在順), in 1755 with a woman from the Wonju Byeon clan, but it is unknown if the son was illegitimate or not.

== Tomb ==
Princess Hwahyeop's tomb was discovered in August 2015, in Sampae-dong, Namyangju, Gyeonggi Province (京畿道南杨州市三牌洞). This was the original burial site of the Princess with her husband Sin Gwang-su. In the 1970s, the coffins of the couple was shifted to another burial site in Jingeon-myeon (真乾邑), Namyangju, by their descendants for an unknown reason. Therefore, only traces of their coffins were found in this original burial site.

Characters carved on stone blocks placed on the right-hand side of the tomb were used to identify its occupant. The characters read: 有明朝鲜和協翁主之墓寅坐 (The burial of Princess Hwahyeop of the Joseon dynasty under the Ming Dynasty). The second excavation in December 2016 unearthed a memorial stone featuring a eulogy dictated by King Yeongjo, a stone chest containing porcelain jars for cosmetics, a bronze mirror, and a wooden comb. The eulogy by King Yeongjo contained a total of 394 characters written on the back, front, and sides of the memorial stone. The eulogy details the king's final visit to his ill daughter on the 25th day of the 11th lunar month, 1752, two days before her death. It has been remarked that it is rare for a Joseon king to inscribe a stone for a daughter, and the act has been taken as a sign of King Yeongjo's affection for this particular daughter.

== Family ==
- Father
  - Yi Geum, King Yeongjo of Joseon (영조대왕; 英祖大王; 31 October 1694 – 22 April 1776)
- Mother
  - Roble Noble Consort Yeong of the Jeonui Lee clan (소유영빈 전의 이씨; 暎嬪 全義 李氏; 15 August 1696 – 23 August 1764)
- Siblings
  - Older sister: Princess Hwapyeong (화평옹주; 和平翁主; 27 August 1727 – 24 June 1748)
  - Older sister: Princess Hwadeok (화덕옹주; 和德翁主; 3 August 1728 – 18 February 1731); died young
  - Older sister: Unnamed princess (옹주; 翁主; 12 December 1729 – 21 March 1731); died young
  - Older sister: Unnamed princess (옹주; 翁主; 1 January 1732 – 12 April 1736); died young
  - Younger brother: Crown Prince Sado (사도세자; 莊祖大王; 13 February 1735 – 12 July 1762)
  - Younger sister: Princess Hwawan (화완옹주; 和緩翁主; 9 March 1738 – May 1808)
- Husband
  - Sin Gwang-su, Prince Consort Yeongseong of the Pyeongsan Sin clan (영성위 신광수; 永城尉 申光綏; 1733–1775) (본관: 평산 신씨, 平山 申氏)
- Issue
  - Adoptive son: Sin Jae-seon (신재선; 申在善; 1753–1810); son of Sin Gwang-myeon (신광면; 申光勉; 1725–1786)

== Eulogies ==
Tomb Epitaph written by King Yeongjo

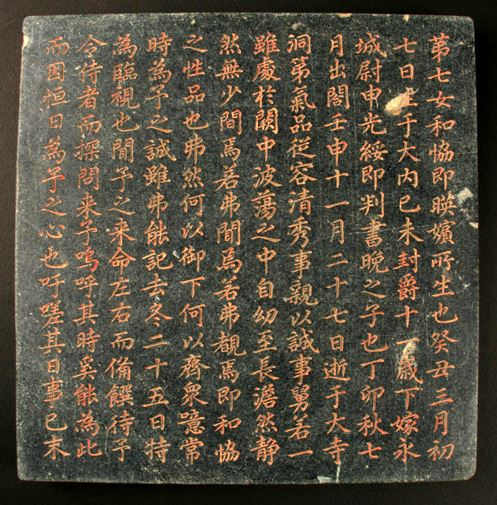
Memorial stone Front

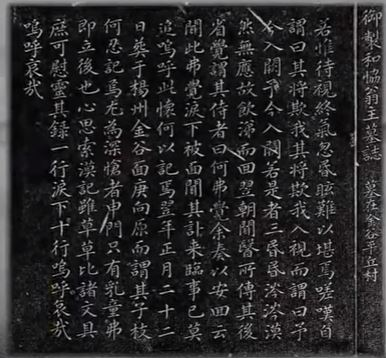
Memorial stone Side and Back

The Royal Epitaph of Princess Hwahyeop, buried in PyongChang Village, Geumgok (Yangju)

My seventh daughter was born of Royal Noble Consort Yeong (Lady Seonhui) on the 7th day of the 3rd lunar month of 1733 in the royal palace. She received a capping ceremony in 1739 and married Prince Consort Yongsong Sin Gwang-su, son of Minister Sin Man, at the age of 11. She left her maiden home in the 7th lunar month of 1747 and passed away on the 27th day of the 11th lunar month in 1752 at her residence located in Daesa-dong (modern day Insa-dong). She was composed in disposition and beautiful in appearance, genuine to her kins and devoted to her father-in-law. Despite growing up in a troubling palace, Hwahyeop remained tranquil and distant herself from affairs. What remarkable character! Else, how was she able to command respect of the servants and had all mourned wholeheartedly at her passing? Even I was impressed by her sincerity. I could still vividly recall the events on my visit to her on the 25th day (of the 11th month) last winter. Having heard the news of my visit, Hwahyeop had her chamberlains prepared food for me and sent them to me to inquire. She thought for me despite being critically ill. What a considerate daughter she was! I deeply lament the events that day. While awaiting my arrival, Hwahyeop suddenly felt breathless. She was weeping, "I am going to fail my father" before losing consciousness. Repeating three times, I said to her, "I'm about to return to my palace". Having no response from her, I came back to my palace in tears. I heard from a doctor the following day that Hwahyeop regained her consciousness and asked her chamberlains why they didn't wake her up, expressing her regret of not having been able to say her regard to me. Hearing that, tears ran down my face without my knowledge. I was told that she was planning to come and see me but it was already too late. I am overwhelmed by sorrow. On the 22nd day of the 1st month in the following year, Hwayeop was buried in the plains of Geumgok, Yangju. It saddens me even more to think that she had not had a descendant yet. I will select a child from the Sin family to continue her line. In grief, I penned this draft to console her passing soul. Writing down the story line by line, I cannot hold back my tears. I feel unbearably sad.

Sacrificial Eulogy written by Crown Prince Sado

Eulogy written for the sacrificial ritual of Princess Hwahyeop (Note: This eulogy was apparently a private eulogy by Crown Prince Sado and was not displayed in public. It is a piece included in his compilations 《凌虛關漫稿》. In the middle of the 1st month of 1753, about one and a half month after the passing of Princess Hwahyeop, Yeongjo asked his minister whether the Crown Prince had composed a Eulogy for his deceased sister. "I have not seen one," said Yeongjo. One officer Yun replied "I have seen his private eulogy during study lecture." (承政院日记：上曰, 和協翁主祭文, 亦入於東宮乎? 姑未見矣。得雨曰, 曾見私家祭文, 皆入小朝矣。上曰, 似然矣。）)

The 15th day of the 12th lunar month of 1752 in the second hour (sometimes between 1 and 3AM). Your younger brother, the Crown Prince, had ladies-in-waiting sent offerings to Princess Hwahyeop. My elder sister was virtuous and chaste. She was born into the royal family and had grown up (with me) in the palace. She lived to see twenty springs till one frosty snow took her to join the immortals. Who would have expected this? Now I have rarely seen the wild geese flying across the sky. I could not believe that what had started as a minor illness would end up incurable. Mother and I had been anxious (over your deteriorating health) day and night. You were sincere and filial till the end of your journey. Upon hearing that His Majesty was about to visit you, you rose from your sick bed. But your words drifted like flowing water and faded away with time. My grief is merely expressed through these humble offerings. Your virtue will be remembered as lingering fragrance.

Sacrificial Eulogy written by King Jeongjo

Eulogy written on the visit to Princess Hwahyeop's Tomb

Lamenting my aunt, how was she not virtuous and gentle? I have often heard about her kindness towards her brother. (Note: This refers to Crown Prince Sado, King Jeongjo's biological father.) Flowing along the path to the tomb is a beautiful river. Precious stones concealing beneath shimmering waters. I passed by in a carriage and wrote this short text in place of the libation of wine.

== Ancestry ==
Ancestors of Princess Hwahyeop

16. King Hyojong
8. King Hyeonjong
17. Queen Inseon of the Deoksu Jang clan
4. King Sukjong
18. Kim U-myeong
9. Queen Myeongseong of the Cheongpung Kim clan
19. Lady Deokeun of the Eunjin Song clan
2. King Yeongjo
20. Choi Tae-il
10. Choi Hyo-won
21. Lady Jang of the Pyeonggang Jang clan
5. Royal Noble Consort Sukbin of the Haeju Choi clan
22. Hong Gye-nam
11. Lady Hong of the Namyang Hong clan
23. Lady Kim of the Gangneung Kim clan
1. Princess Hwahyeop
6. Lee Yoo-beon
3. Royal Noble Consort Yeongbin of the Jeonui Lee clan
7. Lady Kim of Hanyang Kim clan

== See also ==
- History of Korea
- Joseon dynasty
