= Princess Hwawan =

Joseon princess (1738–1808)

Princess Hwawan (Korean: 화완옹주; Hanja: 和緩翁主; 9 March 1738 – 10 June 1808) was a Joseon princess and the ninth daughter of King Yeongjo of Joseon.

== Biography ==
Princess Hwawan was born in 1738, and she received the title Hwawan in 1743. She was the ninth daughter of King Yeongjo of Joseon, and her mother was one of Yeongjo's concubines, Royal Noble Consort Yeong of the Jeonui Yi clan. In 1749, the princess married Jeong Chi-dal (정치달; 鄭致達), and Yeongjo granted the title "Lord Ilseong" (일성위; 日城尉) to Jeong, in honor of his family, the Yeonil Jeong clan. Princess Hwawan bore a daughter in 1756, but the infant died by the next year, in 1757. In the same year, Lord Ilseong also died, so Princess Hwawan became a widow since her young age. As the couple had no other children as heir, so the court chose a boy, named Jeong In-dae, from the Jeong clan, as the princess' adopted son; he would be later known as Jeong Hu-gyeom (정후겸; 鄭厚謙).

The death of Princess Hwapyeong, Hwawan's elder sister and was the most favorite child of the king, in 1748, causes Yeongjo moved the affection of his late daughter to Princess Hwawan; since her widowhood in 1757, Yeongjo asked his daughter to live near the palace. Getting much favor from her father, Princess Hwawan gradually gained power in the court; on the other hand, Crown Prince Sado, her brother, had a tense relationship with their father, much to his jealousy. When Crown Prince Sado was still alive, as Princess Hwawan was terrified by his acts from his madness, she never rejected any of his requests and helped many of his problems. For example, in 1760, as Crown Prince Sado couldn't endure to be in the same palace with Yeongjo, by threatening Princess Hwawan, he urged the king move to Gyeonghuigung; meanwhile, the crown prince was exceptionally allowed to have a convalescence trip to the Onyang hot spring in Asan, and it was successfully requested by the princess as well.

Later in 1760s, Crown Prince Sado was executed in 1762; Royal Noble Consort Yeong, their mother, died in 1764. Princess Hwawan was asked to be the protector of Yi San, son of Crown Prince Sado and the new crown prince, and he would be later King Jeongjo of Joseon. Around the time, Princess Hwawan was much trusted by her father, and the young crown prince could remain safe in the rest of Yeongjo's reign. However, in attempt to control him, she estranged the relationship between the crown prince and crown princess (later Queen Hyoui); her adopted son, Jeong Hu-gyeom was involved heavily in troublesome Political factions in Joseon dynasty (between the Hidebound and Opportunist Factions). The mother and son, along with parties from some of the officials, caused the family members of Lady Hyegyŏng (who bore Jeongjo) to fall from power, which threatened the identity of Jeongjo as a crown prince.

Eventually, Jeongjo ascended the throne in 1776, following the death of his grandfather. For a long time, Jeongjo was willing to forgive Princess Hwawan, for she being the favorite daughter of the late king and his aunt. Yet, since the beginning of the reign, numerous officials asked the new king to execute the princess for her acts. Eventually, Princess Hwawan lost her title, becoming a commoner in 1778. By the next year, some officials commented in a document to the king:

...Jeong's wife [former Princess Hwawan] and her adherent are of full evil, and how could they live any longer by now? [...] We demand the law being executed. Please cease the order of her protection immediately and start the execution, to avoid any possible chaos.

Around 1782-83, it was decided that the former princess was to be exiled to an island; but she was soon sent back to the peninsula and she settled in Paju as of 1784. The suggestion of executing "Jeong's wife", or alternatively referred as "Jeong Chi-dal's wife" still constantly reoccurs throughout the reign of Jeongjo, according to records from the Journal of the Royal Secretariat, until she died in 1808, during the reign of Sunjo of Joseon, the son of King Jeongjo.

== Family ==
- Father: King Yeongjo of Joseon (1694–1776)
  - Queen Consorts: Queen Jeongseong (1692–1757), Queen Jeongsun (1745–1805)
- Mother: Royal Noble Consort Yeong (1696–1764)
- Father-in-law: Jeong U-ryang (Korean: 정우량; Hanja: 鄭羽良; 1692–1754)
- Mother-in-law: Lady Yi of the Jeonju Yi clan; the second wife Jeong U-ryang and Lord Ilseong was her second son. She was a 10-great-granddaughter of Prince Hyoryeong.
  - Husband: Jeong Chi-dal, Lord Ilseong (d. 1757); he was the second son of Jeong U-ryang and Lady Yi.
    - Adopted son: Jeong Hu-gyeom (1749–1777); he was by birth the second son of Jeong Seok-dal (a 4th cousin of Jeong Chi-dal) and Lady Yi of the Jeonju Yi clan. Since Jeongjo reigned, he was sent exiled to Kyongwon County in Hamgyong Province.
    - Adopted daughter-in-law: Lady Yi of the Deoksu Yi clan, second daughter of Yi Choe-jin. She either exiled with her husband or became slave with her daughter; the burial of hers and her husband's was unknown.

== Ancestry ==
Ancestors of Princess Hwawan

16. King Hyojong
8. King Hyeonjong
17. Queen Inryeol of the Cheongju Han clan
4. King Sukjong
18. Kim U-myeong
9. Queen Myeongseong of the Cheongpung Kim clan
19. Lady Song
2. King Yeongjo
20. Choe Tae-il
10. Choe Hyo-won
21. Lady Jang
5. Royal Noble Consort Suk of the Haeju Choi clan (숙빈 최씨)
22. Hong Gye-nam
11. Lady Hong
23. Lady Kim
1. Princess Hwawan
6. Lee Yoo-beon
3. Royal Noble Consort Yeong of the Lee clan
7. Lady Kim

== In popular culture ==
- Portrayed by Lee Sang-sook in the 1988 MBC TV series 500 Years of Joseon: Memoirs of Lady Hyegyeong.
- Portrayed by Lee Hyo-chun in the 1991 KBS TV series The Royal Way.
- Portrayed by Kim Ji Yeon in the 1998 MBC TV series The King's Road.
- Portrayed by Yoo Hye-ri in the 2001 KBS1 TV series Hong Guk-yeong.
- Portrayed by Hong Ae-bin in the 2007 CGV TV series Eight Days, Assassination Attempts against King Jeongjo.
- Portrayed by Sung Hyun-ah in the 2007 MBC TV series Lee San, Wind of the Palace.
- Portrayed by Jin Ji-hee in the 2015 film The Throne.
- Portrayed by Seo Hyo-rim in the 2021 MBC TV series The Red Sleeve.
