= Jeong Hu-gyeom =

Jeong Hu-gyeom (Korean: 정후겸; 1749–1777) was a Korean court official during the Joseon period. He was the Royal Secretary, and the youngest person ever to be part of the royal court. He was the adoptive son of Princess Hwawan.

== Biography ==
Jeong Hu-gyeom was born in 1749 as the second son of Jeong Seok-dal (a fisherman and 4th cousin of Jeong Chi-dal, Princess Hwawan's husband) and Lady Yi of the Jeonju Yi clan.

When he was a child, he was Crown Prince Yi San's study partner at the Confucian Academy. In his teens he studied in Qing China and as an adult he was very successful. He became a key member of the No-ron Faction and also part of the plot to destroy Yi San (Jeongjo). When the participants were punished, he was exiled to Kyongwon County in Hamgyong Province and put to death by poison.

== In popular culture ==
- Portrayed by Cho Yeon-woo in the 2007 MBC TV series Lee San, Wind of the Palace.
- Portrayed by Kwon Hyun-bin in the 2021 MBC TV series The Red Sleeve.
