= Crown Prince Sado =

Crown Prince of Joseon (1735–1762)

- King of Joseon (posthumously); Emperor of Korea (posthumously)
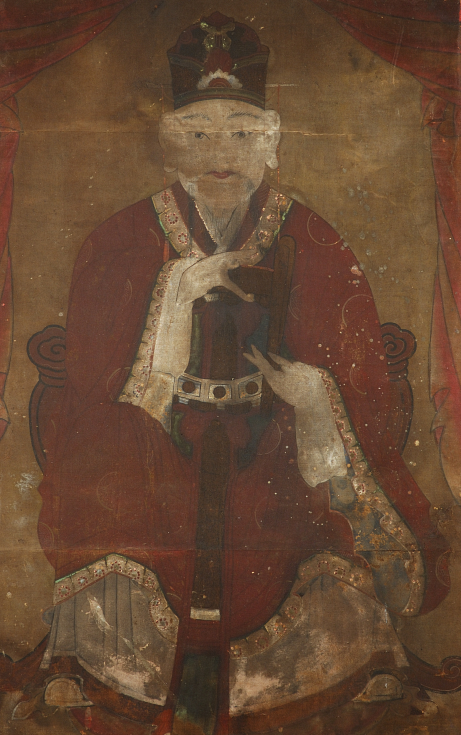
- 19th century portrait enshrined at Sasindang in Eunpyeong District, Seoul

Regent of Joseon
- Tenure: 15 March 1749 – 4 July 1762
- Monarch: Yeongjo

Crown Prince of Joseon
- Tenure: 25 April 1736 – 4 July 1762
- Investiture: Injeongjeon, Changdeokgung
- Predecessor: Crown Prince Haeng
- Successor: Crown Prince Yang
- Born: 13 February 1735; Jipbokheon, Changgyeonggung, Hanseong, Joseon
- Died: 12 July 1762 (aged 27); Munjeongjeon, Changgyeonggung, Hanseong, Joseon
- Burial: Yungneung, Hwaseong, South Korea
- Spouse: Queen Heonyeong (m. 1744)
- Issue Detail: Crown Prince Uiso; Jeongjo of Joseon; Prince Euneon; Princess Cheongyeon; Prince Eunsin; Princess Cheongseon
Names
- Yi Seon (이선; 李愃)
Regnal name
- Sudeok Dongyeong Hongin Gyeongji Jangryun Yungbeom Gimyeong Changhyu Chanwon Heonseong Gyesang Hyeonhui (수덕돈경홍인경지장륜융범기명창휴찬원헌성계상현희; 綏德敦慶弘仁景祉章倫隆范基命彰休贊元憲誠啓祥顯熙) (Note: Known as honorific name (존호; 尊號) in the Sinosphere, its closest equivalent in the English-speaking world is the regnal name.)
Posthumous name
- Joseon: Crown Prince Sado Jangheon (사도장헌세자; 思悼莊獻世子); Korean Empire: Great King Sinmun Hwanmu Jangheon Gwanghyo (신문환무장헌광효대왕; 神文桓武莊獻廣孝大王) → Emperor Sinmun Hwanmu Jangheon Gwanghyo Ui (신문환무장헌광효의황제; 文桓武莊獻廣孝懿皇帝)
Temple name
- Jangjong (장종; 莊宗) → Jangjo (장조; 莊祖) (Note: Conferred in September and December 1899, respectively.)
- Clan: Jeonju Yi
- Dynasty: Yi
- Father: King Yeongjo
- Mother: Concubine Yeong (biological); Queen Jeongseong (adoptive)
- Religion: Confucianism (Neo-Confucianism)

Korean name
- Hangul: 사도세자
- Hanja: 思悼世子
- RR: Sado seja
- MR: Sado seja

Art name
- Hangul: 의재
- Hanja: 毅齋
- RR: Uijae
- MR: Ŭijae

Courtesy name
- Hangul: 윤관
- Hanja: 允寬
- RR: Yungwan
- MR: Yun'gwan

Crown Prince Sado (Korean: 사도세자; Hanja: 思悼世子; 13 February 1735 – 12 July 1762), personal name Yi Seon, also known by his temple name King Jangjo, was the second son of King Yeongjo, the 21st monarch of Joseon, and the biological father of King Jeongjo. Due to the prior death of his elder half-brother, Crown Prince Hyojang, he was the probable future monarch. However, at the age of 27, he died, most likely of dehydration and possibly of starvation, after being confined in a rice chest in the heat of summer at the order of his father. Following the establishment of the Korean Empire, he was honored as Emperor Ui.

== Biography ==
=== Onset of mental disorder ===
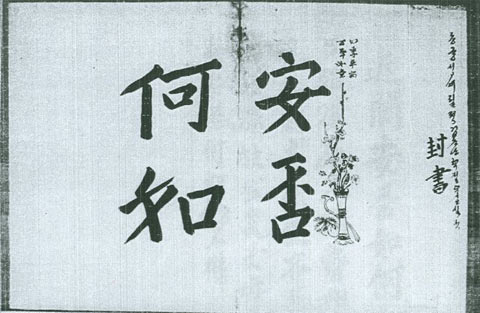
Letter written by Crown Prince Sado to his father-in-law

Lady Hyegyŏng, Sado's wife, wrote a memoir in 1805 detailing their life together. She records that the prince suffered a serious illness in 1745, during which he often lost consciousness. Although he recovered, the tense relationship between Sado and his father, King Yeongjo, led to him experiencing extreme anxiety whenever in his father's presence. When Sado came of age at 15, his father appointed him regent, giving him the power to make decisions on administrative matters. During his regency, the disputes between the Soron and Noron factions became stronger, much to Yeongjo's disappointment. Lady Hyegyŏng describes the king as perpetually dissatisfied with whichever course of action Sado chose. Moreover, Yeongjo often chastised his son in front of a large crowd, either of palace ladies or eunuchs. As a result, Sado formed a strong bond with his elder sister Princess Hwahyeop, who was similarly disliked by their father. When she passed away in 1752, Sado was reported to have grieved intensely.

In 1752, Sado read a Taoist text called Okchugyeong (옥추경). Whilst reading, he hallucinated that he saw the Thunder God. Court records also reveal that Yeongjo once scolded Sado by declaring that "the thunder on the previous night was a warning that [Sado] should develop moral virtue". Henceforth, Sado was terrified of thunder and refused to touch any object engraved with the word.

Also around 1752, Sado favored a palace maid named Im Yu-hye (posthumously Concubine Suk), and she later became pregnant. Fearing his father's reprimand, Sado forced her to take abortive medicine, but nevertheless, the child was born safely. Arrangements for the delivery and housing were made by Lady Hyegyŏng.

=== Severe decline ===
In 1757, Sado's adoptive grandmother (Queen Inwon) and adoptive mother (Queen Jeongseong) died within less than two months of each other. He had been close to both of them and their deaths led to a marked deterioration in his mental health and relationship with his father. As a way of dealing with his frustration and rage, Sado would beat his eunuchs. In the same month as the burial of Queen Jeongseong, Sado walked into his chambers holding the severed head of a eunuch whom he had killed, forcing the palace ladies and his wife to view it. After this, he frequently killed servants to release his emotions, as well as assaulting and raping countless maids. Lady Hyegyŏng reported Sado's issues to his biological mother, Concubine Yeong, but begged her not to speak to anyone about the matter, as she feared for her safety if Sado discovered she had told anyone.

In late 1757, Sado took as his concubine a palace maid named Park Bing-ae (posthumously Concubine Gyeong); she had previously served the late Queen Inwon, so the relationship was considered taboo. When Yeongjo found out, he berated his son and Sado eventually jumped down a well in an attempt to drown himself, but a guard pulled him out. Lady Hyegyŏng had, by this point, managed to have the maid hidden in the home of Sado's younger sister, Princess Hwawan.

By 1758, a previous phobia of Sado's regarding clothing (vestiphobia) became intensely problematic. He used such large amounts of clothing that his stipend as crown prince could not cover the expenses. Lady Hyegyŏng reported being forced to borrow money from her father, as well as having to spend much of her own time making new clothes. Sado's obsessions lengthened the time he required to dress, and the process was sometimes deadly.

For him to get dressed, I had to have ten, twenty, or even thirty sets of clothes laid out. He would then burn some, supposedly on behalf of some ghost or other. Even after this, if he managed to get into a suit of clothes without incident, one had to count it as great good luck. If, however, those serving him were to make the slightest error, he would not be able to put his clothes on, no matter how hard he tried. In the process, people were hurt, even killed. It was truly dreadful.

— Lady Hyegyŏng, Memoirs of Lady Hyegyŏng

On his birthday in 1760, Sado suffered an intense outburst of anger, cursing Concubine Yeong, as well as his children. After this, he demanded that Princess Hwawan use her influence over their father to allow Sado to visit the hot springs at Onyang. He also threatened to "slash Princess Hwawan with [his] sword", an event witnessed by Lady Hyegyŏng and Concubine Yeong.

In 1761, Park Bing-ae, who had given birth to two sons by this time, was beaten by Sado in a fit of rage while he was getting dressed. He left her on the floor, where she died of her injuries. Lady Hyegyŏng prepared her body for the funeral rites, but, on his return, Sado reportedly said nothing about the death.

Although Lady Hyegyŏng claimed he didn't treat her in the same way, she noted he would beat any woman who resisted his sexual overtures and that he "tore their flesh" until they gave in. However, there is one documented incident in which Sado was physically violent toward his wife, throwing a go board at her face and making it necessary for Lady Hyegyŏng to avoid court events to hide the bruises.

=== Execution ===
In the summer of 1762, rumors that Sado had attempted to enter the main palace to kill King Yeongjo spread around the court. Fearing for the safety of her grandchildren, Concubine Yeong begged Yeongjo to deal with Sado. By court rules, the body of a royal could not be defiled and, under the then-common practice of collective punishment, Sado's wife and children (including the royal family's only direct heir) could also face death if he were executed as a criminal. As a solution, Yeongjo ordered Sado to climb into a wooden rice chest (roughly 1.3 meters square / 4 feet square) on a hot July day in 1762. According to Lady Hyegyŏng's memoirs, Sado begged for his life before getting into the chest, and later attempted to get out.

Lady Hyegyŏng, along with her children, was taken to her father's house on the same day. After two days, King Yeongjo had the chest containing Sado tied with rope, covered with grass, and moved to the main palace. Sado responded from inside the chest until the night of the seventh day; the chest was opened and he was pronounced dead on the eighth day. Yeongjo then restored him to the position of crown prince and gave him the posthumous name Sado (사도; lit. ''thinking of with great sorrow'').

=== Conspiracy theories ===
During the 19th century, there were rumors that Crown Prince Sado had not been mentally unstable, but had been framed by political rivals; however, these rumors are contradicted by his wife in the Memoirs of Lady Hyegyŏng. According to historians, there is no evidence that Sado was the victim of a plot.

=== Burial ===
Crown Prince Sado was initially buried on Baebong Mountain in Yangju (present-day Dongdaemun District, Seoul). His body was moved by King Jeongjo to its current location near Suwon in 1789, and the tomb was named Hyeonryungwon (현륭원). Five years later, the Hwaseong Fortress was built by Jeongjo in the area, specifically to memorialize and honor his biological father. Lady Hyegyŏng was buried with her husband after her death in 1816.

Sado received a temple name and was posthumously elevated to the status of king and then emperor during Gojong's reign. His tomb was upgraded accordingly and renamed Yungneung (융릉).

=== Taboo and reinstatement ===
Sado was reinstated as crown prince fifteen days after his death, but King Yeongjo banned any mention of his name for the rest of his reign. Because of this decision, Sado's son, Jeongjo, ascended the throne following the passing of Yeongjo as the heir of Sado's long-deceased elder half-brother, Crown Prince Hyojang. Upon becoming king, however, one of Jeongjo's first statements was to declare, "I am the son of Prince Sado." Jeongjo continued to show great filial devotion to his biological father, and enhanced his posthumous name, which is the origin of the latter's alternative title, Crown Prince Jangheon (장헌세자).

=== Worship ===
In Korean shamanism, Sado is worshiped as a wangshin (왕신; lit. ''king god'').

== Family ==
- Father: King Yeongjo (영조대왕; 31 October 1694 – 22 April 1776)
  - Grandfather: King Sukjong (숙종대왕; 7 October 1661 – 12 July 1720)
  - Biological grandmother: Concubine Suk (숙빈), of the Haeju Choe clan (해주 최씨; 17 December 1670 – 9 April 1718)
  - Adoptive grandmother: Queen Inwon (인원왕후), of the Gyeongju Kim clan (경주 김씨; 3 November 1687 – 13 May 1757)
- Biological mother: Concubine Yeong (영빈), of the Jeonui Yi clan (전의 이씨; 5 August 1696 – 12 August 1764)
  - Grandfather: Yi Yu-beon (이유번)
  - Grandmother: Lady, of the Hanyang Kim clan (한양 김씨)
- Adoptive mother: Queen Jeongseong (정성왕후), of the Daegu Seo clan (대구 서씨; 2 January 1693 – 23 March 1757)
- Stepmother: Queen Jeongsun (정순왕후), of the Gyeongju Kim clan (경주 김씨; 2 December 1745 – 11 February 1805)

Consort(s) and their respective issue

- Queen Heongyeong (헌경왕후), of the Pungsan Hong clan (풍산 홍씨; 6 August 1735 – 1 January 1816)
  - Yi Jeong (이정), Crown Prince Uiso (의소세자; 27 September 1750 – 17 April 1752), first son
  - Yi San (이산), King Jeongjo (정조대왕; 28 October 1752 – 18 August 1800), second son
  - Princess Cheongyeon (청연공주; 31 August 1754 – 7 July 1821), first daughter
  - Princess Cheongseon (청선공주; 1756 – 17 August 1802), second daughter
- Concubine Suk (숙빈), of the Buan Im clan (부안 임씨), given name Yu-hye (유혜)
  - Yi In (이인), Prince Euneon (은언군; 22 February 1754 – 9 July 1801), third son
  - Yi Jin (이진), Prince Eunsin (은신군; 21 February 1755 – 13 May 1771), fourth son
- Concubine Gyeong (경빈), of the Park clan (박씨; ?–1761), given name Bing-ae (빙애)
  - Princess Cheonggeun (청근옹주; 1758 – 10 October 1835), third daughter
  - Yi Chan (이찬), Prince Eunjeon (은전군; 4 October 1759 – 27 September 1777), fifth son
- Palace Lady (수칙), of the Yi clan (이씨), given name Jeong-ryeol (정렬) (Note: Suchik (수칙; 守則); female official in the crown prince's palace, whose rank was equivalent to the junior sixth rank in the internal court.)

== Ancestry ==
Ancestors of Crown Prince Sado

King Hyojong (효종대왕)
King Hyeonjong (현종대왕)
Queen Inseon, of the Deoksu Jang clan (인선왕후 덕수 장씨)
King Sukjong (숙종대왕)
Kim U-myeong, Internal Prince Cheongpung (청풍부원군 김우명)
Queen Myeongseong, of the Cheongpung Kim clan (명성왕후 청풍 김씨)
Internal Princess Consort Deokeun, of the Eunjin Song clan (덕은부부인 은진 송씨)
King Yeongjo (영조대왕)
Choe Tae-il (최태일)
Choe Hyo-won (최효원)
Lady, of the Pyonggang Jang clan (평강 장씨)
Concubine Suk, of the Haeju Choe clan (숙빈 해주 최씨)
Hong Gye-nam (홍계남)
Lady, of the Namyang Hong clan (남양 홍씨)
Lady, of the Gangneung Kim clan (강릉 김씨)
Crown Prince Sado
Yi Yeong-im (이영임)
Yi Yu-beon (이유번)
Concubine Yeong, of the Jeonui Yi clan (영빈 전의 이씨)
Kim U-jong (김우종)
Lady, of the Hanyang Kim clan (한양 김씨)
Lady, of the Jeonju Yi clan (전주 이씨)

== In popular culture ==
- Portrayed by Hwang Hae-nam in the 1956 film The Tragic Prince.
- Portrayed by Do Kum-bo in the 1963 film A Wife Turned to Stone.
- Portrayed by Choi Soo-jong in the 1988 MBC TV series 500 Years of Joseon: The Memoirs of Lady Hyegyeong.
- Portrayed by Jeong Bo-seok in the 1988–1989 KBS2 TV series Oh, Heaven.
- Portrayed by Im Ho in the 1998 MBC TV series King of the Wind.
- Portrayed by Lee Chang-hoon in the 2007 MBC TV series Lee San, Wind of the Palace.
- Portrayed by Jo Han-jun in the 2007 CGV TV series Eight Days, Assassination Attempts against King Jeongjo.
- Portrayed by Oh Man-seok in the 2011 SBS TV series Warrior Baek Dong-soo.
- Portrayed in a fictitious manner in the 2012–2014 webcomic Vampire of the East by Joohee Jo and Seunghee Han.
- Portrayed by Lee Je-hoon in the 2014 SBS TV series Secret Door.
- Portrayed by Yoo Ah-in in the 2015 film The Throne.
- Portrayed by Do Sang-woo in the 2021 MBC TV series The Red Sleeve.
- Portrayed in a fictitious manner in the 2022 novel The Red Palace by June Hur.

== See also ==
- Political factions of Joseon
- Politics of Joseon
- History of Korea
- Styles and titles in Joseon
