= The Throne (film) =

- Theatrical release poster
- Hangul: 사도
- Hanja: 思悼
- RR: Sado
- MR: Sado
- Directed by: Lee Joon-ik
- Written by: Cho Chul-hyun; Oh Seung-hyeon; Lee Song-won
- Produced by: Oh Seung-hyeon
- Starring: Song Kang-ho; Yoo Ah-in; Moon Geun-young; Jeon Hye-jin; Kim Hae-sook; Park Won-sang
- Cinematography: Kim Tae-gyeong
- Edited by: Kim Sang-bum; Kim Jae-bum
- Music by: Bang Jun-seok
- Distributed by: Showbox/Mediaplex
- Release date: 16 September 2015
- Running time: 125 minutes
- Country: South Korea
- Language: Korean
- Budget: US$8.3 million
- Box office: US$45.9 million

The Throne (Korean: 사도; RR: Sado) is a 2015 South Korean historical drama film directed by Lee Joon-ik, starring Song Kang-ho and Yoo Ah-in. Set during the reign of King Yeongjo, the film is about the life of Crown Prince Sado, the heir to the throne who was deemed unfit to rule and, at age 27, was condemned to death by his own father by being locked in a rice chest for eight days.

The Throne won three awards at the 35th Korean Association of Film Critics Awards, including Best Film. It was also selected as the South Korean entry for the Best Foreign Language Film at the 88th Academy Awards, but it was not nominated.

== Plot ==
The film opens with the crown prince, Sado, carrying out a plot to kill his father, the king. However, the assassination - for untold reasons - does not take place.

The next day, Sado's mother goes to the king to encourage him not to punish Sado's son when he punishes Sado. The king summons Sado and tells him to kill himself. Fearing for their own lives, Sado's supporters rush in and save him from suicide. Instead the king orders Sado into a large rice box, which he then nails shut since no one else will do it for him.

The movie proceeds to flip back and forth chronologically between the rice box in the courtyard and the history of how it got there.

The king is presented as a doting father very concerned with the educational attainments of his young son. Sado is presented as winsome and diplomatic even at a very early age. However, he does not take well to the rote memorization he is expected to perform. He fails to properly acquire a passage written by his father, and we find him preferring to socialize and paint. When asked how often he likes to study, all are shocked with his very frank answer of "once or twice a year." The king perceives his son is being rebellious.

Meanwhile, three days in the box Sado begins to hallucinate. He imagines he is covered by centipedes and breaks out of the box, washing himself in the pond. He is returned to the box, which is then fortified.

In another flashback, the king describes familial relations among royalty being different from commoners. "In the palace, parents think of their children as enemies." Sado's father goes on to tell how his father had his wife poisoned, and he himself has been accused of killing his own brother to secure the throne. Here and at other places during the movie he claims he does not want to be the king.

The king proposes his son be made a substitute king, a method by which the crown prince may exercise the office of king under the ongoing tutelage of the elderly king. In his new role, Sado is assertive and just, but some factions that have enjoyed special privilege under the corrupt elder king take issue with his rulings. The elder king jumps to the conclusion that his son is capitalizing on schisms within the kingdom to weaken the elder king's powers. He directs his son to make fewer decisions and allow the nobles to lead. However, when his son defers to them, the king is alarmed at the decisions of his nobles and countermands Sado's rulings. Then Sado begins to consult his father to make wiser decisions, but the old man ridicules his son for being unable to govern independently. Nothing Sado does is pleasing to the king, who proceeds to humiliate his son. However, the Royal Queen Dowager is overjoyed at Sado's wisdom and acts as his protector.

When the king refuses to call for celebrations for the queen's 60th birthday, the tension comes to a head. He storms into her chambers and insists that she support him or approve his stepping down. Much to his shock, she approves, thereby making Sado king.

Curiously, Sado refuses to ascend the throne. After the elderly king's departure, Sado remains kneeling in the courtyard where his subjects fear he will die of exposure. The queen is forced to revoke her approval, and in humiliation, she stops eating, bringing her life to an end. At her funeral, the elder king blames Sado for her death. Sado snaps.

Sado becomes a religious zealot and an alcoholic. He digs an underground grave complex for himself and refuses to pay his respects to the new queen. In a rage, he kills one of the palace eunuchs. He throws a celebration for his mother for her 60th birthday at which his actions imply madness. Meanwhile, the elder king takes on Sado's son as his new protege, but has his own son framed for plotting a conspiracy against the crown.

The scene from the beginning is replayed with a few additions, the important one being why he did not kill his father. At the critical moment, he found his son with his grandfather and overheard his son tell his grandfather that Sado had a good heart. Sado did not go through with the assassination.

Sado dies on the seventh day of his imprisonment and is buried on the eighth, but his father has all memory of him erased. He directs his grandson never to even speak his name. However, after the death of the elder king, Sado's son goes out of his way to honour his father, thereby vindicating Sado.

== Cast ==
- Song Kang-ho as King Yeongjo
- Yoo Ah-in as Crown Prince Sado
- Moon Geun-young as Lady Hyegyeong
  - Shin Soo-yeon as young Lady Hyegyeong
- Jeon Hye-jin as Consort Yeong
- Kim Hae-sook as Queen Inwon
- Park Won-sang as Hong Bong-han
- Lee Dae-yeon as Kim Sang-ro
- Kang Seong-hae as Kim Han-gu
- Choi Deok-moon as Hong In-han
- Jung Suk-yong as Eunuch Hong
- Choi Min-chul as Chae Je-gong
- Jin Ji-hee as Princess Hwawan
- Park Myeong-shin as Queen Jeongseong
- Seo Yea-ji as Queen Jeongsun
- Park So-dam as Lady Moon
- Son Deok-gi as Hong Nak-in
- Cha Soon-bae as Park Nae-gwan
- So Ji-sub as King Jeongjo (cameo)

== Production ==
Filming began on 8 July 2014. The Throne was Moon Geun-young's first film in 8 years.

== Reception ==
=== Box office ===
The Throne opened in South Korea on 16 September 2015. By October 25, it has grossed ₩48.7 billion (US$42.9 million) from 6.23 million admissions.

=== Awards and nominations ===
Award	Year	Category	Recipient(s) and nominee(s)	Result
35th Korean Association of Film Critics Awards	2015	Best Film	The Throne	Won
35th Korean Association of Film Critics Awards	2015	Best Director	Lee Joon-ik	Nominated
35th Korean Association of Film Critics Awards	2015	Best Actor	Song Kang-ho	Nominated
35th Korean Association of Film Critics Awards	2015	Best Actor	Yoo Ah-in	Nominated
35th Korean Association of Film Critics Awards	2015	Best Cinematography	Kim Tae-gyeong	Nominated
35th Korean Association of Film Critics Awards	2015	Best Screenplay	Cho Chul-hyun, Oh Seung-hyeon, Lee Song-won	Won
35th Korean Association of Film Critics Awards	2015	Best Music	Bang Jun-seok	Won
35th Korean Association of Film Critics Awards	2015	Top 10 Films of the Year	The Throne	Won
15th Korea World Youth Film Festival	2015	Most Favorite Actor	Yoo Ah-in	Won
52nd Grand Bell Awards	2015	Best Film	The Throne	Nominated
52nd Grand Bell Awards	2015	Best Director	Lee Joon-ik	Nominated
52nd Grand Bell Awards	2015	Best Actor	Yoo Ah-in	Nominated
52nd Grand Bell Awards	2015	Best Supporting Actress	Kim Hae-sook	Won
52nd Grand Bell Awards	2015	Best Art Direction	Kang Seung-yong	Nominated
52nd Grand Bell Awards	2015	Best Costume Design	Shim Hyun-sub	Nominated
52nd Grand Bell Awards	2015	Best Music	Bang Jun-seok	Nominated
36th Blue Dragon Film Awards	2015	Best Film	The Throne	Nominated
36th Blue Dragon Film Awards	2015	Best Director	Lee Joon-ik	Nominated
36th Blue Dragon Film Awards	2015	Best Leading Actor	Song Kang-ho	Nominated
36th Blue Dragon Film Awards	2015	Best Leading Actor	Yoo Ah-in	Won
36th Blue Dragon Film Awards	2015	Best Supporting Actress	Jeon Hye-jin	Won
36th Blue Dragon Film Awards	2015	Best Screenplay	Cho Chul-hyun, Oh Seung-hyeon, Lee Song-won	Nominated
36th Blue Dragon Film Awards	2015	Best Cinematography and Lighting	Kim Tae-gyeong, Hong Seung-cheol	Won
36th Blue Dragon Film Awards	2015	Best Editing	Kim Sang-bum, Kim Jae-bum	Nominated
36th Blue Dragon Film Awards	2015	Best Art Direction	Kang Seung-yong	Nominated
36th Blue Dragon Film Awards	2015	Best Music	Bang Jun-seok	Won
19th Tallinn Black Nights Film Festival	2015	Grand Prix	The Throne	Won
19th Tallinn Black Nights Film Festival	2015	Best Music	Bang Jun-seok	Won
5th SACF Artists of the Year Awards	2015	Artistic Impression in Motion Pictures Award	Yoo Ah-in	Won
The Korea Film Actors Association Awards	2015	Top Star Award	Yoo Ah-in	Won
The Korea Film Actors Association Awards	2015	Best Director Award	Lee Joon-ik	Won
Cine 21 Movie Awards	2015	Best Actor	Yoo Ah-in	Won
Cine 21 Movie Awards	2015	Best Screenplay	Cho Chul-hyun, Oh Seung-hyeon, Lee Song-won	Won
2nd Korean Film Producers Association Awards	2015	Best Supporting Actress	Jeon Hye-jin	Won
2nd Korean Film Producers Association Awards	2015	Best Screenplay	Cho Chul-hyun, Oh Seung-hyeon, Lee Song-won	Won
2nd Korean Film Producers Association Awards	2015	Best Sound	Choi Tae-young	Won
7th KOFRA Film Awards	2016	Best Film	The Throne	Won
7th KOFRA Film Awards	2016	Best Actor	Yoo Ah-in	Won
7th KOFRA Film Awards	2016	Best Supporting Actress	Jeon Hye-jin	Won
Asian Film Critics Association Awards	2016	Best Picture	The Throne	Nominated
Asian Film Critics Association Awards	2016	Best Director	Lee Joon-ik	Nominated
Asian Film Critics Association Awards	2016	Best Actor	Song Kang-ho	Nominated
Asian Film Critics Association Awards	2016	Best Actor	Yoo Ah-in	Nominated
Asian Film Critics Association Awards	2016	Best Supporting Actress	Jeon Hye-jin	Nominated
Asian Film Critics Association Awards	2016	Best Screenplay	Cho Chul-hyun, Oh Seung-hyeon, Lee Song-won	Nominated
Asian Film Critics Association Awards	2016	Best Original Score	Bang Jun-seok	Nominated
20th Satellite Awards	2016	Best Foreign Language Film	The Throne	Nominated
20th Satellite Awards	2016	Best Costume Design	Shim Hyun-seob	Nominated
11th Max Movie Awards	2016	Best Film	The Throne	Nominated
11th Max Movie Awards	2016	Best Director	Lee Joon-ik	Nominated
11th Max Movie Awards	2016	Best Supporting Actress	Jeon Hye-jin	Nominated
11th Max Movie Awards	2016	Best Poster	The Throne	Nominated
11th Max Movie Awards	2016	Best Trailer	The Throne	Nominated
10th Asian Film Awards	2016	Best Original Music	Bang Jun-seok	Nominated
10th Asian Film Awards	2016	Best Costume Design	Shim Hyun-seob	Won
10th Asian Film Awards	2016	Next Generation Award	Yoo Ah-in	Won
21st Chunsa Film Art Awards	2016	Best Director	Lee Joon-ik	Nominated
21st Chunsa Film Art Awards	2016	Best Actor	Yoo Ah-in	Won
21st Chunsa Film Art Awards	2016	Best Supporting Actress	Jeon Hye-jin	Nominated
21st Chunsa Film Art Awards	2016	Best Screenplay	Cho Chul-hyun, Oh Seung-hyeon, Lee Song-won	Won
21st Chunsa Film Art Awards	2016	Special Sharing Award	Lee Joon-ik	Won
52nd Baeksang Arts Awards	2016	Grand Prize (Daesang)	Lee Joon-ik	Won
52nd Baeksang Arts Awards	2016	Best Actor	Song Kang-ho	Nominated
52nd Baeksang Arts Awards	2016	Best Actor	Yoo Ah-in	Nominated
52nd Baeksang Arts Awards	2016	Best Supporting Actress	Jeon Hye-jin	Nominated
25th Buil Film Awards	2016	Best Supporting Actress	Jeon Hye-jin	Nominated
25th Buil Film Awards	2016	Best Art Direction	Kang Seung-yong	Nominated
25th Buil Film Awards	2016	Best Music	Bang Joon-seok	Nominated
10th Asia Pacific Screen Awards	2016	Best Director	Lee Joon-ik	Nominated
10th Asia Pacific Screen Awards	2016	Best Actor	Song Kang-ho	Nominated
4th Asian Film Festival Barcelona	2016	Best Film	The Throne	Won
47th International Film Festival of India	2016	Best Film	The Throne	Nominated
47th International Film Festival of India	2016	Special Jury Award	The Throne	Won

== See also ==
- List of submissions to the 88th Academy Awards for Best Foreign Language Film
- List of South Korean submissions for the Academy Award for Best Foreign Language Film
