= Yeongbin Yi =

Joseon royal consort (1696–1764)

- Royal Consort of the Senior First Rank
- Born: 5 August 1696; Joseon
- Died: 12 August 1764 (aged 68); Yangdeokdang Hall, Gyeonghuigung, Hanseong, Joseon
- Burial: Sugyeongwon, Seooreung Cluster, Goyang, South Korea
- Consort of: Yeongjo of Joseon
- Issue Detail: Princess Hwapyeong; Princess Hwahyeop; Crown Prince Sado; Princess Hwawan
Names
- Ranks: Sugui (숙의; 淑儀; from 1726) → Gwiin (귀인; 貴人; from 1728) → Bin (빈; 嬪; from 1731)
Posthumous name
- Soyu (소유; 昭裕)
- Clan: Jeonui Yi (by birth); Jeonju Yi (by marriage)
- Dynasty: Yi
- Father: Yi Yu-beon
- Mother: Lady, of the Hanyang Kim clan

Korean name
- Hangul: 영빈 이씨
- Hanja: 暎嬪 李氏
- RR: Yeongbin Issi
- MR: Yŏngbin Issi

Yeongbin Yi (Korean: 영빈 이씨; Hanja: 暎嬪 李氏; 5 August 1696 – 12 August 1764), or Concubine Yeong, (Note: The literal translation of bin (빈; 嬪) is "concubine". Combined with the honorific title yeong (영; 暎), the full meaning is "Reflective Concubine".) of the Jeonui Yi clan, was a consort of Yeongjo of Joseon and the biological mother of the ill-fated Crown Prince Sado. She is most well known for influencing court politics, as the king often asked for her advice and she regularly accompanied him on inspection tours. Because of the passivity of Queen Jeongseong, Lady Yi also acted as the leader of the Internal Court.

== Biography ==
=== Early life ===
Lady Yi was born into the Jeonui Yi clan to Yi Yu-beon, and his wife, a lady from the Hanyang Kim clan.

In 1701, at the age of 6, Lady Yi entered the palace and became a kungnyŏ.

=== Palace life ===
At the age of 31, in the second year of King Yeongjo's reign, Lady Yi became his concubine. She was appointed as a royal consort of the junior second rank (숙의; 淑儀; sugui).

One year later, in 1727, she gave birth to a daughter, Princess Hwapyeong. She was promoted to the junior first rank (귀인; 貴人; gwiin) the following year.

Between 1728 and 1732, Lady Yi gave birth to three daughters, but all of them died young. In 1730, she was elevated to the senior first rank (빈; 嬪; bin), with the honorific title yeong (영; 暎), meaning "to reflect". In 1732, she gave birth to her fifth daughter, Princess Hwahyeop. Her sixth daughter, Princess Hwawan, was born in 1738.

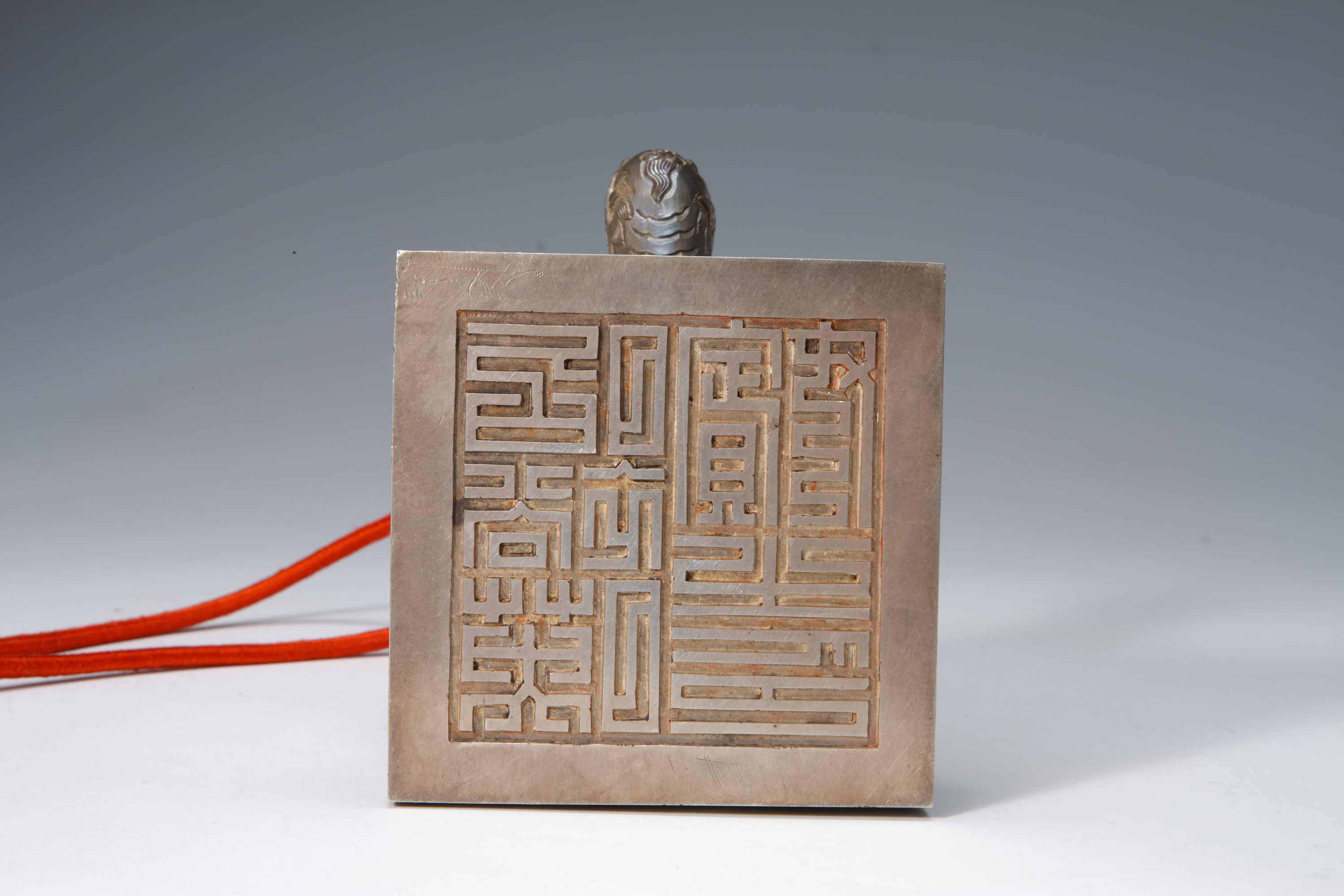
Lady Yi's seal

Lady Yi had given birth to the heir apparent in 1735. Yi Seon was not the first male child to be born to Yeongjo, but the death of Crown Prince Hyojang, nearly seven years earlier, meant that the court was particularly pleased to welcome another son.

Yeongjo ordered Yi Seon to be brought up in a separate palace, so Lady Yi did not personally oversee his upbringing. The court ladies in charge of looking after the crown prince apparently slighted her frequently, as they considered her to be of common birth.

Lady Hyegyeong (Lady Hong), Yi Seon's wife, recorded that Lady Yi was affectionate toward her children, but very strict and taught them, "as if she were not their mother". However, she personally tended to her children when they fell ill.

When Lady Hong entered the palace to marry the crown prince, Lady Yi treated her as one of her own children, despite the fact that the new crown princess was expected to address the king's wife, Queen Jeongseong, as her mother-in-law.

In 1748, Princess Hwapyeong died at the age of 21, and Lady Yi is recorded as having grieved excessively.

After the death of his first wife, Yeongjo married his second wife, Queen Jeongsun, in 1759. Lady Yi supported his decision to remarry and assisted in preparing the state celebrations.

She was aware the king disliked the crown prince, an issue that Queen Jeongseong had frequently discussed with her during her lifetime. She was also aware that her son was suffering from serious mental disorders and that he was killing palace ladies and eunuchs, as the crown princess went to her for advice after Yi Seon's first murder in 1757. Though Lady Yi initially wanted to talk to Yi Seon, Lady Hong persuaded her not to, as she feared the consequences if the crown prince found out she had spoken to his mother. In 1760, the crown prince lost his temper at a birthday celebration and cursed at his mother and children. When he began to threaten Princess Hwawan to gain more personal freedoms, Lady Yi attended their meetings, as she feared for her youngest daughter's safety. During one meeting in 1760, she witness Yi Seon threaten to "slash Princess Hwawan with [his] sword".

=== Execution of Crown Prince Sado ===
In 1762, Lady Yi wrote to Lady Hong in response to the rumor that the crown prince had attempted to enter the main palace to kill his father. In the letter, she apologised preemptively. On the same day, she spoke to Yeongjo and stated that Yi Seon was uncontrollable. She advised that the crown prince should be removed, but his wife and children should not be harmed. After the king left, Lady Yi apparently beat her chest and refused to eat.

After Yi Seon's execution, Lady Hong records that Lady Yi transferred her love to her eldest grandson (Yi San, posthumously King Jeongjo), who moved into the main palace and slept in the same room as his biological grandmother. She organised his meals and study sessions.

=== Death and burial ===
Lady Yi developed a tumor on her back and died on 12 August 1764. In Lady Hong's opinion, Lady Yi's intense grief after the execution of her son had weakened her.

She was buried in the Seooreung Cluster, in Goyang, Gyeonggi Province, South Korea. The tomb is known as Sugyeongwon (수경원; 綏慶園). Her spirit tablet was enshrined in Chilgung (칠궁; 七宮), the place which houses the spirit tablets of seven royal consorts who gave birth to kings.

During Gojong's reign, Lady Yi was conferred the posthumous name Soyu (소유; 昭裕; lit. ''luminous abundance'').

== Family ==
- Father: Yi Yu-beon (이유번; 李楡蕃)
- Mother: Honorable and Respectful Madame, of the Hanyang Kim clan (정경부인 한양 김씨; 貞敬夫人 漢陽 金氏)
- Husband: Yi Geum, King Yeongjo (영조대왕 이금; 31 October 1694 – 22 April 1776)
  - Princess Hwapyeong (화평 옹주; 和平 翁主; 27 April 1727 – 24 June 1748)
  - Unnamed daughter (3 August 1728 – 18 February 1731)
  - Unnamed daughter (12 December 1729 – 21 March 1731)
  - Unnamed daughter (1 January 1732 – 12 April 1736)
  - Princess Hwahyeop (화협 옹주; 和協 翁主; 1733–1752)
  - Yi Seon, Crown Prince Sado (사도세자 이선; 13 February 1735 – 12 July 1762)
  - Princess Hwawan (화완옹주; 和緩翁主; 9 March 1738 – 10 June 1808)

== Popular culture ==
- Portrayed by Kim Yoon-kyung in the 1988 MBC TV series 500 Years of the Joseon Dynasty: Memoirs of Lady Hyegyŏng.
- Portrayed by Jung Hye-sun in the 1998 MBC TV series The King's Road.
- Portrayed by Jeon Hye-jin in the 2015 film The Throne.
- Portrayed by Nam Gi-ae in the 2021 MBC TV series The Red Sleeve.
