= Crown Prince Hyojang =

Crown Prince of Joseon (1719–1728)

- King of Joseon (posthumously); Emperor of Korea (posthumously)

Crown Prince of Joseon
- Tenure: 7 April 1725 – 16 December 1728
- Investiture: Injeongjeon, Changdeokgung
- Predecessor: Crown Prince Yun
- Successor: Crown Prince Seon
- Born: 4 April 1719; Changuigung, Hanseong, Joseon
- Died: 16 December 1728 (aged 9); Jinsudang, Changgyeonggung, Hanseong, Joseon
- Burial: Yeongneung, Samneung Cluster, Paju, South Korea
- Spouse: Queen Hyosun (m. 1727)
- Issue: Jeongjo of Joseon (adopted)
Names
- Yi Haeng (이행; 李緈)
Posthumous name
- Joseon: Crown Prince Hyojang (효장세자; 孝章世子) → Great King Gakmin Onyang Yemyeong Cheolmun Hyojang (각민온량예명철문효장대왕; 恪愍溫良睿明哲文孝章大王); Korean Empire: Emperor Onyang Yemyeong Cheolmun Hyojang So (온량예명철문효장소황제; 溫良睿明哲文孝章昭皇帝); Qing dynasty: Gakmin (각민; 恪愍)
Temple name
- Jinjong (진종; 真宗)
- Clan: Jeonju Yi
- Dynasty: Yi
- Father: King Yeongjo
- Mother: Concubine Jeong (biological); Queen Jeongseong (adoptive)
- Religion: Confucianism (Neo-Confucianism)

Korean name
- Hangul: 효장세자
- Hanja: 孝章世子
- RR: Hyojang seja
- MR: Hyojang seja

Royal title
- Hangul: 경의군
- Hanja: 敬義君
- RR: Gyeonguigun
- MR: Kyŏngŭigun

Courtesy name
- Hangul: 성경
- Hanja: 聖敬
- RR: Seonggyeong
- MR: Sŏnggyŏng

Childhood name
- Hangul: 만복
- Hanja: 萬福
- RR: Manbok
- MR: Manbok

Crown Prince Hyojang (Korean: 효장세자; Hanja: 孝章世子; 4 April 1719 – 16 December 1728), personal name Yi Haeng, also known by his temple name King Jinjong, was the elder son of King Yeongjo, the 21st monarch of Joseon, and the half-brother of Crown Prince Sado. In 1764, 36 years after his death, he became the adoptive father of his nephew, the future King Jeongjo. Following the establishment of the Korean Empire, he was honored as Emperor So.

== Biography ==
Yi Haeng was the first son and second child of Prince Yeoning (posthumously King Yeongjo), by one of his concubines, a former palace lady from the Hamyang Yi clan. He was born during the reign of his grandfather King Sukjong, but his birth was not made public, because his biological grandmother, Concubine Suk, had died the previous year.

In 1720, King Sukjong was succeeded by his eldest son (posthumously King Gyeongjong). As the new king was childless, his younger half-brother, Prince Yeoning, was appointed as crown prince (왕세제; wangseje).

Yi Haeng's biological mother, Lady Yi, died the following year.

In 1724, after the death of King Gyeongjong, Prince Yeoning was enthroned as the 21st Joseon monarch. Yi Haeng was then enfeoffed as Prince Gyeongui (경의군), and in 1725, he was appointed as crown prince.

In 1726, Yeongjo selected Lady Jo, the only daughter of Jo Mun-myeong and a niece of Jo Hyeon-myeong, as his daughter-in-law.

In 1728, Yi Haeng died in Changgyeonggung, at the age of 9, after being ill for some months. The cause of his illness is unknown. His death was devastating to King Yeongjo, who later gave him the posthumous name Hyojang (효장; lit. ''filial and orderly'').

His wife outlived him by more than two decades. They are buried together in the Samneung Cluster, in Paju, Gyeonggi Province. Their tombs are known as Yeongneung (영릉).

=== After death ===
In 1735, seven years after his death, his younger half-brother, Yi Seon (posthumously Crown Prince Sado), was born. In 1762, he was imprisoned in a wooden rice chest at the order of their father, King Yeongjo, and died 8 days later, leaving his legitimate son, Yi San (posthumously King Jeongjo), as the only direct heir. Yeongjo was concerned that Yi San, being Sado's child, would be branded as "the son of a criminal" and thus become ineligible to succeed to the throne, so in 1764, he decreed that Yi San would become the adopted son of the long-dead Crown Prince Hyojang.

In 1776, King Yeongjo died and Yi San succeeded him. Surprisingly, on his enthronement day, he announced to his courtiers, "I am the son of Crown Prince Sado." In spite of this, Jeongjo respected the wishes of his grandfather and honored his adoptive father as king, granting him the temple name Jinjong (진종). Hyojang's wife, the late Crown Princess Hyosun, was also honored as queen.

== Family ==
- Father: King Yeongjo (영조대왕; 31 October 1694 – 22 April 1776)
  - Grandfather: King Sukjong (숙종대왕; 7 October 1661 – 12 July 1720)
  - Biological grandmother: Concubine Suk (숙빈), of the Haeju Choe clan (해주 최씨; 17 December 1670 – 9 April 1718)
  - Adoptive grandmother: Queen Inwon (인원왕후), of the Gyeongju Kim clan (경주 김씨; 3 November 1687 – 13 May 1757)
- Biological mother: Concubine Jeong (정빈), of the Hamyang Yi clan (함양 이씨; 1694 – 23 December 1721)
  - Grandfather: Yi Hu-cheol (이후철)
  - Grandmother: Lady, of the Gimhae Kim clan (김해 김씨)
- Adoptive mother: Queen Jeongseong (정성왕후), of the Daegu Seo clan (대구 서씨; 2 January 1693 – 23 March 1757)

Consort(s) and their respective issue

- Queen Hyosun (효순왕후), of the Pungyang Jo clan (풍양 조씨; 8 January 1716 – 31 December 1751)
  - Yi San (이산), King Jeongjo (정조대왕; 28 October 1752 – 18 August 1800), adopted son

== Ancestry ==
Ancestors of Crown Prince Hyojang

King Hyojong (효종대왕)
King Hyeonjong (현종대왕)
Queen Inseon, of the Deoksu Jang clan (인선왕후 덕수 장씨)
King Sukjong (숙종대왕)
Kim U-myeong, Internal Prince Cheongpung (청풍부원군 김우명)
Queen Myeongseong, of the Cheongpung Kim clan (명성왕후 청풍 김씨)
Internal Princess Consort Deokeun, of the Eunjin Song clan (덕은부부인 은진 송씨)
King Yeongjo (영조대왕)
Choe Tae-il (최태일)
Choe Hyo-won (최효원)
Lady, of the Pyeonggang Jang clan (평강 장씨)
Concubine Suk, of the Haeju Choe clan (숙빈 해주 최씨)
Hong Gye-nam (홍계남)
Lady, of the Namyang Hong clan (남양 홍씨)
Lady, of the Gangneung Kim clan (강릉 김씨)
Crown Prince Hyojang
Yi Eon-yang (이언양)
Yi Sin-seon (이신선)
Lady, of the Ansan Yi clan (안산 이씨)
Yi Hu-cheol (이후철)
Lady, of the Gyeongju Kim clan (경주 김씨)
Concubine Jeong, of the Hamyang Yi clan (정빈 함양 이씨)
Kim Myeong-sil (김명실)
Kim Mae-il (김매일)
Lady, of the Gimhae Kim clan (김해 김씨)
Yi Gap-saeng (이갑생)
Lady, of Cheolseong Yi clan (철성 이씨)

== See also ==
- History of Korea
- Styles and titles in Joseon
- Politics of Joseon
