= The Red Sleeve =

2021 South Korean television series

- Promotional poster
- Hangul: 옷소매 붉은 끝동
- Lit.: The Red Sleeve Cuff
- RR: Otsomae bulgeun kkeutdong
- MR: Ossomae pulgŭn kkŭttong
- Genre: Romance; Historical drama
- Created by: Kim Ho-young (MBC Drama)
- Based on: The Red Sleeve Cuff by Kang Mi-kang
- Written by: Jung Hae-ri
- Directed by: Jung Ji-in; Song Yeon-hwa
- Creative directors: Moon Ju-hee; Oh Tteu-rak
- Starring: Lee Jun-ho; Lee Se-young; Kang Hoon
- Composer: Noh Hyung-woo
- Country of origin: South Korea
- Original language: Korean
- No. of episodes: 17

Production
- Executive producers: Kim Yeon-seong; Kim Do-kyun; Han Jae-hun
- Producers: Lee Hyun-wook; Pyo Jong-rok; Lee Wol-yeon
- Running time: 70 minutes
- Production companies: WeMad; Npio Entertainment
- Budget: ₩16 billion

Original release
- Network: MBC TV
- Release: November 12, 2021 – January 1, 2022

The Red Sleeve (Korean: 옷소매 붉은 끝동) is a South Korean television series starring Lee Jun-ho, Lee Se-young, and Kang Hoon. It is a fictionalised account of the lives of King Jeongjo and Consort Ui. It aired on MBC TV from November 12, 2021, to January 1, 2022, every Friday and Saturday at 22:00 (KST).

== Synopsis ==
Based on a novel of the same name, The Red Sleeve tells the story of a royal court romance between the king of Joseon who places his duty to his country above love, and a court lady who wants to protect the life she has chosen. The story is told from the viewpoint of the court lady.

== Cast ==
=== Main ===
- Lee Jun-ho as Yi San, later King Jeongjo
  - Lee Joo-won as young Yi San

The arrogant and perfectionist grandson of King Yeongjo. He constantly strives to become a benevolent king, but his father's death has left an emotional trauma in his heart.

- Lee Se-young as Seong Deok-im, later First Senior Consort Ui
  - Lee Seol-ah as young Seong Deok-im

A court lady who wants to live the life of her choice, rather than just be one of the numerous court ladies called "the king's women".

- Kang Hoon as Hong Deok-ro
  - Choi Jeong-hoo as young Deok-ro

Yi San's teacher who hides a cold personality beneath his warm-hearted appearance.

=== Supporting ===
==== Royal family ====
- Lee Deok-hwa as King Yeongjo

Yi San's grandfather.

- Jang Hee-jin as Queen Kim

King Yeongjo's second legitimate wife.

- Kang Mal-geum as Crown Princess Hye

Yi San's mother.

- Kim I-on as Princess Cheongyeon

Yi San's first younger sister.

- Jo Seung-hee as Princess Cheongseon

Yi San's second younger sister.

- Go Ha as Second Junior Consort Moon

King Yeongjo's concubine.

- Park Seo-kyung as Hong Dan, later First Senior Consort Won

Hong Deok-ro's younger sister who becomes Yi San's concubine.

- Yi Seo as First Senior Consort Hwa

Yi San's concubine.

==== Court ladies ====
- Kim Ja-young as Court Lady Kwon
- Park Jung-eon as Consort Yeong's court lady
- Jeon Yeo-jin as Queen Kim's court lady
- Gil Sung-joo as Mi-yook, Consort Hwa's maid
- Park Seung-ah as Yang-soon, Consort Hwa's maid
- Park Ji-young as Head Court Lady Jo
- Ji Eun as Kang Wol-hye
- Cha Mi-kyung as Court Lady Park

==== People around Yi San ====
- Oh Dae-hwan as Kang Tae-ho
- Moon Jeong-dae as Seo Gye-jung
- Bae Je-ki as Jung Jae-hwa
- Kim Kang-min as Kim Du-seong
- Yoon Hyo-sik as Yi San's head eunuch

==== People around Seong Deok-im ====
- Jang Hye-jin as Court Lady Seo
- Lee Min-ji as Kim Bok-yeon
  - Yoon Hae-bin as young Kim Bok-yeon
- Ha Yul-ri as Bae Kyung-hee
  - Lee Seo-hyun as young Bae Kyung-hee
- Lee Eun-saem as Son Young-hee
  - Jo Si-yeon as young Seo Young-hee
- Yang Byung-yeol as Seong Sik
  - Lee Seung-Woo as young Seong Sik

Seong Deok-im's elder brother.

==== Yi San's political opponents ====
- Jo Hee-bong as Hong Jung-yeo
- Seo Hyo-rim as Princess Hwawan

Yi San's aunt.

- Kwon Hyun-bin as Jeong Baek-ik

Princess Hwawan's adopted son.

=== Extended ===
- Jo Chan-hyung as Yi San's guard
- Kim Ja-young as Court Lady Kwon
- Kim Byung-chun as Shim Hwi-won

=== Special appearances ===
- Ha Seok-jin as a magistrate
- Do Sang-woo as Crown Prince Sado

Yi San's father.

- Nam Gi-ae as First Senior Consort Yeong

Yi San's biological grandmother and King Yeongjo's beloved concubine.

- Lee Soon-jae as an elderly citizen

== Production and release ==
The lead roles were initially offered to Kim Kyung-nam and Park Hye-su. The first script reading of the cast was held in May 2021.

The series was originally scheduled to premiere on November 5, 2021, but it was delayed by a week due to program adjustment for the broadcast of a professional baseball game.

On December 9, 2021, it was announced that the series would be extended by one episode due to its popularity and would end with 17 episodes. Due to the extension, episode 13 aired on December 24, while episodes 14 and 15 aired on December 25.

It was reported that filming started in May 2021 and continued for about seven months until December 21. It was mainly conducted at the Mungyeong Saejae Open Set, Jeonju Hanok Village, Gwanghallu Garden in Namwon, Naganeupseong Folk Village, Yeokrin Set in Damyang County, and Yeolhwajeong Pavilion in Boseong County.

== Original soundtrack ==
The Red Sleeve

Soundtrack album by Various
- Released: 2021–2022
- Recorded: 2021
- Genre: Soundtrack
- Languages: Korean; English
- Labels: Kakao; Toon Studio

=== Part 1 ===
Released on November 19, 2021
No.	Title	Lyrics	Music	Artist	Length
1.	"I Wish" (바라고 바라)	Kim Ho-kyung	Jung Seung-hyun (1601); Park Tae-hyun (1601)	Wheein	4:01
2.	"I Wish" (바라고 바라; Inst.)		Jung Seung-hyun (1601); Park Tae-hyun (1601)		4:01
Total length:					8:02

=== Part 2 ===
Released on November 28, 2021
No.	Title	Lyrics	Music	Artist	Length
1.	"Starlight Heart" (잠들지 않는 별)	TH; Jung Soo-min	Jung Soo-min	Ben	4:02
2.	"Starlight Heart" (잠들지 않는 별; Inst.)		Jung Soo-min		4:02
Total length:					8:04

=== Part 3 ===
Released on November 30, 2021
No.	Title	Lyrics	Music	Artist	Length
1.	"My Wonderous Miracle" (네가 나의 기적인 것처럼)	Baek Seung-jae	Baek Seung-jae; Dr. Son	Jeong Se-woon	3:15
2.	"My Wonderous Miracle" (네가 나의 기적인 것처럼; Inst.)		Baek Seung-jae; Dr. Son		3:15
Total length:					6:30

=== Part 4 ===
Released on December 5, 2021
No.	Title	Lyrics	Music	Artist	Length
1.	"I'll Be with You Every Day" (모든 날을 너와 함께 할게)	Noheul; Baek Ma-li	Noheul; Baek Ma-li	Minhyun (NU'EST)	3:51
2.	"I'll Be with You Every Day" (모든 날을 너와 함께 할게; Inst.)		Noheul; Baek Ma-li		3:51
Total length:					7:42

=== Part 5 ===
Released on December 12, 2021
No.	Title	Lyrics	Music	Artist	Length
1.	"Beautiful" (비로소 아름다워)	Kim Ho-kyung	Jeong Seung-hyeon (1601); Park Tae-hyun (1601)	Shim Kyu-sun (Lucia)	4:40
2.	"Beautiful" (비로소 아름다워; Inst.)		Jeong Seung-hyeon (1601); Park Tae-hyun (1601)		4:40
Total length:					9:20

=== Part 6 ===
Released on December 18, 2021
No.	Title	Lyrics	Music	Artist	Length
1.	"Every Step You Take" (내가 한 걸음 뒤로 갈게)	Humbler; Lee Seung-ho	Humbler; Lee Seung-ho	Jeon Sang-geun	4:04
2.	"Every Step You Take" (내가 한 걸음 뒤로 갈게; Inst.)		Humbler; Lee Seung-ho		4:04
Total length:					8:08

=== Part 7 ===
Released on December 20, 2021
No.	Title	Lyrics	Music	Artist	Length
1.	"I'm Still" (네가 불어오는 이곳에서 난 여전히)	Kim Ho-kyung	Jeong Seung-hyeon (1601); Park Tae-hyun (1601)	Xia	3:42
2.	"I'm Still" (네가 불어오는 이곳에서 난 여전히; Inst.)		Jeong Seung-hyeon (1601); Park Tae-hyun (1601)		3:42
Total length:					7:24

=== Part 8 ===
Released on January 1, 2022
No.	Title	Lyrics	Music	Artist	Length
1.	"I'll Leave You" (그대 손 놓아요)	Yoon Da-on	Lee Do-hyung (Lohi); Yoon Da-on	Lee Sun-hee	3:54
2.	"I'll Leave You" (그대 손 놓아요; Inst.)		Lee Do-hyung (Lohi); Yoon Da-on		3:54
Total length:					7:48

=== Part 9 ===
Released on January 3, 2022
No.	Title	Lyrics	Music	Artist	Length
1.	"Always Be Your Star" (밝혀줄게 별처럼)	Humbler; Eo Young-soo; Kim Seong-hyun	Humbler; Eo Young-soo; Kim Seong-hyun	Lia (Itzy)	3:46
2.	"Always Be Your Star" (밝혀줄게 별처럼; Inst.)		Humbler; Eo Young-soo; Kim Seong-hyun		3:46
Total length:					7:32

== Viewership ==
The Red Sleeve : South Korea viewers per episode (millions)

Season	Episode number																	Average
Season	1	2	3	4	5	6	7	8	9	10	11	12	13	14	15	16	17	Average
1	0.992	1.111	1.308	1.417	1.501	1.696	1.937	1.998	1.930	1.918	2.242	2.522	2.399	2.516	2.749	3.534	3.668	2.081

Source: Audience measurement performed nationwide by Nielsen Korea.

Average TV viewership ratings
Ep.	Original broadcast date	Average audience share		
Ep.	Original broadcast date	Nielsen Korea		TNmS
Ep.	Original broadcast date	Nationwide	Seoul	Nationwide
1	November 12, 2021	5.7% (12th)	5.7% (10th)	N/A
2	November 13, 2021	5.6% (11th)	5.2% (8th)	4.8% (15th)
3	November 19, 2021	7.0% (9th)	6.3% (10th)	6.6% (9th)
4	November 20, 2021	7.5% (4th)	7.6% (3rd)	6.3% (9th)
5	November 26, 2021	8.8% (4th)	8.1% (4th)	6.7% (11th)
6	November 27, 2021	9.4% (2nd)	8.5% (2nd)	N/A
7	December 3, 2021	10.7% (2nd)	10.5% (2nd)	N/A
8	December 4, 2021	10.5% (2nd)	10.3% (2nd)	7.8% (2nd)
9	December 10, 2021	10.9% (3rd)	10.9% (3rd)	8.9% (7th)
10	December 11, 2021	10.2% (2nd)	10.2% (2nd)	9.1% (2nd)
11	December 17, 2021	12.8% (2nd)	12.7% (2nd)	10.8% (3rd)
12	December 18, 2021	13.3% (2nd)	13.6% (2nd)	10.2% (2nd)
13	December 24, 2021	12.8% (2nd)	12.8% (2nd)	10.8% (4th)
14	December 25, 2021	13.0% (3rd)	12.7% (3rd)	N/A
15	December 25, 2021	14.3% (2nd)	13.8% (2nd)	N/A
16	January 1, 2022	17.0% (3rd)	16.4% (3rd)	12.3% (2nd)
17	January 1, 2022	17.4% (2nd)	16.8% (2nd)	11.8% (3rd)
Average		11%	10.7%	8.8% (Note: This average ratings is calculated based on the published ratings, the exact average ratings is unknown due to multiple ratings not published.)
In the table above, the blue numbers represent the lowest ratings and the red numbers represent the highest ratings.; N/A denotes ratings that were not released.

== Awards and nominations ==
Name of the award ceremony, year presented, category, nominee of the award, and the result of the nomination
Award ceremony	Year	Category	Nominee(s) / Work	Result	Ref.
APAN Star Awards	2022	Best Director	Jung Ji-in and Song Yeon-hwa	Won	
APAN Star Awards	2022	Drama of the Year	The Red Sleeve	Won	
APAN Star Awards	2022	Top Excellence Award, Actor in a Miniseries	Lee Jun-ho	Won	
APAN Star Awards	2022	Best Writer	Jung Hae-ri	Nominated	
APAN Star Awards	2022	Excellence Award, Actress in a Miniseries	Lee Se-young	Nominated	
Asia Artist Awards	2022	Grand Prize (Daesang) – Actor of the Year	Lee Jun-ho	Won	
Baeksang Arts Awards	2022	Best Actor	Lee Jun-ho	Won	
Baeksang Arts Awards	2022	Best Actress	Lee Se-young	Nominated	
Baeksang Arts Awards	2022	Best Director	Jung Ji-in	Nominated	
Baeksang Arts Awards	2022	Best Drama	The Red Sleeve	Nominated	
Baeksang Arts Awards	2022	Best Supporting Actor	Lee Deok-hwa	Nominated	
Baeksang Arts Awards	2022	Best Supporting Actress	Jang Hye-jin	Nominated	
Baeksang Arts Awards	2022	Technical Award	Kim Hwa-young (Cinematography)	Nominated	
Bechdel Day	2022	Bechdel's Choice 5	The Red Sleeve	Won	
Bechdel Day	2022	Best Director	Jung Ji-in	Won	
Korea Broadcasting Awards	2022	Best TV Drama	The Red Sleeve	Won	
Korea Communications Commission Broadcasting Awards	2022	Grand Prize	The Red Sleeve	Won	
Korea Communications Standards Commission	2022	Terrestrial TV Division – Good Program of the Month (January)	The Red Sleeve	Won	
Korea Drama Awards	2022	Top Excellence Award, Actor	Lee Jun-ho	Nominated	
Korea PD Awards	2022	Best Actor	Lee Jun-ho	Won	
Korea PD Awards	2022	Best TV Drama	The Red Sleeve	Won	
MBC Drama Awards	2021	Best Couple	Lee Jun-ho and Lee Se-young	Won	
MBC Drama Awards	2021	Best New Actor	Kang Hoon	Won	
MBC Drama Awards	2021	Best Supporting Actress	Jang Hye-jin	Won	
MBC Drama Awards	2021	Best Writer Award	Jung Hae-ri	Won	
MBC Drama Awards	2021	Drama of the Year	The Red Sleeve	Won	
MBC Drama Awards	2021	Lifetime Achievement Award	Lee Deok-hwa	Won	
MBC Drama Awards	2021	Top Excellence Award, Actor in a Miniseries	Lee Jun-ho	Won	
MBC Drama Awards	2021	Top Excellence Award, Actress in a Miniseries	Lee Se-young	Won	
MBC Drama Awards	2021	Best New Actress	Ha Yul-ri	Nominated	
MBC Drama Awards	2021	Best Supporting Actor	Oh Dae-hwan	Nominated	
MBC Drama Awards	2021	Excellence Award, Actor in a Miniseries	Kang Hoon	Nominated	
MBC Drama Awards	2021	Excellence Award, Actress in a Miniseries	Park Ji-young	Nominated	
Popular Culture and Art Production Staff Award	2022	Minister of Culture, Sports and Tourism Awards	Kim Eun-young	Won	
Seoul International Drama Awards	2022	Outstanding Korean Drama	The Red Sleeve	Won	
