= Injeongjeon =

Building in Changdeokgung, Seoul, South Korea

- The building (2026)

General information
- Location: Changdeokgung, Seoul, South Korea
- Coordinates: 37.579°N 126.991°E
- Completed: c. 1405

Design and construction
- Designations

National Treasure (South Korea)
- Official name: Injeongjeon Hall of Changdeokgung Palace
- Designated: 1985-01-08

Korean name
- Hangul: 인정전
- Hanja: 仁政殿
- Lit.: Hall of Benevolent Governance
- RR: Injeongjeon
- MR: Injŏngjŏn

Injeongjeon (Korean: 인정전; Hanja: 仁政殿; lit. 'Hall of Benevolent Governance') is the throne hall and main building of the palace Changdeokgung in Seoul, South Korea. It is a designated National Treasure of South Korea. It was built around c. 1405 and was destroyed and rebuilt a number of times thereafter. Its current iteration was built in 1804.

== Description ==
It is a single story, two-tiered structure with a large open ceiling. It stands on a wŏltae (월대; elevated stone podium). Major state events were held at this building and its front courtyard, such as enthronement ceremonies. It is designed to accept energy from Korea's mountains and watersheds. On its roof exterior are five Imperial Seals of Korea that were possibly added by the final Korean monarch Emperor Sunjong (r. 1907–1910).

== History ==
The Encyclopedia of Korean Culture writes that the building was first built in 1405. According to historians Lee et al., the building was destroyed by fire in 1403 and rebuilt the following year. One of its buildings burned down in 1411, which destroyed many Goryeo-era documents. It was expanded and completed on the 7th day, 7th month of 1418. It was renovated in 1452. It was destroyed during the 1592–1598 Imijn War and spared during the 1623 Injo coup. It was destroyed in a fire on the 13th day, 12th month of 1803 and rebuilt on the 17th day, 12th month of 1804. This version of the building has persisted until the present, although it was renovated over time. It was renovated between 1854 and 1857. It was significantly renovated and its annexes were significantly renovated or demolished around 1907 to 1909.

The building was made a National Treasure of South Korea on January 8, 1985.
