= Queen Jeongseong =

Queen of Joseon from 1724 to 1757

Queen Jeongseong 정성왕후(貞聖王后)

Queen consort of Joseon
- Tenure: 16 October 1724 – 23 March 1757
- Predecessor: Queen Seonui
- Successor: Queen Jeongsun

Crown Princess of Joseon
- Tenure: 15 November 1721 – 16 October 1724
- Predecessor: Crown Princess Eo
- Successor: Crown Princess Jo
- Born: 2 January 1693; Gahoebang, Hanseong, Joseon
- Died: 23 March 1757 (aged 64); Gwanrigak, Daejojeon Hall, Changdeokgung, Hanseong, Joseon
- Burial: Hongneung Tomb, Seooneung Cluster, Goyang, Gyeonggi Province, South Korea
- Spouse: Yeongjo of Joseon (m. 1703)
- Issue: Yi Haeng, King Jinjong of Joseon (adoptive); Yi Seon, King Jangjo of Joseon (adoptive)
Posthumous name
- 혜경 장신 강선 공익 인휘 소헌 원렬 단목장화 정성왕후; 惠敬莊愼康宣恭翼仁徽昭獻元烈端穆章和貞聖王后
- Clan: Daegu Seo clan (by birth); Jeonju Yi clan (by marriage)
- Dynasty: House of Yi
- Father: Seo Jong-jae, Internal Prince Dalseong
- Mother: Internal Princess Consort Jamseong of the Ubong Yi clan
- Religion: Korean Buddhism
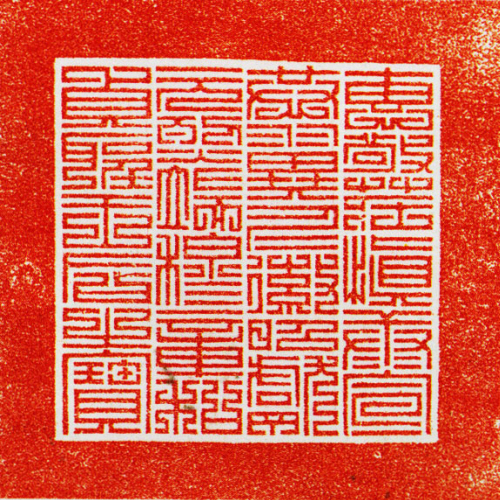
- Seal

Queen Jeongseong (Korean: 정성왕후 서씨; 2 January 1693 – 23 March 1757), of the Daegu Seo clan, was the first wife of King Yeongjo of Joseon and the adoptive mother of Crown Prince Sado.

== Biography ==
It's said the queen was born on 12 January 1693 in Gahoebang (가회방; 嘉會坊), Hanseong. She was the second daughter and fourth child of Seo Jong-jae and Lady Yi of the Ubong Yi clan.

In November 1703, at the age of ten, she married the eight-year-old Prince Yeoning. As the wife of a prince, she was given the title of Princess Consort Dalseong (달성군부인; 達城郡夫人).

In 1720, her husband was appointed as Crown Prince (왕세제; 王世弟). As his wife, she was given the title Crown Princess Consort (왕세제빈). On their first night of marriage, it was said that Prince Yeoning had asked how were the hands of the princess so pretty. The princess responded by saying that she never did any labor to get them dirty. This comment had unsettled the Prince because it reminded him of his mother, Royal Noble Consort Suk.

It was said that from then on to her death as Queen, the Princess was not visited much from the Prince.

In 1724, Prince Yeoning's older brother, King Gyeongjong died. Prince Yeoning ascended the throne on 30 August of that year as King Yeongjo and she became his queen consort.

As queen, it was said that she held a generous character to her. The Queen had also cherished and treated Crown Prince Hyojang, Yi Jeong-bin's son, and Crown Prince Sado, Yi Yeong-bin’s son, as if they were her own sons.

The Queen died at Changdeok Palace on 3 April 1757, and is buried in Seoreung within Hongreung in Yongdu-gong, Deokyang ward, Goyang, Gyeonggi Province. King Yeongjo had her buried near his father, Sukjong of Joseon, in Myeongreung. But because her tomb was built before her husband died, King Yeongjo reserved a spot next her mound intending to be buried with her.

However, when King Yeongjo died in 1776, King Jeongjo was conscious of the Queen Dowager, and built Wonreung to bury the former King and later, the late Queen Dowager. As a result, Queen Jeongseong is buried there alone.

Queen Jeongseong had no biological children. But her death distressed her adoptive son, Crown Prince Sado. As well as the death of her legal mother-in-law, Queen Dowager Hyesun, who died one month later on 2 May 1757 which contributed to the Crown Prince’s declining mental condition.

== Family ==
Parent

- Father − Seo Jong-jae (서종제; 徐宗悌; 1656–1719)
- Mother − Internal Princess Consort Jamseong of the Ubong Yi clan (잠성부부인 우봉 이씨; 岑城府夫人 牛峰李氏; 1660–1738)

Sibling(s)

- Older brother − Seo Myeong-baek (서명백; 徐命伯; 1678–1738)
- Older sister − Lady Seo of the Daegu Seo clan
- Older brother − Seo Myeong-hyu (서명휴; 徐命休; 1686–?)
- Younger sister − Lady Seo of the Daegu Seo clan (1696–?)
- Younger sister − Lady Seo of the Daegu Seo clan (1698–?)

== In popular culture ==
- Portrayed by Kim Ae-kyung in the 1988 MBC TV series 500 Years of Joseon: Memoirs of Lady Hyegyeong
- Portrayed by Moon Ye-ji in the 1998 MBC TV series The King's Road
- Portrayed by Jung Mo-rye and Shin Gyu-ri in the 2010 MBC TV series Dong Yi
- Portrayed by Park Shin-hye in the 2014 film The Royal Tailor
- Portrayed by Park Myung-shin in the 2015 film The Throne
- Portrayed by Kim Sun-kyung in the 2017 MBC TV series The Emperor: Owner of the Mask
- Portrayed by Choi Soo-im in the 2019 SBS TV series Haechi

Queen Jeongseong Daegu Seo clan
Royal titles
Preceded by Queen Seonui of the Hamjong-Eo clan	Queen consort of Joseon; 30 November 1724 – 3 April 1757	Succeeded by Queen Jeongsun of the Gyeongju-Kim clan
