= Jeonju Yi clan =

Korean clan from North Jeolla Province

- Country: Korea
- Current region: Jeonju
- Founder: Yi Han
- Website: rfo.co.kr

The Jeonju Yi clan or Jeonju Lee clan (Korean: 전주 이씨; Hanja: 全州 李氏) is a Korean clan with the surname Yi. Their bon-gwan is in Jeonju, North Jeolla Province. The clan includes the House of Yi that led Joseon and the Korean Empire.

Their founder was Yi Han. He was Minister of Works (사공; 司空) during the Silla Dynasty and became the ancestor of a prestigious and powerful clan that held influence from the Unified Silla period to the Goryeo period.

While there are no clear records of the ancestors of Yi Han, the founder of the Jeonju Yi clan, there are theories that he originated from the imperial family of the Tang Dynasty in China and lived in Jeonju after he came to Silla or that he branched off from the Gyeongju Yi clan, a native Silla clan.

Yi Han's descendant, Yi Sŏng-gye, seized power in a military coup and founded Joseon in 14th century.

In the 21st century, the Jeonju Lee Royal Family Association manages the affairs of the clan.

== Notable people of history ==
- Lee Beom-seok, Korean independence activist and politician
- Lee Bong-chang, Korean independence activist
- Yi Ŏkki, Joseon naval commander during the Imjin War
- Yi Je-ma, Korean medicine scholar during the late Joseon period
- Yi Su-gwang, Joseon military official and diplomat (?)
- Yi Ŭi-bang, military ruler of Korea during the Goryeo period

== Notable contemporary people ==
- Lee Ahyumi, South Korean singer and actress
- Lee Chae-yeon, South Korean singer
- Lee Hoi-chang, South Korean lawyer and politician
- Lee Ji-eun, (better known as IU), South Korean singer-songwriter and actress
- Lee Jun-ho, South Korean singer-songwriter and actor, member of boy band 2PM
- Lee Ki-poong, South Korean politician
- Lee Kyung-kyu, South Korean comedian and actor
- Lee Man-hee, founder and leader of the Shincheonji Church of Jesus, a new religious movement
- Syngman Rhee, South Korean politician
- Yi Seok, South Korean entrepreneur
- Yi Tjoune, Korean prosecutor and diplomat

== See also ==
- House of Yi
- Lee (Korean surname)
