= Hyochang Park =

Park in Seoul, South Korea

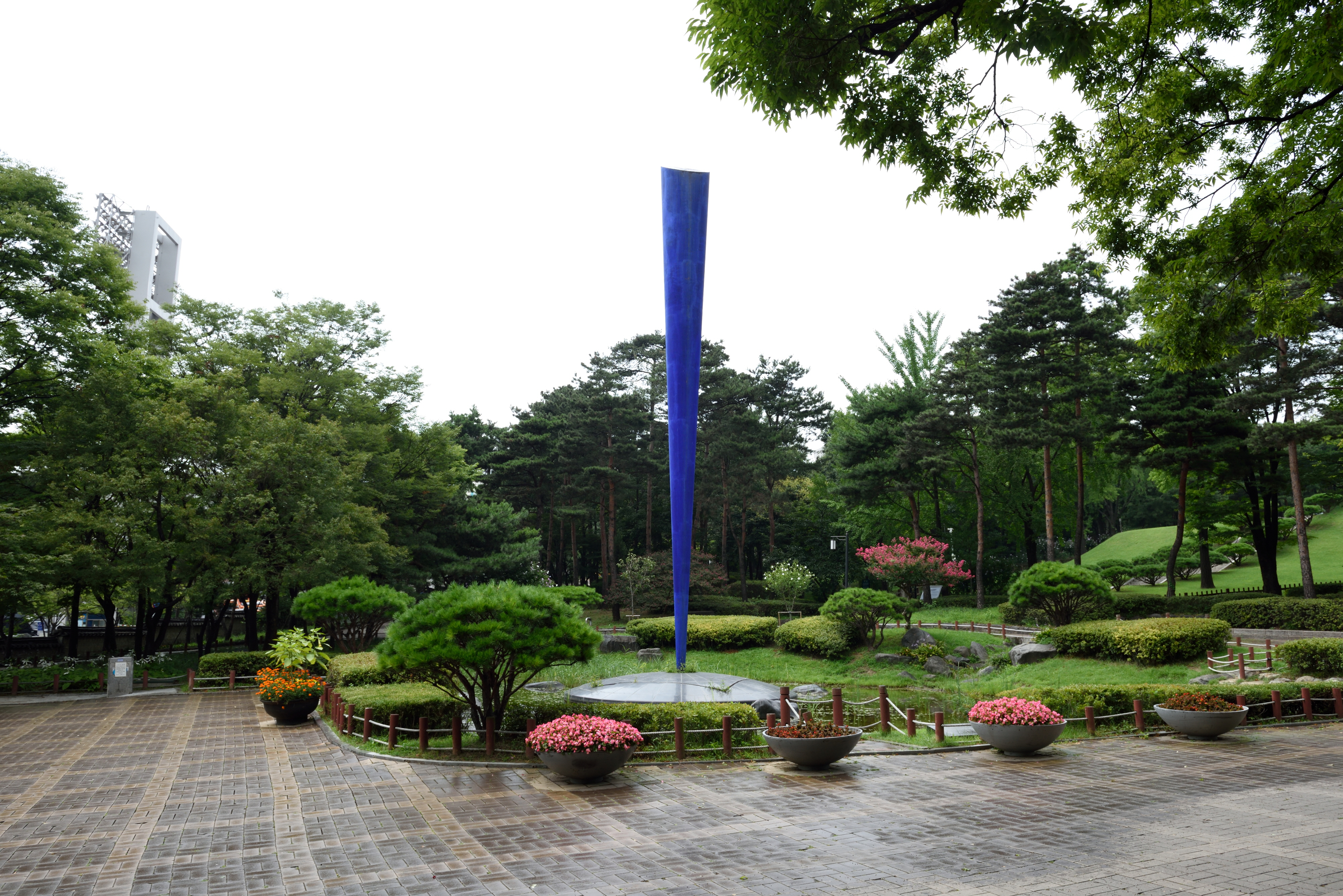
- Statue in the park (2015)
- Interactive map of Hyochang Park
- Location: 04311 177-18, Hyochangwon-ro, Yongsan District, Seoul, South Korea
- Coordinates: 37°32′42″N 126°57′40″E
- Area: 12.33 ha (30.47 acres)
- Established: Park (1924); Cemetery (1786)
- Etymology: "Filial and prosperous"
- Administrator: Government of Yongsan District
- Open: Every day
- Public transit: Hyochang Park station

Historic Sites of South Korea
- Designated: 1989-06-08
- Reference no.: 330

Korean name
- Hangul: 효창공원
- Hanja: 孝昌公園
- RR: Hyochang gongwon
- MR: Hyoch'ang kongwŏn

Hyochang Park (Note: Also "Hyochang Neighborhood Park" (효창근린공원) or "Seoul Hyochang Park".) (Korean: 효창공원) is a park in Yongsan District, Seoul, South Korea. Established in 1876 as a cemetery for the Joseon royal family, it is now simultaneously a park for leisure and a memorial for the Korean independence movement. In 1989, the park was designated a Historic Site of South Korea.

The area went by a number of names in its early history, including "Hyochangmyo", "Hyochangwon", and "Kuyongsan'goji". Crown Prince Munhyo, his biological mother Uibin Seong, and several other royal family members were buried in the area in the 19th century.

In 1921, the Japanese colonial government turned the park into the first golf course in Korea, with the graves left directly on the course. It was first designated a park in 1940, and the graves were moved out of the park in 1944. After the 1945 liberation, the remains of eight significant Korean independence activists were buried in the park. There has since been continual conflict over whether the park should be used for recreation or as a memorial to the independence movement.

The park contains the first stadium constructed by South Korea, Hyochang Stadium, and the Kim Koo Museum. It is located near exit 1 of Hyochang Park station of the Seoul Metropolitan Subway.

== Description ==
The area of the park is 12.3307 hectares (30.47 acres). The park contains a large pine forest and cherry blossom trees. In total there are over 100,000 trees of at least 70 species. A variety of swing benches are located in the park. In the park is a blue pillar rising from a small lake, symbolizing the communication between people and the source of life: water. Also in the park is a statue of the Silla-era intellectual Wonhyo.

It is a popular spot for exercise. The park contains such amenities as children's playgrounds, badminton courts, and a senior citizens' association (대한노인회).

The park is an eight to ten minute walk from Exit 1 of Hyochang Park Station on the Seoul Subway Line 6 and the Gyeongui–Jungang Line. Surrounded by a dense urban environment. the park is near Hyochang Children's Park and Hyochang Stadium, the first stadium constructed after the founding of South Korea. To the east of Hyochang Park is Sookmyung Women's University.

The park and the stadium is designated as a neighborhood park, with most of the park area being designated as Cultural Heritage Protection Area. A 2007 paper called for new building restrictions, criticizing nearby tall and noisy structures such as restaurants, a golf practice facility, Sookmyung Women's University, and the stadium lights.

=== Memorials to the Korean independence movement ===
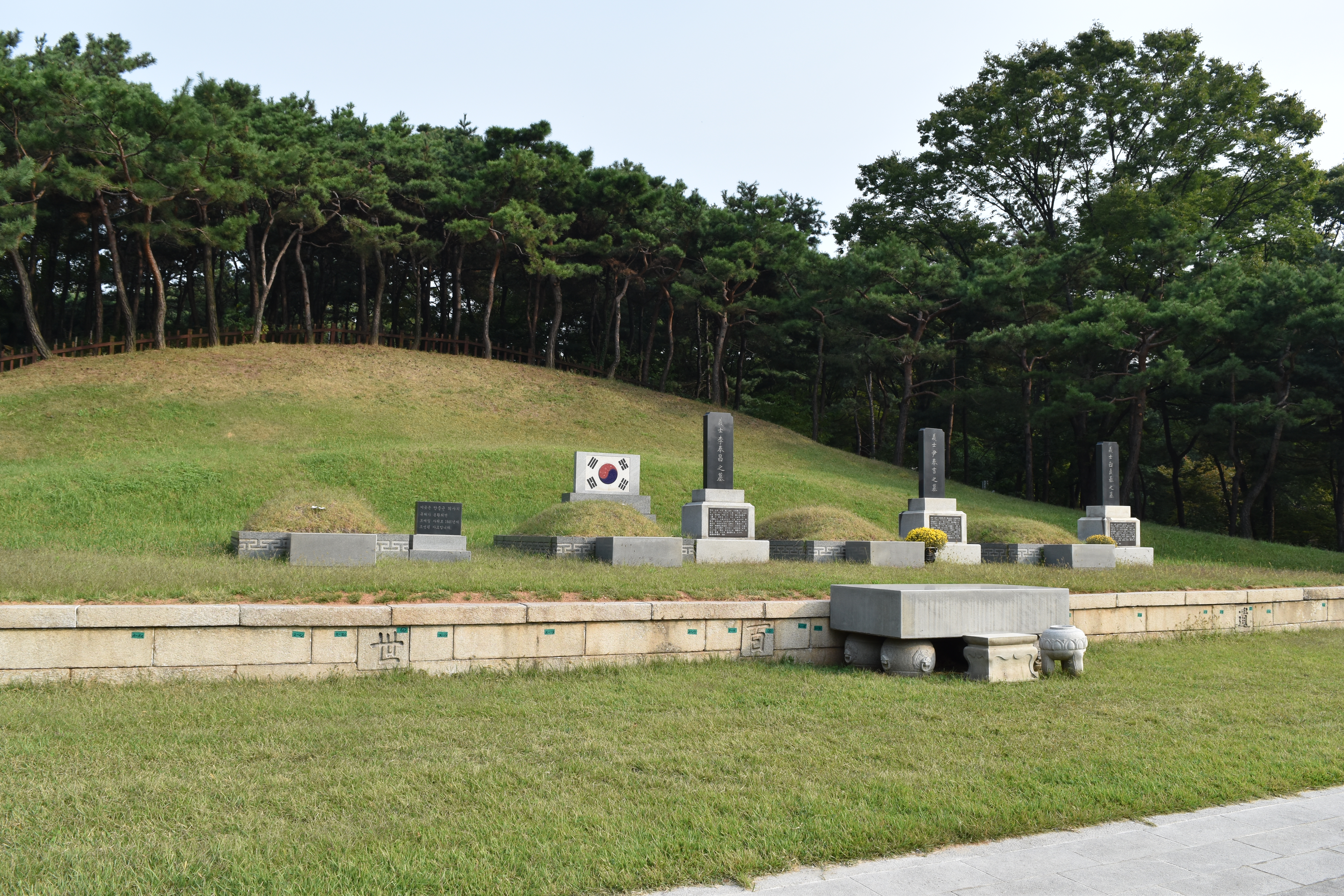
Tombs of the Three Martyrs (2016). On the left is an empty tomb reserved for An Jung-geun, whose remains are missing.

Eight prominent Korean independence activists are buried in the park. The graves of Lee Bong-chang, Yun Bong-gil, and Baek Jeong-gi are known as the Graves of the Three Martyrs (삼의사묘; 三義士墓). On the barrier wall beneath the graves, the text "遺芳百世" (유방백세) is written, which can be translated as "[They] paved a path of beauty for future generations". An empty grave for An Jung-geun is located right next to these three, as his remains have yet to be recovered as of 2021. (Note: This is in spite of a number of both private and government efforts to locate his remains, including a rare joint North-South Korean effort in 2006.) Kim Ku is also buried in the park. In the vicinity of these graves are Hibiscus syriacus plants (the national flower), dedicated to each of these figures. Lee's sign indicates that Lee had played in the park in his youth. Yun's was planted at the same time (11:40 am) and on the anniversary of the 1932 Hongkou Park Incident that he participated in. Other activists buried in the park includes Yi Dong-nyeong, Cha Ri-seok, Cho Seong-hwan. Memorial services are held annually.

The park contains the Kim Koo Museum, which opened in October 2002. A statue of Lee Bong-chang stands in front of the museum. Also in the park is the hanok-style temple Uiyeolsa (의열사; 義烈祠), where seven independence activists are enshrined. In addition, the gate Changyeolmun (창열문; 彰烈門) is at the park. Each year around the anniversary of the March First Movement, trees next to the park are decorated with South Korean flags.

== History ==
=== Joseon ===
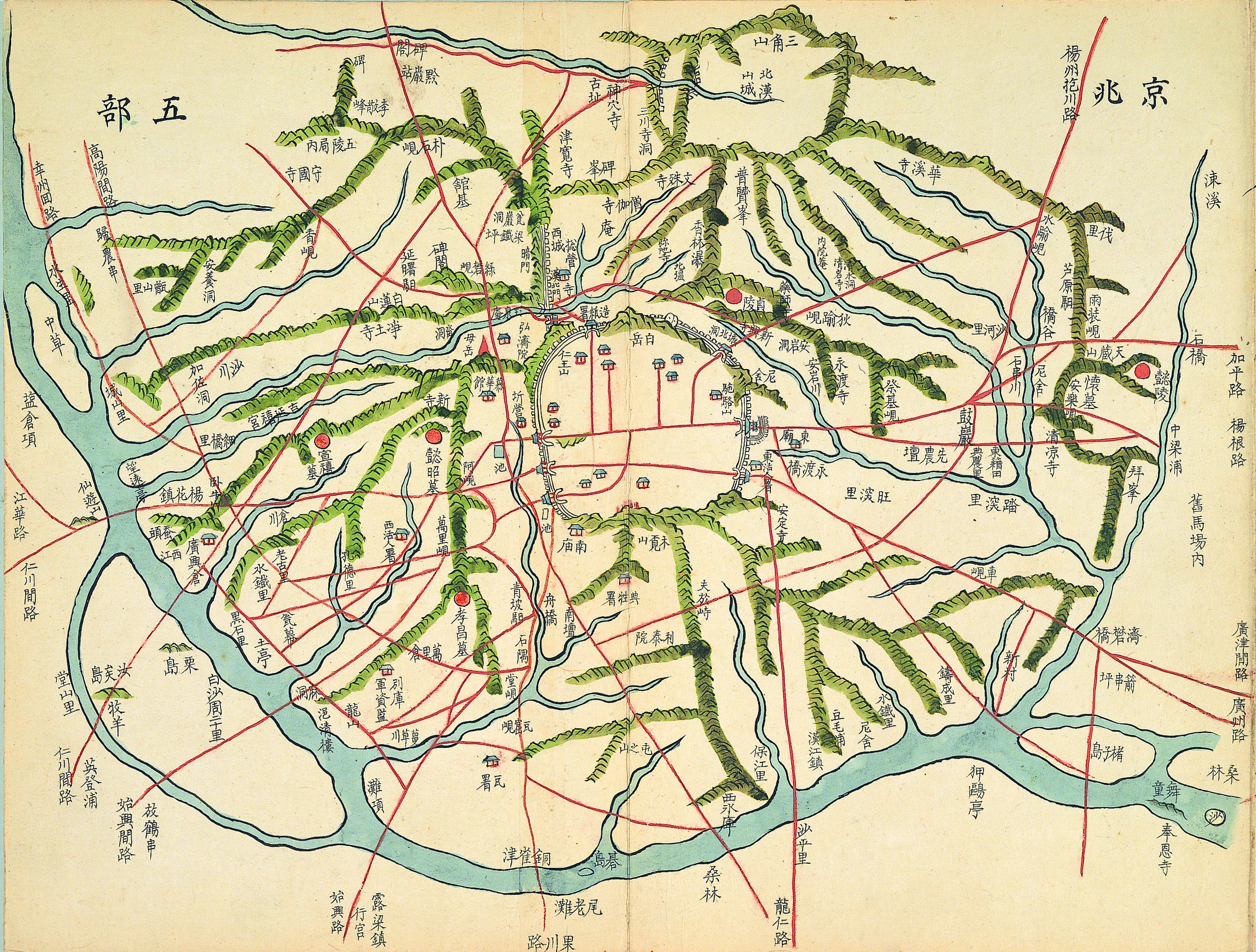

Hyochangwon marked in a 19th century map of Seoul (circled)

According to the Annals of King Jeongjo, Crown Prince Munhyo, the four-year-old first son of King Jeongjo, was buried at the area during the Joseon period in 1786. Jeongjo wanted the location of the grave to be auspicious and close to the palace. He, some servants, and experts in feng shui searched for a suitable location. Jeongjo reportedly visited the eventual location of the tomb thrice, then decided that he was pleased with the sunny hill, forest, and view of the Han River at the site. The area is situated in a line of mountains that begin from Samgaksan in the north. The design and location of the tomb are reportedly described in detail in an 1786 report. (Note: Entitled 효세자묘소도감의궤; 文孝世子墓所都監儀軌.)

The area was then called "Hyochangmyo" (효창묘; 孝昌墓; lit. 'Hyochang Cemetery'), where "Hyochang" was Munhyo's temple name and means "filial and prosperous" ("효성스럽고 번성하다"). The crown prince's mother, Royal Noble Consort Uibin Seong, died five months later and was buried in a tomb close by. Princess Yeongon was buried in the area in 1829, and her mother Royal Consort Sugui Park was buried there in 1854. (Note: The former locations of the princess' and royal consort's graves are currently not in the park; they are in a residential area to the northeast.) In 1870, King Gojong renamed the area to "Hyochangwon" (효창원; 孝昌園 (Note: Won (원; 園) is a term that refers to the tombs of royal family members who were not monarchs.)). During the late Joseon and Korean Empire period, the surrounding area was called Aegirŭng (애기릉).

The area was heavily disturbed during the 1894–1895 First Sino-Japanese War, 1904–1905 Russo-Japanese War, and by Japan's increasing presence in Korea. In May 1894, Japanese general Ōshima Yoshimasa stationed troops in the area and removed a portion of the woods. In 1906, when Korea was under Japanese residency, the Japanese military established a military base, railroad, and brothel just to the south of the area.

=== Japanese colonial period ===
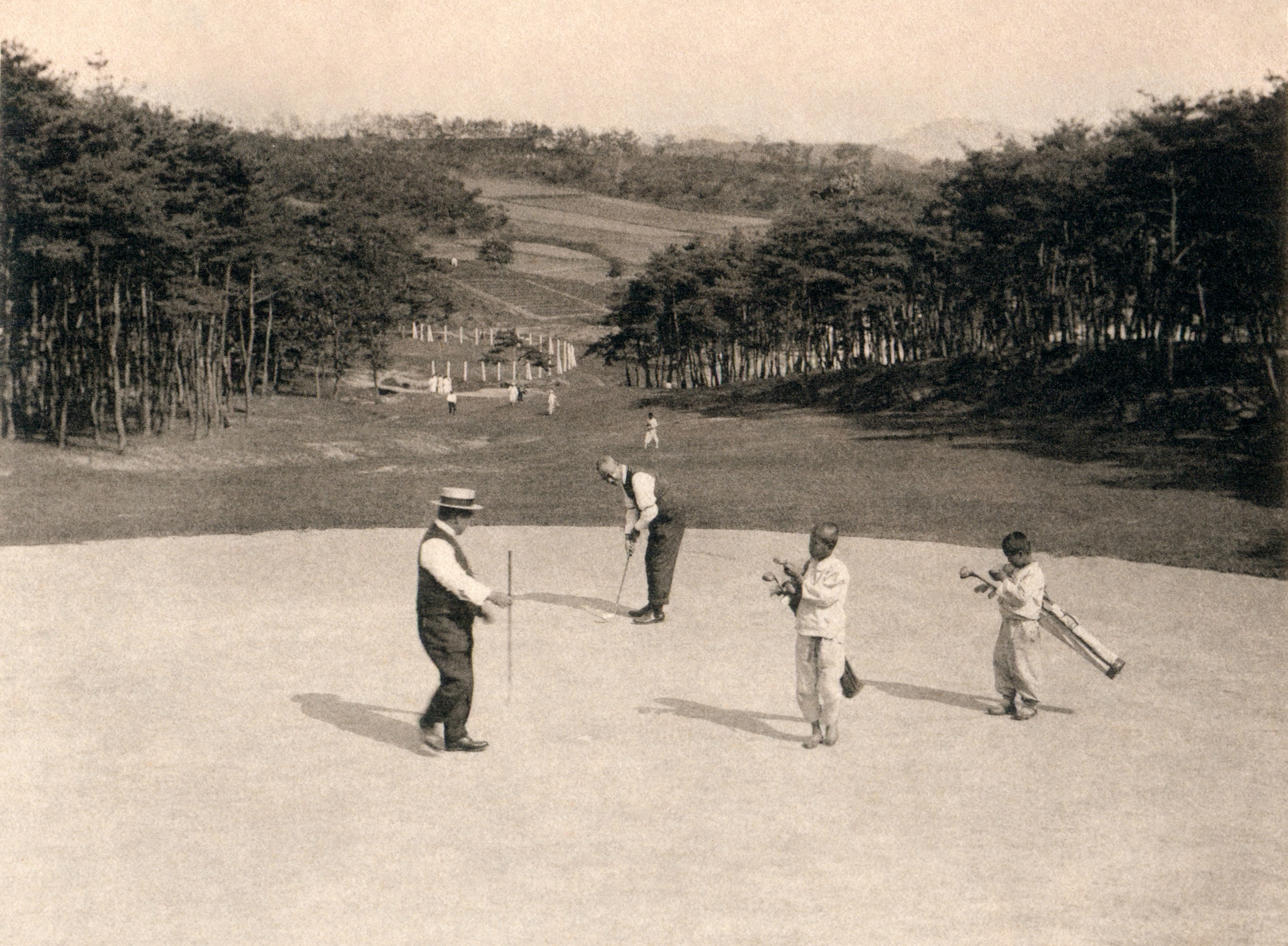
The area, which then still contained tombs of the royal family, was turned into a golf course by the Japanese Empire. A fenced-off tomb can be seen in the center of the picture. (Note: Kim Hai-Gyoung theorized that Munhyo's tomb was located near the second hole and noted that Munhyo's tomb is in an elevated position, but did not comment on which tomb is pictured in this photo.) Two Korean children wearing white can be seen caddying for the players. (Photo published 1925)

During the Japanese colonial period, the name of the area was changed to Kuyongsan'goji (구용산고지; 舊龍山高地). At the time, it was the largest green space in Seoul (then called Keijō). In 1915, the Yongsan police department held a ceremony for their new chief in the area.

On June 1, 1921, the Japanese colonial government established the first golf course in Korea around the graves. Fences were erected around the tombs, which were directly in the line of play. It was a 2,322-yard, nine-hole golf course designed by a British person named H. E. Daunt and operated by the nearby Chōsen Hotel. Author Oh Sang-jun gave this excerpt from Daunt's writings on the course: (Note: Retranslated from Oh's Korean-language translation. "1919년 5월 만주철도주식회사의 초청으로 처음 경성을 방문할 기회를 가졌다. <중략> 송림이 울창하고 잡초가 무성한 효창원 일대를 손댄다는 것은 쉬운 일은 아니었다. 울창하게 자란 큰 나무들을 베어 넘기고 페어웨이를 닦으며 코스 모습을 만드는 것은 결코 쉬운 일이 아니었다. 9홀을 제대로 만들기에는 모자라는 부지인 데다 여기저기 묘까지 산재해 있었다. 묘를 파 없애면 되는 문제이지만 조선인들이 절대로 달갑게 여기지 않을 것이다. 어떻게 하면 훌륭한 코스를 만들 수 있을까에 우리는 심혈을 쏟았다.")

In May 1919, I had the opportunity to visit Keijō for the first time at the invitation of the South Manchuria Railway company... Working with Hyochangwon was no small feat, as it was thick with pine and weeds. It was not easy to cut down the large, thick trees to clear the fairway for the course. The size of the area was insufficient for 9 holes, and there were graves scattered here and there. The problem would be resolved if we were able to dig up the graves, but the Koreans would never stand for that. We put a lot of thought into how to make it a great course.

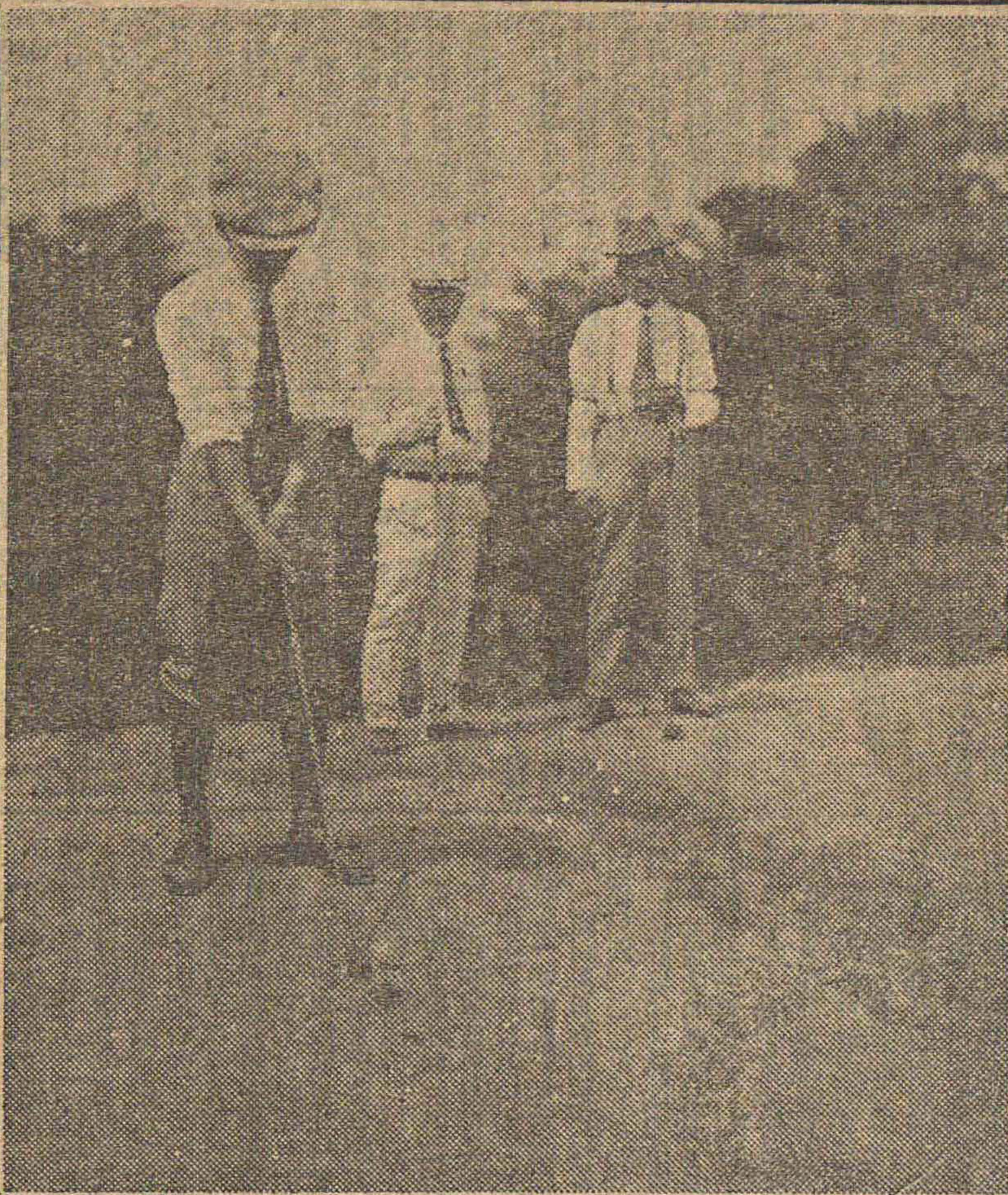
A golf tournament held at the Hyochangwon golf course (Maeil sinbo, June 11, 1923)

The last Crown Prince of Korea Yi Un played at the course, although a significant majority of the players were Japanese or foreign. The golf course was closed in April 1924. This was because the course was difficult to maintain and considered too small. That year the Keijō Golf Club was formed, and it began work on creating new golf courses. The sites of two more royal tombs were again disturbed by golf courses: the Gunjari golf course was first located at Cheongnyangni (around the Uireung Royal Tomb). It began construction in April 1924 and was completed in December. In 1929, that course was moved to Ttukseom. The Yureung Royal Tomb was moved to make way for it.

At the time, efforts were being made to make more green spaces and parks around Keijō. While the area wouldn't formally be made a public park until later, it began to be increasingly turned into one. In 1924, the Japanese colonial government acquired usage rights to the land from the Office of the Yi Dynasty for free over a period of 15 years. In June of that year, the area had a recorded size of 81,460 pyeong (0.2693 km^{2}). In August, a road was paved in the park and the first public toilets were installed, which improved access for the general public. In 1925, a significant flood occurred in the surrounding region that led to the deaths of hundreds of people. In the aftermath of the flood, a temporary relief camp was made in the area. In 1935 and 1936, cherry blossom and Platanus trees were planted. There are various attestations to sporting competitions, tree planting events, and outdoor film screenings in the area in the late 1930s. In 1938, plans were made to convert the area into a children's amusement park that included a zoo, garden, library, and children's museum.

In 1940, the colonial government legally designated Hyochangmyo as a park and named it "Hyochang Park". All of the tombs were moved out of the park in April 1944. After their relocation, the tombs of the royal consort and the crown prince were placed more than 100 paces from each other (2 km), which violated the wishes of King Jeongjo. A memorial to victims of wars of aggression was erected in the park afterwards. In an article for The Hankyoreh, Noh Hyeong-seok described the memorial as hypocritical, given Japan's wars to colonize Korea, and described the tomb transfers as "atrocities". A 2021 paper by Hyun-Chul Youn and Seong-Lyong Ryoo argued that it is not known with certainty whether the Japanese were responsible for moving the graves, as relevant records from this period are lost.

=== Liberation and Korean independence movement memorials ===
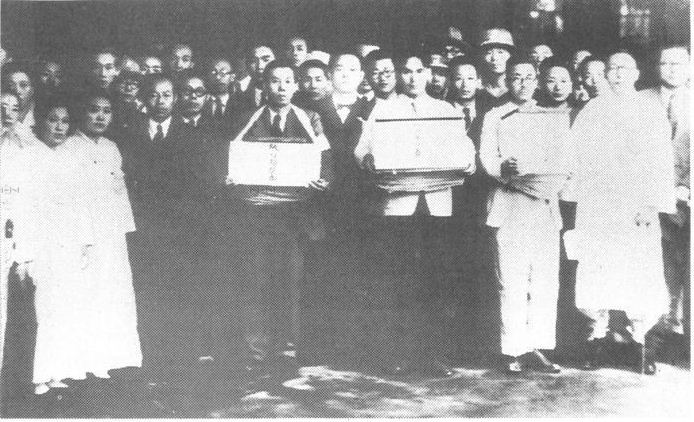
The remains of Lee, Yun, and Baek upon their return to Korea. Photo taken at Seoul Station on May 25, 1946.

Korea gained independence from Japan in 1945 at the end of World War II. Around that time, around 50,000 pyeong (0.17 km^{2}) of the park was empty. Kim Ku, Kim Chang-sook, and other members of the Korean Provisional Government (KPG) had just returned from their exile in China, and were searching for adequate places to bury the remains of independence activists who died in exile. They decided on the park for the location. The KPG paid a total of 70,000 won for the rights to use the land, which were then owned by the former royal family. Hong So-yeon (홍소연), director of the Simsan Kim Chang-sook Memorial Hall, evaluated their motivation: (Note: "일제가 왕실 묘역을 침탈하고 강점했던 곳에 독립운동가들의 유택을 마련한다는 상징성이 컸기 때문에 당연히 이곳을 골랐을 것으로 보인다")

The choice to use the area where Japan forcefully requisitioned and dominated Korean royal tombs as a memorial location for independence activists was highly symbolic. Of course they chose this spot.

On July 9, 1946, a national funeral was held for the reinterment of the remains of Lee Bong-chang, Baek Jeong-gi, and Yun Bong-gil in the park. Their graves are around the former location of Munhyo's grave. On September 22, 1948, the remains of Yi Dong-nyeong and Cha Ri-seok were also buried in the park. Cho Seong-hwan was buried there a few weeks later, on October 14. Their graves are located around the former location of Uibin Seong's grave. Kim Ku was buried in the area on July 5, 1949, after his assassination. Around 500,000 people participated in his funeral procession, making it among the largest in Korean history. His grave is at the highest point of the park.

=== Attempted relocation of graves and change of park identity ===
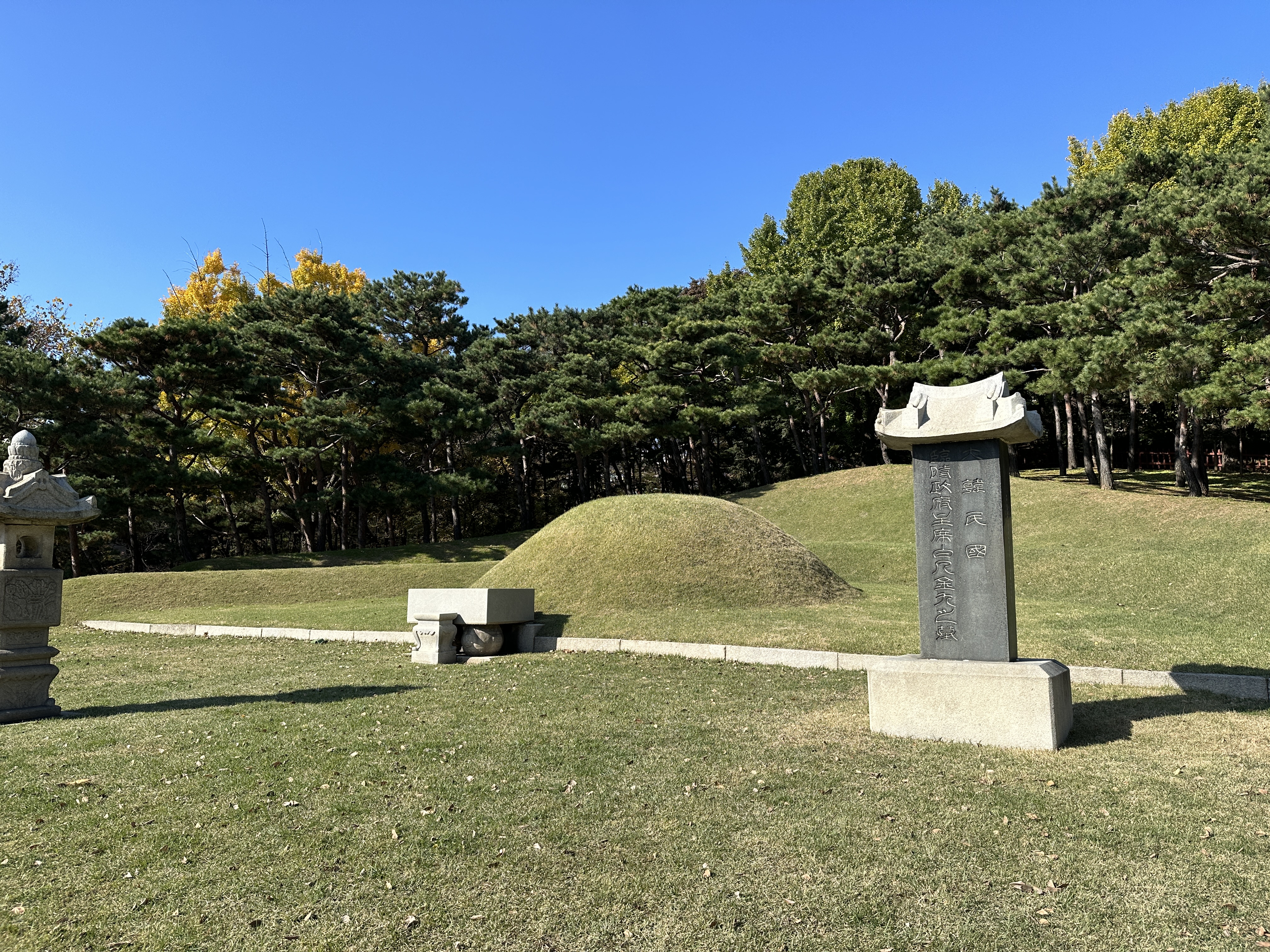
The grave of Kim Ku (2023)

The two Kims originally intended for the park to become a quiet sanctuary to honor the independence movement. According to Kim Ku's secretary Sunwoo Jin, Kim Ku's death stalled progress on further burials in the area. Noh Hyeong-seok of The Hankyoreh speculated that the park might have become a national cemetery if not for Kim Ku's assassination, the Korean War, and the tense relationship between Kim and the first president of South Korea, Syngman Rhee. Rhee had placed police in the park to block mourners in the aftermath of Kim's death.

In May 1956, Rhee and the Seoul city government began an effort to move the graves of the independence activists elsewhere, and construct a stadium and circuit roadway in the area instead. The government provided the pretense of the activists' graves being disrespected by children playing in the area. This was met with pushback from living independence activists and related people. Kim Chang-sook laid down in front of a bulldozer to prevent the removal of the graves. He composed a poem that was then published in The Dong-A Ilbo entitled "Weeping Over Hyochang Park" (효창공원을 통곡함).

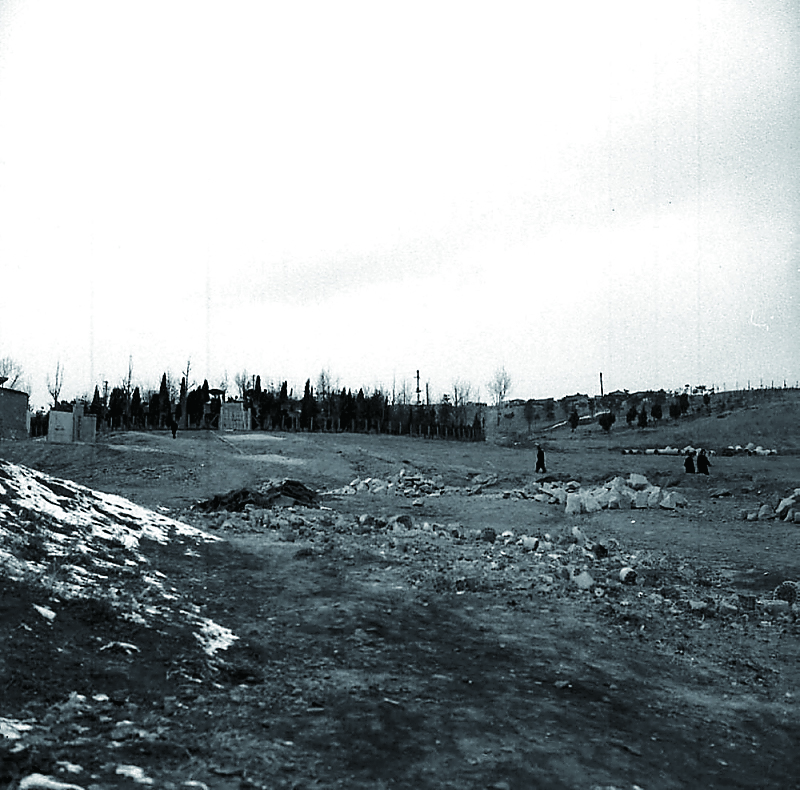
Part of the park in 1968

The relocation was eventually blocked by a unanimous resolution from the National Assembly. The resolution was introduced by Kim Du-han, the son of independence activist Kim Chwa-chin. Despite this, the Rhee administration still pushed to construct what eventually became Hyochang Stadium. After Seoul was selected to host the 1970 Asian Games in June 1959, the estate of Kim Ku allowed for the stadium and roadway to be constructed nearby without the relocation of the graves. By the 1960s, amidst the heavy redevelopment in the area, the park had significantly fewer trees and the graves were not well-connected by paths.

The Park Chung Hee administration took similar steps to move the identity of the park away from that of a cemetery or memorial park for the independence movement. In 1962, that administration attempted to move the graves to the Seooreung Royal Tombs, but this was blocked by citizen protest. In 1966, five tennis courts were built near the tomb of Kim Ku; this number was expanded to 15 by 1983. In 1968, a large wooded area in the park was cut down to make way for a new golf course. The plan was cancelled due to public opposition. The golf course was to be in a valley in the park; on either side of the valley were the graves of independence activists. Sports facilities, food and drink stands, and the community center for the elderly were constructed. A monument for anti-communists who fought against North Korea (북한 반공투사 위령탑) was also constructed in 1969, and still stands today. The Wonhyo statue was installed in 1969 as well. Beginning in 1972, a ten-year renovation effort began on the park; around this time entry into the park was restricted. Around this time, the Park administration installed a statue of Park's wife, Yuk Young-soo, who was killed in 1974.

Beginning with the Chun Doo-hwan administration in the 1980s, the identity of the park was moved back towards that of a cemetery and historical site. The park reopened in June 1982, and began charging entrance fees to visitors. The temple Uiyeolsa and gate Changyeolmun were constructed in November 1988. On June 8, 1989, the park was designated Historic Site of South Korea No. 330.

=== Recent history ===
The Hyochang Park Martyr Memorial Society (효창공원 순국선열추모위원회) was established on March 10, 1978. Beginning in that year, the organization has held an annual memorial ceremony for independence activists on April 13, the anniversary of the establishment of the KPG.

Around that time, the democratization movement in South Korea resulted in a rise in nationalism and renewed interest in the KPG. Political candidates in the 1987 and 1992 elections promised to visit the park if they were elected, but according to Kang Hye-gyeong, did not follow through with their promises. The Kim Young-sam administration (1993–1998) oversaw a renewed interest in the legacy of the KPG and the independence movement. They reportedly considered moving the grave of Kim Ku to Seoul National Cemetery, but plans fell through due to opposition from the public and restrictions on plot sizes in that cemetery.

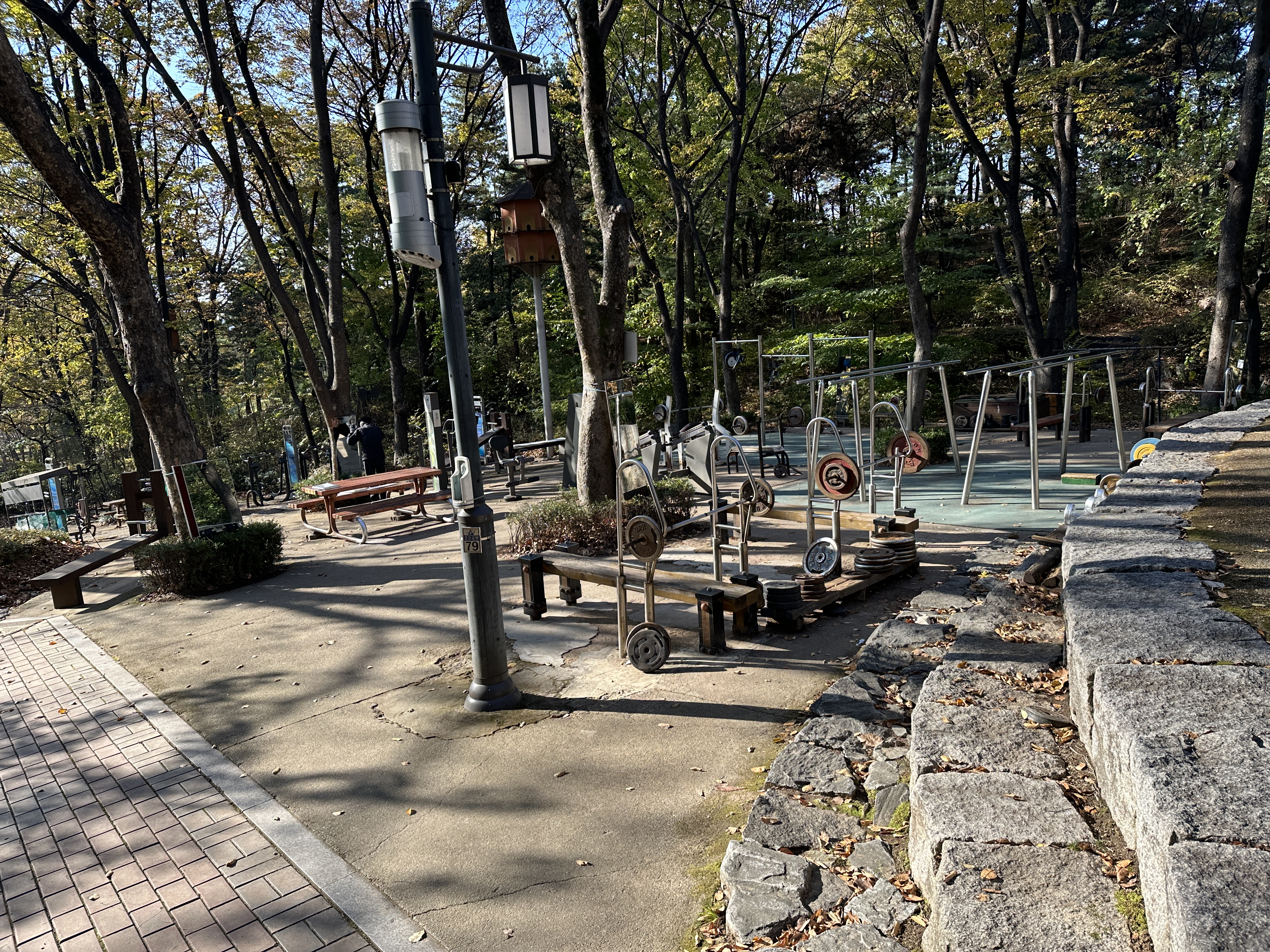
Exercise equipment in the park (2023)

On October 22, 2002, the Kim Koo Museum was constructed in place of the tennis courts during the Kim Dae-jung administration (1998–2003). The Roh Moo-hyun administration (2003–2008) continued sanctification efforts, ordering the Ministry of Patriots and Veterans Affairs to "fully restore the historical significance" of the park in March 2005. The ministry, in turn, announced a 30 billion won plan to demolish the stadium and use the land to construct a square and cultural facility in 2005 March. However, after receiving pushback from the Seoul Metropolitan Government and a soccer association, the architectural plan released a year later instead proposed to renovate the stadium to fit international standards and build auxiliary facilities. In addition, the proposal did not include a plan for removal of the anti-communist monument. In response, independence groups such as Liberation Association called for the plan to be scrapped. The Lee Myung-bak administration terminated the scheme by April 2009.

In 2007 and 2013, two proposals were put forward in the National Assembly to turn Hyochang Park into a national cemetery, but both failed to receive adequate support. For the 2013 proposal, local residents expressed a variety of concerns. They were worried about potential negative impact on local real estate prices and access to the park; other national cemeteries at the time were only open from 6am to 6pm.

According to Noh Hyeong-seok, the park's identity (and even public awareness of the graves in the park) has continued to be uncertain. The majority of people currently seem to view the park as a space for leisure. In 2018, The Hankyoreh interviewed the leader of an organization called "People Who Love Hyochangwon" (효창원을 사랑하는 사람들) that advocates for its greater emphasis as a memorial.

On February 9, 2015, President Moon Jae-in advocated for heightening the park's memorial identity. On August 15, 2017, Moon participated in a memorial ceremony dedicated to the KPG at the park. In 2018, it was reported that the Ministry of Patriots and Veterans Affairs was considering a plan to demolish the stadium. In 2019, the park was set to be reorganized and renewed as part of the 100th anniversary celebration of the establishment of the KPG. As part of the plan, they controversially sought to move Uiyeolsa to a different location in the park. As the park is a protected historical site, they conducted written interviews with experts in history, architecture, and feng shui between October and December 2020. A majority of the experts rejected the move. The overall plan is set to be finished by 2024.
