= Princess Ch'ŏngsŏn =

Princess Ch'ŏngsŏn 청선공주
- Princess of Joseon
- Born: 1756; Hanseong, Kingdom of Joseon
- Died: 20 July 1802 (aged 45–46); Hanseong, Kingdom of Joseon
- Burial: Gwangju, Gyeonggi Province
- Spouse: Chŏng Chaehwa, Prince Consort Heungeun (m.1766)
- Issue: 3
- House: Jeonju Yi (by birth); Yeonil Chŏng (by marriage)
- Father: Crown Prince Sado
- Mother: Lady Hyegyeong

Princess Ch'ŏngsŏn (Korean: 청선공주; 1756 – 20 July 1802) was a royal princess during Joseon dynasty. She was the second daughter of Crown Prince Sado and Lady Hyegyŏng, the younger sister of the future king Yi San.

== Life ==
Princess Ch'ŏngsŏn was born in the ruling Yi clan of Jeonju. She was the second daughter and fourth child of Crown Prince Sado and Crown Princess Hong.

In 1766, when the princess was just 10 years old, she married Chŏng Chaehwa of the Yeonil Jeong clan. The princess would give birth to three children during the marriage, one son and two daughters. All of them survived to adulthood

In 1773, along her older sister Princess Cheongyeon and her brother's future beloved consort, Royal Noble Consort Uibin Seong, transcribed the classic novel Kwakchangyangmullok (곽장양문록; 郭張兩門錄) to Korean.

== Family ==
=== Parents ===
- Father: Crown Prince Sado (사도세자; 13 February 1735 – 12 July 1762)
  - Grandfather: Yeongjo of Joseon (조선 영조; 31 October 1694 – 22 April 1776)
  - Grandmother: Royal Noble Consort Yeong of the Jeonui Yi clan (영빈 전의 이씨; 15 August 1696 — 23 August 1764)
  - Adoptive grandmother: Queen Jeongseong of the Daegu Seo clan (정성왕후 서씨; 12 January 1693 – 3 April 1757)
- Mother: Lady Hyegyŏng (6 August 1735 – 13 January 1816)
  - Grandfather: Hong Ponghan (홍봉한; 1713–1778)
  - Grandmother: Internal Princess Consort Hansan of the Hansan Yi clan (한산부부인 한산 이씨; 1713–1755)

=== Siblings ===
- Older Brother: Crown Prince Uiso (27 September 1750 – 17 April 1752)
- Older Brother: Jeongjo of Joseon (28 October 1752 – 18 August 1800)
- Older Half-brother: Prince Euneon (1 February 1754 – 30 June 1801)
- Older Half-brother: Prince Eunsin (1755–1771)
- Younger Sister: Princess Ch'ŏngyŏn (1756 – 20 July 1802)
- Younger Half Sister: Princess Ch'ŏnggŭn (청근옹주; 1758–1835)
- Younger Half-brother: Prince Euneon (14 August 1759 – 26 August 1778)

=== Spouse ===
- Husband: Chŏng Chaehwa, Prince Consort Heungeun of Yeonil Jeong clan (흥은위 정재화연일 정씨, 1754 –1790)
  - Father-in-law: Chŏng Inhwan (정인환)
  - Mother-in-law: Lady Kwŏn, of the Andong Gwon clan (안동 김씨)

=== Issue ===
- Son: Chŏng Ŭi (정의, 1782–1832)
- Daughter: Lady Chŏng, of the Yeonil Jeong clan (연일 정씨)
  - Son-in-law: Min Chi-Seong (민치성)
- Daughter: Lady Chŏng, of the Yeonil Jeong clan (연일 정씨)
  - Son-in-law: Hong Hyŏk (홍혁)

== In popular culture ==
- Portrayed by Jo Seung Hee in MBC TV series The Red Sleeve (2021)
