= Uibin Seong =

Joseon royal consort (1753–1786)

- Royal Consort of the Senior First Rank
- Born: 6 August 1753; Joseon
- Died: 4 November 1786 (aged 33); Junghuidang Hall, Changdeokgung, Hanseong, Joseon
- Burial: Uibinmyo, Seosamneung Cluster, Goyang, South Korea
- Consort of: King Jeongjo
- Issue Detail: 1 son, 1 daughter
Names
- Seong Deok-im (성덕임; 成德任)
- Clan: Changnyeong Seong (by birth); Jeonju Yi (by marriage)
- Dynasty: Yi
- Father: Seong Yun-u
- Mother: Lady, of the Buan Im clan

Korean name
- Hangul: 의빈 성씨
- Hanja: 宜嬪成氏
- RR: Uibin Seongssi
- MR: Ŭibin Sŏngssi

Uibin Seong (Korean: 의빈 성씨; Hanja: 宜嬪 成氏; 6 August 1753 – 4 November 1786) or Concubine Ui, (Note: The literal translation of bin (빈; 嬪) is "concubine". Combined with the honorific title ui (의; 宜), the full meaning is "Proper Concubine".) of the Changnyeong Seong clan, personal name Seong Deok-im, was the beloved consort of King Jeongjo, the 22nd monarch of Joseon, and the biological mother of Crown Prince Munhyo.

== Biography ==
=== Early life ===
Lady Seong was born during Yeongjo's reign, into the Changnyeong Seong clan. She was the youngest child of Seong Yun-u and his second wife, a lady from the Buan Im clan. Lady Seong had seven siblings: four older brothers, two older sister, and one younger half-brother.

Seong Yun-u's first wife was from the Jangheung Ma clan. After her death, he married Lady Im, the daughter of Im Jong-ju, a minor government official. She died in 1756, three years after giving birth to Lady Seong. Seong Yun-u's third wife came from the Danyang Ji clan.

Their family was quite poor, and at the time of Lady Seong's birth, her father worked as a steward for Hong Bong-han, the maternal grandfather of King Jeongjo. He later became a military officer, but resigned in 1761, due to embezzlement accusations, and died in 1769.

=== Life in the palace ===
In 1762, at the age of 9, she became a palace lady. Thanks to her father's relationship with the Pungsan Hong clan, Lady Seong was chosen as a personal maid of King Jeongjo's mother, Lady Hyegyŏng.

In 1773, she transcribed to Korean the classic novel Gwakjangyangmunrok (comprising 10 volumes), alongside Princess Cheongyeon and Princess Cheongseon.

Some time before 1782, she received Jeongjo's favor and was promoted to sangui (상의; 尙儀), a female official of the senior fifth rank. It is recorded that she was pregnant two times between 1780 and 1782, but both pregnancies ended in miscarriage.

On 13 October 1782, Lady Seong gave birth to her first child, Yi Yang. That same day, she was appointed as a royal consort of the senior third rank (소용; 昭容; soyong). Almost three months later, in late December 1782, her son was given the title of prince royal (원자; 元子; wonja).

The following year, Lady Seong was promoted to the senior first rank (빈; 嬪; bin), and Jeongjo personally chose for her the honorific title ui (의; 宜), meaning "proper".

In the first half of 1784, Lady Seong gave birth to a daughter who died in infancy.

On 17 August 1784, Yi Yang was invested as crown prince, but he died during an epidemic on 6 June 1786.

=== Death ===
Four months after the death of her son, Lady Seong passed away during the last month of her fifth pregnancy. The unborn child died with her. King Jeongjo wrote her a eulogy, in which he described his grief and declared his love for her. It was said that Lady Seong was the only woman he loved amongst his consorts.

She was initially buried about 100 steps from her son, Crown Prince Munhyo. King Jeongjo planted 26.000 trees within the grounds, known today as Hyochang Park and situated in Yongsan District, Seoul.

In 1944, during the Japanese occupation, both tombs were relocated to the Seosamneung Cluster in Goyang, Gyeonggi Province. Crown Prince Munhyo was buried next to his uncle, Crown Prince Uiso, while Lady Seong was buried 2 km away, in the royal consorts' cemetery. Her tomb is called Uibinmyo (의빈묘; 宜嬪墓).

Lady Seong's spirit tablet was enshrined in Uibingung (의빈궁; 宜嬪宮), at Chilgung (칠궁; 七宮), the place which now houses the spirit tablets of seven royal consorts who gave birth to kings. In 1908, during Sunjong's reign, Uibingung was closed. However, the name was preserved and the annual rituals continued to be held.

== Family ==
Parents

- Father: Seong Yun-u (성윤우; 成胤祐; 1709–1769)
  - Grandfather: Seong Su-san (성수산; 成壽山; 1668–1749)
  - Grandmother: Honorable Madame, of the Gimhae Kim clan (정부인 김해 김씨; 貞夫人 金海 金氏; 1674–1698), Seong Su-san's first wife
  - Biological grandmother: Honorable Madame, of the Changwon Hwang clan (정부인 창원 황씨; 貞夫人 昌原 黄氏; 1677–1747)
- Mother: Lady, of the Jangheung Ma clan (장흥 마씨; 長興 馬氏; 1715–?); Seong Yun-u's first wife
- Biological mother: Honorable and Respectful Madame, of the Buan Im clan (정경부인 부안 임씨; 貞敬夫人 扶安 林氏; 1722–1756)
  - Grandfather: Im Jong-ju (임종주; 林宗胄)
- Stepmother: Lady, of the Danyang Ji clan (단양 지씨; 丹陽 池氏); Seong Yun-u's third wife

Sibling(s)

- Elder sister: Lady, of the Changnyeong Seong clan (창녕 성씨; 昌寧 成氏)
- Brother-in-law: Kang Deok-sun (강덕순; 康德淳)
  - Nephew: Kang Ui-sin (강의신; 康義信; 1755–?)
- Elder brother: Seong Dam (성담; 成湛; 1741–1783)
- Sister-in-law: Lady, of the Seongju Yi clan (성주 이씨; 星州 李氏; 1739–1770)
- Sister-in-law: Lady, of the Jeonju Yi clan (전주 이씨; 全州 李氏; 1751–1799)
  - Nephew: Seong Guk-min (성국민; 成國民; 1766–1809)
  - Niece-in-law: Lady, of the Gangneung Yu clan (강릉 유씨; 江陵 劉氏; 1768–1809)
  - Nephew: Seong Hui-min (성희민; 成羲民; 1780–1809)
  - Niece-in-law: Lady, of the Jeonju Yi clan (전주 이씨; 全州 李氏)
- Elder brother: Seong Hyeob (성협; 成浹; 1742–1810)
- Sister-in-law: Lady, of the Gangneung Choe clan (강릉 최씨; 江陵 崔氏)
- Sister-in-law: Lady, of the Danyang Mun clan (단양 문씨; 丹陽 文氏)
  - Nephew: Seong Do-min (성도민; 成道民)
  - Niece-in-law: Lady, of the Miryang Park clan (밀양 박씨; 密陽 朴氏)
  - Nephew: Seong Ho-min (성호민; 成皥民)
  - Niece-in-law: Lady, of the Cheongju Han clan (청주 한씨; 淸州 韓氏)
- Elder brother: Seong Wan (성완; 成浣; 1743–1806)
- Sister-in-law: Lady, of the Cheongju Han clan (청주 한씨; 淸州 韓氏; 1742–1794)
  - Nephew: Seong Sun-min (성순민; 成舜民; 1763–1849)
  - Niece-in-law: Lady, of the Danyang Woo clan (단양 우씨; 丹陽 禹氏)
  - Nephew: Seong Deok-min (성덕민; 成德民; 1782–1828)
  - Niece-in-law: Lady, of the Uiryeong Nam clan (의령 남씨; 宜寧 南氏; 1780–1812)
  - Niece: Lady, of the Changnyeong Seong clan (창녕 성씨; 昌寧 成氏)
  - Nephew-in-law: Jo Sang-ju (조상주; 趙尙周)
- Elder brother: Seong Suk (성숙; 成淑)
  - Nephew: Seong Yeo-min (성여민; 成與民)
- Elder sister: Lady, of the Changnyeong Seong clan (창녕 성씨; 昌寧 成氏)
- Brother-in-law: Yun Gwang-eun (윤광은; 尹光殷; ?–1807)
  - Nephew: Yun Dong-cheol (윤동철; 尹東喆)
- Younger brother: Seong Heub (성흡; 成洽; 1762–?)
- Sister-in-law: Lady, of the Geumcheon Na clan (금천 나씨; 錦川 羅氏)
  - Nephew: Seong Jun-min (성준민; 成俊民)

Husband

- Jeongjo of Joseon (조선 정조; 朝鮮 正祖; 28 October 1752 – 18 August 1800)

Issue

- Miscarriage (1780)
- Miscarriage (1781)
- Yi Yang, Crown Prince Munhyo (문효세자 이양; 文孝世子 李㬀; 13 October 1782 – 6 June 1786), Jeongjo's first son
- Unnamed daughter (1784), Jeongjo's first daughter
- Unborn child (1786) (Note: Died in utero as a result of the mother's death during the last month of pregnancy.)

== In popular culture ==
- Portrayed by Jung Eun-suk in the 1989 MBC TV series 500 Years of the Joseon Dynasty: Pa Mun.
- Portrayed by Lee Han-na and Han Ji-min in the 2007 MBC TV series Lee San, Wind of the Palace.
- Portrayed by Lee Seol-ah and Lee Se-young in the 2021 MBC TV series The Red Sleeve.
