= Hyochang-dong =

Coordinates: 37°32′25″N 126°57′37″E

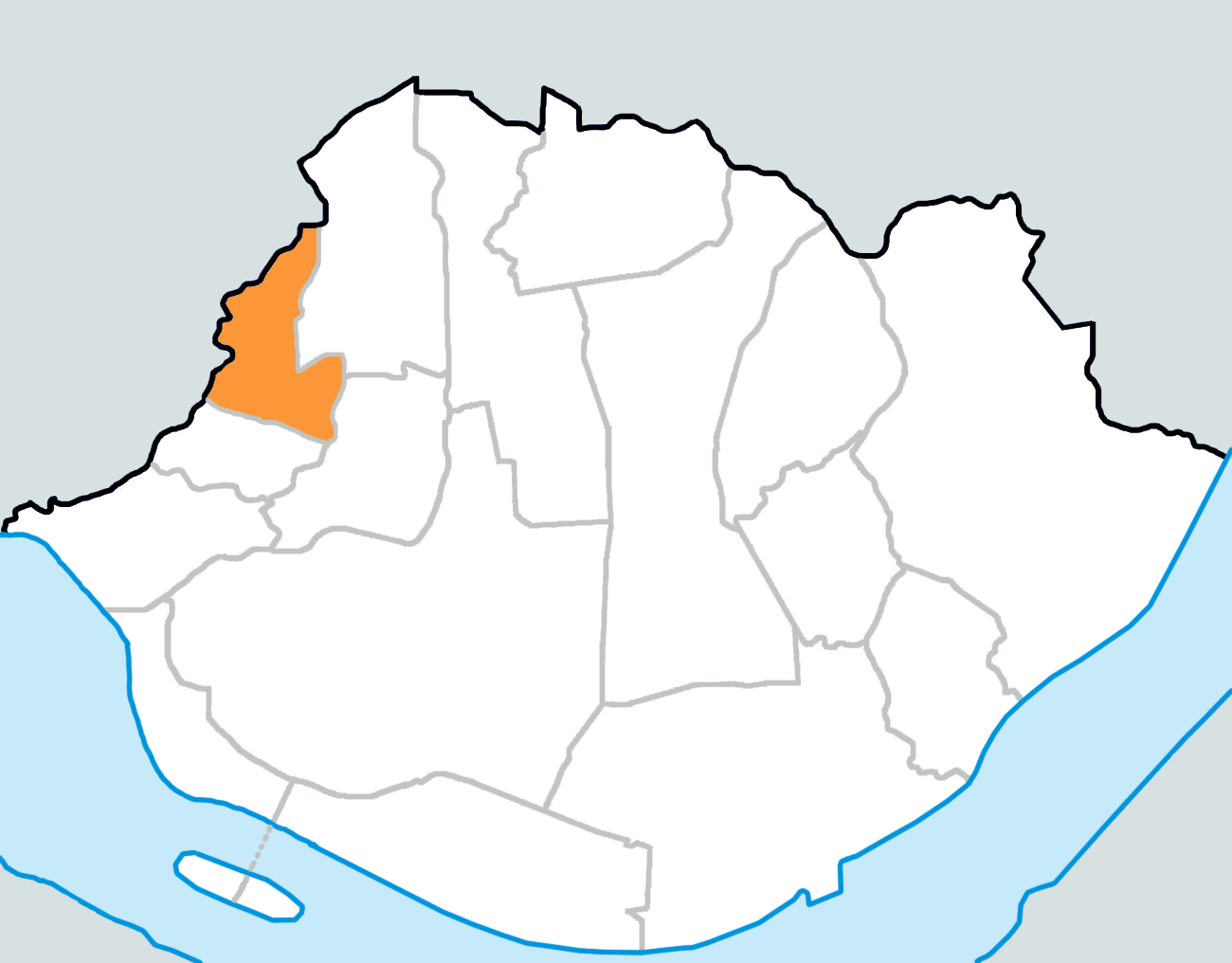
- Country: South Korea

Area
  - Total: 0.44 km^{2} (0.17 sq mi)

Population (2013)
  - Total: 11,219
  - Density: 25,336/km^{2} (65,620/sq mi)

Korean name
- Hangul: 효창동
- Hanja: 孝昌洞
- RR: Hyochang-dong
- MR: Hyoch'ang-dong

Hyochang-dong (Korean: 효창동) is a ward of Yongsan District, Seoul, South Korea.

== History ==
Hyochang-dong was named after a place called "Hyochangwon"(located in modern day Hyochang Park). Hyochangwon was the royal tomb of Crown Prince Munhyo, who was the first born of king Jeongjo of Joseon, which was originally located in Gyeonggido, Goyang county, Yulmokdong, which later changed to be part of modern day Hyochangdong Yongsan district. The tombs later moved to Goyang, where the tombs of Seosamreung is located in. The town was also called hamabigye because it had a stele called the hamabi that requires anyone visiting to step down from a horse.

== Attraction ==
- Kim Koo Museum
- Hyochang Stadium
- Hyochang Park

== Education ==
- Seoul Keumyang Elementary School
- Automotive High School in Seoul

== Transportation ==
- Hyochang Park Station of
