= Crown Prince Munhyo =

Crown Prince of Joseon (1782–1786)

- Crown Prince of Korea (posthumously)

Crown Prince of Joseon
- Tenure: 17 August 1784 – 6 June 1786
- Investiture: Seonjeongjeon, Changdeokgung
- Predecessor: Crown Prince Seon
- Successor: Crown Prince Hong
- Born: 13 October 1782; Yeonhwadang, Changdeokgung, Hanseong, Joseon
- Died: 6 June 1786 (aged 3); Jagyeongjeon, Changgyeonggung, Hanseong, Joseon
- Burial: Hyochangwon, Seosamneung Cluster, Goyang, South Korea
Names
- Yi Yang (이양; 李㬀)
Posthumous name
- Crown Prince Munhyo (문효세자; 文孝世子 → 문효태자; 文孝太子) (Note: Elevated to "Supreme Son" (태자; 太子; Taeja) following the establishment of the Korean Empire.)
- Clan: Jeonju Yi
- Dynasty: Yi
- Father: King Jeongjo
- Mother: Concubine Ui (biological); Queen Hyoui (adoptive)
- Religion: Confucianism (Neo-Confucianism)

Korean name
- Hangul: 문효세자
- Hanja: 文孝世子
- RR: Munhyo seja
- MR: Munhyo seja

Crown Prince Munhyo (Korean: 문효세자; Hanja: 文孝世子; 13 October 1782 – 6 June 1786), personal name Yi Yang, was the elder son of King Jeongjo, the 22nd monarch of Joseon, and the half-brother of King Sunjo. His biological mother was Concubine Ui, the most beloved consort of his father.

== Biography ==
=== Life ===
In the morning of 13 October, Yi Yang was born to King Jeongjo and his consort, Concubine Ui. He was the first child of the king, who was overjoyed by the birth.

(In Korean): "비로소 아비라는 소리를 듣게 되었으니, 이것이 다행스럽다."

(Translation): "It is fortunate that I have finally come to be called father."

— The Veritable Records of King Jeongjo

Jeongjo had been childless for 20 years despite being married to Queen Hyoui, and later taking concubines. He then named Yi Yang the prince royal (원자; 元子; wonja). Ten months later, Yi Yang was appointed as crown prince.

However, the young crown prince succumbed to smallpox at the age of 3. His death was a profound shock to Jeongjo, who mourned deeply. It also had a significant impact on the history of Joseon, becoming the backdrop for the power struggle between the former supporters of Yi Yang and those of his younger half-brother, Yi Hong.

Three days after his death, the posthumous name of the late crown prince was discussed in the royal court and Onhyo (온효; 温孝) was chosen.

(In Korean): "꿈인가, 참인가, 꿈이라 하여 반드시 꿈도 아닐 것이고 참이라 하여 반드시 참도 아닐 것이다."

(Translation): "Is it a dream, or is it reality? It is not necessarily a dream just because it is called a dream, and it is not necessarily reality just because it is called reality."

— King Jeongjo

The following week, the posthumous name was changed to Munhyo (문효; 文孝). The eulogy was written by Pak Chiwŏn, and the epitaph, by Kim Jong-su. A poem titled "Munhyo Seja Manjang" is included in Joengjeop, the collection of poems and essays authored by the Joseon scholar Yi Seong-won. This collection is currently in the archives of Yonsei University.

=== Tomb ===
Crown Prince Munhyo's tomb was first known as Hyochangmyo (효창원; 孝昌墓), then was later elevated to Hyochangwon (효창원; 孝昌園). It was initially situated in present-day Yongsan District, Seoul, 100 steps away from the tomb of his biological mother. However, it was relocated to the Seosamneung Cluster in Goyang, Gyeonggi Province, during the Japanese occupation. The former site of the two tombs is now occupied by Hyochang Park.

=== Taesil ===
In Korean culture, the placenta and umbilical cord of a royal child was considered a sacred object, believed to contain the essence of the child's life. It was often enshrined in a special place called taesil (태실). In 1783, the taesil of Crown Prince Munhyo was established at Yongmunsa Temple in Yecheon, North Gyeongsang Province.

During the Japanese occupation, the Office of the Royal Household removed the contents of the taesil, leaving only the tombstone. The taesil was restored in 1977 after some destruction.

== Legacy ==
After the 18th century, there was a growing trend toward producing paintings that realistically depicted scenes of the crown prince's investiture or the Eastern Palace rites associated with the crown prince's education. Works such as "Crown Prince Munhyo Etiquette Record", portraying the imvestiture of Crown Prince Munhyo, and "Wangseja Iphak Docheop", portraying the admission ceremony at Sungkyunkwan of Crown Prince Hyomyeong, serve as representative examples. Those two paintings are important historical documents that provide insights into the life and culture of the Joseon court.

In 1782, upon the appointment of Yi Yang as crown prince, the Qing imperial court sent a jade Buddha from Burma to wish for his longevity. This precious gift from a powerful neighbor symbolized Qing's support for Joseon. In response, King Jeongjo reconstructed Sungkyansa Temple to house the jade Buddha. However, its current whereabouts remain unknown.

King Jeongjo visited Crown Prince Munhyo's tomb several times, and this is why the name of the hill in Yongsan District is called Geodunggogae (거둥고개; lit. ''the hill where the king traveled'').

Hongyebun (홍예분) was a village in Singongdeok-dong, Mapo District, Seoul. It was located on the way to Crown Prince Munhyo's tomb. The village was named after the appearance of the burial mound from a distance. The mound was shaped like a rainbow, and it was said to be a sign of the crown prince's good fortune.

== Family ==
- Father: King Jeongjo (정조대왕; 28 October 1752 – 18 August 1800)
  - Biological grandfather: King Jangjo (장조대왕; 13 February 1735 – 12 July 1762)
  - Legal grandfather: King Jinjong (진종대왕; 4 April 1719 – 16 December 1728)
  - Biological grandmother: Queen Heongyeong (헌경왕후), of the Pungsan Hong clan (풍산 홍씨; 6 August 1735 – 13 January 1816)
  - Legal grandmother: Queen Hyosun (효순왕후), of the Pungyang Jo clan (풍양 조씨; 8 January 1716 – 30 December 1751)
- Biological mother: Concubine Ui (의빈), of the Changnyeong Seong clan (창녕 성씨; 6 August 1753 – 4 November 1786)
  - Grandfather: Seong Yun-u (성윤우; 1709–1769)
  - Grandmother: Lady, of the Buan Im clan (부인 임씨; 1722–1756)
- Adoptive mother: Queen Hyoui (효의왕후), of the Cheongpung Kim clan (청풍 김씨; 25 December 1753 – 29 March 1821)

== Ancestry ==
Ancestors of Crown Prince Munhyo

King Sukjong (숙종대왕)
King Yeongjo (영조대왕)
Concubine Suk, of the Haeju Choe clan (숙빈 해주 최씨)
King Jangjo (장조대왕)
Yi Yu-beon (이유번)
Concubine Yeong, of the Jeonui Yi clan (영빈 전의 이씨)
Lady, of the Hanyang Kim clan (한양 김씨)
King Jeongjo (정조대왕)
Hong Hyeon-bo (홍현보)
Hong Bong-han, Internal Prince Yeongpung (영풍부원군 홍봉한)
Lady, of the Pungcheon Im clan (풍천 임씨)
Queen Heongyeong, of the Pungsan Hong clan (헌경왕후 풍산 홍씨)
Yi Jib (이집)
Internal Princess Consort Hansan, of the Hansan Yi clan (한산부부인 한산 이씨)
Lady, of the Gigye Yu clan (기계 유씨)
Crown Prince Munhyo
Seong Geun-rip (성근립)
Seong Su-san (성수산)
Lady, of the Chungju Yu clan (충주 유씨)
Seong Yun-u (성윤우)
Hwang Sang (황상)
Lady, of the Changwon Hwang clan (창원 황씨)
Concubine Ui, of the Changnyeong Seong clan (의빈 창녕 성씨)
Im Jong-ju (임종주)
Lady, of the Buan Im clan (부인 임씨)

== In popular culture ==
- Portrayed by Cha Jae-dol in the 2007 MBC TV series Lee San, Wind of the Palace.
- Portrayed by Park Da-on in the 2021 MBC TV series The Red Sleeve.

== See also ==
- History of Korea
- List of monarchs of Korea
- Styles and titles in Joseon
