= Prince Yeollyeong =

Korean prince

Prince Yeollyeong (Korean: 연령군; Hanja: 延齡君; June 13, 1699 – October 2, 1719) was the sixth son of King Sukjong of Joseon. His personal name was Yi Hwon (이훤; 李昍) while his childhood name was Insu (인수; 仁壽), and his courtesy name was Munsuk (문숙; 文叔).

== Biography ==
Prince Yeollyeong's parents were King Sukjong and one of his consorts, Royal Noble Consort Myeong of the Miryang Park clan (Korean: 명빈 박씨; Hanja: 䄙嬪 朴氏); when Yi Hwon was five (East Asian age reckoning), Lady Park died and he acquired the official title in the same year. In 1707, Lady Kim, daughter of an official Kim Dong-pil (Korean: 김동필; Hanja: 金東弼), was chosen to be the spouse of Prince Yeollyeong and they married in the same year. The couple had no issue. Prince Yeollyeong died in 1719 and his posthumous name was "Hyohyeon" (Korean: 효헌; Hanja: 孝憲).

== Family ==
=== Wife ===
- Princess Consort Sangsan of the Sangju Kim clan (상산군부인 상주 김씨, 26 June 1698 – 12 June 1725): Her maternal grandfather was Yi Pyo, Prince Imwon (임원군 이표, 1654–1724), a great-great-grandson of King Seonjo of Joseon.

=== Issue ===
Prince Yeollyeong died without issue; as such, Yi Sang-dae, the second son of Prince Milpung (Prince Yeollyeong's third cousin) was chosen to be his heir in 1719 and given a new name Yi Gong (Korean: 이공; Hanja: 李糼) in 1727.

- Adopted son (annulled): Yi Gong, Prince Sangwon (상원군 이공, 1715–1733), a great-great-grandson of Crown Prince Sohyeon. He had no issue; as Prince Milpung was involved in the Musin Revolt, the adoption relationship was posthumously annulled in 1733.
- Adopted son (annulled): Yi On, Prince Nakcheon (1720–1737), a 4-great-grandson of Prince Gyeongchang (9th son of King Seonjo) and the only son of Yi Chae (이채); appointed to be the heir to Prince Yeollyeong in 1734. He had no issue; the adoption relationship was posthumously annulled during the reign of King Jeongjo.
  - Adopted grandson (annulled): Yi Yeong, Prince Dalseon (1731–1749), a 6-great-grandson of Deokheung Daewongun (7th son of King Jungjong) and the second son of Yi Hyeong-jong. He committed suicide after being abused by his adoptive mother, Lady Seo, the wife of Prince Nakcheon; therefore, the adoption relationship was posthumously annulled in 1750. He married Lady Sin (1730–1786) of the Geochang Sin clan but they had no issue; his nephew Yi Min-sik (이민식, 1753–1817; grandson of Yi Hyeong-jong) was appointed to be his heir.
- Heir: Prince Eunsin (1755–1771), grandnephew of Prince Yeollyeong and the fourth son of Crown Prince Sado. He was posthumously made the successor of Prince Yeollyeong in 1776, but not as his "adopted grandson" or "adopted son" of Prince Nakcheon.
