= Prince Nakcheon =

Prince Nakcheon (Korean: 낙천군; Hanja: 洛川君; November 26, 1720 – September 28, 1737) was a royal family member of the Joseon dynasty. His name was Yi On (이온; 李縕) while he was originally named Yi Susin (이수신; 李守愼); his courtesy name was "Onjung" (온중; 蘊仲).

Prince Nakcheon was by birth the only son of Yi Chae (이채; 李埰), and he later became an adoptive son of late Prince Yeollyeong in 1734.

== Biography ==
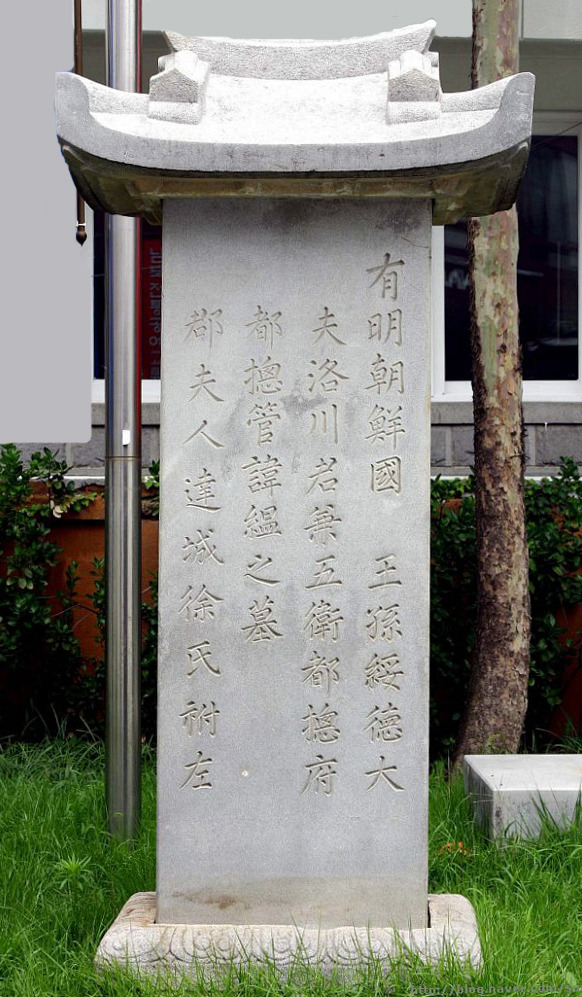
The gravestone of Prince Nackcheon

Prince Nakcheon was born as the only son of Yi Chae and Lady Yu of the Jinju Yu clan (daughter of Yu Man-jung). Through Yi Chae, he was a 4-great-grandson of Prince Gyeongchang (9th son of King Seonjo).

Prior to the adoption, Prince Yeollyeong, the youngest son of King Sukjong, died without issue in 1719; therefore, a descendant of Crown Prince Sohyeon became Prince Yeollyeong's heir in the same year, and was later known as Yi Gong, Prince Sangwon (상원군 이공; 商原君李糼; 1715–1733) as of 1727. However, Prince Sangwon's birth family got involved in the Musin Revolt in 1728; as a relative to a "criminal", Sangwon himself died unmarried in 1733 and he had no issue, the adoption relationship was soon annulled in the same year as well. And so, King Yeongjo asked the officials to seek another heir for his late brother.

Later, among some of the king's closest relatives, Yeongjo was impressed by Yi Soosin, the son of Yi Chae; it was soon decided that Yi Soosin was to be the heir to Prince Yeollyeong and, as he was aged enough, he was eligible to receive the royal title, in 1734. In the same year, Yi Soosin's name was changed to "Yi Ohn" and received the title, Prince Nakcheon.

Around 1735 to 1737, Yeongjo decided to find a bride for his nephew, and daughters from some of the officials, including Kim Chi-man (김치만; 金致萬) and Seo Jong-su (서종수; 徐宗秀; 1678–1744) from noble families, were chosen, but they both refused to have their daughter marry the prince; both of them were imprisoned by the order of Yeongjo and Lady Seo married Prince Nakcheon in 1737. Lady Seo was a great-great-granddaughter of Princess Jeongsin, the eldest daughter of King Seonjo; the couple had no children. After he married, Prince Nakcheon died suddenly in the same year, aged 16.

After his death, Prince Nakcheon was buried in the family graveyard at Geumcheon of Gyeonggi Province (now Siheung County, Gyeonggi Province), near to his adoptive parents and grandmother's burial.

== Heir ==
On October 7, 1747, King Yeongjo ordered Yi Cheol-hai (이철해; 李喆楷), a 7-great-grandson of Deokheung Daewongun (7th son of King Jungjong and the father of Seonjo) and the second son of Yi Hyeong-jong (이형종; 李亨宗), to be the heir to Prince Nakcheon under a new name and title, Yi Yeong, Prince Dalseon (달선군 이영; 達善君李泳; December 20, 1731 – January 16, 1749). During the process, the Grand Queen Dowager (Queen Inwon, the king's stepmother) commented that the adoptee would become her great-grandson and she hoped to choose another closer relative instead. The adoption ended shortly later, as Lady Seo treated poorly to his adopted son and daughter-in-law, eventually causing Prince Dalseon committed suicide by poisoning himself in 1749; after his death, the adoption relationship between Nakcheon and Dalseon was annulled in 1750.

As King Jeongjo succeeded to the throne in 1776, Prince Eunsin, the new king's late half-brother, was appointed to be the new heir to Prince Yeollyeong, but not as an heir to Prince Nakcheon. The status of Prince Nakcheon being the adopted son of Prince Yeollyeong was also annulled during Jeongjo's reign. In 1819, during the reign of Sunjo, some officials suggested making either Prince Eunsin or another relative to be the heir to Prince Nakcheon, but the proposal was not approved.

During the time of Korea under Japanese rule in 1940, the graves of Prince Nakcheon and his family were moved to Yesan County in South Chungcheong Province, as Keijō (now Seoul) was under a land consolidation.

== See also ==
- Prince Yeollyeong
- Prince Eunsin
- Prince Namyeon
- Prince Kyeongchang
- Heungseon Daewongun
