= Prince Eunsin =

Korean prince (1755–1771)

Prince Eunsin 은신군
- Duke of Somin (소민공; 昭愍公) (posthumously); Duke of Chungheon (충헌공; 忠獻公) (posthumously)
- Born: Yi Jin (이진; 李禛); 1755; Hanseong, Joseon
- Died: 1771 (aged 17); Jeju, Joseon
- Spouse: Lady Hong of the Namyang Hong clan
- Issue: Prince Namyeon (adopted)
- House: House of Yi
- Father: Crown Prince Sado
- Mother: Royal Noble Consort Suk of the Buan Im clan (biological); Crown Princess Consort Hyegyeong of the Pungsan Hong clan (legal)
- Religion: Confucianism

- Prince Eunsin
- Hangul: 이진
- Hanja: 李禛
- RR: I Jin
- MR: I Chin

Royal title
- Hangul: 은신군
- Hanja: 恩信君
- RR: Eunsingun
- MR: Ŭnsin'gun

Courtesy name
- Hangul: 신재
- Hanja: 愼哉
- RR: Sinjae
- MR: Sinjae

Posthumous name
- Hangul: 소민, 충헌
- Hanja: 昭愍, 忠獻
- RR: Somin, Chungheon
- MR: Somin, Ch'unghŏn

Prince Eunsin (Korean: 은신군; Hanja: 恩信君; 11 January 1755 – 29 March 1771), personal name Yi Jin (Korean: 이진; Hanja: 李禛), was a Korean prince, as the fourth son of Crown Prince Sado, and his concubine, Royal Noble Consort Suk of the Buan Im clan.

He later become the heir of Prince Yeollyeong, the younger half-brother of King Gyeongjong and King Yeongjo.

== Biography ==
Prince Eunsin was the second illegitimate son of Crown Prince Sado, born to Royal Noble Consort Suk of the Buan Im clan. He was the younger brother of Prince Euneon and half-brother of Crown Prince Uiso, Jeongjo of Joseon and Prince Eunjeon.

In 1762, when his father was executed by King Yeongjo for treason, he was left unprotected and in poverty. He and his brother, Prince Euneon, had to borrow money from merchants and from Hong Bong-han, the father of Crown Prince Sado's primary wife, and over time, the two accumulated a substantial debt.

In 1769, Prince Eunsin married Lady Hong of Namyang (1755–1829), daughter of an official named Hong Dae-hyeon. They had no issue.

On February 2, 1771, King Yeongjo sent him to exile in Daejeong, on Jeju Island. Less than two months later, on March 29, he became sick from an epidemic and died, at the age of 16.

== Aftermath ==
In 1776, according to the will of King Yeongjo, King Jeongjo, the prince's older brother, posthumously appointed him to be the heir to Prince Yeollyeong, who was his great-uncle. Whereas being the successor of Prince Yeollyeong, Prince Eunsin was not regarded as the adopted son of Prince Nakcheon, who used to be the heir to Prince Yeollyeong, but he was deprived of the status during the reign of Jeongjo.

On December 12, 1779, he was given the posthumous name "Somin" (소민; 昭愍); it was changed to "Chungheon" (충헌; 忠獻) on February 28, 1871.

In 1815, during the reign of King Sunjo, Yi Chae-jung (이채중), a fifth-great-grandson of King Injo, was appointed to be Prince Eunsin's adopted son. He was given a new name, Yi Gu (이구; 李球), and received the title Prince Namyeon (남연군; 南延君; 1788–1836).

Prince Namyeon was, through his fourth son, Heungseon Daewongun, the biological grandfather of Emperor Gojong of Korea.

== Family ==
- Father:
  - Crown Prince Sado (조선 장조; 13 February 1735 – 12 July 1762)
- Mother:
  - Biological: Royal Noble Consort Suk of the Buan Im clan (숙빈 임씨; ?–1773)
  - Legal: Queen Heongyeong of the Pungsan Hong clan (헌경왕후 홍씨; 6 August 1735 – 13 January 1816)

Consort and issue

- Lady Hong of the Namyang Hong clan (남양군부인 남양 홍씨; 1755 – 21 March 1829) – No issue.

== See also ==
- Prince Euneon
- Crown Prince Sado
- Crown Prince Uiso
- Crown Prince Hyojang
- Prince Nakcheon
- Heungseon Daewongun
