= Kim Koo Museum =

Museum in Seoul, South Korea

Coordinates: 37.54414°N 126.95948°E

Kim Koo Museum & Library

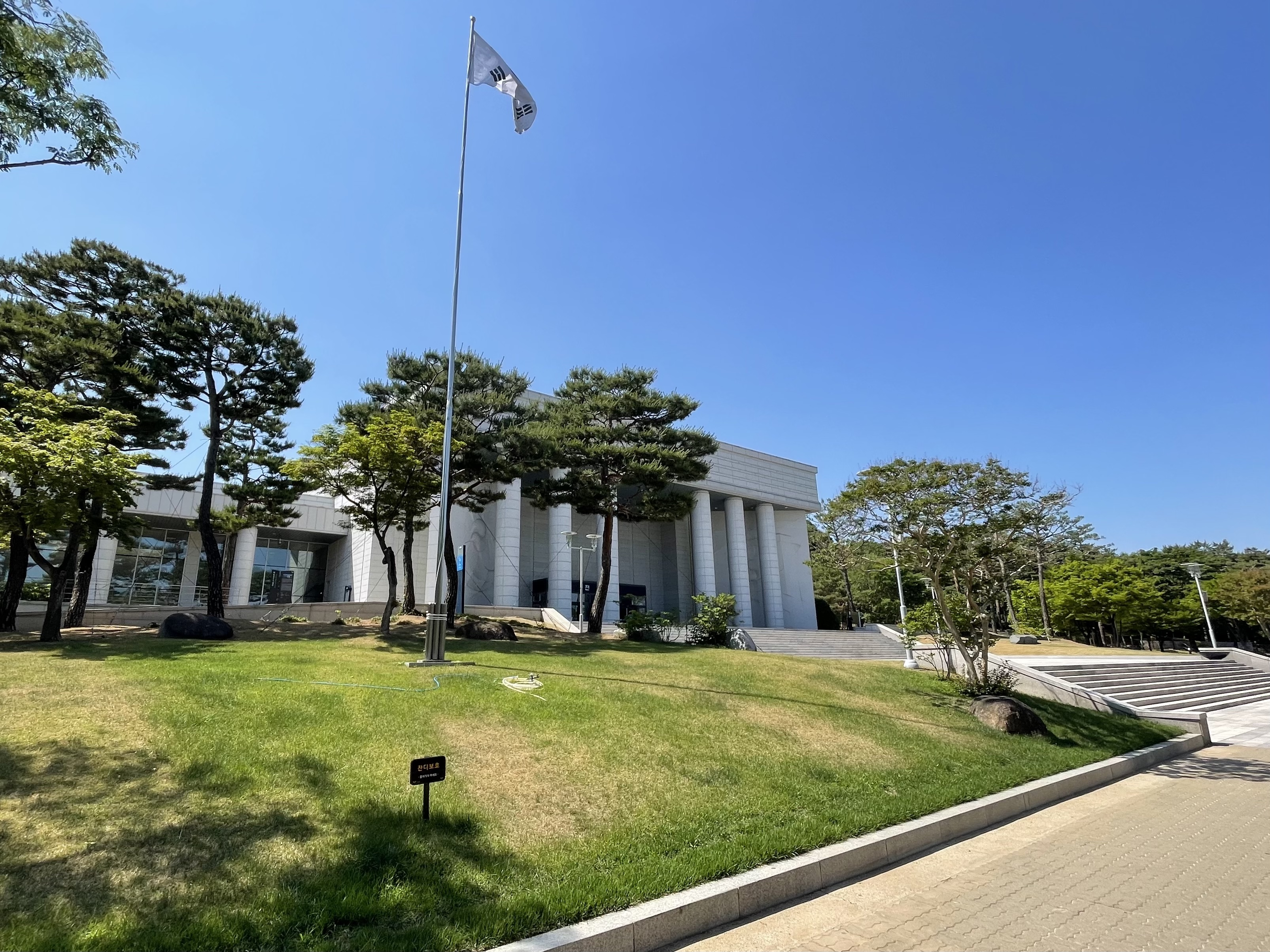
- Museum exterior
- Established: October 22, 2002
- Location: 255 Hyochang-dong, Yongsan District, Seoul, South Korea
- Type: National history museum
- Website: http://www.kimkoomuseum.org/

Korean name
- Hangul: 백범김구기념관
- Hanja: 白凡金九記念館
- RR: Baekbeom Gim Gu ginyeomgwan
- MR: Paekpŏm Kim Ku kinyŏmgwan

The Kim Koo Museum (Korean: 백범김구기념관; Hanja: 白凡金九記念館) is a museum with its own library. Located within Hyochang Park, Hyochang-dong, Yongsan District, Seoul, South Korea, it commemorates the life and work of Kim Ku (also spelled "Kim Koo"), a Korean independence activist during the Japanese occupation of Korea who is less commemorated in North Korea due to his anticommunist views. It opened on October 22, 2002.

== See also ==
- List of museums in South Korea
