= Paek Chŏnggi =

Korean independence activist (1896–1934)

- 백정기
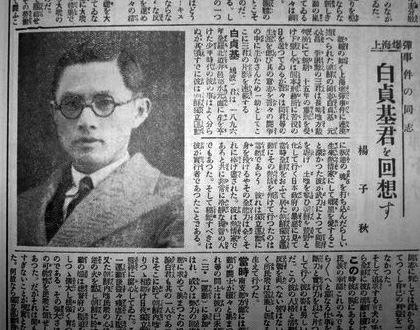
- Paek in a Japanese newspaper (1934)
- Born: 19 January 1896; Buan, North Jeolla, Joseon
- Died: 5 June 1934 (aged 38); Nagasaki, Japan
- Resting place: Hyochang Park; 37°32′42″N 126°57′40″E
- Years active: 1919–1933
- Organization(s): Korean Anarchist Federation; Black Terror Party
- Movement: Anarchism, Korean independence

Korean name
- Hangul: 백정기
- Hanja: 白貞基
- RR: Baek Jeonggi
- MR: Paek Chŏnggi

Art name
- Hangul: 구파
- Hanja: 鷗波
- RR: Gupa
- MR: Kup'a

Courtesy name
- Hangul: 용선
- Hanja: 溶善
- RR: Yongseon
- MR: Yongsŏn

Paek Chŏnggi (Korean: 백정기; Hanja: 白貞基; 19 January 1896 – 5 June 1934) was a Korean anarchist and independence activist. A participant in the March First Movement, he was attracted to socialism and anarchism while he was a student in Japan, going on to join the Korean anarchist movement after moving to China. There he plotted the assassination of a Japanese consul, but he was arrested before he could make the attempt and died in a Japanese prison.

== Biography ==
Paek Chŏnggi was born in 1896. An activist of the March First Movement, in 1919, Paek organised an independence demonstration in his home town and witnessed the movement's suppression in Seoul. He briefly fled to Manchuria, where he was active in the local Korean independence movement. In 1921, Paek moved to Japan and began studying at the University of Tokyo. There he became a socialist, after he started reading the Labor Newspaper (Japanese: 労働新聞, romanized: Rōdō shimbun) and other socialist works. Paek was then attracted to anarchism through the work of Japanese anarchists such as Kōtoku Shūsui and Ōsugi Sakae, as well as that of the Russian anarchist communist Peter Kropotkin.

In 1924, he moved to China, where he joined the Korean anarchists led by Shin Chae-ho. In the Chinese capital of Beijing, Paek gathered together with other Korean anarchists and independence activists, with whom he co-founded the Korean Anarchist Federation in April 1924. Paek then moved to Shanghai, where he worked with the Black Terror Party (BTP), a Korean anarchist terrorist group.

In March 1933, Paek attempted to assassinate a Japanese consul in the Six Three Pavilion Restaurant, as part of a plot by the BTP. But his plans were already known by the Japanese police, due to the work of an informant, and they awaited his arrival at the restaurant. He was arrested before he was able to carry out the attack. Paek and his co-conspirators, Yi Ganghun and Won Simchang, were sentenced to life imprisonment. Paek was transferred to Japan and incarcerated in the prison of Nagasaki, where he died, in 1934.

== Remembrance ==
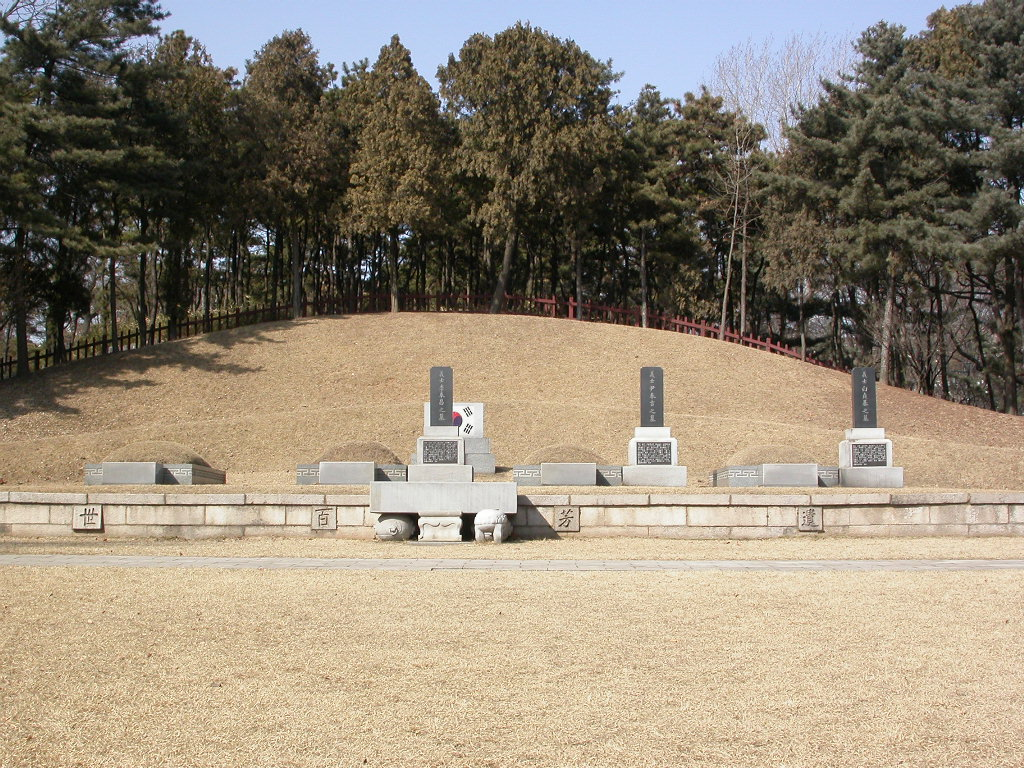
Tomb of the Three Martyrs, in Hyochang Park

On 31 July 1934, the Black Newspaper (흑석신문; Heuksaek sinmun) ran an article that paid tribute to Paek, remembering him as "a rebel who stood on the front line of human liberation". After the surrender of Japan on 15 August 1945, Korea was liberated from Japanese imperial occupation. Paek's remains were repatriated to Korea and buried in Hyochang Park. Paek was interred alongside Lee Bong-chang and Yun Bong-gil, in what became known as the Tomb of the Three Martyrs. Paek's epitaph includes his last words before he died:

I don't expect I will be alive after another couple of months.
Alas, my fellowmen, Try not to be discouraged by my death.

Even if I am dead, these ideals will live on forever,
and you will see the day when they bear fruit.

Brothers, take care of yourselves and after you get out of this prison,
keep on striving for the independence and honor of our country
just as your hearts crave it in this moment.

My only guilt and regret in life
is that I cannot fulfill my duty, as a child, to my elderly mother.

If the day of independence comes,
please take my remains and bury them
in the ground anywhere in my free country,
and lay a rose of Sharon on my grave.

In the 21st century tomb, Paek's tomb is still visited by people paying their respects to Korean independence activists.

== Bibliography ==
- Ko, Gyeong-Hui (July 2018). The Stories of Old Tombs in Korea (PDF) (Master's). Jeju National University. pp. 68–69, 95.
- Hwang, Dongyoun (2007). "Beyond Independence: The Korean Anarchist Press in China and Japan in the 1920s and 1930s". Asian Studies Review. 31 (1): 3–23. doi:10.1080/10357820701196668. ISSN 1035-7823.
- Hwang, Dongyoun (2016). Anarchism in Korea: Independence, Transnationalism, and the Question of National Development, 1919-1984 (PDF). Albany, New York: SUNY Press. pp. 31, 65, 126–127. ISBN 978-1-4384-6167-0. OCLC 1039293708.
