= Princess Yeongon =

- Princess of Joseon
- Born: 11 May 1817; Changdeokgung, Hanseong, Joseon
- Died: 8 April 1829 (aged 11–12); Changdeokgung, Hanseong, Joseon
- Burial: Seosamneung Cluster, Wondang-dong, Deogyang District, Goyang, Gyeonggi Province, South Korea
- House: House of Yi
- Father: Sunjo of Joseon
- Mother: Royal Consort Sug-ui of the Miryang Park clan

Princess Yeongon (Korean: 영온 옹주; Hanja: 永溫 翁主; 1817–1829) was the daughter of King Sunjo of Joseon and Royal Consort Sug-ui of the Miryang Park clan.

== Biography ==
Princess Yeongon was born on May 11, 1817, as the only child of King Sunjo by his concubine, Royal Consort Sug-ui of the Miryang Park clan. She was the younger half-sister of Crown Prince Hyomyeong.

In 1827 (2nd year of her father's reign), she was granted the title of Princess Yeongon (영온 옹주).

She was said to have been frequently ill as a child and spoke with difficulty.

Princess Yeongon died in 1829. Crown Prince Hyomyeong, who would visit and take care of his sister whenever she fell ill, died a year after her, on June 25, 1830. Many believe that he died from a broken heart.

The Princess's tomb was originally located at Hyochang-dong, Yongsan District, Seoul, but was relocated during the Japanese Colonial period to Seosamneung, in Goyang, along with her birth mother, Lady Park.

== Family ==
- Father: Yi Gong, King Sunjo (조선 순조; 29 August 1790 – 13 December 1834)
  - Grandfather: Yi San, King Jeongjo (조선 정조; 28 October 1752 – 18 August 1800)
  - Grandmother: Royal Noble Consort Su of the Bannam Park clan (수빈 반남 박씨; 1 June 1770 – 6 February 1823)
- Mother: Royal Consort Sug-ui of the Miryang Park clan (숙의 밀양 박씨; ?–1854)

== In popular culture ==
- Portrayed by Heo Jung-eun in the 2016 KBS2 TV series Love in the Moonlight. In this series, the Princess appears with her name is Princess Yeongeun (영은옹주).
