= Hyochang Stadium =

Stadium in Seoul, South Korea

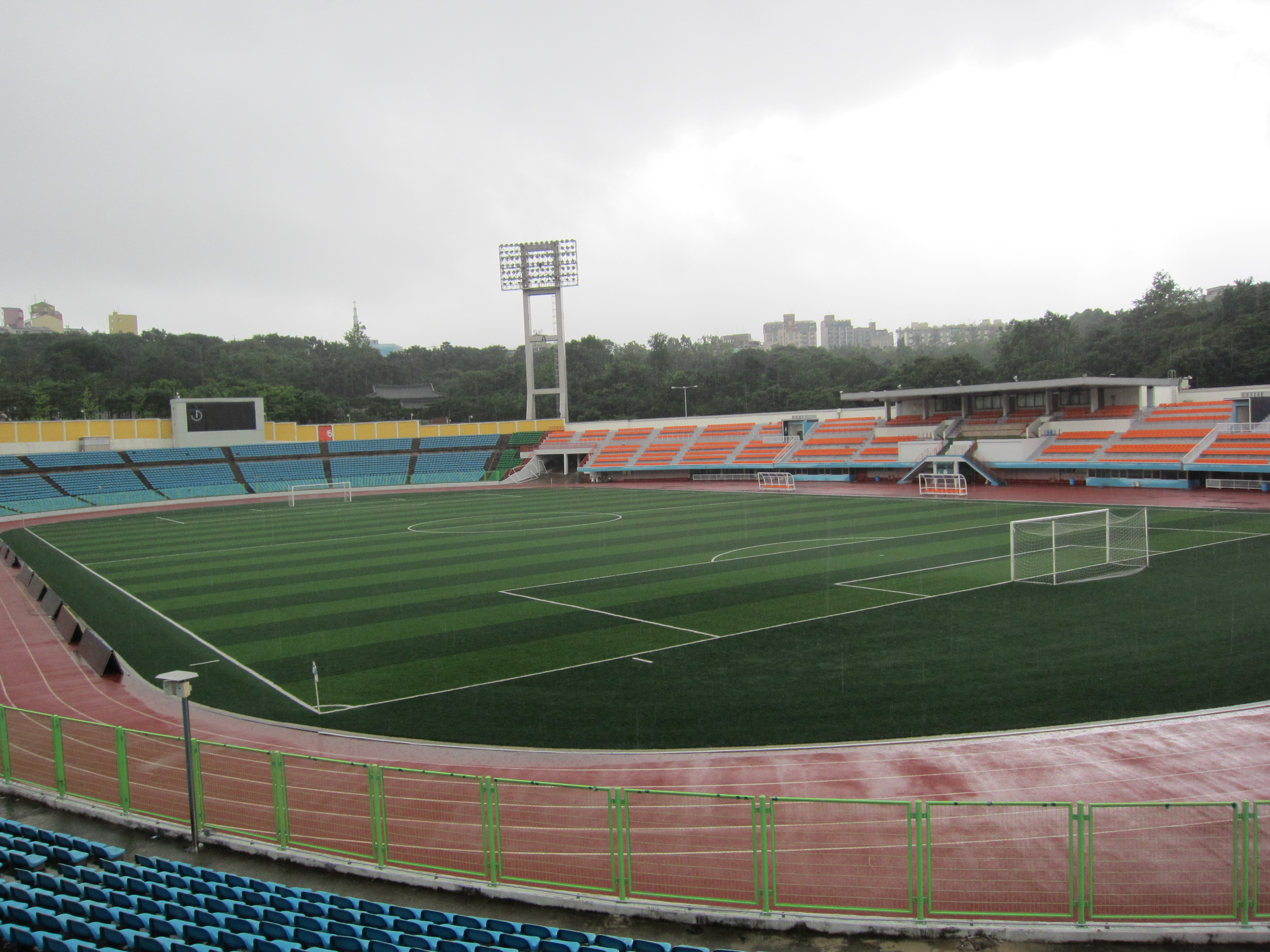
- Interactive map of Hyochang Stadium
- Location: Hyochang-dong, Yongsan District, Seoul, South Korea
- Coordinates: 37.543522°N 126.961344°E
- Operator: Seoul Facilities Management Corporation
- Capacity: 15,194
- Surface: Artificial turf
- Designation

Seoul Future Heritage
- Reference no.: 2013-296

Construction
- Groundbreaking: November 19, 1959
- Opened: October 12, 1960
- Renovated: 1983
- Cost: 200 million won

Tenants
- Seoul United (2009–2010); Seoul City WFC (2015–2019)

Hyochang Stadium (Korean: 효창운동장; Hanja: 孝昌運動場) is a multi-purpose stadium in Hyochang-dong, Yongsan District, Seoul, South Korea. It is currently used mostly for football matches. The stadium has a capacity of 15,194 people. It was built in October 1960 for the 1960 AFC Asian Cup.

== See also ==
- Seoul World Cup Stadium
- Jamsil Olympic Stadium
- Mokdong Stadium
- Dongdaemun Stadium

Preceded by Government Stadium; Hong Kong	AFC Asian Cup; Host Venue; 1960	Succeeded by Ramat Gan Stadium (Israel) Ramat Gan
