= Sugui Park =

Joseon royal consort (fl. 19th century)

- Royal Consort of the Junior Second Rank
- Born: Before 1800; Joseon
- Died: 24 July 1854; Hanseong, Joseon
- Burial: Seosamneung Cluster, Goyang, South Korea
- Consort of: Sunjo of Joseon
- Issue: Princess Yeongon
- Clan: Miryang Park (by birth); Jeonju Yi (by marriage)
- Dynasty: Yi

Korean name
- Hangul: 숙의 박씨
- Hanja: 淑儀 朴氏
- RR: Sugui Bakssi
- MR: Sugŭi Pakssi

Sugui Park (Korean: 숙의 박씨; Hanja: 淑儀 朴氏; ? – 24 July 1854), of the Miryang Park clan, was a consort of Sunjo of Joseon.

== In popular culture ==
- Portrayed by Jeon Mi-seon in the 2016 KBS2 TV series Love in the Moonlight.
