= Princess Ch'ŏngyŏn =

Princess of Joseon (1754–1821)

Princess Ch'ŏngyŏn 청연공주
- Princess of Joseon
- Born: 1754; Hanseong, Kingdom of Joseon
- Died: 9 July 1821 (aged 66–67); Hanseong, Kingdom of Joseon
- Burial: Gwangju, Gyeonggi Province
- Spouse: Kim Gi-seong, Prince Consort Gwangeun
- Issue: 2 sons and 1 daughter
- House: Jeonju Yi (by birth); Gwangsan Kim (by marriage)
- Father: Crown Prince Sado
- Mother: Lady Hyegyeong

Princess Ch'ŏngyŏn (청연공주; 14 July 1754 – 7 July 1821) was a royal princess of the Joseon Dynasty. She was the eldest daughter of Crown Prince Sado and Lady Hyegyeong.

== Life ==
Princess Ch'ŏngyŏn was born in the 30th year of Yeongjo’s reign as the eldest daughter of Crown Prince Sado and Crown Princess Consort Hye She had two older brothers, Crown Prince Uiso and Jeongjo of Joseon, and one younger sister, Princess Cheongseon. But her eldest brother later died in infancy.

Because Princess Ch'ŏngyŏn was the daughter of the Crown Prince, she held the title of Commandery Princess (군주 ), a senior 2 rank and thus known throughout her life as Princess Ch'ŏngyŏn (청연군주, 淸衍郡主).

In 1765, the 41st reign of King Yeongjo, she married Kim Du‐Seong (김두성) of the Gwangsan Kim clan, son of Kim Sang-ik (김상익). Kim Du-Seong changed his name to Kim Gi-Seong (김기성).

She died on July 7, 1821. She was honoured by Emperor Gojong as Princess Ch'ŏngyŏn (청연공주) and her husband was posthumously awarded the title of Prince Consort Gwangeun (광은위).

== Family ==
Parents

- Father: Crown Prince Sado (사도세자; 13 February 1735 – 12 July 1762)
  - Grandfather: King Yeongjo of Joseon (조선 영조; 31 October 1694 – 22 April 1776)
  - Grandmother: Royal Noble Consort Yeong of the Jeonui Yi clan (영빈 전의 이씨; 15 August 1696 — 23 August 1764)
    - Adoptive grandmother: Queen Jeongseong of the Daegu Seo clan (정성왕후 서씨; 12 January 1693 – 3 April 1757)
- Mother: Lady Hyegyeong of the Pungsan Hong clan (혜경궁 풍산 홍씨; 6 August 1735 – 13 January 1816)
  - Grandfather: Hong Bong-han (홍봉한; 1713 – 1778)
  - Grandmother: Internal Princess Consort Hansan of the Hansan Yi clan (한산부부인 한산 이씨; 1713 – 1755)

Siblings

- Older Brother: Yi Jeong, Crown Prince Uiso (의소세자 이정; 27 September 1750 – 17 April 1752)
- Older Brother: Yi San, Jeongjo of Joseon (왕세손 이산; 28 October 1752 – 18 August 1800)
- Younger Sister: Princess Cheongseon (청선공주; 1756 – 20 July 1802)

Spouse

- Husband: Kim Gi-seong, Prince Consort Gwangeun (김기성 광은위; 1752 –1811)
  - Father-in-law: Kim Sang-ik (김상익; 1721–1781)
  - Mother-in-law: Lady Hong (홍씨; 1722–1786)

Issue

- Son: Kim Jae-chang (김재창, 金在昌; 1770–1849)
  - Daughter-in-law: Lady Lee (이씨, 李氏; 1770–1818)
- Daughter: Lady Kim of the Gwangsan Kim clan (광산 김씨; 1772–1787)
  - Son-in-law: Jo Jae-gyu (조재규) of the Imcheon Jo clan (임천 조씨; 1772–1843)
- Son: Kim Jae-sam (김재삼; 1775–1837)
  - Daughter-in-law: Lady Yi (이씨, 李氏; 1776–1852)

== Popular culture ==
- Portrayed by Seol Ji-yun in the CGV TV series Eight Days, Assassination Attempts against King Jeongjo (2007)
- Portrayed by Kim I-on in MBC TV series The Red Sleeve (2021)
