= Lady Hyegyeong =

Korean writer and royal (1735–1816)

Queen Heongyeong 헌경왕후

Crown Princess of Joseon
- Tenure: 1744–12 July 1762
- Predecessor: Crown Princess Jo
- Successor: Crown Princess Kim
- Born: 6 August 1735; Bansongbang, Hanseong, Joseon
- Died: 13 January 1816 (aged 80); Gyeongchunjeon Hall, Changgyeonggung, Hanseong, Joseon
- Burial: Yungneung Tombs, Hwaseong, Gyeonggi Province, South Korea
- Spouse: Crown Prince Sado (m. 1744–1762)
- Issue: Yi Jeong, Crown Prince Uiso; Yi San, King Jeongjo; Princess Cheongyeon; Princess Cheongseon
Posthumous name
- 효강자희정선휘목유정인철계성헌경왕후 (孝康慈禧貞宣徽穆裕靖仁哲啓聖獻敬王后); 헌경의황후 (獻敬懿皇后)
- House: Pungsan Hong clan (by birth); Jeonju Yi clan (by marriage)
- Father: Hong Bong-han
- Mother: Internal Princess Consort Hansan of the Hansan Yi clan

- Lady Hyegyeong
- Hangul: 헌경왕후
- Hanja: 獻敬王后
- RR: Heongyeong wanghu
- MR: Hŏn'gyŏng wanghu

Lady Hyegyŏng of the Pungsan Hong clan (Korean: 혜경궁 풍산 홍씨; Hanja: 惠慶宮 豊山 洪氏; 6 August 1735 – 13 January 1816), also known as Queen Hŏngyŏng (헌경왕후; 獻敬王后), (Note: Lady Hyegyŏng was firstly given the posthumous title Queen Gyeongui (경의왕후; 敬懿王后), but this title has been dismissed after receiving her other title Queen Heongyeong (헌경왕후; 獻敬王后) after her death.) was a Korean writer and Crown Princess during the Joseon period. She was the wife of Crown Prince Sado and mother of King Jeongjo. In 1903, Emperor Gojong gave her the posthumous name of Heongyeong, the Virtuous Empress (헌경의황후; 獻敬懿皇后). After the death of her husband, Lady Hyegyŏng wrote The Memoirs of Lady Hyegyŏng (한중록; Hanjungnok; lit. "A Record of Sorrowful Days"), a collection of four narratives recounting the stories of her family.

== Early life ==
Known in her early life as Lady Hong, Lady Hyegyŏng was born on 6 August 1735, as the third child and second daughter of the scholar Hong Bong-han of the Pungsan Hong clan and his first wife, Lady Yi of the Hansan Yi clan.

In her memoirs, Lady Hyegyŏng recalls being very attached to her parents, sleeping in her parents' room and accompanying her mother during her confinement for the birth of her brother, Hong Nak-sin. Lady Hyegyŏng's parent's marriage suffered strain after the death of her paternal grandfather, Hong Hyeon-bo (홍현보; 洪鉉輔; 1680–1740), but the couple reconciled when the young Lady Hyegyŏng refused to eat. She was taught to read and write vernacular Korean by an aunt-in-law: Lady Shin of the Pyeongsan Shin clan (평산 신씨; 1722–?).

=== Selection as Crown Princess ===
In 1743, a royal edict was sent out requesting that families with eligible girls submit their names for the selection of a wife for the Crown Prince Sado, the son of King Yeongjo. Lady Yi was unwilling to submit her nine-year-old daughter for consideration, but her husband insisted and sent in Lady Hyegyŏng's name himself. For the first selection process, the Hong family was not particularly wealthy, so Lady Yi stitched outfits suitable for presentation at court from old clothes. Lady Hyegyŏng thought that she would be too young to be successful, but she was summoned to a private audience with the crown prince's mother and eldest sister. During the second presentation, although three girls were selected, Lady Hyegyŏng recounts in her memoir that "it appeared as though the decision had already been made" to wed her to Prince Sado. Furthermore, King Yeongjo remarked how he had "found a beautiful daughter-in-law" during their meeting. As Lady Hyegyŏng was the great-great-great granddaughter of Princess Jeongmyeong, a daughter of Seonjo of Joseon and Queen Inmok, and King Yeongjo was descended from Prince Jeongwon, a half-brother of Princess Jeongmyeong, Lady Hyegyŏng and King Yeongjo were also fifth cousins.

The nine-year-old Lady Hyegyŏng moved into a pavilion outside the palace, where she was tutored for a month by her parents and palace staff. The wedding ceremony between Lady Hyegyŏng and the nine-year-old Crown Prince Sado was held over a period of seven days in the first month of 1744.

== Palace life ==
Lady Hyegyŏng's family initially enjoyed a close relationship with their royal in-laws and her father was employed in various official roles during his lifetime, even tutoring Crown Prince Sado early in his daughter's marriage. Lady Hyegyŏng recalls that Prince Sado started displaying strange behavior as early as 1745, at several points even losing consciousness. Their marriage was consummated in the same month in 1749 as the 14-year-old Prince Sado's second capping ceremony.

Lady Hyegyŏng gave birth to her first child in 1750, a son named Ǔiso; however, he died in the spring of 1752. Later the same year, she had another son named Yi San. The birth of a male heir so soon after the death of her eldest son pleased the royal court, King Yeongjo, and especially Lady Hyegyŏng and Prince Sado. The crown Princess later gave birth to her first daughter, Princess Cheongyeon in 1754, and another daughter, Princess Cheongseon, in 1756.

=== Crown Prince Sado's illness ===
During their marriage, Prince Sado showed signs of increasingly severe mental illnesses. The symptoms included fearing thunder and a certain Daoist scripture, (Note: This was the Jade Spine scripture (Korean: 옥추경)) an inability to speak before his father, and a wish for death. After an argument with his father in 1756, Sado berated an official and, in his haste to pursue him, knocked over a candlestick that started a fire, burning down several buildings. Lady Hyegyŏng, despite being five months pregnant with Princess Cheongseon, ran to collect her son. After this incident, Lady Hyegyŏng expressed her heartache at the actions of her husband, who had told King Yeongjo that he set the fire on purpose. When King Yeongjo discovered in 1757 that Prince Sado had fathered a daughter, Princess Cheonggeun, with a secondary consort, Court Lady Park, he criticised Lady Hyegyŏng severely for helping Sado hide this. Afterwards, Lady Hyegyŏng disguised the woman and snuck her out of the palace, hiding her at the home of Princess Hwawan.

Lady Hyegyŏng attempted to support her husband in his illness. Her role in his life included procuring sufficient cloth to make multiple sets of clothes, as the prince's "clothing phobia" that arose in 1757 caused him to often burn outfits before selecting one to wear. In June of 1757, Prince Sado entered their pavilion holding the severed head of a eunuch, which he forced Lady Hyegyŏng and her ladies-in-waiting to view. Later, he became violent towards the ladies-in-waiting, causing Lady Hyegyŏng to report to his mother, Royal Noble Consort Yeong, that his illness was worsening. Royal Noble Consort Yeong wanted to speak to Prince Sado, but was persuaded not to, as Lady Hyegyŏng said she feared for her own safety if he found out that his wife had spoken to others about it. In her memoirs, Lady Hyegyŏng describes fearing for the safety of herself and her children when Prince Sado was having manic episodes. She recalled how Prince Sado threw a go board at her in 1760, which hit her in the face and caused such a large bruise around her eye that she had to miss a ceremony for King Yeongjo's moving house.

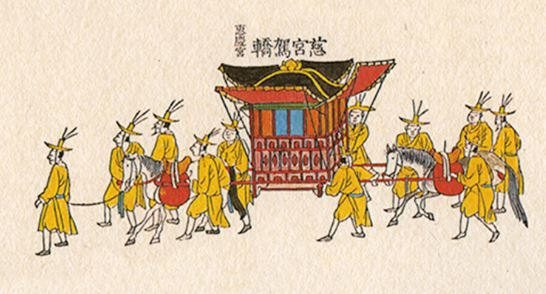
Section of a scroll painted in 1795 showing Lady Hyegyŏng's palanquin on its way to visit Prince Sado's tomb.

In 1762, Prince Sado summoned his wife to his chambers. Gripped by anxiety, Lady Hyegyŏng first visited her son Yi San to assuage him. On arriving, Prince Sado requested that she bring him their son's cap to wear to meet his father, but Lady Hyegyŏng presented him with his own cap. When he left, Lady Hyegyŏng returned to her son, where she later heard a eunuch requesting a rice chest from the kitchens. At this, Yi San ran outside to beg for his father's life and Lady Hyegyŏng attempted suicide with a knife, but was stopped. She then went to the wall next to the courtyard where Sado was being sentenced by King Yeongjo and listened to her husband beg for his life.

Lady Hyegyŏng wrote a letter begging clemency of King Yeongjo for herself and Yi San, as well as allowance to stay with her father. The same day, her elder brother arrived with an edict to escort her to her father's home. Lady Hyegyŏng was carried to a palanquin, within which she fainted. Yi San later joined his mother at his maternal grandfather Hong Bong-han's house, along with his consort and younger sisters. Eight days later, Prince Sado was pronounced dead and Lady Hyegyŏng returned to the palace for the mourning rituals.

== Aftermath ==
Crown Prince Sado's death was carried out in such a way as to avoid labelling it a criminal execution, which would also sentence his entire family to death. This saved the life of Yi San, but Lady Hyegyŏng would have been expected commit suicide and follow Prince Sado into death; however, she ultimately made the decision to remain alive and support her son and grandson during their reigns. While Chŏngjo's relationship to his mother and her natal family was at times strained, his son, Lady Hyegyŏng's grandson, King Sunjo, is said to have been particularly devoted to her.

Between the years of 1795 and 1806, Lady Hyegyǒng wrote The Memoirs of Lady Hyegyŏng (한중록; Hanjungnok; lit. "A Record of Sorrowful Days"), in Hangul—not literary Chinese—each a different narrative or argument. Her first memoir, The Memoir of 1795, provides a general autobiographical recounting of her life. The Memoir of 1801 and The Memoir of 1802 are Lady Hyegyŏng's second and third memoirs; they both consider her son, Yi San, as well as the execution of her elder brother. In Lady Hyegyŏng's final memoir, The Memoir of 1805, she provides her account on the illness and death of her husband, the Crown Prince Sado. The first of the four volumes is dedicated to her nephew, while the other three are dedicated to her grandson, King Sunjo.

== Titles ==
- 6 August 1735 – January 1744: Lady Hong, daughter of Hong Bong-han, of the Pungsan Hong clan
- January 1744 – 12 July 1762: Her Highness, The Crown Princess of Joseon (왕세자빈; 王世子嬪)
- 12 July 1762 – 17 April 1776: Her Highness, The Crown Princess Dowager of Joseon (왕세자대빈; 王世 子大嬪)
  - Crown Princess Consort Hye (혜빈; 惠嬪)
- 17 April 1776 – 13 January 1816: Her Highness, Lady Hyegyŏng (혜경궁; 惠慶宮)
- Posthumous title: Queen Heongyeong (헌경왕후; 興慶王后)

== Family ==
- Father
  - Hong Bong-han (홍봉한; 洪鳳漢; 1713–1778)
- Mother
  - Internal Princess Consort Hansan of the Hansan Yi clan (한산부부인 한산 이씨; 韓山府夫人 韓山 李氏; 1713–1755)
- Siblings
  - Older brother: Hong Nag-in (홍낙인; 洪樂仁; 1729 – 19 June 1777)
  - Older sister: Lady Hong of the Pungsan Hong clan (풍산 홍씨; 豊山 洪氏; 1730–1735)
  - Younger brother: Hong Nak-sin (홍낙신; 洪樂信; 1739–1796)
  - Younger brother: Hong Nak-im (홍낙임; 洪樂任; 1741–1801)
  - Younger sister: Lady Hong of the Pungsan Hong clan (풍산 홍씨; 豊山 洪氏; 1743–?)
  - Younger half-brother: Hong Nak-jwa (홍낙좌; 1750–?) (Note: Him and his younger brothers were conceived by Hong Bong-han's concubine, Lady Kim of the Gimhae Kim clan (김해 김씨; 1720–?).)
  - Younger brother: Hong Nak-ryun (홍낙륜; 洪樂倫; November 1750 – 1813)
  - Younger half-brother: Hong Nak-woo ( 홍낙우, 洪樂佑; 1752–?)
  - Younger half-brother: Hong Nak-dong (홍낙동; 1754–?)
  - Younger half-brother: Hong Nak-yi (홍낙이; 1756–?)
- Husband
  - Yi Seon, Crown Prince Sado (이선 사도세자; 13 February 1735 – 12 July 1762)
    - Father-in-law: Yi Geum, King Yeongjo of Joseon (조선 영조; 31 October 1694 – 22 April 1776)
    - Mother-in-law: Royal Noble Consort Yeongbin Yi (영빈 이씨; 15 August 1696 – 23 August 1764)
      - Legal mother-in-law: Queen Jeongseong of the Daegu Seo clan (정성왕후 서씨; 12 January 1693 – 3 April 1757)
      - Legal mother-in-law: Queen Jeongsun of the Gyeongju Kim clan (정순왕후 김씨; 2 December 1745 – 11 February 1805)
- Issue
  - Yi Jeong, Crown Prince Uiso (이정 의소세자; 27 September 1750 – 17 April 1752)
  - Yi San, King Jeongjo of Joseon (조선 정조; 28 October 1752 – 18 August 1800)
  - Princess Cheongyeon (청연공주; 1754 – 9 June 1821)
  - Princess Cheongseon (청선공주; 1756 – 20 July 1802)

== In popular culture ==
=== Film and television ===
- Portrayed by Choi Myung-gil in the 1988 MBC TV series The Memoirs of Lady Hyegyeong.
- Portrayed by Ha Hee-ra in the 1988 KBS TV series Heaven Heaven.
- Portrayed by Hong Ri-Na in the 1998 MBC TV series The Great King's Road
- Portrayed by Kyeon Mi-ri in the 2007 MBC TV series Lee San, Wind of the Palace.
- Portrayed by Jung Ae-ri in the 2007 CGV TV series Eight Days, Assassination Attempts against King Jeongjo.
- Portrayed by Kim Sung-ryung in the 2014 film The Fatal Encounter.
- Portrayed by Park Eun-bin in the 2014 SBS TV series Secret Door.
- Portrayed by Moon Geun-young in the 2015 film The Throne.
- Portrayed by Kang Mal-geum in 2021 TV series The Red Sleeve.

=== Literature ===
- The novel The Red Queen by Margaret Drabble is based on the story of Lady Hyegyŏng.
