= Sukbin Choe =

Joseon royal consort (1670–1718)

- Royal Consort of the Senior First Rank
- Born: 17 December 1670; Joseon
- Died: 9 April 1718 (aged 47); Changuigung, Hanseong, Joseon
- Burial: Soryeongwon, Paju, South Korea
- Consort of: King Sukjong
- Issue Detail: 3 sons
Regnal name
- Hwideok Ansun Subok (휘덕안순수복; 徽德安純綏福) (Note: Known as honorific name (존호; 尊號) in the Sinosphere, its closest equivalent in the English-speaking world is the regnal name.)
Posthumous name
- Concubine Hwagyeong Suk (화경숙빈; 和敬淑嬪)
- Clan: Haeju Choe (by birth); Jeonju Yi (by marriage)
- Dynasty: Yi
- Father: Choe Hyo-won
- Mother: Lady, of the Namyang Hong clan
- Religion: Buddhism

Korean name
- Hangul: 숙빈 최씨
- Hanja: 淑嬪 崔氏
- RR: Sukbin Choessi
- MR: Sukpin Ch'oessi

Sukbin Choe (Korean: 숙빈 최씨; Hanja: 淑嬪 崔氏; 17 December 1670 – 9 April 1718), or Concubine Suk, (Note: The literal translation of bin (빈; 嬪) is "concubine". Combined with the honorific title suk (숙; 淑), the full meaning is "Pure Concubine".) of the Haeju Choe clan, was a consort of King Sukjong, the 19th monarch of Joseon, and the biological mother of King Yeongjo. She is one of the most well-known royal consorts in Korean history.

== Biography ==
=== Early life ===
Lady Choe was born during the reign of King Hyeonjong, as the youngest child among one son and two daughters. Her father was Choe Hyo-won and her mother was a lady from the Namyang Hong clan.

=== Palace maid ===
Lady Choe entered the palace at a young age. She belonged to the cheonmin, which was the lowest class during the Joseon period. It is unknown how her first encounter with the king happened. The most accepted version is that she was a musuri (a maid doing miscellaneous work in the palace) during the time when Queen Min (posthumously Queen Inhyeon) was exiled and Jang Ok-jeong had attained the status of queen. One night, Lady Choe was praying for the deposed queen's well-being when the king, who was returning to the palace from a trip, overheard her and was moved by her words. The book Sumunrok (수문록) authored by Yi Mun-jeong (이문정; 1656–1726) describes the encounter as follows:

"One night, the King [Sukjong] couldn't sleep, and suffering from insomnia decided to go out. When returning to the palace and passing by the servants' chambers, he suddenly heard sobbing coming from a small room. Out of curiosity, he took a peep into the room, then to his surprise in this neat and tidy room, he saw there was a setup of an offering for a banquet. He then saw a young musuri dressed in her official uniform, weeping bitterly in front of the table set for a memorial ritual. The memorial tablet was set for the former Queen Min. The King was surprised, since Queen Min had been deposed. The musuri had placed the memorial tablet because the deposed Queen Min had sacrificed herself for the King's sake. But fearing Queen Jang's influence, no one dared to commemorate the deposed Queen Min, as no one wanted to be accused and executed. The King was surprised that even under these perilous circumstances someone dared to risk death to honor and pray for Queen Min's well being, and he spoke to her. The musuri heard his voice, and turning around, was stunned to see the King. Recognizing him, she knelt before him and he asked her for an explanation. The musuri answered with a trembling voice, "Your Majesty, I used to serve under the Deposed Queen when she was queen. Today is her birthday, I cannot forget the kindness that the Deposed Queen rendered to me when I served under her, thus privately I set a memorial for her. Please punish me with death." Hearing such an extreme plea, the King was taken aback and was astonished. Others in her situation would have played safe and not put themselves at risk, but this musuri risked death to honor her former master. Commendable and virtuous indeed was she and the King, finding himself witnessing this, was moved. He then brought the young musuri to his bedchamber. His feelings turned from sympathy into fondness and then into love, and he spent many nights with her. Over time, this musuri came to be known as Sukbin Choe."

=== Royal consort ===
Lady Choe's status within the palace rose rapidly. In 1693, she became a royal consort of the junior fourth rank (숙원; sugwon), after giving birth to a prince who died in infancy. One year later, she was elevated to the junior second rank (숙의; sugui), after giving birth to another son, Yi Geum (later Prince Yeoning, the future King Yeongjo). The following year, she was again elevated to the junior first rank (귀인; gwiin). In 1698, she gave birth to a prince who died soon after birth. In 1699, she was promoted to the senior first rank (빈; bin), with the honorific title suk (숙), meaning "pure".

Lady Choe openly supported Queen Min and was against Jang Ok-jeong, whom history has recorded as an evil and cruel woman. By 1693, the king was growing disillusioned with Queen Jang and the Namin faction. In 1694, King Sukjong brought back Queen Min and demoted Jang Ok-jeong.

In 1701, Queen Min died of an unknown cause. Some historiographers believe she was poisoned, but this is unconfirmed. According to one version, Sukjong found Jang Ok-jeong in her room with a shaman, making merry over having caused the queen's death through black magic. Another interpretation is based on a vague passage in the Veritable Records of the Joseon Dynasty, which states that it was Lady Choe who told the king that sorcery had been used to bring harm to Queen Min. Under the title "Queen's Will" it is written:

"Sukbin Choe with her usual grace gives tribute to the Queen, and weeping for the one that could not win the heart of the King, she informed the King of the secret."

Furthermore, Min Jin-hu and Min Jin-won, the deceased queen's elder brothers, reported to Sukjong that before her death, Queen Min had told them that her symptoms were strange and everyone thought there must be another reason behind her illness.

Regardless of how the king came to learn of this, he decided to look into the matter and discovered that Jang Ok-jeong had built a shamanist altar within her quarters, where effigies with the name of the queen were found. Later, her ladies-in-waiting declared that she had ordered them to shoot arrows at a portrait of Queen Min three times at day, and had buried dead animals in her palace's garden. Despite the many pleas of the Soron faction to pardon her, the king felt her conduct was too wicked, and in 1701, he ordered that Jang Ok-jeong and all the others involved should die by poisoning. After sentencing her, Sukjong passed a law forbidding royal consorts from being elevated to the position of queen.

A misunderstanding exists that Lady Choe was next in line to become queen, but this has no basis. Two other consorts from the yangban class, Gwiin Park (later Myeongbin Park), who gave birth to a prince in 1699, and Gwiin Kim (later Yeongbin Kim), who was part of the same political faction as Lady Choe, were probably more suited for the position. Lady Choe's low birth was a major impediment as Joseon was a Confucian society ruled by a class system. This clearly affected the life of her son, King Yeongjo, who was threatened at the start of his rule partially because of his biological mother's class. Later, when his rulership was firmly established, he considered it a personal insult if his mother's background was mentioned.

=== Later life ===
Between 1699 and 1702, Lady Choe was the principal benefactor of Gakhwangjeon Hall in Hwaeomsa Temple.

In 1703, Queen Kim (posthumously Queen Inwon) adopted Prince Yeoning, who was known to be her favorite and whom she regarded as her own son.

In 1704, the Veritable Records of the Joseon Dynasty state that for Prince Yeoning's marriage, Sukjong ordered a very grand and expensive ceremony. The nobles complained about the big cost and excessive favoritism showed to the prince, since he was not even the crown prince, but a concubine-born son.

The Veritable Records document that later the same year, Sukjong gifted Ihyeongung (이현궁; 梨峴宮), a large and spacious complex in the capital city, to Lady Choe as her private residence. She later conferred it upon their son to consummate his marriage in 1711.

In 1711, when Queen Kim came down with smallpox, Lady Choe ordered the palace women to go out and look for remedies among the commoners to save the queen, who in the end survived.

In 1716, Lady Choe was taken out of the palace while ill. Later that same year, Sukjong received a message from Prince Yeoning informing him that his mother's health had worsened and asking for more medical help.

In 1717, Sukjong retired from politics and allowed his son, Crown Prince Yun, to take over most of the affairs of the government.

=== Death ===
In 1718, Lady Choe died at the age of 47, in Changuigung, her son's residence. (Note: It was customary for royal consorts to die outside the main palace. Some queens voluntarily decided to leave the palace and die in their own private residences.)

On her spirit tablet, under the description of her character it is written:

"Her disposition and her dignity were absolutely indivisible. She did not scruple on people. She was respectful and always waited on Queen Inhyeon and later on Queen Inwon. Her wisdom and intelligence shone in her interaction with others. She kept to her duty and protocol. She never entered in palace disputes. She spent her days in peace and harmony."

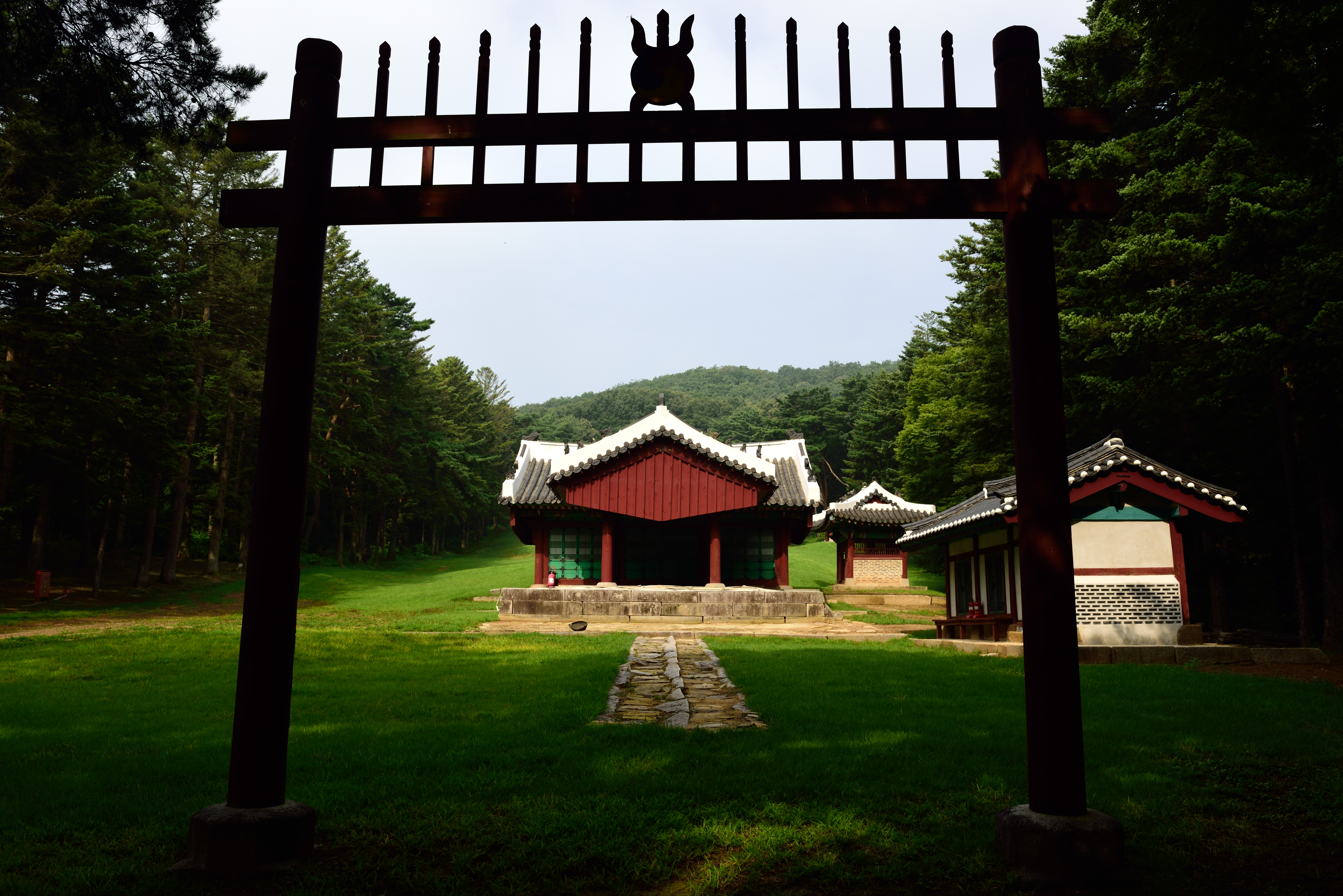
The tomb of Lady Choe

Her tomb is located in Paju, Gyeonggi Province, South Korea. It is called Soryeongwon (소령원; 昭寧園) and was designated as Historical Site No. 358.

Sukjong died in 1720, supposedly after telling Yi I-myeong (이이명) to name Prince Yeoning as Crown Prince Yun's heir.

When her son became king, he set up an altar (제실; jesil) near her tomb, as a display of his deep filial piety. In addition to building memorial halls on the four spots around her grave, he also erected gravestones, the contents of which were written by him in her memory.

Her spirit tablet was enshrined in Chilgung (칠궁), the place which houses the spirit tablets of seven royal consorts who gave birth to kings.

Lady Choe was given the posthumous name Hwagyeong (화경; lit. ''harmonious reverence''). She was further bestowed the honorific name Hwideok Ansun Subok (휘덕안순수복; lit. ''glorious integrity tranquil purity peaceful happiness'').

=== Controversy of rank ===
Her only surviving son was Prince Yeoning, who was known to be a child prodigy and became one of the greatest kings in Joseon's history. King Sukjong was very proud and his treatment of him tended towards the lavish. But because the prince was the son of a low-born concubine, the officials who were born in noble houses and had noble wives maintained a condescending view of him and his biological mother, and were quick to lecture Sukjong on frugality and modesty, despite the king repeatedly ignoring them.

Although King Yeongjo in his adulthood was very sensitive about the origins of his mother, one cannot deny the deep love he had for her. He wrote many poems and said in one of them:

"My father begot me, my mother fed me, led me, bred me, brought me up, reared me, kept her eye on me, tended me, at every turn aided me. Their goods deeds I would requite".

Yeongjo fought the court to have Lady Choe recognized as his public mother, instead of being regarded as a "private parent" like the biological mothers of other kings who were never queens themselves. However, the officials were opposed to it as this meant they would have to honor her and give the king the right to visit her tomb often as part of royal rites.

During the time he was fighting this, there are two interesting accounts of his feelings about the situation. In 1739, the day before the scheduled visit to Lady Choe's tomb, dissatisfied with the protocols that the Ministry of Rites had drawn up, he censured two officials who were directly responsible for them. The Veritable Records explains the measure:

"The King respectfully served his private parent Sukbin Choe, but he suspected that the officials were unwilling to comply with his desire. Thus, on each occasion sudden clashes erupted, inevitably followed by a distressing royal declamation."

On another occasion, Yeongjo was leaving her tomb for the palace. About to mount the palanquin, he instead summoned the Minister of Military Affairs, Kim Son-gung. Breaking into sobs, he said:

"Since 1737, this was the first time I came to pay respect to my mother. For those years, my heart has been filled with sadness. When children fall down, they automatically call out for their mother. This is human nature. At the time of divination, if there is no person offering earth, how can there be a divination? I have sent down orders [to make his birth mother a public or legal mother], but the bureaus in charge have ignored them. True, the ruler is not allowed to have private concerns, but it is wrong to lose trust [in his officials]. The elite scholars of today are just too cold-hearted. Those elite scholars must also have parents. They could not have fallen from Heaven or sprung from earth."

In the end, he got his wish and Lady Choe was recognized as his public mother.

== Titles ==
- During the reign of King Hyeonjong (r. 1659–1674):
  - Lady, of the Haeju Choe clan (해주 최씨; 海州崔氏)
    - Choe Hyo-won's daughter (최효원의 딸)
    - Lady Choe (최씨; 崔氏)
- During the reign of King Sukjong (r. 1674–1720):
  - Palace Lady (궁녀; 宮女; from unknown date)
  - Sugwon (Note: lit. ''Lady of Warm Beauty'') (숙원; 淑媛; from 30 May 1693), royal consort of the junior fourth rank
  - Sugui (Note: lit. ''Lady of Warm Deportment'') (숙의; 淑儀; from 23 July 1694), royal consort of the junior second rank
  - Gwiin (Note: lit. ''Noble Lady'') (귀인; 貴人; from 18 July 1695), royal consort of the junior first rank
  - Concubine Suk (숙빈; 淑嬪; from 13 December 1699), royal consort of the senior first rank
- During the reign of King Yeongjo (r. 1724–1776):
  - Concubine Hwagyeongsuk (화경숙빈; 和敬淑嬪; from unknown date)

== Family ==
- Father: Choe Hyo-won (최효원; 1638–1672)
- Mother: Lady, of the Namyang Hong clan (남양 홍씨; 1639–1673)
- Sibling(s)
  - Sister: Lady, of the Haeju Choe clan (해주 최씨) (Note: Married Seo Jeon (서전).)
  - Brother: Choe Hu (최후)
- Consort of: King Sukjong (숙종대왕; 7 October 1661 – 12 July 1720)
- Issue
  - Unnamed son (3 November 1693 – 14 January 1694) (Note: His childhood name was Yeong-su (영수).)
  - Yi Geum (이금), King Yeongjo (영조대왕; 31 October 1694 – 22 April 1776)
  - Unnamed son (1698)

== Ancestry ==
Ancestors of Sukbin Choe

Choe Eok-ji (최억지)
Choe Mal-jeong (최말정)
Choe Tae-il (최태일)
Lady, of the Pyonggang Jang clan (평강 장씨)
Choe Hyo-won (최효원)
Jang Won (장원)
Lady, of the Pyonggang Jang clan (평강 장씨)
Concubine Suk
Hong In-baek (홍인백)
Hong Gye-nam (홍계남)
Lady, of the Gimhwa Kim clan (김화 김씨)
Lady, of the Namyang Hong clan (남양 홍씨)
Kim Dae-bong (김대봉)
Lady, of the Gangneung Kim clan (강릉 김씨)

== In popular culture ==
- Portrayed by Lee Mi-yeong in the 1981 MBC TV series Women of History: Jang Hui-bin.
- Portrayed by Kyeon Mi-ri in the 1988 MBC TV series 500 Years of Joseon: Queen Inhyeon.
- Portrayed by Nam Joo-hee in the 1995 SBS TV series Jang Hee Bin.
- Portrayed by Kim Young-ae in the 1998 MBC TV series King of the Wind.
- Portrayed by Park Ye-jin in the 2002–2003 KBS2 TV series Royal Story: Jang Hui-bin.
- Portrayed by Han Hyo-joo and Kim Yoo-jung in the 2010 MBC TV series Dong Yi.
- Portrayed by Han Seung-yeon in the 2013 SBS TV series Jang Ok-jung, Living by Love.
- Portrayed by Yoon Jin-seo in the 2016 SBS TV series Jackpot.

== See also ==
- Styles and titles in Joseon
- Society of Joseon
- Political factions of Joseon
- Politics of Joseon
