= Gakhwangjeon Hall =

National treasure of South Korea

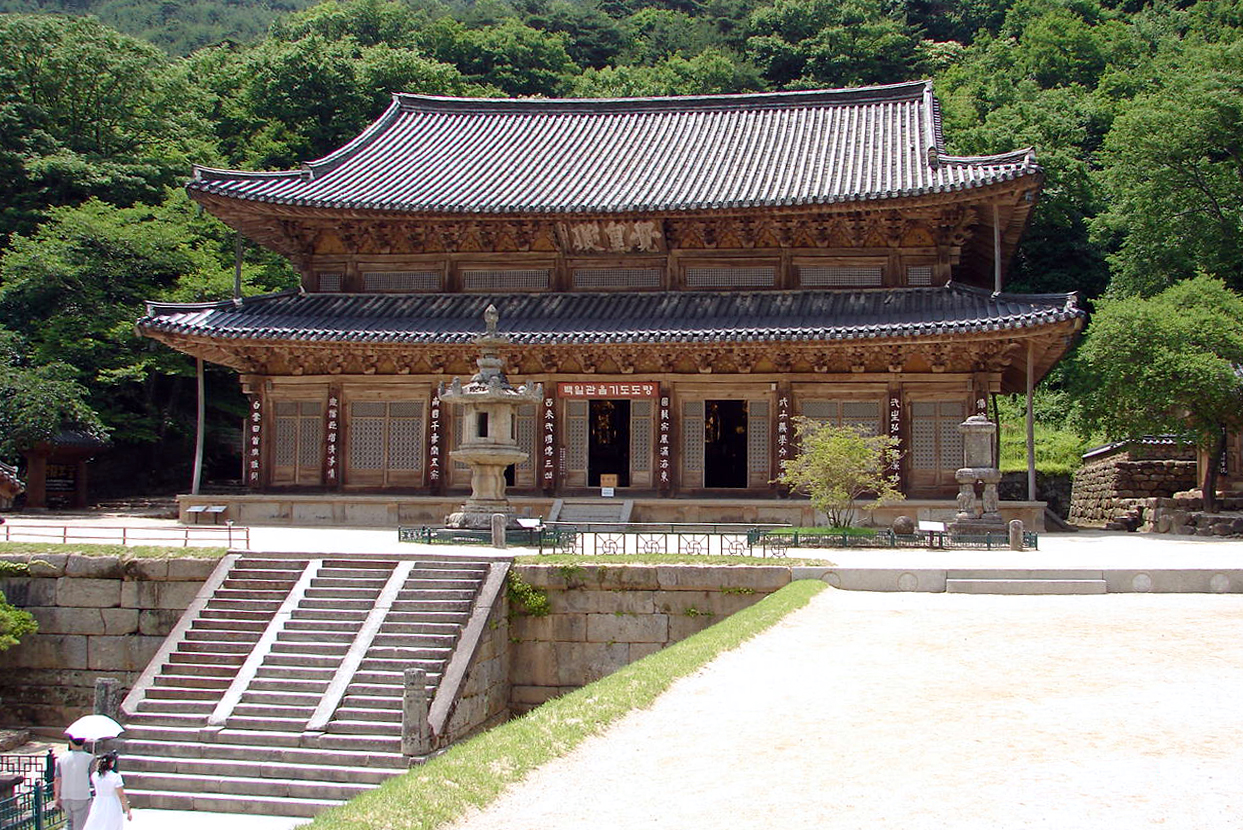
- The building in 2006

Religion
- Affiliation: Korean Buddhism

Location
- Country: South Korea
- Interactive map of Gakhwangjeon Hall
- Coordinates: 35.2572°N 127.4972°E
- Type: National Treasure
- Reference no.: 67

Korean name
- Hangul: 각황전
- Hanja: 覺皇殿
- RR: Gakhwangjeon
- MR: Kakhwangjŏn

Gakhwangjeon Hall (Korean: 각황전) is a hall of worship at Hwaeomsa, a Buddhist temple in Gurye County, South Jeolla Province, South Korea. It is one of the monastery's two principal halls and overlooks the northwest end of the courtyard. In addition to being one of the largest Buddhist halls in South Korea, Gakhwangjeon Hall is registered as National Treasure 67 by the Cultural Heritage Administration.

The largest edifice of Hwaeomsa from the Unified Silla period until the mid-Joseon dynasty was Jangnyukjeon Hall, a multi-story wooden structure whose inner stone walls were inscribed with the Flower Garland Sutra. Jangnyukjeon Hall was destroyed in 1593 when the temple was burned to the ground by the Japanese during the Imjin War. The restoration of Hwaeomsa was begun in 1630 by the monk Byeogam Gakseong but at that time the cost of rebuilding Jangnyukjeon Hall was beyond the temple's means. From 1699 to 1702 the monk Gyepa Seongneung, one of Gakseong's disciples, oversaw the reconstruction of the hall, which was subsequently renamed Gakhwangjeon Hall. The majority of the funding was contributed by Lady Hwagyeong, a consort of King Sukjong, and several noblemen holding senior positions in the government bureaucracy.

Gakhwangjeon Hall was one of the most important feats of mid-Joseon Buddhist architecture. Constructed from wood onto a stone base, the hall is two stories in height and measures seven bays across. It underwent a major renovation in the Japanese colonial period, during which the hall was completely disassembled and then rebuilt. The hall's inner sanctum contains seven altar statues executed in 1703 by the influential sculptor Saengnan. They include the seated Buddha triad of Sakyamuni, Amitābha and Prabhutaratna, representing the Buddhas of the Three Periods, attended by standing Bodhisattva statues of Avalokiteśvara, Samantabhadra, Manjusri and Ksitigarbha. Altar paintings of the three Buddhas were later completed in 1860, although one mistakenly depicts Bhaisajyaguru instead of Prabhutaratna.

== History ==
=== Background ===
During the Unified Silla period Hwaeomsa was a leading Buddhist monastery of the Flower Garland school. Its principle edifice was Jangnyukjeon Hall, a multi-story wooden structure whose inner sanctum had stone plates engraved with the entire Flower Garland Sutra attached to the walls. This building was lost however when Japanese soldiers burned Hwaeomsa to the ground in 1593 during the Imjin War. The temple was restored from 1630 to 1636 by the monk Byeogam Gakseong (1575–1660), who was also responsible for rebuilding some of the most important monasteries of the Joseon dynasty. Gakseong was the senior-most figure in the Righteous Monk Army and had close ties with the Joseon throne, both of which were assumed by successive generations of his disciples. At Hwaeomsa he erected Daeungjeon Hall and several other essential structures but the poor state of the post-war economy made the cost of rebuilding Jangnyukjeon Hall prohibitive.

Records from Hwaeomsa and other monks nevertheless tell that the reconstruction of Jangnyukjeon Hall was Gakseong's dying wish. His cause was initially taken up by a disciple, the eminent monk and man of letters Baegam Seongchong (1631–1700). After a spell as abbot of Yungmusa Seongchong appears to have moved to Hwaeomsa sometime in the 1690s and wrote An Appeal for Alms to Sculpt Icons for and Rebuild Jangnyukjeon Hall of Hwaeomsa, Gurye (求禮華嚴寺重建丈六殿兼造像勸善文) to help solicit contributions. He brought along his student of three years, the monk Gyepa Seongneung (d.1745), whom Seongchong placed in charge of rebuilding the hall. Little has survived about Seongneung's early life. It is recorded in A Chronicle of the Great Temple Hwaeomsa of Jirisan, Honam, Haedong (海東湖南地異山大華嚴寺事蹟; henceforth Hwaeomsa Chronicle), a history of the temple compiled by Jeong Byeongheon (1891–1969), that Seongneung hailed from Yecheon.< (Note: Like Gakseong, Seongneung was a great builder, acquiring the title Enlightening Hero of Adorning the Buddha Land (莊嚴佛國之開士). Following Hwaeomsa, he led the construction of the stupa at Tongdosa (1705) and the fortification of Bukhansanseong (1711). He also appears to have been involved in the repair of Gwanchoksa at Nonsan (1735), and Daeungjeon Hall at Ssanggyesa in Eunjin (1738), where he exercised his formidable talents at soliciting contributions. He returned to Hwaeomsa in 1745 and died in November of that year after publishing Chronicles of Bukhan Fortress (北漢誌). See Lee 1997, pp.98–99)

=== Construction ===
Seongneung began construction work in 1699, although Seongchong himself died in 1700 before it could be completed. The reconstruction was made possible by a combination of the temple's influence, state patronage and royal interest. The principle patrons were Lady Hwagyeong (1670–1718), a royal consort to King Sukjong (r. 1674–1720), and her son Prince Yeoning, who was still but a young child. Records indicate that several notable members of the government were also contributors. These were: Choi Seokjeong (1646–1715), the senior-most member of the bureaucracy; Lee Sebaek (1635–1703), the Second State Councilor; Sin Wan (1646–1707), a Supreme Councilor of the State Council; Oh Doil (1645–1703), the Minister of War; Jo Sangu (b. 1640), a junior second grade official in the ministry of personnel; a royal tutor to the crown prince surnamed Hong; a senior third grade official in the ministry of taxation named Hong Suju (1669–1731); Chae Paengyun (1669–1731), a royal scribe; and Lee Don (1642–1713), a junior second grade official in the ministry of rites.

In light of the fact that the typical benefactors of Buddhist institutions during this period were poor farmers and women their patronage proved essential, and yet odd given that by the late 17th century the Old Doctrine faction had regained political dominance at court, fostering a renewed ostracism of Buddhism. Professor Lee Kang-geun argues that their support was part of the struggle over the royal succession. Since his birth, the Old Doctrine faction had secretly been supporting Yeoning as a possible rival to the son of Jang Okjeong, the royal consort who had for a time supplanted Queen Inhyeon (1667–1701). Indeed, the motives of Hwagyeong, who made the donation on behalf of her son, now appear to have been more political than religious; according to Choi Wansu it was likely an attempt to extend her influence and that of her supporters in the Jeolla region. Alternatively, Lee suggests that it might have been Inhyeon herself who was supporting the reconstruction on behalf of Hwagyeong and her son as an act of invocation for their future at court. (Note: The prince's name was incorrectly spelled on the sangnyangmun as Yeonin (延礽) instead of Yeoning (延礽). The error may have come about because his name and that of his mother appear to have been added to the document by monks at Hwaeomsa after it had already been written. See Choi 1994, p.55) Ultimately, the Old Doctrine faction would succeed in having Yeoning made crown prince in 1721, and he would later ascend the throne and rule as King Yeongjo (r.1724–1776).

The "ridge beam scroll" (sangnyangmun; 求禮華嚴寺丈六殿重建上樑文), a document which describes the circumstances of a major building's construction, was penned by Chae Paengyun and placed into the ridge beam during a ceremony in 1701. According to this document the hall was designed by a crew of 45 draftsmen led by master builder Neungo, a monk from the temple of Cheongwansa, in Jangheung. The assistant master builders were the monks Gakhe, who hailed from some unspecified temple on Mount Gyerongsan, and Wolwon, from Hongguksa, in Yeosu. These were some of the leading Buddhist architects of the southern provinces. A further contingent of about 3000 monks from the Righteous Monk Army was mobilized from the surrounding temples in South Jeolla Province and South Gyeongsang Province as manual labor, while about 150 monks from Hwaeomsa also had some direct or indirect involvement in the work. The eminent monk Muyong Suyeon (1651–1719), a disciple of Seongchong, also appears to have played a significant part in the hall's construction. (Note: At about the same time Muyong Suyeon was involved in the construction of a reliquary stupa at Tongdosa, which he wrote about in a document called To Felicitate the Construction of the Reliquary Stupa of Tongdosa, Yangsan, Gyeongsang-do and the Restoration of Jangnyukjeon Hall of Hwaeomsa, Gurye, Honam-do (慶尙道梁山通度寺聖骨靈塔及湖南求禮華嚴寺丈六重建慶讚疏). Sin Daehyeon claims that the role Suyeon played at Hwaeomsa was almost, if not equal in importance to that of Seongneung.) Construction of the hall was completed in 1702, for which seven altar statues were produced the following year and a week-long great dharma assembly held to commemorate their enshrinement. The building was renamed Gakhwangjeon Hall (Hall of the Enlightened Lord) after a new name table was sent from the capital. According to the inscription, it was produced in 1703 by Lee Jinhyu (1657–1710), a junior second grade official in the Ministry of Punishments. (Note: In 1705 Lee became a junior second grade official (champan) in the Ministry of Rites. An accomplished calligrapher, later examples of his work can be found on a monument adjoining the reliquary stupa at Tongdosa, and another at Seonamsa commemorating its repair.) The presence of the official's signature is a seen as a clear indication that Lee was ordered to write the name tablet by the royal court.

=== Renovations ===
Gakhwangjeon Hall was repaired in 1768 by Great Zen Master Jaun Cheogwan. The nature of the work is unknown but the names and duties of the workers have survived in the Hwaeomsa Chronicle. Also participating were monks, soldiers and villagers from the nearby temples of Cheongyesa and Yeongoksa, in Gurye county, as well as Gamnosa, in Namwon, the later one of the major patrons of the work. The building was repaired again in 1847 to replace rotted wood, broken roof tiles and wall paintings. This was followed by more work in 1851, 1860 (when new altar paintings were enshrined), and again in 1885.

The hall then underwent significant renovation in the Japanese colonial period, during which it was completely disassembled and then rebuilt. The only surviving accounts come from Gaijiro Fujishima (1899–2002), the Japanese architect who first proposed and was later appointed to lead the renovations. Gaijiro first visited Hwaeomsa in 1928, making two more visits during the same year to research and photograph the temple. He published his study in 1930, (Note: Published in 建築雑誌 (Journal of Architecture and Building Science) Vol. 44 No. 536, August 1930.) emphasizing the urgency of making repairs to Gakhwangjeon Hall, the roof of which was so badly damaged that it was letting in rain while several collapsed columns had also caused the building to lean over. After becoming abbot of Hwaeomsa, Jeong Byeongheon petitioned for and received financial support from the Government General to cover the substantial costs of the renovations, which would have otherwise been beyond the means of the temple. The renovations began in 1936, but as no report was ever published, the alterations made to the building have had to be deduced from surviving blueprints produced during the repairs as well as from photos taken immediately after the work was completed in May 1941.

The hall has been repaired several times since liberation. In 1961, repairs were made to the roof under the direction of Im Cheon (1908–1965), who had also participated in the restoration of the hall's wall paintings in 1939. More roof work was probably carried out in 1964. From 1966 to 1969, the building was restored again and a survey of the building was also carried out by the Bureau of Cultural Property. There was more roof work in 1983, while the altar was repaired in 1984. Another survey by the Bureau of Cultural Property, this time of all the temple buildings and stonework, was carried out from 1985 to 1986. In 2000 the roof was repaired again, as was the front staircase. A survey was conducted of Gakhwangjeon Hall from 2008 to 2009 by the Cultural Heritage Administration.

== Architecture ==
Gakhwangjeon Hall is the largest hall of Hwaeomsa, and overlooks the northwest end of the courtyard. However, although it is the temple's most prominent structure, the adjacent Daeungjeon Hall is the main hall.

=== Base ===
Gakhwangjeon Hall stands on the same granite base once used by Jangnyukjeon Hall, constructed in the post and lintel style (gagusikgidan) that was emblematic of late Unified Silla architecture. At a height of about 1 m (3.3 ft), its size is more comparable with Joseon palace architecture than contemporary Buddhist halls. The walls measure 30.9 m (101 ft) along the face and 22.48 m (73.8 ft) on the sides, their surfaces interrupted at regular intervals by post stones. Lintels are laid over top, forming nearly symmetrical eaves with the edges of the square slab stones the base rests on. The rectangular surface is covered in square inlaid blocks with a total area of 694 m^{2} (7,470 ft^{2}). There are forty round column bases set on square pedestals, each about 1 m (3.3 ft) across and carved from single pieces of granite. After centuries of sinking under the weight of the building, the heights of the column bases have come to vary widely. Traces of the groves that once held in place the stone plates inscribed with the Flower Garland Sutra are also visible on many of their sides. Four smaller square column bases are found at the corners of the building for the poles buttressing the eaves of the roof. The staircases at the center of the face and rear, as well as toward the front on the sides, each have six steps and triangular slabs which form the railings. A culvert runs around the rear and sides of the building.

The base underwent extensive restoration during the colonial-era. Many sections had to be replaced with new masonry, in part due to the fire damage sustained during the Imjin War as well as from centuries of accumulated decay. Prior to restoration, the basic shape of the facade had still been largely intact but the other three sides had lost nearly all form. Extant diagrams from the period indicate that the lintel stones were shattered while many of the walls had crumbled to pieces. Most of the square blocks presently covering the surface were also laid during this period, although they are known to have been part of the original design.

=== Structure ===
Gakhwangjeon Hall is two stories high, its wooden structure typical of late Joseon Buddhist architecture. The walls of the first floor are supported by twenty-four columns 4.2 m (14 ft) high, and measure 26.7 m (88 ft) along the length of the hall and 18.2 m (60 ft) along the sides. The second floor walls are 24.2 m (79 ft) by 15.9 m (52 ft) and made up of a further sixteen columns 10.4 m (34 ft) high that form a concentric rectangle surrounding the altar. The interior columns and the four central columns, which are 13.5 m (44 ft) high and positioned behind the altar, together support the roof of the second floor. Each of the columns were made from individual tree trunks, initially just stripped of their bark with the natural curvature largely left in. The outer columns and the upper part of the interior columns, though, were refashioned into more standard tapered columns during the colonial-era, and a few were replaced with new timber altogether.

The hall is seven bays across and five deep. The central bays are the widest and grow narrower toward the extremities to draw attention to the center of the building. The bay lengths are the same across both floors except for the outermost of the second floor, which are half the length of the lower floor. The exterior and interior columns are connected laterally at the heads with mortise and tenon joints, reinforced with thick lintels that rest on the tenons, and to each other by a series of crossbeams.

The extensive latticework installed between the columns allows light to flood the inner sanctuary and creates a more open environment than other contemporary structures. On the first floor, the three central bays of the facade have four-panel doors while the remainder have two-paneled doors. These doors open inwards and use the ornate gyeokjagyosal lattice—a combination of a vertical, horizontal and 45° diagonal lattice ribs—in the midsection, with a section of diagonal lattice (bitsalmun) above and a flat panel below. The use of gyeokjagyosal was exceptionally rare, earlier examples of which from the Joseon dynasty are found only at Geungnakjeon Hall of Muwisa and Daeungjeon Hall of Hongguksa. Outward opening door panels with comparatively modest belt-lattice (ddisalmun) occupy the first, third and fifth bays of the side walls and all but the outer-most bays of the rear wall, which have fixed wall panels of the same design instead. The mild degree of weathering seen in the side and rear doors compared to the front suggest that they were repaired or even replaced during the colonial-era. The spaces between the columns of the second floor have windows of vertical lattice (jeongjamun), the light passing through which illuminates the faces of the altar statues.

=== Inner sanctuary ===
The interior of the hall is a single open space of a size rarely seen at a Korean temple. The large wooden altar is named Sumidan after Mount Sumeru. Situated at the absolute center of the building, it occupies a space five bays long by one deep. Its three-tiered structure, with raised daises for altar statues, was widely used in the 17th and 18th centuries. Notably, the panels along the face and sides, which lack either painting or relief imagery, as well as the uncharacteristically simple borders, suggest that the altar was reconstructed along simpler lines during the colonial-era renovations. The absence of a canopy, however, is typical for halls of this size.

The coffered ceiling of recessed panels is flat directly above the altar (an area equivalent to three by one bays) but otherwise slanted downwards. The central columns, which stretch across the hall, form a wall behind the altar from which the altar paintings hang. The rear side is covered in mortuary tablets for the deceased, at the center of which is a statue of the Buddha Amithaba dating to the modern era. The central position of the wall and altar appear to sharply reduce the size of the worship space when compared to the relatively large area at the rear of the hall. Red fences with spiked tops (hongsalchaek) had originally been used to block passage from the rear to the interior of the hall but these were removed during the colonial-era. The inlaid blocks of the stone base were visible until they were covered with wooden flooring in 1998.

=== Roof ===
The two-tiered roof is gabled on the first floor and hipped on the second. Their double eaves appear to curl up at the edges, the exposed rafters spread evenly along the lengths and then fanning out at the corners (seonjayeon). The eight protruding corners are buttressed by poles that bend heavily under the weight. The ridge line is 24 m (79 ft) long, and the gables are 4.8 m (16 ft) high and 12.5 m (41 ft) across at their lowest points.

Underneath the eaves is a canopy of multiple interlocking brackets. A total of 120 bracket clusters distributed across both floors (64 above, 56 below) support a set of two purlins on the interior and exterior of the building. There is one cluster atop each column and two intercolumnar clusters per bay, but only one in the outer bays of the first floor and none on the second because of their shorter length. The canopy is clearly functional rather than decorative, especially when contrasted to the great size of the roof and the greater elaborateness typically seen in one-story structures. The design of the each cluster's four brackets are identical on the exterior: the lower two curve upwards (angseohyeong), the third downward (suseohyeong), while the fourth spirals into cloud-shaped crockets (ungonghyeong). However, on the inside there are eight varieties of the upper two brackets, varying in design according to their position within the hall. The elephant-shaped appearance of the upper bracket crockets was common to 17th-century Buddhist halls, but the lower two brackets have an almost quarter circle-like curvature unlike the more commonly seen bowed shaped.

The roof has been re-tiled multiple times since the renovations of the 1930s. The tiles on the upper tier are of the traditional Korean style (guwa), and include a combination of hand-made and machine-made tiles, several of which notably bear a stamp that reads "Repaired in the 12th and 13th year of Shōwa" (1937 to 1938); the lower tier has modern machine-made tiles only. The eaves alternate between crescent-shaped tiles (ammaksae) carved with double-headed dragons bisected by an inscription with their year of production (1967 or 1999), and circular tiles (sumaksae) with either a ten-leaf lotus flower or the syllable om in Sanskrit. Perched at the ends of the ridge line and the corners of the eaves are decorative tiles (mangwa) identical to the crescent-shaped eave tiles. The ones at the bottom of the gables, though dating to 1938, were modeled after the original tiles from 1700 and include the names of financial contributors to the roof work.

=== Adornments ===
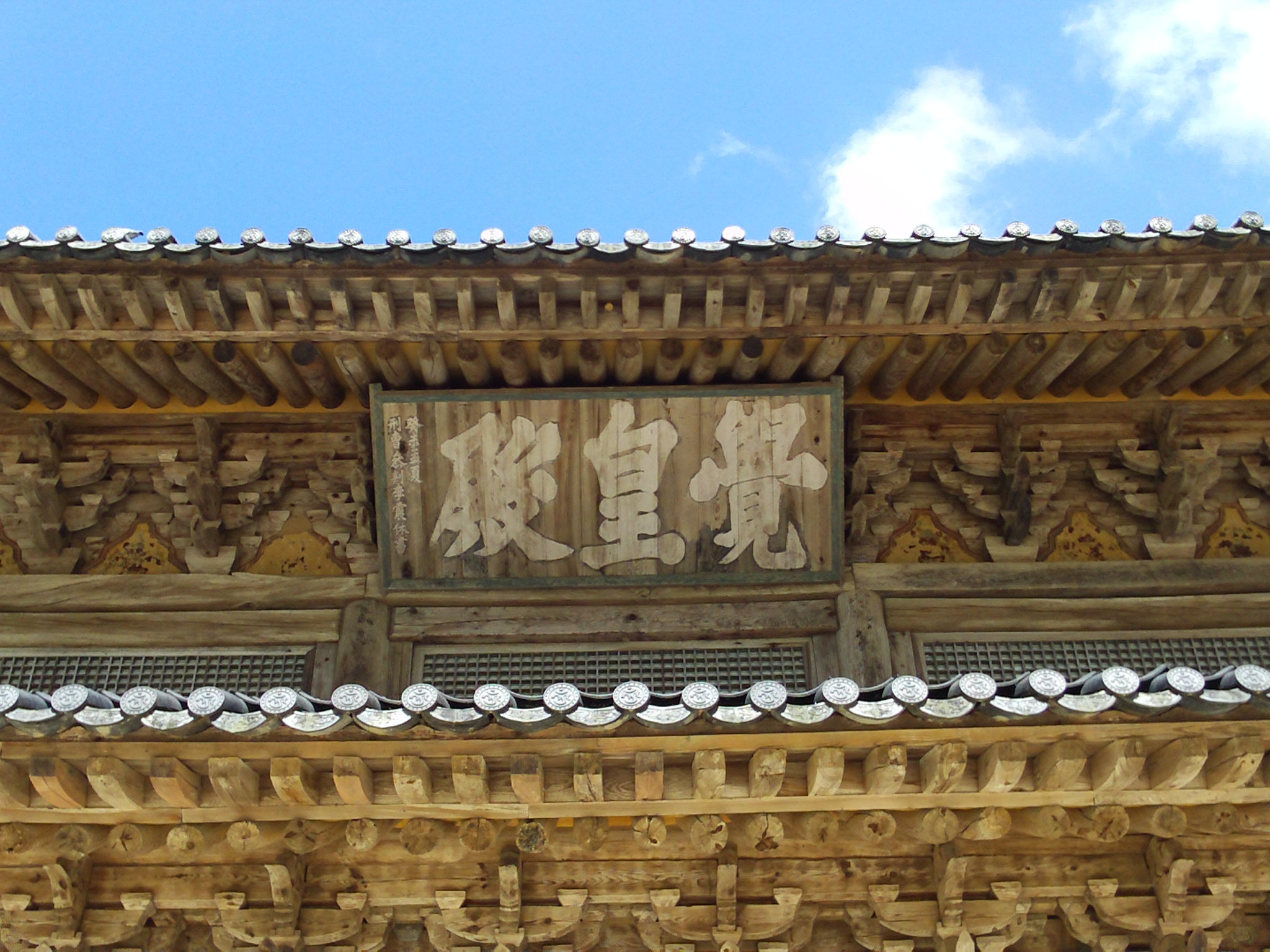
The name tablet of Gakhwangjeon Hall surrounded by the faded rafters and bracketing of the roof.

The name tablet of Gakhwangjeon Hall is affixed between the lintel and the rafters of the central bay on the second floor. Measuring 4 m (13 ft) across and 1.83 m (6.0 ft) tall, the tablet is composed of vertical planks of wood attached side by side and encased in a frame. Although the gold leaf that once adorned the background has faded completely bare, the writing itself still retains its white coloring.

Verse couplets (juryun) written onto eight tablets hang from each of the first floor columns at the front of the building. Such verses are usually related to the icons enshrined inside, but in the case of Gakhwangjeon Hall the first stanza of four lines describes the monk Yeongi, the founder of Hwaeomsa, and was borrowed from the writings of National Preceptor Uicheon (1055–1101); meanwhile the second stanza is of unknown origin.

From right side of the building to left they read:

1. 偉論雄經罔不通 Mastering both the Mahayana and the Avatamsaka,
2. 一生弘護有深功 His merits vast from a life of defending the dharma.
3. 三千義學分燈後 Having shared the light of the Buddha's teaching with his 3000 disciples,
4. 圓敎宗風滿海東 The precepts of the Avatamsaka have spread across the land.

5. 西來一燭傳三世 This one eastern light taught to the past, present and future,
6. 南國千年闡五宗 Over a thousand years diffusing from the south into the five schools.
7. 遊償此增淸淨債 For one to surpass such immaculate merits,
8. 白雲回首與誰同 It is as the head of a cloud turns, who could do the same? (Note: ｢기시론｣과 ｢화엄경｣을 통달하신 데다 일생 동안 호법하신 공도 크시네 삼천 제자에게 불법의 등불 나눠주니 화엄 원교의 종풍이 해동에 가득하네 서쪽에서 온 등불 하나 삼세에 전하니 남쪽에서 천 년 동안 오종으로 퍼져갔네 뉘라서 이 청정한 공을 보태어 갚으랴 흰 구름 머리 돌리니 누구와 더불어 함께 할까)

The year of their production is unknown but the signature indicates that the tablets were produced by Kim Yonggu (1907–1982), the same calligrapher who made the verse tablets for Daeungjeon Hall. The tablets are undecorated, measuring about 3.5 m (11 ft) in length and 0.4 m (1.3 ft) across.

Colonial-era wind bells hang from each of the eight protruding corners.

=== Dancheong ===
The dancheong, or decorative paintwork, of Gakhwangjeon Hall's exterior has almost completely worn away. The remnants around the bracketing, and photos from Record of Ancient Sites and Monuments in Korea, however, indicate that the building had originally been painted in the sophisticated geumdancheong style. The triangular-shaped wall paintings between the bracket clusters of the first floor are the largest visible sections, alternating between potted lotus flowers and peony blossoms. On the facade they are depicted in full bloom but on the side walls they can be seen growing smaller in size until towards the rear, where the lotuses are mere buds while the peonies appear as lilies of the valley. The considerable fading make it impossible to see the flowers' original coloring except for some spots of barely visible white, crimson and green, and the outlines of the flower pots. It appears as though the design of the rear differed entirely from the front, as evidenced by the three remaining paintings of the egret, depicted flying with great composure, wings completely extended, while their long and slender necks droop downwards and their legs are raised as if to take a step forward. The extant wall paintings on the second floor are exclusively lotus flowers.

The painted surfaces of the interior are in a relatively better state of preservation, revealing the hall to be a striking example of Jeolla-do regional dancheong, as well as representing a transition between 17th- and 18th-century styles. A diversity of ornate patterns making great use of green, salmon, and red ocher cover every surface of the beams and brackets. The ceiling panels are decorated with floral patterns of lotus flowers, peony blossoms, crimson four-leaf flowers (juhwa), and floating lotuses. The panels on the flat portion of the ceiling each display floral patterns against a background of red ocher while surrounded by arabesques of green, blue and salmon. On the slanted portion of the ceiling the panels feature a lotus flower surrounded by flowers and arabesques, or with a Chinese character written in each of its eight petals. The spaces between the purlins are decorated with cloud patterns (unmun) on an earth-yellow background and outlined in green.

Wall panels depicting the arhats line the upper floor, between each of which dragon faces have been painted. Some arhats appear to face outwards with backs bent over like a crescent-shaped moon, or gaze skywards with a gaping mouth and hands folded in behind the back. Others are seen standing upright, wielding a cintamani in one hand, or have their heads lowered and eyes closed, as if in silent meditation. Their colorless figures have been captured with simple but powerful brush strokes, while the trails of their robes almost appear to disappear as they flutter into the wind. The spaces between the bracket clusters each display a seated Buddha. Painted onto a background of red ocher, each figure has a nimbus while the curled hair has been rendered in a heavily exaggerated manner. A gem is visible in the topknot while the oval face displays a crimson urna on the forehead. Both hands are raised chest high with the trails of the robes draped over top.

Arhats are also painted onto many of the beams and walls of the lower floor, depicted by a stream under a green tree with a trunk colored brightly in red ocher, accompanied by a heavenly boy monk, dragon or tiger. Although drawn mostly in black ink against an earth-yellow background, the light coloring of the arhat's salmon skin, the tiger's white feet, and dragon's crimson tongue serve to accentuate the image. Visible elsewhere are images of apsaras carrying a janggu around the neck and a drumstick in the right hand, their heavenly robes fluttering in the wind as if descending from the heavens. The seated Buddhas among the brackets appear on lotus pedestals surrounded by nimbuses of the five cardinal colors; the urna is flesh-colored, while some images omit the topknot gem entirely. The hands are mainly seen in the Vajra or Dharmacakra mudrā, while some are positioned in the Bhumisparsha mudrā or with hands held chest-high.

Written across the central tenons above the front entrance are His Majesty the Sovereign (主上殿下), Her Royal Highness the Queen Consort (王妃殿下), and His Royal Highness the Prince Successor (世子邸下).

== Altar statues ==
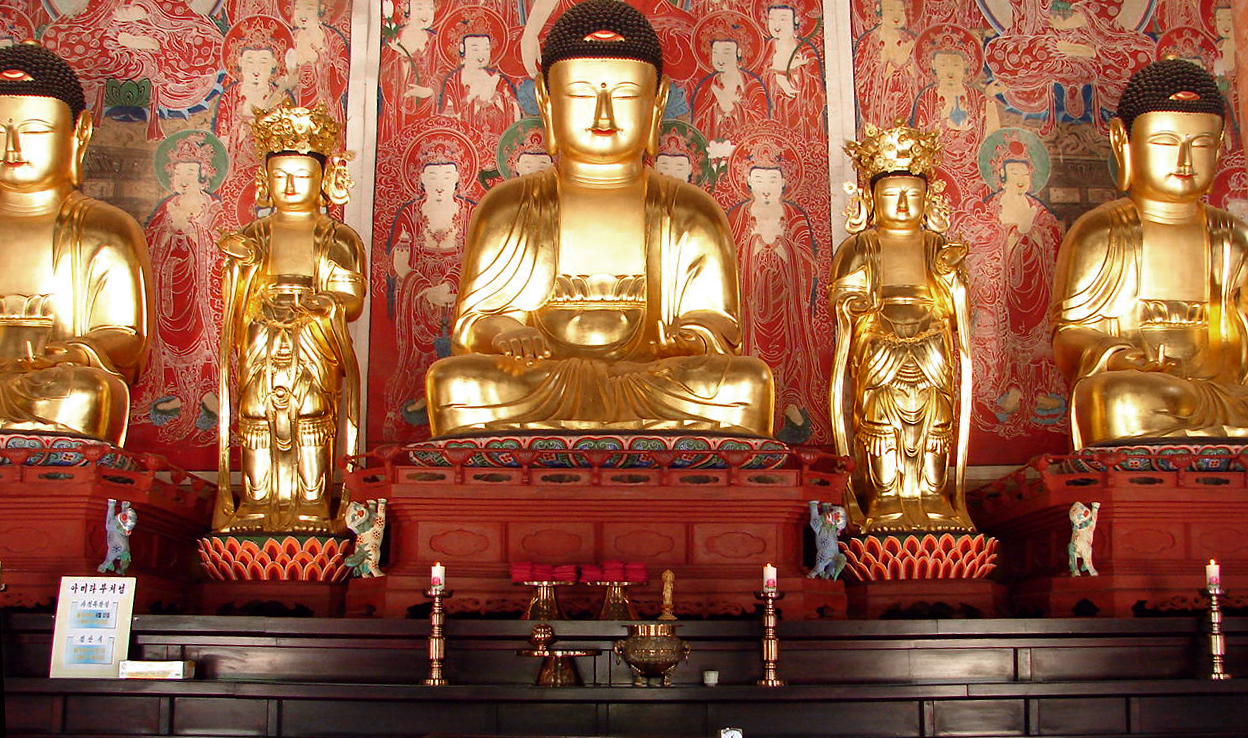
The Buddha Sakyamuni, attended by the Bodhisattvas Samantabhadra (left) and Manjusri (right), forming the Buddhas of the Three Periods with Prabhutaratna (far left) and Amitābha (far right).

Seven statues are enshrined on the altar of Gakhwangjeon Hall. The primary icons are a seated triad depicting the Buddhas of the Three Periods giving salvation to sentient beings across all time, with Sakyamuni as the Buddha of the present, Prabhutaratna as Buddha of the past, and Amitābha as Buddha of the future (not to be confused with the triad of Sakyamuni, Dīpankara and Maitreya in the Lotus Sutra). This unusual combination of Buddha statues is unique to Hwaeomsa, but was frequently featured in gwebuls from the province of Jeolla throughout the 18th century, including pieces from Naesosa (1700), Cheonggoksa (1722), Anguksa (1728), Unheungsa (1730), Dabosa (1745), and Gaeamsa (1749). The origin of the arrangement may not be scriptural, Buddhist scholar Oh Jinhee asserts, rather representing a visualization from The Collected Five Voices of the Brahma (五種梵音集) a ceremonial book first published in 1661 used to wish the dead a peaceful afterlife. Its preface was written by Byeogam Gakseong, suggesting a role in the selection of icons decades before their realization. Four Bodhisattvas stand interspaced between the Buddhas. Viewing left to right, they are Avalokiteśvara, the Bodhisattva of compassion; Samantabhadra, the Bodhisattva of meditation; Manjusri, the Bodhisattva of wisdom; and Ksitigarbha, the Bodhisattva of hell.

To produce the icons, contributions of money, paddy fields, and grain were provided by eleven monks, seven laymen and one court lady. They were executed by a guild of twenty-three monks led by the influential sculptor Saengnan, from the temple of Neungasa, in Goheung County. (Note: Saengnan may have begun sculpting as early as the 1660s, and was probably in his 50s or 60s when he produced the altar statues for Gakhwangjeon Hall. Other extant examples of his work can be found at Jeongsusa (1684), Cheoneunsa (1693), Ssangbongsa (1694), the hermitage of Chukseongam (1700), as well as the hermitage of Seongdoam.) The other primary sculptors were Chungok, Ilgi, Eungwon, Chupyeong, and Chubung, of whom the later three were probably Saengnan's most gifted disciples, having worked under him for about twenty years. Saengnan personally sculpted the statue of Sakyamuni and worked with Chubung to produce Avalokiteśvara, both pieces representing his finest work. Prabhutaratna and Manjusri were sculpted by Chungok, a monk from Songgwangsa who was working with Saengnan for the first time, but about whom little else is known. Amitabha was produced by Ilgi, of Naesosa, Samantabhadra by Eungwon, and Ksitigarbha by Chupyeong.

=== Buddhas ===
The Buddha statues were crafted to appear colossal in size so as to overwhelm worshipers. Sakyamuni, the largest of the three, is 3.5 m (11 ft) high and 2.5 m (8.2 ft) wide at the knees. Seated in the lotus position, the Buddha's upper body has rounded shoulders and a wide chest, while his hands are in the bhumisparsha mudrā. Characteristically, the size of the head is large compared to the body. The face appears flat and square in shape but the curvature in the chin and cheeks, as well as the soft smile formed from its thin lips, give the icon a genial countenance. The facial features, especially the prominent nose between the statue's long, half-open eyes are an example of a style that first became prevalent with the Trikaya statues of Sinheungsa in 1651. There is an urna visible between the eyebrows, as well as an ushnisha, denoted by the hair cropped in small spiral curls, and a half-moon shaped jewel (gyeju) protruding just above the forehead. The robes drape over the left shoulder only, wrapping around the front in a U-shape, leaving the statue exposed from the chest to the upper waist. The waistcoat is creased into the shape of five lotus petals, and the ends of the robes trail off over the left knee in the shape of a lotus bud.

The slightly smaller statues of Prabhutaratna and Amitābha closely resemble Sakyamuni, in addition to forming near mirror images of each other. Each is depicted with their hands in a variation of the vitarka mudrā, whereby the thumb and the middle finger touch while the remaining fingers are extended. In the case of Prabhutaratna, the left hand is raised while the right rests lightly over the knee, while on Amitābha this is reversed. Just above the legs there are two folds in the robes of Prabhutaratna compared to three for Amitābha, an example of the greater simplicity typically found in the attendant to the right in sculpture from this period. The two figures stand 3.2 m (10 ft) high and 2 m (6.6 ft) wide.

=== Bodhisattvas ===
The statues of Manjusri and Samantabhadra are to the direct left and right, respectively, of Sakyamuni. Towards the extremities of the altar, Avalokiteśvara is to the right of Amitābha and Ksitigarbha to the left of Prabhutaratna. The mudras of the figures are symmetrical across the altar: on the right side, the hands of Samantabhadra and Avalokiteśvara are positioned the same as Amitābha; while on the opposite side, those of Ksitigarbha and Manjusri match Prabhutaratna. Each Bodhisattva stands 3 m (9.8 ft) high and 70 cm (28 in) across at the shoulders.

Despite the difference in their postures, the overall physical presentation and sculptural technique displayed by the Bodhisattvas are identical to that of the Buddha statues. The faces, in particular, have the same half-open eyes, protruding nose and thin lips characteristic of late 17th-century Buddhist sculpture. But in contrast to the relative simplicity of the seated Buddhas, the standing Bodhisattva statues are highly ornate, especially in their elaborate crowns and drapery.

The crown is positioned high atop the topknot from which billowing flames appear to be pouring down each side of the head. The upper section is adorned with five flame ornaments surrounding a small flower at the center, inside which are two birds who sit facing each other. A ten-leaf lotus flower surrounded by flames adorns the lower half of the crown along with several five-petaled flowers, while to each side sits a fenghuang on a finely sculpted cloud. From underneath the crown, a strand of the Bodhisattva's minutely depicted hair can be seen twisting and meandering down each side of the head.

The drapery of Manjusri and Samantabhadra is largely identical. Their robes display an elaborate array of folds and creases that resemble lotus flowers around the waist and serrated blades of grass near the knees. The outer cloaks are rendered in the style of celestial garments, draped over both shoulders and flowing downward to the feet. Wide belts are wrapped around each figure's waist, the ends of which are tied in knots and flow down between the legs, twisting together at the feet. Unlike Manjusri, though, Samantha's belt is sumptuously decorated with flowers.

The drapery of Ksitigarbha and Avalokiteśvara is also identical. Their outer cloaks resemble those worn by monks, covering both of Ksitigarbha's shoulders but only the right of Avalokiteśvara. Shaped like a crescent on the right side, the cloaks are folded at the elbows and flow downward toward the feet. A waistcoat is worn over their robes, which are decoratively folded below the waist in what appears to be the shape of a letter U veering slightly to the right. The hems at the bottom are pointed like the trailing end of a bird's wing.

== Altar paintings ==
Three altar paintings depicting the Buddhas of the Three Periods (samsebulhoedo) were executed in 1860 by the monks Haeun, Punggok, Seoun, Cheoru, Wolheo, Haemyeong and Seoam. The artists, though, mistook Prabhutaratna for Bhaisajyaguru, the Buddha of healing and medicine, who is depicted in the altar painting to the left. The true identity of the altar statue only became evident when the "chest concealed record" (bokjanggi; 佛像服藏記) was retrieved from inside one of the statues in 1975. Although it is unknown how the statue's identity came to be forgotten, Hwang Hogyun suggests that the change to Bhaisajyaguru may simply reflect a development in belief structure that occurred over the 150 years separating the production of the statues and the paintings.

Each piece is largely identical in style and structure, with a seated Buddha surrounded by over twenty attendants arranged symmetrically in three rows that span the width of the canvas. The figures are painted in gold onto red silk (hongtaenghwa), each of the canvases made from attaching together eleven separate lengths of silk side by side. The delicate brush strokes and the effective use of contrasting color compensate in vividness for the size and uniformity of the paintings. The attendants decrease in size while the brightness of their skin increases from the bottom to the top of the paintings, adding perspective and creating a visual synergy characteristic of Joseon-era Buddhist art. They are in an excellent state of preservation except for some slight peeling along the edges, and are described by the Cultural Heritage Administration as "having significant historical value for their display of the main characteristics of Joseon Buddhist art."

On the wall to the left of the altar is a painting of the assembly of guardian deities (sinjungtaenghwa), executed in 1965 by Kim Uil (1901–1998), the best pupil of the Buddhist artist Kim Ilseop (1901–1975). On the opposite side of the hall are portraits of Zen Master Reesandan Dogwang (1937–1984) and Patriarch Dongheondang Wongyu (1896–1983).

=== Sakyamuni ===
Sakyamuni is enshrined on a lotus throne high atop an altar of Sumeru colored in wood grain and highly detailed. He is seated right leg over left in the lotus position at the center of the painting, his hands in the bhumisparsha mudra and the right shoulder left bare. His crimson robes display elaborate drapery, the folds emphasized with steely, yet buoyant lines. The cross striped hems of the garment are decorated in a pattern of scattered flowers outlined in gold. The spirals in Sakyamuni's conch shaped hair are minutely detailed, and auspicious beams of light ascend towards the heavens from his crimson colored ushnisha. The facial features are perfectly centered on his large face, which, like the bare arms and chest, are painted in a light yellowish-white hue. His large nose protrudes out from between the small eyes and thin eyebrows, while the red lips create an appearance of benevolence. Comparatively small for his size, the oval shaped nimbus surrounding Sakyamuni's body and head is green, outlined in seven different colors and golden flames.

An assembly of twenty-eight deities surrounds the Buddha. At the forefront, making up the first row, are the Four Great Bodhisattvas Avalokiteśvara, Manjusri, Samantabhadra and Mahāsthāmaprāpta. The halos of Manjusri and Samantabhadra are green and outlined in gold, in contrast to those of Avalokiteśvara and Mahāsthāmaprāpta, which are done in gold only. Avalokiteśvara is holding a blue kundika, Manjusri a lotus bud, Samantabhadra a cintamani, while the hands of Mahāsthāmaprāpta are clasped together. Pedestals of blue lotus flowers can be seen beneath their feet. In the second row, Sakyamuni is flanked by the Buddhas Vipaśyīn Buddha and Śikhīn Buddha (seen near Sakyamuni's head), below whom are the Eight Great Bodhisattvas arranged symmetrically in groups of four. They are depicted slightly smaller than the Bodhisattvas of the front row, and with brighter skin. Maitreya, Vajragarbha, Bhaisajyaraja and Mahêśvara are on the left side while Dīpankara, Sarvanivarana-Vishkambhin, Bhaiṣajyasamudgata and Śakra are on the right. The bodies, robes, crowns, and halos are outlined in gold against the red background, while the hair is cobalt blue. At the rear of the assembly, the third row is made up of the ten principal disciples, a pair of heavenly boy monks and another pair of apsaras. Except for their black hair and exposed flesh of their faces and hands, these figures are red and outlined in gold. The canvas measures 6.75 m (22.1 ft) by 3.945 m (12.94 ft).

=== Bhaisajyaguru ===
The painting of Bhaisajyaguru is substantially the same as Sakyamuni in composition and color tone. The Buddha is enthroned on a lotus throne atop a wood grain colored altar of Sumidan, seated in the lotus position underneath a white lotus canopy. Like the statue of Prabhutaratna before him, Bhaisajyaguru's hands are in the vitarka mudrā, with the thumb and middle finger touching while the remaining fingers are extended, the left hand raised while the right rests on the leg. A medicine box is held in the left hand, the lower half decorated in a fret and the upper half colored green. The facial features match Sakyamuni, but the head and ushinisha have been rendered in lama style, from which auspicious beams of light stream out in three directions. Although the body is well-proportioned overall, the breadth of the knees appear small compared to the torso, in addition to being much smaller than the lower body of Sakyamuni. The Buddha's red robes display a rope curtain pattern of yellowish-white with a band of flowers and serrated half-circles embroidered along the ends. They are draped over the right shoulder, while an overcoat covers the left shoulder and has been lightly thrown over the right shoulder. The body is surrounded by a circular nimbus of cobalt blue and the head in a halo of green, both outlined in the five cardinal colors.

An assembly of twenty-two deities surrounds Bhaisajyaguru. Standing in the first row are the Bodhisattvas Suryaprabha and Candraprabha, flanked, respectively, by the Heavenly Kings of the south and west, Virūḍhaka and Virūpākṣa. The second row is made up of the Bodhisattvas Maitreya, Manjusri, and Vajragarbha on the right side of Bhaisajyaguru, while Avalokiteśvara, Samantabhadra, and Sarvanivarana-Vishkambhin are on the left. In the third row, to the right of the Buddha's nimbus, are the Buddha Viśvabhū, a Snake spirit general, and a heavenly boy-monk, while to the left are the Buddha Krakucchanda, another serpent spirit general, and an apsara. Like the painting of Sakyamuni, the size of the attendants grow smaller towards the rear and their skin color grows white. In addition, the skin color of Bhaisajyaguru and the eight Bodhisattvas surrounding him has been brightened to a yellowish-white hue, focusing the attention of the viewer on the center of the painting. The various attendants' bodies, robes and crowns are painted with strong steely lines, while items like the vajra and jeweled sword are brightly painted in white-ultramarine to add contrasting color. The canvas measures 6.62 m (21.7 ft) by 4 m (13 ft).

=== Amitābha ===
The painting of Amitābha appears symmetrical to that of Bhaisajyaguru. Its composition and form, patterns and coloring are identical, as are the shape of the face and mudra. However, while the drapery is also the same, unlike Bhaisajyaguru the fluttering sleeve of Amitābha's right arm leaves the skin exposed from below the elbow. This is meant to distinguish the different roles of the two Buddhas.

An assembly of twenty-two deities surrounds Amitābha. The facial expressions of the four deities in the first row are depicted with great joy. To the left are the Bodhisattva Cundi and the Heavenly King Dhṛtarāṣṭra playing a musical instrument, while to the right are Mahāsthāmaprāpta and the Heavenly King Vaiśravaṇa holding both a pagoda and a floral pennant. Six Bodhisattvas surround Bhaisajyaguru in the second row: the three to the left are probably Maitreya, Manjusri and Sarvanivarana-Vishkambhin, while those to the right are Ksitigarbha, Samantabhadra and Vajragarbha. In the third row, Amitābha is flanked, respectively, by the Buddhas of the past Kanakamuni and Kassapa (visible by Amitābha's halo), behind whom are Sariputta, Subhuti, Hogyedaesin, Yama, Sarasvati towards the left, while Ananda, Bokdeokdaesin, the Dragon King Sagara, and Lakshmi are to the right (one figure has yet to be unidentified). At the very top, devas flank the white lotus canopy. The canvas measures 6.7 m (22 ft) by 4 m (13 ft).

=== Assembly of Guardian Deities ===
The figures making up the assembly of guardian deities are arranged into four rows spread across the painting. At the center of the first row is Skanda, the Bodhisattva of the Protection of Buddhist Doctrine. To the left are Saraswati, Hogyedaesin, Vaisravana and Dhrtarastra, and to the right are Lakshmi, Bokdeokdaesin, Vaiśravaṇa and Virūpākṣa. On the left side of the second row are Tojisin, Garamsin, Panchika, Munhosin, the Water-ruling spirit, and Bangwisin; while to the right side are Doryangsin, Oktaeksin, Mahogara, Juhwasin, and Sijiksin. In the center of the third row is an Asura, to whose left are Sikhin, Jusansin, a kinnara, and Sūrya, and to whose right are Śakra, Garuda, Jujosin, and Candra. The fourth row is composed of ten apsaras and heavenly boy monks. The canvas measures 2.07 m (6.8 ft) by 3.36 m (11.0 ft).

== Legacy ==
Gakhwangjeon Hall is an outstanding example of Joseon dynasty Buddhist architecture, and was designated National Treasure 67 in 1962. It is one of only four extant multi-story Buddhist halls dating to the 17th century; its contemporaries including Daeungbojeon Hall (1618) and Palsangjeon Hall (1626) of Beopjusa, as well as Mireukjeon Hall (1635) of Geumsansa. Of these, Gakhwangjeon Hall most closely resembles Daeungbojeon Hall, the two halls being of the same size with nearly identical interiors. Examples of structures with seven-by-five bay dimensions are also exceedingly rare, Gakhwangjeon Hall being the sole to have been built during the late Joseon period.
