= June 3 Resistance movement =

1964 protests in South Korea

- Date: 3 June 1964
- Location: South Korea
- Caused by: Negotiation of normalization of Japan–South Korea relations
- Goals: Anti Treaty on Basic Relations between Korea and Japan
- Methods: Protest marches and civil disobedience
- Result: President Park Chung-hee invokes Martial law and the protesters was suppressed.: Normalization of South Korea-Japan relations through Treaty on Basic Relations between Japan and the Republic of Korea in 1965.

Parties
South Korean government	protesters

Lead figures
Park Chung Hee	no centralized leadership

The June 3 resistance movement, also known as 6.3 resistance or the movement against the Korea-Japan negotiations (Korean: 한일협상 반대 운동, 6.3시위 or 6.3 항쟁) was initiated in June 1964 by students and citizens against the Park Chung Hee administration's effort to negotiate the normalization of Japan–South Korea relations.

In 1964, President Park Chung Hee secretly pushed for the Treaty on Basic Relations between Japan and the Republic of Korea to normalize diplomatic relations with Japan, which had been severed since 1945 with the aim of revitalizing the economy of South Korea. 6.3 resistance against Treaty on Basic Relations between Japan and the Republic of Korea were initiated in June 1964 by college students, ordinary citizens and non-government figures in opposition to the Park Chung Hee administration. On 3 June 1964, the Park Chung Hee administration declared martial law to suppress protests against a summit between South Korea and Japan. The martial law declared at 10 p.m. on 3 June was terminated on 29 July. In the end, however, the government decided to agree with the Japanese government to push for normalization of South Korean-Japanese relations through the foreign ministers of South Korea and Japan in Tokyo.

== Background ==
In 1964, the South Korean government began to secretly push for negotiations between South Korea and Japan and try to reach a conclusion. Soon after, Tokyo rushed to negotiate political negotiations, and by February, the government and the ruling party announced their decision to go ahead with the basic course of negotiations with Japan in March. On 22 February 1964, the Democratic Party of Korea announced an alternative plan for negotiations between South Korea and Japan, which was confirmed by the party platform. Ignoring the trend of general public opinion, the Park Chung Hee administration was determined to give up the "Syngman Rhee Line (Peace Line)," a lifeline for South Korean fishermen, to Japan, satisfied with the $300 million claim compensation. As the Park Chung Hee administration rushed to negotiate with Japan, opposition parties agreed on the need for an uprising and began preparatory work.

In March 1964, the government announced the schedule for negotiations between South Korea and Japan. On 6 March, 200 prominent figures, including representatives from all opposition parties and social, religious and cultural organizations, formed the "National Committee for the Combat Against Japan Indignity Diplomacy." On 9 March, non-covernment figures and various politicals gathered at the Jongno Wedding Hall in Seoul to adopt salvation of the Nation and promise to have general rally. Yun Posun, who was in charge of the fight committee chairman, read the declaration.

== Development ==
=== Seoul National University's hunger strike ===
On 24 March 1964, liberal arts students of Seoul National University began a hunger strike by holding a ceremony to burn Japanese flags and a ceremony to burn a figure named Kim Jong-pil, who joined the normalization of South Korea and Japan with Park Chung Hee. At this time, they were simply suppressed, but the students regrouped and held a funeral for "national democracy" on 20 May. This is because the name used during the Park Chung Hee administration was "national democracy." Kim Deog-ryong, then the student leader of Seoul National University, began a hunger strike by reading the declaration, and Yun Posun visited Seoul National University to encourage him.

=== The participation of students from other universities ===
Seoul National University's hunger strike irritated other students. Each college student in downtown Seoul took to the streets and began protesting, shouting for the overthrow of the Park Chung Hee administration. As students from Korea University, Chung-Ang University, Yonsei University, Seoul National University Law School and Seoul National University took the lead in demonstrations on June 2, student activists in Seoul responded and protested in various places. Students staged street rallies as of noon on June 3 as Republican Chairman Kim Jong-pil traveled to Japan for a summit on normalizing diplomatic ties between South Korea and Japan in early June.

In other universities, students with anti-Japanese consciousness started to fight against Japan by burning Flag of Japan and Prime Minister of Japan scarecrows. At that time, Seoul National University's Nationalist Comparison Research Society played a leading role, and it was possible because there was a communication network of activist students nationwide. The protests spread beyond hunger strikes to street protests, and college students, citizens and opposition parties took to the streets carrying the national flag, shouting, "The pro-Japanese Park Chung-hee regime should withdraw its diplomatic normalization with Japan," "Shame on you after 20 years of liberation," and "Stop the government that ignores the people."

=== Street demonstration ===
At noon on 3 June, 12,000 students in Seoul poured into the streets and went downtown, colliding with police everywhere. As seven to eight thousand university students flocked to the central office, the Sejongno area was thrown into disorder and chaos. The barricade in front of the central office has already collapsed and police have built a cordon in front of Tongui-dong, which goes up to Blue House. Students from Seoul National University left the school around 4 p.m. Some students were exhausted while walking, and exhausted students began to protest with stretchers. They arrived in front of the central government building with applause from demonstrators and citizens. They also stood at the head of the demonstration team and withdrew to school in the face of a police tear gas attack. The protest was the start of the June resistance movement. Korea university president of the student body Kim Jae-Ha is appointed to 6.3 resistance movement chairperson, Park Jung-Hoon and Lee Myung-bak helped him. Some 15,000 people and 15,000 others from 18 universities in Seoul flocked to the streets to stage violent protests and even occupy then Korea National Assembly Proceeding Building.

== Result ==
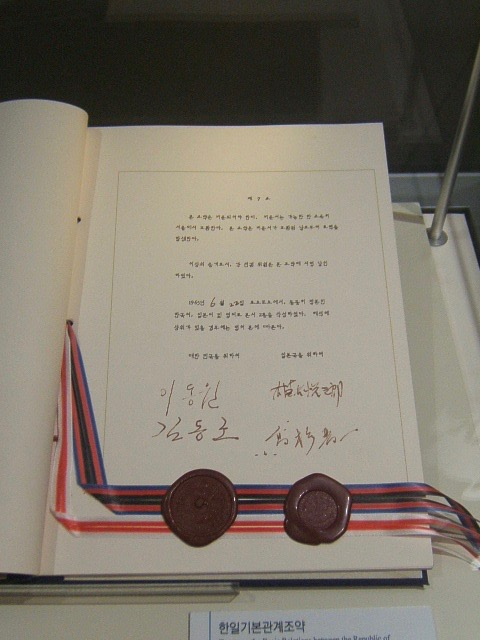
A copy of Treaty on Basic Relations between Japan and the Republic of Korea

=== The proclamation of martial law ===
As student demonstrations became violent, the Park Chung Hee administration declared martial law throughout the city on 3 June at 6:30 local time. The government dispatched police to crack down the demonstrators. And with the declaration of martial law, the government ordered a ban and crackdown on media censorship and university closures. This led to 1,120 arrests of students, politicians and journalists who led the protests at the time. Lee Myung-bak, Lee Jae-oh, Sohn Hak-kyu and 348 people served six months in the Seodaemun Prison due to rebellion and sedition. Park Chung Hee issued a statement to the nation, appealing for the need to normalize diplomatic relations with Japan as the uprising intensified. Protests were suppressed on 28 July and martial law was lifted the next day on 29 July.

=== Treaty on Basic Relations ===
Since then, the Park Chung Hee administration has continued consultations between South Korea and Japan, and in December 1965 South Korea and Japan finally agreed to normalize diplomatic relations through Treaty on Basic Relations between Japan and the Republic of Korea, resulting in the restoration of diplomatic relations 20 years after National Liberation Day of Korea.

The main contents of the Treaty on Basic Relations between South Korea and Japan "Confirm that all treaties and agreements signed between the Korean Empire and Empire of Japan before 22 August 1910, are already invalid. Article 2 and "We confirm that the Republic of Korea government is the only legitimate government on the Korean Peninsula." In Article 2, the English version of "already invalid" is described as "already null and void," on which the two countries' interpretations of it differ. South Korea says the annexation itself is illegal, while Japan claims the annexation treaty was legal but was nullified as of the time of liberation. Article 3 and Article 4 which recognize bilateral diplomatic relations.

== Major participants ==
- Yun Posun
- Chang Taek-sang
- Lee Myung-bak
- Lee Jae-oh
- Sohn Hak-kyu
- Choi Jang-jip
- Kim Chi-ha
- Ham Seok-heon
- Kim Deog-ryong
- Kim Hong-il
- Kim Young-sam
- Chang Chun-ha
- Lee Beom-seok
- Kang Won-yong
