= Ch'angŭigung =

Former palace in Seoul, Korea

Ch'angŭigung (Korean: 창의궁; Hanja: 彰義宮) was a Joseon-era detached palace (별궁; 別宮) or lesser royal residence in Seoul, Joseon. It was located in what is now Tongui-dong. It originally began as the residence of Chŏng Chehyŏn (정제현; 鄭齊賢), the husband of Princess Sukhwi (the fourth daughter of King Hyojong). The residence was purchased by King Sukjong (r. 1674–1720) and given to Sukjong's son, the future King Yeongjo. Crown Prince Hyojang was born here in 1719 (Korean calendar). In 1754, a shrine for the deceased Crown Prince Uiso called Ŭisomyo (의소묘; 懿昭廟) was constructed in the palace. In the 3rd month of 1866, a portion of the estate was demolished and its materials recycled for the reconstruction of the palace Gyeongbokgung; facilities were established in the palace for processing materials for the reconstruction. A fires broke out in Ch'angŭigung in the 12th month of 1866 and the 11th month of 1867. In 1868, a shrine from another lesser palace Yŏnhogung (연호궁; 延祜宮) was moved into Ch'angŭigung. In 1870, a shrine for Crown Prince Munhyo was moved into the palace. In 1900, the shrines were moved outside of the palace, to the building Yŏnghŭijŏn. In the 7th month of 1908, the palace was closed and turned into a residential area.
