= Ch'oe Hyowŏn =

Joseon Korean military officer

- Hangul: 최효원
- Hanja: 崔孝元
- RR: Choe Hyowon
- MR: Ch'oe Hyowŏn

Courtesy name
- Hangul: 의경
- Hanja: 義敬
- RR: Uigyeong
- MR: Ŭigyŏng

Ch'oe Hyowŏn (Korean: 최효원; Hanja: 崔孝元; 20/23 February 1638 – 15 August 1672), of the Haeju Choe clan (해주 최씨; 海州 崔氏), was a Joseon military officer. He was the father of Royal Noble Consort Suk and the maternal grandfather of King Yeongjo of Joseon.

== Biography ==
There is little detailed information known about his family lineage. The names of his great-grandfather Ch'oe Ŏkji, grandfather T'ongjŏng Ch'oe Malchŏng, and father Ch'oe T'aeil are mentioned. However, none of them are documented in the family records of the Haeju Choe clan. It remains uncertain whether they are descendants of Ch'oe On (崔溫), the founder of the Haeju Choe clan, several generations down the line.

His father Ch'oe Tae-il (최태일) held no official position, but posthumously, he was appointed to the positions of Sukjongdaebu (숭정대부; Grand Chancellor), Uijeongbu Jwachanseong (의정부좌찬성; State Councilor), concurrently positions of Panuigeumbusa (판의금부사; Inspector General of the Treasury), and was posthumously promoted again to the positions of Daegwangbo Sukrokdaebu (대광보국숭록대부; Grand Chancellor), Uijeongbu Uiejeong (의정부우의정; State Councilor), concurrently serving as Yeonggyeongyeon (영경연; Inspector General) and Ch'unch'ugwansa (춘추관사; Royal Secretariat). His mother, Lady Pyeonggang Jang (평강장씨), the daughter of Tongdeoknang Jang Ji-won (통덕랑 장지원), was posthumously recognized as Jeonggyeongbuin (정경부인). He was married to Hong Gye-nam's daughter, Lady Hong, from the Namyang Hong clan. They had two daughters and one son. Their second daughter eventually became the birth mother of Yi Geum, King Yeongjo. During his lifetime, Ch'oe Hyowŏn served as the General of the Vanguard (선략장군 (宣略將軍), acting Deputy Chief Officer of the Loyal Martial Guard.

He died on 15 August 1672, at the age of 35. After his death, his grandson, King Yeongjo, posthumously promoted him the position of Daewangbo (대광보국숭록대부; Grand Chancellor), Sukrokdaebu (숙록대부; State Councilor), concurrently holding the positions of Yŏngŭijŏng (Chief State Councillor), Yeonggyeongyeon (Inspector General), and Hongmungwan (Royal Secretariat) on February 18, 1734.

== Tombs ==
His burial site is located at 85th spot in Jin Gwan-dong, Eunpyeong District, Seoul. In the vicinity of his tomb, there are burial sites for his grandson Ch'oe Su-gang, father-in-law Hong Gye-nam, and the Hong Gye-ung family. The burial sites of his father, Ch'oe T'aeil, and grandfather, Ch'oe Malchŏng, are situated at 10-1 spot in Bulkwang-dong, Eunpyeong District. The epitaph was composed by the royal family member, Prince Seopyeonggun Lee Yo-ga.

== Family ==
- Father: Ch'oe T'aeil (최태일; 崔泰逸)
  - Grandfather: Ch'oe Malchŏng (최말정; 崔末貞)
    - Great-grandfather: Ch'oe Ŏkji (최억지; 崔億之)
- Mother: Lady Chang of the Pyeonggang Jang clan (평강 장씨; 平康 張氏)
  - Grandfather: Chang Wŏn (장원; 張遠)
- Wife
  - Lady Hong of the Namyang Hong clan (남양 홍씨; 南陽 洪氏; 17 October 1639 – 18 December 1673)
  - Daughter: Lady Ch'oe of the Haeju Choe clan (부인 최씨; 海州 崔氏)
  - Daughter: Royal Noble Consort Suk (숙빈 최씨; 淑嬪 崔氏; 17 December 1670 – 9 April 1718)
    - Son-in-law: Yi Sun, King Sukjong of Joseon (조선 숙종 이순; 朝鮮 肅宗 李焞)
      - Grandson: Prince Yŏngsu (영수군)
      - Grandson: Yi Geum, King Yeongjo of Joseon (조선 영조 이금; 朝鮮 英祖 李昑)
  - Son: Ch'oe Hu (최후; 崔垕)

== In popular culture ==
- Portrayed by Lee Hee-do in the 1988 MBC TV series 500 Years of Joseon: Queen In Hyun.
- Portrayed by Kang Man-hee in the 2002–3 KBS2 TV series Royal Story: Jang Hui-bin.
- Portrayed by Chun Ho-jin in the 2010 MBC TV series Dong Yi.
