= Tongui-dong =

- View of the Tongui-dong White Pine and surrounding neighborhood during the Japanese colonial period
- Interactive map of Tongui-dong
- Country: South Korea

Area
  - Total: 0.06 km^{2} (0.023 sq mi)

Korean name
- Hangul: 통의동
- Hanja: 通義洞
- RR: Tongui-dong
- MR: T'ongŭi-dong

Tongui-dong (Korean: 통의동) is a dong (neighbourhood) of Jongno District, Seoul, South Korea. It is a legal dong (법정동) administered under its administrative dong (행정동), Sajik-dong.

== See also ==
- Administrative divisions of South Korea
