= Hwaeomsa =

Jogye Buddhist temple in South Korea

- 화엄사
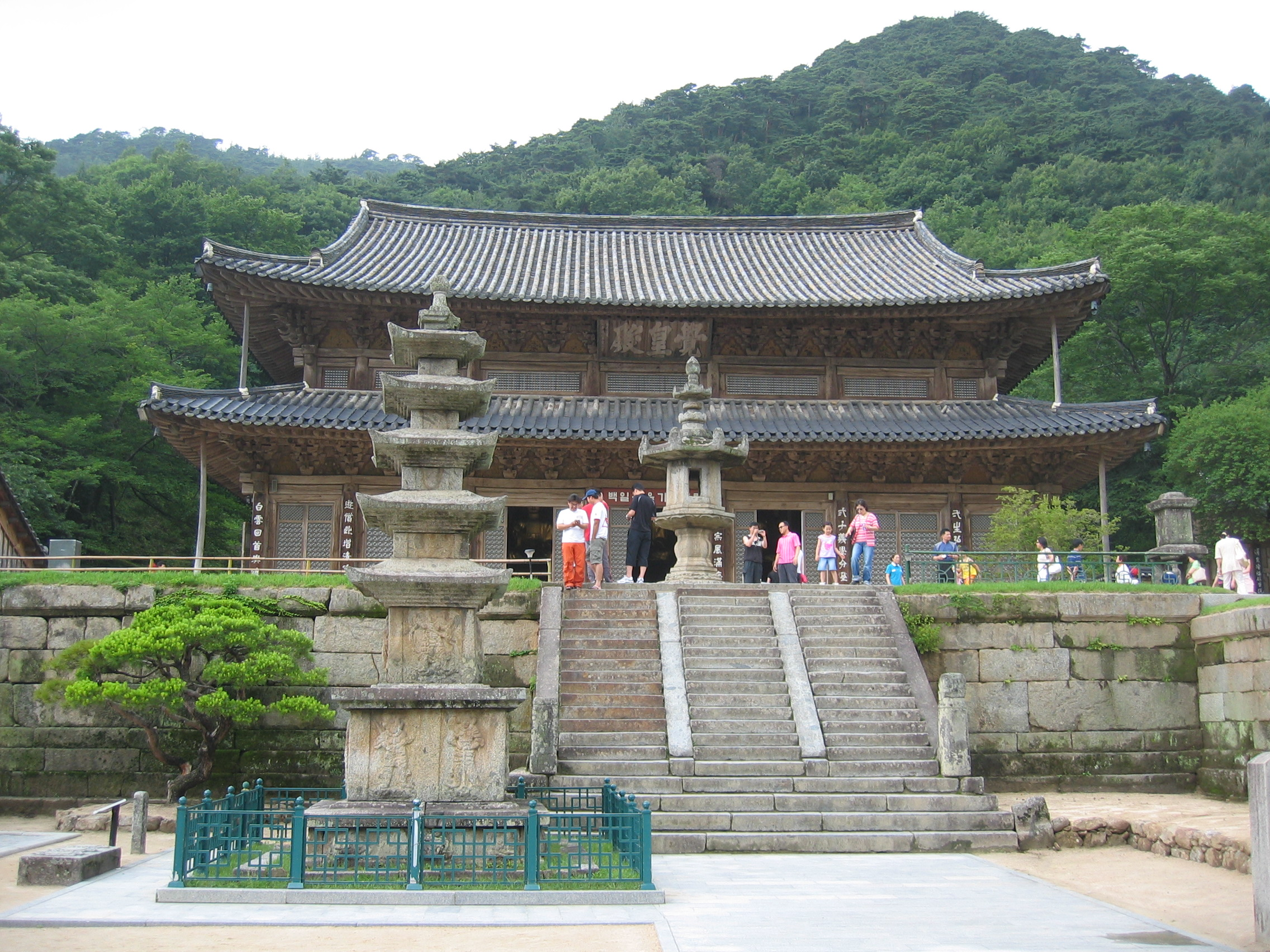
- Hwaeomsa Temple in South Korea

Religion
- Affiliation: Jogye Order of Korean Buddhism

Location
- Location: 539 Hwaeomsa-ro Masan-myeon Guryeo-gun South Jeolla Province (Korean: 전라남도 구례군 마산면 화엄사로 539)
- Country: South Korea
- Interactive map of Hwaeomsa
- Coordinates: 35°15′29.84″N 127°29′29.28″E

Architecture
- Historic Sites of South Korea
- Official name: Hwaeomsa Temple, Gurye
- Designated: 2009-12-21

Korean name
- Hangul: 화엄사
- Hanja: 華嚴寺
- Lit.: Flower Garland Temple
- RR: Hwaeomsa
- MR: Hwaŏmsa

Hwaeomsa (Korean: 화엄사; Hanja: 華嚴寺; lit. 'Flower Garland Temple') is a head temple of the Jogye Order of Korean Buddhism. It is located on the slopes of Jirisan, in Masan-myeon, Gurye County, in South Jeolla Province, South Korea.

== History ==
Hwaeomsa was established in 544 by Ven. Yeongi Josa. It was expanded in 643 by Ven. Jajang Yulsa, when the Sakyamuni Relic Pagoda, Seven-Story Pagoda, and a stone lantern were added. During the reign of King Munmu, by royal decree, Ven. Uisang Daesa inscribed the Eighty-Fascicle Avataṃsaka Sutra, on stone tablets and preserved them here. In 875, Ven. Doseon Guksa expanded the temple again.

In 943 during the Goryeo era, honoring the deathbed wish of Ven. Doseon Guksa, the state began to first establish 500 Seon temples, followed by 3,800 "Bibo-sachal," at sites where bad geomantic energy needed to be transformed. Hwaeomsa was the first temple to be renovated. There were four more renovations thereafter during the reigns of King Gwangjong, King Munjong, King Injong and King Chungsuk, respectively.

In 1593, most of Hwaeomsa's buildings were burned to the ground in the Japanese invasion. However, the temple still preserves pieces of Ven. Uisang Daesa's stone tablets inscribed with sutras, "Hwaeom Seokgyeong (Treasure No. 1040)" which were left from the tablets shattered in the fire set by the invaders. Later, Ven. Byeogam Gakseong reconstructed some of the buildings, including the Main Buddha Hall (1630-1636).

In 1701, in the 27th year of King Sukjong's reign, the reconstruction of Hwaeomsa was completed, and the king designated it the great temple of the combined schools of doctrine and meditation. Buildings and gates completed at this time were: Daeungjeon, Gakhwangjeon, Bojeru, Myungbujeon, Wontongjeon, Yeongsanjeong, Eunghyanggak, Jeongmugdang, Geumgangmun and Cheonwangmun.

== Cultural properties ==
Of the wealth of cultural properties owned by Hwaeomsa, the first one to catch the eye is Gakhwangjeon Hall (National Treasure No. 67), which literally means "a building where enlightened kings reside." Though it was built during the reign of Joseon's King Sukjong, under a state policy that promoted Confucianism and suppressed Buddhism, Gakhwangjeon's size is only exceeded by Geunjeongjeon, the palace building where the king took care of official business. Gakhwangjeon was built on the former site of Jangnyukjeon, which had been burnt down, and King Sukjong gave the name of "Gakhwangjeon" to the newly built hall.

In front of Gakhwangjeon stands a giant Stone Lantern (National Treasure No. 12), befitting the size of Gakhwangjeon. Thought to have been sculpted during the United Silla era, it is 6.4 meters (21 feet) high, and 2.8 meters (9 feet) in diameter. Slightly up and to the left of Gakhwangjeon stands the Four-Lion Three-Story Stone Pagoda (National Treasure No. 35) carved in granite. Among non-standard pagodas, it is considered to have a higher degree of completeness, along with Dabotap Pagoda at Bulguksa Temple. Four lions make up the foundation and support the whole pagoda. In the center of the four lions stands Ven. Yeongi Josa's mother to whom, on his knees, he is offering tea out of deep filial piety.

Other cultural objects of Hwaeomsa include: Scroll Painting of the Vulture Peak Assembly (National Treasure No. 301); Eastern Five-Story Stone Pagoda (Treasure No. 132); Western Five-Story Stone Pagoda (Treasure No. 133); Daeungjeon Hall (Treasure No. 299); Lion Pagoda in front of Wontongjeon Hall (Treasure No. 300); Reliquaries from the Western Five-Story Stone Pagoda (Treasure No. 1348); Scroll Painting of the Vairocana Buddha Triad in Daeungjeon Hall (Treasure No. 1363); and Seated Wooden Vairocana Buddha Triad (Treasure No. 1548).

Two trees here have been designated natural monuments: the Winter-Flowering (Natural Monument No. 38) and the Plum Tree (Natural Monument No. 485). Seon Master Buyong Yeonggwan composed a poem about this plum tree.

== Tourism ==
It also offers temple stay programs where visitors can experience Buddhist culture.

== Gallery ==
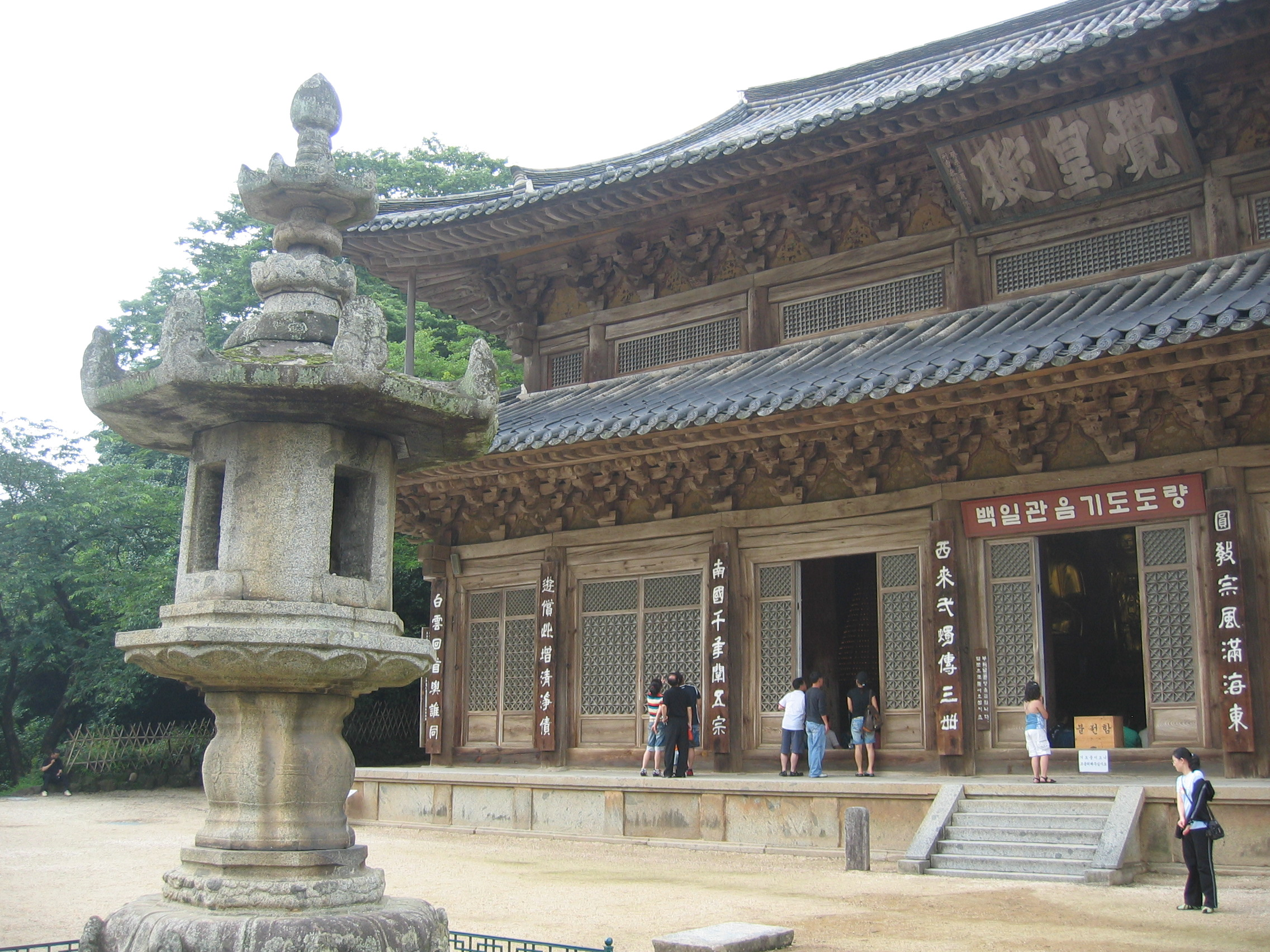

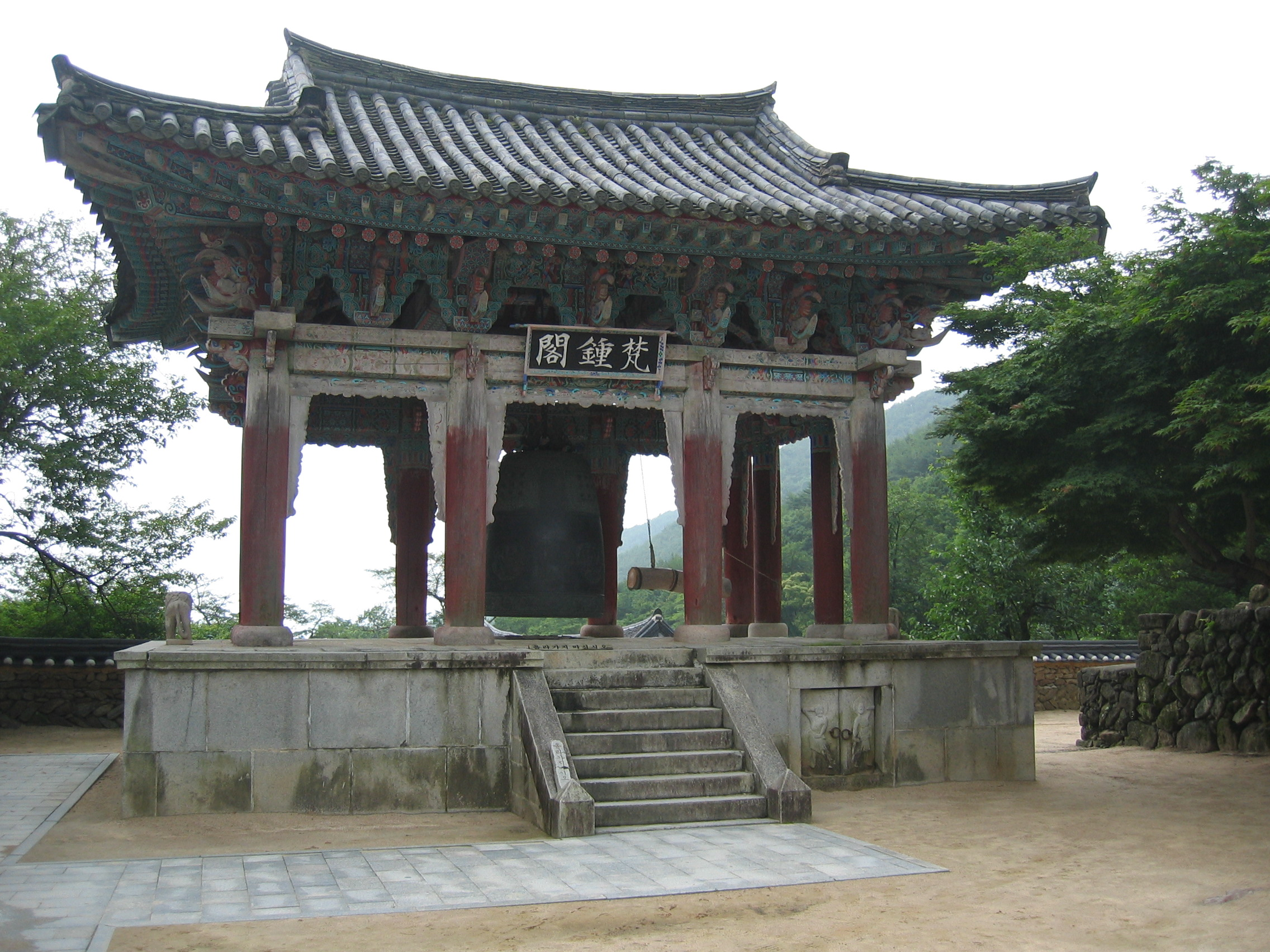

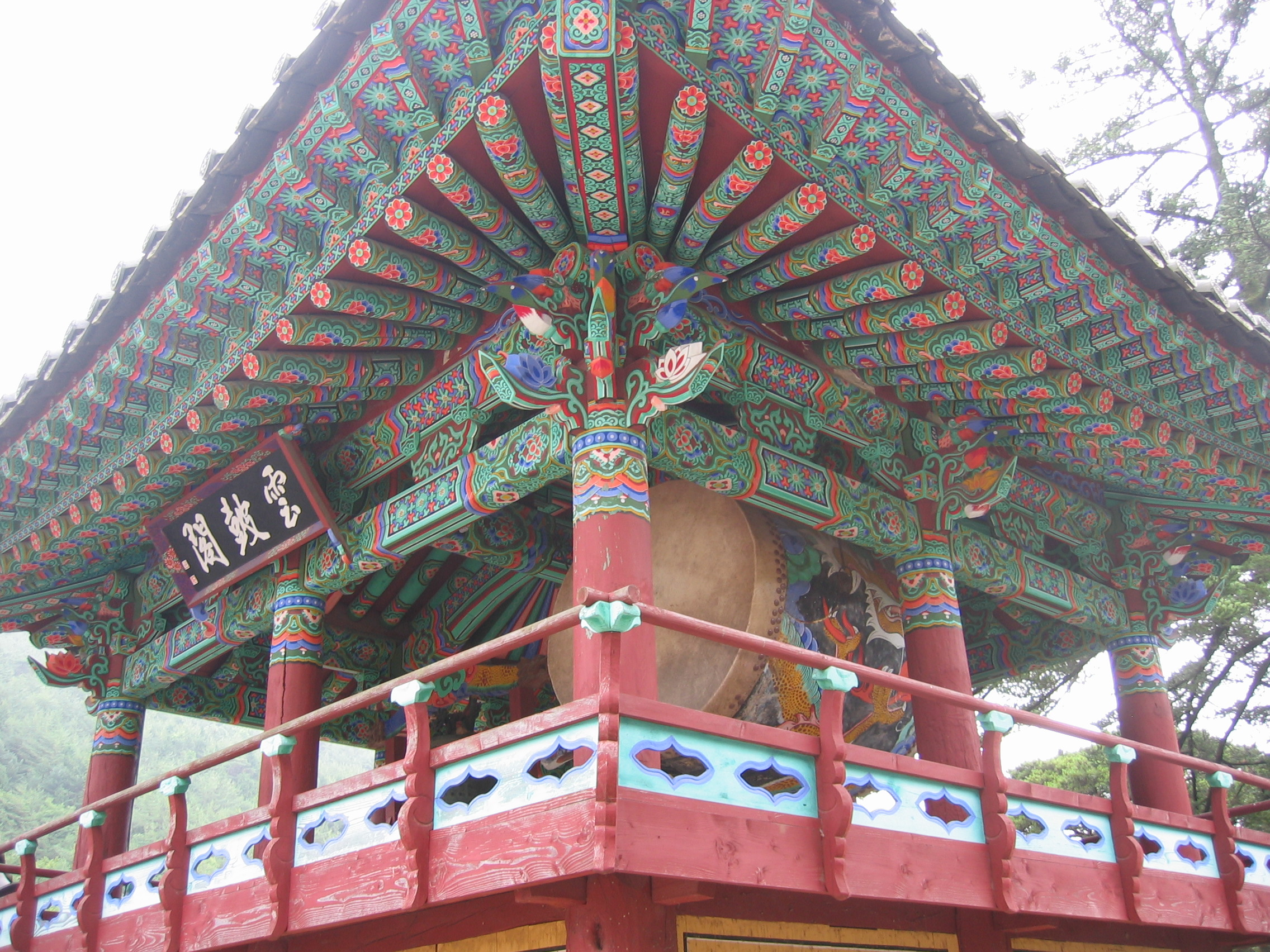

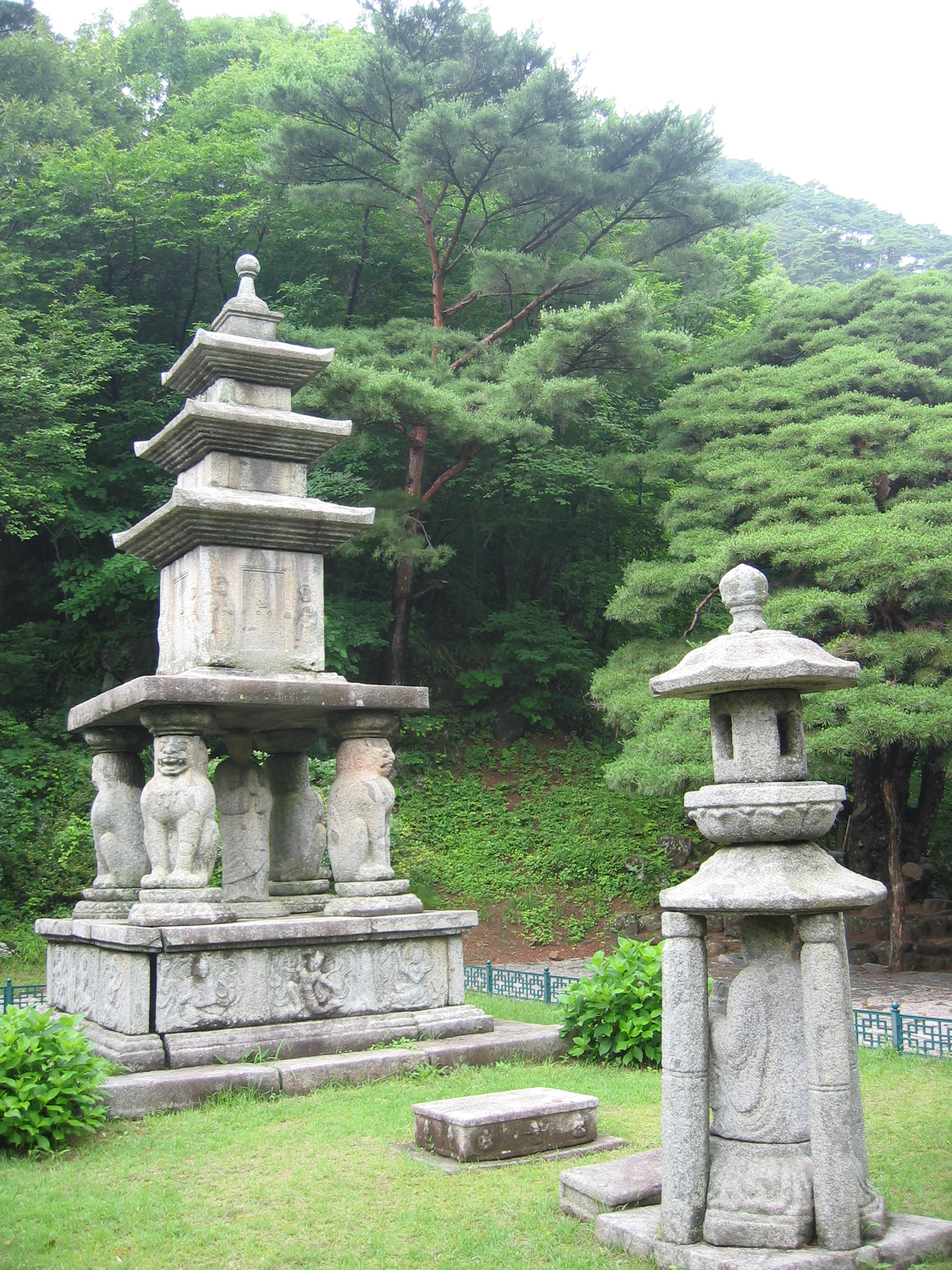

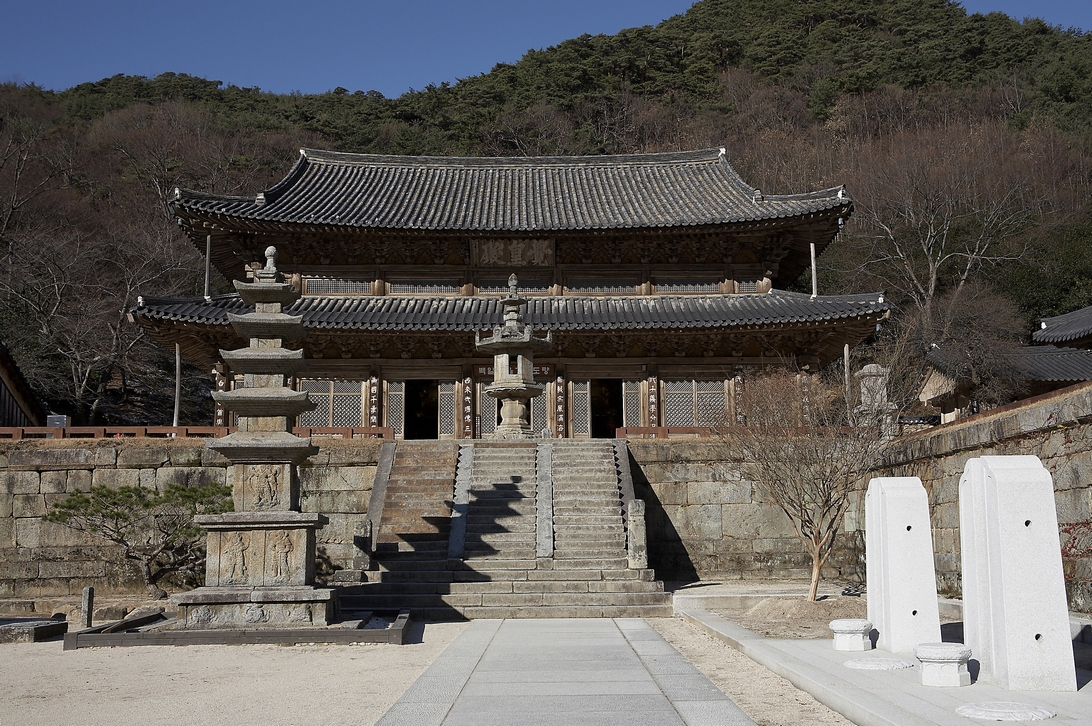

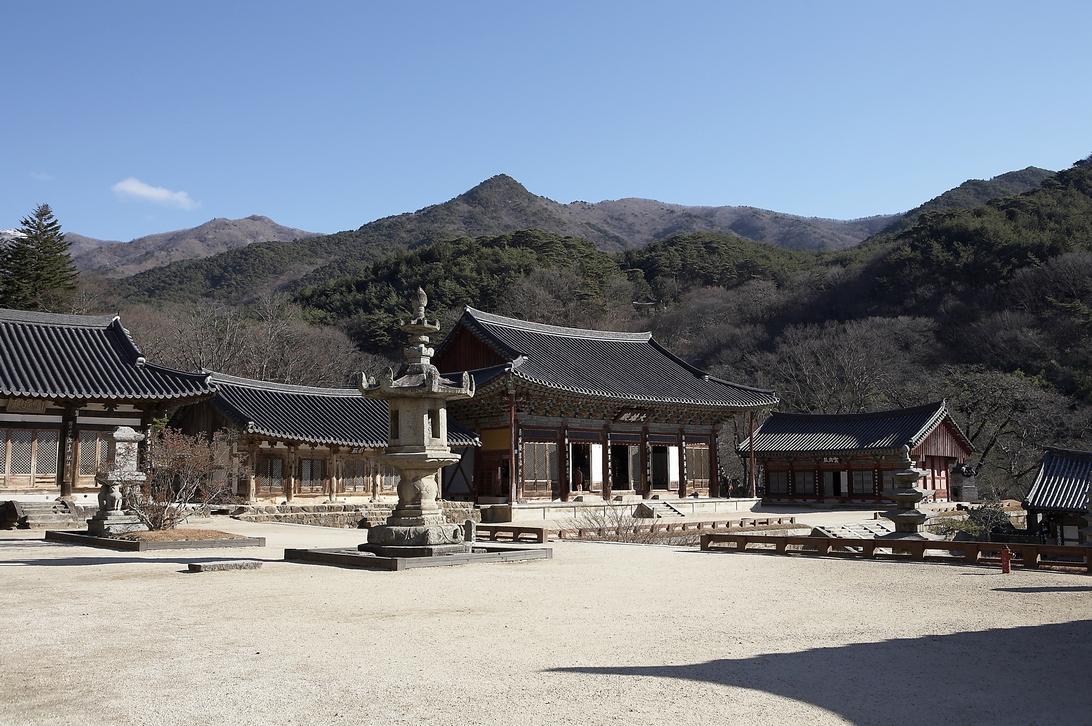

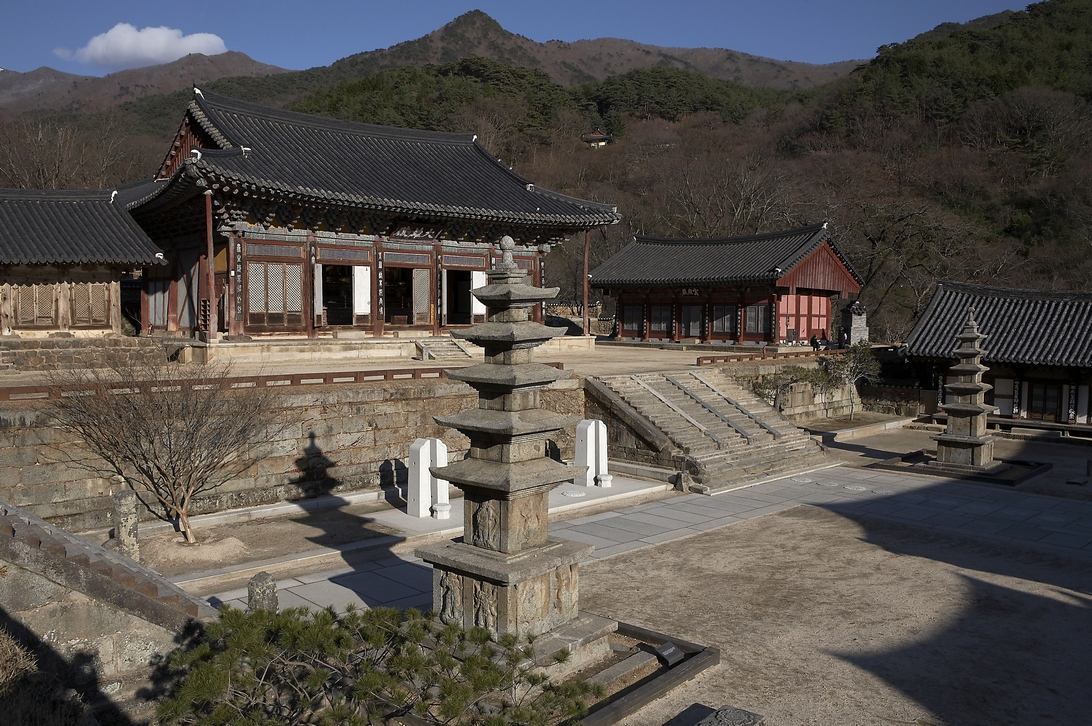

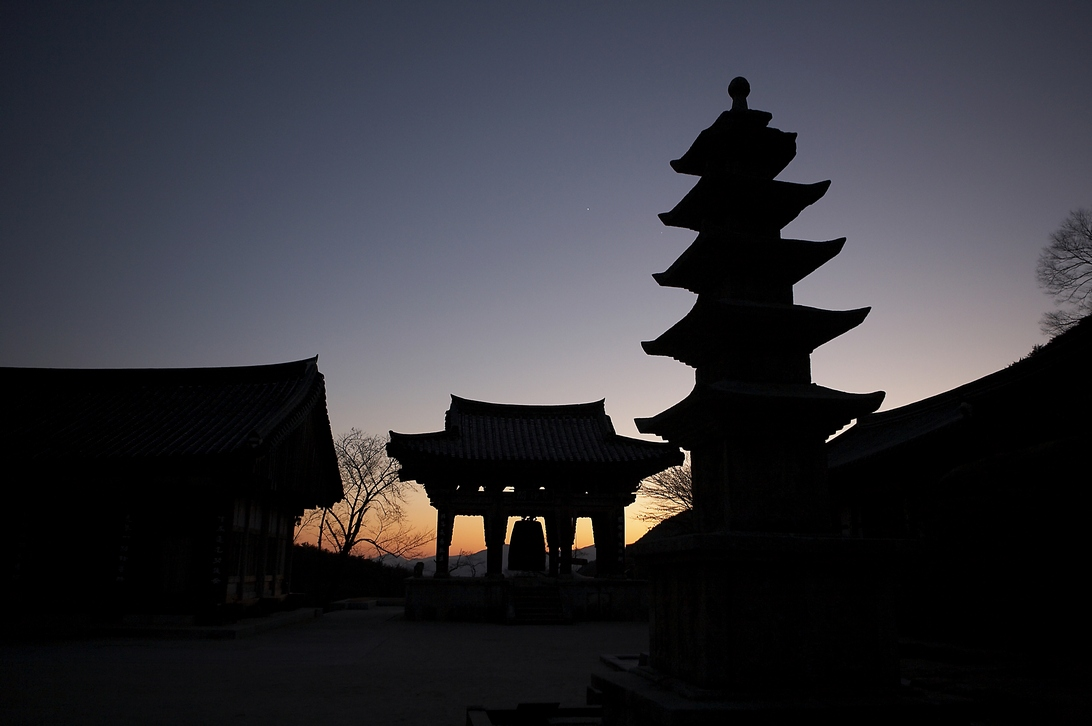

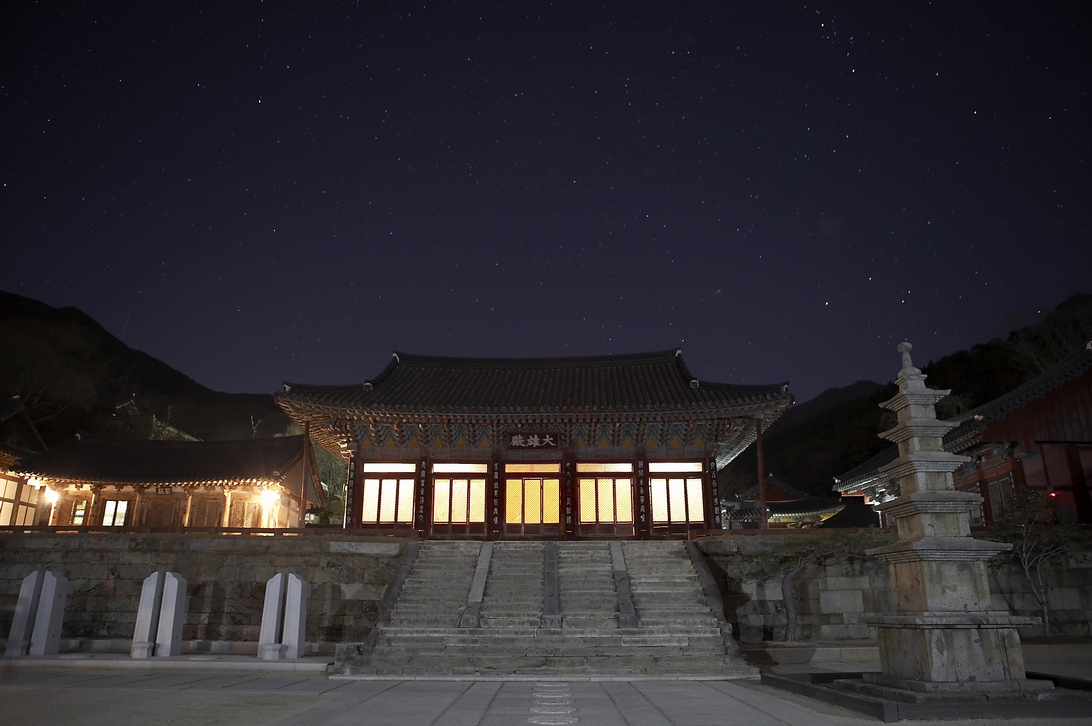

== See also ==
- Hwaeom
- Korean Buddhist temples
- Religion in South Korea
- Ssanggyesa, another major temple on Jiri-san
