= 1931 in Japan =

- Decades: 1910s; 1920s; 1930s; 1940s; 1950s
- See also: Other events of 1935; History of Japan; Timeline; Years

Events in the year 1931 in Japan.

== Incumbents ==
- Emperor: Hirohito
- Prime Minister:
  - Osachi Hamaguchi: until April 14
  - Wakatsuki Reijirō: April 14 – December 13
  - Inukai Tsuyoshi: from December 13

=== Governors ===
- Aichi Prefecture:
  - starting 20 January: Masao Oka
  - 20 January-21 December: Kosaka Masayasu
  - until 21 December: Yujiro Osaki
- Akita Prefecture: Koki Hiegata (until 18 December); Takeshi Uchida (starting 18 December)
- Aomori Prefecture: Migaku Moriya (until 18 December); Teizaburo Miyamoto (starting 18 December)
- Ehime Prefecture: Koichiro Sasai (until 18 December); Kume Shigeo (starting 18 December)
- Fukui Prefecture: Tachibana Saitanao (until 18 December); Keizo Ichimura (starting 18 December)
- Fukushima Prefecture:
  - until 15 April: Koyanagi Makimamoru
  - 15 April-18 December: Goro Kawasaki
  - starting 18 December: Murai Hachiro
- Gifu Prefecture:
  - until 8 May: Ken Usawa
  - 8 May-18 December: Yoshida Katsutaro
  - starting 18 December: Takehiko Ito
- Gunma Prefecture:
  - until 27 June: Hotta Kanae
  - 27 June-18 December: Kiichi Harata
  - starting 18 December: Masao Kanazawa
- Hiroshima Prefecture:
  - until 8 May: Hiroshi Kawabuchi
  - 8 May-18 December: Takekai Shirane
  - starting 18 December: Ryo Chiba
- Ibaraki Prefecture:
  - until 27 June: Shozo Ushijima
  - 27 June-18 December: Tanaka
  - starting 18 December: Seikichi Kimishima
- Ishikawa Prefecture: Nakano Kunikazu (until month unknown)
- Iwate Prefecture: Toyoshiro Kubo (until 18 December); Hidehiko Ishiguro (starting 18 December)
- Kagawa Prefecture:
  - until 27 June: Susumu Tsuboi
  - 27 June-18 December: Yusai Takahashi
  - starting 18 December: Akira Ito
- Kanagawa Prefecture: Jiro Yamagata (until month unknown)
- Kochi Prefecture:
  - until 27 June: Tanaka
  - 27 June-18 December: Tsuboi
  - starting 18 December: Kodora Akamatsu
- Kumamoto Prefecture: Bunpei Motoyama (until 18 December); Kenichi Yamashita (starting 18 December)
- Kyoto Prefecture:
  - until October: Sasaki Shinichi
  - October-December: Shinya Kurosaki
  - starting December: Sukenari Yokoyama
- Mie Prefecture: Keizo Ichimura (until 18 December); Hirose Hisatada (starting 18 December)
- Miyagi Prefecture: Michio Yuzawa
- Miyazaki Prefecture:
  - until 18 December: Ariyoshi
  - 18 December-21 December: Kiyoshi Nakarai
  - starting 21 December: Gisuke Kinoshita
- Nagano Prefecture: Shintaro Suzuki (until 18 December); Ishigaki Kuraji (starting 18 December)
- Niigata Prefecture:
- until 2 October: Toyoji Obata
- 2 October-18 December: Nakano Kunikazu
- starting 18 December: Obata Toyoji
- Okinawa Prefecture: Jiro Ino
- Osaka Prefecture: Saito Munenori (starting month unknown)
- Saga Prefecture:
  - until 18 December: Inoue
  - 20 January-18 December: Nakarai Kiyoshi
  - starting 18 December: Saburo Hayakawa
- Saitama Prefecture:
  - until 15 April: Niwa Shichiro
  - 15 April-18 December: Kozo Yamanaka
  - starting 18 December: Umekichi Miyawaki
- Shiname Prefecture:
  - until 21 August: Keiichi Omori
  - 21 August-18 December: Kanichi Misawa
  - starting 18 December: Rinsaku Yagi
- Tochigi Prefecture:
  - until 27 January: Harada
  - 20 January-27 December: Asari Saburo
  - starting 27 December: Chokichi Toshima
- Tokyo: Torataro Shizuka (until 18 October); Hasegawa Hisakazu (starting 18 October)
- Toyama Prefecture: Kozo Yamanaka (until 15 April); Keiichi Suzuki (starting 15 April)
- Yamagata Prefecture:
  - until 24 October: Kubota Osamu Kosuke
  - 24 October-18 December: Ken Yamaguchi
  - starting 18 December: Sada Kawamura

== Events ==
- March – March Incident
- March 27 – A real estate brand, Shōei Corporation was founded, as predecessor for Hullic.
- June 5 – 1931 Empress of Canada stabbings: A man killed 2 and wounded 29 others with a knife aboard the Canadian Pacific Steamships liner RMS Empress of Canada as the ship sailed off Japan.
- June 27 – Nakamura Incident
- July 1 – Wanpaoshan Incident
- September 21 – A Richer Scale magnitude 6.5 earthquake hit in Yorii, Saitama Prefecture. According to Japanese government official confirmed report, killing 16 persons, 146 persons were wounded.
- October 21 – October Incident
- November 4 – Resistance at Nenjiang Bridge
- November 4–18 – Jiangqiao Campaign
- Unknown date
  - Teikyo Commerce School, later Teikyo University was founded in Tokyo.
  - A time recorder and robot brand, Amano was founded in Yokohama, as predecessor name of Amano Manufacturing.
  - A mail order cram school, Jitsuryoku-Zōshinsha (Ability Promotion), as predecessor of Zōshinsha Holdings (Z-kai) was founded.

== Films ==
- Tokyo Chorus

== Births ==
=== January–March ===
- January 2 – Toshiki Kaifu, Prime Minister of Japan (d. 2022)
- January 6 – Kaoru Yachigusa, actress (d. 2019)
- January 20 – Ariyoshi Sawako, writer (d. 1984)
- January 21 – Yoshiko Kuga, actress (d. 2024)
- January 28 – Sakyo Komatsu, science fiction writer (d. 2011)
- February 16 – Ken Takakura, actor (d. 2014)
- March 7 – Atsuko Ikeda, fourth daughter of Emperor Shōwa
- March 9 – Masahiro Shinoda, film director (d. 2025)

=== April–June ===
- April 11 – Koichi Sugiyama, composer and conductor (d. 2021)
- May 10 – Ichirō Nagai, voice actor (d. 2014)
- June 22 – Teruyuki Okazaki, black belt in Shotokan Karate (d. 2020)

=== July–September ===
- July 5 – Ryuzo Sato, economist
- July 11 – Yasuo Ōtsuka, animator (d. 2021)
- August 29 – Ichikawa Raizō VIII, actor (d. 1969)
- August 30 – Jōji Yanami, voice actor
- September 17 – Ayako Sono, writer (d. 2021)
- September 21 – Syukuro Manabe, Japanese-American meteorologist and climatologist

=== October–December ===
- October 24 – Ken Utsui, actor (d. 2014)
- November 29 – Shintaro Katsu, actor (d. 1997)
- December 5 – Kyōko Kagawa, actress
- December 11 – Fujiko Yamamoto, actress
- December 15 – Shuntarō Tanikawa, poet and translator
- December 19 – Reiko Sato, actress and dancer (d. 1981)
- December 31 – Sakata Tōjūrō IV, kabuki actor (d. 2020)

=== Full date unknown ===
- Miyozo Yamazaki, amateur archaeologist

== Deaths ==
- January 27 – Nishinoumi Kajirō II, Sumo wrestler, 25th yokozuna (b. 1880)
- June 13 – Kitasato Shibasaburō, physician and bacteriologist (b. 1853)
- June 26 – Yamakawa Kenjirō, physicist, university president (b. 1854)
- August 2 – Kinue Hitomi, sprinter and long jumper (b. 1907)
- August 26 – Osachi Hamaguchi, Prime Minister of Japan (b. 1870)
- September 2 – Ichinohe Hyoe, general (b. 1855)
- November 11 – Shibusawa Eiichi, industrialist (b. 1840)

== See also ==
- 1931 in Japanese football
- List of Japanese films of the 1930s
