= Korean Patriotic Organization =

1931–1932 Korean militant activist group

- Founding leader: Kim Ku
- Founded: 1931
- Dissolved: May 1932
- Country: Korea
- Allegiance: Korean Provisional Government
- Headquarters: Shanghai, Republic of China
- Ideology: Korean independence movement
- Size: Around 80 members

Korean name
- Hangul: 한인애국단
- Hanja: 韓人愛國團
- RR: Hanin aegukdan
- MR: Hanin aeguktan

Alternate name
- Hangul: 의생군
- Hanja: 義生團
- RR: Uisaenggun
- MR: Ŭisaenggun

The Korean Patriotic Organization (Note: Name is sometimes translated as the Korean Patriotic Corps or Korean Patriotic Legion) (Korean: 한인애국단) was a militant organization under the Korean Provisional Government (KPG) and founded in Shanghai, China in 1931. It aimed to assassinate military and government leaders of the Empire of Japan. The group also went by the name Ŭisaenggun.

Most notably, the group was behind a nearly successful assassination attempt on Emperor Hirohito in January 1932 and a successful attack in Hongkou Park (now Lu Xun Park) in April 1932. After May 1932, the group largely stopped its activities and disbanded.

The organization ultimately improved the relationship between the KPG and the Republic of China government, although it provoked a crackdown on KPG activities from the Japanese.

It was founded and led by Kim Ku, a prominent member of the Korean independence movement. Its executives were Kim Suk, An Gong-geun, Lee Su-bong, and Lee Yu-pil. Notable members included Yun Bong-gil, Lee Bong-chang, Lee Deok-ju, and Choi Heung-sik.

== Background ==
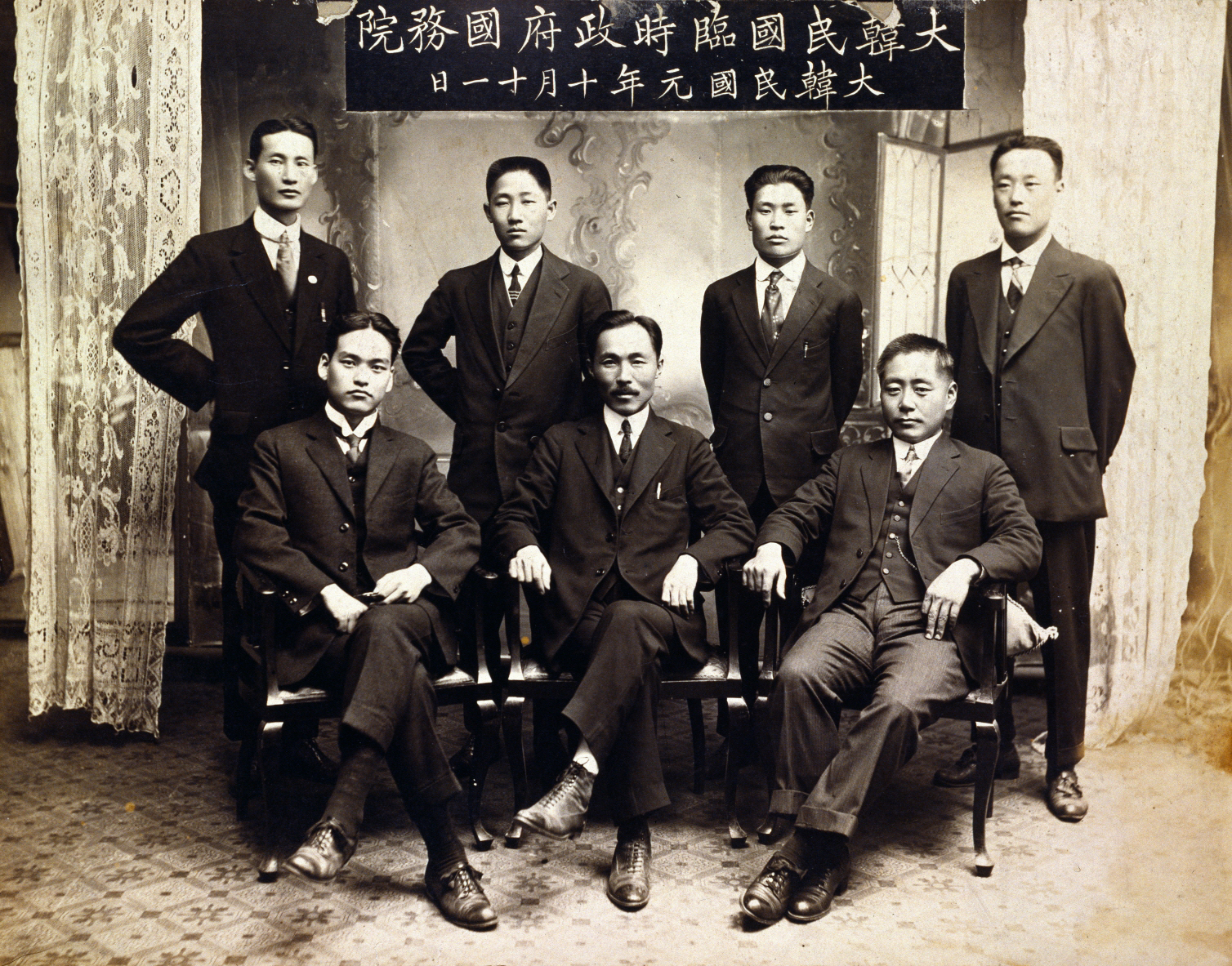
State Council Commemorative of the Provisional Government of the Republic of Korea, 1919

In 1910, the Empire of Japan formally colonized Korea. In 1919, protests were held throughout Korea against Japanese rule, in what became known as the March First Movement. The movement was violently suppressed, and numerous Koreans fled the peninsula and continued resisting the Japanese from abroad. A month afterwards, the Korean Provisional Government (KPG), a government in exile, was formed in Shanghai. However, the group was plagued with infighting and financial difficulties for much of its history. By 1931, it was on the verge of collapse.

In May 1931, Lee Bong-chang came to Shanghai. Lee was a Korean man who could pass as Japanese, but had experienced discrimination in Japan. Lee met with Kim Ku, a prominent figure in the KPG. Lee asked if he could join the KPG, but Kim said it wouldn't be worth it, as the group was unstable and lacked power.

Japan began creating pretexts to invade Manchuria in Northeast China in 1931. In the July 1931 Wanpaoshan Incident, it sensationalized a minor dispute between Chinese and Korean farmers in order to stir up anti-Chinese sentiment in Korea and Japan. This even led to violent clashes between Koreans and Chinese in their respective countries. On September 18, 1931, the Empire of Japan staged the Liutiaohu incident (bombing of a Manchu railroad) and Mukden Incident, which increased anti-Japanese sentiment amongst the Chinese.

== Creation and organization ==
Information about when and how the Korean Patriotic Organization (KPO) was founded is sparse. According to Kim's later writings, Kim decided to create the KPO after his conversation with Lee and the Wanpaoshan Incident. He felt that the Korean independence movement was stagnating and that Chinese and Korean people needed to unify against Japan.

Kim proposed the group's creation to the rest of the KPG, and the KPG agreed to fund it. Jo So-ang initially dubbed it Ŭisaenggun (의생군) and made Kim the leader of the group. The name was apparently changed because while Kim Ku was asleep, a child tore up the piece of paper that had the name written on it, so Kim created his own name for the group. The KPO was allocated half of the budget of the entire KPG and given relative autonomy on how to execute its missions. Other members included Kim Suk, Ahn Gong-geun, Lee Su-bong, and Lee Yu-pil. The group had around 80 members.

=== Funding conflict and rival group ===
There was some conflict over the group's funding. In November 1931, Jo received support money from the Chinese government, but instead of handing half of it over to Kim Ku (who was the treasurer of the KPG at that time), kept it for his own purposes. Jo used the funds to establish his own militant group (한국의용대; 韓國義勇隊; lit. 'Korean Volunteers Army'; not to be confused with the 1938 Korean Volunteers Army). Jo then sought approval from the KPG for that group, but it was ultimately rejected due to the strong protests of Kim. According to Son Sae-il, there are unconfirmed rumors that the group disbanded around January 1932.

== Sakuradamon Incident ==
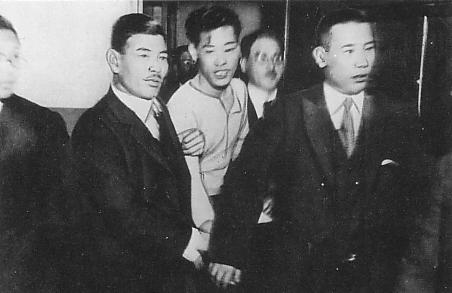
Lee Bong-chang under arrest (1932)

In late 1931, Kim Ku sent Lee Bong-chang to Tokyo to assassinate Japanese Emperor Hirohito. Bong-chang arrived in Tokyo in early January 1932. On January 8, Hirohito exited the royal palace for a military review in a Tokyo suburb alongside Puyi, the former emperor of the Qing dynasty and then Emperor of Manchukuo. In front of the Sakurada Gate, Lee threw a hand grenade that missed Hirohito's carriage. Lee was sentenced to death in a closed trial on September 30. He was executed in Ichigaya Prison on October 10.

== Hongkou Park Incident ==
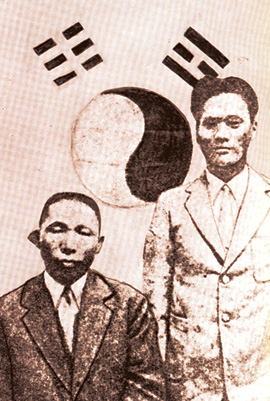
Kim and Yun, in front of the flag of the KPG (April 27, 1932)

On April 29, 1932, KPO member Yun Bong-gil detonated a bomb at a Japanese rally in Hongkou Park, Shanghai. He had a second bomb, that he had intended to use to kill himself, but it failed to go off. He was almost lynched by the crowd, but arrested and whisked away by the Japanese military before that could happen. The event drew significant publicity and made the Kim and the KPG infamous. Chiang Kai-shek, leader of the Republic of China, said of the incident "One Korean succeeding in accomplishing what a million Chinese soldiers failed to do". Chiang would then provide funding and protection for the KPG until 1945.

== Other failed missions ==
On 3 March, the KPO planned a mission but did not execute it. After the January 28 incident between China and Japan, Kim developed a plan to use Korean laborers to sabotage Japanese airplane hangars and ammunition dumps with explosives. However, China was defeated before the mission began.

In April 1932, members Yu Chin-sik (유진식; 兪鎭植) and Yi Dŏk-chu (이덕주; 李德柱) were sent to Korea to assassinate Japanese Governor-General of Korea Kazushige Ugaki. If Yun had not been captured, he would have been on this mission. However, the mission failed; Yu was arrested around April 24 to 28, and Yi was arrested afterwards in Haeju.

On 26 May 1932, the KPO failed another mission. The targets were Kwantung Army general Honjō Shigeru, Japanese Foreign Minister and President of the South Manchuria Railway company Uchida Kōsai, and Kwantung Governor Mannosuke Yamaoka. (Note: Japanese: 山岡萬之助) The targets were going to appear at Dalian station on 26 May at 7:40 pm, for a meeting with delegates from the League of Nations. Kim dispatched members Ch'oe Heung-sik in late March and Yu Sang-kŭn on 27 April to Dalian, in Manchuria. (Note: 최흥식; 崔興植 and 유상근; 柳相根) Kim dispatched Ch'oe a month earlier than Yu, in order to have him scope out the area before the attack. Yu, carrying weapons and a canteen bomb, similar to a bomb used by Yun at Hongkou Park, arrived at Dalian on 4 May. However, a telegram they had sent at the Dalian post office days prior was intercepted by the Japanese. Ch'oe was found in his hideout, tortured for the whereabouts of Yu, and executed. Yu was caught on 25 May, sentenced to life imprisonment, and died on 14 August 1945, a day before the liberation of Korea.

== Aftermath ==
After the Shanghai bombings in late April, the KPG and Kim especially became infamous. Kim's role in planning the attacks were published by newspapers in Shanghai. Various Japanese government bodies put bounties on him worth a combined 60,000 Dayang (Chinese: 大洋), an enormous sum for that time. The Japanese police authorities rushed to arrest key figures of the KPG. Many KPG officials, including Kim, went on the run, relocating numerous times until 1939. The existence of the overall group remained a secret until October 1932, which Kim published a statement on how the attacks were organized.

The KPG's activities were severely disrupted, and it did not resume regular activities until 1939. As a result, the KPO largely ceased to exist after 1932. The attacks also led to the assassination of Ok Kwan-bin and several other Japanese sympathizers of Korean descent in China.

However, the KPG did somewhat benefit from the attacks. It significantly improved Chinese-Korean ties. Before 1932, the KPG did not have a source of stable revenue, and largely worked off of donations. The Kuomintang began providing funding and protection for the KPG in 1934, and continued doing so the liberation of Korea in 1945.

== See also ==
- Japan–Korea disputes
- Heroic Corps
- Assassination (2015 film)
- Korean National Association
