= Yamazaki =

Yamazaki or Yamasaki (written: 山崎 lit. "mountain promontory") is the 22nd most common Japanese surname. Less common variants are 山﨑 and 山咲. Notable people with the surname include:

- Amy Yamazaki, British actress
- Arturo Yamasaki, Peruvian-Mexican football referee
- Yamazaki Ansai (山崎 闇斎; 1619–1682), Japanese philosopher and scholar
- Yamazaki Ben'nei (山崎辨榮, 1859–1920), Japanese Buddhist monk
- Ema Ryan Yamazaki (山崎 エマ; born 1989), Japanese-British documentary filmmaker
- Erii Yamazaki (山崎 エリイ; born 1997), Japanese voice actress
- Erina Yamazaki (山崎 依里奈; born 1974), Japanese voice actress
- Haruka Yamazaki (山崎 はるか; born 1991), Japanese voice actress and singer
- Hideaki Yamazaki (山崎 秀晃; born 1987), Japanese kickboxer
- Hiroko Yamasaki (山崎 浩子; born 1960), Japanese rhythmic gymnast
- Hirona Yamazaki (山崎 紘菜; born 1994), Japanese actress
- Hironari Yamazaki (山崎 弘也; born 1976), Japanese comedian
- Hiroshi Yamazaki (山崎 博; 1946–2017), Japanese photographer
- Hiroshi Yamazaki (weightlifter) (山崎 弘; born 1937), Japanese weightlifter
- Hisatoshi Yamazaki (山崎 久寿; born 1935), Japanese field hockey player
- Hōdai Yamazaki (山崎 方代; 1914–1985), Japanese poet
- Hōsei Yamasaki (山崎 邦正; born 1968), better known as Hōsei Tsukitei, Japanese comedian and rakugo performer
- Housui Yamazaki (山崎 峰水), Japanese manga artist
- Ikusaburo Yamazaki (山崎 育三郎; born 1986), Japanese actor and singer
- Itzuki Yamazaki (山崎 五紀; born 1966), Japanese professional wrestler
- Iwao Yamazaki (山崎 巌; 1894–1963), Japanese lawyer, politician and cabinet minister
- Joann Yamazaki (山崎 ジョアン), Japanese television personality
- Jun Yamazaki (山崎 潤; born 1956), Japanese diplomat
- Kaishu Yamazaki (山﨑 海秀; born 1995), Japanese footballer
- Katsuki Yamazaki (山崎 勝己; born 1982), Japanese baseball player
- Kazuhiko Yamazaki (山崎 一彦; born 1971), Japanese hurdler
- Kazuo Yamazaki (山崎 一夫; born 1962), Japanese professional wrestler and commentator
- Kōji Yamazaki (山崎 幸二; born 1961), Japanese general
- Kengo Yamazaki (山﨑 謙吾; born 1992), Japanese sprinter
- Kenta Yamazaki (山崎 健太; born 1987), Japanese footballer
- Kento Yamazaki (山﨑 賢人; born 1994), Japanese actor
- Kore Yamazaki (ヤマザキ コレ), Japanese manga artist
- Kōji Yamazaki (山崎 幸二; born 1961), Japanese general
- Kosuke Yamazaki (山﨑 浩介; born 1995), Japanese footballer
- Kotaro Yamazaki (山崎 光太郎; born 1978), Japanese footballer
- Kunio Yamazaki, Japanese biologist
- Kyoko Yamazaki (山崎 京子; born 1954), Japanese archer
- Lindsey Yamasaki (born 1980), American women's basketball player
- Makoto Yamazaki (山崎 真; born 1970), Japanese footballer and manager
- Mami Yamasaki (山崎 真実; born 1985), Japanese gravure idol and actress
- Mari Yamazaki (ヤマザキ マリ; born 1967), Japanese manga artist
- Mario Yamasaki, Brazilian mixed martial arts referee
- Marumi Yamazaki (山崎 円美; born 1990), Japanese women's footballer
- Masaaki Yamazaki (山崎 正昭; 1942–2026), Japanese politician
- Masaharu Yamazaki (山崎 正晴; born 1968), Japanese cross-country skier
- Masakazu Yamazaki (山崎 正和; 1934–2020), Japanese writer, literary critic and philosopher
- Masato Yamazaki (footballer, born 1981) (山﨑 雅人), Japanese footballer
- Masato Yamazaki (footballer, born 1990) (山﨑 正登), Japanese footballer
- Masayoshi Yamazaki (山崎 まさよし; born 1971), Japanese musician
- Maso Yamazaki (山崎 マゾ; born 1966), Japanese musician
- Maya Yamazaki (山崎 摩耶; born 1974), Japanese politician
- Mei Yamazaki (山崎 愛生; born 2005), singer and member of the j-pop girl group Morning Musume
- Minoru Yamasaki (山崎 實; 1913–1986), Japanese-American architect
- Miyozo Yamazaki (山崎 三四造; born 1931), Japanese archaeologist
- Nao-Cola Yamazaki (山崎 ナオコーラ; born 1978), Japanese writer
- Naoko Yamazaki (山崎 直子; born 1970), Japanese astronaut
- Naomasa Yamasaki (山崎 直方; 1870–1929), Japanese geographer
- Naoyuki Yamazaki (山崎 直之; born 1991), Japanese footballer
- Nobue Yamazaki (山崎 信恵; born 1950), Japanese gymnast
- Osamu Yamazaki (山崎 修; born 1964), Japanese freestyle skier
- Ryo Yamazaki (山崎 良; born 1972), Japanese video game composer
- Ryoji Yamazaki (山崎 良次; born 1963), Japanese bobsledder
- Sachiko Yamazaki (山崎 幸子; born 1962), Japanese swimmer
- Shigueto Yamasaki (born 1966), Brazilian judoka
- Shinji Yamasaki (山崎 慎次; born 1962), Japanese water polo player
- Shunpei Yamazaki (山崎 舜平; born 1942), Japanese inventor
- Yamazaki Sōkan (山崎 宗鑑; 1465–1553), Japanese poet
- Yamazaki Susumu (山崎 烝; c. 1843 – 1868), Shinsengumi officer and spy
- Takashi Yamazaki (山崎 貴; born 1964), Japanese film director, screenwriter and visual effects director
- Takumi Yamazaki (山崎 たくみ; born 1964), Japanese voice actor
- Takayuki Yamasaki (山崎 隆之; born 1981), Japanese shogi player
- Taku Yamasaki (山崎 拓; born 1936), Japanese politician
- Terutomo Yamazaki (山崎 照朝; 1947–2025), Japanese karateka and kickboxer
- Tizuka Yamasaki (born 1949), Brazilian film director
- Tomio Yamazaki (山崎 富美雄; born 1947), Japanese ice hockey player
- Toyoko Yamazaki (山崎 豊子; 1924–2013), Japanese novelist
- Tsugio Yamazaki (山崎 次男; born 1929), Japanese sport wrestler
- Tsuruko Yamazaki (山崎 つる子; 1925–2019), Japanese artist
- Tsutomu Yamazaki (山崎 努; born 1936), Japanese actor
- Wakana Yamazaki (山崎 和佳奈; 1965–2026), Japanese actress, voice actress and narrator
- Yasuaki Yamasaki (山崎 康晃; born 1992), Japanese baseball player
- Yasutsugu Yamasaki, Japanese engineer designer of the Akashi Bridge
- Yasuyo Yamasaki (山崎 保代; 1891–1943), Imperial Japanese Army officer
- Yamazaki Yoshishige (山崎 美成; 1796–1856), Japanese essayist and antiquarian
- Yuki Yamasaki (山﨑 夕貴; born 1987), Japanese announcer
- Yuki Yamazaki (racewalker) (山崎 勇喜; born 1984), Japanese racewalker
- Yuki Yamazaki (footballer) (山崎 侑輝; born 1990), Japanese footballer

== Fictional characters ==
- Asami Yamazaki, from the Audition horror film
- Kaoru Yamazaki, from Welcome to the N.H.K.
- Linna Yamazaki, from the anime series Bubblegum Crisis
- Ryuji Yamazaki, a SNK character
- Sagaru Yamazaki, from the manga series Gintama
- Sosuke Yamazaki, from the anime series Free! - Eternal Summer
- Takashi Yamazaki, from Cardcaptor Sakura anime
- Tamaki Yamazaki, from the manga series Tamayomi
- Tanpopo Yamazaki, from the manga series Imadoki!
