= Sakuradamon incident =

Sakuradamon incident may refer to:

- Sakuradamon Incident (1860), the assassination of Ii Naosuke, Japanese Chief Minister
- Sakuradamon Incident (1932), an assassination attempt on Emperor Hirohito
