= Ran Lerner =

Industrial designer (born 1969)

- Born: 1969 (age 56–57)
- Education: Domus Academy
- Occupation: Industrial Designer
- Known for: Furniture, Lighting, household products design
- Website: www.ranlernerdesign.com

Ran Lerner (born in 1969) is an industrial designer and owner of Ran Lerner Design. Ran Lerner's product range includes household products, lighting, and furniture.

Lerner graduated from the Domus Academy located in Milan, where he received his Masters in Industrial Design in 1998. The following year in 1999, Lerner moved to Manhattan. In 2003 Ran Lerner Design Inc. was established, now known as RLD International Inc. Ran Lerner also has design patents to his name.

Lerner's clientele include Joseph Joseph, Polder, Umbra, Nambe, Kikkerland, Acme, Yamazaki, Cambridge Silversmiths, Rosenthal, Reed & Barton, Wedgwood, Waterford, SodaStream, and others.

Lerner's work has been featured in publications such as "1000 Product Designs: Form, Function, and Technology From Around the World", The New York Times, Food & Wine, ID Magazine, HFN, House & Garden, Gifts & Accessories, Maxim, Forbes, and others.

Lerner has also taught design courses at Parsons School of Design (The New School), The Fashion Institute of Technology (FIT), and The New Jersey Institute of Technology (NJIT).

Ran Lerner's designs can be found at retailers including Target, Costco, Macy's, Bloomingdales, Crate & Barrel, The Conran Shop, Moma Store, Bed Bath & Beyond, and more.

Design award winner, such as the Chicago Athenaeum Good Design Award, Lerner has exhibited his work internationally, in design and trade shows such as Salone de Mobile Milan, New York Design Week, The Forum Exhibition in Barcelona, the Pitti Uomo in Florence, and NY Now.

== Publications and articles ==
- 1000 Product Designs: Form, Function, and Technology From Around The World
- Forbes Interview with Ran Lerner- Compostable Packaging
- Core77: Ran Lerner's Latest and Greatest
- Design Milk Interview with Ran Lerner
- Food and Wine Magazine: Ran Lerner Flatware
- Design Milk Asymmetrical Oval Lamp By Ran Lerner
- Storing Wine in Style: Ran Lerner Wine Rack
- Domus Academy: Lost in Translation-Joseph Joseph- Serving Spoons by Ran Lerner
- Must-Have Tech Products from Gift Shop Magazine
- The Craters of the Moon Inspire a Watch
