= Letter by Lee Bong-chang and Remittance Certificate =

1931 Korean historical documents

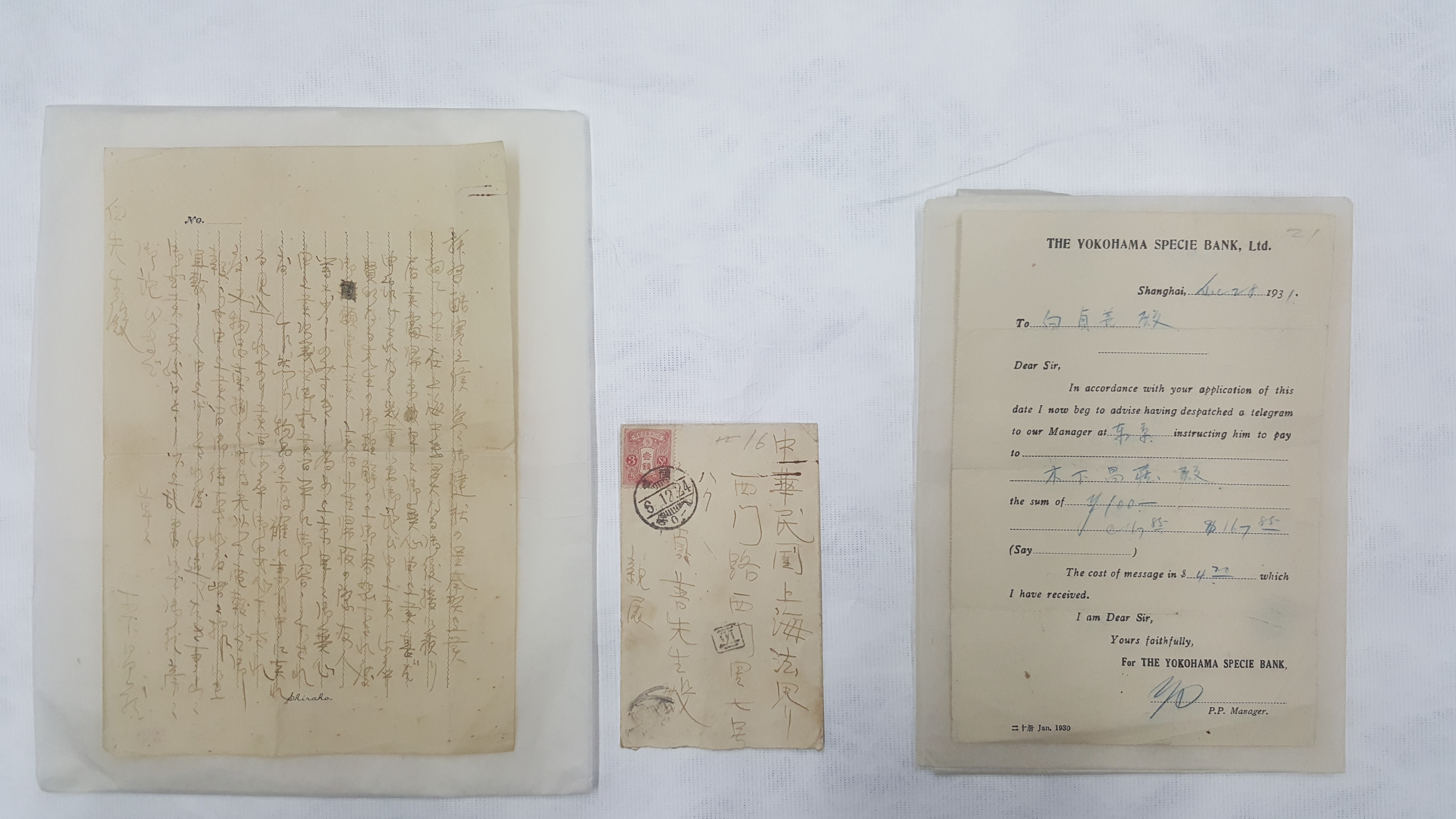
- Created: December 24 and 28, 1931
- Location: National Museum of Korea, Seoul, South Korea
- Author(s): Lee Bong-chang
- Purpose: Request for funds from Kim Ku, receipt of funds

Letter by Lee Bong-chang and Remittance Certificate (Korean: 이봉창 의사 친필 편지, 봉투 및 의거자금 송금증서) refers to a set of two documents and an envelope that has been a Registered Cultural Heritage of South Korea since April 8, 2019 (No. 745-2). The documents were produced in late 1931, to facilitate an exchange of funds between Korean independence activists Kim Ku and Lee Bong-chang. They are now stored in the National Museum of Korea in Seoul.

The first document is a handwritten letter by Lee, produced on December 24. It requests funds from Kim in order to proceed with Lee's assassination attempt on the Japanese Emperor (which Lee euphemistically refers to in the letter). The envelope is for this letter. The second document is a remittance form from the bank dated to December 28, written in English, confirming the transfer of funds to Lee.
