= Hisatoshi =

- Gender: Male

Origin
- Origin: Japanese
- Meaning: Different meanings depending on the kanji used

Hisatoshi (written: 久寿 or 永灯至) is a masculine Japanese given name. Notable people with the name include:

- Hisatoshi Shintaku (新宅 永灯至; born 1957), Japanese long-distance runner
- Hisatoshi Yamazaki (山崎 久寿; born 1935), Japanese field hockey player
