= 1931 in Japanese football =

1931 season

Japanese football in 1931.

== Emperor's Cup ==
October 31, 1931

Tokyo Imperial University LB	5–1	Kobun Junior High School
? ?' ? ?' ? ?' ? ?' ? ?'		? ?'

Meiji Jingu Gaien Stadium

== Births ==
- April 2 - Reizo Fukuhara
- April 28 - Takashi Mizuno
- July 8 - Arawa Kimura
- August 2 - Takashi Takabayashi
- August 16 - Kakuichi Mimura
- August 28 - Shunichiro Okano
- September 19 - Hiroto Muraoka
- October 7 - Ryuzo Hiraki
