= Nakamura Incident =

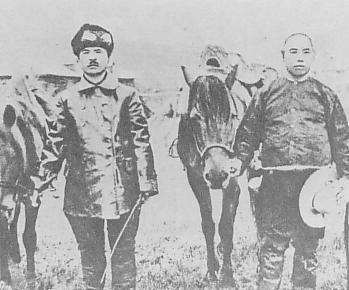
Shintarō Nakamura and Entarō Isugi

The Nakamura Incident (中村大尉事件, Nakamura taii jiken) refers to the extrajudicial killing of Imperial Japanese Army Captain Shintarō Nakamura and three others, on 27 June 1931 by Chinese soldiers in Manchuria.

== Background ==
Captain Nakamura, a regular Japanese Army officer, was on an official mission under orders of the Kwantung Army detachment in the South Manchurian Railway Zone. Early in June, Captain Nakamura obtained a huzhao (護照, passport) from the Chinese authorities in Mukden, which allowed him and his party rights of free passage through Manchuria, with the exception of the militarily-sensitive border area between Taonan and Solun (in the Xing'an Colonization Area). At Harbin, however, Nakamura obtained a second huzhao which, according to the Japanese Consul General, gave the desired permission to travel in the Taonan-Solun area.

Captain Nakamura was accompanied by Nobutarō Isugi, a retired Japanese army sergeant, a Mongolian and a Russian interpreter. Nakamura was travelling incognito, in civilian dress, and represented himself as an "agricultural expert". The party of four left Pokotu on the Chinese Eastern Railway about the middle of June, their immediate destination being Taonan. Nakamura made stops along the Chinese Eastern Railway, at Manzhouli, Qiqihar, Angangehi, and Hailar taking notes.

On 27 June 1931, the members of the party were arrested by Northeastern Army soldiers under the command of Kuan Yuheng outside Taonan, in a place called Suokungfu. According to the Chinese, Nakamura was armed and carried patent medicines, which included narcotic drugs for non-medical purposes. He and his assistants were taken to Solun, where they were summarily executed on July 1 and their bodies immediately cremated to conceal evidence of the deed. The execution may have been ordered because the Chinese had discovered that Nakamura's mission was one of espionage to find water sources and places for encampment for future Japanese military operations in northwest Manchuria.

== Consequences ==
Details of the incident became known to the Japanese public on 17 August 1931. With the news coming soon after the Wanpaoshan Incident, public opinion was further inflamed, increasing anti-Chinese sentiment in Japan. The Japanese military was quick to capitalize on this upsurge in public opinion to demand a stronger foreign policy against China. Some influential and outspoken officers, including Kanji Ishiwara, demanded that the incident be used as a casus belli to enable the Japanese Army to resolve Japan's position in Manchuria. Chinese authorities eventually agreed to investigate the case, and (per the Lytton Report) diplomatic progress appeared to be made until the Manchurian Incident later that year.

Nakamura was posthumously awarded the Order of the Golden Kite (4th class).
