= Sakurada Gate =

- 桜田門
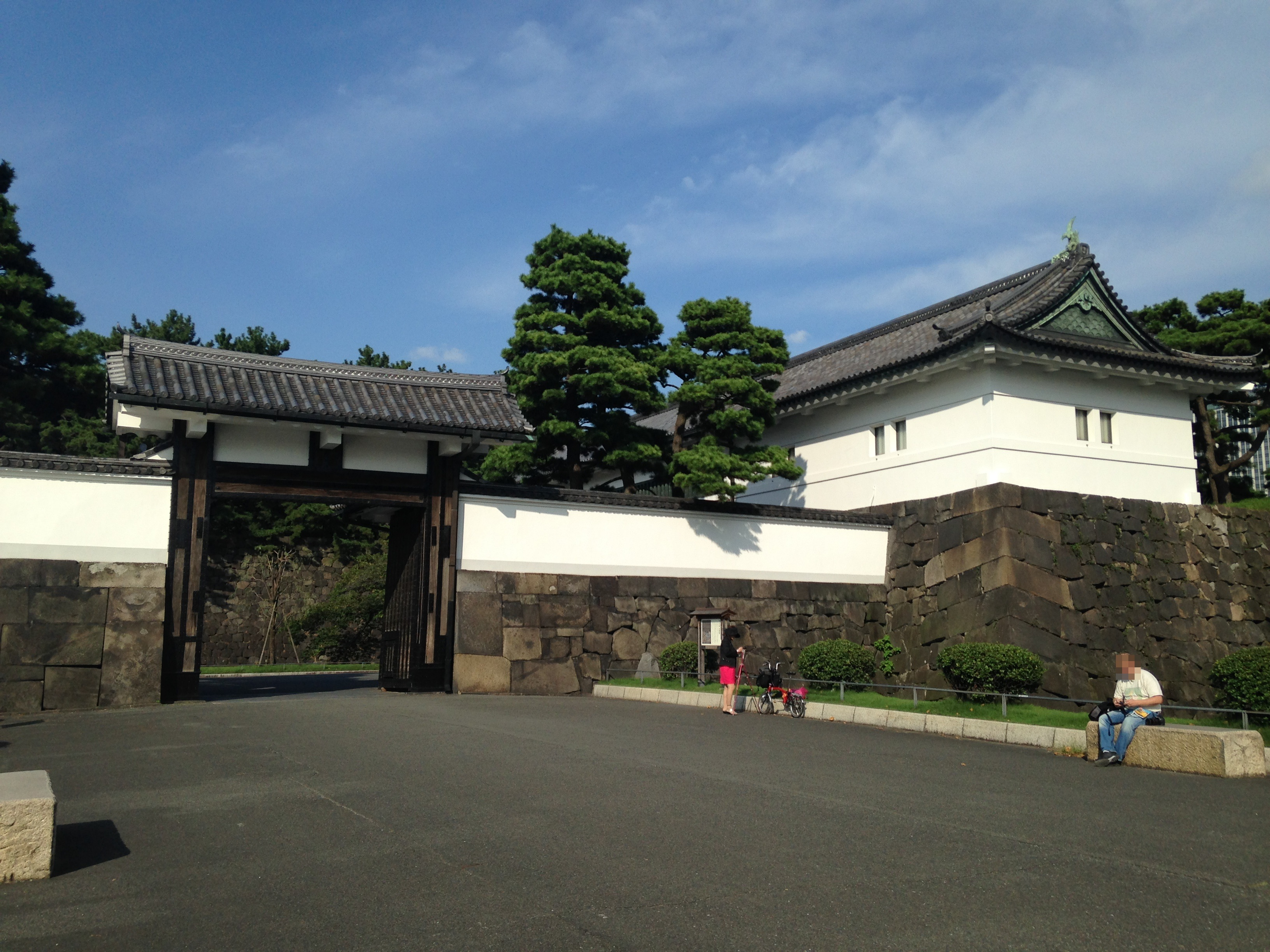
- The gate in 2015
- Interactive map of the Sakurada Gate area

General information
- Type: Gate
- Location: Tokyo Imperial Palace, Tokyo, Japan
- Coordinates: 35.6785°N 139.7539°E

Design and construction
- Known for: The Sakuradamon Incident of 1860; The Sakuradamon Incident of 1932

Sakurada Gate (桜田門, sakurada-mon) is a gate in the inner moat of Tokyo Imperial Palace in Tokyo, Japan.

It was the location of the Sakuradamon Incident in 1860, in which Tairō Ii Naosuke was assassinated outside the gate by samurai of the Mito Domain and Satsuma Domain.

In 1932, it was the location of another assassination attempt, when Korean independence activist Lee Bong-chang attempted to kill Emperor Hirohito as his procession passed through the gate.

Opposite Sakurada Gate is the headquarters of the Tokyo Metropolitan Police Department, which is also metonymically called "Sakurada Gate" (akin to London's Scotland Yard).

== Access ==
- Sakuradamon Station (Yūrakuchō Line)
- Kasumigaseki Station (Marunouchi, Hibiya, and Chiyoda lines)
