= Hiroto Muraoka =

Japanese footballer

Hiroto Muraoka 村岡 博人
Personal information
- Full name: Hiroto Muraoka
- Date of birth: September 19, 1931
- Place of birth: Bunkyo, Tokyo, Empire of Japan
- Date of death: March 13, 2017 (aged 85)
- Place of death: Kodaira, Tokyo, Japan
- Position: Goalkeeper

Youth career
- 1947–1949: University of Tsukuba High School

College career
Years	Team	Apps	(Gls)
1950–1953	Tokyo University of Education		

Senior career*
Years	Team	Apps	(Gls)
1954	Kyodai Club		

International career
1954	Japan	2	(0)
- * Club domestic league appearances and goals

Hiroto Muraoka (村岡 博人, Muraoka Hiroto; September 19, 1931 – March 13, 2017) was a Japanese footballer. He played for the Japan national team.

== Club career ==
Muraoka was born in Bunkyo, Tokyo on September 19, 1931. After graduating from the Tokyo University of Education, he played for Kyodai Club which consisted of his alma mater Tokyo University of Education players and graduates. He retired in 1954.

== National team career ==
In March 1954, when Muraoka was a Tokyo University of Education student, he was selected in the Japan national team for 1954 World Cup qualification. At this qualification, on March 7, he debuted against South Korea. He also played at 1954 Asian Games. He retired from playing career after this tournament. He played 2 games for Japan in 1954.

== After retirement ==
After retirement, Muraoka became a journalist for Kyodo News and worked until 1991.

On March 13, 2017, Muraoka died of heart failure in Kodaira at the age of 85.

== National team statistics ==
Japan national team
Year	Apps	Goals
1954	2	0
Total	2	0
