= Ariyoshi =

Ariyoshi (written: 有吉) is a Japanese surname. Notable people with the surname include:

- Chūichi Ariyoshi (有吉 忠一; 1873–1947), Japanese politician
- George Ariyoshi (有吉 良一; 1926–2026), American politician
- Hiroiki Ariyoshi (有吉 弘行; born 1974), Japanese comedian
- Koji Ariyoshi (有吉 幸治; 1914–1976), American labor unionist and activist
- Kyōko Ariyoshi (有吉 京子; born 1950), Japanese manga artist
- Michio Ariyoshi (有吉 道夫; 1935–2022), Japanese shogi player
- Saori Ariyoshi (有吉 佐織; born 1987), Japanese footballer
- Sawako Ariyoshi (有吉 佐和子; 1931–1984), Japanese writer
