= Kakuichi Mimura =

Japanese footballer and manager (1931–2022)

Kakuichi Mimura 三村 恪一
Personal information
- Full name: Kakuichi Mimura
- Date of birth: 16 August 1931
- Place of birth: Tokyo, Japan
- Date of death: 19 February 2022 (aged 90)
- Height: 1.66 m (5 ft 5 in)
- Position: Midfielder

Youth career
- Tokyo Daihachi High School
- Chuo University

Senior career*
Years	Team	Apps	(Gls)
1955–????	Toho Titanium		

International career
1955	Japan	4	(0)

Managerial career
- ????–1985: Toho Titanium
- * Club domestic league appearances and goals

Kakuichi Mimura (三村 恪一, Mimura Kakuichi; 16 August 1931 – 19 February 2022) was a Japanese football player and manager. He played for the Japan national team.

== Club career ==
Mimura was born in Tokyo on 16 August 1931. After graduating from Chuo University, he founded Toho Titanium in 1955 and played for the club.

== International career ==
On 2 January 1955, Mimura debuted for the Japan national team against Burma. He played four games for Japan in 1955. In 1956, he was selected to represent Japan in the 1956 Summer Olympics in Melbourne, but did not compete.

== Coaching career ==
After retirement, Mimura became a manager for Toho Titanium. He led the club to win Japanese Regional Leagues four times and was promoted to Japan Soccer League two times in 1982 and 1985. At the end of 1985 season, he resigned.

== Death ==
Mimura died on 19 February 2022, at the age of 90.

== Career statistics ==
Appearances and goals by national team and year
National team	Year	Apps	Goals
Japan	1955	4	0
Total		4	0
