= Sakuradamon incident (1932) =

Attempted killing of Emperor Hirohito

- Part of the Korean independence movement
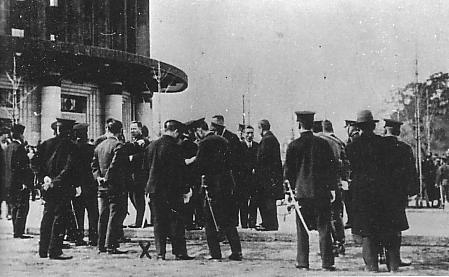
- Police gather around the spot where the grenade used in the attack landed (January 8, 1932)
- Location: Sakurada Gate, Imperial Palace, Tokyo, Empire of Japan; 35.67787°N 139.75311°E
- Planned by: Korean Patriotic Organization
- Commanded by: Kim Ku
- Target: Emperor Hirohito
- Date: January 8, 1932
- Executed by: Lee Bong-chang
- Outcome: Emperor is unharmed, Lee arrested and executed
- Location within Special wards of Tokyo

Sakuradamon incident

Korean name
- Hangul: 이봉창의사 의거 or 도쿄의거 or 사쿠라다문의거
- Hanja: 李奉昌義士 義擧 or 東京義擧 or 櫻田門義擧
Transcriptions
- Revised Romanization: I Bongchang uisa uigeo Dokyo uigeo Sakuradamun uigeo
- McCune–Reischauer: I Pongch'ang ŭisa ŭigŏ Tokyo ŭigŏ Sakuradamun ŭigŏ

Japanese name
- Kanji: 桜田門事件
- Hiragana: さくらだもんじけん
Transcriptions
- Romanization: Sakuradamon jiken

The Sakuradamon incident was an unsuccessful assassination attempt against Japanese Emperor Hirohito on January 8, 1932, at the gate Sakuradamon in Tokyo, Empire of Japan.

The attack was carried out by Korean independence activist Lee Bong-chang, a member of the Korean Patriotic Organization. Lee threw a grenade at the Japanese Emperor, but the grenade failed to kill him. Lee was promptly arrested, tried, sentenced, and executed on October 10, 1932. He is now remembered as a martyr in South Korea, where the attack is sometimes referred to as the Patriotic Deed of Lee Bong-chang (Korean: 이봉창의사 의거).

In the aftermath of the attack, Japanese authorities stepped up their search for Kim Ku and other members of the Korean Provisional Government, which had funded the operation.

== Background ==
From 1910 to 1945, Korea was a colony of the Empire of Japan. In 1919, protests against Japanese rule were held throughout Korea, in what became known as the March First Movement. After the Japanese violently cracked down on the protests, numerous Koreans fled the peninsula and continued resisting the Japanese from abroad, including members of the Provisional Government of the Republic of Korea.

Japan began creating pretexts to invade Manchuria in Northeast China in 1931. In the July 1931 Wanpaoshan Incident, it sensationalized a minor dispute between Chinese and Korean farmers in order to stir up anti-Chinese sentiment in Korea and Japan. This even led to violent clashes between Koreans and Chinese in their respective countries. On September 18, 1931, the Empire of Japan staged the Liutiaohu incident (bombing of a Manchu railroad) and Mukden Incident, which increased anti-Japanese sentiment amongst the Chinese.

== Lee Bong-chang ==
Lee Bong-chang (1900–1932) was an ethnic Korean born in Korea who lived in Japan between 1925 and 1930. When he first arrived in Japan, Lee saw himself as a "New Japanese" (「신일본인」), and hoped to fit in. He adopted a Japanese name and eventually learned to pass as a Japanese person. At some point, he was arrested and detained for 11 days because he had a letter from a childhood friend written in Korean in his pocket. The experience shocked him, and somewhat soured him on trying to fit in. He continued to work in Japan, but after another incident where he watched a Korean being publicly shamed for being unable to speak Japanese fluently, he decided to join the Korean independence movement.

In late 1930, Lee went to the Korean Provisional Government (KPG) headquarters in Shanghai, China. Lee suggested to a group of Koreans that they should attack the Emperor. Overhearing this suggestion, Kim Ku, a prominent leader in the KPG, took Lee at his word, and recruited him for the attack. To this end, he created the Korean Patriotic Organization (KPO), a militant wing of the KPG.

== Preparation ==
In March 1931, Kim and Lee met in secret. Kim asked Lee about the situation in Japan, and eventually asked if Lee would be willing to return to Japan to assassinate the Emperor. Lee agreed. Kim reportedly then sought out Kim Hong-il, (Note: 김홍일; 金弘壹) an ethnic Korean who served in the Chinese National Revolutionary Army and managed weapons for Shanghai. Together, they theorized that the Emperor would be about 100 metres (330 ft) away from a crowd in public appearances, and that they should use a lighter grenade that could be thrown farther, at the cost of a weaker explosion. (Note: Model called Mami (麻尾).)

Preparation for the attack happened slowly; the KPG was plagued with infighting and poor funding throughout its history. Eventually, by November 1931, Kim managed to acquire everything they needed for the mission. One grenade was acquired from Kim Hong-il. Another grenade, which Lee was to use to commit suicide, was from Chinese military officer Liu Zhi. The funding ($1,000, worth $21,171 in 2025) came from Korean Americans. At a KPG meeting on 6 December, Kim announced the goal of his mission and asked for approval. KPG leaders such as Jo So-ang and Kim Chol were reportedly aghast at the plan, and initially rejected it because they found the mission too expensive and unlikely to succeed. But because everything was already prepared, they eventually relented.

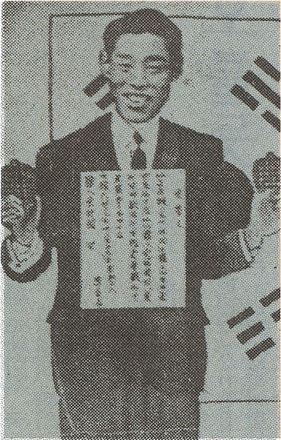
Lee on 13 December 1931

On the 13 December, Lee swore an oath to make the attack on the Japanese Emperor, then took a now famous photo with the grenades and his written oath. On 15 December, Kim gave Lee the two grenades and taught him how to use them. Lee asked if he could test a grenade to see how large the explosion would be, but Kim declined and assured him it would be large. Kim also told Lee to hide the two grenades near his groin while boarding the ship to Japan.

On the 17 December, Lee departed from Shanghai to Kobe, arriving in Tokyo on 22 December. On either the 28th or 29th, Lee saw an article in the Tokyo Asahi Shinbun that said that the Emperor would be present at a public military parade on 8 January 1932, in Yoyogi Park. He decided that that would be the day for the attack. In early January, he sent a telegram to the anxiously waiting Kim with the date.

Lee set about preparing for the attack. Following instructions from Kim, he modified the grenades so that the pin wouldn't need to be pulled out in order to have the grenade detonate; this would make for a quicker attack. On 6 January, he toured the parade venue in advance. He realized that the venue was so large that he wouldn't be able to get close enough for the attack. He changed plans, and decided to attack from the road, when the Emperor was moving.

Around this time, he obtained the business card of a military police officer, which later proved crucial to the attack.

== Assassination attempt ==
At 8:50 am on 8 January 1932, Lee arrived at Harajuku Station. He ate breakfast and inspected the area. He found security to be too tight there, so he took the Tokyo subway to Yotsuya. There, he overheard a newspaper boy saying that the Emperor would not pass through the area, but that he would through Akasaka-mitsuke. At 9:40 am, Lee arrived there only to find that the Emperor had already passed through and gone to the park. He had no choice but to wait until the Emperor returned from the rally. But while trying to pass the time, he missed the Emperor's return trip as well.

Disheartened, Lee asked a railway worker how he could possibly see the Emperor. The railway worker advised him to go to the Sakuradamon gate. He rushed to a taxi and instructed the driver to go as close as possible to the gate. When he disembarked, he attempted to go onto the lawn of the Metropolitan Police Headquarters, but was stopped by police. Lee showed them the business card of the military police officer he had obtained earlier and explained that he just wanted to see the Emperor. They let him through.

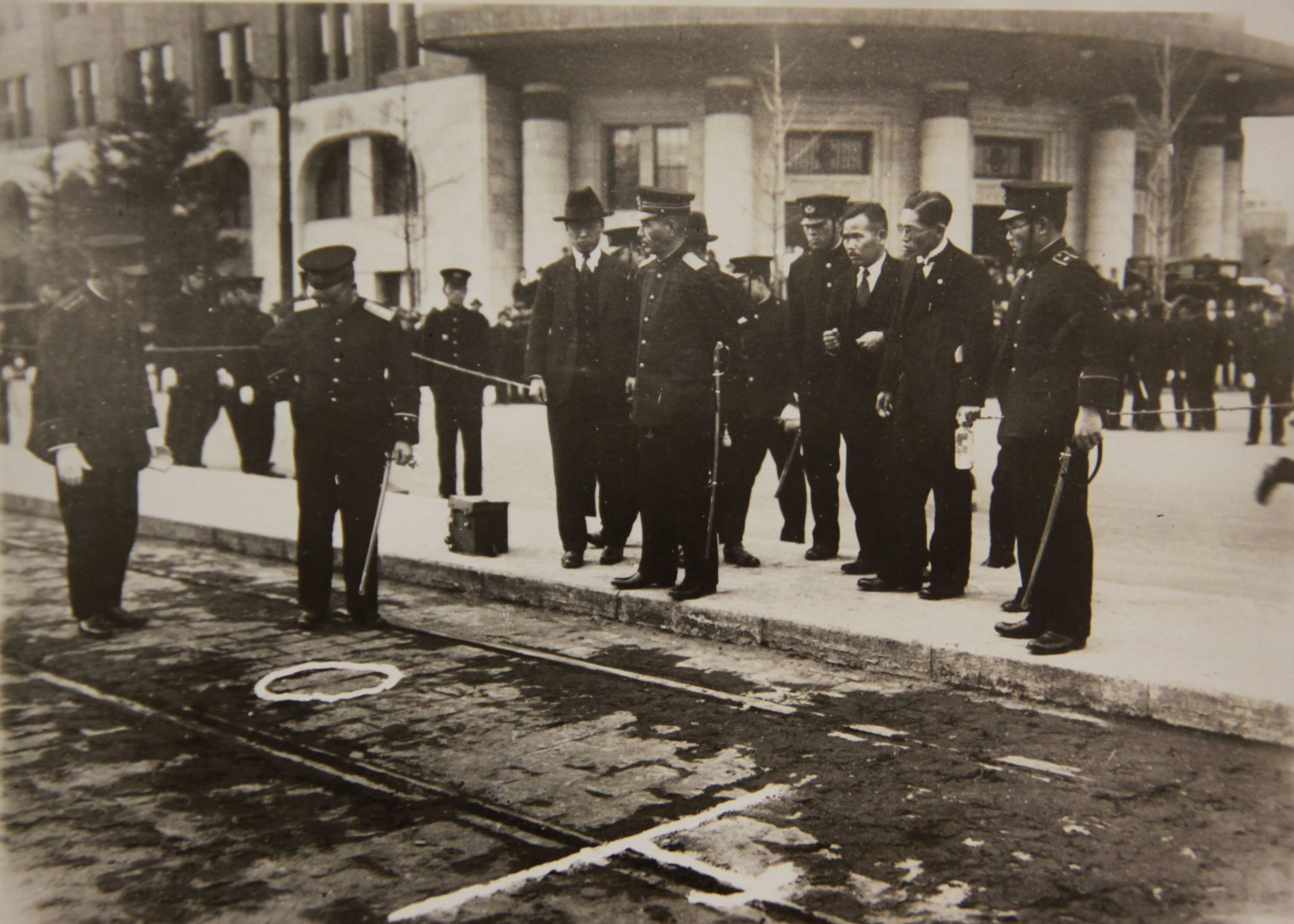
Police gather around a circle marking where the grenade landed, with the Metropolitan Police Headquarters in the background (1932)

He rushed towards a spot closest to the gate, where there was already a crowd of people watching the Emperor, who had just passed by. He squeezed past the crowd, and took a grenade out of his right pocket, and threw it at the procession. It landed on the back of the second horsedrawn carriage. It went off with a weak explosion, and only damaged a small part of the vehicle. No humans were injured. According to Son, Lee later expressed frustration at Kim, as Kim had declined to let him test a grenade earlier. He also later learned that the second carriage did not contain the Emperor, and only contained a Minister of the Imperial Household. He also reportedly forgot to use the second grenade.

== Aftermath ==
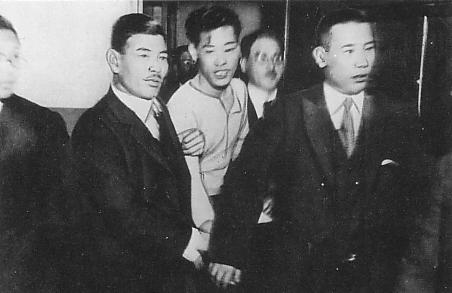
Lee under arrest (8 January 1932)

The police initially tried to arrest the man next to Lee, but Lee voluntarily identified himself as the culprit.

Later, when the Emperor was eating lunch, he was informed of Lee's identity. The Emperor reportedly showed little interest in the incident and said "Ah, he's probably a member of the [Korea] Independence Party!", (Note: 『아, 그는 독립당원이겠지! … 그런데 오늘 오후에 미국대사가 총리대신에게 온다고 했는데, 어떻게 되었나?』) then immediately asked about an unrelated meeting scheduled for that afternoon. (Note: The meeting was related to the Stimson Doctrine that the United States had recently announced.)

The general Japanese public was shocked by the attack. That same day, at 5:12 pm, the Prime Minister Inukai Tsuyoshi accepted responsibility for the conditions that led to the attack, and submitted a letter of resignation to the Emperor, who rejected it, as the Prime Minister had only just formed a cabinet.

During interrogations, Lee confessed that Kim was the mastermind behind the attack. Lee was eventually charged with high treason. (Note: The law defining the charge was introduced in 1907, but only four people were ever charged with it until its abolition in 1947. The three others were Kōtoku Shūsui, Pak Yol, and Daisuke Nanba.) Japanese prosecutors also indicted Kim, and the Supreme Court ordered the Japanese consul-general in Shanghai to bring him to Japan. The Japanese police had already been searching for Kim, and in fact had raided the headquarters of the Shanghai Korean Residents Association (an organization secretly linked to the KPG) a few days before Lee's attack, but did not find Kim or other members of the KPG. They escalated their search, and dispatched investigators from Tokyo to Shanghai. Meanwhile, they also requested help from the French Consulate General, but were rejected.

Kim Ku learned of the attack's outcome the following day, and was reportedly initially extremely disappointed. He was then reassured by others that the attack was significant for harming the image that the Emperor was divine. That same day, Kim was quietly warned by his allies in the French Concession, who had been harboring him against the wishes of Japan, that they would have difficulty protecting him after the attack. He then fled the concession.

Chinese newspapers reported excitedly about the attack and covered it regularly for weeks. They often praised Lee and Koreans in general. Historian Son Sae-il claims this helped alleviate tensions between Koreans and Chinese people. However, the reporting drew criticism from Japanese observers. On 12 January, a group of Japanese protestors in Qingdao went to the office of The Republic Daily News. The disagreement escalated into a riot, which lasted for more than a week and required the intervention of 600 Japanese soldiers from two warships to stop. The newspaper was subsequently discontinued. In Shanghai, a diplomatic row emerged between the Japanese consulate general and the Mayor of Shanghai Wu Tiecheng because of the Chinese praise of the attack.

That day the KPG held an emergency cabinet meeting, where they agreed to have Kim's Korea Independence Party (KIP) publicly accept responsibility for the attack. The KIP published a brief statement through a Chinese newspaper: (Note: 〈본당은 삼가 한국 혁명용사 이봉창이 일본 황제를 저격하는 霹靂一聲(벽력일성)으로 전 세계 피압박 민족에게 신년의 행운을 축복하고, 이것과 같은 소리로 환호하며, 바로 제국주의자의 아성을 향하여 돌격하여, 모든 폭군과 악정치의 首犯을 삼제하고 민족적 자유와 독립의 실현을 도모할 것을 바란다.〉)

This party, through Korean revolutionary warrior Lee Bong-chang's lightning attack on the Japanese Emperor, respectfully wishes the oppressed peoples of the world best wishes in the new year. We hope that, cheering with the same voice, we can charge directly into the stronghold of imperialists, tear down tyrants and aggressors, and bring about national freedom and independence.

The KPO conducted a number of other attacks on Japanese officials, with most being unsuccessful. But three months later, they conducted a successful bombing in Hongkou Park in Shanghai, which killed Japanese General Yoshinori Shirakawa.

== Legacy ==
Lee was posthumously honored by the government of South Korea with the Order of Merit for National Foundation in 1962, and a commemorative postage stamp in 1992. There is a statue of Lee in Hyochang Park in Seoul, South Korea.

== See also ==
- Yun Bong-gil
