= Tsuboi =

Tsuboi (written: 坪井, 壺井 or 壷井) is a Japanese surname. Notable people with the surname include:

- Keisuke Tsuboi (坪井 慶介, born 1979), Japanese footballer
- Sakae Tsuboi (壺井 栄, 1899–1967), Japanese writer and poet
- Shigeji Tsuboi (壺井 繁治, 1897–1975), Japanese poet
- Sho Tsuboi (坪井 翔, born 1995), Japanese racing driver
- Tatsuya Tsuboi (壷井 達也, born 2002), Japanese figure skater
- Tomochika Tsuboi (坪井 智哉, born 1974), Japanese baseball player
- Tomohiro Tsuboi (坪井 智浩, born 1971), Japanese voice actor
- Unoko Tsuboi (壷井 宇乃子, born 1917), Japanese swimmer
