= 1931 Empress of Canada stabbings =

1931 mass stabbing aboard Empress of Canada off Japan

- Location of attack (Japan)
- Location: 34.51°N 145.51°E aboard RMS Empress of Canada, off Japan
- Date: 5 June 1931 c. 9:30 a.m. (UTC+09:00)
- Attack type: Mass stabbing
- Weapon: Pocketknife
- Deaths: 2
- Injuries: 29
- Perpetrator: Graciano Bilas
- Motive: Mental illness

On 5 June 1931, a mass stabbing occurred off the coast of Japan, aboard the Canadian Pacific Steamships liner RMS Empress of Canada. 42-year-old Filipino passenger Graciano Bilas killed two people and wounded 29 others with a knife. Bilas was arrested and brought to Hong Kong, where he was declared insane and committed to a psychiatric hospital.

== Attack ==
At approximately 9:30 a.m. (UTC+09:00) on 5 June 1931, Graciano Bilas, a 42-year-old Filipino steerage passenger, began stabbing people randomly with a pocketknife aboard the Empress of Canada. Bilas, a plantation laborer in Hawaii, had boarded the ship on 29 May to sail to the Philippines. At the time of the attack, the Empress of Canada was en route from Honolulu to Yokohama and was located at 34.51°N 145.51°E. After engaging in a friendly conversation with a Canadian crew member, Bilas stabbed him and two others who happened to be nearby. The assailant continued to attack crew members and passengers, stabbing several from behind in the steerage and alleyways. Crew members searched for half an hour for Bilas before finding him in the ship's bow. He was restrained and arrested, with accounts differing as to whether he surrendered or was forcibly taken into custody. Bilas was kept in the brig under armed guard as the ship sailed to Hong Kong, where he was charged with murder.

== Victims ==
Two Chinese crew members, chief engineer Chan Yue and cabin boy Chan Ching (or Chang Ching), were killed. Twenty-nine others were wounded. As of the day after the attack, eight Japanese and nine Chinese victims were in critical condition, while two Chinese victims were feared to have been fatally wounded. At least four crew members and eleven passengers were stabbed.

== Aftermath ==
=== Legal proceedings ===
In late June 1931, Bilas' trial began in Hong Kong. Despite the high number of casualties, he was only charged with the killing of Chan Yue. The knife used in the attack and a statement made by Bilas were presented as evidence. In the statement, Bilas said that he targeted Japanese passengers because he suspected that they were planning to throw him overboard. The Empress of Canada's surgeon testified that he believed Bilas suffered from manic depressive psychosis, stating that Bilas was incoherent after the attack, refused food and drink, and would stand for hours in one position. In July, Bilas was found insane and committed to a psychiatric hospital.

== See also ==
- List of rampage killers in Asia
