= Hisatoshi Yamazaki =

Japanese field hockey player

Personal information
- Nationality: Japanese
- Born: 14 October 1935 (age 91) Hiroshima, Japan

Sport
- Sport: Field hockey

Hisatoshi Yamazaki (山崎 久寿, Yamazaki Hisatoshi; born 14 October 1935) is a Japanese field hockey player. He competed in the men's tournament at the 1960 Summer Olympics.
