= Miyozo Yamazaki =

Japanese archaeologist (born 1931)

Miyozo Yamazaki (山崎 三四造, Yamazaki Myōzō; born 1931) is a Japanese amateur archaeologist. He reenacted the Jōmon period (the Stone Age in Japan) for 20 years. Yamazaki is well known in Japan since the mass media introduced his Jōmon life. He is now compiling a memoir of his Jōmon life. Yamazaki established a private museum of the Jōmon period at Tsu, Mie Prefecture.
