= Wanpaoshan Incident =

1931 exaggerated Chinese-Korean farmer dispute

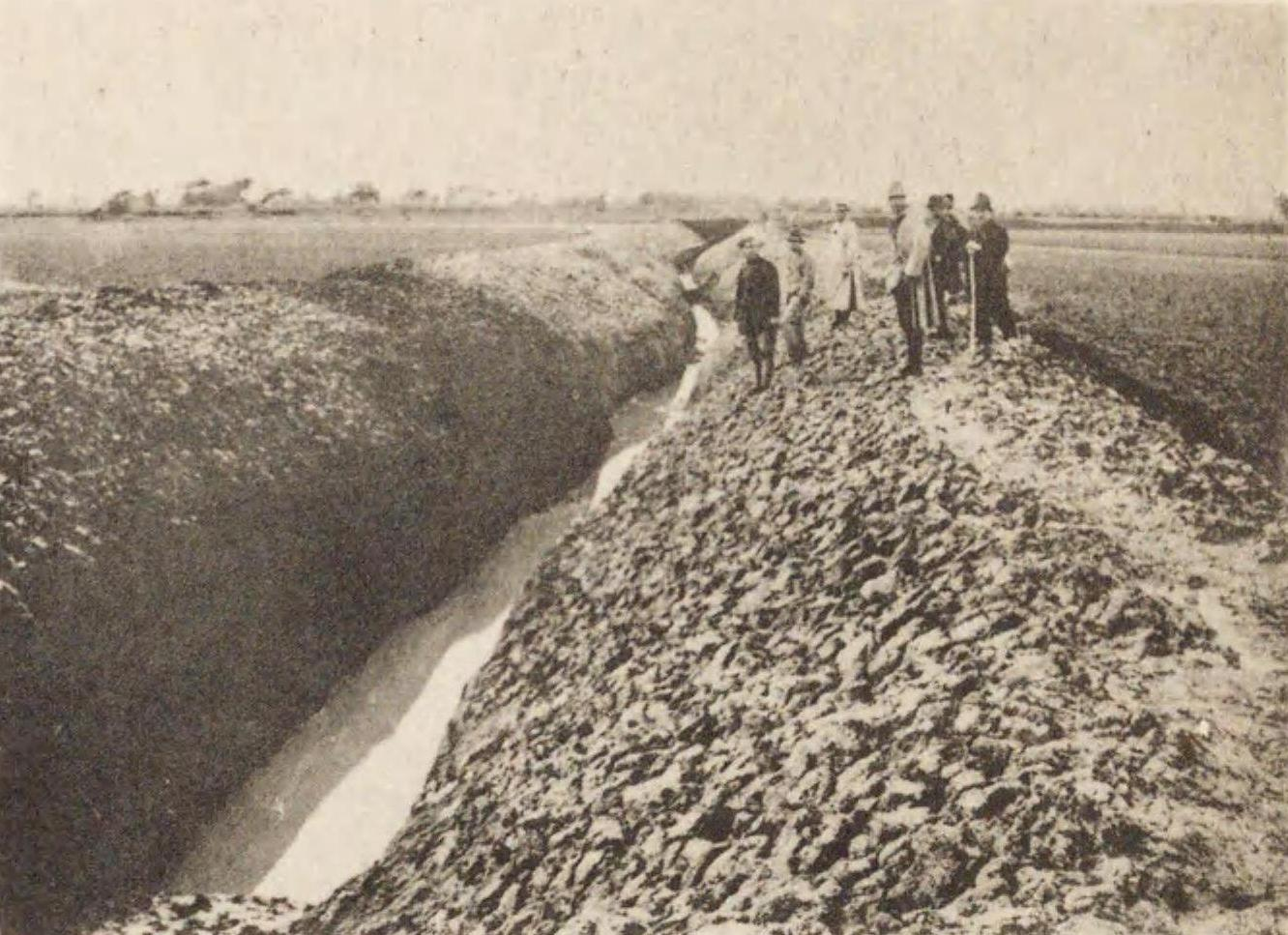
- Irrigation ditch at Wanpaoshan which sparked rioting between Chinese and Korean settlers

Chinese name
- Chinese: 万宝山事件
Transcriptions
Standard Mandarin
- Hanyu Pinyin: Wànbǎoshān Shìjiàn

Korean name
- Hangul: 만보산 사건
- Hanja: 萬寶山事件
Transcriptions
- Revised Romanization: Manbosan Sageon
- McCune–Reischauer: Manbosan Sagŏn

Japanese name
- Kanji: 万宝山事件

The Wanpaoshan Incident (万宝山事件, Manpōzan jiken; Pinyin: Wànbǎoshān Shìjiàn, Korean: 만보산 사건; RR: Manbosan Sageon) was a minor dispute between Chinese and Korean farmers which occurred on 1 July 1931. Through a series of false reports, the issue was highly sensationalized in the Imperial Japanese and Korean press, and used for considerable propaganda effect to increase anti-Chinese sentiment in the Empire of Japan prior to the Japanese invasion of Manchuria.

== Background ==
After the Japanese annexation of Korea in 1910, Japanese migration to Korea started with seizing Korean's farmland through Oriental Development Company. Many displaced Korean farmers had no choice but to migrate to Manchuria, and Japan attempted to use their migration to support its expansion to Manchuria. This led to growing conflict between China and Japan over Koreans in Manchuria.

Wanpaoshan was a small village some 18 miles north of Changchun, in Manchuria, in a low marshy area alongside the Itung river. A group of ethnic Koreans (who were regarded at the time as subjects of the Japanese Empire) subleased a large tract of land from a local Chinese broker and prepared to irrigate by digging a ditch several kilometers long, extending from the Itung river across a tract of land not included in their lease and occupied by local Chinese farmers.

After a considerable length of the ditch had been dug, the Chinese farmers protested to the Wanpaoshan local authorities, who dispatched police and ordered the Koreans to cease construction at once and leave the area. The Imperial Japanese Consul based at Changchun responded by sending Japanese consular police to protect the Koreans, and both Japanese and Chinese authorities in Changchun agreed to a joint investigation.

== Incident ==
Before the joint investigation could be launched, a party of 400 Chinese farmers whose lands were cut by the irrigation ditch, armed with agricultural implements, pikes and handmade guns, drove the Koreans away and filled in much of the ditch. The Japanese consular police took a shooting stance to disperse the mob and to protect the Korean farmers. Both sides stared at each other for about an hour. The Chinese farmers withdrew, and the Japanese police remained on the spot until the Koreans completed the ditch and a dam across the Itung River. Though no Japanese police officer or any Korean were injured, several Chinese farmers were. Several Chinese were captured, but were brought back by Chinese public security officials.

== Provoking anti-Chinese protest in Korea ==
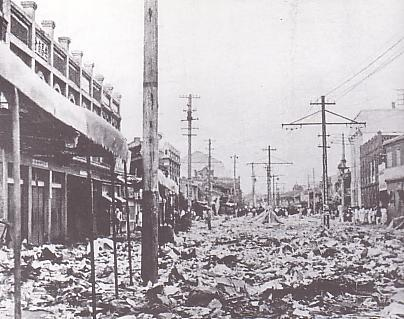
Anti-Chinese riots in Pyongyang, Korea, in the aftermath of the Wanpaoshan Incident

Far more serious than the minor affair between farmers in Manchuria was the public reaction once either false or highly sensationalized accounts of the conflict were published in Japanese and Korean newspapers. After the incident, Japanese authorities had the Chosun Ilbo publish a fabricated report claiming that hundreds of Koreans were killed. A series of anti-Chinese riots erupted throughout Korea, starting at Incheon on July 3. As similar false reports were spread out, riots spread rapidly to other cities on the Korean Peninsula. It was reported that 142 Chinese were killed, 546 wounded, and considerable properties were destroyed. The worst of the rioting occurred in Pyongyang on July 5. The Chinese further denounced Japanese authorities in Korea for not taking adequate steps to protect the lives and property of Chinese residents, and blamed the authorities for allowing inflammatory accounts to be published. The Japanese countered that the riots were a spontaneous outburst that was suppressed as soon as possible and offered compensation for the families of the dead.

== Consequences ==
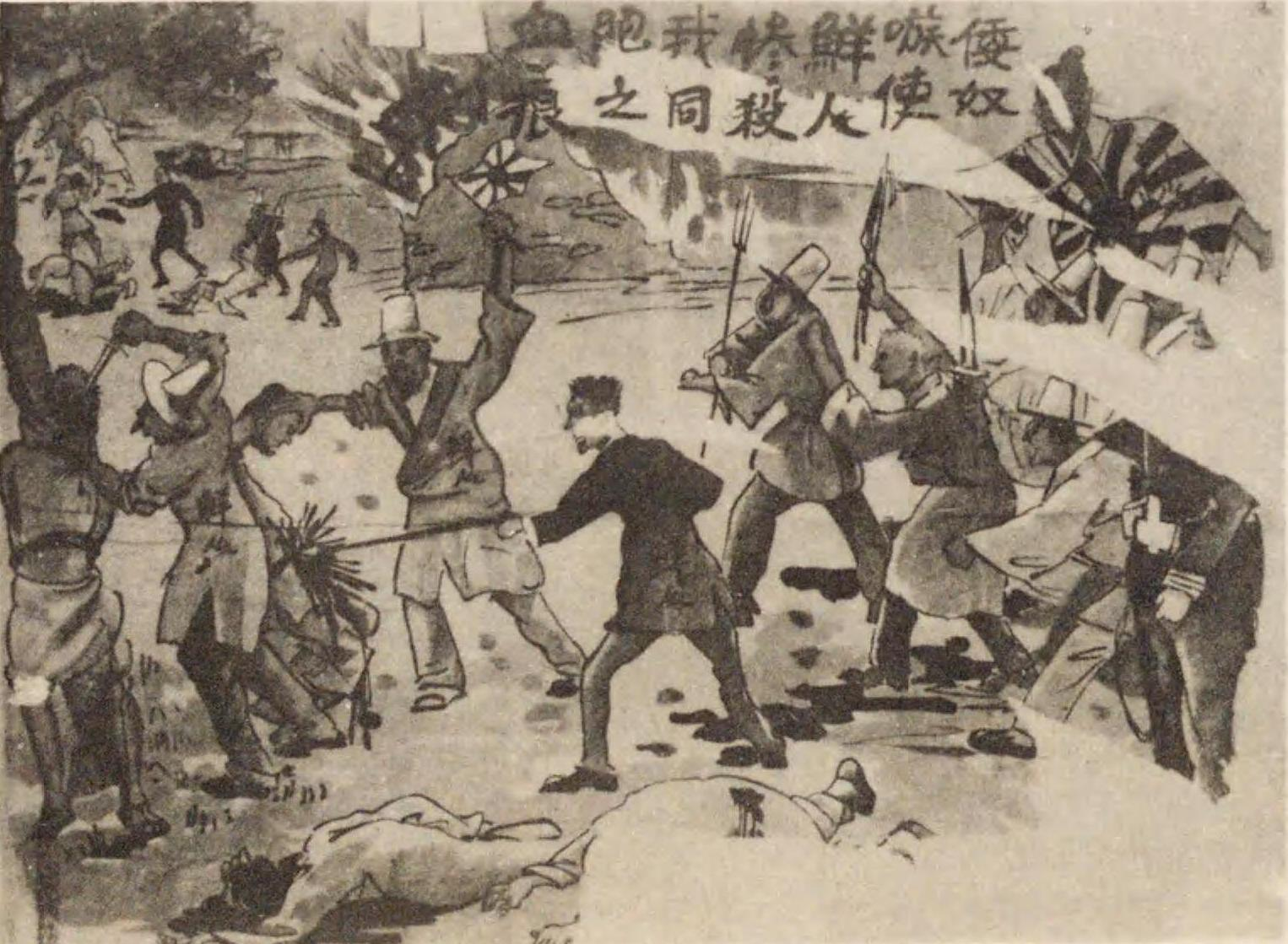
Chinese anti-Japanese poster published after the Wanpaoshan Incident, reading: "Records of Wō slaves driving Koreans to massacre my compatriots"

Negotiations continued between the Japanese and the Chinese authorities to resolve the situation. The Chinese maintained that the Koreans had no right to reside and lease land outside of Gando District, per the terms of the Gando Convention. The Japanese, on the other hand, insisted that Koreans, as Japanese subjects, had the same rights of residing and leasing land throughout South Manchuria as other Japanese. They also held that the Koreans had undertaken their project in good faith and blamed any irregularities on the Chinese broker who arranged the lease. The Japanese eventually withdrew their consular police from Wanpaoshan, but the Koreans remained.

A complete solution of the Wanpaoshan affair had not been reached by September 1931. Propaganda efforts on alleged anti-Korean riots in China continued after the Mukden Incident and the Japanese invasion of Manchuria. According to the New York Times, it was reported in September in Japan that an anti-Korean attack in Sipingjie resulted in the deaths of 300 Koreans. In November, a Japanese commander in Changchun claimed that in Jilin, Chinese rioters massacred 10,000 Koreans and burnt or looted Korean houses all over the province.

== See also ==
- Propaganda in Japan during the Second Sino-Japanese War and World War II
