= Wonju Byun clan =

Korean clan from Gangwon Province

Wonju Byeon or Byun clan
- Country: Korea
- Current region: Wonju
- Founder: An-ryeol (An-yeol) (Hanja: 邊(邉)安烈)
- Connected members: Byun, Sook(邊(邉)肅) Jeonseo Faction; Byun, Anseo (邊(邉)安緖) Saryung Faction; Byun, Ryangbo (邊(邉)良輔) Cheomji, Jeonseo Faction; Byun, Ryanggirl (邊(邉)良傑) Jeongui Faction; Byun, Yijin (邊(邉)以震) Cheomji, Jeonseo Faction; Byun, Heepung ((邉)熙豊) Cheomji, Jeonseo Faction; Byun, Eungzou (邊(邉)應周) Cheomji, Jeonseo Faction; Byun, Baek-hyun; Byun, Woo-seok

The Wonju Byeon or Byun clan (Korean: 원주 변씨; Hanja: 原州 邊(邉)氏) is a Korean clan. Its Bon-gwan (Main Building) is in Wonju, Gangwon Province (historical). According to research in 2015, the clan had 47,804 members. Clan members live on both the Korean Peninsula and in the United States, and their surnames are variously Romanized as Byun, Pyon, and Byeon. The founder of the clan was Byeon or Byun An-ryeol (Anyeol) (변안렬(안열), 邊(邉)安烈, Hanyu Pinyin: Biān Ānliè, 1334-1390), a renowned military general during the late Goryeo Dynasty.

== Origin ==
According to the 『Literary Notes』, the Byeon or Byun clan (邊氏) is a descendant of the royal family of the Yin Dynasty (Dongyi ethnic tribe (東夷族)) Mizhung. During the reign of Duke Pyung (平公) of the Song Dynasty, the Courtesy name (字) of the royal family of Eoyong (御戎) was Byeon or Byun (邊), and the descendants took Euyong's Courtesy name as their surname. Eoyong's surname was Ja (子). Eoyung (禦戎) was a descendant of Mizhung, the son of Jeeul, the 29th king of the Yin Dynasty. Mizhung (微仲) is a member of the royal family of the Yin or Shang Dynasty and the second duke of the Song Dynasty, a feudal lord of Western Zhou. His surname is Ja (子), his clan is Song (宋) and his name is Yeon (衍). He was enshrined in the country of Mi (微) and his Art name is Jungsa (仲思). He is the 15th generation ancestor of Confucius. He is Miza's younger brother and Jeeul's son. Among the literary works concerning surnames, '百家姓' (literally, "The Surnames of the Hundred Families") is a notable example. It is a rhymed text composed during the early Northern Song dynasty. In this work, the Byeon clan (Byeon-ssi) is listed as the 313th entry. For reference, the ethnic groups living to the east of the ancient East Asian continent, other than the Han Chinese, were called Dongyi (東夷族) tribe by the Han Chinese. The Dongyi (東夷族) tribe was also said to include the Nine ethnic groups, and they were also divided into the Yemaek (濊貊族), Malgal (靺鞨族), Han (韓族), Wae (倭族), and Japan (日本). Japan and Wae were different countries before 701. East Asian figures such as Chiyou (蚩尤), Confucius (孔子), and Emperor Shun (舜) were all Dongyi (東夷族) tribe. The dynasty countries of Korean history correspond to the dynasty countries of the Dongyi (東夷族) tribe.

It is difficult to determine with certainty the ethnic affiliation of the Byun lineage in East Asia. Historical records trace their presence back to the Shang dynasty, yet any association with the Dongyi people remains speculative and lacks conclusive evidence. In the early years of the People’s Republic of China, the state, guided by Marxist principles, actively supported the liberation of peoples under imperialist rule. Mao Zedong also advocated for the “right of self-determination” of provincial populations and proposed dividing China into 27 independent states. However, in 1949, although the populations of the Manchu, Mongol, and Han were roughly comparable, approximately 80% of the general populace lacked a clear sense of ethnic identity. The Chinese Communist Party, aiming for national cohesion, incorporated these groups under the designation “Han.” That is, most of the 91% of China’s population counted as Han were artificially formed as a category for political reasons after 1948, and do not represent the historical Han. Consequently, the Han came to constitute an overwhelming majority, making the task of tracing the precise ethnic origins of the Byun lineage an increasingly complex scholarly challenge. However, from a historical and long-term perspective, the criteria by which the Han Chinese and Koreans view ‘ethnicity’ were fundamentally different. In Korea, the concept of ethnicity has traditionally, and even to the present, been based primarily on bloodlines and ancestral connections, focusing on whether individuals share the same ancestors or are distant relatives. In contrast, from the Han Chinese perspective, ethnicity has long been defined based on shared culture and regional identity - a person could become Han simply by sharing the culture. For example, someone who was born and lived in Busan for 20 years and then spent 25 years in Seoul would still be considered a Busan native from a Korean viewpoint, but from the Han Chinese perspective, they would be regarded as a Seoul native. This illustrates that even for the same individual, the determination of ‘ethnicity’ depends on the perspective taken, showing that traditional Korean and Han Chinese concepts of ethnicity were fundamentally different. Therefore, the current efforts to relocate Han Chinese to the Uyghur region and ‘Sinicize’ them differ fundamentally from the historical Han Chinese understanding of ethnicity. By the earlier standard, even the Han Chinese who moved to the Uyghur region should be considered part of the Uyghur ethnicity.

In the case of Joseon society, particularly in the late Joseon period following the Imjin War, the state’s fiscal difficulties and socio-economic transformations led to the widespread proliferation of practices such as purchasing government posts or social status through maegwanmaejik and nabsok, falsifying genealogical records, or paying money to have one’s name inserted into a clan registry. These phenomena can be regarded as cases in which individuals or groups without surnames sought upward social mobility by artificially acquiring a surname through economic means. By contrast, in the People’s Republic of China in 1948, the Communist Party, as part of its strategy for national integration, artificially adjusted the reported proportion of Han Chinese from less than 10 percent to over 90 percent, thereby manufacturing demographic uniformity. Within this comparative framework, it may be observed that in Joseon society, where originally only about 2 percent of the population possessed surnames, the proportion expanded to approximately 65 percent. This development ultimately explains why, in contemporary South Korea, nearly 40 percent of the population bears the surnames Kim, Lee, or Park. Notably, more than 95 percent of these surname groups - including the representative surnames Kim, Lee, and Park - emerged as newly constructed lineages in and around the eighteenth century and lack direct genealogical continuity with pre-eighteenth-century surname groups.

The following is recorded in the "Wonju Byun Clan Cheomchugongpa (原州邊(邉)氏 僉樞公派 Duke Cheomchu faction) Geochonmunjungbo (巨村門中譜 Genealogy of Geochonmu faction) Literature Collection".The Wonju Byun clan is said to have originated in Longxi (농서隴西), Dingxi (定西), Gansu Province (甘肅省)] on the East Asian continent. During the Former Han dynasty (202 BCE–25 CE), Tong Byun (변통邊通 Bian Tong) rose to prominence. In the Eastern Han dynasty (25–220 CE), Bung Byun (변붕邊鳳 Bian Feng), Governor of Jingzhao (京兆尹); Yang Byun (변양邊讓 Bian Rang), Governor of Jiujiang (九江太守); and So Byun (변소邊韶 Bian Shao), Minister of the Imperial Secretariat (尙書令), were all noted as natives of Chenliu Commandery (陳留郡), which was located southeast of present-day Kaifeng (開封市), Henan Province (河南省). The Biography of Dong Zhuo (董卓傳) also mentions Jang Byun (변장邊章 Bian Zhang), who was from Jincheng (金城) in Gansu Province. During the Wei, Jin, and Northern and Southern Dynasties period (221–589), many members of the Byun family lived in the Jincheng area, and some later moved to the neighboring Longxi Commandery (隴西郡). Yang Byun (변양邊讓 Bian Rang), Governor of Jiujiang during the Later Han dynasty, was known for his exceptional talent. According to his biography, he aroused the jealousy of Cao Cao (조조曹操, 155–220) and was ultimately executed. Because he was killed while serving as Governor of Jiujiang, he came to be remembered by the title “Governor of Jiujiang.” In addition, the Miscellaneous Records (雜錄) states: “During the reign of Emperor Xuan of the Han dynasty (漢宣祖), Minister of Rites Gihu Byun (변기후邊基厚 Bian Jihou) said that all members of the Byun clan on the East Asian continent and beyond are descendants of Yang Byun (변양邊讓 Bian Rang). Soon Byun (변순邊順 Bian Shun) is also a descendant of Yang Byun (변양邊讓 Bian Rang).” Information about Yang Byun (邊讓 Bian Rang) can be found in the book Sesol Sineo Seonghwi Unbun (世說新語姓彙韻分).

== Clan founder ==
Byeon or Byun An-ryeol (Anyeol) was born in April 1334 in Shenyang in present-day China’s Liaoning Province. His ancestor, Byeon or Byun Ryeo (변려, 邊(邉)呂), was a naturalized resident of Hwangju County in present-day North Korea’s North Hwanghae Province during the North Song Dynasty in China. Ryeo is a progenitor of Hwangju Byeon or Byun. Byeon Byun An-ryeol (Anyeol)’s grandfather, Byeon Sun or Byun Soon (변순, 邊(邉)順), returned to China (At that time, the name China was not the name of a country, but meant the central continent.) in 1268 to be appointed by the Yuan Dynasty as a high official of 1,000 households (Chinese: 千户侯) in Shenyang. Byeon Sun or Byun Soon was a great-great-grandchild of Byeon or Byun Ryeo (변려, 邊(邉)呂), and Byeon or Byun Ryeo was a son of Byeon Yo or Byun Hyun.

In 1352, Byeon or Byun An-ryeol (Anyeol) entered Goryeo by accompanying Princess Noguk with Byun, Sook (변숙, 邊(邉)肅) and Byun, Anseo, an ethnic Mongol princess (Yuan dynasty) that became queen of Goryeo by marriage to Goryeo King Gongmin, as her fatherly master. Sook is the second son of Anyeol's older brother, Anbaek(邊(邉)安伯)], and Anseo is Anyeol's half-brother. Because of his exploits during a punitive military expedition he carried out in Jeju Island along with fellow Goryeo general Ch'oe Yŏng, he was commended during the reign of King U of Goryeo. In 1361, Byeon led his forces in routing the anti-Yuan Red Turban rebels on the battlefield and was promoted for his accomplishments. In 1374, he joined fellow Goryeo general Yi Seong-gye in successfully repulsing Japanese pirates and was rewarded with a prestigious title.

On January 16, 1390, Byeon was executed after the Goryeo bureaucrat and politician Kim Jeo implicated him in an unclear confession in a plot to restore King U to the throne after he was deposed by Yi. His family members were pardoned. Yi ascended to the throne in 1392 and established the Joseon Dynasty.

The Tomb of Daeeun Byeon or Byun An-ryeol(Anyeol) is located in the town of Jingeon in Namyangju, Gyeonggi Province, South Korea. On September 2, 2002, the tomb was designated Gyeonggi Province Cultural Material No. 116.

Byeon or Byun was portrayed by South Korean actor Song Geum-sik in the 2014 South Korean television series Jeong Dojeon.

== History and surname ==
The history of the Byeon or Byun clan in Korean history began with the Jangyeon Byeon or Byun clan (Hamgyong Province around 1100), whose progenitor was Yooyeong during the Goryeo Dynasty. Ryeo is the 5th generation of the Jangyeon Byeon or Byun clan, and continues through the Hwangju Byeon or Byun clan (Hwanghae Province around 1200), which has Ryeo as its progenitor. And An-ryeol (Anyeol) is the 8th generation of the Hwangju Byeon or Byun clan, and continues to the Wonju Byeon or Byun clan (Gangwon Province around 1300), which has An-ryeol (Anyeol) as its progenitor. From An-yeol (Anyeol)'s grandfather, An-yeol (Anyeol) held official positions and lived in the Yuan Dynasty. An-yeol (Anyeol), the 8th generation of the Hwangju Byeon or Byun clan, moved to Goryeo. Around 1100, after winning the war against the Khitan, Goryeo had the highest diplomatic status among Goryeo, Song, and Khitan. According to records (Wonju Byun Clan Genealogy and the Family Records, Gaseung, of the Duke Jeonseo Faction of Wonju Byun), the progenitor of the Hwangju Byeon or Byun clan, Ryeo, fled the Jin Dynasty to Goryeo from the Song Dynasty. The area was not the Korean Peninsula today, but the Qingyu (靑嶼) region] of Zhejiang Province (浙江省), south of Shanghai, China. It may therefore be inferred that, around the year 1100 when Ryeo migrated from the Song dynasty to Goryeo, the territorial domain of Goryeo, as recorded in historical sources, was not limited to the Korean Peninsula as is conventionally understood today, but extended into areas corresponding to present-day eastern China.

When examining the migration patterns of the Byeon or Byun family, it appears that they generally sought to align themselves with the major powers of East Asia. Soon Byeon or Byun, the grandfather of An-ryeol (Anyeol) Byeon or Byun and the progenitor of the Wonju Byeon or Byun clan, moved to the Yuan dynasty, which was stronger than Goryeo at the time, and served in official posts there. When the Yuan began to decline, An-ryeol (Anyeol) Byeon or Byun returned to Goryeo. Likewise, Yooyeong Byeon or Byun of the Jangyeon Byeon or Byun clan and Ryeo Byeon or Byun of the Hwangju Byeon or Byun clan are believed to have migrated to Goryeo - then stronger than the Song dynasty - where they entered government service and settled. However, the reason the ancestor did not migrate from Joseon to another country seems to be that, unlike in earlier times when they moved from the Song to the powerful Goryeo and later from Goryeo to the powerful Yuan, they did not regard the Ming or Qing dynasties as superior powers to Joseon. Therefore, it is presumed that the ancestor saw no particular advantage or benefit in migrating. The difference in national power between Goryeo and the Song dynasty at the time our ancestors settled is well illustrated in the historical drama Justice Bao (Bao Qingtian). Historically, during the Song dynasty, counterfeit goods were widespread, which made the higher-quality products from Goryeo more preferred. Today, most products are manufactured in the People’s Republic of China, whose goods dominate the global market thanks to overwhelming price competitiveness. However, many Chinese-made products are used only once. While some interpret this as an intentional commercial strategy, a more convincing explanation is that the production approach prioritizes the manufacturer’s profit over the user’s well-being, reflecting a lack of craftsmanship and moral consideration.

The ancestors of the Wonju Byun clan migrated during the height of Goryeo’s power, but with the fall of Goryeo and the transition to the Joseon dynasty, they could no longer maintain their status as officials of a great power and instead continued their lineage in Joseon, whose national strength was comparatively weaker. Joseon, having begun without a firmly established founding legitimacy, failed to pursue diversified diplomacy and became excessively dependent on Ming, which had supported its founding. As a result, the dynasty repeatedly suffered foreign invasions, and the lives of its people grew increasingly impoverished. Even under such circumstances, the state prioritized formal justification over practical benefit, while officials deepened structural limitations through self-interest. Nevertheless, the descendants of the Byun clan rendered distinguished service during the Imjin War (1592-1598 Japanese Invasion) and the Manchu invasions (1527 Jurchen Invasion), and endured the severe hardships of the Gyeongshin famine (1670-1671) and the Eulbyeong famine (1695-1699), preserving their lineage across generations.

Since most ancestors of the Wonju Byun clan lived during the Joseon dynasty, it is necessary to examine the history of that period. However, before understanding Joseon history, one must also consider the broader context of the East Asian continent. In addition, because some ancestors lived during the Goryeo dynasty, Goryeo history also serves as an important point of reference. However, the historical records of the Goryeo dynasty were destroyed in the early Joseon period for political purposes, and only histories recompiled from the Joseon perspective have survived. Therefore, the Goryeo histories handed down to us today cannot be regarded as free from possible distortion. The Goryeosa compiled during the Goryeo period was ordered to be discarded by Yi Seong-gye, and the version that was later recompiled from the Joseon perspective contains aspects of factual distortion and biased interpretation. This Goryeosa was completed in the first year of Munjong’s reign (1451), spanning from Yi Seong-gye through Jeongjong, Taejong, and Sejong. During Sejong’s reign, figures such as Kim Jong-seo, Jeong In-ji, and Yi Seon-je played central roles in leading its compilation. In other words, Yi Seong-gye, Yi Bang-won, and Sejong contributed to the historical distortion. Furthermore, during the Joseon Dynasty, historical records were subject to territorial distortions; specifically, works such as the 'Dongguk Jiriji'] (Geography of the Eastern Kingdom—compiled and published during the reign of King Seonjo) served to reframe the history of preceding eras into a narrative centered exclusively on the Korean Peninsula.

The East Asian continent has long been a space where countless nations and peoples, each with distinct histories, waged continuous wars for supremacy. Unlike Korean history, where the lineage of a single nation carried on, in East Asia, new states with different histories repeatedly rose and fell. This pattern resembles the structure of European history, in which many states experienced cycles of rise and decline. However, while Europe eventually developed the concept of modern nation-states as countries remained divided, East Asia ultimately saw the emergence of a single empire that unified the continent. That empire was the Qing dynasty, founded by the Jurchens who originated in Manchuria. If the Roman Empire had maintained its maximum territorial extent and transitioned into the modern era, large parts of Europe and North Africa might have remained a single Roman state, much like the Qing Dynasty in China. The empire's territory included what are now Italy, Spain, France, southern England, Portugal, Greece, Turkey, Albania, Egypt, Libya, Algeria, Tunisia, and Morocco. An example of historical distortion is as follows. The progenitor of the Wonju Byun clan migrated from the Yuan dynasty to Goryeo during the Goryeo period. Some records include the Yuan dynasty within Chinese history, but this is inaccurate. According to Goryeo historical sources, the name ‘Mongol’ was used prior to 1271, and the dynastic title was changed to ‘Yuan’ thereafter. Thus, the Yuan dynasty was, in essence, the same state as the Mongol Empire, with only its name altered. To deny that China's history begins with the Qing dynasty and instead claim that the Song dynasty should be included as part of Chinese history is no different from saying that just because people with Native American ancestry live in the United States today, Native American history is therefore the ancient history of the United States.

It is necessary to clarify the meaning of the term "Zhongguo (中國)" here. In fact, "Zhongguo" and the "Central Plain" originally carried the same meaning. The name "Zhongguo," as we use it today, was not originally intended to refer to a specific state. It was first used as a formal state name during the Qing dynasty, and at that time, it did not signify a territorial state in the modern sense but rather the “center of the world.” For people of that era, East Asia was understood as the world itself, and constant conflicts arose as powers competed to control the most central and fertile lands.

Goryeo regarded itself as an imperial state and governed its realm through multiple vassal states. In contrast, Joseon, having received support from the Ming dynasty during its founding, sought to repay this favor by adopting a worldview in which the Ming was considered the “center of the world” in East Asia, positioning itself within that order while maintaining a state system dependent on Ming support. At the same time, Joseon maintained an exclusive stance toward other contemporary powers. However, after the fall of the Ming dynasty, Joseon could no longer belong to the continental order. Instead, it sought to maintain its national identity by positioning itself as the central state within the Korean Peninsula and regarding itself as a core power in East Asia. This approach ultimately left Joseon less autonomous than Goryeo and contributed to the Japanese invasions and the historical stain of the Japanese colonial period. Thus, Joseon’s choices and attitudes left a deep sense of regret in Korean history, highlighting the limits of its statecraft and the consequences of diplomatic dependence. From an objective perspective, thanks to a fortunate alignment of historical circumstances, Joseon was able to experience the period of Japanese colonial rule in the early 20th century and ultimately achieve national independence through the will and actions of its people. However, had such events occurred 500 years earlier, modern concepts such as “colonial occupation” or “independence” would not have been applicable, and Joseon would likely have been absorbed under Japanese rule. As a result, the history preceding Joseon would also have been largely erased from both records and collective memory, and the dynasty could be seen as having effectively obliterated Korean history. Meanwhile, the wars fought by Goryeo and Joseon were not against nations founded by the Han Chinese, but rather against nations established by the descendants of Gojoseon. In simpler terms, they were wars fought among distant descendants of a common ancestor. To put it simply, it would not be an exaggeration to say that it was a fight between distant descendants of the same ancestors, or in other words, distant relatives. However, during the early period of the Ming dynasty, which was founded by the Red Turban rebels - a band of outlaws who wore red headbands - a war involving Han Chinese forces ensued. The dynastic states established by the Han people on the East Asian continent had no historical continuity with one another. Since the concept of “colonies” did not exist as it does today, each newly founded dynasty should be regarded as the history of a different people or a separate nation.

In Korean history, the Joseon dynasty justified its founding - despite being established through rebellion without legitimate cause - by deliberately downplaying and minimizing the territorial extent of the preceding Goryeo dynasty. Later, during the Japanese colonial period, such distortions were further intensified under the influence of colonial historiography, which erased much of East Asia's continental history and confined Korea’s historical narrative to the Korean Peninsula. The real issue is that generations educated under this distorted historical view - shaped during the colonial era - still form the mainstream understanding of Korean history today. As of 2025, Korean culture is widely recognized around the world. However, most of the globally known cultural elements are based on the Joseon dynasty. It is a regrettable reality that, despite all earlier Korean dynasties being far more brilliant and flourishing than Joseon, it is Joseon culture that has come to represent Korea internationally.

In Korean history, the genealogy of the Wonju Byun clan begins with the Goryeo period, so events preceding that era are generally not discussed. However, one can consider the perspective from which history is approached. It is often said that a nation’s history is recorded based on its present-day territory, but this perspective is limited and not always accurate. The People’s Republic of China intermittently asserts that Goguryeo and Baekje should be incorporated into its own history. This claim arises from the fact that both kingdoms possessed territories spanning the Korean Peninsula and the eastern regions of the East Asian continent. However, the PRC seeks to obscure the reality that these were independent states with distinct histories and identities by classifying them as minority groups or local regimes. Externally, such narratives are used as propaganda, while internally, they serve as tools of social control and ideological indoctrination. The very notion of a “local regime” is inherently inadequate for describing states that possessed their own ethnic identities and historical traditions. In reality, Goguryeo and Baekje endured for more than 700 years, forming a central pillar of the East Asian political order, whereas without exception, all contemporary continental states were short-lived, with none lasting beyond 300 years and many surviving only 10 to 20 years. Thus, the so-called “local regime theory” is nothing more than a political and academic discourse devised to legitimize territorial claims, functioning as a conceptual device that distorts historical reality.

The Wonju Byun clan continued its lineage even in the absence of direct descendants, sometimes through adoption. From a modern standpoint, whether adopted parents should be considered the “true” parents, or whether biological parents who provided one’s genes should hold that status, is a matter of personal judgment. However, if adopted parents are not recognized as true parents, the ancestors recorded in a genealogy may not correspond to reality, thereby undermining the meaning of the genealogy itself.

Korean history begins with Gojoseon (Ancient Joseon). The kingdom of Buyeo succeeded Gojoseon, while Goguryeo and Baekje inherited Buyeo’s legacy. The successor state of Silla, however, is not clearly defined. The Goryeo dynasty succeeded Silla’s territory and people but identified itself as the legitimate heir of Goguryeo. In contrast, the Jurchen-founded Qing dynasty claimed to be the successor of Silla. Today’s People’s Republic of China and the Republic of China (Taiwan) both trace their political lineage back to the Qing dynasty. According to the Imperially Commissioned Comprehensive Manchu Genealogy (欽定滿洲源流考) and other Qing historical records, the Qing royal family was described as descendants of the Silla people. In dynastic systems, the royal bloodline was considered more important than the common populace. Many so-called “Han” dynasties in East Asia had rulers of Han origin, yet their populations were often composed largely of non-Han peoples. Thus, if we judge by the standard of the Manchu Genealogy (欽定滿洲源流考), modern China could be seen as a descendant of Silla. The Joseon dynasty succeeded Goryeo, and modern Korea (the Republic of Korea) succeeded Joseon. During the later period of Silla, the kingdom occupied parts of Goguryeo and Baekje’s territories, and its people were a mix of early Silla natives, Baekje subjects, and some from Goguryeo. Since Goryeo, which followed Silla, saw itself as the successor of Goguryeo, many Koreans today can be viewed as descendants of Silla while simultaneously inheriting the spirit and traditions of Goguryeo. In other words, Korea is the descendant of both Silla and Goguryeo. However, from a genealogical perspective, Koreans are more accurately the descendants of Goguryeo than of Silla.

For reference, although the word “Han” in Han Dynasty (漢) and Hanguk (韓國, Korea) is pronounced the same in Korean, their meanings and origins are completely different. The “Han (漢)” in Han Dynasty refers to the name of an ancient state in East Asia, whereas the “Han (韓)” in Hanguk was a character used to represent a native Korean sound. Its original meaning corresponds to “Khan” or “Han,” a title signifying a ruler or emperor. The word 'Han' is also used to mean 'great' or 'large.' For example, 'Hangang' (the Han River) means 'a big and wide river,' where 'Han (漢)' is a Sino-Korean character that carries the meaning of greatness or largeness. In this way, 'Han' conveys a sense of scale or grandeur. Similarly, the name of the country, 'Daehan Minguk' (Republic of Korea), is formed by combining 'Daehan (大韓),' meaning 'great Korea' or 'great nation,' and 'Minguk (民國),' meaning 'a nation ruled by the people. It leads one to reflect on the meaning of Hanja for the Korean people. Throughout Korean history, Hanja has long been used as the writing system to represent the native Korean language. The so-called “Hanja cultural sphere” - comprising today’s People’s Republic of China, Vietnam, Korea, and Japan — formed the world of East Asia before contact with the West. However, Taiwan (Republic of China) was not part of the Hanja cultural sphere before the Ming dynasty. Just as Western civilizations used the alphabet to record their own languages, the nations of East Asia, each with its own distinct history, used Hanja as a script — much like an alphabet — to write their unique languages. Although they shared the same written characters, the ancestors of Korea and Japan employed completely different grammar and word order to express their respective languages. Today, China calls it Hanzi (汉字), Korea calls it Hanja (漢字), Japan calls it Kanji (漢字), and Vietnam calls it Chữ Hán. Yet none of these nations refer to it as “Chinese characters,” because each used the script as a unique system to express its own language. Vietnam replaced Chữ Hán with the Latin alphabet after 1945, and Korea, since the mid-1970s, has gradually reduced Hanja education, moving toward a Hangul-centered writing system. However, Hanja remains an essential script for understanding Korean history and ancestry. More than 60% of the Korean vocabulary is derived from Hanja. Thus, Hanja continues to be a vital part of the Korean language and cultural identity — and it is important that younger generations remember it as our own script.

While some people may place importance on bloodline, many value succession - the inheritance of meaning, tradition, and culture - more highly. An adopted child inherits the family traditions and customs of the adoptive parents, and in some cases, this form of succession can exert a stronger influence than biological lineage. Ultimately, whether one emphasizes succession or bloodline when viewing history is a matter of personal judgment. A survey of human history shows that wars have often been caused by religious or ideological reasons, and conflicts driven by ideology continue to this day. In this context, faith and succession have been - and remain - highly significant factors in human society, reflecting the essential nature of human history.

The progenitor of the Jangyeon Byeon or Byun clan, Yooyeong's father was Yeon, his grandfather was Joongryang, his great-grandfather was Kyung, and his great-great-grandfather was Ang. Ang served as Deasado of the Song Dynasty, Kyung served as Munhaseubsihu of the Song Dynasty and Daeahchan of Silla, Joongryang served as a Pyeongjangsa of the Song Dynasty, and Yeon served as Byungbusangseo of the Song Dynasty. Yooyeong served as Pandongseo of the Song Dynasty and Jungmunjihu of Goryeo.

The genealogy of the Wonju Byun clan can also be regarded as the history of a single family - or even a single lineage. All historical records are often written from the perspective of the victors or recorders, which means that only favorable accounts are preserved, while inconvenient or undesirable events are often omitted or distorted. Although historical perspectives may change over time, true history can only be understood by interpreting it within the ideas and values of the era in which it took place. Forcing modern concepts or standards onto the past only distorts historical truth. Furthermore, when history is reshaped for political purposes, it ceases to be history - it becomes fiction. For example, there have been cases where the separate and unrelated histories of many different nations were artificially combined, for political reasons, into a single narrative called “Chinese history.” This is a representative example of how the complex world history of the East Asian continent has been distorted into the history of a single people or nation.

The Hwangju Byun clan (c. 1200) and the Wonju Byun clan (c. 1300) can be seen as direct descendants from the same bloodline. However, the case of Yooyeong Byun, founder of the Jangyeon Byun clan, and Ryeo Byun, founder of the Hwangju Byun clan, is different. Yooyeong Byun came from the Song dynasty and settled in Goryeo, where his descendants established roots. In contrast, although Ryeo Byun is said to be a descendant of Yooyeong Byun, he was a native of Song who later naturalized in Goryeo. Thus, it is difficult to view him as being directly connected to the Jangyeon lineage. For reference—as noted in the 'Japrok' (雜錄 Miscellaneous Records)—Cheongseo (靑嶼)— the region from which Chungje Byun (邊沖悌), his son Hyun Byun (邊玄 also known as Yo Byun (邊幺)), and his grandson Ryeo Byun (邊呂) migrated from Song Dynasty to Goryeo Dynasty around the year 1200 to escape the Jin Dynasty—is a locality situated near present-day Ningbo City (寧波市) in Zhejiang Province (浙江省), People's Republic of China. Both the 'Japrok (雜錄)' and various clan genealogies consistently record this region as Goryeo territory, lying within the nation's borders at that time. This period spans the years 1194 to 1260—the era following the fall of the Northern Song and the establishment of the Southern Song—and corresponds to the reigns of the Southern Song emperors Ningzong (寧宗 1194–1224) and Lizong (理宗 1224–1264), as well as the Goryeo emperors Huijong (熙宗 1204–1211), Gangjong (康宗 1211–1213), and Gojong (高宗 1213–1259).

The following is about the letters of Byun(邉). If you look for information on this character, Byun (邉), it is said that Byun (邉) is a ‘Different Shape Letter’ of Byun (邊), and it is common to use a ‘Different Shape Letter’ in East Asia. This character, Byun (邊), means the edge or side, and is also used as a surname. The reason why ‘Different Shape Letters’ are used is that they are used when a certain letter has several meanings and one of them is emphasized. Surname, Byun (邉) is composed of four letters as follows. First, Baek (白) is 'white color' (or Ja自is ‘self’), Second, shaved head (冖) is 'a symbol representing a distinct shape', Third, In (儿) is 'the appearance of a child', and Fourth, gu (口) has the meaning of 'entrance or mouth'. It (辶) is meaningless because it is a way to organize and arrange the character. When these four are combined, it becomes a character that means 'The Appearance of a Person with a Pure and Clean Heart'.

== Factions or Branches of Wonju Byun ==
Factions were created based on the official positions of each descendant.

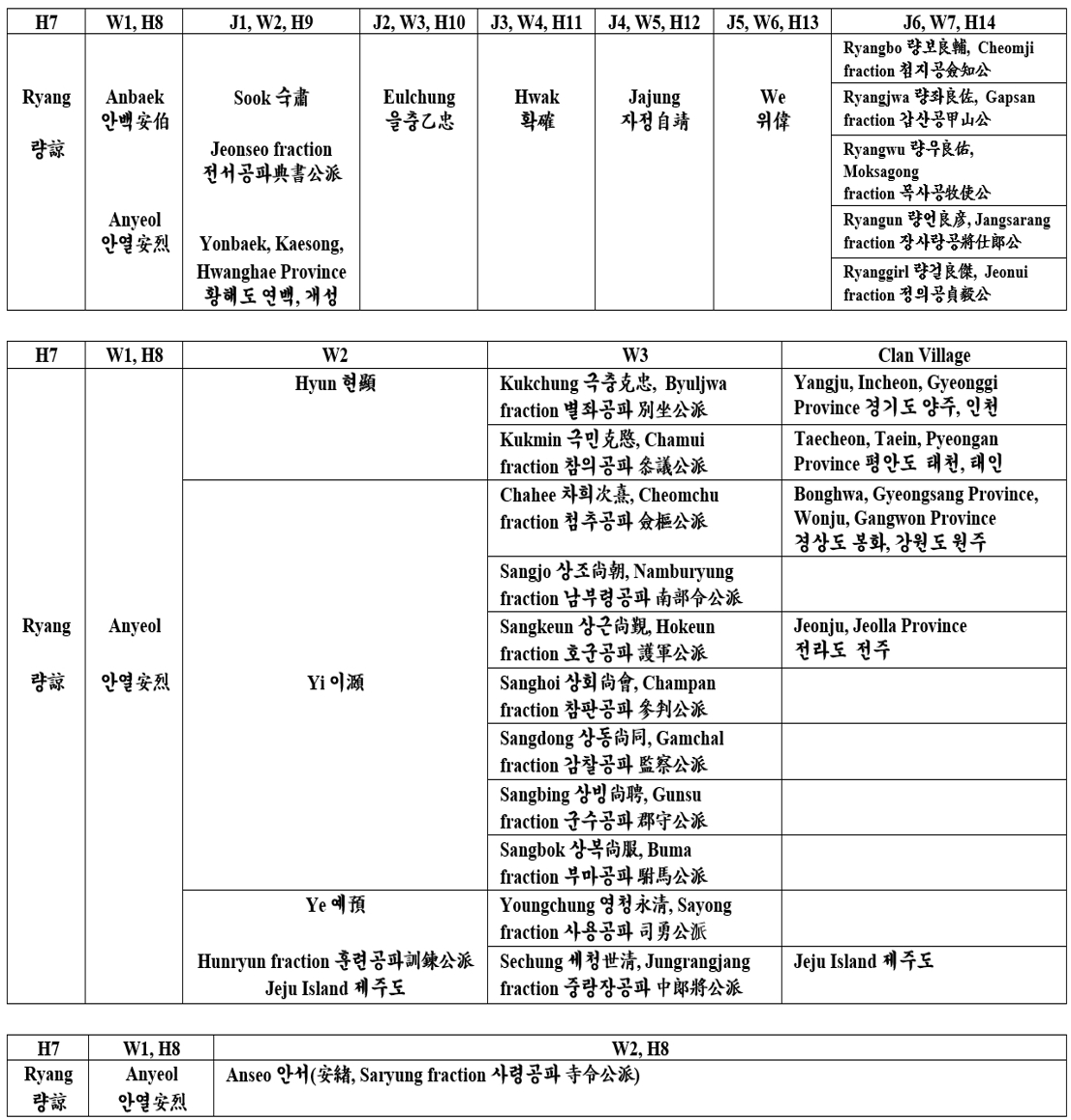

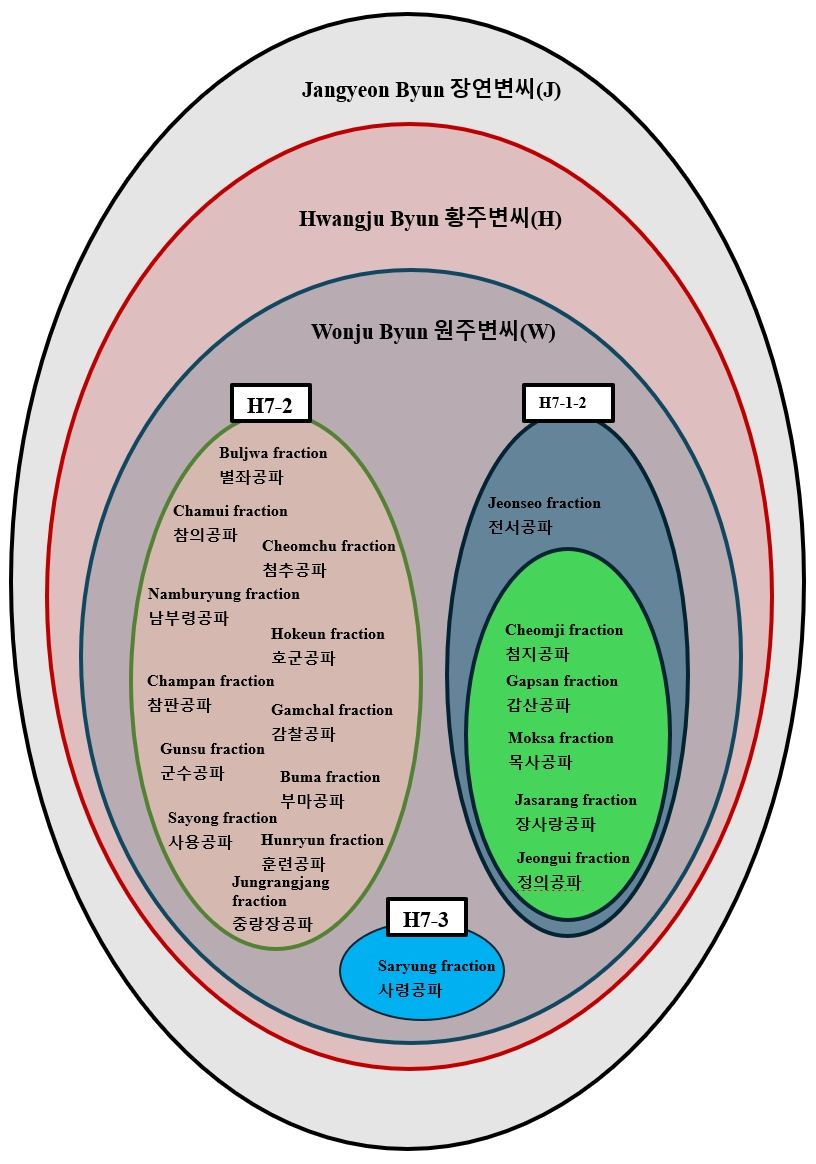

For example, Byun, Sook (邊(邉)肅) is the father of the Duke Jeonseo faction (典書公派). His official position was Hobujeonseo (戶部典書 currently ministerial level) of Gajeongdaebu (嘉靖大夫) during the Goryeo Dynasty. Byun, Ryangbo (Yangbo) (邊(邉)良輔) is the father of the Duke Cheomji faction (僉知公派). His official position was Cheomjungchu (僉中樞 currently a major general in the military rank) during the Joseon Dynasty. In 2023, the descendants of the Duke Jeonseo faction continue through the 23rd generation, and the descendants of the Duke Cheomji faction are ongoing through the 18th generation.

Sook (肅), Duke Jeonseo faction of the Wonju Byun, and Anseo (安緖), Duke Saryung faction of the Wonju Byun, became Wonju Byun clan by order of Anyeol, the founder of Wonju Byun clan, but since they are not direct descendants of Anyeol but rather his nephew and younger brother, it is possible to think of them as part of the Hwangju Byun clan generation.

Duke Jeonseo faction (典書公派): Sook (肅)'s descendants lived in Yonbaek-gun or Kaepung-gun or Kaesong, Hwanghae Province for nearly 600 years until the Korean War in 1950. The Clan Villages are Mogye-ri, Onjeong-myeon, Yonbaek-gun, Hwanghae Province, and Jungryeon-ri, Gwangdeok-myeon, Kaepung-gun, Hwanghae Province.

The hometown of the right-hand photo, Heepung Byun (邊(邉)熙豊, 20th generation of Duke Jeonseo faction), is Kaepung or Kaesong. Kaepung or Kaesong was South Korean territory when the 38th parallel was the border between North and South Korea, but after the Korean War, when the armistice line divided South and North Korea, it became North Korean territory. He moved from Kaesong to Seoul with his brothers during the Korean War and became a descendant of the Duke Cheomji and Jesonseo faction of the Wonju Byun clan, who could continue the generation in South Korea.

Sook Byun's tomb is located in Dong-myeon, Yonan-gun. Yijin Byun's tomb is in Yucheon-myeon, Paechon-gun, Hwanghae province. From Hwan Byun to Moon Byun, tombs are located in Jungryeon-ri, Seo-myeon, Pungdeok-gun. From Hankook Byun to Jihyun Byun, the tombs are in Banghwagyo, Haengsu-dong, Jungryeon-ri, Pungdeok-gun. Seokyeon Byun's tomb is in Banghwagyo, Yongmi-dong, Jungryeon-ri, Pungdeok-gun. Seungphil Byun and Hyungsik Byun are buried in Jacheok-dong, Jungryeon-ri, Pungdeok-gun. Heepung Byun] is buried at Daeji Park (Saenggeuk-myeon, Eumseong-gun, North Chungcheong province), and Eungzou Byun is at the National Icheon Patriots' Cemetery in Icheon city, Gyeonggi province.

Duke Byuljwa faction (別坐公派): The eldest son of Hyun (顯), Kukchung (克忠, 1434- ?) lived in Yangju, Gyeonggi Province since Anyeol, the founder of the Wonju Byun clan. He lived in Incheon (仁川) since Cheoryeong (處寧), the 4th generation of the Wonju Byun clan. Duke Chamui faction (參議公派): Hyun (顯)’s second son, Kukmin (克愍) lived in Taecheon, Pyeongan Province. He lived in Taein (泰仁), North Pyongan Province, starting from Jaejung (載重) of the 4th generation of the Wonju Byun clan.

Duke Cheomchu faction (僉樞公派): Yi' (㶊)s eldest son, Chahee (次憙, 1392-1462) lived in Geumgye, Yecheon, Yongmun, and Bonghwageochon in Andong, North Gyeongsang Province. Heeri (希李, 1435-1506), the 5th generation of the Wonju Byun clan, moved to Yecheon, North Gyeongsang Province during the reign of Muosahwa of Yeonsangun (1498). Heeri's successor, Yeongsun (永淳), the 7th generation of the Wonju Byun clan, lived in Geumgye, Bonghwa, and Gunwi in Andong. The 6th generation of the Wonju Byun clan has lived in Wonju, Gangwon Province since Jeom(店).

The Jeonju Byun clan is the Duke Hogeun faction, a descendant of Yi (㶊)’s 3rd son, Sanggeun. The Jeonju Byun clan on Wikipedia is incorrect.

Duke Hunryun faction (訓鍊公派): The Wonju Byun clan living on Jeju Island is the descendant of Ye (預). Duke Jungrangjang fraction (中郞將公派): The descendants of Secheong (世淸), the youngest grandson of Ye(預). Secheong (世淸) and his descendants are the Duke Jungrangjang faction. In 1405 (5th year of King Taejong's reign), when the political situation was chaotic, Secheong (世淸) felt his life was in danger and fled to Jeju Island.

In the figure on the right, Anyeol Byun's descendants are marked as H7-2, Anseo Byun's descendants are marked as H7-3, and Sook Byun's descendants are marked as H7-1-2. H7-2 refers to the second son of Ryang Byun, the 7th generation of the Hwangju Byun clan.

- Descendants of Sook Byun, Nephew of Anyeol or the son of the elder brother of Anyeol -

The Lineage of the Duke Jeonseo Faction.

Modern Korean Edition: Weaving the Past into the Future: Inscription of the Duke Jeonseo Fraction of the Wonju Byun Clan

5th generation descendants of Sook

Byun, Ryangbo] (Yangbo) (邊(邉)良輔): Duke Cheomji Faction(僉知公派). Find Your Ancestors in Duke Cheomji Fraction

Byun, Ryangjwa (Yangjwa) (邊(邉)良佐): Duke Gapsan Faction(甲山公派)

Byun, Ryangwu (Yangwu) (邊(邉)良佑): Duke Moksa Faction(牧使公派)

Byun, Ryangun (Yangun) (邊(邉)良彦): Duke Jangsarang Faction(將仕郞公派)

Byun, Ryanggirl (Yanggeol) (邊(邉)良傑): Duke Jeongui Faction(貞毅公派)

- Descendants of Anseo Byun, Anyeol's younger brother -

Byun, Anseo (邊(邉)安緖): Duke Saryung Faction(寺令公派)

- Descendants of Anyeol Byun -

1. Anyeol's first son, Hyun's son

Byun, Geukchung (邊(邉)克忠): Duke Byuljwa Faction (別坐公派)

Byun, Geukmin (邊(邉)克愍): Duke Chamui Faction (參議公派)

2. Anyeol's second son, Yi's son

Byun, Chahee (邊(邉)次熹): Duke Cheomchu Faction (僉樞公派)

Byun, Sangjo (邊(邉)尙朝): Duke Namburyung Faction (南部令公派)

Byun, Sanggeun (邊(邉)尙覲): Duke Hokeun Faction (護廍公派)

Byun, Sanghoi (邊(邉)尙會): Duke Champan Faction (參判公派)

Byun, Sangdong (邊(邉)尙同): Duke Gamchal Faction (監察公派)

Byun, Sangbing (邊(邉)尙聘): Duke Gunsu Faction (郡守公派)

Byun, Sangbok (邊(邉)尙服): Duke Buma Faction (駙馬公派)

3. Anyeol's third son, Ye

Byun, Ye(邊(邉)預): Duke Hunryun Faction (訓鍊公派) Anyeol's 3rd son

Anyeol's third son, Ye's son

Byun, Yeongcheong (邊(邉)永淸): Duke Sayong Faction (司勇公派)

Byun, Secheong (邊(邉)世淸): Duke Jungrangjang Faction (中郞將公派)

== Generation Characters ==
Generation Characters were used starting from the 5th generation and were not used for the 6th, 8th, 10th, and 12th generations because their names were one letter (a single character). Starting from the 16th generation, Generation Characters were created using 'Five Elements'. 'Five Elements' consist of Wood, Fire, Soil, Metal, and Water. Generation Characters' radicals (index components) are 'Five Elements'. 'Generation Characters' were written as the first and second letters alternately for each generation. The reason for using Generation Characters is as a way to identify which generation is within the same clan.

16th	17th	18th	19th	20th	21st	22nd	23rd	24th	25th
Fire(火)	Soil(土)	Mtal(金)	Water(水)	Wood(木)	Fire(火)	Soil(土)	Mtal(金)	Water(水)	Wood(木)

26th	27th	28th	29th	30th	31st	32nd
Fire(火)	Soil(土)	Mtal(金)	Water(水)	Wood(木)	Fire(火)	Soil(土)

5th	7th	9th	11th	13th	14th	15th
○Hwa(和)	○Jeong(靖); Sun(純)○	Ryang(良)○ Eung(應)○ ○Yong(龍) ○Su(秀) ○Jong(宗)	Yi(以)○	Sang(尙)○	○Kuk(國)	Kyung(慶)○

16th	17th	18th	19th	20th	21st	22nd	23rd
○Hwan(煥)	Kyu(圭)○	Seok(錫)○	Young(永)○ Seung(承)○	○Sik(植) ○Keun(根) ○Sang(相)	Hee(熙)○ Young(煐)○ Byung(炳)○	○Joo(周) ○Kyun(均)	Heum(欽)○ Yong(鎔)○ Jong(鍾)○

24th	25th	26th	27th	28th	29th	30th	31st	32nd
○Je(濟) ○Su(洙) ○Ho(浩)	(秀)○ Dong(東)○ Keun(根)○	○Hwan(煥) ○Don(燉) ○Chan(燦)	Kyu(圭)○ Jae(在)○ Bae(培)○	○Hyun(鉉) ○Jin(鎭) ○Yong(鏞)	Tae(泰)○ Ku(求)○	○Ju(柱) ○Jae(栽) ○Baek(栢)	Kyung(炅)	○Jae(在)

== Other prominent members ==
Prominent clan members include:

Pyon Su (변수, 邊(邉)燧, also known as Penn Su, 1861-1891), a Korean diplomat that in 1891 became the first Korean student ever to receive a degree from an American institution. Pyon received a degree from the Maryland Agricultural College (MAC), now known as the University of Maryland. Pyon was part of the 1883 Korean special mission to the United States, which was dispatched by Joseon King Gojong in July 1883 to study the West's industrialization and modernization processes. The delegation met with then U.S. President Chester A. Arthur. Pyon eventually became involved in the radical reformist political movements of late-19th-century Korea and played a role in fomenting the failed Gapsin Coup of 1884. Pyon fled Korea and ultimately migrated to Japan and the U.S., where he obtained his degree and briefly worked for the U.S. Department of Agriculture. He possessed Chinese, Japanese, and English language capabilities. Pyon died in 1891 after he was struck by a train. He is buried in Beltsville, Maryland. On December 21, 2020, the University of Maryland announced that it would name a new residence hall the “Pyon-Chen Hall” in honor of Pyon and Chunjen Constant Chen, who in 1915 became the first Chinese student to enroll at MAC.

Byun, Sook (변숙, 邊(邉)肅, ?-1399). Sook Byun is the second generation of the Wonju Byun clan and the founder of the duke Jeonseo fraction. Sook, along with Chŏng Mong-ju, was a loyal subject of the late Goryeo Dynasty and a person who maintained the political integrity of Goryeo. Chŏng Mong-ju's pen name was P'oŭn. King Taejo of Joseon (Lee Seong-gye King Taejo) imprisoned Sook's wife and children, and Sook crossed over to Byeokranjin to the west with her son, Eulchung Byun. When Goryeo fell, Sook kept his loyalty that he could not serve two kings, so he moved his residence to Paechon county and called the people who lived there Moryejeolsa (慕麗節士). He is one of the 72 counties of Dumundong 두문동 (杜門洞). Moryejeolsa (慕麗節士) means admiring Goryeo and maintaining fidelity. Dumun-dong is the old name of the western foot of Gwangdeok Mountain in Gwangdeok-myeon, Kaepung county. Dumundong Seventy-Two People (杜門洞七十二人) or Dumundong Seventy-Two Hyeon (杜門洞七十二賢) refer to the 72 Yusin (遺臣) who are said to have been loyal to Goryeo and maintained fidelity immediately after the fall of Goryeo. Dumundong Seventy-Two Hyeon was a representative symbol of fidelity and loyalty in Korea before modernization. The tomb is located in Jaegyeong-dong (near Kaesong), at the eastern foot of Yongsu Mountain, Dong-myeon, Yonan-gun. The descendants of Sook (肅), a member of the Duke Jeonseo fraction, continued as Eulchung (乙忠), Hwak (確, Hojochamui), Jajung (自靖, Hojochamui), We (偉, Jwachanseong), Ryangbo (良輔, Cheomjungchu), Soo(洙, Hojochampan), Yijin (以震, Byeongjochamui), Hwan (寏, Tongdeokrang), Sangdam (尙聃, Cheomjungchu), Moon (璊), Hankook (翰國), Kyungin (慶仁, Tongdeokrang), Taehwa (泰和), Dongwoo (東羽), Jihyun (志賢), Seokyeon (錫淵), Seungphil (承弼), Hyungsik (馨植), Heepung (熙豊), Eungzou (應周), Jongho (鍾昊), Keunho (根浩 Daniel), and Minho (珉浩 Joe). The descendants of the Duke Jeonseo fraction of the Wonju Byun lived in Kaesong from the first generation to the 20th generation, Heepung Byun (변희풍邊(邉)熙豊). However, due to the Korean War, Heepung(熙豊) moved from Kaesong to Seoul. He left the following the Family Code of Honor of the Duke Jeonseo fraction to his descendants: “I hope only good things will happen to the Byun family. Act in harmony with the will of the world and the hearts of people, observe everything around you, and do your best to achieve your heart's desires, and the Byun family will be honored (邊門堂中慶雲起. 應天順人智盧新. 周到凡事心氣活. 一展大志聲四隣).”

Byun, Ryangbo] (Yangbo) (변량보(양보), 邊(邉)良輔, ?-?). Ryangbo Byun is the father of the Duke Cheomji fraction of the Wonju Byun clan. He is the seventh generation of the Wonju Byun clan, the sixth generation of Jeonseo fraction of the Wonju Byun clan. Ryangbo Byun's Courtesy name was Kukno (國老, Treat him like a king). Ryangbo served as Cheomjungchu (僉中樞 currently, administrator or military rank Major General). He had four sons, Soo (洙), Sok (涑), Ki (沂), and Rak (洛). He is the progenitor of the Cheomji faction. Cheomji was the official rank of Jeong 3 Pum military officer of the central government. Ryangbo's younger brothers used their official positions to each become new fractions of the Wonju Byun clan. Ryangbo's (良輔) younger brothers are Ryangjwa, Ryangwu, Ryangun, and Ryanggirl. Ryangjwa (良佐) is the duke Gapsan faction, Ryangwu (良佑) is the duke Moksa faction, Ryangun (良彦) is the duke Jangsarang faction, and Ryanggirl is the duke Jeongui faction. Ryanggirl (良傑) was a Chungcheong-do naval commander (currently a general) during the Japanese invasions of Joseon, commonly known as the Limjin War, and contributed to protecting Ganghwa Island.

Byun, Ryanggirl (Yanggeol) (변량걸(양걸), 邊(邉)良傑, 1546-1610). He is the father of the Duke Jeongeui faction of the Wonju Byun clan. He is the seventh generation of the Wonju Byun clan, the sixth generation of Jeonseo fraction of the Wonju Byun clan. Ryanggirl Byun's Courtesy name was Kukhwa (國華) and Posthumous name is Jeongui (貞毅). After passing the military service examination in 1572 (5th year of King Seonjo's reign), he served as Deputy Director of Yongyangwi, Governor of Byeokdong County, Jeolsa of Insanjincheom, and Busa of Ganggye. In 1583, when the Jurchen tribe crossed the Tumen River and invaded Gyeongwon Province, he went to work as a Moksa and Jobangjang of Gilju. When the Limjin War broke out in Joseon, he procured military supplies to the Hanjaeso by sea, while working with Changguisa Cheonil Kim (金千鎰) to defend Ganghwa Island and ensured that the government's orders were delivered to Chungcheong Province and Jeolla Province. He also served as a military commander in Chungcheong Province and a military commander in South Hamgyong Province and contributed to protecting Ganghwa Island as a military commander in Chungcheong Province.

Byun, Yijin (변이진, 邊(邉)以震, 1596-1640). Yijin Byun is the ninth generation of the Wonju Byun clan, the eighth generation of Jeonseo fraction of the Wonju Byun clan, and the third generation of Cheomji fraction of the Wonju Byun clan. Yijin Byun’s Courtesy name was Hyungbo (亨甫). Yijin was born on February 2, 1596 (February 29, 1596. King Seonjo of Joseon dynasty). Yijin passed a mugwa (a military service exam) in 1620 (King Gwanghaegun of Joseon dynasty). Yijin served King Injo (1623-1649) as a Seonjeongwan (Major General) and was invested with the title of a Dosa (Jong 5 Pum, Vice-Governor) and Gyeongnyeok (Jong 5 Pum, Lieutenant Colonel) of a Dochongbu (Highest military authority). In 1624 (King Injo of Joseon dynasty), Yi Gwal's Rebellion had broken out, and Yijin defeated Yi Gwal's army at Capital and Ansan. In 1638, Yijin was invested with the title of Jeolla Jwasuwuhu (Jong 3 Pum, military service position Colonel). On January 25, 1640 (February 16, 1640. King Injo of Joseon dynasty), Yijin faced enemies (Japanese) at the sea in front of Chilsan, Yeongam County (Songseok-ri, Haeje-myeon, Muan County, South Jeolla Province), and died in the line of duty. After Yijin's death, the Joseon royal court invested him with the title of a Byungjochamui (Jeong 2 Pum, Minister). The tomb is located in a resting place in the Hodu mountain in Yucheonmyeon, Paechon County.

Byun, Eungzou (변응주, 邊(邉)應周, 1929-2016). Eungzou Byun is the 22nd generation of the Wonju Byun clan, the 21st generation of Jeonseo fraction of the Wonju Byun clan, and the sixteenth generation of Cheomji fraction of the Wonju Byun clan. Eungzou Byun was a South Korean soldier during the Korean War. During the Korean War from 1951 to 1954, he served as a soldier in the Korea Liaison Office or 8240th Army Unit and worked as a math teacher at Ganghwa Middle School (currently Ganghwa Girls' Middle School, 11 Gapryong-gil, Ganghwa-eup, Ganghwa-gun, Ganghwa County, Incheon) to collect information about North Korea in the area near the armistice line. He disguised himself as a school teacher and was tasked with conveying North Korean military secrets to the South Korean military. He worked at Amorepacific Corporation from 1955 to 1969. From 1969 to 2016, he served as a senior advisor and senior advisor to Amorepacific Corporation. He created the foundation of the company with Seong-Hwan Suh (Suh Kyung-bae's father), President of Amorepacific Corporation. The following article was written in 1963 by Eungzou Byun while serving as Executive Director at Taepyeongyang Chemical (now Amorepacific), titled “Is Mass Selling Possible? Focusing on Supermarkets” (published in Management of Enterprises, No. 59, pp. 31–32). The original can be accessed at the National Assembly Library. The following is a summary of its key points. Improving Distribution through Small Supermarkets: 1. Domestic distribution is weaker than Japan’s and relies heavily on counterfeit goods and scattered retail stores. To address this, small, cosmetics-focused supermarkets are proposed in general markets, with experience zones to enhance consumer trust. 2. The operational strategy targets female consumers and market visitors, emphasizing regional product selection, high-quality affordable items, price stability, and strict elimination of counterfeits. Beauty and cooking experience zones further enhance engagement, while core products remain cosmetics and supplementary items are offered at reasonable prices. 3. In conclusion, the small supermarket strategy serves as a pilot initiative to improve distribution and revitalize the authentic product market, contributing to consumer trust and laying the foundation for mass sales in the cosmetics industry. From October 1, 1971 to December 31, 1993, OB Food Industry Co., Ltd. (Business Registration Number 130–81–00708, Corporation Registration Number 124311-0000234) was established and operated. OB Food Industry Co., Ltd. was located in Cheoin-gu, Yongin-si, Gyeonggi-do, and grew into a company that produced biscuits, expanded sales nationwide, and implemented quality control based on a food safety management system. OB Food Inc.'s main products include OB Sand, Cocoa Flavored Sand, New Sand, Hibizo, El Dorado Saeroba, Kkokko, Cocoa Flavored Cookie, Sesame Dori, Butter Coconut Binggrae, Flower Village, New town, and Collected Candy. And they also provided biscuits to the military. OB Food Industry Co., Ltd. is a separate company from Doosan Group OB Beer Co., Ltd. The tomb is located in Icheon National Cemetery and the address is 1085 Daejuk-ri, 260 Noseong-ro, Seolseong-myeon, Icheon City, Gyeonggi Province, South Korea.

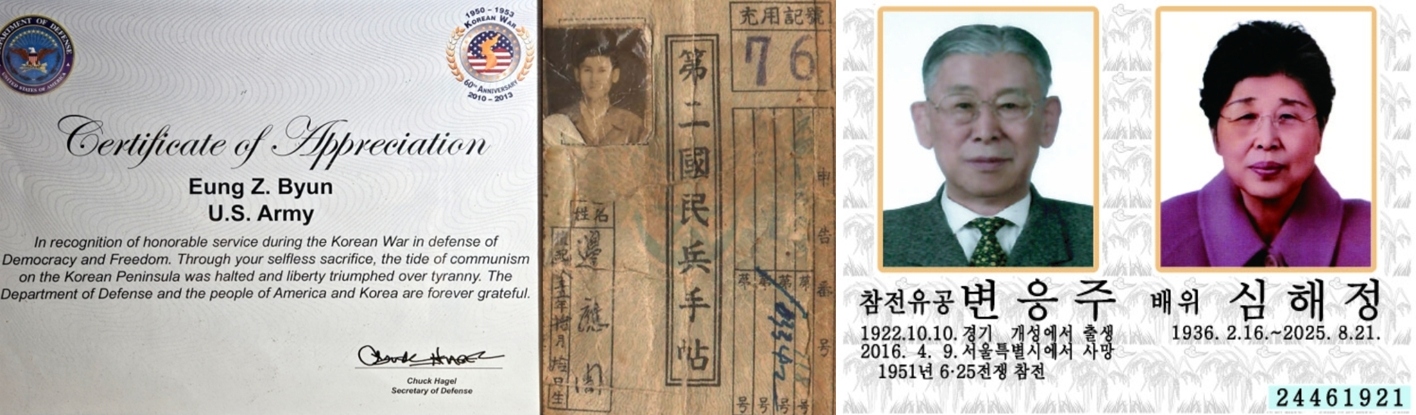

== See also ==
- Korean clan names of foreign origin

== Wonju Byun clan genealogy ==
- Heepung Byun (변희풍邊(邉)熙豊). ‘Genealogy Book of Duke Jeonseo fraction of the Wonju Byun Clan (원주변씨세보原州邊(邉)氏世譜): Gaseung (가승家乘).’ 21st generation of Wonju Byun Clan or 20th generation of Duke Jeonseo fraction of the Wonju Byun Clan or 15th generation of Duke Cheomji fraction of the Wonju Byun Clan. 1996.
- Weaving the Past into the Future: Inscription of the Duke Jeonseo Fraction of the Wonju Byun Clan 1352-1830. 2025. Eungzou Byun (변응주邊(邉)應周) ISBN 979-11-419-6668-3
- 8240th Army Unit. WP-1 (Former ROK Army 1st Division 5816th Unit) or United Nations Partisan Infantry Korea.
- 'The Story of the Ancestors recorded in the Inscription on a Tombstone of Duke Jeonseo fraction of the Wonju Byun Clan (원주변씨原州邊(邉)氏비상단碑狀單)'. Duke Jeonseo fraction of Wonju Byun Clan Association, 1986
- ‘Duke Jeonseo fraction Genealogy Book of the Wonju Byun Clan (원주변씨原州邊(邉)氏전서공파세보典書公派世譜)’. Duke Jeonseo fraction of Wonju Byun Clan Association, 2006.
- The Direct Lineage Story of Duke Jeonseo and Cheomji Fraction of Wonju Byun Clan in Korea원주변씨原州邊(邉)氏전서/첨지공파典書/僉知公派 직계이야기 :1138~2016, Bookk. 2024. ISBN 979-11-410-8944-3 . Google Books
- Chŏnsŏ mit Ch'ŏmji Kongp'a Han'guk Wŏnju Pyŏn Ssi chikkye iyagi (The Direct Lineage Story of Duke Jeonseo and Cheomji Fraction of Wonju Byun Clan in Korea). LIBRARY OF CONGRESS 미국의회도서관. 101 Independence Ave SE, Washington, DC 20540 USA. Available at Princeton University Library 프린스턴대학도서관. Available at Harvard University Library 하버드대학도서관. Available at National Library of Korea 국립중앙도서관 999.82-24-29
- Kwagŏ ro mirae rŭl yŏkta : Wŏnju Pyŏn Ssi Chŏnsŏgongp'a pimun / Pyŏng Ŭng-ju chiŭm (Weaving the past into the future : inscription of the Duke Jeonseo Fraction of the Wonju Byun Clan / Eungzou Byun). 과거로 미래를 엮다 : 원주 변씨 전서공파 비문 / 변응주 지음. LIBRARY OF CONGRESS 미국 의회도서관. Available at Princeton University Library 프린스턴대학 도서관 소장. Available at Harvard University Library 하버드대학 도서관 소장. Available at National Library of Korea 국립중앙도서관 999.82-25-1
- ‘Wonju Byun Clan Cheomchugongpa (원주변씨原州邊(邉)氏첨추공파僉樞公派 duke Cheomchu faction) Geochonmunjungbo (거촌문중보巨村門中譜 genealogy of Geochonmu faction) Literature Collection’. Yeolhwadang, 2020. ISBN 978-89-301-0681-8
- ‘Kwangdeok-myeon Historical Record (光德面誌, Kwangdeok-myeon, Kaepung-gun)’. Wooins, May 26, 2006.
- 72 prefectures of Dumundong (변숙邊(邉)肅, 두문동杜門洞)
- Encyclopedia of Korean Folk Culture (한국민속문화대백과사전). Byun, Ryanggirl(Yanggeol) (변량걸邊(邉)良傑)
- THE STORY OF…. Your Great-Grandfathers: Duke Jeonseo and Cheomji Fraction of Wonju Byun Clan 1138~1945 ISBN 979-11-93655-81-8
- Byun, Eungzou, Executive Director, Taepyungyang Chemical. “Is Mass Marketing Possible? Focusing on Supermarkets.” Korea Productivity Center Business Management, no. 59, 1963, pp. 31–32. MAIN CONTENT. Original document.
- Even if I am reborn, I will run a Cosmetics Business ISBN 978-89-255-5717-5
- Duke Jeonseo and Cheomji Fraction of Wonju Byun Clan
- Icheon National Cemetery, Operational Areas of the 5816 Guerrilla Unit (Korea Liaison Office) in the Korean War, in which Eungzou Byun Served
- Beneath the Northern Sky: Village Story from North Korea - The Food and People Await. ISBN 979-11-419-4412-4. Available at Harvard University Library하버드대학도서관. Available at National Library of Korea국립중앙도서관. Available at the Library of Congress의회도서관. National Assembly Library of South Korea국회도서관.
- A 1976 K-FOOD COOKBOOK Gifted to Daughter-in-Law by Mother in English and Korean by Haejung Shim, ISBN 9791172777067. Available at National Library of Korea국립중앙도서관. Available at the National Assembly Library of South Korea국회도서관.
- Eungzou Byun. 1950 Through My Eyes: The Korean War and Amorepacific Corp. Available at Harvard University Library하버드대학도서관. Available at UCLA Library UCLA 도서관. Available at National Library of Korea국립중앙도서관. Available at the Library of Congress의회도서관. National Assembly Library of South Korea국회도서관.
- Kwangdeok-myeon, Kaepung-gun, Not-To-Be-Missed Places
- Grandma and Grandpa Resemble Me: The 3rd story of…Your Great-grandfathers. ISBN 979-11-12-11394-8. Genealogy & Personal Record Entry Form
- Historical Archive – Duke Jeonseo Branch, Wonju Byun Clan. Over 600 Years of Heritage in Kwangdeok-myeon, Kaepung, and 19 Fierce Battles of the Korean War

== Biographic material ==
- Goryeosa (고려사, 高麗史), Volume 126 (contains a biography of Byeon An-ryeol (Anyeol))
