= Donkey Squads (Korean War) =

Partisan force during the Korean War

The Donkeys were a partisan force during the Korean War that consisted of anti-communist North Korean defectors who engaged in guerrilla warfare, long-range penetration, and search and rescue POWs. The fighters were formed under the United Nations Partisan Infantry Forces. Guerrillas had a huge impact on the United States effort in North Korea. In the end, these partisan forces conducted 4,445 actions in North Korea that led to the capture of 950 prisoners, 5,000 weapons, 2,700 destroyed vehicles, 80 bridges demolished, 69,000 casualties (dead and wounded), 3,189 guerrilla deaths, and only four American advisers were KIA. Furthermore, according to the 5th Air Force, of the 93 pilots who had been shot down and evaded capture between July 1950 and January 1952, guerrilla fighters rescued 29.

== Origins ==
During the Korean War, The Chief of Intelligence of the United States Far East Command (FECOM), Major General Charles A. Willoughby had been receiving unconfirmed reports of a guerrilla resistance. It was not until Jan. 8, 1951, when the U.S. Eighth Army found roughly 10,000 partisans in the Hwanghae Province. These fighters had withdrawn to the Hwange Province after China entered the war and the forces of the United Nations had withdrawn.

Once this intelligence had been confirmed, Colonel John McGee was sent to manage a partisan operation. After receiving a report from Major William Burke that partisan groups occupied five islands, Colonel McGee made a plan that these partisan groups would be trained and equipped by Americans. These partisan groups, as described by Colonel McGee, "were a colorful group of fighters ranging in age from youths to elderly men."

Once these groups became organized in the 8240th Army Unit, they called themselves "donkeys." There are three ideas as to the origin of the name. One theory is that a donkey symbolizes traits of their force like sturdy, patient and mean. Another idea is that they supposedly looked like they were riding donkeys when they operated a crank-driven generator.

== Examples of "Donkey" Squads ==
Donkey-1: First "Donkey" squad to return to mainland North Korea. On March 3, 1951, under the leadership of Chang Jae Hwa - a former merchant - 37 partisans moved to Hwang-ju and Sari-won in order to receive information on enemy movements. The results of this mission were 280 enemies killed and telephone wires and railroad links cut.

Donkey-4 (White Tigers): Donkey-4 was a band of 4,000 guerrilla units under the leadership of, in 1952 lieutenant, Colonel Ben S. Malcom. On July 13, 1952, Pak Chol asked 1st Lieutenant Malcom that they needed to take out a 76 mm gun the North Koreans were using to harass the partisan base located at Wollae-do. This mission was a success, for they destroyed the gun and only lost six partisans and had seven others wounded.

== See also ==
- Korea Liaison Office
- 8240th Army Unit
- Joint Advisory Commission, Korea
- United Nations Partisan Infantry Korea
- Guerrilla Warfare

== Books ==
- "White Tigers: My Secret War in North Korea" by Ben S. Malcom
- "Darkmoon: Eighth Army Special Operations in the Korean War" by Ed Evanhoe
- "Shadow Warriors: The Covert War in Korea" by William B. Breuer
