= Klo =

Klo or KLO may refer to:

- Kalibo International Airport (IATA: KLO), Philippines
- Kamtapur Liberation Organisation, India
- Karabakh Liberation Organization (Qarabağ Azadlıq Təşkilatı), Azerbaijan
- Korea Liaison Office, an American intelligence unit in the Korean War
- KLO-FM, a radio station serving Coalville, Utah, US
- KMES, a radio station (1430 AM) licensed to serve Ogden, Utah, United States, which held the call sign KLO from 1929 to 2020
- Lhoba people of Southeastern Tibet, also known as "Klo"
- A neighbourhood of Kelowna, British Columbia, Canada
