= List of people of the Three Kingdoms (B) =

The following is a partial list of people significant to the Three Kingdoms period (220–280) of Chinese history. Their romanised names start with the letter B.

== B ==
Name	Courtesy name	Birth year	Death year	Ancestral home (present-day location)	Role	Allegiance	Previous allegiance(s)	Notes
Ba Zhi 巴祗	Jingzu 敬祖				Politician	Han dynasty		Xie Cheng's Houhanshu annotation in Sanguozhi vol. 8.
Lady Bai 柏夫人					Sima Lun's mother	Cao Wei		Jinshu vol. 38.
Baihuwen 白虎文				Liangzhou (Zhangjiachuan, Gansu)	Tribal leader	Tufa Shujineng	Cao Wei, Shu Han	Sanguozhi vol. 33; Songshu vol. 33.
Bai Jue 白爵					Rebel leader	Yellow Turban rebels		Jiuzhou Chunqiu annotation in Sanguozhi vol. 8.
Bai Rao 白繞					Rebel leader	Zhang Yan		Sanguozhi vol. 1.
Bai Shou 白壽					General	Shu Han		Hanjin Chunqiu annotation in Sanguozhi vol. 35.
Bai Xiaochang 柏孝長				Nanyang (Nanyang, Henan)	General	Han dynasty		Jiuzhou Chunqiu annotation in Sanguozhi vol. 23.
Banxia 頒下					Tribal leader	Wuhuan		Yingxiongji annotation in Sanguozhi vol. 30.
Bao Cheng 鮑成				Xinfeng, Jingzhaoyin (Xi'an, Shaanxi)				Weilue annotation in Sanguozhi vol. 18.
Bao Chu 鮑初				Xinfeng, Jingzhaoyin (Xi'an, Shaanxi)				Weilue annotation in Sanguozhi vol. 18.
Bao Chu 鮑出	Wencai 文才			Xinfeng, Jingzhaoyin (Xi'an, Shaanxi)				Weilue annotation in Sanguozhi vol. 18.
Bao Hong 鮑鴻			189	Youfufeng (Xi'an, Shaanxi)	General	Han dynasty		
Bao Rong 鮑融				Pingyang County, Taishan (Xintai, Shandong)	Politician	Cao Wei		Weishu annotation in Sanguozhi vol. 12.
Bao Shao 鮑邵				Pingyang County, Taishan (Xintai, Shandong)	General	Cao Wei		Sanguozhi vol. 12.
Bao Tao 鮑韜			190	Pingyang County, Taishan (Xintai, Shandong)	General	Han dynasty		Bao Zhong in novel.
Bao Xin 鲍信		152	192	Pingyang County, Taishan (Xintai, Shandong)	General, politician	Han dynasty		Weishu annotation in Sanguozhi vol. 12.
Bao Xun 鮑勛	Shuye 叔業		226	Pingyang County, Taishan (Xintai, Shandong)	General, politician	Cao Wei		Sanguozhi vol. 12.
Bao Ya 鮑雅				Xinfeng, Jingzhaoyin (Xi'an, Shaanxi)				Weilue annotation in Sanguozhi vol. 18.
Bao Zichun 鮑子春					Politician, diviner	Cao Wei		Lu Biezhuan annotation in Sanguozhi vol. 29.
Bei Yan 卑衍					General	Gongsun Yuan		
Bei Yu 貝羽					General	Han dynasty		Zhanlue annotation in Sanguozhi vol. 29.
Bei Zhan 卑湛				Mo County, Hejian (North of Renqiu, Hebei)		Cao Wei		Sanguozhi vol. 17.
Beigong Boyu 北宮伯玉			186	Huangzhong (Huangshui River, Qinghai)	Rebel leader	Qiang	Han dynasty	Beigong Yu in RTK 7
Bi Chen 畢諶				Dongping (Dongping County, Shandong)	Politician	Cao Cao		Sanguozhi vol. 1.
Bi Gui 畢軌	Zhaoxian 昭先		249	Dongping (Dongping County, Shandong)	Advisor	Cao Wei		Weilue annotation in Sanguozhi vol. 9.
Bi Lan 畢嵐			189		Eunuch	Han dynasty		
Bi Yu 畢瑜					Politician	Han dynasty		Xiandi Qiju Zhu annotation in Sanguozhi vol. 1.
Bi Zili 畢子禮				Dongping (Dongping County, Shandong)	General	Han dynasty		Weilue annotation in Sanguozhi vol. 9.
Empress Bian 卞皇后				Kaiyang, Langya (Lanshan District, Linyi, Shandong)	Empress	Cao Wei		Sanguozhi vol. 5.
Empress Bian 卞皇后				Kaiyang, Langya (Lanshan District, Linyi, Shandong)	Empress (Cao Mao)	Cao Wei		Sanguozhi vol. 4, 5.
Lady Bian 卞氏		159	230	Kaiyang, Langya (Lanshan District, Linyi, Shandong)	Empress dowager	Cao Wei		Sanguozhi vol. 5. See also Cao Wei family trees.
Bian Bing 卞秉				Kaiyang, Langya (Lanshan District, Linyi, Shandong)	General	Cao Wei		Sanguozhi vol. 5.
Bian Hong 邊鴻					General	Han dynasty		Sanguozhi vols. 51, 63; Jiankang Shilu vols. 2, 3.
Bian Hui 卞暉				Kaiyang, Langya (Lanshan District, Linyi, Shandong)		Cao Wei		Sanguozhi vol. 5.
Bian Lan 卞蘭				Kaiyang, Langya (Lanshan District, Linyi, Shandong)	General	Cao Wei		Sanguozhi vol. 5.
Bian Lin 卞琳				Kaiyang, Langya (Lanshan District, Linyi, Shandong)	General	Cao Wei		Sanguozhi vol. 5.
Bian Long 卞隆				Kaiyang, Langya (Lanshan District, Linyi, Shandong)	Politician	Cao Wei		Sanguozhi vol. 5.
Bian Rang 邊讓	Wenli 文禮		194	Junyi, Chenliu, Yanzhou (Kaifeng, Henan)	General, writer	Han dynasty		
Bian Shao 邊韶	Xiaoxian 孝先			Junyi, Chenliu (Kaifeng, Henan)	Scholar, politician	Han dynasty		
Bian Yuan 卞遠				Kaiyang, Langya (Lanshan District, Linyi, Shandong)		Cao Cao		Sanguozhi vol. 5.
Bian Zhang 邊章				Jincheng (Lanzhou, Gansu)	General	Han dynasty		
Bing Yuan 邴原	Genju 根矩			Zhuxu, Beihai (West of Changle County, Shandong)	Politician, scholar	Han dynasty		Sanguozhi vol. 11.
Bing Chun 邴春				Zhuxu, Beihai (West of Changle County, Shandong)		Jin dynasty		Wang Yin's Jinshu annotation in Sanguozhi vol. 11.
Bo Cai 波才			184		General	Yellow Turban rebels		Houhanshu vol. 71.
Bogu 伯固				Xuantu County (Tonghua, Jilin)	Tribal leader	Goguryeo		
Bu Chan 步闡	Zhongsi 仲思		272	Huaiyin, Linhuai (Huai'an, Jiangsu)	General	Jin dynasty	Eastern Wu	
Bu Ji / Bu Si 卜己 / 卜巳					Rebel leader	Yellow Turban rebels		Houhanshu vol. 71; Xuhanshu annotation in Houhanshu vol. 58
Bu Ji 步璣			272	Huaiyin, Linhuai (Huai'an, Jiangsu)	Politician, general	Jin dynasty	Eastern Wu	
Bu Jing 卜靜	Xuanfeng 玄風			Wu County (Suzhou, Jiangsu)	Politician	Eastern Wu		
Bu Lianshi 步練師			238	Huaiyin, Linhuai (Huai'an, Jiangsu)	Noble lady	Eastern Wu		Sanguozhi vol. 50.
Bu Qing 卜清								Kuaiji Dianlu annotation in Sanguozhi vol. 57.
Bu Xie 步協				Huaiyin, Linhuai (Huai'an, Jiangsu)	General	Eastern Wu		
Bu Xuan 步璿				Huaiyin, Linhuai (Huai'an, Jiangsu)	Politician, general	Jin dynasty	Eastern Wu	
Bu Zhi 步騭	Zishan 子山		247	Huaiyin, Linhuai (Huai'an, Jiangsu)	Advisor, politician	Eastern Wu		Sanguozhi vol. 52.
Bubiyi 卜賁邑					Tribal leader	Xianbei		Weishu annotation in Sanguozhi vol. 30.
Budugen 步度根			233		Tribal leader	Xianbei		Sanguozhi vol. 30.
