= Joint Advisory Commission, Korea =

Korean War covert operations unit

The Joint Advisory Commission, Korea (JACK; Korean: 주한합동고문단) was a U.S. covert operations unit that participated in the Korean War.

Operating under the direction of the Central Intelligence Agency, JACK was responsible for inserting and extracting U.S.-trained Korean agents into North Korea, conducting covert maritime raids along the North Korean coast, and providing escape and evasion support for downed Air Force pilots.

Yong-do Group (영도유격대) based in Yeongdo District, Busan was the main guerrilla unit.

== See also ==
- Korea Liaison Office
- 8240th Army Unit
- United Nations Partisan Infantry Korea
- Former United States special operations units
- Special Activities Division
