= 8240th Army Unit =

1951–1952 Korean War guerrilla unit

- Active: July 1951–November 1952
- Allegiance: UN
- Type: Commando
- Role: Artillery observer Clandestine operation Close-quarters battle Direct action HUMINT; Irregular warfare Long-range penetration Parachuting; Raiding; Reconnaissance; Special operations Special reconnaissance Tracking
- Size: 100

Commanders
- Unit Commander: Captain Donald Seibert

The 8240th Army Unit (8240th AU) was an American guerrilla commando unit that operated during the Korean War that specialized in clandestine operation, commando style raids, gathering tactical field intelligence, irregular warfare, long-range penetration, and special operations behind enemy lines. It consisted of US Army advisors who mainly trained South Korean partisans for operations in North Korea.

== History ==
One of the 8240th Army Unit's predecessors was the Korea Liaison Office (KLO), which operated from 1949 to 1951. In July 1951, the KLO was incorporated into the 8240th Army Unit.

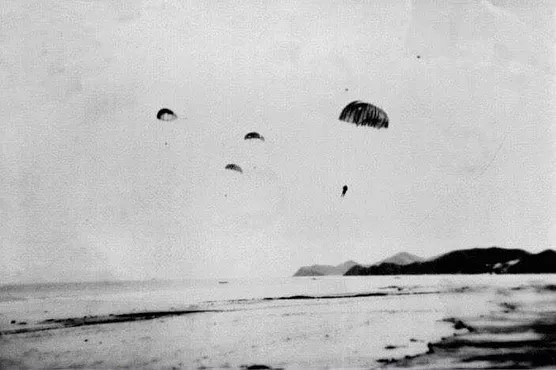
The 8240th AU during a Parachute exercise.

The 8240th AU, led by Captain Donald Seibert, focused on training South Korean troops and irregular warfare. Operations included dropping airborne guerilla commando forces far behind enemy lines, as well as training North Korean refugees to gather intelligence by posing as North Korean soldiers.

In November 1952, the unit, along with other guerrilla commando units, was redesignated as United Nations Partisan Forces Korea.

== Units ==
There were 22 Donkey Units (Donkey-4 also known as White Tigers) and 8 Wolfpack units.

== Guerrilla activities ==
The Eighth Army took the guerrilla fighters and organized them into the "Donkey" squads in early 1951. These squads were organized on islands that, luckily, was a strategic advantage. The islands were behind enemy lines but were protected by the UN naval blockade and ROK garrisons from any enemy attack. There were five main activities that happened on these islands:

- Leopard Base
- Wolfpack
- Kirkland
- Baker Section
- Tactical Liaison Office

=== Leopard Base ===
Operating as far north as the Yalu River and as south of the Ongin Peninsula, Leopard Base (originally part of "Task Force William Able") was the headquarters for 11 guerrilla units. This area along the west coast of North Korea had around 400 islands and roughly 70% of these islands were under the control of the guerrilla forces. These were strategic for springboarding into the North.

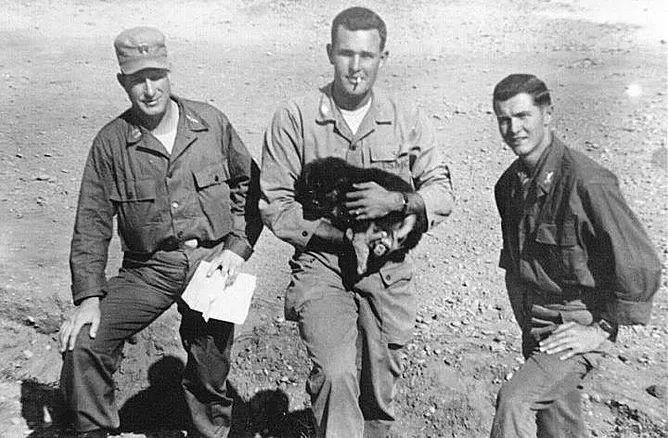
(Left to right) Captain Donald Seibert, Lt. Jim Mapp, and Lt. Ben Malcolm.

==== Notable Missions ====
- Donkey 1 on March 3, 1951
- Donkey 4 on July 13, 1952

=== Wolfpack ===
Wolfpack was the headquarters for 10,000 guerrillas which were operating south to Inchon. This was also originally part of "Task Force William Able" which was also on the west coast.

=== Kirkland ===
Organized in April 1951, Kirkland was composed of 300 guerrillas led by the CIA and Army on two islands east of the mainland. This partisan force operated in the area Wonsan south for missions led by the Army and in the north for missions by the CIA. These missions included collecting intelligence, identifying targets for Navy gunfire and air operations, and to conduct coastal raids. The base was not utilized very much during the war, for, at its peak, 4,844 partisans and 32 American advisers operated on the island.

=== Baker Section ===
Baker Section was known for training guerrillas to be paratrooper commandos so they could collect intelligence and conduct special operations behind enemy lines. These operations were intended to take out Chinese and North Korean resources as well as establish guerrilla bases. By the time the war ended, Baker Section had conducted 19 airborne operations that involved around 389 guerrilla partisans. The missions were mostly unsuccessful, and consider futile after the war.

==== Notable Missions ====
Operation Virginia: This mission was the first airborne operation conducted by the Baker Section. Beginning on the night of March 15, 1951, four Americans and 20 Koreans were dropped 30 miles inland from the Sea of Japan. The mission, which was to destroy railroad, was considered a complete failure for a plethora of reasons. A blizzard delayed the team's arrival, the team missed their drop zone, and when they called for an extraction one of the three helicopters were shot down.

=== Tactical Liaison Office ===
For every U.S. infantry division, roughly 25 guerrillas were trained by special forces. At any time, up to nine of these guerrilla commandos would go into North Korea wearing North Korean uniforms equipped with weapons and ID cards. Their objective was to gather intelligence while behind enemy lines. The Tactical Liaison Office was simply a cover name for the North Korean "line crossers." These operations were successful for they ran for two years without being compromised.

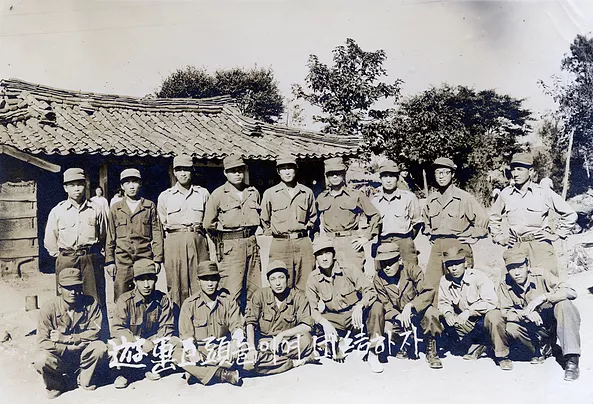
8240th AU Donkey leaders

== Legacy ==
A documentary about the unit has been produced by the History Channel as part of their Heroes Under Fire series.

The unit is widely seen as the second steppingstone towards a permanent special forces (SF) doctrine in the US Army.

== See also ==
- Korea Liaison Office
- Joint Advisory Commission, Korea
- United Nations Partisan Infantry Korea
- Merrill Newman
- 1st Special Forces Brigade
- Republic of Korea Army Special Warfare Command
