= Bi Chen =

Han dynasty official

- 畢諶

Chancellor of Lu (魯相)
- In office c. 195–?
- Monarch: Emperor Xian of Han

Personal details
- Born: Unknown
- Died: Unknown
- Occupation: Official

Bi Chen (fl. 191–195) was an official serving under the warlord Cao Cao in the late Eastern Han dynasty.

== Life ==
Bi Chen was from Dongping Commandery (東平郡; covering parts of present-day Shandong and Henan) in Yan Province. Around 191, when Cao Cao became the Governor of Yan Province, he recruited Bi Chen to serve as an Assistant Officer (別駕) under him. Later, in 194, when Cao Cao was away on a campaign against Tao Qian, the Governor of Xu Province, his subordinates Zhang Miao, Chen Gong and others rebelled against him in Yan Province and defected to another warlord Lü Bu. Bi Chen's family members were captured by the defectors. When Cao Cao returned to Yan Province to suppress the revolt and retake his territories, he told Bi Chen, "You're free to go to the rebels' side because your family members are being held hostage by them." Bi Chen kowtowed and reaffirmed his loyalty to Cao Cao. Cao Cao was so touched by Bi Chen's sincerity that he shed tears. However, Bi Chen broke his promise later when he joined Lü Bu. By late 195, Cao Cao had defeated Lü Bu and seized back all his territories in Yan Province. Bi Chen was captured alive by Cao Cao's forces. Many people feared for Bi Chen because they thought that Cao Cao would execute him, but Cao pardoned Bi and said, "How can a person who shows filial piety towards his loved ones not be loyal towards his lord? This is what I'm looking for." Cao Cao then appointed Bi Chen as the Chancellor (相) of Lu State (魯國).
