= United Nations Partisan Infantry Korea =

1952–1954 Korean War guerrilla unit

United Nations Partisan Infantry Korea 국제연합유격군 / 주한유엔군유격부대
- Active: November 1952–Feb 1954
- Country: United States; South Korea
- Allegiance: United Nations
- Type: Commando
- Part of: United States Far East Command

The United Nations Partisan Infantry Korea (UNPIK; Korean: 국제연합유격군 / 주한유엔군유격부대) was a guerrilla commando unit during the Korean War that was consolidated under the control of United States Far East Command.

The details of the undercover operation were made public by the US Army in 1990. The unit worked deep inside North Korea to gathering military intelligence, conduct clandestine operation, commando style raids to cause chaos, irregular warfare, long-range penetration, recruit and lead guerrilla armies and create confusion in the enemy's rear, search and rescue POWs, and special operations behind enemy lines.

== History ==
- In November 1952: 8240th Army Unit and other guerrilla commando units were redesignated as United Nations Partisan Forces Korea (UNPFK)
- In September 1953: The name changed to United Nations Partisan Infantry Korea (UNPIK)

UNPIK was disbanded in 1954.

== Operations ==
The island Wollaedo in the Yellow Sea was used as a base by pro-Southern partisans during the war. This position was regularly bombarded by Northern artillery on the mainland of Cape Changsan.

In 1952, a group of partisans working together with UNPIK landed on the cape. They successfully took control of and destroyed the artillery site, escaping with small losses.

== See also ==
- Korea Liaison Office
- 8240th Army Unit
- Joint Advisory Commission, Korea
