= Korea Liaison Office =

Korean War American intelligence unit

- Active: June 1, 1949 – July 1951
- Country: United States
- Type: Military intelligence unit
- Role: Clandestine operations Special reconnaissance Guerrilla warfare
- Size: Estimated 1,000 to 6,000
- Part of: United States Far East Command
- Engagements: Korean War: Battle of Incheon

The Korea Liaison Office (KLO) was an American military intelligence unit composed primarily of South Koreans. It operated between June 1, 1949 and July 1951.

The agency was founded and operated by the United States Army, but most of its agents were South Korean. Many of its early agents came from the right-wing group the White Shirts Society. The KLO conducted a wide array of intelligence gathering and clandestine operations, including training and sending spies to North Korea. After the outbreak of the Korean War, it began conducting more guerrilla operations.

It was absorbed into the Far East Command Liaison Group (FEC/LG), cover name 'the 442nd Counterintelligence Corps detachment'

On 26 July 1951, the Far East Command Liaison Group (FEC/LG) was dissolved, and much of the KLO's personnel and assets moved to the 8240th Army Unit under new Far East Command Liaison Detachment, Korea (FEC/LD (K)).

== Background ==
At the end of World War II, Korea was divided along the 38th parallel. In the north was the Soviet Union-backed Soviet Civil Administration and eventually North Korea. In the south was the United States-backed United States Army Military Government in Korea (USAMGIK) and eventually South Korea.

Around the late 1940s, the United States determined that South Korea was sufficiently stable, and began to withdraw the occupational XXIV Corps. By January 25, 1949, the Corps left the peninsula and was replaced by the 5th Regimental Combat Team and the Korean Military Advisory Group (KMAG). KMAG's primary purpose was to assist the Korean government and Republic of Korea Army, but it also engaged in some intelligence activities. However, it was eventually determined that their intelligence capabilities needed to be increased in order to monitor increased troop movements in the North.

The Chief of Intelligence of the United States Far East Command (FECOM), Charles A. Willoughby, was assigned to this task. Around February, Willoughby had someone contact Yeom Dong-jin, the leader of the right-wing militant group the White Shirts Society (WSS), for his assistance in forming the group. Many members of the WSS joined the KLO in the following year.

== History ==
On June 1, 1949, the Korea Liaison Office (KLO) was established in Seoul. Its founding leader was Lieutenant Colonel Leonard Abbott, although Willoughby maintained key contacts in the group.

Far East Command (FECOM) instructed South Korea's Higher Intelligence Department to recruit and train South Korean peasants for the KLO as spies to infiltrate the North. The KLO established a number of safehouses to serve as bases and training areas for these spies. Around 20% of its members were women, and children also served as agents, as they were believed to blend in better. However, its missions had a high failure rate; around 80% of its operatives were killed in action.

Part of the issue was how the KLO sent its spies to the North. They either airdropped them ("Aviary operations") or had them sneak across the then fortified border. Both methods were flawed; the airdrops often resulted in the targets landing miles away from their intended target, and the border was heavily guarded. In August 1950, they proposed enlisting the help of the Navy and using boats, but the Navy was unwilling to cooperate. They abandoned this effort by September. The spies managed to gather a significant amount of concrete information from the North. It sent over the transcripts of secret speeches that Kim Il Sung delivered to his officers, as well as the movements of troops and conditions of infrastructure in the North.

Soon afterwards, an American member of the KLO determined that the North was on the verge of invading the South, and reported this to his superiors, but his reports were treated skeptically. The KLO continued warning of an invasion right until the outbreak of the Korean War on June 25, 1950, which is generally agreed to have caught the U.S. by surprise. From June 1 to June 24 alone, it produced 1,195 intelligence reports. In 1998, the scholar Myunglim Park examined some of these reports and determined their accuracy to be higher than those produced by other organizations, although Park was not able to gain access to reports after the beginning of the war. Despite the KLO's correct prediction, it and other intelligence organizations continued to receive skeptical treatment.

=== Korean War ===
In August 1950, by this point, it had around 1,000 to 6,000 members.

In September 1950, KLO took part in Operation Trudy Jackson for Incheon Landing.

After the Chinese People's Volunteer Army joined the war in October 1950, UN Forces began a chaotic retreat south. During this period, United Nations Command turned towards intelligence organizations, including the KLO, for intelligence. But the KLO did not have any agents in the area, nor did it have radios. In desperation, the KLO airdropped twelve two-man teams with smoke grenades to signal where enemy troops were present. Only a few smoke signals were seen, and none reported the presence of enemies.

On December 20, the Army activated the 442nd Counterintelligence Corps detachment, which assumed operational control over the KLO and division-level TLOs. The 442nd was able to procure boats for the KLO.

In January 1951, FECOM tasked Colonel John H. McGee of the Eighth Army with reorienting the KLO towards more tactical instead of intelligence operations. To this end, the Eight Army began establishing Tactical Liaison Offices (TLO) in various locations. These TLO offices trained operatives who initially largely conducted offensive operations, although they moved more towards intelligence roles in the later parts of the war.

=== Far East Command Liaison Detachment, Korea ===
In July 1951, the various sides began discussing an armistice. These talks eventually led to the 1953 Korean Armistice Agreement and the end of active combat in the Korean War.

On July 26, the US Army reorganized its intelligence organizations and deactivated the Far East Command Liaison Group (FEC/LG). This brought an end to the KLO, although many of its personnel, operations, and assets were transferred to the 8240th Army Unit under the new Far East Command Liaison Detachment, Korea (FEC/LD (K))

By the fall, many of the former KLO's tactics were improved upon. The FEC/LD (K) and Eighth Army established long-term positions behind enemy lines. There, agents communicated via radio and received supplies from airdrops. The two organizations also established bases on islands along the west coast of Korea, where they would launch "Salamander operations": the use of boats to deploy and retrieve agents. They also continued Aviary operations, although they adopted the tactic of deploying agents close to enemy lines, and having them disguised as North Korean soldiers. These factors significantly improved the success rate of missions.

On December 10, 1951, a new theater-level organization for intelligence operations was created: the Combined Command for Reconnaissance Activities, Korea (CCRAK). As part of this, the FEC/LD/K was given more partisan and psychological warfare missions. It was also expanded; it went from 150 personnel in February 1952 to 450 in summer 1953. By this point, they had 2,100 agents, with seventeen positions in the North.

However, according to military historian John Patrick Finnegan, their agents in the North produced limited results, and nothing indicates that they ever supplied significant intelligence on enemy plans. Despite this, their intelligence was highly valued, as the Army had significantly fewer prisoners of war to rely on for information by this point.

== Legacy ==
=== Effectiveness ===
The U.S.'s inability to predict both the North's invasion and the Chinese entrance into the Korean War has remained a subject of academic analysis for decades. Finnegan argues that the KLO and FECOMLDK produced intelligence of "highly mixed value" and that it was merely seen as better than having no intelligence operations, although their work improved after the stalemate. He also notes that, unlike in the European theater of World War II, Koreans had little experience with modern intelligence operations, and received extremely little training before deployment. In addition, translators (in both Korean and Chinese) had long been in significantly short supply even before the war.

=== Compensation controversy ===
Many agents were not paid wages, and the ones that did received very low pay. Families of deceased agents were also not paid any compensation, and agents who died while serving did not receive honors or recognition from the South Korean government. This issue was brought to national attention in 2000, when it was presented to the National Assembly. In 2004, veterans of the KLO petitioned the U.S. government for compensation, but their request was rejected on the grounds that they were not legally considered members of the U.S. Armed Forces. In January 2004, the South Korean government passed a law to compensate South Korean agents, but the KLO veterans were exempted from this, as they were considered agents of the United States.

Finally, in April 2021, the South Korean government passed the Act to Compensate Irregular Servicemen During the Korean War. Under this, around 4,800 groups of surviving veterans or their families would each receive ₩10 million ($8,900), and deceased veterans would be honored. The delayed timing and amount of money provided were both criticized. By this point, around 100 veterans were still alive, with many well over 80 years old.

== See also ==
- 8240th Army Unit
- Joint Advisory Commission, Korea
- United Nations Partisan Infantry Korea
