= Chang Hyŏn'gwang =

Korean scholar-politician (1554–1637)

- Hangul: 장현광
- Hanja: 張顯光
- RR: Jang Hyeongwang
- MR: Chang Hyŏn'gwang

Art name
- Hangul: 여헌
- Hanja: 旅軒
- RR: Yeoheon
- MR: Yŏhŏn

Courtesy name
- Hangul: 덕회
- Hanja: 德晦
- RR: Deokhoe
- MR: Tŏkhoe

Chang Hyŏn'gwang (Korean: 장현광; Hanja: 張顯光; 1554 – September 15, 1637) was a Korean politician and educator, as well as a Neo-Confucian scholar of the Joseon dynasty. He was the disciple of Chŏng Ku and the teacher of Hŏ Mok and Yun Hyu. His art name was Yŏhŏn (여헌).

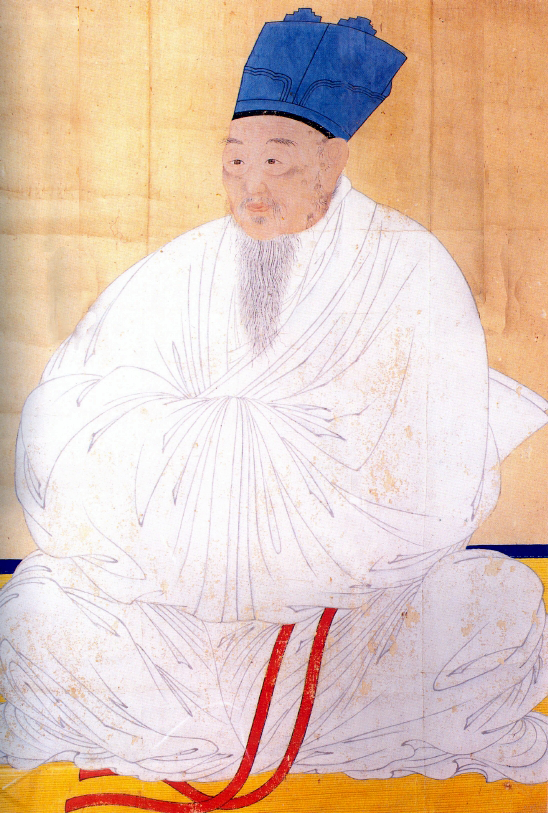
Portrait of Chang Hyŏn'gwang (c. 18th century)

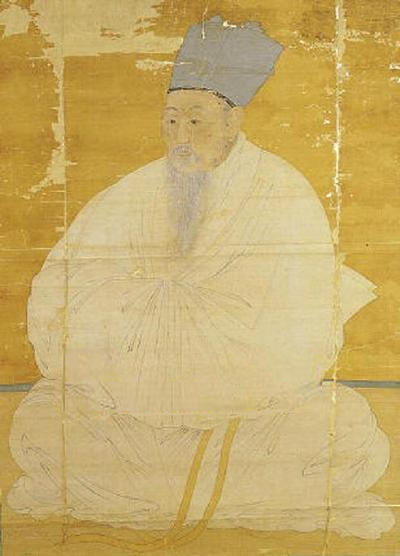
Portrait of Chang Hyŏn'gwang (1633)

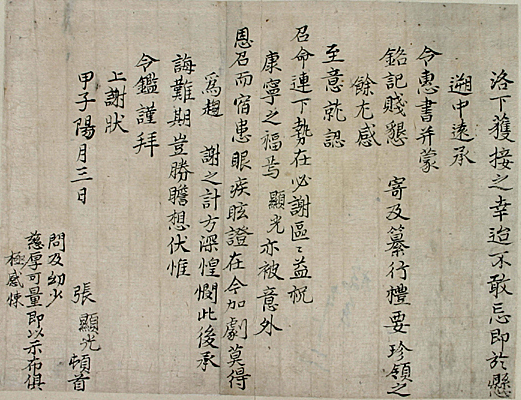
Letter of Chang Hyŏn'gwang (March 1, 1624)

== Books ==
- Yŏhŏn chip (여헌집, 旅軒集)
- Yŏkhak tosŏl (역학도설, 易學圖說)
- Sŏngni sŏl (성리설, 性理說)
- Yongsa ilgi (용사일기, 龍蛇日記)

== See also ==
- Yi Hwang
- Cho Sik
- Chŏng Ku
- Yi I
- Sŏng Hon
- Yi Ŏnjŏk
- Hŏ Mok
- Yun Sŏndo
- Yun Hyu
- Yi Seowoo
