= Kim Seok-ju =

Scholar and politician (1634–1684)

- Hangul: 김석주
- Hanja: 金錫冑
- RR: Gim Seokju
- MR: Kim Sŏkchu

Art name
- Hangul: 식암
- Hanja: 息庵
- RR: Sikam
- MR: Sigam

Courtesy name
- Hangul: 사백
- Hanja: 斯百
- RR: Sabaek
- MR: Sabaek

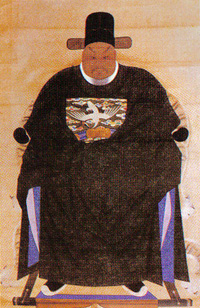
Kim Seok-ju

Kim Seok-ju (Korean: 김석주; Hanja: 金錫冑, 1634 – September 20, 1684) was a Korean Neo-Confucian scholar, politician and writer of the Joseon Kingdom. His art name was Sigam (Korean: 식암; Hanja: 息庵), and his courtesy name was Sabaek (Korean: 사백; Hanja: 斯百). He was a cousin of Queen Myunseong. He was Chief State Councillor of the Joseon Kingdom in 1680.

== Books ==
- 'Shikamjip' (식암집; 息庵集)
- 'Beolgo' (별고; 別稿)
- 'Haedongsabu' (해동사부; 海東辭賦)
- 'Shikamyugo' (식암유고; 息菴遺稿)
- 'Hanggunsooji' (행군수지; 行軍須知)
- 'Gomunbaiksun' (고문백선; 古文白選)
- 'Hangoojasu' (한구자수; 韓構字藪)
- Chunsojhajipseomun (춘소자집 서문; 春沼子集 序文)

== See also ==
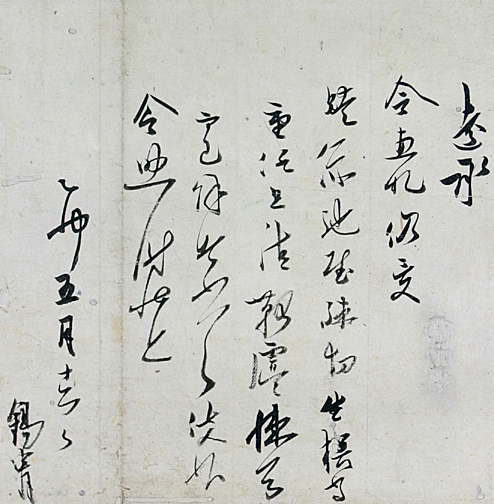
Letter of Sikam Kim Seok-ju

- Song Si-yŏl
- Yun Sŏndo
- Hong Uwŏn
- Kim Ik-hun
- Kim Manjung
- Kim Yuk
- Kim Woo-myung
- Song Chun-gil
