= Song Ikp'il =

Korean scholar (1534–1599)

- Hangul: 송익필
- Hanja: 宋翼弼
- RR: Song Ikpil
- MR: Song Ikp'il

Art name
- Hangul: 구봉, 현승
- Hanja: 龜峰, 玄繩
- RR: Gubong, Hyeonseung
- MR: Kubong, Hyŏnsŭng

Courtesy name
- Hangul: 운장
- Hanja: 雲長
- RR: Unjang
- MR: Unjang

Posthumous name
- Hangul: 문경
- Hanja: 文敬
- RR: Mungyeong
- MR: Mun'gyŏng

Song Ikp'il (Korean: 송익필; Hanja: 宋翼弼; February 10, 1534 – August 8, 1599) was a Korean politician and Neo-Confucian scholar and educator of the Joseon period. His art names were Kubong (구봉; 龜峰) and Hyŏnsŭng (현승; 玄繩), and his courtesy name was Unjang (운장; 雲長). Song was best friends of Yi I, Sŏng Hon and Chŏng Ch'ŏl and taught Kim Jang-saeng.

== Publications ==
- Kubong chip (구봉집; 龜峰集)
- Hyŏnsŭng chip (현승집; 玄繩集)
- Karye chusŏl (가례주설; 家禮註說)
- Hyŏnsŭng p'yŏn (현승편; 玄繩編)

== See also ==
- Yi I
- Sŏng Hon
- Kim Jang-saeng
- An Pangjun
- Kim Jip
