= Gwon Sang-ha =

Neo-Confucian scholar (1641–1712)

Kwon Sang-ha 권상하
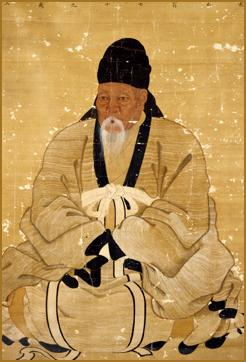

Left State Councillor
- In office November 6, 1717 – March 14, 1720
- Preceded by: Yi I-myeong
- Succeeded by: Yi Geo-myeong

Right State Councillor
- In office June 20, 1717 – November 6, 1717
- Preceded by: Yi I-myeong
- Succeeded by: Cho Tae-chae

Personal details
- Born: 1641
- Died: September 2, 1721 (aged 79–80)

Korean name
- Hangul: 권상하
- Hanja: 權尙夏
- RR: Gwon Sangha
- MR: Kwŏn Sangha

Art name
- Hangul: 수암, 한수재
- Hanja: 遂菴, 寒水齋
- RR: Suam, Hansujae
- MR: Suam, Hansujae

Courtesy name
- Hangul: 치도
- Hanja: 致道
- RR: Chido
- MR: Ch'ido

Posthumous name
- Hangul: 문순
- Hanja: 文純
- RR: Munsun
- MR: Munsun

Gwon Sang-ha (1641 – September 2, 1712) was a politician and Neo-Confucian scholar of Joseon Dynasty. He was a member of Westerners party (Seoin; 서인, 西人) and the second head of the political faction Noron (노론; 老論). His pennames were Suam and Hansujae.

He was a disciple of Song Jun-gil, and the ideological successor of Song Si-yeol.

== Family ==
- Father
  - Kwon Gyeok (권격; 權格; 1620–1671)
- Mother
  - Lady Yi of the Hampyeong Yi clan (함평 이씨); daughter of Yi Cho-ro (이초로; 李楚老)
- Sibling(s)
  - Younger brother - Kwon Sang-myeong (권상명; 勸尙明; 1652–1684)
  - Younger brother - Kwon Sang-yu (권상유; 權尙游; 1656–1724)
- Wive and issue
  - Lady Yi (이씨; 李氏); daughter of Yi Jung-hoe (이중휘; 李重輝)
    - Son - Kwon Ok (권욱; 權煜; 1658–1717)
      - Grandson - Kwon Yang-seong (권양성; 權養性; 1675–1746)
      - Grandson - Kwon Jeong-seong (권정성; 權定性)
      - Granddaughter - Lady Kwon of the Andong Kwon clan (안동 권씨; 安東 權氏; 1687–1723); Hwang Jae’s first wife

== Works ==
- Hansujaejip (한수재집; 寒水齋集)
- Samseojibui (삼서집의; 三書輯疑)
- Gibaegitaeyeonpyo (기백이태연표 箕伯李泰淵表)
- Hyeongchamgwongeukhwapyo (형참권극화표 刑參權克和表)
- Busagwaisukpyo (부사과이숙표 副司果李塾表)

== See also ==
- Song Siyeol
- Song Jun-gil
- Yun Jeung
- Kim Jip
- Yun Seon-geo
- Yun Sŏndo
