= Kim Jang-saeng =

Korean scholar (1548–1631)

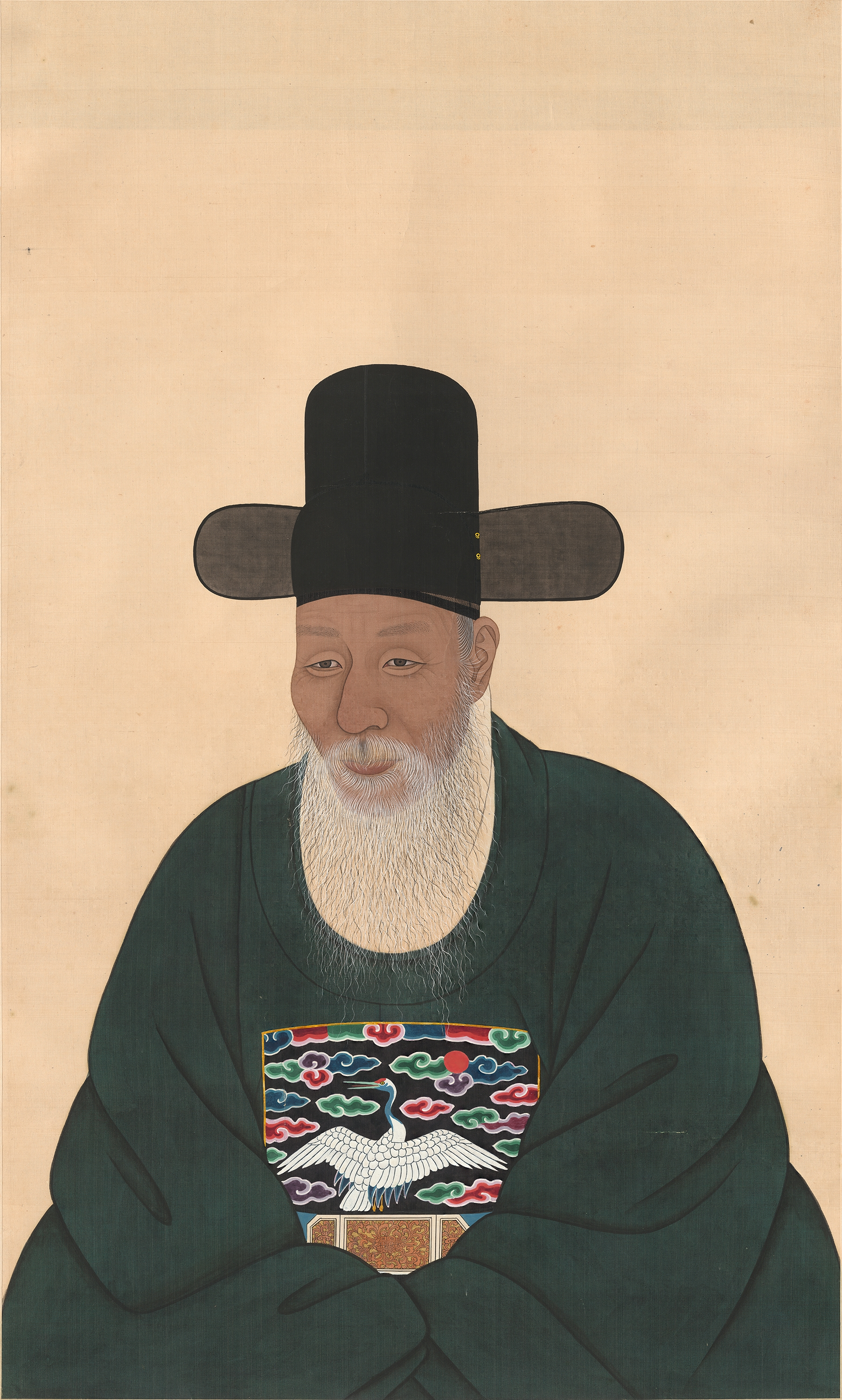

Korean name
- Hangul: 김장생
- Hanja: 金長生
- RR: Gim Jangsaeng
- MR: Kim Changsaeng

Art name
- Hangul: 사계
- Hanja: 沙溪
- RR: Sagye
- MR: Sagye

Courtesy name
- Hangul: 희원, 희지
- Hanja: 希元, 希之
- RR: Huiwon, Huiji
- MR: Hŭiwŏn, Hŭiji

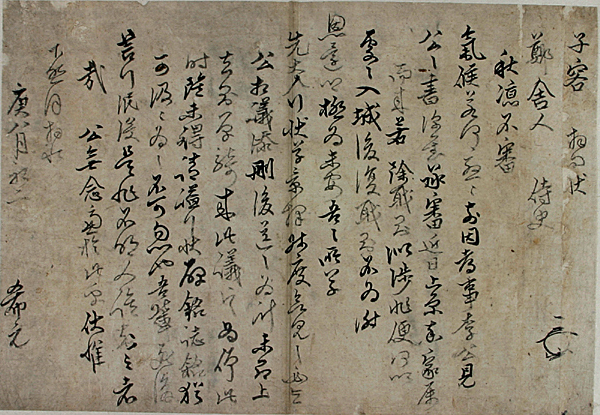
Letter of Kim Jang-saeng

Kim Jang-saeng (Korean: 김장생; Hanja: 金長生; July 8, 1548 – August 3, 1631) was a Neo-Confucian scholar, politician, educator, and writer of Korea's Joseon period.

He was the successor to the Neo-Confucian academic tradition of Yulgok Yi I and Sŏng Hon.

== Family ==
- Father
  - Kim Gye-hwi (김계휘; 金繼輝; 1526–1582)
- Mother
  - Lady Shin of the Pyeongsan Shin clan (평산 신씨; 1533–1618)
- Siblings
  - Younger sister - Lady Kim of the Gwangsan Kim clan (광산 김씨; 光山 金氏)
  - Younger half-brother - Kim Ui-sun (김의손; 金義孫)
  - Younger half-brother - Kim Yeon-sun (김연손; 金燕孫)
  - Younger half-brother - Kim Gyeong-sun (김경손; 金慶孫)
  - Younger half-brother - Kim Pyeong-sun (김평손; 金平孫)
  - Younger half-sister - Lady Kim of the Gwangsan Kim clan (광산 김씨; 光山 金氏)
  - Younger half-sister - Lady Kim of the Gwangsan Kim clan (광산 김씨; 光山 金氏); Kim Sang-yong's second wife
- Wives and their children
  - Lady Jo of the Changnyeong Jo clan (창녕 조씨; 昌寧 曺氏; 1551–1586)
    - Son - Kim Eun (김은; 金檃)
    - Son - Kim Jib (김집; 金集; 1574–1656)
    - Son - Kim Ban (김반; 金槃)
  - Lady Kim of the Suncheon Kim clan (순천 김씨; 順天 金氏)
  - Unnamed concubine
    - 4 unnamed children

== See also ==
- Gwangsan Kim clan
- Kim Jip
- Queen Ingyeong
- Kim Manjung
- Kim Ik-hun
- Song Jun-gil
- Song Si-yeol
- Yun Hyu
- Yun Jeung
- Queen Inseon
