= Song Chun-gil =

Korean politician (1606–1672)

- Korean name
- Hangul: 송준길
- Hanja: 宋浚吉
- RR: Song Jungil
- MR: Song Chun'gil

Art name
- Hangul: 동춘, 동춘당
- Hanja: 同春, 同春堂
- RR: Dongchun, Dongchundang
- MR: Tongch'un, Tongch'undang

Posthumous name
- Hangul: 문정
- Hanja: 文正
- RR: Munjeong
- MR: Munjŏng

Song Chun-gil (Korean: 송준길; Hanja: 宋浚吉; 28 December 1606 – 2 December 1672), also known by his art name Tongch'undang, was a Korean politician and Neo-Confucian scholar, who lived during the Joseon period.

Born in Okcheon, North Chungcheong Province, he was the best friend and a distant relative of Song Si-yol. His daughter, Lady Song, was the mother of Queen Inhyeon, who would become the second wife of King Sukjong.

== Relations with the Royal Family ==
Song Chun-gil's descendants through his second daughter had made him the maternal grandfather of Min Jin-hu, Min Jin-won, and Queen Inhyeon. He eventually became the 5th great-grandfather of Empress Myeongseong and the 6th great-grandfather of Empress Sunmyeong.

When Empress Myeongseong became Queen, she also close connections to the families of her 5th maternal great-grandmother (Eunjin Song clan), and 4th maternal great-grandmother (Jinju Jeong clan).

== Family ==
- Father
  - Song Yi-ch'ang (송이창; 宋爾昌; 1561 – May 1627)
- Mother
  - Lady Kim of the Gwangsan Kim clan (광산 김씨; 光山 金氏; 1561–1621); daughter of Kim Eun-hwi (김은휘) and cousin of Kim Jang-saeng
- Wives and their issue
  - Lady Kim (김씨; 金氏) — no issue.
  - Lady Chŏng of the Jinju Chŏng clan (진주 정씨; 晋州 鄭氏; 1604–1655); daughter of Chŏng Kyŏng-se (정경세, 鄭經世; 1563–1633)
    - Son: Song Kwang-sik (송광식; 宋光栻; 1620–1664)
    - Son: Song Sŏk-tae (송석대; 宋碩大; 1625 – ?)
    - Daughter: Lady Song of the Eunjin Song clan (은진 송씨; 恩津 宋氏; 1628–1662)
    - Daughter: Internal Princess Consort Eunseong of the Eunjin Song clan (은성부부인 은진 송씨; 恩城府夫人 恩津 宋氏; 1637–1672); Min Yu-chung's second wife
    - Daughter: Lady Song of the Eunjin Song clan (은진 송씨; 恩津 宋氏; 1639 – ?)
    - Daughter: Lady Song of the Eunjin Song clan (은진 송씨; 恩津 宋氏; 1641 – ?)
- Concubines and their issue
  - Yi Rang, Lady Yi (이랑 이씨; 李娘 李氏; 1610–1631); daughter of Yi Tong-hyŏng (이동형; 1580 – ?) — no issue.
  - Lady Min of the Yeoheung Min clan (여흥 민씨; 驪興 閔氏; 1644–1712); daughter of Min Kyu (민규)
    - Son: Song Kwang-rim (송광림; 1666 – ?)
    - Son: Song Kwang-chŏng (송광정; 宋光挺; 1668–1734)
    - Son: Song Kwang-yŏng (송광영; 1670 – ?)
    - Son: Song Pyŏng-ik (송병익; 1677 – ?)

== Works ==
- Eorokhae (어록해; 語錄解)
- Dongchundangjip (동춘당집)

== See also ==
- Kim Man-jung
- Kim Jip
- Kim Yuk
- Gwon Sang-ha
- Hŏ Mok
- Yun Hyu
- Yun Sŏndo
- Hong Uwŏn

== Site web ==
- Song Jungil:Naver (in Korean)
- Song Jungil (in Korean)
- Song Jungil:Korean historical people information (in Korean)
