= Gwangsan Kim clan =

Korean clan from Gwangju

- Country: North and South Korea
- Current region: Gwangju
- Founder: Kim Hŭng-gwang
- Website: kwangsankim.co.kr

The Gwangsan Kim clan (Korean: 광산 김씨; Hanja: 光山 金氏) is a Korean clan with its bon-gwan located in Gwangsan, present-day Gwangju.

The members of the Gwangsan Kim clan are the descendants of Kim Hŭng-gwang (Korean: 김흥광; Hanja: 金興光), the third son of King Sinmu of Silla, the 45th monarch of the Silla.

The family has produced eminent Neo-Confucian scholars during the Joseon Dynasty, including Kim Jang-saeng, Kim Jip, and Kim Man-jung.

Due to the fact that the location of its origin used to be called (Korean: 광주; Hanja: 光州), the clan was historically also referred to as the Gwangju Kim clan (Korean: 광주 김씨; Hanja: 光州 金氏).

== Joseon Dynasty ==
- Kim Jang-saeng (1548–1631), Joseon Neo-Confucian scholar, politician, and writer
- Kim Tŏngnyŏng (1567–1596), Joseon Imjin War general
- Kim Jip (1574–1656), Joseon Neo-Confucian scholar, politician, and writer
- Kim Man-jung (1637–1692), Korean novelist and politician
- Queen Ingyeong (1661–1680), Joseon queen consort

== Known descendants ==
- Maria Kim (1891–1944), Korean independence activist
- Stephen Kim Sou-hwan (1922–2009), South Korean cardinal
- Kim Yong-san (1922–2011), South Korean businessman
- Kim Chunsu (1922–2004), South Korean poet
- Kim Yong Sop (1936–2020), South Korean historian
- Kim Woo-choong (1936–2019), South Korean businessman
- Kim Yong-gun (born 1946), South Korean actor
- Hyginus Kim Hee-jong (born 1947), South Korean Roman Catholic prelate
- Kim Jang-soo (born 1948), South Korean general and politician
- Do-ol (born Kim Yong-ok, 1948), South Korean academic
- Kim Hwang-sik (born 1948), South Korean politician
- Kim Kap-soo (born 1957), South Korean actor
- Kim Eung-soo (born 1961), South Korean actor
- Kim Seon-dong (politician, born 1963), South Korean politician
- Kim Sang-joong (born 1965), South Korean actor
- Kim Soo-ro (born 1970), South Korean actor
- Kim Taek-soo (born 1970), South Korean table tennis player
- Suki Kim (born 1970), Korean-American journalist and writer
- Kim Myung-min (born 1972), South Korean actor
- Kim Tae-ho (television director) (born 1975), South Korean television director
- Eugene (actress) (born Kim Yoo-jin, 1981), South Korean actress and singer
- Hyun Bin (born Kim Tae-pyung, 1982), South Korean actor
- Kim Ah-joong (born 1982), South Korean actress
- Paul Kim (musician, born 1988), South Korean singer-songwriter
- Uee (born Kim Yu-jin, 1988), South Korean actress
- Solar (singer) (born Kim Yong-sun, 1991), South Korean singer, member of girl group Mamamoo
- Jin (singer) (born Kim Seok-jin, 1992), South Korean singer, member of boy band BTS
- V (singer) (born Kim Tae-hyung, 1995), South Korean singer, member of boy band BTS

== See also ==
- Kim Jang-saeng
- Kim Jip
- Queen Ingyeong
- Kim Man-jung
- Kim Ik-hun
