= Kim Yuk =

Korean scholar-official (1580–1658)

Kim Yuk 김육
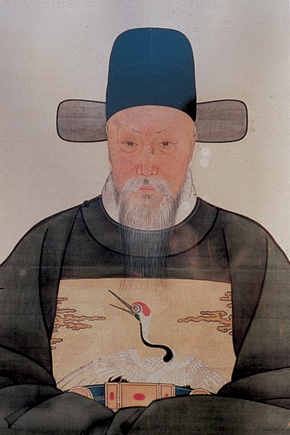

Chief State Councillor
- In office 15 August 1655 – 25 August 1655
- Preceded by: Yi Si-baek
- Succeeded by: Yi Si-baek
- In office 1 January 1651 – 17 January 1652
- Preceded by: Yi Gyeong-yeo
- Succeeded by: Jeong Tae-hwa

Left State Councillor
- In office 17 January 1652 – 23 July 1654
- Preceded by: Yi Si-baek
- Succeeded by: Yi Si-baek

Right State Councillor
- In office 6 October 1649 – 25 February 1650
- Preceded by: Cho Ik
- Succeeded by: Cho Ik

Personal details
- Born: 23 August 1580
- Died: 1 October 1658 (aged 78)

Korean name
- Hangul: 김육
- Hanja: 金堉
- RR: Gim Yuk
- MR: Kim Yuk

Art name
- Hangul: 잠곡, 회정당
- Hanja: 潛谷, 晦靜堂
- RR: Jamgok, Hoejeongdang
- MR: Chamgok, Hoejŏngdang

Courtesy name
- Hangul: 백후
- Hanja: 伯厚
- RR: Baekhu
- MR: Paekhu

Kim Yuk (Korean: 김육; Hanja: 金堉; 1580 – September 1658) was a Korean Neo-Confucian scholar, politician and writer of the Korean Joseon Dynasty. His art name was Chamgok (잠곡) and Hoejŏngdang (회정당), his courtesy name was Paekhu (백후), and his posthumous name was Munjŏng (문정; 文貞). He came from the Cheongpung Kim clan (청풍 김씨; 淸風金氏).

Kim Yuk served as the Chief State Councillor of the Joseon dynasty in 1651 and 1654 through 1658. He was grandfather of Queen Myeongseong.

== Biography ==
=== Family history ===
Kim Yuk was born on July 14, 1580, at Mapo, Hanyang (modern Seoul), where his maternal grandparents lived. His great-great-grandfather Kim Sik (김식, 金湜, 1482–1520), who had supported Cho Kwangjo at Sungkyunkwann (National Confucian Academy) by criticizing then ministers in power, was sacrificed during the literati purge in the year of Kimyo (기묘사화, 己卯士禍, 1519). After the incident, his family including his father, Kim Heung-wu, were excluded from the central government.

Thanks to his family background, however, Kim Yuk had the opportunity to be taught by famous scholars Sŏng Hon and Yi I, and had a close relationship with Kim Sangyong and Kim Sanghŏn, who became the Neo-Confucian leaders and part of the power elite after a couple of decades. In fact, Kim Yuk's mother was the granddaughter of a brother of Cho Kwangjo.

=== Early life ===
From childhood, Kim Yuk was considered a prodigy as he had learned by heart the whole Thousand Character Classic at the age of five. In 1588, his grandfather, Kim Pi (김비; 金棐) was appointed as head of Kangdong, Pyongan Province, his father moved to Kangdong with family members. There, Kim Yuk was taught by Cho Hoik (조호익/曺好益), who had studied under a great scholar, Yi Hwang and who was currently in exile at Kangdong.

At that time, Kim Yuk was a boy of literature. When he was 12 years old, he wrote some essays and biographies of famous pundits. While he was reading the Learning for Minors (소학; 小學). he was quite impressed by the words of Cheng Hao, "Whoever starts as a public official has an earnest mind to love the objects can help people." He bore in mind that only a public official can help people to live well.

When he was 13 years old, Kim Yuk had to undergo the Imjin war. While he moved to the countryside to seek shelter, he did not stop reading books. During the war, his father died at the age of 31. At the deathbed, his father told him to enhance the family grade by studying hard, and to avoid any liquors. Kim Yuk kept his promise for life. His household deteriorated significantly, and his mother also died. He had to depend on his father's sister for living.

After Kim Yuk passed the jinsagwa (literary licentiate examination) in 1605, which allowed him to enter the Sungkyunkwan as his great-great-grandfather had. In 1610 as a student of the Sungkyunkwan, he submitted the petition to King Gwanghaegun three times to forgive and restore his resentful teacher Sŏng Hon and to reinstate Five Wise Men ousted in the previous literati purge. The next year, he initiated a campaign at the Sungkyunkwan to expel Chŏng Inhong in power from the Registry of Confucian Literati (청금록; 靑襟錄), who had criticized the great scholar Yi Hwang. Contrary to his wish, he was expelled from the institution. He had to move to Jamgok-ri (잠곡리; 潛谷里), Gapeong-gun, Gyeonggi-do, and became a farmer to make a living. He studied harder than before in a self-exile. During that period from 1613 to 1623, Kim Yuk, denying King's pardoning, managed to get along, and experienced and witnessed the real peasant life in the countryside.

=== Royal and public service ===
In 1623, a military coup by the Westerners faction succeeded in dethroning King Gwanghae. And a new King Injo was enthroned. In consequence, the public officials ousted by the previous government returned to the newly organized administration. Kim Yuk in seclusion was the first among them. He was appointed to a post in the State Tribunal. But he was not satisfied with it.

In 1624, Kim Yuk passed the kwagŏ, the literary civil service examination, receiving officially the highest marks. Now, he started his official career both at Hanyang and in the country. During the rebellion by Yi Kwal in 1624, he escorted King Injo to Gongju. After the incident, Kim Yuk served at Eumseong-gun, Chungcheong province and various ministries in the capital city. When he left Eumseong, its inhabitants were thankful of his good governance and erected a commemorative monument.

In January 1627 when Late Jin (later Qing dynasty) mounted up a military pressure on the northern territory of Joseon, Kim Yuk asserted to put the first priority to alleviate the residents' burden by suspending the resident registration law.

In 1632, Kim Yuk was in charge of the funeral service of Dowager Queen Inmok.

=== Diplomatic missions ===
During his public career, Kim Yuk was assigned to the diplomatic mission to visit Beijing, capital city of the Ming dynasty three times. In the winter of 1636, he visited Beijing to pay a seasonal courtesy call (성절사; 聖節使). In Beijing, he heard of the outbreak of the invasion of the Qing Army and the humiliating surrender of King Injo. He was allegedly crying day and night in Beijing. Upon arrival from Beijing, he recorded the diplomatic envoy's diary called Choch'ŏn Ilgi (조천일기; 朝天日記), in which he described the civilized foreign country as well as the corruption of the Ming bureaucrats and confusing atmosphere of the Ming society.

In the winter of 1643 when Crown Prince Sohyeon was taken as a hostage to Shenyang, Kim Yuk was assigned to be held responsible for taking care of the crown prince (원손보양관; 元孫輔養官) at the Qing court. When he returned to Joseon, he tried to get rid of evil practices to care for the diplomatic missions in the northern territory.

== Reformist policy-maker ==
In 1638, he was appointed as the governor of Chungcheong province. After he surveyed the fiscal base of the province and ongoing taxation results, Kim Yuk was convinced the necessity of implementing Daedongbeop (대동법; 大同法) in his jurisdiction. Daedongbeop, which had been enforced in Gyeonggi province since 1608, was purported to replace the taxation in kind like indigenous products to the unitary taxation of rice in a certain amount as explained below.

His public career was represented by reform-oriented policy making. Right after the Jeongmyo invasion by the Late Jin (Qing) army in 1627, Kim Yuk was an advocate to support inhabitants of Pyeongan province and Hwanghae province, which were devastated by the war, to make a living. He proposed to separate the labor work levied on the inhabitants of Pyeongan province and Hwanghae province into ordinary farming and service in the army (병농분리; 兵農分離). He also asserted to cultivate military farms (둔전; 屯田) in the idle land to prepare for another war with enemy to the north.

Nationwide implementation of the said Daedongbeop was Kim Yuk's consistent efforts throughout his career. Once he said, "Colleagues around me laugh at me because what I speak of is only Daedongbeop from the beginning to the end." It was his firm belief based on the real world that Daedongbeop would stabilize the living of common people and ensure the fiscal soundness.

Apart from Daedongbeop, Kim Yuk took it into consideration that:

- the emerging Qing dynasty was mounting up its political and military pressure on Joseon;
- the Qing officials were demanding more and more contributions to their dynasty;
- the inhabitants in the northern territories and other part of the nation were burdened increasingly by tax and labor work in pursuit of Conquer-the-North policy (북벌정책; 北伐政策);
- the whole nation was plagued by such natural disasters each year as drought, flood, storm, earthquake, etc.

Accordingly, Kim Yuk thought it imperative to stabilize the living of common people by curtailing taxation, and to prevent the alienation of public sentiment. He forwarded his thoughts to other public officials as well as King Injo and King Hyojong.

== Daedongbeop as unitary taxation ==
While he served in the administration, Kim Yuk advocated Daedongbeop to be implemented nationwide. As a matter of fact, Daedongbeop was test-implemented at the suggestion of Hahn Baek-gyeom (한백겸; 韓百謙) in the name of Daegong Sumibeop (대공수미법; 貸貢收米法) (Note: Literal meaning is a law or mechanism to lend indigenous products and collect rice instead.) in Gyeonggi Province. The policy proposal was endorsed by then Prime Minister Yi Wŏn-ik (이원익; 李元翼) and came into force in September 1608 by setting up Sŏnhyech'ŏng (선혜청; 宣惠廳) at Hanyang.

Judging from his personal experiences as a peasant at Jamgok-ri and a front-line public official at Eumseong, Chungcheong province, Kim Yuk had got a firm belief that Daedongbeop was the best solution to alleviate the burden of peasants and to prevent corruptive practices of local government officials and merchant-middlemen (방납인; 防納人). A half of fiscal revenues had to be supplemented by indigenous products (공물; 貢物) of the region. Its purport seemed to benefit common people in the country. The problem was the intentional exploitation by the local government officials and merchant-middlemen. Occasionally, they demanded in collusion regional products which were hardly available owing to flood, drought or harmful insects, or even refused the direct provision of farmers on account of defects or quality of goods.

So Kim Yuk's countermeasures included the unitary taxation of 12 mal (말; 斗) per gyeol (결; 結). It may be interpreted as 5 mal by the modern measurement over eight thousand pyeong or 26,450 square meter. It's reasonable for a tax payer. While he served as Governor of Chungcheong province, Kim Yuk realized that it was urgently necessary to replace the indigenous products contribution system (공납제; 貢納制) with Daedongbeop which called for proportionate sharing of rice produced at the farm land.

However, factional interests were divided on the issue of Daedongbeop. If Daedongbeop was implemented nationwide, it was largely to the benefit of farmers and common people. On the contrary, Confucian scholars and wealthy gentlemen in the country could find few benefits from the new system. Local government officials would lose the source of fringe benefits. That's why Daedongbeop failed to be continuously implemented beyond Gyeonggi province. Opponents argued that its nationwide implementation would cause the decrease of fiscal revenues.

Kim Yuk tried to persuade King Hyojong to adopt Daedongbeop. At last in 1651, King Hyojong endorsed Daedongbeop in Chungcheong province. Unavoidably, Kim Yuk was departed from the mainstream bureaucrats represented by Kim Jip (김집; 金集) and Song Si-yeol (송시열; 宋時烈), and caused the separation of anti-Kim Sandang (산당, 山黨, meaning 'the Mountain Party') and pro-Kim Handang (한당, 漢黨, meaning 'the Han River Party'). Kim Yuk was criticized as stubborn to the extreme. Even at his deathbed, he was wishing that Daedongbeop should be expanded to Jeolla province, which was finally completed in 1657 by his successor Seo Pil-won (서필원; 徐必遠), Governor of Jeolla province.

== Other pragmatic policies ==
In addition to Daedongbeop, Kim Yuk stressed on the use of currency or coin. Until then, only rice and cotton cloth were traded in exchange for merchandise. He asserted the circulation of coins would be conducive not only to distribution of goods but also to securing fiscal revenues. In 1651, Sangpyeong Tongbo (상평통보; 常平通寶) was first circulated in the metropolitan area and the Northwestern territory. In this regard, he suggested the government to permit the private persons to develop silver mines across the country.

Kim Yuk was eager to make his thoughts on economy and pragmatic ideas to be realized in real life, for example:

- to use water wheels for irrigation in the farmland;
- to employ big wheel carts for easy transportation;
- to encourage and promote commerce and engineering contrary to conventional thoughts;
- to adopt the Western-style calendar system (시헌력; 時憲曆) (Note: A Jesuit missionary to China, Adam Schall, introduced the Shixian calendar (Book of the Conformity of Time) in 1645. Quite impressed by this new calendar system, Kim Yuk imported it to Joseon.) for the convenience in real life;
- to print and distribute medical and disaster-survival reference books (구황벽온방; 救荒辟瘟方);
- to develop printing business for publishing and distribution of good books (Note: At his request, his sons and grandsons were engaged in printing and publishing the books written by Kim Yuk and other authors' books.)
- to dredge rivers in Hanyang to prevent flood in a rainy season.

== Assessment and legacy ==
Kim Yuk was the best reformist-statesman of the Joseon dynasty. Regardless of the mainstream Neo-Confucianism, he paid attention to how to stabilize the living of common people. It was possible because Kim Yuk had an advantage of the descendant of a famous Kimyo martyr, and he was open-minded to pragmatism rather than philosophically oriented. He knew the limitation of a human being. As a matter of fact, he was taught by Neo-Confucianist Sŏng Hon and belonged to the Westerners faction. But he managed to make a transition bridge to the Silhak school (실학파; 實學派) in the next century.

=== Assessment ===
Sometimes, he was called a Wang Anshi of Joseon by his critics and opponents. Truly, Kim Yuk was an unprecedented statesman of far-sighted view and action in that:

- He saw the current situation after the invasion of foreign armies as a critical moment of the nation;
- He warned the crisis might cause the alienation of common people;
- He suggested the tax burden of common people should be alleviated;
- He asserted the nationwide implementation of Daedongbeop and use of currency would help common people to survive such economic crises;
- He proposed a simple thing like a water wheel, a big wheel cart, and the new calendar system based on the solar system would make the living of people more convenient.

Kim Yuk's thoughts and policies are assessed to have a big influence on the Silhak movement in the 18th century.

=== Legacy ===
Thanks to Kim Yuk's reform, the impoverished state revived and fiscal revenues increased. However, the power elite groups were indulged in factional strife-based disputes on the Confucian courtesy issues over royal funeral services. As the mainstream Neo-Confucianist Song Si-yŏl took power, such pragmatic policy ideas as proposed by Yu Sŏngnyong and Kim Yuk were excluded in governing the nation. In the age of King Yeongjo and King Jeongjo, it seemed the Joseon dynasty and people enjoyed a renaissance.

When King Jeongjo died abruptly in 1800, the maternal relatives of royal family meddled in the policy-making and administration continuously, the Joseon dynasty came near to demise. For the sake of policy-making like Daedongbeop, Kim Yuk sought cooperation from power elite groups regardless of their fractional belonging. Although he belonged to the Westerners faction, he was taught by Cho Hoik from the Southerners faction, and close relationship with other politicians like Kim Se-ryeom, Cho Gyeong, etc. from the Southerners faction.

== Works ==
- 'Chamgok Yugo' (Posthumous Works of Chamgok, 잠곡유고, 潛谷遺稿): Collection of Chamgok's poetry in Chinese, petitions addressed to King, official/private letters and essays, which were edited and published by Kim Yuk's descendant in the 18th century.
- 'Kimyo P'arhyŏn chŏn' (Biographies of Eight Wise Men, 기묘팔현전, 己卯八賢傳): Kim Yuk recorded, and published in 1639, the life, career, achievements, etc. of eight scholars and public officials who had been sacrificed during the purge of literati in the year of Kimyo (기묘사화, 己卯士禍, 1519) including his Great-Great-Grandfather Kim Sik.
- 'Chamgok P'iltam' (Chamgok's communications by writing, 잠곡필담, 潛谷筆談): Essays on what the author saw or heard of while studying, living, serving as a public official.
- 'Yuwŏn Ch'ongbo' (Encyclopedia edited by Chamgok, 유원총보, 類苑叢寶): Encyclopedic reference books condensed and edited by Kim Yuk. Originally, the time-honored encyclopedia of 171 volumes published in China (古今事文類聚) had been read and used for citation by Joseon scholars and gentlemen until many of them were lost during the two wars. In view of difficulties faced with scholars and students at that time, Kim Yuk contributed his time and energy in condensing and editing the original books into 47 volumes.
- 'Songdoji' (Official records of Songdo, 송도지, 松都誌): The history, geography, palaces and castles, population, economy and industry and administration of Songdo (old capital of the Goryeo dynasty, modern Gaeseong), compiled and written by Kim Yuk.
- 'Haedong Myŏngsinnok' (Biographies of Great Scholars and Public Officials of Korea, 해동명신록, 海東名臣錄) modeled after the biographies written by Zhuzi (朱子 宋名臣言行錄): Kim Yuk authored this book in 1651, about over 300 great scholars and government officials of Silla, Goryeo and Joseon.
- 'Hwangmyŏnggiryak' (History of the Ming Dynasty, 황명기략, 皇明紀略) of China compiled by Kim Yuk in 1642.
- 'Chongdŏk Sinp'yŏn' (New Text on Virtues, 종덕신편, 種德新編) modeled after the Learning for Minors. Kim Yuk authored this book in 1644 to educate moral virtues to common people based on the Confucian ethics.

== Gallery ==
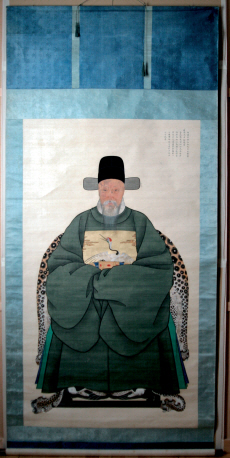
Kim Yuk

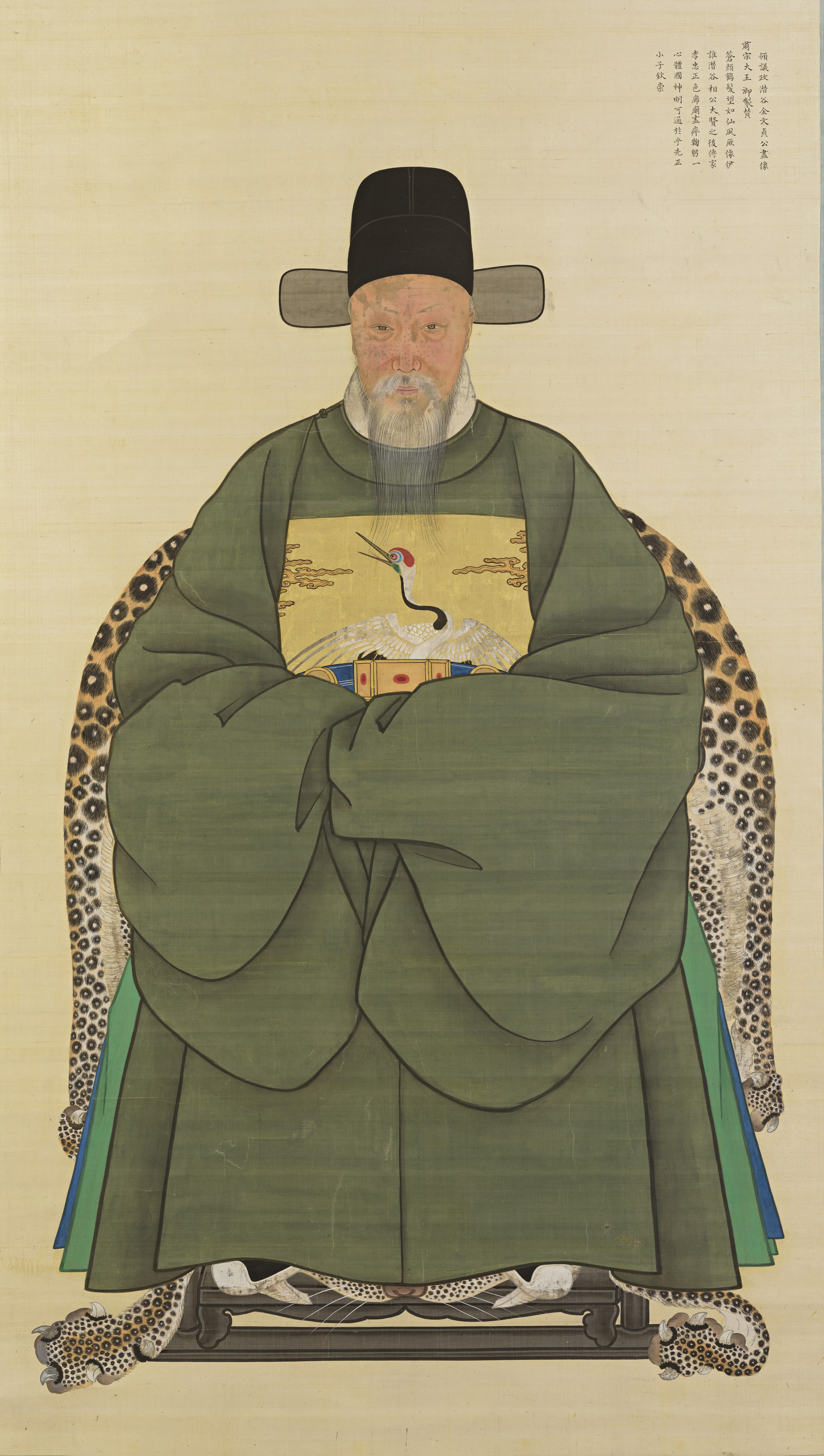
Kim Yuk

== See also ==
- Kim Jip
- An Pangjun
- Queen Myeongseong
- Queen Hyoui
- Yi I
- Sŏng Hon
