= Bojihwayangdong buralsongseonsaeng =

Bilingual pun

- Hangul: 보지화양동 불알송선생
- Hanja: 步之華陽洞 不謁宋先生 or 步之花陽同 不謁宋先生
- Revised Romanization: Bojihwayangdong buralsongseonsaeng
- McCune–Reischauer: Pojihwayangdong puralsongsŏnsaeng

Bojihwayangdong buralsongseonsaeng (Korean: 보지화양동 불알송선생; Hanja: 步之華陽洞 不謁宋先生 or 步之花陽同 不謁宋先生) is a bilingual pun in Classical Chinese and Korean that is considered to be part of the literature of the Joseon period of Korea. It has historically been used as a source of humour in Korean.

== History ==
When Hŏ Mok was ordered to attend the academy of the more senior scholar Song Si-yŏl at Hwayang-dong, he made the journey and was forced to wait for a long time, only to find the appointment had been cancelled. Hŏ Mok angrily stated "bojihwayangdong buralsongseonsaeng".

== Meaning ==
Interpreted as a Korean reading of Classical Chinese, the statement means "Walked to Hwayang-dong; did not see teacher Song", but in native Korean, boji (Korean: 보지) refers to "female genitals", while bural (Korean: 불알) means "testicles", making the expression have a double meaning of "cunt Hwayang-dong; bollocks teacher Song".

== Sources ==
- 정운채, 강미정 외, 문학치료 서사사전 2:설화편(서사와문학치료연구소 문학치료총서 3) (문학과 치료, 2009년)
