= Cheongju Jeong clan =

Korean clan from North Chungcheong Province

- Country: Korea
- Current region: Cheongju
- Founder: Chŏng Kŭkkyŏng
- Connected members: Jeong Gu

The Cheongju Jeong clan (Korean: 청주 정씨; Hanja: 淸州 鄭氏) is a Korean clan. Their bon-gwan is Cheongju, North Chungcheong Province. According to a census from 2015, the population of the Cheongju Jeong clan is 46,419. Their founder was Chŏng Kŭkkyŏng (정극경; 鄭克卿), who was a military officer during the Goryeo dynasty. One of his descendants was the Joseon dynasty Neo-Confucian scholar, Chŏng Ku.

== See also ==
- Jeong (surname)
