= Kim Tŏngnyŏng =

Joseon general (1567–1596)

- Hangul: 김덕령
- Hanja: 金德齡
- RR: Gim Deokryeong
- MR: Kim Tŏngnyŏng

Courtesy name
- Hangul: 경수
- Hanja: 景樹
- RR: Gyeongsu
- MR: Kyŏngsu

Posthumous name
- Hangul: 충장
- Hanja: 忠壯
- RR: Chungjang
- MR: Ch'ungjang

Kim Tŏngnyŏng (Korean: 김덕령; Hanja: 金德齡; 1567–1596) was a Joseon general who notably served during the 1592–1598 Japanese invasions of Korea. His alias was Chungjang. "His life and acts are recorded in Yŏllyŏsil kisul (Narratives of Yŏllyŏsil) and story collections like Tongp'ae naksong (Tales of the Eastern Kingdom for Repeated Recitation) and Taedong kimun (Strange Tales of the Great East)." It is believed that his story is an epic which tells about a national hero who was frustrated.

== Background ==
Kim Tŏngnyŏng was born in Gwangju near Mount Mudeung in 1567 (the first year of King Seonjo's reign). He was born into a low-status family, descended from the Gwangsan Kim clan. His father was Kim Pungsŏp (김붕섭; 金鵬燮) and his mother was Lady Pan from the Nampyeong Pan clan.

According to legend, Kim was strong enough to catch a tiger with his bare hands and chased them to rescue his friends. He also carried a 60 Kg iron hammer on his waist. He commanded as a champion in wrestling competitions across the country, winning all the oxen offered as the prize. Troubled with his boasting, Kim's older sister disguised herself as a man and defeated Kim in a wrestling contest. Later, when Kim learned that he had lost to his sister, he came up with a life and death contest proposal against her. He was given the task of climbing Mt. Mudeung within a day while his sister had to make a coat by weaving hemp. Upon his arrival from the mountain, Kim noticed that his sister had purposely left the coat undone. He then killed his sister after claiming himself as the winner.

Kim was taught by Sŏng Hon from the age of 20. According to legends, Kim's father prepared the tombs for his ancestors on an auspicious location identified by an eminent Chinese geomancer that would produce a hero, after which Kim Tŏngnyŏng was born.

== Military career ==
In 1592, when Japan invaded Korea to subdue the Japanese, Kim raised an army in the cause of justice along with his brother. He reached Jeonju and fends off the Japanese army, who were trying to infiltrate Jeolla Province. However, on his brother's persuasion, Kim returned home to support their mother. In 1593, after his mother's demise, Kim was persuaded to raise an army by Damyang magistrate Yi Kyŏngnin (이경린; 李景麟), and Jangseong County Governor Yi Kwi.

Kim Tŏngnyŏng was honored with the military title of 'Chungyongjang' by King Seonjo with the post of assistant section chief in the Ministry of Justice (형조좌랑; 刑曹佐郞; hyŏngjo chwarang) as he widened his sphere of influence. In 1594, Kim was donned with the title of 'Wing Dragon General' by the prince for his gallantry and ingenuity. He was also bestowed with the military title of 'Joseon General' from King Seonjo.

The period when Kim stayed in Namwon and moved to Jinju, the court integrated all the armies which were raised in the cause of justice across the country into the Chungyong Army to regulate coordinated and organized operations & provisions. Kim Tŏngnyŏng, as the commander of the Chungyong Army, under the leadership of Kwŏn Yul defended the southwestern part of Korea along with Kwak Chaeu. Kim opposed the Japanese army between Jinhae and Goseong to impede their infiltration into the Jeolla province but no remarkable battles were fought as overtures of peace were afoot and also their provisions were insufficient. Out of 3000 soldiers under his command, Kim made 2500 soldiers return to their farms. Kim spurred a campaign and defeated the Japanese army stationed at Geoje Island. In 1595, he also rebutted the Japanese army trying to permeate Goseong.

Although Kim made several preparations for the battle, he got no chance to go to the front because of the peace negotiations. He got himself drunk in a surge of anger and imposed military law too strictly which resulted in innumerable complaints from soldiers and staff officers against him. Kim was then imprisoned in 1596 on the suspicion of flogging Yun Kŭnsu's servant to death but was soon released on to the appeals of Confucian scholars in the Yeongnam Region and the defense of Chŏng T'ak.

In July 1596, Yi Monghak waged an armed rebellion in Hongsan. Kim was arrested along with Ch'oe Tamnyŏn, Kwak Chaeu, Ko Ŏnbaek, and Hong Kyenam on a false accusation of his involvement in the Yi Monghak revolt by Han Hyŏn and Sin Kyŏnghaeng. Later Kim was executed due to the court's wrongful indictment.

In 1661 (2nd year of Hyeonjong's reign), Kim was posthumously rehabilitated, with his ranks reinstated and promoted to the Minister of Defense.

== Death ==
According to the legends, when the Japanese invaded, Kim refused to go to the front. He was then in mourning for his sister and during that period it was a taboo to kill living beings. It is believed that he used his supernatural powers to threaten and drove off the enemies. For this, he was charged with failing to kill his enemies and was produced to the court as a traitor. The court attempted to execute Kim but failed as he was considered to be invulnerable. Later, Kim demanded a plaque from the king that read, "Kim Tŏngnyŏng, Loyal Subject of All Ages", only to reveal his weakness. When his proposal was accepted, he told his executors that he would die if they removed the scales behind his knees and struck him three times. He died in prison after enduring six bouts of severe torture over twenty days.

There are various versions of Kim Tŏngnyŏng's legend.

"Within the oral tradition, Kim Tŏngnyŏng is acknowledged as the top martial hero during the Japanese invasions, and it is believed that Kim was so courageous that if he had been able to engage in battle, he would have easily ended the war."

"Kim's execution due to false accusations is historically accurate and the legend, as an archetype of the tragic historical hero tale, reflects a critical view that the kingdom's ruling class killed a reputed general for political gain."
