= Kim Ik-hun =

Korean politician and general (1619–1689)

- Hangul: 김익훈
- Hanja: 金益勳
- RR: Gim Ikhun
- MR: Kim Ikhun

Art name
- Hangul: 광남
- Hanja: 光南
- RR: Gwangnam
- MR: Kwangnam

Courtesy name
- Hangul: 무숙
- Hanja: 懋叔
- RR: Musuk
- MR: Musuk

Kim Ik-hun (Korean: 김익훈; Hanja: 金益勳, 1619 – March 11, 1689) was a Korean politician, a general, and part of the noble class during the Joseon period. His art name was Gwangnam (광남; 光南) and his courtesy name was Mu-suk (무숙; 懋叔).

== Biography ==
Kim Ik-hun was born in 1619. He was the son of Kim Ban, the grandson of Kim Jang-saeng and a member of the Gwangsan Kim clan.

Due to Eumseo (음서; an appointment to a government position due to having a honored, recognized, and notable father or grandfather who served his country) he was appointed to Geombudosa (의금부도사; 義禁府都事) and also appointed to the mayor of Namwon (남원부사; 南原府使). He became Saboksichumjeong (사복시첨정; 司僕寺僉正). In 1667, he became Sadosijeong (사도시정; 司導寺正)

In 1678, he was the mayor of Gwangju (광주부윤; 廣州府尹), then became a general in the department of Eoyeong (어영대장). He also became the Jeolla provincial army commander (전라도병마절도사). In 1680, he was again reappointed as the mayor of Gwangju and then was dismissed.

On March 11, 1689, he was murdered by the Southerners at age 70.

== Family ==
- Grandfather Kim Jang-saeng
  - Uncle Kim Jip
  - Father Kim Ban
    - Brother Kim Ik-gyeom
  - Mother Lady Seo

== See also ==
- Kim Jang-saeng
- Kim Jip
- Sukjong of Joseon
- Kim Seok-ju
- Queen Ingyeong
- Kim Manjung
- Gwangsan Kim clan
