= Bogildo Yun Seondo garden =

South Korean historical landmark

Bogildo Yun Seondo garden or grove (보길도 윤선도 원림) is a cultural property on the island of Bogildo. It is where Yun Seondo, the civilian courtier, poet, and scholar from the Joseon period, spent his final days.

Administratively, tt is located in Buhwang-ri, Bogil-myeon, Wando-gun. First designated as South Korea's Historical Site No. 369 on January 11, 1992, it was redesignated as South Korea's Place of Scenic Beauty No. 34 on January 8, 2008.

== History ==
Yun Seondo Wonrim (‘Grove’) on Bogildo presents the major garden style of the Joseon period (조선). Yun Seondo (1589–1671), who was heading to Jeju Island due to the Qing dynasty Invasion of Joseon, was fascinated by the local scenic beauty and settled there, where he created his outstanding Sino-Korean poetry including <Eobusasisa (어부사시사; 漁父四時詞)>.

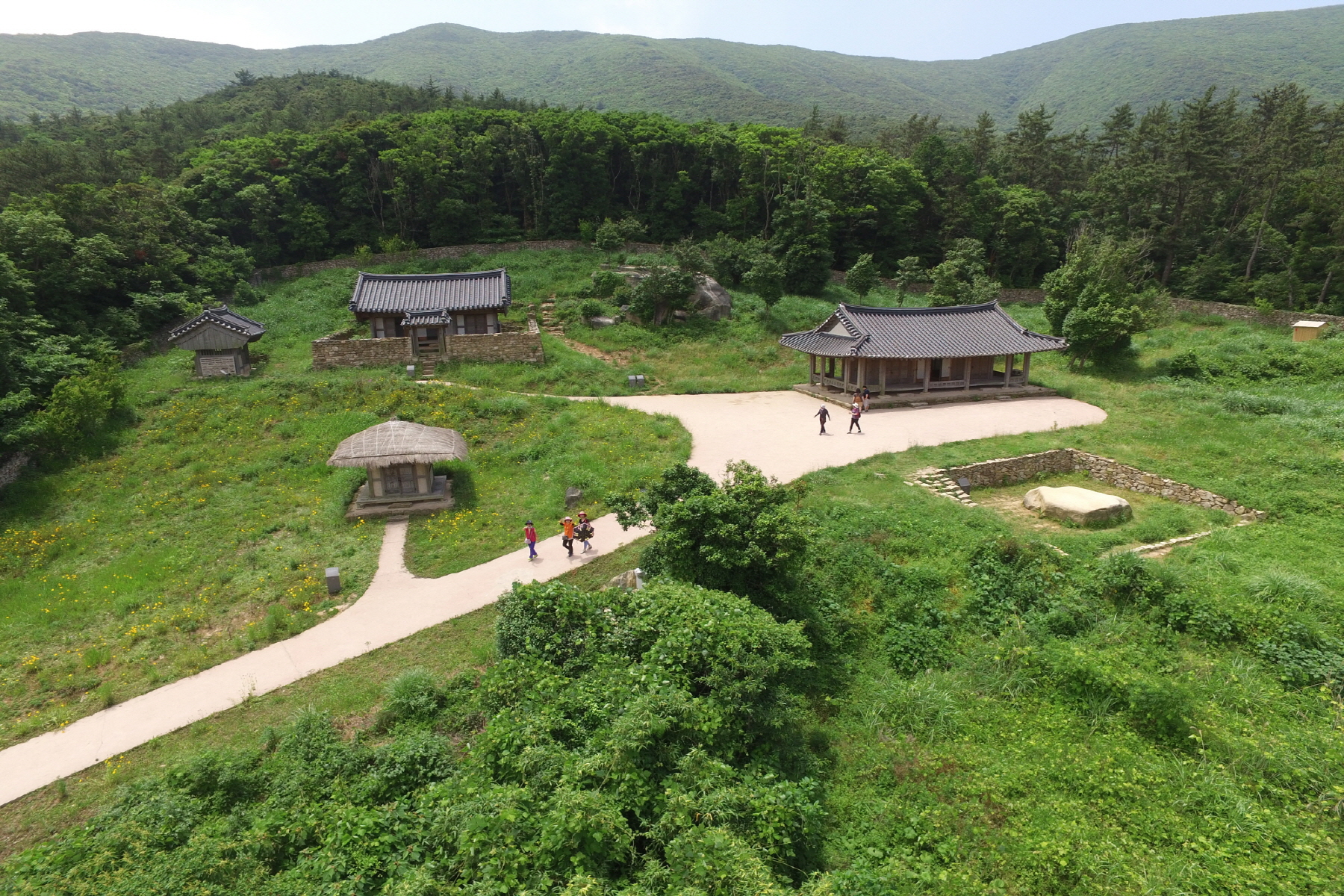
Bogildo nakseojae

For Nakseojae (낙서재; 樂書齋), Yun Seondo used the pen name of Gosan(고산). He built three rooftiled houses in the east, west, and center, where he studied the teachings of Neo-Confucianism.

Dongcheonseoksil (동천석실; 東天石室) is a small pavilion on the cliff rock halfway up the mountain across from Nakseojae. Nearby Seokmun (‘stone gate’), Seokcheon (‘stone spring’), Seokpok (‘stone waterfall’), and Seokdae (‘stone ledge’) constitute magnificent scenes. Sitting between Seyeon-ji (‘pond’) and Hoesu-dam (‘pond’), Seyeon-jeong (‘pavilion’) is a plaque reading Seyeonji in the center, one reading Hogwangru in the east, one reading Nakgiran in the south, and ones each reading Donghwagak and Chilamheon hanging from it.

== Garden ==
Yun Seondo Wonrim (‘Grove’) on Bogildo is broadly composed of three areas. (낙서재; 樂書齋), a private family house with a library, faces north, and a rill called Namgeumgye (낭음계; 朗吟溪) passes by. On each side the buildings of Goksudang ( 곡수당; 曲水堂) and Mumindang (무민당; 無憫堂) stand. Beside the two buildings lies a large, square pond.

The name of Dongcheonseoksil (동천석실; 東天石室) came from ‘Dongcheonbokji’ which refers to an unexampled place of scenic beauty where a Taoist hermit dwells, and is situated at the highest place in the area for resting and reading.

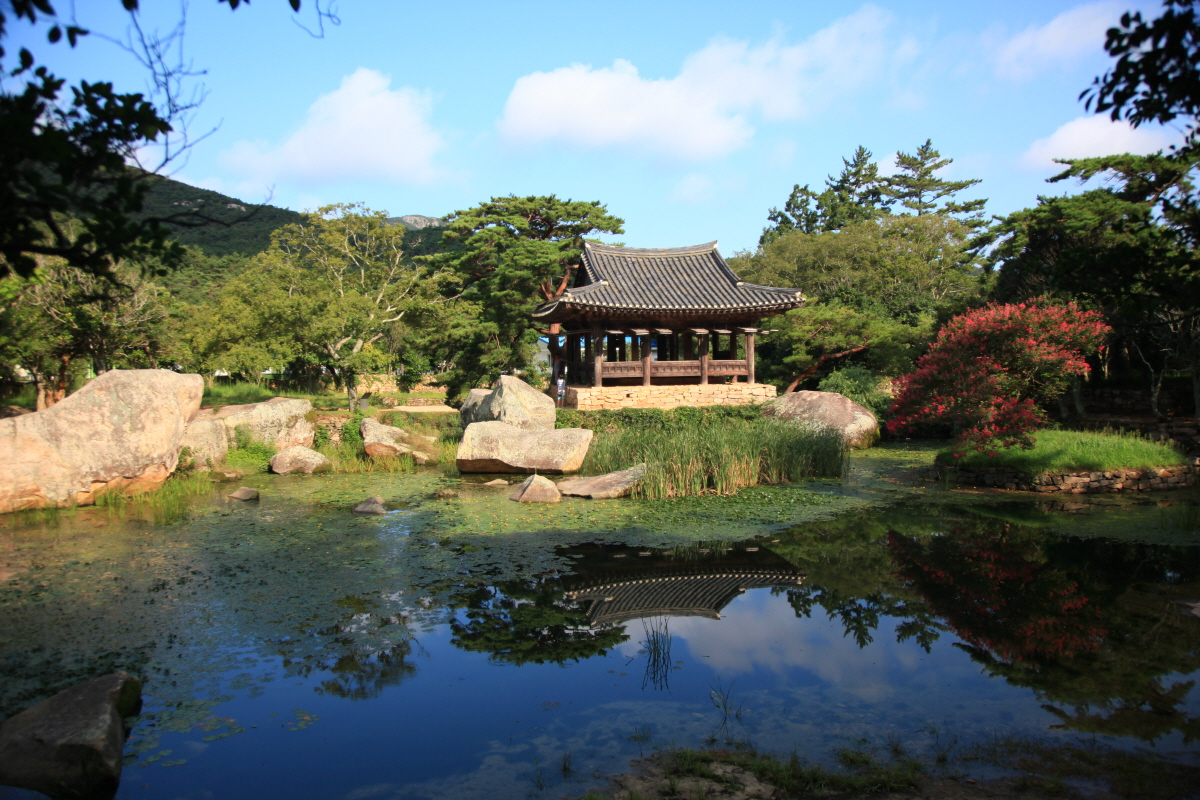
Seyeonjeong

The area that surrounds Seyeonjeong (세연정; 洗然亭) is the most exquisitely wrought part of the garden. When creating an artificial waterway in the village entrance lying adjacent to the beach, pond, a pavilion, and a ledge were built to ensure visitors’ appreciation of the scene.

== Literature ==
- Katharina I-Bon Suh: The Garden of Seyeonjeong as a Realm of Thoughts. A Meaningful and Purposeful Creation by Korean scholar Gosan Yun Seondo (1587−1671). In: Die Gartenkunst 29 (2017/1). ISSN 0935-0519, p 129−154.
