= Hong Uwŏn =

Joseon scholar and writer

- Korean name
- Hangul: 홍우원
- Hanja: 洪宇遠
- RR: Hong Uwon
- MR: Hong Uwŏn

Art name
- Hangul: 남파
- Hanja: 南坡
- RR: Nampa
- MR: Namp'a

Courtesy name
- Hangul: 군징
- Hanja: 君徵
- RR: Gunjing
- MR: Kunjing

Posthumous name
- Hangul: 문간
- Hanja: 文簡
- RR: Mungan
- MR: Mun'gan

Hong Uwŏn (Korean: 홍우원; Hanja: 洪宇遠; July 29, 1605 – July 27, 1687) was a Korean Neo-Confucian scholar, politician and writer, who lived during the Joseon period. He was from the Namyang Hong clan (To Hong lineage).

== Family ==
- Father – Hong Yŏng (홍영; 洪榮; July 26, 1567 – April 20, 1624)
  - Grandfather - Hong Kasin (홍가신; 洪可臣; July 17, 1541 — June 14, 1615)
  - Grandmother - Lady Yi of the Jaeryeong Yi clan (정경부인 재령 이씨; December 7, 1540 — March 28, 1615)
- Mother – Lady Hŏ of the Yangcheon Hŏ clan (양천 허씨; November 28, 1569 – February 1, 1652)
  - Grandfather - Hŏ Sŏng (허성; 許筬; June 13, 1548 — ?)
  - Grandmother - Lady Yi of the Jeonju Yi clan (전주 이씨; 1550–?) eldest daughter of Yi Hŏn'guk (이헌국; 李憲國; 1524–?)
- Siblings
  - Older sister - Lady Hong of the Namyang Hong clan (남양 홍씨; 1592–?)
  - Older brother - Hong Ujŏng (홍우정; 洪宇定; 1593–1654)
  - Older brother - Hong U'gwan (홍우관; 洪宇寬; 1596–?)
  - Older sister - Lady Hong of the Namyang Hong clan (남양 홍씨)
  - Older brother - Hong Ugwing (홍우굉; 洪宇宏; 1603–?)
  - Younger brother - Hong Uryang (홍우량; 洪宇亮; 1608–?)
- Wives and their issue
  - Lady Yi of the Yonan Yi clan (연안 이씨; 1605–?); youngest daughter of Yi Kwangjŏng (이광정; 李光庭; 1552–1629)
    - Daughter - Lady Hong of the Namyang Hong clan (남양 홍씨; 1630–?)
    - Son - Hong Myŏn (홍면; 洪冕; 1635–?)
  - Lady Kwŏn (권씨; 1615–?)
    - Daughter - Lady Hong of the Namyang Hong clan (남양 홍씨; 1639–?)
    - Son - Hong Ch'im (홍침; 洪䒞; 1640–?)

== Arts ==
=== Books ===
- Namp'a munjib (남파문집) [Vol. 13]
- Paekhŭknan (백흑난)
- Mokgŭn ch'imsŏl (목근침설) [essay]

=== Works ===
- Yi Sangŭi sindo pimyŏng (이상의신도비명; 李尙毅神道碑銘)
- Yun Sŏndo sindo pimyŏng (윤선도신도비명)
- Yun Sŏndo sijang (윤선도 시장; 諡狀)
- Chŏngmyo chunggan Namyang Hong-ssi sebo sŏ (정묘중간남양홍씨세보서; 丁卯重刊南陽洪氏世譜序)

== See also ==
- Song Si-yŏl
- Yun Sŏndo
