= Record of Lady Sa's Southward Journey =

Record of Lady Sa's Southward Journey, also called Lady Sa's Journey To The South, or Sa sshi namjŏn ki (Korean: 사씨남정기; Hanja: 謝氏南征記), is a 17th-century Korean novel by Kim Man-jung set in the Ming dynasty of China.

It was written during the Joseon dynasty, under the reign of King Sukjong. Unlike most works of unknown authorship, the novel has been attributed to a single author.

== Main characters ==
- Lady Sa

The main protagonist in the novel. She is the loyal and virtuous wife of Master Yu. Married to Master Yu for nine years, but unable to bear any children.

- Master Yu

A scholar and Lady Sa’s husband who then becomes Lady Kyo’s husband.

- Lady Kyo

The second wife of Master Yu. She is envious of Lady Sa’s position as the first wife and went to great lengths in order to secure that same position. She gave birth to Master Yu’s only child, a son. However, she then kills her son in order to frame Lady Sa.

== Influence on arts and pop culture ==
- Historical dramas set during King Sukjong's reign, when focusing on his relationships between Queen Inhyeon & Jang Ok-jeong, Royal Concubine Hee, tend to depict Record of Lady Sa's Southward Journey in one way or another as a veiled satire of the ménage à trois, and more often than not preclude towards Gapsul Hwanguk. Some of these dramas include:
  - Royal Story: Jang Hui-bin (2002-2003, KBS2)
  - Dong Yi (2010, MBC TV)
  - Jang Ok-jung, Living by Love (2013, SBS TV)
- It is referenced in the 2020 tvN TV series Record of Youth, when Ahn Jeong-ha (Park So-dam) tells Sa Hye-jun (Park Bo-gum) that the only "Sa" she has ever heard about is Lady Sa from the Record of Lady Sa’s Southward Journey.

== See also ==
- Kim Man-jung
- Queen Inhyeon
- Hui-bin Jang
