= Eulhae Purge =

1755 political purge in Joseon

- Hangul: 을해옥사
- Hanja: 乙亥獄事
- Revised Romanization: Eulhae Oksa
- McCune–Reischauer: Ŭrhae Oksa

The Eulhae Purge (Korean: 을해옥사) occurred in 1755 during the reign of Yeongjo of Joseon. Yeongjo, who supported Noron, had a grudge against Soron (Korean political faction). Before Yeongjo became king, Noron advocated for his regency during the illness of his reigning older brother, Gyeongjong of Joseon, which Soron opposed. Yeongjo forced Soron out of power and put Noron in power. Five members of Soron were accused of treason and executed.
