= Goksan No clan =

Korean clan from Hwanghae Province

- Country: Korea
- Current region: Koksan County
- Founder: No Won

Goksan No clan (Korean: 곡산 노씨; Hanja: 谷山 盧氏) was one of the Korean clans. Their Bon-gwan was in Koksan County, Hwanghae Province. According to the research in 1985, the number of Goksan No clan was 7453. Their founder was No Won. He was the 9th son of No Hae who was dispatched to Silla when he was a Hanlin Academy in Tang dynasty. No Jo (Hanja: 盧兆), a No Won's descendant, began Goksan No clan and made Koksan their Bon-gwan.

== See also ==
- Korean clan names of foreign origin
