= Hŏ Mok =

Korean scholar-politician (1596–1682)

Hŏ Mok 허목
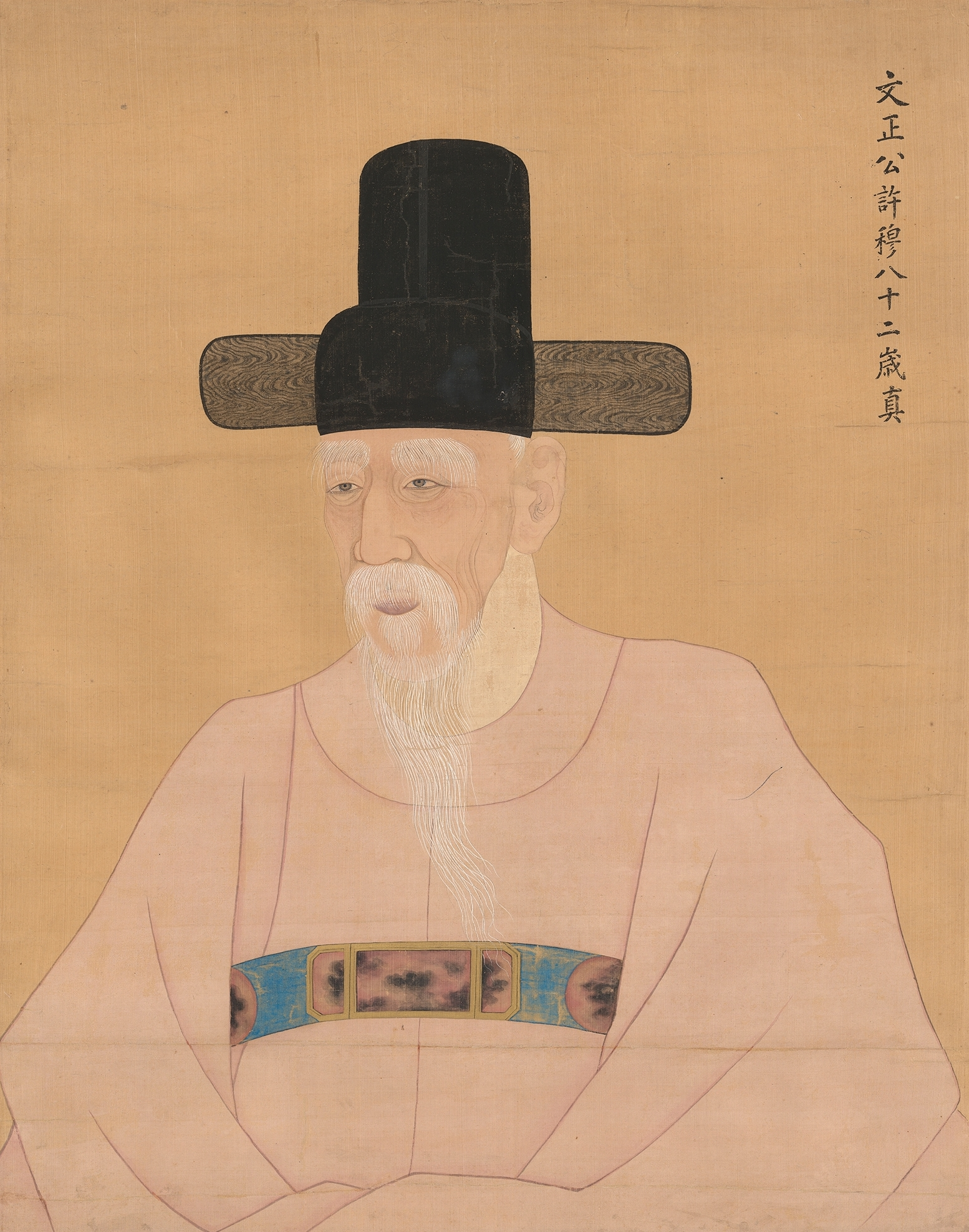
- Portrait by Yi Myeong-gi, 1794

Right State Councillor
- In office August 14, 1675 – April 24, 1678
- Preceded by: Kwŏn Taeun
- Succeeded by: Min Hŭi

Personal details
- Born: January 10, 1596 Cheonseonbang, Hanseong, Joseon
- Died: June 2, 1682 (aged 86) Wangjing Township, Yeoncheon County, Gyeonggi Province, Joseon
- Spouse: Lady Yi of the Jeonju Yi clan
- Children: Heo Ham; Heo Hwon; Heo Do
- Parents: Hŏ Kyu (father); Lady Im of the Naju Im clan (mother)
- Occupation: Calligrapher; painter; philosopher; poet; politician

- Korean name
- Hangul: 허목
- Hanja: 許穆
- RR: Heo Mok
- MR: Hŏ Mok

Art name
- Hangul: 미수
- Hanja: 眉叟
- RR: Misu
- MR: Misu

Courtesy name
- Hangul: 문부, 화보
- Hanja: 文甫, 和甫
- RR: Munbu, Hwabo
- MR: Munbu, Hwabo

Posthumous name
- Hangul: 문정
- Hanja: 文正
- RR: Munjeong
- MR: Munjŏng

Hŏ Mok (Korean: 허목; Hanja: 許穆; January 10, 1596 – June 2, 1682) was a Korean calligrapher, painter, philosopher, poet, and politician during the Joseon period, who came from the Yangcheon Hŏ clan. He was most commonly known by the art name Misu (Korean: 미수; Hanja: 眉叟; lit. '"eyebrowed old man"').

Heo was known as the best Korean calligrapher of his time due to his unique style of calligraphy. He became a governor at the age of 81, and was the first person in Korean history to hold such a high-ranking position without taking the civil service exam.

== Biography ==
=== Early life ===
Hŏ Mok was born at Changseonbang (창선방,彰善坊), in Hanseong. His father, Hŏ Kyo, was a member of the lower bureaucracy, while his great-grandfather, Hŏ Cha, once served as the Vice Prime Minister of Joseon.

Hŏ Mok's maternal grandfather, Im Che, was a student of Sŏ Kyŏngdŏk. His father, Hŏ Kyo, was a student of Pak Chihwa. Sŏ Kyŏngdŏk and Pak Chihwa's more academic and ideologically-successful pupils were to join the political faction called Easterners (or Tongin; 동인, 東人) at the Joseon Court. However, a schism divided court politics into two newly-formed factions: Southerners (or Namin; 남인, 南人) and Northerners (or Pukin; 북인, 北人), with the Easterners being assimilated into the Northerners. Hŏ's family were thus members of the Northerners faction.

Hŏ Mok's early years were spent as a disciple to Yi Sanhae and at Yi Wŏnik's distinct private scholarly institutions.

In 1613, he married Lady Yi of the Jeonju Yi clan, a granddaughter of Yi Wŏnik (art name Ori). The marriage was initially met with opposition from his wife's family, but Yi Wŏnik's support made it successful.

=== Early career ===
In 1615, Hŏ Mok and his cousin, Hŏ Hu, went to study at Chŏng Ku's private educational institute, where they remained until 1620.

In 1626, Hŏ Mok, as the head of management of the dormitory of educational institutions, imposed personal sanctions on scholar Pak Chigye, accusing him of joining King Injo's attempt to destroy the Li. As a result, he was banned from applying for Gwageo for a period of time.

=== Political movements ===
In 1651, he was commended for his philosophical learning skills, and appointed to the position of Naesi kyogwan (내시교관; 內侍敎官), but a few years later, he resigned.

In 1656, after serving as Jojiseobyuljwa, and as Kongjo chwarang (공조좌랑; 工曺佐郞), he was appointed Yonggung hyŏn'gam (용궁현감; 龍宮縣監), but resigned shortly after.

In 1657, he was reappointed to Kongjo chwarang, then appointed to Sahŏnbu changryŏng (사헌부장령; 司憲府掌令), and then to Saboksi Chubu (사복시주부; 司僕侍主簿).

In 1658, he was reappointed to Sahŏnbu changryŏng.

In 1659, King Hyojong appointed Hŏ Mok to Puhogun (부호군; 副護軍), and later that September, he became head of Changakwŏn (장악원정; 掌樂院正). In December, he was appointed as leader of Sanguiwŏn (상의원정; 尙衣院正).

During King Hyojong's funeral, he was in conflict with Song Si-yŏl and Song Chun-gil regarding the appropriate length of time for which Queen Jangryeol (자의대비; at the time called "Grand Royal Queen Dowager Jaui"), the second wife of King Injo, should mourn her step-son, based on Confucian rules.

=== Yesong arguments ===
==== First Yesong argument ====
In May of 1659(by the lunar calendar used at the time), an ideological dispute over how long the Queen Jangnyeol(also known as Grand Royal Queen Dowager Jaui) should wear her mourning clothes for the death of her stepson Hyojong of Joseon known as the "Kihae Yesong(己亥禮訟,Yesong(The argument on morals) on the year of Kihae) also known as the First of Yesong Ronjaeng (제1차 예송 논쟁, 第一次禮訟論爭,First Dispute over rituals). The dispute was sparked by a contradiction of ritual principles that can be applied because of the dubious nature of the position of Hyojong of Joseon,because despite him being born as the second son of Injo of Joseon, he can be considered the eldest son because of the rule that says "anyone who is the legitimate heir to the throne is treated as the eldest son".Regarding this matter two opposing political factions, the Southerners faction and the Westerners faction disagreed.

Song Si-yŏl and Song Chun-gil, two leaders of the Westerners faction (or Sŏin; 서인, 西人), argued that the Queen should mourn for Hyojong for just a year, since he was only Injo's second son (despite being the legitimate heir to the throne), and thus was not fit to be mourned for three years, which was the normal period of mourning for eldest sons. On the other hand, Hŏ Mok and Yun Hyu(who was part of the Southerners faction) argued that Hyojong, as King Injo's successor, should be practically treated as if he was Injo's eldest son, and based on this interpretation, Queen Jaui should mourn for three years for her husband's son. While Song Si-yŏl asserted the status of Joseon Dynasty as "small China" to justify his arguments based on Chinese Neo-Confucian rule books, Hŏ Mok asserted the status of the Kingdom of Joseon as a "different country that is beyond the rule of China" (방외별국; 方外別國), thus different rules should be applied. As a result of the dispute, Yŏngŭijŏng Chŏng T'aehwa decided to set the mourning period for Grand Royal Queen Dowager Jaui to one year, based on the rules of Kyŏngguk taejŏn and was the state official solution(which did not differentiate the biological elders and biological second sons), but was considered a political win for Westerners faction.

==== Second Yesong argument ====
During that period, he wrote Kiŏn (기언; 記言) and Tongsa (or "Eastern History"; 동사, 東史). The "Eastern History" was a Korean history book that considered the national ancestor as Dangun, which was against the general idea of the national ancestor being Kija.

In 1674, King Hyojong's wife, Queen Inseon, died. This revived the dispute over the length of the period Queen Jangnyeol,who was the mother in law of Queen Inseon, should wear mourning clothes for the death of Queen Inseon, and the dispute was known as the "Kapinyesong(甲寅禮訟, dispute of morals on the year of Kapin)" or the "second Yesong argument". Song Si-yeol argued that Queen Inseon, as the wife of Injo's second son, should be mourned for 9 months. But Hŏ Mok and Yun Hyu maintained that Hyojong was the successor of King Injo, which practically made Queen Inseon the first daughter-in-law and required one year of mourning.

King Hyeonjong was unpleasant by "King Hyojong's Second" title and wanted a cabinet reshuffle, in order to give the power to the Southerners (at that time, the westerners was the ruling party, headed by Song Si-yŏl). This meant a victory for Hŏ Mok and Yun Hyu, but Hyeonjong died soon after.

=== Acquisition of power ===
Despite Hyeonjong's death, Hŏ Mok was still trusted. In November 1674, he was appointed to Ijo ch'amŭi (이조참의; 吏曺參議) and continuously served as Sahŏnbu Taesahŏn (사헌부대사헌; 司憲府大司憲). In 1675 he was successively appointed for posts such as Ijo ch'ampan (이조참판; 吏曺參判), Bibyŏngukdangsang (비변국당상; 備邊局堂上), Chwach'amch'an (좌참찬; 左參讚), Ijo p'ansŏ (이조판서; 吏曺判書) and U ch'amch'an (우참찬; 右參讚). In 1676, Hŏ Mok was promoted to Right State Councillor of Joseon.

In 1679, Hŏ Kyŏn, a party member and Chief State Councillor Hŏ Chuk's illegitimate son, abused his power and Hŏ Mok attacked Hŏ Chuk for it, but King Sukjong and the Southerners took Hŏ Kyŏn's side.

=== Death ===
On June 2, 1682, he died in Gyeonggi Province, at the age of 86.

The Westerners continued to attack Hŏ Mok and Yun Hyu, calling them Samunanjŏk (사문난적; 斯文亂賊).

In 1689, he was rehabilitated. In 1692, he was posthumously conferred the honours of a Chief State Councillor. Hŏ Mok was also awarded the posthumous title Munjŏng (Korean: 문정; Hanja: 文正).

== Books ==
- Kyŏngnye Yuch'an (경례유찬; 經禮類纂; 1647)
- Tongsa [Eastern History] (동사; 東史; 1667)
- Ch'ŏngsa Yŏljŏn [Blue Gentlemen List] (청사열전 淸士列傳; 1667)
- Kyŏngsŏl (경설 經說; 1677)
- Misu Ch'ŏnjamun (미수 천자문 眉叟天字文)
- Tangun Sega [Tangun's Family] (단군세가 檀君世家)
- Misu Kiŏn (미수기언; 眉叟記言)
- Sim Hakdo (심학도; 心學圖)
- Pangguk Wangjorye (방국왕조례; 邦國王朝禮)
- Chŏngch'e chŏnjungsŏl (정체전중설; 正體傳重說)
- Yosun Ujŏn Susimbŏpdo (요순우전수심법도; 堯舜禹傳授心法圖)
- Hŏ Mok Sugobon (허목수고본; 許穆手稿本)
- Dut'a Sangi (두타산기; 頭陀山記)

== Gallery ==
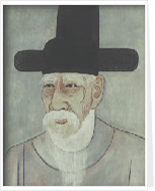
Portrait of Hŏ Mok (1680)

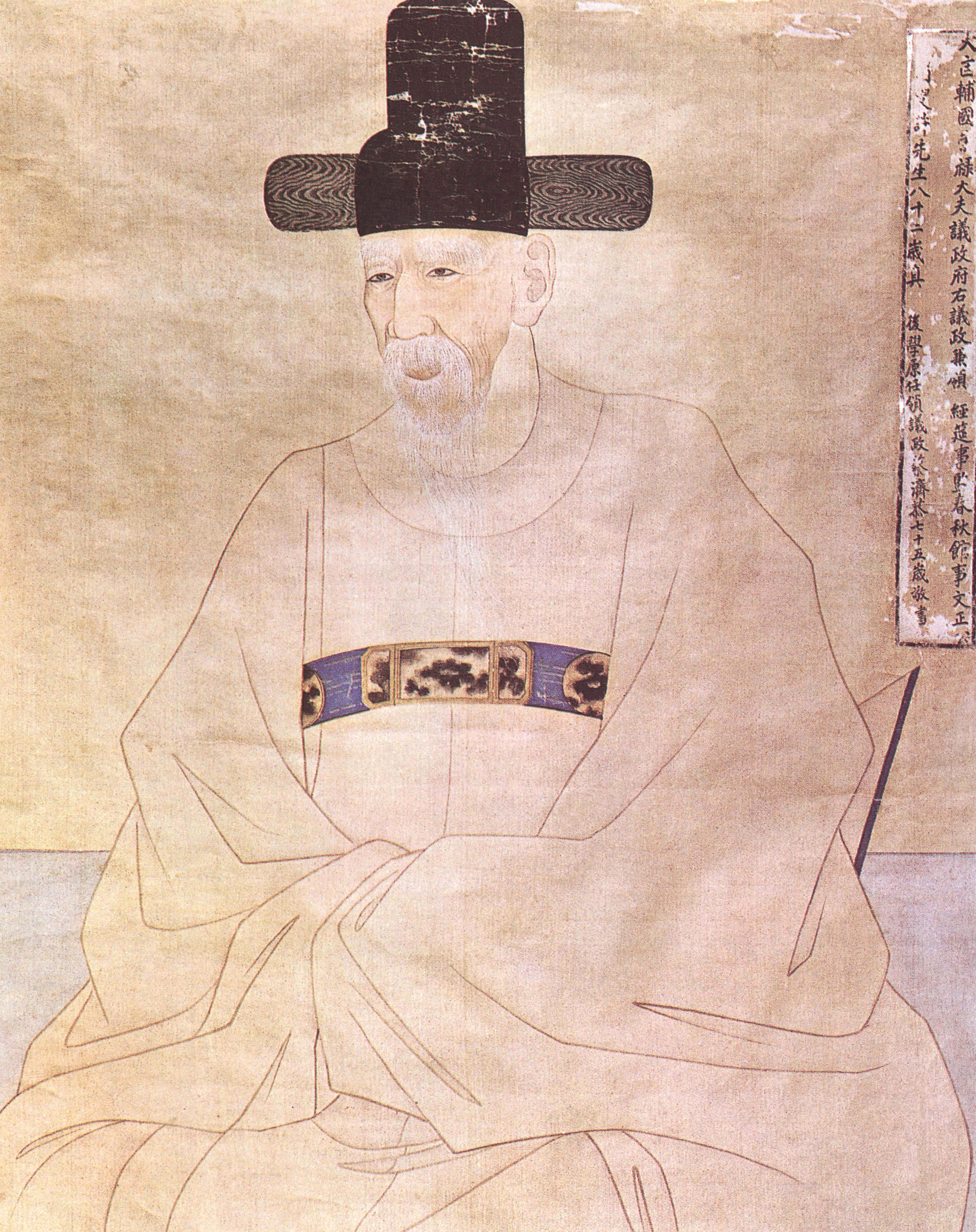
Portrait of Hŏ Mok (1677)

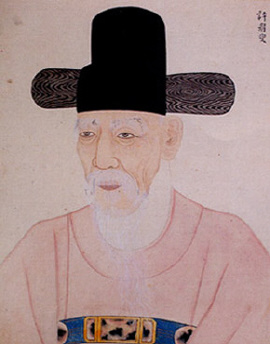
Portrait of Hŏ Mok (1790)

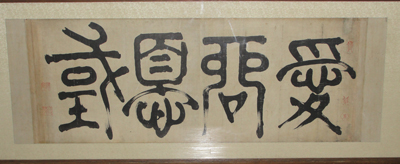
Hŏ Mok said "love of the people and patriotisms"

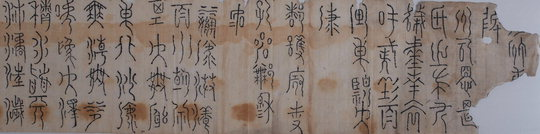
Draft of the Cheukju East Sea's epitaphs (1661)

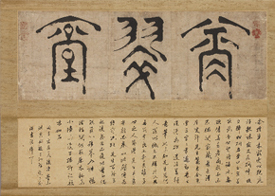
Signboard of Hamchuidang

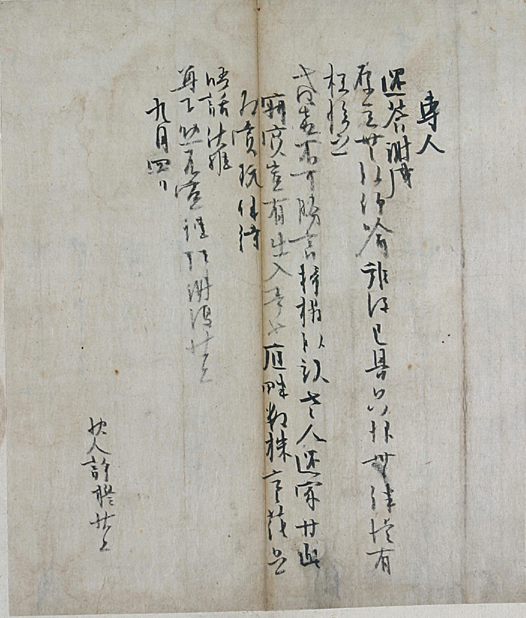
Letter of Hŏ Mok

== Family ==
- Father: Hŏ Kyo (허교, 許喬; 1567–1632)
- Mother: Lady Im of the Naju Im clan (나주 임씨; 1570–1647)
- Siblings
  - Younger brother: Hŏ Ŭi (허의; 許懿; 1601–?)
  - Younger brother: Hŏ Sŏ (허서; 許舒; 1603–?)
  - Younger sister: Lady Hŏ of the Yangcheon Hŏ clan (허씨; 1605–?)
- Wife and issue
  - Lady Yi of the Jeonju Yi clan (전주 이씨; 1595–1653)
    - Son: Hŏ Hwŏn (허훤, 許翧; 1620–?)
    - Son: Hŏ Ham (허함; 1623–?)
    - Son: Hŏ To (허도; 1530–1676)
    - Daughter: Lady Hŏ of the Yangcheon Hŏ clan (허씨)
    - Daughter: Lady Hŏ of the Yangcheon Hŏ clan (허씨)

== See also ==
- List of Korean philosophers
- Korean philosophy
- Song Si-yŏl
- Yun Hyu
- Yun Sŏndo
- Bojihwayangdong buralsongseonsaeng
