= Kim Yong Sop =

Korean historian

- Hangul: 김용섭
- RR: Gim Yongseop
- MR: Kim Yongsŏp

Kim Yong Sop (Korean: 김용섭; 8 October 1931 - 20 October 2020) was a South Korean scholar, historian, and honorary professor at Yonsei University.

Kim is known for influencing change in Korea. Korea was seen as a country whose development was due to colonization. Kim showed how capitalism was already changing Korea. Through nine books and over fifty years, his research on agricultural history from the late Joseon period to modern Korea explores how Joseon could develop and sustain a capitalist society.

He was awarded the first Korean Studies Literature award with his nine books.

Kim's work used extensive data and a variety of evidence to document Joseon's transformation move into a capitalist society, showing that Japanese colonization was not needed to accelerate the process. Because Joseon was a Japanese colony, the history of Joseon was written by the Japanese. Through “intrinsic development theory” (“내재적 발전론”[nae-jae-jeok bal-jeon-ron]), he argued that Japanese colonialism was not responsible for the development Joseon, as the Japanese had claimed in their colonial histories.

== Life ==
Kim was born in Tongcheon, Gangwon-do in 1931 when Korea was a colony of Japan. Before the Korean War, he moved to the southern part of Korea.

He graduated from the Department of History at Seoul National University and devoted his entire life to researching the agricultural history of the late Joseon. He was obsessed with the intrinsic development process of Korean history. Through systematic historical research on agriculture in Korea, the intrinsic development of Korea was recognized and influenced academia and Korean society.

From 1959 to 1975, he served as a professor at Seoul National University and moved to Yonsei University in 1975. He retired from Yonsei University in 1997. After reaching retirement age in 1997, he became a member of the Korean Academy of Sciences. Following his retirement in 2000, Kim Yong Sop also became an honorary professor at Yonsei University. He received the National Medal of Merit Dongbaek (1997) and the Chiam Academic Award (1984).

In the 1960s, popular articles were published in newspapers and magazines about him, but as time passed, Kim Yong Sop's health was deteriorating, so he had to choose either work or publicity. Kim Yong Sop chose to continue his research rather than show himself in front of the public.

Kim Yong Sop's health declined and he died on 20 October 2020.

== Works ==
Kim Yong Sop commenced his study of Korean agricultural history after completing an undergraduate degree in history at Seoul National University and graduate school at Korea University. He said, "It was judged that the class confrontation between the farmers and yangbans (양반) before the Japanese colonial rule was expanded after liberation." As a displaced person, he paid great attention to overcoming the division of the country and tried to explain the internal causes of the Korean War. As it was necessary to understand the socioeconomic background of the war of ethnic conflict, his research on agricultural history focused on the social conflict between landlords and farmers in the agriculturally oriented society of Joseon.

Kim Yong Sop's view of the Korean War is also distinct from the theory of civil war in the Korean War claimed by progressive American scholars. This theory holds that the U.S. amplified the social conflict in the Korean Peninsula rather than resolving it, which eventually led to war. In contrast, Kim Yong Sop believes that the conflict between landlords and farmers in Korean rural areas, which had accumulated since the late Joseon, led to a confrontation between capitalist and socialist under Japanese colonial rule, and the conflict exploded.

His research on Korean agricultural history focuses on socioeconomic history to explain agricultural technology, land systems, farmers, landlord management, social change, and contradictory structure and economic history research to agonize and sought solutions to agricultural problems at the time.

Extrapolating from his research, he contended that if society in the late Joseon had not been influenced by foreign powers, it could have developed into a capitalist society on its own. Kim Hyung Seob refers to this as “intrinsic development”. Careful analysis of the land ledger, Yangan (양안), and the family register determined that the “well-to-do tenant farmers” (경영형 부농) were growing in the late Joseon. Wealthy farmers who held managerial positions were a new force that played a major role in transforming the economy. His research shook off the colonial theory that the Korean people had no power to independently make history and needed to be ruled by foreign powers. Furthermore, it was evaluated that his research contributed to making Koreans confident by providing a positive spirit.

Kim Yong Sop's research on modern and contemporary agriculture can be referred to as "two paths to modernization": landlord modernization and peasant modernization. Kim Yong Sop saw that the choice of modernization path is determined by how agricultural and rural problems are solved. In South Korea, it was found that the landlord modernization path, in which landlords became industrial capitalists, and the peasant modernization path, in which farmers grew into citizens, were repeatedly compromised and confronted. The foreign scholar who identified the various stages in the process of forming a modern state (in the context of rural changes) is Barrington Moore, author of the Social Origins of Dictatorship and Democracy. There are many differences between Barrington Moore and Kim Yong Sop's research, but comparing the two will greatly help to understand contemporary Korean history in a comparative historical context.

Kim Yong Sop's research on agricultural history is a huge academic achievement accomplished by the liberation generation. This generation experienced the tragedies of colonialism, division, and war. His work represents the history of knowledge that the liberated generation struggled with during their era. In addition, his work could help today's generation, as it continues to work through the problem of division and the task of overcoming spiritual colonialism.

=== Authored Books ===
- While Walking Along the Path of History: A Historical Study Lecture by a Liberating Generation Scholar (역사의 오솔길을 가면서(해방세대 학자의 역사연구 역사강의), 2011)
- A Study on Yangan (양안 연구, 1960)
- A Study on Agriculture in the Late Joseon Dynasty I (조선후기농업사연구 I, 1970)
- A Study on Agriculture in the Late Joseon Dynasty II (조선후기농업사연구 II, 1971)
- Agricultural History Research in the Late Joseon Dynasty (조선후기농학사연구, 1988)
- Korean Modern Agricultural Research (한국근대농업사연구, 1975)
- Research on Modern and Contemporary Agriculture in Korea (한국근현대농업사연구, 1992)
- A Study on Middle Ages Agriculture in Korea (한국중세농업사연구, 2000)
- Korean Ancient Agricultural Research (한국고대농업사연구, 2019)

== Criticism ==
In The Twilight of Modern History, Yun Hae Dong said:

- His intrinsic development theory consists of history that is too broad, from the 17th century to the 20th century. It forces the capitalization of Joseon by using evidence from a long period which does not fully prove that Joseon was being modernized. In addition, this makes it look like the past is more important than the future. It allows people to focus more on the past when the present is not stable.

Criticism from Kim Ho Gi:

- From a sociological point of view, the theory of intrinsic development still explains well. Above all, the theory of intrinsic development provides a consistent explanation of internal change. It shows how the internal response to external conflicts is important to social change. In other words, the exploration of how internal and external factors have been combined to become something else in history is a task that Kim Yong Sop has left to future generations.

Some see the theory of intrinsic development as a product of nationalism's desire to exaggerate the history of the great development of the people to compensate for the inferiority complex that comes from being trampled on by foreign powers. However, Kim Yong Sop's aim is to look at the dark wounds of the nation from the front and try to find the cause from the inner background without blaming others.

== Achievements ==
Kim Yong Sop received many awards, including:

- The 11th Korean Publishing Culture Award (제11회 한국출판문화상 저작상, 1971)
- The 1st Chi-Am Academic Award (제1회 치암학술상, 1984)
- Korean Academic Writing Award (제1회 한국학저술상, 2020)

When he was awarded the first Korean Studies Literature award with his nine books, he stated:

- I recently published an ancient Korean agricultural study. Since publishing a study on agricultural history in the late Joseon Dynasty, all Korean agriculture over the entire period has been organized into nine volumes. It took 50 years since the first work was published. As we began research on Korean agriculture, we tried to overcome the colonial history of Japanese imperialism, which was a task of the Korean academic world after liberation, and to reveal the independent historical development of our history. And from the beginning, I planned to organize the ancient agricultural history of Korea. Now I'm done with my research on my hospital bed. I'm so happy to share my personal joy with you through today's writing award. Thank you to everyone who helped me complete this work. In the midst of that, we can't help but mention the help of Lee Gyeomro who gave us the award today. There are no Korean studies researchers who have not walked to Tongmungwan and have not received help. So did I. In particular, during the period of Dongsung-dong at Seoul National University's Literary University in the late 1960s, I was able to start research on the holding system during the Japanese colonial period. Taking this harvest season as an example, we were able to proceed with several cases of holding management. Of course, this thesis is published in my work, Korean Modern and Contemporary Agricultural Research. Once again, I would like to thank Lee Seung-ro, the teacher of Tongmungwan. Now that we have completed the agricultural history study, I would like to express my sincere gratitude to President Kim Kyung-hee, who recommended the publication of the work and was in charge of non-commercial publishing. We received the Writing Award together.
