= Kim Jip =

Korean scholar-official (1574–1656)

- Hangul: 김집
- Hanja: 金集
- RR: Gim Jip
- MR: Kim Chip

Art name
- Hangul: 신독, 신독재
- Hanja: 愼獨, 愼獨齋
- RR: Sindok, Sindokjae
- MR: Sindok, Sindokchae

Courtesy name
- Hangul: 사강
- Hanja: 士剛
- RR: Sagang
- MR: Sagang

Kim Jip (Korean: 김집; Hanja: 金集; 1574–1656) was a Korean Neo-Confucian scholar, politician, educator and writer of the Joseon period. He was also the teacher of Song Si-yeol and Song Jun-gil, great Korean Neo-Confucian scholars.

== Family ==
- Father
  - Kim Jang-saeng (김장생; 金長生; 8 July 1548 – 3 August 1631)
- Mother
  - Jo Eo-hwa (조어화; 曺於火), Lady Jo of the Changnyeong Jo clan (창녕 조씨; 1551–1586); Kim Jang-saeng's first wife
- Siblings
  - Older brother - Kim Eun (김은; 金檃; 1567–1592?); went missing during the Imjin War
  - Older sister - Lady Kim of the Gwangsan Kim clan (광산 김씨; 1570–?)
  - Younger brother - Kim Ban (김반; 金槃; 1580–1640)
  - Younger sister - Lady Kim of the Gwangsan Kim clan (광산 김씨; 1581–1661)
  - Younger half-brother - Kim Yeong (김영; 金榮; 1590–1644)
  - Younger half-brother - Kim Gyeong (김경; 1594–?)
  - Younger half-sister - Lady Kim of the Gwangsan Kim clan (광산 김씨; 1597–?)
  - Younger half-brother - Kim Go (김고; 1600–?)
  - Younger half-brother - Kim Gu (김구; 金榘; 1604–1684)
  - Younger half-brother - Kim Gyu (김규; 金槼; 23 June 1606 – 24 July 1697)
  - Younger half-sister - Lady Kim of the Gwangsan Kim clan (광산 김씨; 1610–?)
  - Younger half-brother - Kim Bi (김비; 金棐; 1623–1699)
- Wives and their children
  - Lady Yu of the Gigye Yu clan (기계 유씨; 1570–1622); daughter of Yu Hong (유홍; 兪泓) — No issue.
  - Lady Yi of the Deoksu Yi clan (덕수 이씨; 1570–1658); daughter of Yi Yi
    - Son - Kim Ik-hyeong (김익형; 金益炯; 1600–1662)
    - Daughter - Lady Kim of the Gwangsan Kim clan (광산 김씨; 1603–?)
    - Son - Kim Ik-ryeon (김익련; 金益煉; 1606–1689)
    - Daughter - Lady Kim of the Gwangsan Kim clan (광산 김씨; 1620–?)

== Works ==
- Sindokjaejip (신독재집), also called Sindokchae sut’aekpon chŏn’gijip; a collection of pre-existing stories.
- Uiryemunhaesok (의례문해속; 疑禮問解續)

== See also ==
- Sŏng Hon
- Kim Jang-saeng
- Queen Ingyeong
- Kim Manjung
- Yi I
- Kim Ik-hun
- Song Chun-gil
- Song Si-yŏl
- Yun Sŏn'gŏ
- Yun Hyu
- Yun Jeung
