= Chŏng Ku =

Korean scholar (1543–1620)

- Korean name
- Hangul: 정구
- Hanja: 鄭逑
- RR: Jeong Gu
- MR: Chŏng Ku

Art name
- Hangul: 한강, 회연야인
- Hanja: 寒岡, 檜淵野人
- RR: Hangang, Hoeyeonyain
- MR: Han'gang, Hoeyŏnyain

Courtesy name
- Hangul: 도가, 가보
- Hanja: 道可, 可父
- RR: Doga, Gabo
- MR: Toga, Kabo

Posthumous name
- Hangul: 문목
- Hanja: 文穆
- RR: Munmok
- MR: Munmok

Chŏng Ku (Korean: 정구; Hanja: 鄭逑; 9 July 1543 – 5 January 1620) was a Korean historian, philosopher, poet, and politician of the Joseon period. He learned from the Korean scholars Yi Hwang from 1563 to 1573 and Cho Sik from 1566 to 1573. A key figure of the Neo-Confucian literati, he established the Yeongnam School and set up the Paengmaewŏn (백매원, 百梅園), a private Confucian academy. His pen names were Hangang (한강; 寒岡) and Hoeyŏnyain (회연야인; 檜淵野人), and courtesy name was Toga (도가; 道可) and Kabo (가보; 可父).

He was the ideological successor of Yi Hwang and Cho Sik, moral support of Namin faction and Bokin faction. His masters were Hŏ Mok, Yun Hyu, and Yun Sŏndo. There was a conflict called the Yesong Controversy (예송논쟁) then polemic of the Namin faction. He came from the Jinju Jeong clan (진주 정씨; 晉州 鄭氏).

== Family ==
- Father
  - Chŏng Sajung (정사중; 鄭思中)
- Mother
  - Lady Yi of the Seongju Yi clan (성주 이씨; 星州 李氏)
- Sibling(s)
  - Older brother – Chŏng Konsu (정곤수; 鄭崑壽)
- Spouse
  - Lady Yi of the Seongju Yi clan (성주 이씨; 星州 李氏)
- Issue
  - Son – Chŏng Chang(정장; 鄭樟)

== Works ==
- Hangang munjip (한강문집 寒岡文集)
- Taegŭk munbyŏn (태극문변 太極問辨)
- Karyejipramboju (가례집람보주 家禮輯覽補註)
- O sŏnsaeng yesŏl pullyu (오선생예설분류 五先生禮說分類)
- Kaengjang nok (갱장록 羹墻錄)
- Simgyŏng parhwi (심경발휘 心經發揮)
- Sim ŭi chejobŏp (심의제조법 深衣製造法)
- Yegi sangrye pullyu (예기상례분류 禮記喪禮分類)
- Ohbokyunhyukdo (오복연혁도 五福沿革圖)
- T'oegye sangjerye mundap (퇴계상제례문답 退溪喪祭禮問答)
- Kaejŏng Chuja sŏ chŏryo ch'ongmok (개정주자서절요총목 改定朱子書節要總目)
- Sŏnghyŏnp'ung (성현풍 聖賢風)
- Sŏnghyŏnp'ungbŏm (성현풍범 聖賢風範)
- Susa ŏninrok (수사언인록 洙泗言仁錄)
- Yŏmjangaengjangrok (염락갱장록 濂洛羹墻錄)
- Kwanŭi (관의 冠儀)
- Honŭi (혼의 婚儀)
- Changŭi (장의 葬儀)
- Kyeŭi (계의 稧儀)
- Yŏkdaeginyŏn (역대기년 歷代紀年)
- Kogŭmch'ungmo (고금충모 古今忠謨)
- Ch'iranjeyo (치란제요 治亂提要)
- Waryongji (와룡지 臥龍誌)
- Ŭianjipbang (의안집방 醫眼集方)
- Kwangsasokjip (광사속집 廣嗣續集)
- Ch'angshanji (창산지 昌山誌)
- Tongbokji (동복지 同福志)
- Kwandong chi (관동지 關東志)
- Yŏnggaji (영가지 永嘉志)
- P'yŏngyangji (평양지 平壤志)
- Hamjuji (함주지 咸州志)
- Chuja si pullyu (주자시분류 朱子詩分類)
- Kogŭmhoesu (고금회수 古今會粹)

== See also ==
- Yi Hwang
- Cho Sik
- Hŏ Mok
- Yun Sŏndo
- Yun Hyu
- Yi Sŏu
- Yu Hyung-won
