= Sŏng Hon =

Korean philosopher, poet and politician

- Hangul: 성혼
- Hanja: 成渾
- RR: Seong Hon
- MR: Sŏng Hon

Art name
- Hangul: 우계, 묵암
- Hanja: 牛溪, 默庵
- RR: Ugye, Mukam
- MR: Ugye, Mugam

Courtesy name
- Hangul: 호원
- Hanja: 浩原
- RR: Howon
- MR: Howŏn

Posthumous name
- Hangul: 문간
- Hanja: 文簡
- RR: Mungan
- MR: Mun'gan

Sŏng Hon (Korean: 성혼; Hanja: 成渾; 25 June 1535 – 6 June 1598) was a Korean philosopher, poet, and politician during the Joseon period. He was a Neo-Confucianist scholar who was a close friend of the scholar Yi I (Yulgok) and an older contemporary of Yi Hwang (T'oegye), leader of the country's "western faction" (sŏin 서인, 西人) of the period.

Sŏng Hon is often referred to by his stylized name of Ugye ("bull valley") and Mugam ("black stone"). He gained eminence not only as a scholar but as a revered politician and reformer, attaining the position of Fourth State Councillor/Vice Prime Minister (Chwach'ansŏng 左贊成) in the State Council of Joseon (Ŭijŏngbu). Sŏng Hon came from the Changnyeong Sŏng clan (창녕 성씨; 昌寧 成氏).

== Selected works ==
- "Ugye chip" (우계집; 牛溪集) (Works of Ugye)
- "Chumun chigyŏl" (주문지결; 朱門旨訣)
- "Wihak chibang" (위학지방; 爲學之方)

== Family ==
He was the great-grandfather of Yun Jeung through the marriage of his daughter, Lady Sŏng. She married Yun Hwang and produced a son, Yun Sŏn'gŏ, who eventually became the parents of Yun Jeung.

- Father
  - Sŏng Such'im (성수침; 成守琛; 6 March 1493 – 7 February 1564); he and his brother became the students of Cho Kwangjo
- Mother
  - Lady Yun of the Papyeong Yun clan (파평 윤씨; 坡平 尹氏)
- Sibling(s)
  - Younger sister - Lady Sŏng of the Changnyeong Sŏng clan (창녕 성씨)
- Spouse - Lady Sin of the Goryeong Sin clan (고령 신씨; 高靈 申氏)
- Issue
  - Son - Sŏng Munyŏng (성문영; 成文泳)
  - Son - Sŏng Munjun (성문준; 成文濬; 1559–1623)
    - Grandson - Sŏng Yŏk (성역; 成櫟)
    - Granddaughter - Lady Sŏng of the Changnyeong Sŏng clan (창녕 성씨)
    - Grandson - Sŏng Ik (성익; 成杙)
    - Granddaughter - Lady Sŏng of the Changnyeong Sŏng clan (창녕 성씨; 1591–1627)
    - Grandson - Sŏng Chik (성직, 成㮨)
    - Granddaughter - Lady Sŏng of the Changnyeong Sŏng clan (창녕 성씨)
  - Daughter - Lady Sŏng of the Changnyeong Sŏng clan (창녕 성씨)
    - Son-in-law - Nam Kungmyŏng (남궁명; 南宮蓂)
    - Unnamed granddaughter
    - Unnamed granddaughter
    - Unnamed grandson
    - Unnamed grandson
    - Unnamed granddaughter
    - Unnamed grandson
  - Unnamed son
  - Unnamed son
  - Unnamed son
  - Daughter - Lady Sŏng of the Changnyeong Sŏng clan (창녕 성씨)
    - Son-in-law - Yun Hwang (윤황; 尹煌; 1572–1639)
      - Grandson - Yun Hun'gŏ (윤훈거; 尹勛擧)
      - Grandson - Yun Sun'gŏ (윤순거; 尹舜擧; 1596–1668)
      - Grandson - Yun Sanggŏ (윤상거; 尹商擧)
      - Grandson - Yun Mun'gŏ (윤문거; 尹文擧; 1606–1672)
      - Grandson - Yun Sŏn'gŏ (윤선거; 尹宣擧; 1610 – 21 April 1669)
        - Great-Grandson - Yun Jeung (윤증; 尹拯; 1629 – 30 January 1714)
      - Grandson - Yun Min'gŏ (윤민거; 尹民擧)
      - Grandson - Yun Kyŏnggŏ (윤경거; 尹耕擧)
      - Grandson - Yun Si'gŏ (윤시거; 尹時擧)
      - Granddaughter - Lady Yun (윤씨)

== See also ==
- Korean Confucianism
- Neo Confucianism
- Yi I
- Yi Hwang
- Chŏng Ku
- Cho Sik
