= Kim Man-jung =

Korean scholar-official (1637–1692)

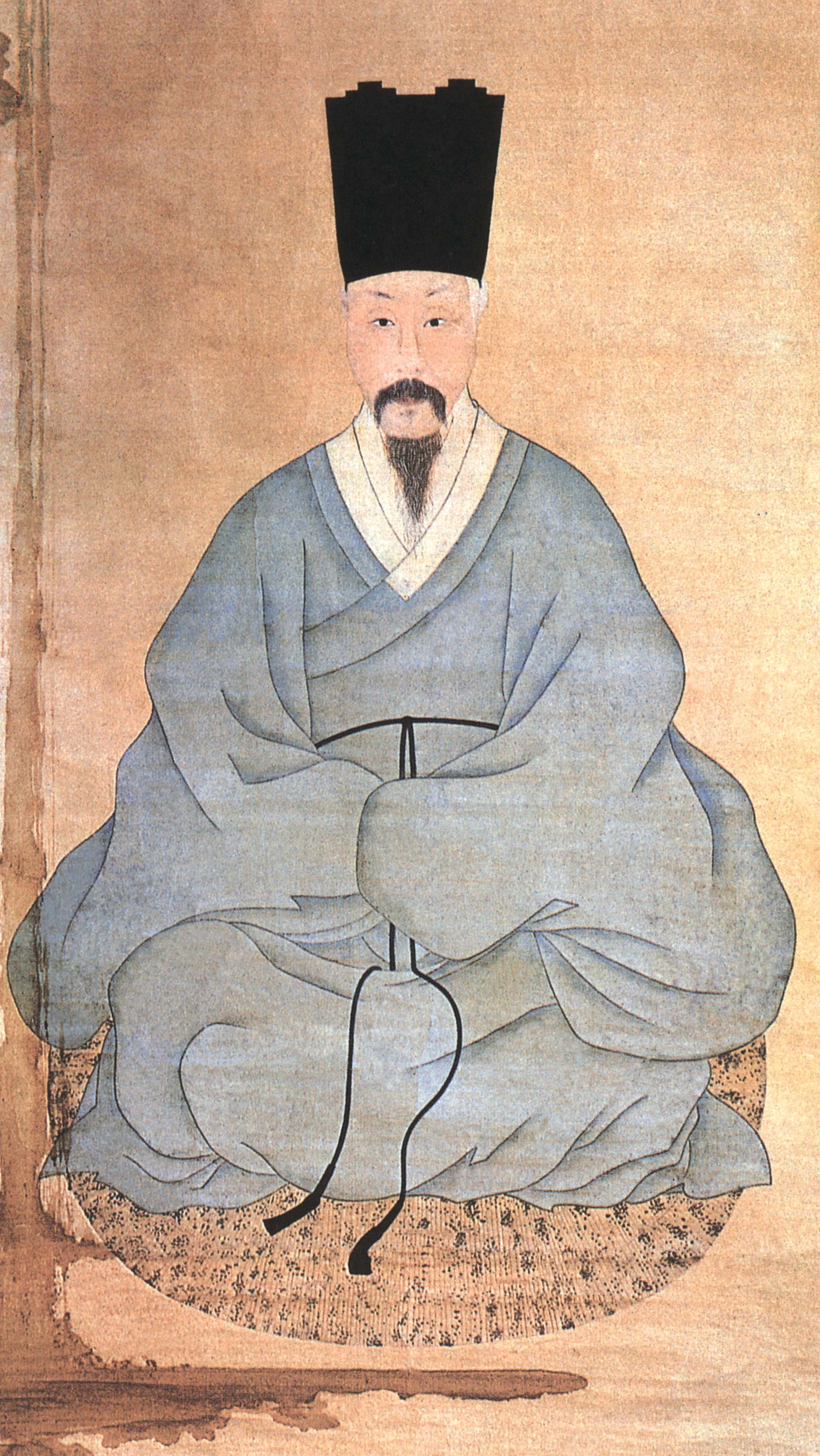
- Born: March 6, 1637
- Died: June 14, 1692 (aged 55)
- Occupation(s): Novelist, politician
- Spouse: Lady Yi
- Parents: Kim Ik-gyeom (father); Lady Yun (mother)
- Relatives: Kim Jang-saeng (great-grandfather); Queen Ingyeong (niece)

- Kim Man-jung
- Hangul: 김만중
- Hanja: 金萬重
- RR: Gim Manjung
- MR: Kim Manjung

Art name
- Hangul: 서포
- Hanja: 西浦
- RR: Seopo
- MR: Sŏp'o

Courtesy name
- Hangul: 중숙
- Hanja: 重叔
- RR: Jungsuk
- MR: Chungsuk

Kim Man-jung (Korean: 김만중; Hanja: 金萬重; 6 March 1637 – 14 June 1692), also romanized as Kim Man-choong, was a Korean novelist and politician. He was one of the eminent Neo-Confucian scholars of the Joseon period.

== Life and work ==
A member of the yangban class, Kim passed the state civil service examination and rose through the official ranks to become an academic counselor and minister during the reign of King Sukjong. He was exiled twice for involvement in the political factionalism of the time.

As a man of letters, his most renowned works were the novels Record of Lady Sa's Trip to the South and The Cloud Dream of the Nine. The former, a novel about family affairs set in China, is a satirical depiction of the political reality of his day and in particular a rebuke of King Sukjong. The latter is one of the most prominent novels of traditional Korea. It is said that Kim wrote The Cloud Dream of the Nine during his second exile. It is an ideal novel dealing with the affairs of life and is centered on the travails of the hero. It has a highly Buddhist overtone, with an emphasis on the transience of worldly glory and pleasure.

== Family ==
- Father
  - Kim Ik-gyeom (김익겸; 金益兼; 1615 – 16 February 1637)
- Mother
  - Lady Yun of the Haepyeong Yun clan (해평 윤씨; 海平 尹氏; 1617–1689)
- Sibling(s)
  - Older brother - Kim Man-gi (김만기; 金萬基; 1633 – 15 March 1687)
- Wife and children
  - Lady Yi of the Yeonan Yi clan (연안 이씨; 1639–1705)
    - Son - Kim Jin-hwa (김진화; 金鎭華; 1655–1714)
    - Daughter - Lady Kim of the Gwangsan Kim clan (광산 김씨; 光山 金氏; 1658–?), Yi Yi-myeong's second wife

== See also ==
- Kim Jang-saeng
- Queen Ingyeong
- Kim Jip
- Kim Ik-hun
