= Song Si-yŏl =

Korean philosopher (1607–1689)

Song Si-yŏl 송시열
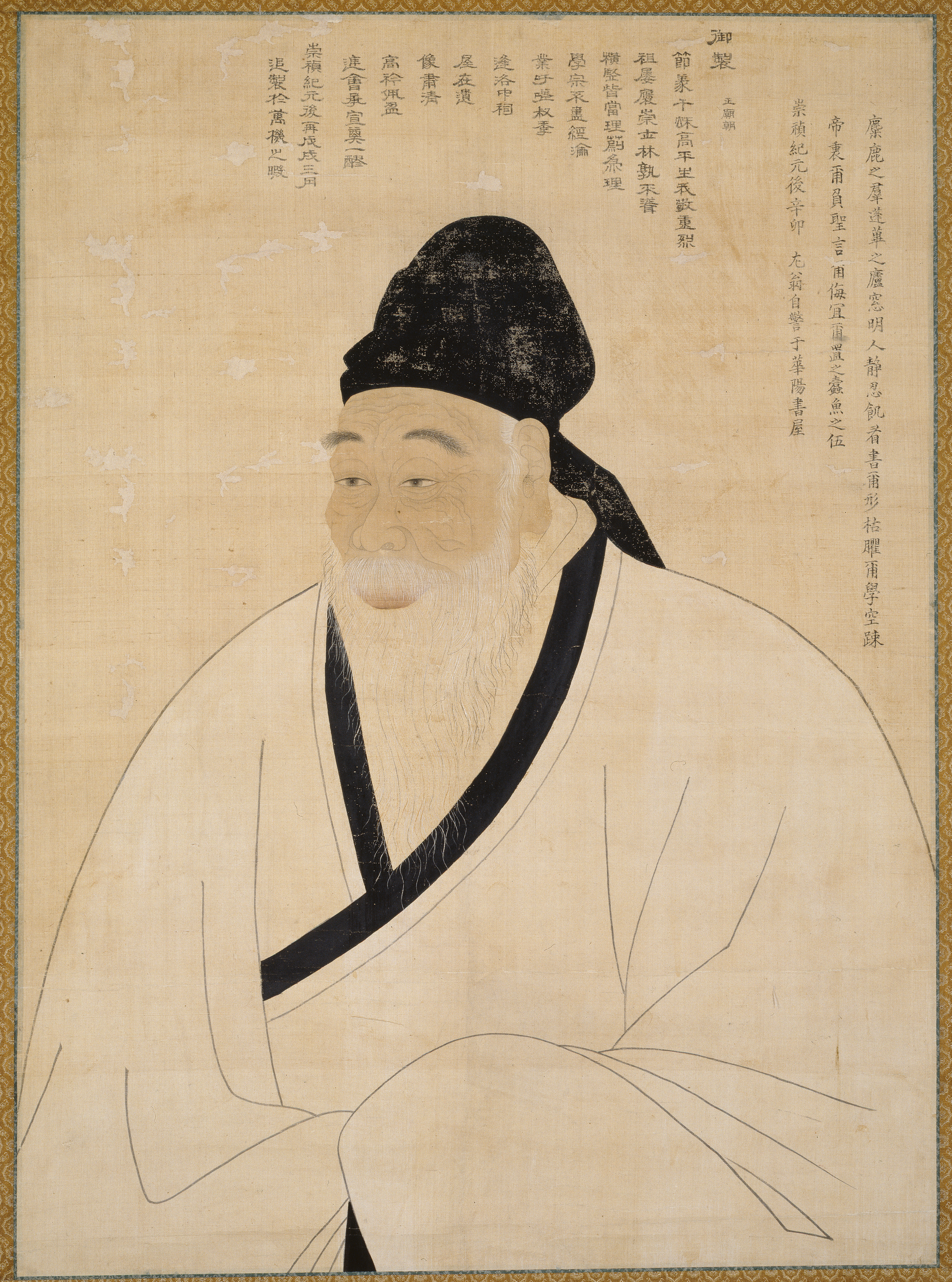

Left State Councillor
- In office 16 July 1673 – 13 September 1673
- Preceded by: Yi Kyŏngŏk
- Succeeded by: Chŏng Ch'ihwa
- In office 11 June 1672 – 29 November 1672
- Preceded by: Chŏng Ch'ihwa
- Succeeded by: Kim Su-hang

Right State Councillor
- In office 19 June 1671 – 11 June 1672
- Preceded by: Hong Chungbo
- Succeeded by: Kim Su-hang
- In office 5 April 1668 – 4 January 1669
- Preceded by: Chŏng Ch'ihwa
- Succeeded by: Hong Chungbo

Personal details
- Born: 1607 Guryong Village, Yinae-myeon, Okcheon-gun, Chungcheong Province, Joseon
- Died: 1689 (aged 81–82) Gaekji, Taein-hyeon, Jeolla Province, Joseon
- Cause of death: Sentenced to death during custody (executed)
- Party: Westerner, later Noron
- Spouse(s): Lady Yi, of the Hansan Yi clan
- Children: Song Sun (1st son); Song Hoe (2nd son); Song Sŏk (3rd son); 4th son; 2 daughters; Song Ki-tae (adopted son)
- Parents: Song Kap-cho (father); Lady Kwak, of the Seonsan Kwak clan (mother)
- Education: Saengwon-si in 1633

Korean name
- Hangul: 송시열
- Hanja: 宋時烈
- RR: Song Siyeol
- MR: Song Siyŏl

Art name
- Hangul: 우암, 우재, 교산노부, 남간노수, 화양동주
- Hanja: 尤庵, 尤齋, 橋山老夫, 南澗老叟, 華陽洞主
- RR: Uam, Ujae, Gyosannobu, Namgannosu, Hwayangdongju
- MR: Uam, Ujae, Kyosannobu, Namgannosu, Hwayangdongju

Courtesy name
- Hangul: 영보, 성뢰, 성래
- Hanja: 英甫, 聖賚, 聖來
- RR: Yeongbo, Seongroe, Seongrae
- MR: Yŏngbo, Sŏngnoe, Sŏngnae

Posthumous name
- Hangul: 문정
- Hanja: 文正
- RR: Munjeong
- MR: Munjŏng

Song Si-yŏl (Korean: 송시열; 1607–1689), also known by his art names Uam (우암) and Ujae (우재) or by the honorific Master Song (송자; 宋子; Songja), was a Korean philosopher and politician. Born in Okcheon, North Chungcheong Province, he was known for his concern with the problems of the common people. He served in governmental service for more than fifty years, and his name features over 3,000 times in the Veritable Records of the Joseon Dynasty, the greatest frequency that any individual is mentioned. He was executed by the royal court for writing an inflammatory letter to the king. There is a monument to him in his hometown. He is also known as the calligrapher who inscribed an epitaph (Chungyeolmyobi Takboncheop) in dedication of Admiral Yi Sunsin, which is preserved at the Chungnyeolsa Shrine (historical site No. 236). He was from the Eunjin Song clan and was close friends with one of his distant relatives, Song Chun-gil.

== Works ==
- Uam chip (우암집; 尤庵集)
- Uam sŏnsang hujip (우암선생후집; 尤菴先生後集)
- Uam yugo (우암유고; 尤菴遺稿)
- Chuja taejŏn (주자대전잡억)
- Songsŏ sŭbyu (송서습유; 宋書拾遺)
- Songsŏ sok sŭbyu (송서속습유; 宋書續拾遺)
- Chuja taejŏn ch'aŭi (주자대전차의; 朱子大全箚疑)
- Jeongseobullyu (정서분류; 程書分類)
- Juja ŏryusobun (주자어류소분; 朱子語類小分)
- Nonmaeng munuit'onggo (논맹문의통고; 論孟問義通攷)
- Simgyŏng sŏgŭi (심경석의; 心經釋義)
- Sambang ch'waryo (삼방촬요; 三方撮要)
- Songja taejŏn (송자대전; 宋子大全)
- Changnŭngjimun (장릉지문; 長陵誌文)
- Yŏngnŭngjimun (영릉지문; 寧陵誌文)
- Sagyesŏnsaenghaengjang (사계선생행장; 沙溪先生行狀)

== Family ==
- Father
  - Song Kap-cho (송갑조; 宋甲祚; 10 December 1574 – 1 April 1628)
- Mother
  - Lady Kwak of the Seonsan Kwak clan (증 정경부인 선산 곽씨; 14 February 1578 – 9 March 1655)
- Wife and children
  - Lady Yi of the Hansan Yi clan (정경부인 한산 이씨; 韓山李氏; 29 October 1606 – 19 March 1677); daughter of Yi Deok-sa (이덕사; 李德泗; 1581–?)
    - Daughter - Lady Song of the Eunjin Song clan (은진 송씨; 恩津 宋氏; 1626–1678)
    - Adoptive son - Song Ki-t'ae (송기태; 宋基泰; 1629–1711); son of Song Si-hyŏng (송시형; 宋時瑩)
    - Daughter - Lady Song of the Eunjin Song clan (은진 송씨; 恩津 宋氏; 1631–1685)
    - Son - Song Sun (송순; 宋純); died prematurely
    - Son - Song Hoe (송회; 宋懷); died prematurely
    - Son - Song Sŏk (송석; 宋惜) died prematurely

== In popular culture ==
- He was portrayed by Ahn Hyung-shik in the 1981 KBS1 TV Series Daemyeong.

== See also ==
- List of Korean philosophers
- Korean philosophy
- Hŏ Mok
- Yun Hyu
- Yun Sŏndo
- Yun Jeung
- Kim Jip
- Kim Jang-saeng
- Song Chun-gil
- Yun Seongeo
- Gwon Sangha
- Kim Seok-ju
