= Yun Hyu =

Joseon scholar-official (1617–1680)

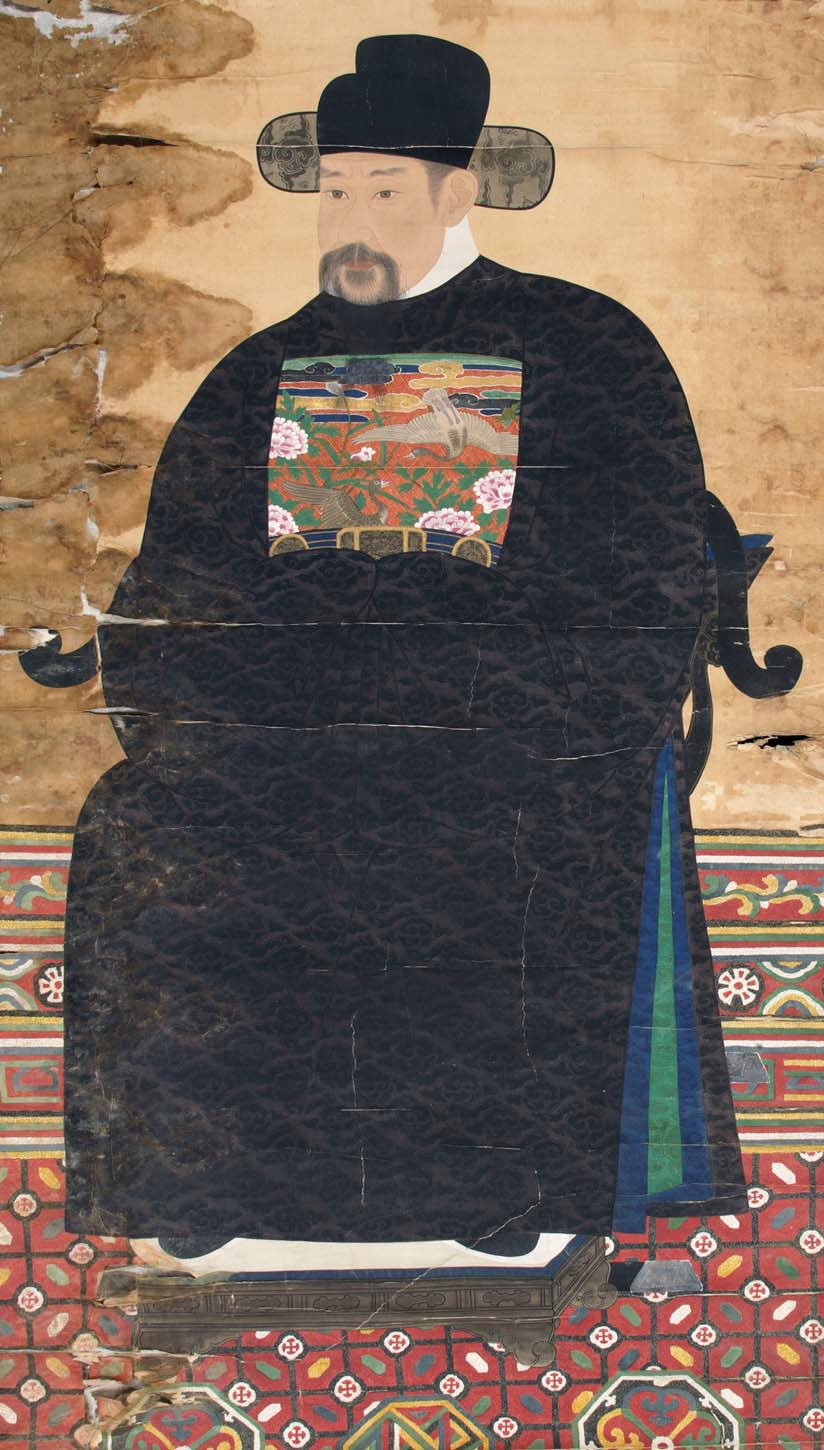

Korean name
- Hangul: 윤휴
- Hanja: 尹鑴
- RR: Yun Hyu
- MR: Yun Hyu

Art name
- Hangul: 백호, 하헌, 야보
- Hanja: 白湖, 夏軒, 冶父
- RR: Baekho, Haheon, Yabo
- MR: Paekho, Hahŏn, Yabo

Courtesy name
- Hangul: 두괴, 희중
- Hanja: 斗魁, 希仲
- RR: Dugoe, Huijung
- MR: Tugoe, Hŭijung

Posthumous name
- Hangul: 문간
- Hanja: 文簡
- RR: Mungan
- MR: Mun'gan

Childhood name
- Hangul: 갱
- Hanja: 鍞
- RR: Gaeng
- MR: Kaeng

Yun Hyu (Korean: 윤휴; Hanja: 尹鑴; 1617–1680) was a Korean Neo-Confucian scholar and official, who lived during the Joseon period. Yun was the political leader of the Southern (Namin) faction of the Joseon Dynasty. His pen names were Paekho, Hahŏn and Yapo.

== Biography ==
In 1617, Yun Hyu was born in Gyeongju, the son of Gyeongju magistrate (부윤; 府尹; puyun) Yun Hyo-jŏn (윤효전; 尹孝全), of the Namwon Yun clan, and his wife Lady Kim, of the Gyeongju Kim clan. Yun's family was affiliated with the Lesser Northerners faction. His childhood name was Kaeng, given by his father's friend, Chŏng Han-kang (정한강; 鄭寒崗). At age 19, he married Lady Kwŏn.

In 1636, during the Qing invasion of Joseon, Yun went to Songnisan, where he encountered Song Si-yŏl for the first time. After hearing of King Injo's capitulation to the Manchus, Yun vowed to not take the gwageo. He moved to Gongju, Chungcheong Province and became a private scholar. He maintained friendships with prominent Easterner figures, such as Song Si-yŏl, Song Chun-gil, and Yu Kye (유계; 兪棨).

He was nominated to be a Jipyeong (지평; 持平) as a Yebinshijeong (예빈시정; 禮賓寺正), and had served in various other posts, before he left politics to dedicate himself to scholarly pursuits.

In 1660, he became a leading figure in the controversy regarding the mourning rituals for King Hyojong. In 1674, he became involved again in a second round of the controversy, this time over the death of Queen Inseon.

In 1680, Yun was expelled and exiled to Gapsan (갑산; 甲山). That year, he was ordered to commit suicide by King Sukjong, after a long public debate with Song Si-yŏl.

== Works ==
- Baekhojeonseo (백호전서; 白湖全書)
- Baekhodokseogi (백호독서기; 白湖讀書記)
- Juryeseol (주례설; 周禮說)
- Hongbeomseol (홍범설; 洪範說)
- Jungyongdaehakhuseol (중용대학후설; 中庸大學後說)
- Jungyongseol (중용설; 中庸說)
- Baekhojip (백호집; 白湖集)

== See also ==
- List of Korean philosophers
- Korean philosophy
- Hŏ Mok
- Song Si-yŏl
- Yun Sŏndo
- List of Korean-language poets
- Korean literature
