= Yun Jeung =

Korean Confucian scholar

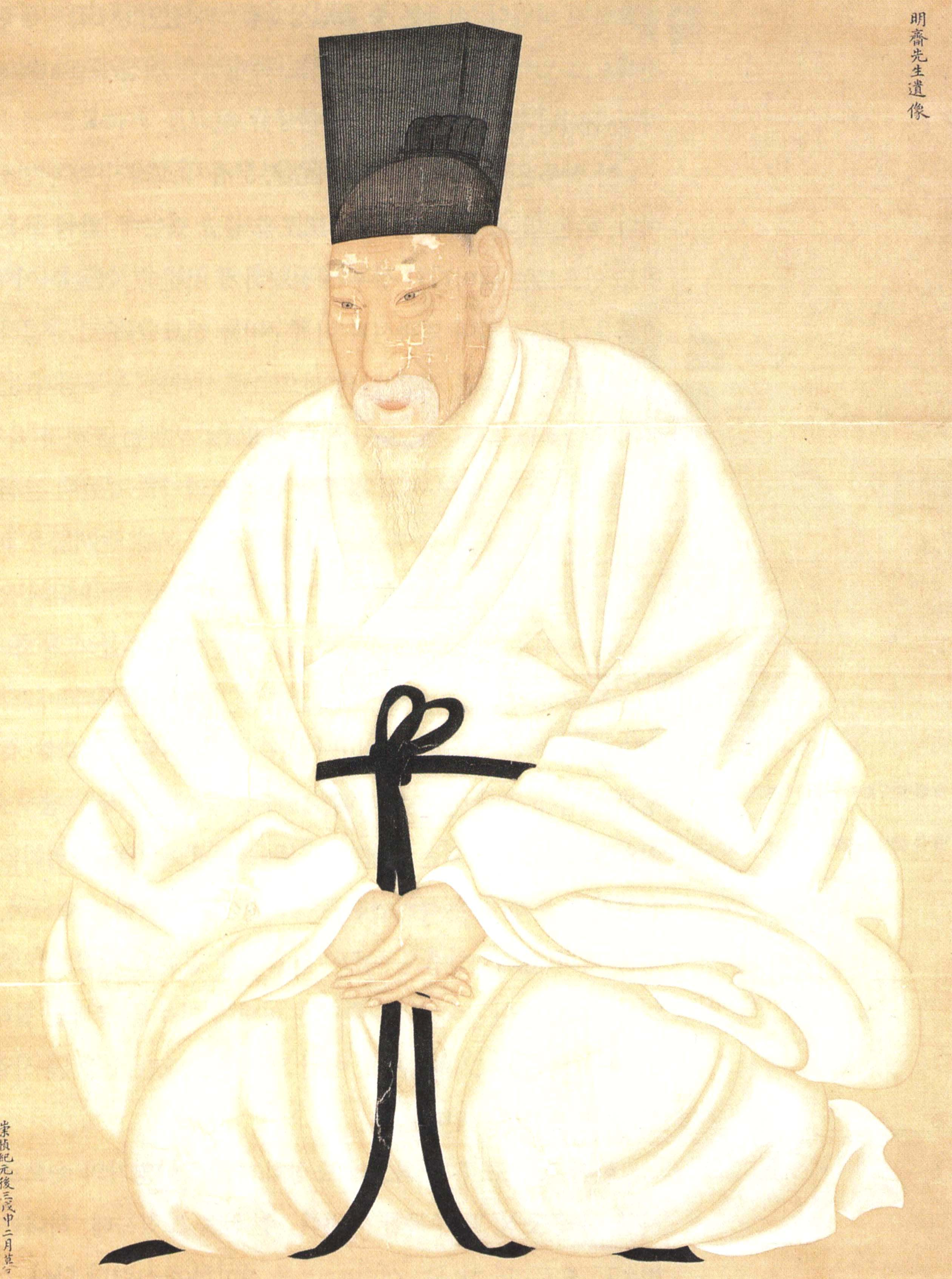

Korean name
- Hangul: 윤증
- Hanja: 尹拯
- RR: Yun Jeung
- MR: Yun Chŭng

Yun Jeung or Yun Chŭng (Korean: 윤증; Hanja: 尹拯; 1629 – 30 January 1714) was a Confucian scholar in Korea during the late period of the Joseon dynasty. He was known as being a progressive thinker and for his opposition to the formalism and ritualism in the predominant philosophy of Chu Hsi. Yun Chung refused government office because he thought the Korean monarchy was corrupt, and spend his life teaching Sirhak ideas. He is known for the quote, "The king could exist without the people, but the people could not exist without the king."

Yun held ideological debates with Song Si-yeol, known as the Hoeni Sibi (懷尼是非,"The Right and Wrong Between Song and Yun"), over the matters of ritualism and politics.

Yun may also considered an early feminist, as he praised and honored female scholars of Confucianism, a position that was typically reserved for males.

He came from the Papyeong Yun clan (파평 윤씨; 坡平 尹氏).

== Biography ==
Yun was born in 1629 in Jungseonbang (貞善坊, now Jongno). In 1642, he studied Neo confucianism with his father in a mountain.

== Family ==
- Father
  - Yun Seon-geo (윤선거; 尹宣擧; 1610 – 21 April 1669)
- Mother
  - Lady Yi of the Gongju Yi clan (공주 이씨)
- Sibling(s)
  - Younger sister - Lady Yun (윤씨)
  - Younger sister - Lady Yun (윤씨)
  - Younger sister - Lady Yun (윤씨)
  - Younger brother - Yun Chu (윤추; 尹推; 1632–1707)
  - Younger brother - Yun Jol (윤졸; 尹拙)
  - Younger brother - Yun Eub (윤읍; 尹挹)
- Spouse
  - Lady Kwon of the Andong Kwon clan (안동 권씨); eldest daughter
- Issue
  - Son - Yun Haeng-gyo (윤행교; 尹行敎)
  - Son - Yun Chung-gyo (윤충교; 尹忠敎)
  - Daughter - Lady Yun (윤씨)
    - Son-in-law - Im Jin-yeong (임진영; 任震英)

== Works ==
- Myeongjaeyugo (명재유고; 明齋遺顧)
- Myeongjaeuiryemundap (명재의례문답; 明齋疑禮問答)
- Myeongjaeyuseo (명재유서)
