= Yi I =

Korean Confucian scholar (1536–1584)

- Hangul: 이이
- Hanja: 李珥
- RR: I I
- MR: I I

Art name
- Hangul: 율곡
- Hanja: 栗谷
- RR: Yulgok
- MR: Yulgok

Courtesy name
- Hangul: 숙헌
- Hanja: 叔獻
- RR: Sukheon
- MR: Sukhŏn

Yi I (Korean: 이이; Hanja: 李珥; 1536–1584) was a Korean philosopher, writer, and Confucian scholar of the Joseon period. Yi is often referred to by his art name Yulgok ("Chestnut valley"). He was also a politician and was the academical successor of Cho Kwangjo.

== Biography ==
Yi was born in Gangneung, Gangwon Province in 1536 into the Deoksu Yi clan. His father was a Left Second State Councillor (좌찬성; jwachanseong) Yi Won-su, and his mother, Shin Saimdang, was an accomplished artist and calligrapher. He was the grandnephew of Yi Ki, Chief State Councilor from 1549 to 1551.

In his early years, he was a student of Baek In-geol, the successor of Cho Kwangjo. It is said that by the age of seven he had finished his lessons in the Confucian classics, and passed the Civil Service literary examination at the age of 13. Yi secluded himself in Kumgang-san following his mother's death when he was 16 and stayed for 3 years, studying Buddhism. He left the mountains at 20 and devoted himself to studying Neo-Confucianism.

He married at 22, and visited Yi Hwang at Dosan the following year. He passed special exams with top honors with a winning thesis titled Cheondochaek (천도책; 天道策; lit. 'Book on the Way of Heaven'), which was widely regarded as a literary masterpiece, displaying his knowledge of history and the Confucian philosophy of politics, and also reflecting his profound knowledge of Taoism. He continuously received top honors on civil exams for a consecutive 9 times. His father died when he was 26. He served in various positions in government from the age of 29, and visited the Ming dynasty as seojanggwan (서장관; 書狀官; lit. 'document officer') in 1568. He also participated in the writing of the Myeongjong Annals and at 34, authored Dongho Mundap, an eleven-article political memorial devoted to clarifying his conviction that a righteous government could be achieved.

Due to his vast experience in different offices over the years, Yi was able to garner a wide vision of politics and with the deep trust of the king, became one of the central figures of politics by the time he was 40. His many documents and theses were presented to the royal court but when political conflicts escalated in 1576, his efforts proved fruitless and he returned home. Following his return, he devoted his time to studies and education of his disciples and authored several books.

He returned to office at 45 and while holding various minister positions, produced many writings which recorded crucial political events and showed his efforts to ease the political conflicts that were rampant at that time. However, King Seonjo was noncommittal in his attitude and it became difficult for Yi to remain in a neutral position in the conflicts. He left office in 1583 and died the following year.

According to legend, he had a pavilion built near the ford of the Imjin River in his lifetime and instructed his heirs to set it ablaze when the king had to flee northward from Seoul, to provide a guiding beacon. This took place during Hideyoshi's invasions of Korea at the Japanese invasions of Korea (1592–1598).

== Teachings ==
Yi was not only known as a philosopher but also as a social reformer. He did not completely agree with the dualistic Neo-Confucianism teachings followed by Yi Hwang. His school of Neo-Confucianism placed emphasis on the more concrete, material elements; rather than inner spiritual perception, this practical and pragmatic approach valued external experience and learning. Unlike Yi Hwang, who suffered through tumultuous times and did not enjoy being in politics, Yi was an active official who thought it important to implement Confucian values and principles to government administration. He emphasized sage learning and self-cultivation as the base of proper administration.

Yi is also well known for his foresight about national security. He proposed to draft and reinforce the army against a possible Japanese attack. His proposal was rejected by the central government. He died afterwards, before the start of the Imjin war.

== Selected works ==
These are some of Yi's published writings:

- Questions and Answers at East Lake (동호문답; 東湖問答) - Eleven articles about political reform.
- Memorial in Ten Thousand Words (만언봉사; 萬言封事) - Suggestions about Confucian learning, self-cultivation, and application to government administration.
- The Essentials of the Studies of the Sages (성학집요; 聖學輯要) - Fundamentals of Confucian ethics, self-cultivation and statecraft.
- The Secret of Expelling Ignorance (격몽요결; 擊蒙要訣) - Systematic guide of learning.
- Daily Records of Lectures before the Throne (경연일기; 經筵日記) - Record of political events and happenings.
- The Complete Works of Yulgok (율곡전서; 栗谷全書) was compiled after his death on the basis of the writings he bequeathed.

== Legacy ==
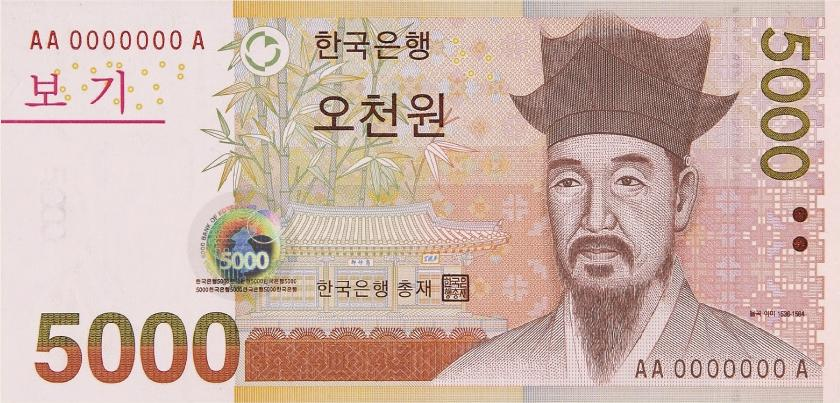
Yi on the currently circulating 5,000 won note

Yulgongno, a street in central Seoul, is named after him, and he is depicted on the South Korean 5,000 won note.

The Taekwon-Do pattern Yul-Gok was also named in his honor. This is the pattern required to advance from 5th geup (급) green belt with blue tag to 4th geup blue belt. The 38 movements of this pattern refer to his birthplace on the 38th degree latitude.

The "Yulgok Project", a modernization project for the South Korean military, is named after him as well.

== Family ==
- Father: Yi Won-su (이원수; 李元秀; 1501–1561)
  - Grandfather: Yi Cheon (이천)
- Mother: Shin Saimdang (신사임당; 1504–1551)
  - Grandfather: Shin Myeong-hwa (신명화; 申命和)
  - Grandmother: Lady Yi of the Yongin Yi clan (용인 이씨; 龍仁 李氏)
- Siblings
  - Older brother: Yi Seon (이선)
  - Older sister: Yi Mae-chang (이매창; 李梅窓), Lady Yi of the Deoksu Yi clan
  - Older brother: Yi Byeon (이번)
  - Older sister: Lady Yi of the Deoksu Yi clan (덕수 이씨; 德水 李氏)
  - Younger sister: Lady Yi of the Deoksu Yi clan (덕수 이씨; 德水 李氏)
  - Younger brother: Yi Woo (이우; 李瑀; 1542–1609)
- Wife and children:
  - Lady No of the Goksan No clan (곡산 노씨; ? – 1592)
    - Daughter: Lady Yi (이씨)
      - Son-in-law: Kim Jip (김집; 金集; 1574–1656)
        - Grandson: Kim Ik-hyeong (김익형; 金益炯)
        - Grandson: Kim Ik-ryeon (김익련; 金益煉)
- Concubines
  - Lady Kim (김씨)
  - Lady Yi of the Gyeongju Yi clan (경주 이씨; 慶州 李氏)

== Popular culture ==
- Portrayed by Jung Joon-won in the 2017 SBS TV series Saimdang, Memoir of Colors.

== See also ==
- Korean Confucianism
- Yi Hwang
- Korean philosophy
- List of Joseon dynasty people
- History of Korea
