= Yun Sŏndo =

Korean poet (1587–1671)

- Born: 1587; Hansŏng, Joseon
- Died: 1671 (aged 83–84)
- Relatives: Yun Tusŏ (grand-son)

- Yun Sŏndo
- Hangul: 윤선도
- Hanja: 尹善道
- RR: Yun Seondo
- MR: Yun Sŏndo

Art name
- Hangul: 고산, 해옹
- Hanja: 孤山, 海翁
- RR: Gosan, Haeong
- MR: Kosan, Haeong

Courtesy name
- Hangul: 약이
- Hanja: 約而
- RR: Yaki
- MR: Yagi

Yun Sŏndo (Korean: 윤선도; Hanja: 尹善道; 1587–1671) was a Korean philosopher, poet, and politician. A Neo-Confucian scholar, he was also known by his art names Kosan and Haeong.

== Life ==
He was born in Seoul, Joseon. He achieved early success as a government official, but his straightforward character earned him enemies at court, and he was banished for imprudent criticism of those in power. Thirteen years later, he returned to serve as tutor to the royal princes but was banished again. He spent most of his 85 years in his rustic country home, contemplating the nature of life, teaching, and writing poetry.

Yun is considered the greatest master of the sijo form in Korean literature. His most famous composition is The Fisherman's Calendar (어부사시사, 1651) a cycle of forty seasonal sijo. In both Chinese and Korean classical poetry, the fisherman symbolized a wise man who lives simply and naturally. In art, the fisherman appeared almost invariably in one of the most common genres of Asian water colors: sets of four paintings, one for each season of the year.

Yun Sŏndo wove both traditions into The Fisherman's Calendar. It is the longest and most ambitious sijo cycle attempted during the classical period of his life.

Some lines are given below from a translation of the Autumn section by Gross.

A fisherman's life is idyllic, away from cares of the world...

Do not mock the old fisherman, you'll see him in every painting.

I look back on the world of men, the farther off the better.

And from Five Friends.

Moon, you watch but keep silent; isn't that what a good friend does?

== Works ==
- Gosan seonsaeng yugo (고산선생유고; 孤山先生遺稿)
- Byeoljip (별집; 別集)
- Yakhwaje (약화제; 藥和劑)
- Cheobangjeonseonchangyak (처방전선창약; 癬瘡藥)
- Hoechungyak (회충약; 蛔蟲藥)
- Haesuyak (해수약; 咳嗽藥)
- Bokhaksinbang (복학신방; 腹학神方)
- Uyeoksinbang (우역신방; 牛疫神方)
- Oseonjubang (오선주방; 五仙酒方)

== See also ==
- List of Korean-language poets
- Korean literature
- Hŏ Mok
- Chŏng Ku
- Yun Hyu
- Song Si-yŏl
- Song Chun-gil
- Yun Tusŏ
- Bogildo Yun Seondo garden
