= Noh Young-hak =

South Korean actor

- Born: April 1, 1993 (age 33); Seoul, South Korea
- Education: Actor
- Occupations: Shinhan University; Sogang University
- Years active: 2002–present
- Agent: K美Star Entertainment

Korean name
- Hangul: 노영학
- RR: No Yeonghak
- MR: No Yŏnghak

Noh Young-hak (born April 1, 1993) is a South Korean actor. He began his career as a child actor, and has since appeared in several television series.

== Filmography ==
=== Film ===
Year	Title	Role	Notes
2008	Unforgettable	Jae-yong	
2011	Sin of a Family	Jo Kyung-soo	
2014	Tuning Fork	Lee Young-joon	
2015	Minority Opinion	Kim Hee-taek	Cameo
2015	The Long Way Home	Staff sergeant Choi	
2019	Seongamdo	Dual swordsman	
2020	Boys Be!	Hyun-tae	
2021	Mission: Possible	Hacker	
2021	Homecoming 1930	Moo-young	
2022	2037	Correctional officer	
2022	Fight for the Seat 815	Myung-jin	
TBA	Open the Door		Upcoming

=== Television series ===
Year	Title	Role	Notes
2002–2004	Magic Kid Masuri		
2004	Oolla Boolla Blue-jjang		
2006	Hwarang Fighter Maru	Ho-tae	
2007–2008	The King and I	Grand Prince Jinseong	
2008	The Great King, Sejong	Prince Gyeongnyeong (young)	
2008	Iljimae	Soo-mak	Guest (episodes 1–2)
2008	Gourmet	Lee Sung-chan (young)	
2009	Queen Seondeok	Suk-poom (young)	
2010	The Reputable Family	Kim Won-il (young)	
2010	Giant	Jo Min-woo (young)	
2010	Road No. 1	Heo Chan-sik	
2010	Drama Special Series – "Rock, Rock, Rock"	Kim Tae-won's brother	
2010–2011	Pure Pumpkin Flower	Oh Hyo-joon (young)	
2011	The Duo	Chun-doong (young)	
2011	Gyebaek	Uija (young)	
2011–2012	Insu, the Queen Mother	Grand Prince Haeyang	
2012	Drama Special Series – "Little Girl Detective Park Hae-sol"	Kim Jin-hyuk	
2012–2013	Dream of the Emperor	Kim Yu-sin (young)	
2012–2013	The Great Seer	Lee Jung-geun (young)	
2013	7th Grade Civil Servant	Kim Min-ho	
2013	Don't Look Back: The Legend of Orpheus	Oh Joon-young (young)	
2013	Goddess of Fire	Prince Gwanghae (young)	
2013	Who Are You?	Im Sung-chan	
2013–2014	Hold My Hand	Han Joon-young	
2014	Triangle	Jang Dong-soo (young)	
2014–2015	KBS TV Novel – "Single-minded Dandelion"	Kang Dong-soo / Jin Do-young	
2015	The Jingbirok: A Memoir of Imjin War	Prince Gwanghae	
2015	The Man in the Mask	Ha Dae-chul (young)	
2015	Second 20s	Na Soon-nam	
2015–2016	Sweet, Savage Family	Chul-yi	
2016	The Master of Revenge	Ha Jung-tae (young)	
2016–2017	KBS TV Novel – "That Sun in the Sky"	Cha Min-woo	
2017	Saimdang, Memoir of Colors	Crown Prince Lee Ho (past) / Rod (present)	
2019	Haechi	Prince Yeollyeong	Guest (episodes 1–8)
2020	Team Bulldog: Off-Duty Investigation	Park Jae-min	Guest (episodes 6, 8–9)
2022	Doctor Lawyer	Jung Hee-kyung	

=== Web ===
Year	Title	Role	Notes
2018	The Birth of a Pro 2	Jang Soo-dong	Web series

== Awards and nominations ==
Year	Award	Category	Nominated work	Result
2012	26th KBS Drama Awards	Best Young Actor	Dream of the Emperor	Won
