= Hwang Hŭi =

Joseon scholar-official (1363–1452)

Hwang Hŭi 황희
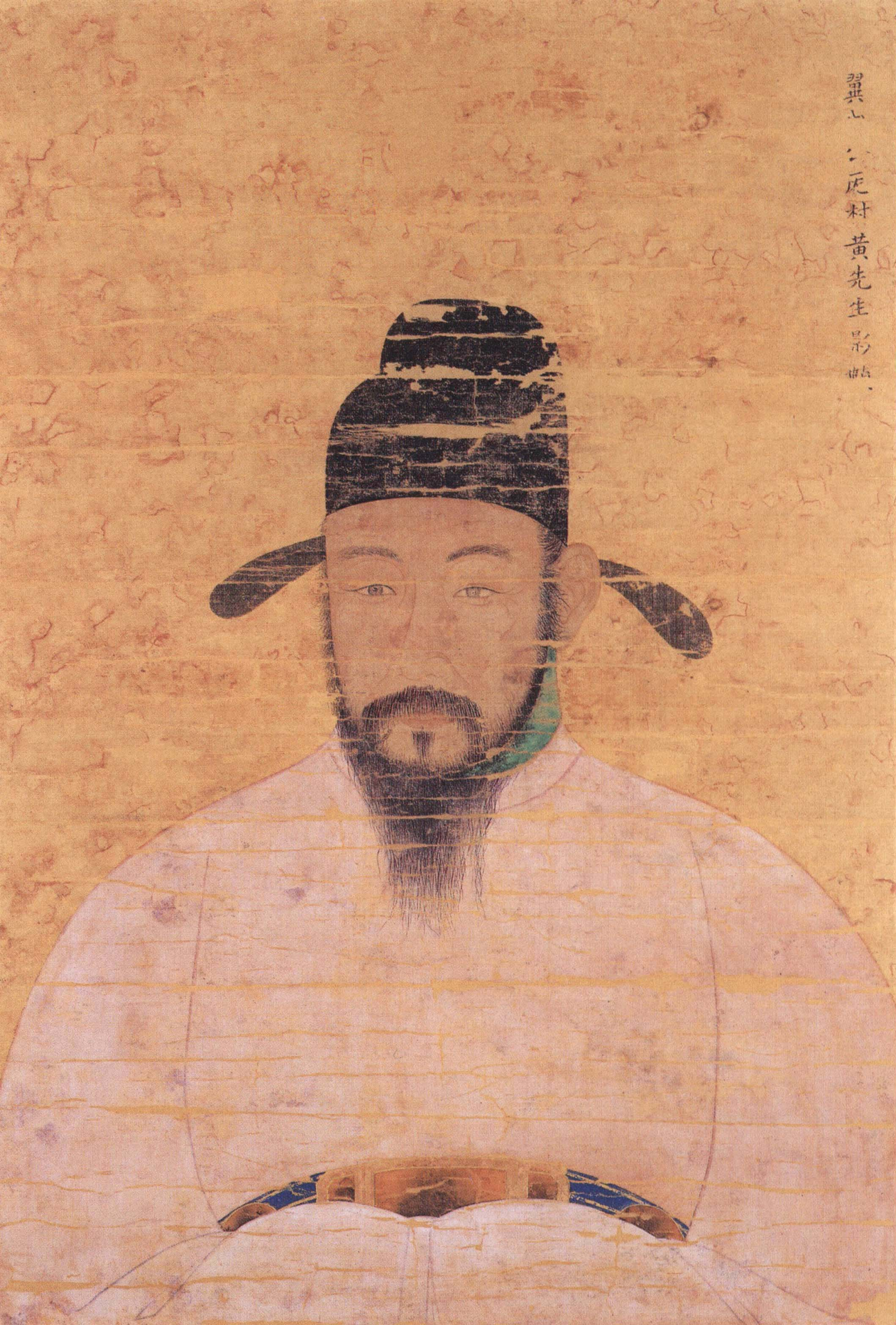

Chief State Councillor
- In office 8 October 1431 – 21 October 1449
- Preceded by: Ku Chong-gil
- Succeeded by: Ha Yŏn

Left State Councillor
- In office 21 February 1427 – 9 December 1430
- Preceded by: Yi Chik
- Succeeded by: Maeng Sa-sŏng

Right State Councillor
- In office 18 July 1426 – 21 February 1427
- Preceded by: Cho Yŏn
- Succeeded by: Maeng Sa-sŏng

Personal details
- Born: 1363
- Died: 1452 (aged 88–89)
- Spouse(s): Lady Ch'oe; Lady Yang, of the Cheongju Yang clan
- Children: Lady Hwang; Hwang Ch'i-sin; Hwang Po-sin; Hwang Su-sin; Hwang Chik-sin; Lady Hwang
- Parents: Hwang Kun-sŏ (father); Lady Kim, of the Yonggung Kim clan (mother)

Korean name
- Hangul: 황희
- Hanja: 黃喜
- RR: Hwang Hui
- MR: Hwang Hŭi

Art name
- Hangul: 방촌
- Hanja: 厖村
- RR: Bangchon
- MR: Pangch'on

Courtesy name
- Hangul: 구부
- Hanja: 懼夫
- RR: Gubu
- MR: Kubu

Posthumous name
- Hangul: 익성
- Hanja: 翼成
- RR: Ikseong
- MR: Iksŏng

Childhood name
- Hangul: 수로
- Hanja: 壽老
- RR: Suro
- MR: Suro

Hwang Hŭi (Korean: 황희; Hanja: 黃喜; 1363–1452) was a politician of the Goryeo and Joseon dynasties, who came from the Jangsu Hwang clan and served as Chief State Councilor of the Joseon dynasty from 1431 to 1449.

== Biography ==
Hwang Hŭi was an official of Goryeo. He became an official of Joseon in 1394. Hwang Hŭi was once banished from Seoul because he advocated for Yangnyeong, the eldest prince of King Taejong, despite his bad behavior in 1418. After King Sejong the Great's enthronement, Hwang Hŭi got reappointed and held many ministerial posts. Hwang Hŭi was appointed as a prime minister in 1431 and served until 1449. He retired from the government after 18 years.

== Achievement ==
He distributed grain seeds for improving farming, and ordered each province to plant a lot of mulberry trees to enrich human life. In addition, the publication of 'economic land' was divided into '續 典' and '集', which allowed the contents to be duplicated, omitted or separated from the content and reality.

Meanwhile, a defense measure was taken to prevent the North's wildling and southern regions by paying attention to defense issues. And in an effort to obtain a wide range of good manners, the etiquette of Goryeo was revised and supplemented, taking into account the reality of the Ming and Joseon dynasties.

== Description of Hwang Hŭi ==
He served as the Yeonguijeong, the highest ranking of three appointed royal prime ministers (the others being Uuijeong and Jwaguijeong) for a total of 18 years with a total of 24 years service to the monarchy. He was noted for his political philosophy that stated, "That which is just takes priority and must be enacted." Priorities during his administration included agricultural improvement, mitigating laws that increased social class gaps, and providing opportunities for candidates born out of wedlock or from concubines to take the civil service examination.

== Family ==
- Father: Hwang Kun-sŏ (황군서, 黃君瑞; 1328–1402)
- Mother: Lady Kim of the Yonggung Kim clan (용궁 김씨; d. 1427)
- Wives and children:
  - Lady Ch'oe (최씨); daughter of Ch'oe An (최안; 崔安)
    - 1st daughter: Lady Hwang (황씨)
  - Lady Yang of the Cheongju Yang clan (정경부인 청주 양씨); daughter of Yang Chin (양진; 楊震) and they married in 1388.
    - 1st son: Hwang Ch'i-sin (황치신; 黃致身)
    - 2nd son: Hwang Po-sin (황보신; 黃保身)
    - 3rd son: Hwang Su-sin (황수신; 黃守身)
    - 4th son: Hwang Chik-sin (황직신; 黃直身);
    - 2nd daughter: Lady Hwang (황씨)

== In popular culture ==
- Portrayed by Kim Kap-soo in the 2008 KBS2 TV series The Great King, Sejong
- Portrayed by Jeon Seung-hwan in the 2011 SBS TV series Deep Rooted Tree.
- Portrayed by Baek Yoon-sik in the 2012 film I Am the King.
- Portrayed by Kim Kap-soo in the 2015 MBC TV series Splash Splash Love.
- Portrayed by Kwon Hwa-woon in the 2015–2016 SBS TV series Six Flying Dragons.
- Portrayed by Jung Han-yong in the 2016 KBS1 TV series Jang Yeong-sil.

== See also ==
- Sejong the Great
- Maeng Saseong
