= Li Fangyuan =

Li Fangyuan may refer to following individuals of which name in Chinese character can be transliterated to Hanyu Pinyin:

- 李芳園 (Lǐ Fāngyuán; approximately 1850—approximately 1901), Qing dynasty musician, see Pipa#Repertoire
- 李芳遠 (Lǐ Fāngyuǎn; 1367–1422), the third monarch of the Joseon dynasty
