= Grand Prince Yangnyŏng =

Joseon prince (1394–1462)

Crown Prince of Joseon
- Tenure: 19 September 1404 – 15 July 1418
- Predecessor: Crown Prince Pangwŏn
- Successor: Crown Prince To
- Born: 1394; Hanseong, Joseon
- Died: 8 October 1462 (aged 67–68); Hanseong, Joseon
- Burial: Yangnyŏngdaegunmyo, Seoul, South Korea
- Spouse: Grand Princess Consort Suseong (m. 1407; died 1456)
- Issue Detail: 10 sons, 17 daughters
Names
- Yi Che (이제; 李禔)
Posthumous name
- Gangjeong (강정; 剛靖)
- Clan: Jeonju Yi
- Dynasty: Yi
- Father: King Taejong
- Mother: Queen Wongyeong
- Religion: Confucianism (Neo-Confucianism)

Korean name
- Hangul: 양녕대군
- Hanja: 讓寧大君
- RR: Yangnyeong daegun
- MR: Yangnyŏng taegun

Courtesy name
- Hangul: 후백
- Hanja: 厚伯
- RR: Hubaek
- MR: Hubaek

Grand Prince Yangnyŏng (Korean: 양녕대군; Hanja: 讓寧大君; 1394 – 8 October 1462), personal name Yi Che, was the eldest surviving son of King Taejong, the 3rd monarch of Joseon, and Queen Wongyeong. He was invested as crown prince at the age of 12, but ultimately lost his position in favor of his younger brother who went on to become Sejong the Great. His descendants include Syngman Rhee, the first president of South Korea.

== Biography ==
Yi Che was born in 1394, but the exact date is unknown. At the time, Joseon had just been founded and his grandfather, King Taejo, was on the throne.

Yi Che became crown prince four years after King Taejong's accession. Known for his dislike of study and misconduct, he often clashed with his father.

In 1415, he caused a scandal when he had an affair with Cho-gung-jang, a courtesan belonging to his uncle, King Jeongjong; he had been unaware that she was his uncle's woman. In 1417, he secretly brought Eo-ri, a concubine of Gwak Seon, into the palace. Angered, Taejong banished Yi Che to the residence of his father-in-law, Kim Han-ro (김한로), who arranged rendezvous between Yi Che and Eo-ri. For a while, Taejong did not fault his son for his libertine proclivities, but instead held Kim Han-ro accountable for his improprieties. However, Yi Che accused Taejong of hypocrisy, criticizing his father for punishing him over his affair with Eo-ri, while Taejong himself maintained numerous concubines.

Yi Che was deposed on 15 July 1418. He reportedly neither cried nor showed signs of sadness. He was expelled from the palace and relocated to Gwangju County. Two months later, his younger brother, Yi To (posthumously King Sejong), acceded to the throne.

After Sejong became king, the relationship between the brothers strengthened, with Sejong often inviting Yi Che to the palace. During King Sejo's reign, he enjoyed the status of the most senior member of the royal family.

Yi Che died in 1462, around the age of 68. He was buried in present-day Sangdo-dong, Dongjak District, Seoul.

== Family ==
- Father: King Taejong (태종대왕; 21 June 1367 – 8 June 1422)
  - Grandfather: King Taejo (태조대왕; 4 November 1335 – 27 June 1408)
  - Grandmother: Queen Sinui (신의왕후), of the Cheongju Han clan (청주 한씨; 6 October 1337 – 25 November 1391)
- Mother: Queen Wongyeong (원경왕후), of the Yeoheung Min clan (여흥 민씨; 6 August 1365 – 27 August 1420)
  - Grandfather: Min Che (민제), Internal Prince Yŏhŭng (여흥부원군; 1339 – 13 October 1408)
  - Grandmother: Grand Princess Consort of Samhan State (삼한국대부인), of the Yeosan Song clan (여산 송씨; 1342–1414)

Consort(s) and their respective issue

- Grand Princess Consort Suseong (수성군부인), of the Gwangsan Kim clan (광산 김씨; ? – 28 February 1456)
  - Commandery Princess Jaeryeong (재령군주; 1409–?), first daughter (Note: Also known as County Princess Jeonui (전의현주).) (Note: Married Yi Ja (이자) from the Yeoju Yi clan (여주 이씨). They had issue (2 sons, 3 daughters).)
  - Yi Ae (이애), Prince Sunseong (순성군; 18 July 1414 – 3 October 1462), first son (Note: ▪︎1st wife: Lady, of the Pyongsan Shin clan (평산 신씨; ?–1453). ▪︎2nd wife: Lady, of the Yeonil Jeong clan (연일 정씨); concubine-born daughter of Jeong Jong-seong (정종성) and granddaughter of Jeong Mong-ju — Demoted to concubine. ▪︎Issue: 4 sons, 4 daughters.)
  - Yi Po (이포), Prince Hamyang (함양군; 1416 – 13 July 1474), second son (Note: ▪︎Wife: Princess Consort Taein (태인군부인), of the Goseong Yi clan (고성 이씨). ▪︎Issue: 6 sons.)
  - Yi Hye (이혜), Prince Seosan (서산군; 1420–1451), third son (Note: ▪︎Wife: Princess Consort Yangcheon (양천군부인), of the Ansan Kim clan (안산 김씨; ?–1464); daughter of Kim Gae (김개). ▪︎Issue: 2 sons.)
  - Lady, of the Jeonju Yi clan (전주 이씨), second daughter (Note: Married Yi Beon (이번) from the Gyeongju Yi clan (경주 이씨).)
  - County Princess Yeongpyeong (영평현주), third daughter (Note: Married Kim Cheol-gyun (김철균) from the (old) Andong Kim clan (구 안동 김씨).)
  - Lady, of the Jeonju Yi clan (전주 이씨), fourth daughter (Note: Married Park Su-jong (박수종) from the Miryang Park clan (밀양 박씨).)
  - Commandery Princess Yangcheon (영천군주), fifth daughter
- Courtesan Bong-ji-ryeon (봉지련)
- Unknown concubine
  - Yi Gyeom (이겸), Gojeong Bujeong (고정부정), fourth son (Note: See Styles and titles in Joseon#Royal family (Monarch's male descendants and their principal consorts).) (Note: ▪︎Wife: Lady, of the Hampyeong No clan (함평 노씨); daughter of No Gil-chang (노길창). ▪︎Issue: 1 son, 1 daughter.)
  - Yi Heun (이흔), Jangpyeong Dojeong (장평도정; 1438–?), fifth son (Note: ▪︎1st wife: Lady, of the Papyeong Yun clan (파평 윤씨). ▪︎2nd wife: Lady, of the Jinju Kang clan (진주 강씨); daughter of Kang Wi (강위). ▪︎Issue: 2 sons, 5 daughters; among his descendants is the 1st president of South Korea, Syngman Rhee.)
  - Yi Seong (이성), Gyecheon Dojeong (계천도정), sixth son (Note: ▪︎Wife: Lady, of the Uiryeong Nam clan (의령 남씨); daughter of Nam Cheok (남척). ▪︎Issue: 1 daughter.)
  - Yi Sun (이순), Bongsan Bujeong (봉산부정), seventh son (Note: ▪︎Wife: Lady, of the Jeonju Choe clan (전주 최씨); daughter of Choe Yun-hyeong (최윤형). ▪︎Issue: 1 daughter.)
  - Yi Sim (이심), Anchang Bujeong (안창부정), eighth son (Note: ▪︎Wife: Lady, of the Jinju Kang clan (진주 강씨); daughter of Kang Cheo-jeong (강처정). ▪︎Issue: 3 sons.)
  - Yi Gwang-seok (이광석), Dolsan Bujeong (돌산부정), ninth son (Note: ▪︎Wife: Lady, of the Yeoheung Min clan (여흥 민씨); daughter of Min Dam (민담). ▪︎Issue: 6 sons, 2 daughters.)
  - Yi Gwang-geun (이광근), Geumji Bujeong (금지부정), 10th son (Note: ▪︎Wife: Lady, of the Hyeonpung Gwak clan (현풍 곽씨); daughter of Gwak Hang (곽항). ▪︎Issue: 1 son, 1 daughter.)
- Courtesan Eo-ri (어리) (Note: Former concubine of Gwak Seon (곽선).)
  - Lady, of the Jeonju Yi clan (전주 이씨; 1451–?), given name Ae-jung (애중), sixth daughter (Note: Married Yi Jong-gyeong (이종경).)
- Courtesan Cho-gung-jang (초궁장) (Note: She belonged to King Jeongjong.)
- Courtesan Jeong-hyang (정향)
- Courtesan Chil-jeom-saeng (칠점생) (Note: Former concubine of Princess Jeongsun's husband.)
- Unknown concubine (Note: Fomer slave.)
  - Lady, of the Jeonju Yi clan (전주 이씨), seventh daughter (Note: Married Kim Am (김암) from the Yonan Kim clan (연안 김씨).)
- Unknown concubine
  - Lady, of the Jeonju Yi clan (전주 이씨), ninth daughter (Note: Married Kim Seung-gan (김승간).)
  - Lady, of the Jeonju Yi clan (전주 이씨), 10th daughter (Note: Married Kim O (김오) from the Cheongdo Kim clan (청도 김씨).)
  - Lady, of the Jeonju Yi clan (전주 이씨), 11th daughter (Note: Married Kim Won (김원) from the Gwangsan Kim clan (광산 김씨).)
  - Lady, of the Jeonju Yi clan (전주 이씨), 12th daughter (Note: Married Han Chi-hyeong (한치형) from the Cheongju Han clan (청주 한씨); first cousin of Queen Insu. They had issue (1 daughter).)
- Unknown concubine
  - Lady, of the Jeonju Yi clan (전주 이씨), eighth daughter (Note: Married Gwon Chi-jung (권치중) from the Andong Gwon clan (안동 권씨). They had issue (at least 1 daughter); among their descendants is Sugui Gwak (숙의 곽씨; consort of Yeonsangun).)
  - Lady, of the Jeonju Yi clan (전주 이씨); ?–1489), given name Gu-ji (구지), 13th daughter
- Unknown concubine
  - Lady, of the Jeonju Yi clan (전주 이씨), 14th daughter (Note: Married Yu Seok-beon (유석번).)
  - Lady, of the Jeonju Yi clan (전주 이씨), 15th daughter (Note: Married Kim Ui (김의) from the Yonan Kim clan (연안 김씨).)
  - Lady, of the Jeonju Yi clan (전주 이씨), 16th daughter (Note: Married Im Jung (임중) from the Buan Im clan (부안 임씨).)
  - Lady, of the Jeonju Yi clan (전주 이씨), given name Geon-yi (건이), 17th daughter

== Ancestry ==
Ancestors of Grand Prince Yangnyŏng

Yi Chun, King Dojo (도조대왕 이춘)
Yi Ja-chun, King Hwanjo (환조대왕 이자춘)
Queen Gyeongsun, of the Munju Park clan (경순왕후 문주 박씨)
King Taejo (태조대왕)
Choe Han-gi, Internal Prince Yongheung (영흥부원군 최한기)
Queen Uihye, of the Yeongheung Choe clan (의혜왕후 영흥 최씨)
Grand Princess Consort of Joseon State, of the Yi clan (조선국대부인 이씨)
King Taejong (태종대왕)
Han Gyu-in (한규인)
Han Gyeong, Internal Prince Ancheon (안천부원군 한경)
Queen Sinui, of the Cheongju Han clan (신의왕후 청주 한씨)
Shin Yun-ryeo (신윤려)
Grand Princess Consort of Samhan State, of the Saknyeong Shin clan (삼한국대부인 삭녕 신씨)
Grand Prince Yangnyŏng
Min Jeok (민적)
Min Byeon (민변)
Lady, of the Wonju Won clan (원주 원씨)
Min Che, Internal Prince Yeoheung (여흥부원군 민제)
Heo Baek (허백)
Lady, of the Yangcheon Heo clan (양천 허씨)
Queen Wongyeong, of the Yeoheung Min clan (원경왕후 여흥 민씨)
Song Seon (송선)
Grand Princess Consort of Samhan State, of the Yeosan Song clan (삼한국대부인 여산 송씨)
Lady, of the Dalseong Ha clan (달성 하씨)

== In popular culture ==
- Portrayed by Song Ki-yoon in the 1983 MBC TV series The King of Chudong Palace.
- Portrayed by Lee Min-woo in the 1996–1998 KBS1 TV series Tears of the Dragon.
- Portrayed by Park Sang-min, Jung Chan-woo and Lee In in the 2008 KBS2 TV series The Great King, Sejong.
- Portrayed by Park Woong in the 2011 JTBC TV series Insu, the Queen Mother.
- Portrayed by Baek Do-bin in the 2012 film I Am the King.
- Portrayed by Lee Byung-wook in the 2016 KBS1 TV series Jang Yeong-sil.
- Portrayed by Lee Tae-ri, Kim Joon-ui and Kim In-woo in the 2021–2022 KBS1 TV series The King of Tears, Lee Bang-won.

== See also ==
- History of Korea
- Society of Joseon

== Sources ==
- Kim Haboush, JaHyun and Martina Deuchler (1999). Culture and the State in Late Chosŏn Korea. Cambridge: Harvard University Press. ISBN 9780674179820; OCLC 40926015
- Lee, Peter H. (1993). Sourcebook of Korean Civilization, Vol. 1. New York: Columbia University Press. ISBN 9780231079129; ISBN 9780231079143; ISBN 9780231104449; OCLC 26353271
- Lee Bae-yong (2008). Women in Korean History. Seoul: Ewha Womans University Press. ISBN 9788973007721
