= Changgyeonggung =

Palace in Seoul, South Korea

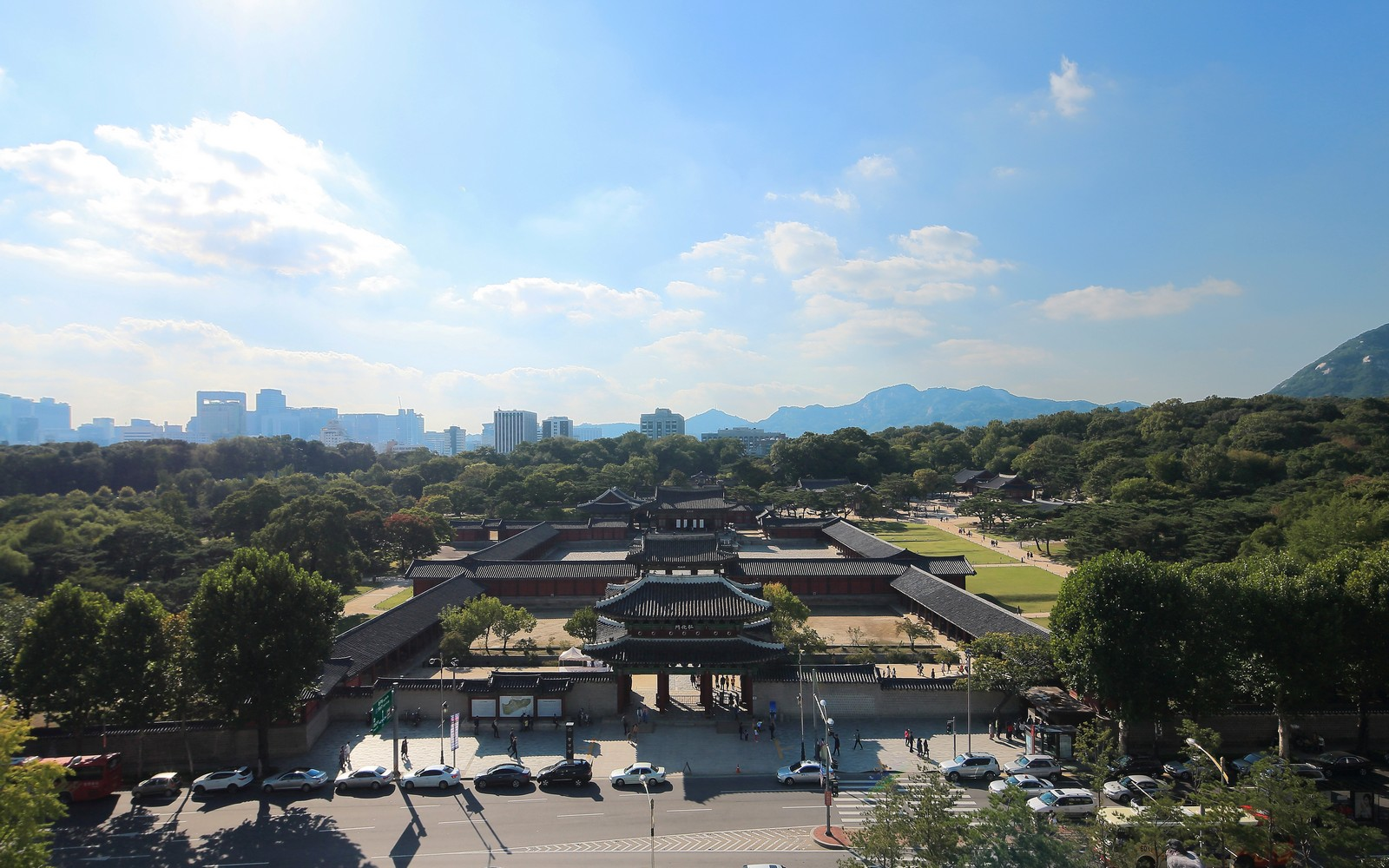
- View of the palace in 2014
- Interactive map of the Changgyeonggung area

General information
- Location: Jongno District, Seoul, South Korea
- Coordinates: 37.57843°N 126.99598°E

Design and construction
- Designations

Historic Sites of South Korea
- Official name: Changgyeonggung Palace
- Designated: 1963-01-18
- Reference no.: 123

Website
- royal.cha.go.kr/ENG/main/index.do

Korean name
- Hangul: 창경궁
- Hanja: 昌慶宮
- RR: Changgyeonggung
- MR: Ch'anggyŏnggung

Changgyeonggung (Korean: 창경궁; Hanja: 昌慶宮) is a palace located in Seoul, South Korea.

The palace was built in the mid-15th century by King Sejong for his father, Taejong. It was originally named "Suganggung", but it was renovated and enlarged in 1483 by King Seongjong, at which time it received its current name. Many structures were destroyed during the Imjin War, Japan's late 15th to 16th (1592) century attempts to conquer Korea and invade China. It was rebuilt by successive Joseon Kings but was once again largely destroyed by the Japanese in the early 20th century. This time, it was torn down methodically to make room for a modern park, a showplace for the empire, akin to Tokyo's Ueno Park.

During the Japanese colonial period, the Japanese built a zoo, botanical garden, and museum on the site. It was called "Changgyeongwon park", the "won" standing for the Korean word 'garden'. After independence in 1945 and the turmoil and destruction of the 1950-53 Korean War, the zoo was restocked through donations of wealthy Koreans as well as gifts from foreign zoos. In 1983, the zoo and botanical garden were relocated to present-day Seoul Grand Park.

== Composition and buildings ==
Today its main points of interest are as follows:

- Honghwamun (홍화문; 弘化門)

Honghwamun is the palace's main gate and faces eastward like the central part of the palace. First built in 1484, it burned down during the Japanese invasion of 1592 and was rebuilt in 1616. A ball pavilion (skipjack) was built on either side of this two-tiered wooden gate. As you pass through the gate, Okcheongjo Bridge comes into view. Between the arches under the bridge's parapet are carved goblins (dokkaebi) that are intended to ward off evil spirits. Okcheongjo Bridge was built approximately 500 years ago and serves as a symbolic entry to the courtyard.
At this gate the king met the citizens: King Yeongjo (1694–1774, r. 1726–1774) collected public opinion here in 1750 when enacting Gyunyeok Act (Equalized Tax Act); Here, King Jeongjo (1752–1800, r. 1776–1800) handed out rice to the poor in 1795.
Honghwamun was designated as South Korean National Treasure 384 on 12 January 1963.

Honghwamun gate

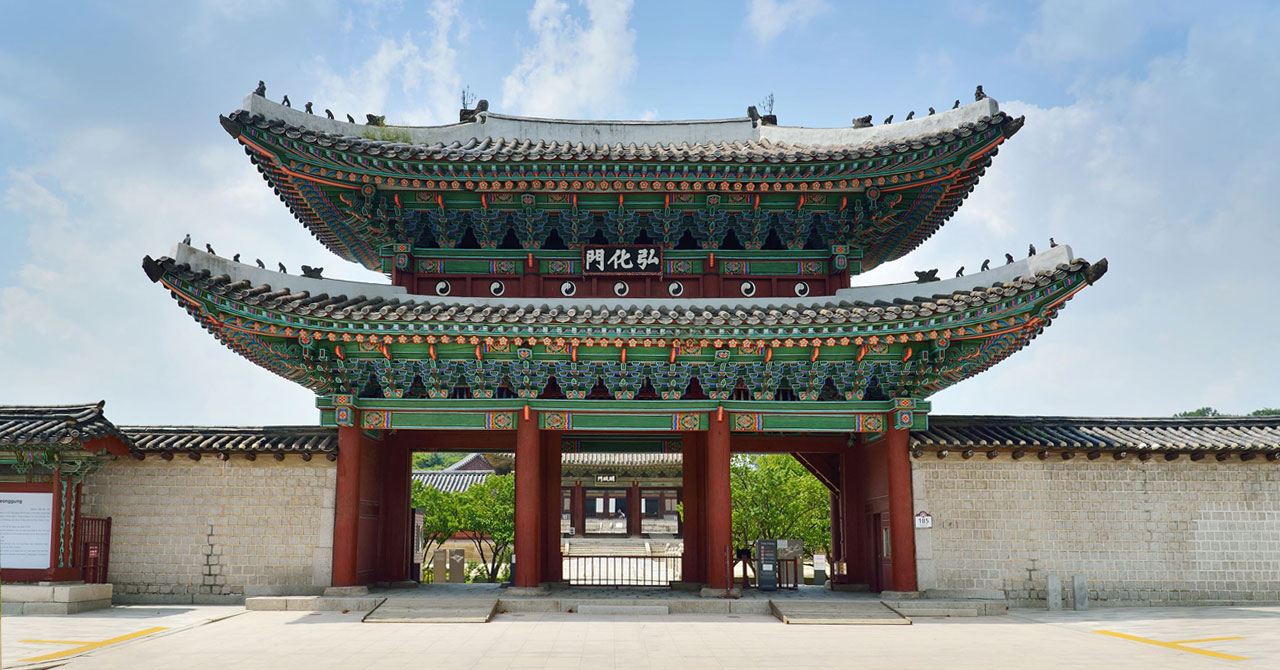
Honghwamun gate

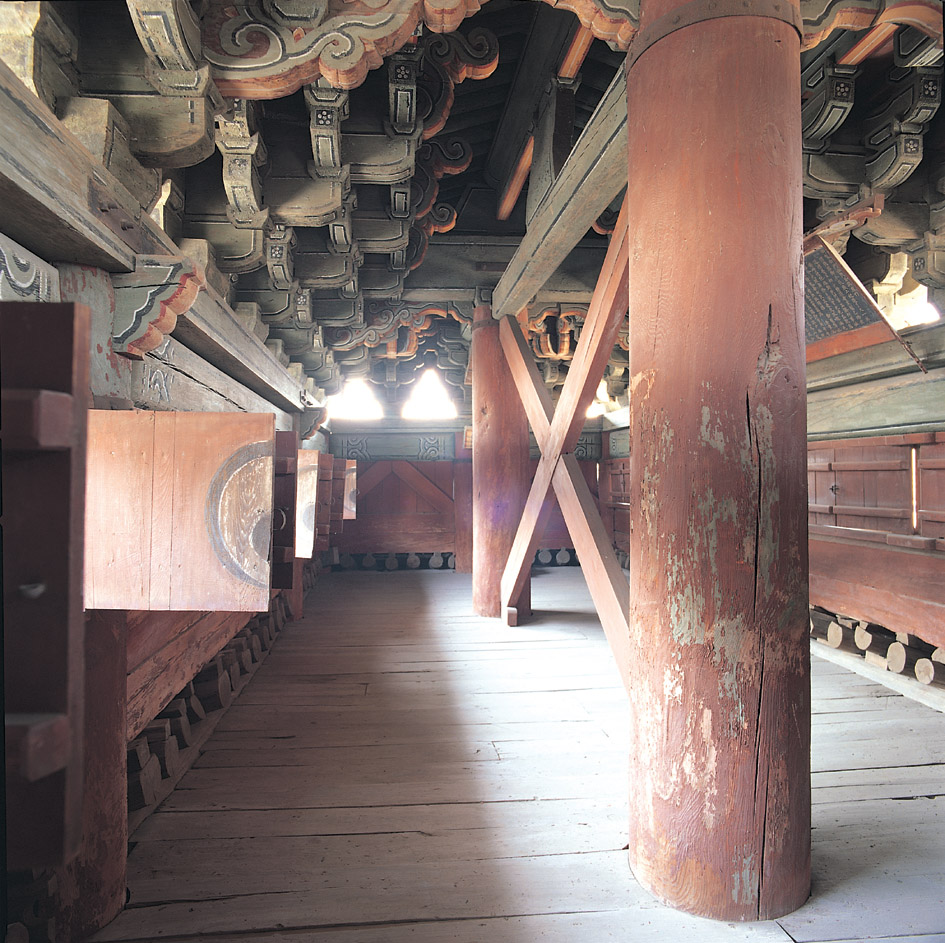

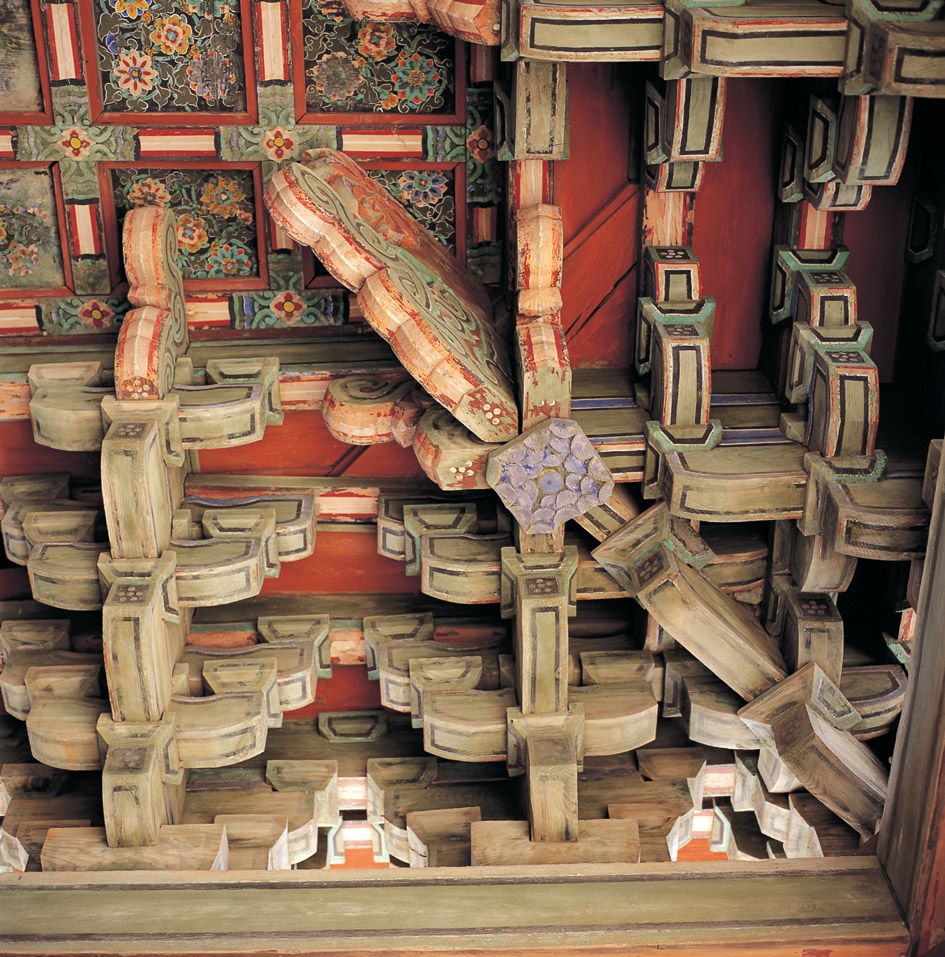
- Okcheongyo (옥천교; 玉川橋)

The Okcheongyo Bridge was built in 1483. It is 9.9 meters long by 6.6 meters wide and supported by twin arches. Between the arches under the bridge's parapet are carved goblins (dokkaebi) that are intended to ward off evil spirits. Okcheongjo Bridge serves as a symbolic entry to the courtyard. Okcheongyo Bridge was designated as National Treasure 386 on January 21, 1863.

Okcheongyo Bridge

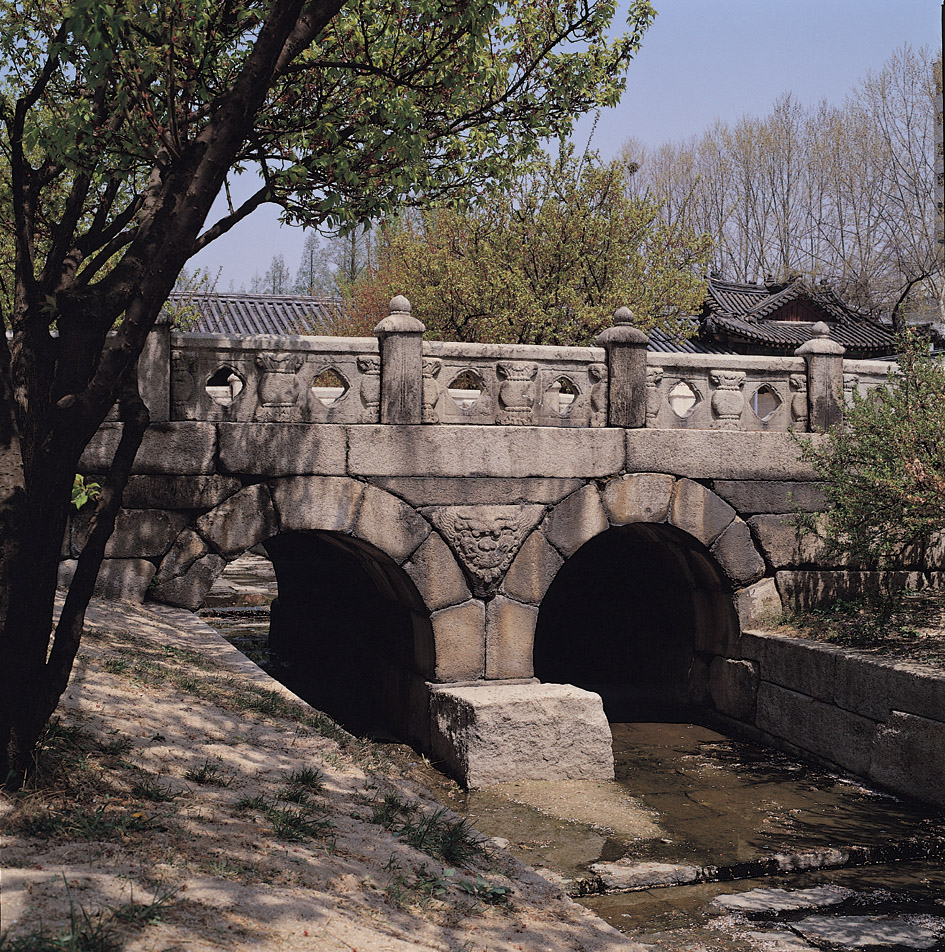

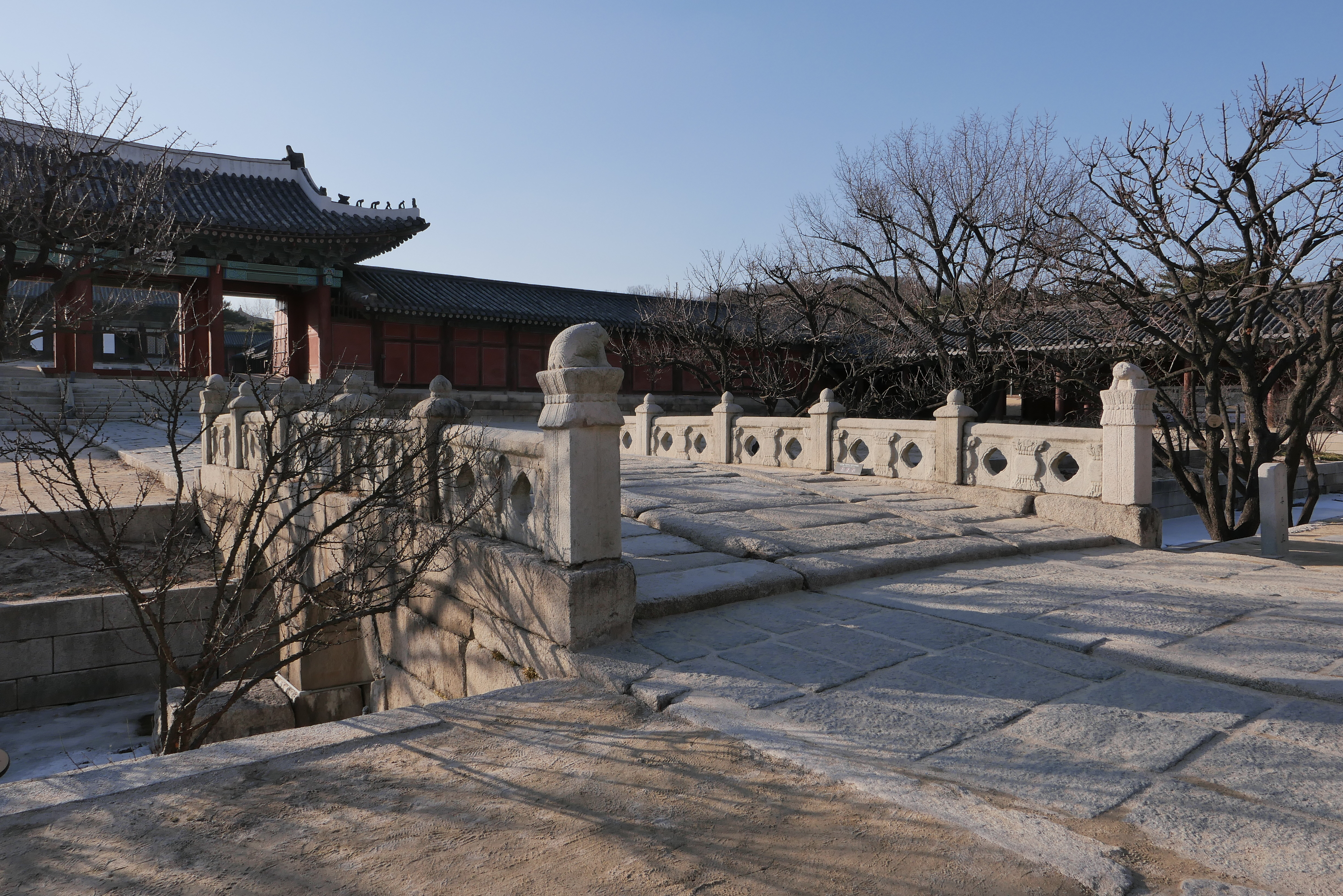

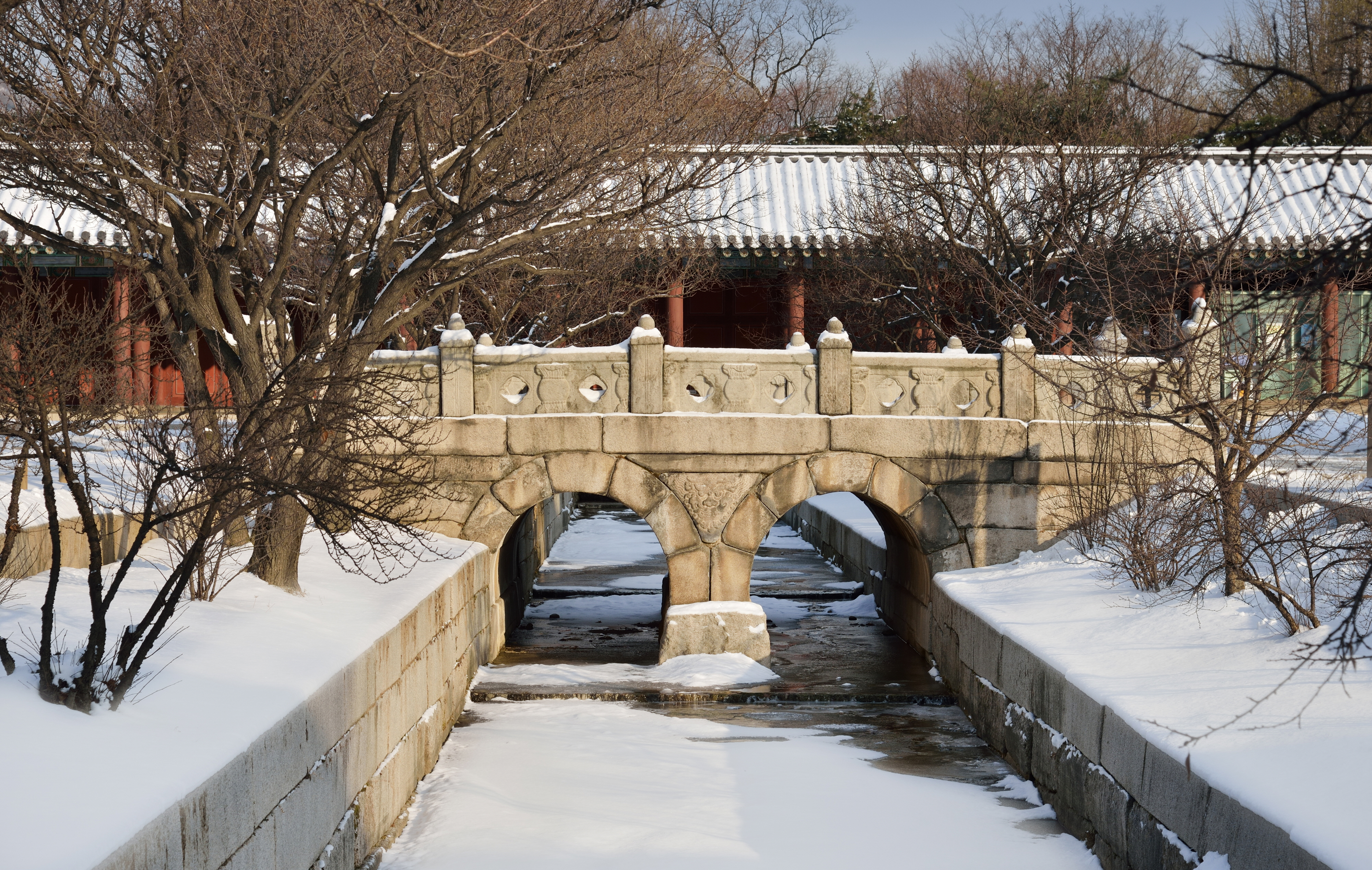
- Myeongjeongjeon (명정전; 明政殿)

Myeongjeongjeon is the palace's main hall, where state affairs such as meetings with officials and royal banquets were held. First built in 1484, it was burned down during the Japanese invasion of 1592. Rebuilt in 1616, it is the oldest main hall of all the palaces in Seoul. It is smaller than the two-story main halls of Gyeongbokgung and Changdeokgung because it was originally built as the queen's living quarters, rather than as a throne hall. Although it is a simple, one-story structure, Myeongjeongjeon was built on an elevated stone yard that imbued it with the dignity of the main hall. Running through the courtyard in front is a three-level walkway whose centre path was for the king's use only. Surrounding the entire area is a wall-like structure of single-room units which were used by the royal guards or for royal funerals. Myeongjeongjeon is designated as National Treasure 226.

Myeongjeongjeon

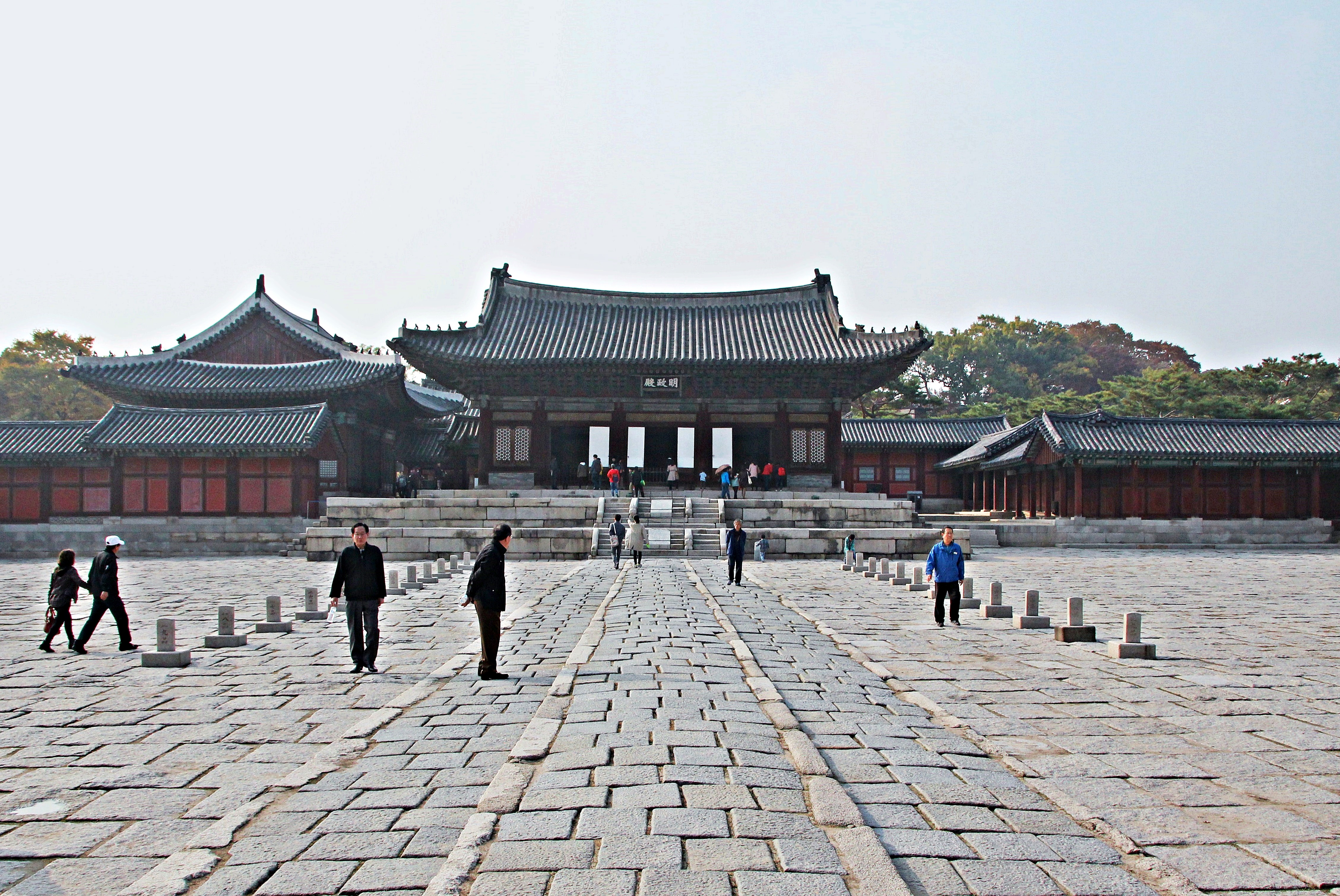

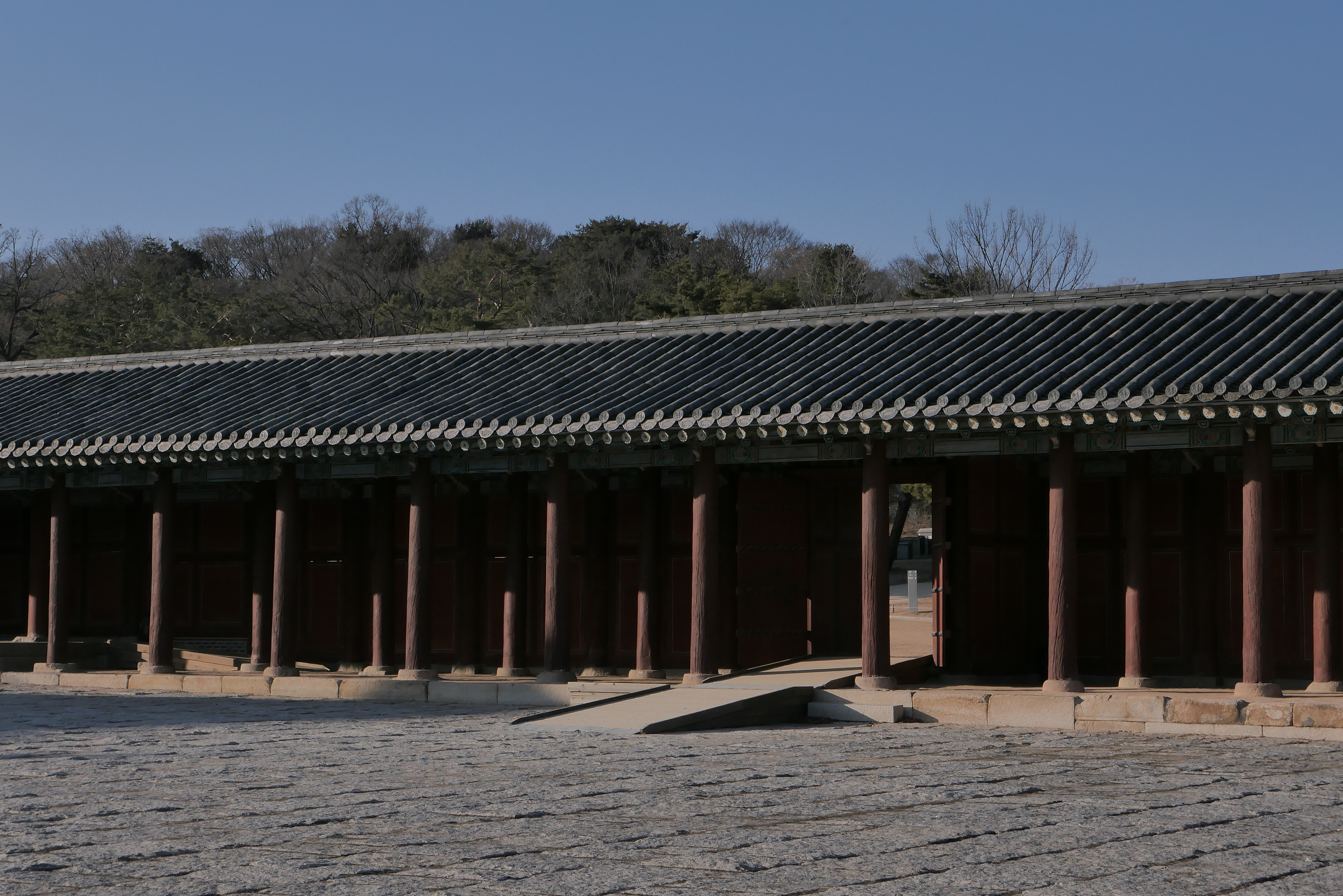
- Munjeongjeon (문정전; 文政殿)

Munjeongjeon is a council hall where the king dealt with routine state affairs. Unlike the throne hall, which faces east, this building faces south. Such a palace layout with a secondary structure facing a different direction than a throne hall is highly unusual in Korea. Munjeongjeon was also used to enshrine royal tablets after funerals. It was dismantled during the Japanese occupation. Munjeongjeon as it stands today was restored in 1986 along with Munjeongjeon Gate and the eastern part of the roofed corridor. According to the nineteenth-century "Painting of the Eastern Palace", Munjeongjeon was partitioned from Sungmundang and Myeongjeongjeon by a wall, and had a small annexe; the courtyard was surrounded by a wall-like corridor. This part has not yet been restored.
Built in 1483, destroyed in 1592, rebuilt in 1616, burnt down in 1830 and again rebuilt in 1834. King Jeongjo and King Heonjong were born here.
First built in 1484 during the reign of King Seongjong, destroyed in 1592, rebuilt in 1616, burnt down in 1830 and again rebuilt in 1834.
Originally named "Sunyeongjeon", it was first built in 1484, rebuilt most recently in 1834; main building in the Yeonjo area where kings and their families lived.
Constructed in 1909 during the reign of Emperor Sunjong, with 366-square-meter island and bridge added in 1984. The smaller pond is 1,107 square meters and the larger one is 6,483 square meters.

On May 13, 1762, that courtyard in front of Munjeongjeon witnessed the most tragic incident of the century. It had been reported to King Yeongjo that Crown Prince Sado was mentally ill and behaving erratically. Furious with the Prince, his father ordered him to be sealed alive in a large rice chest, where he died eight days later at the age of 27. King Yeongjo later became remorseful and gave his son the posthumous title 'Sado' ("thinking in sorrow"). It is often believed that Crown Prince Sado was a victim of a conspiracy by his political adversaries, but this is rebutted in the Memoirs of Lady Hyegyŏng, which was written by Prince Sado's wife Lady Hyegyŏng.

== Gallery ==
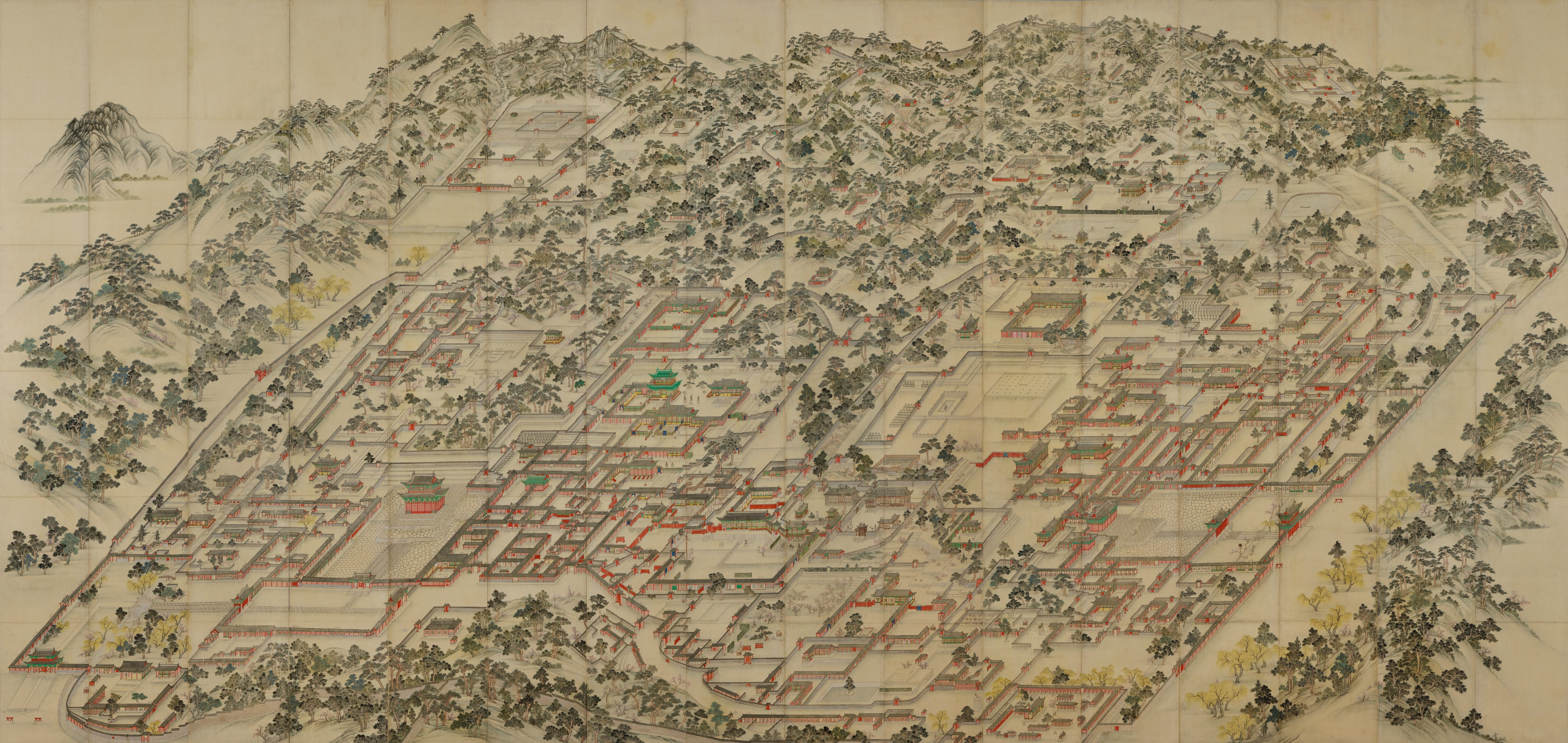
Changgyeonggung (right) in the early 19th century

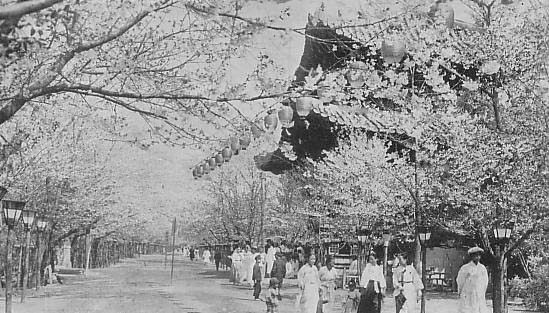
Changgyeonggung in 1930

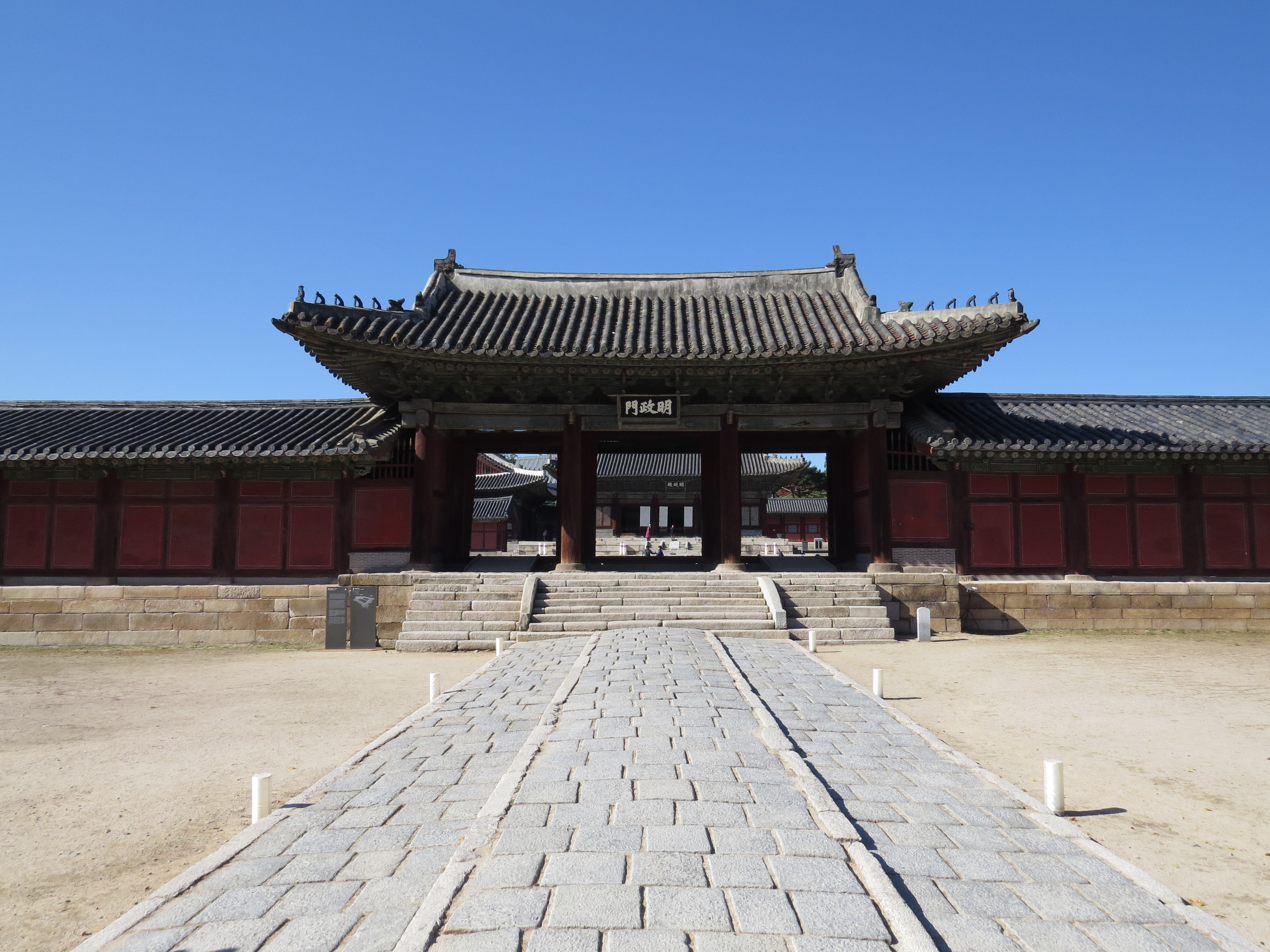
Myeongjeongmun, the entrance to the main hall of the palace

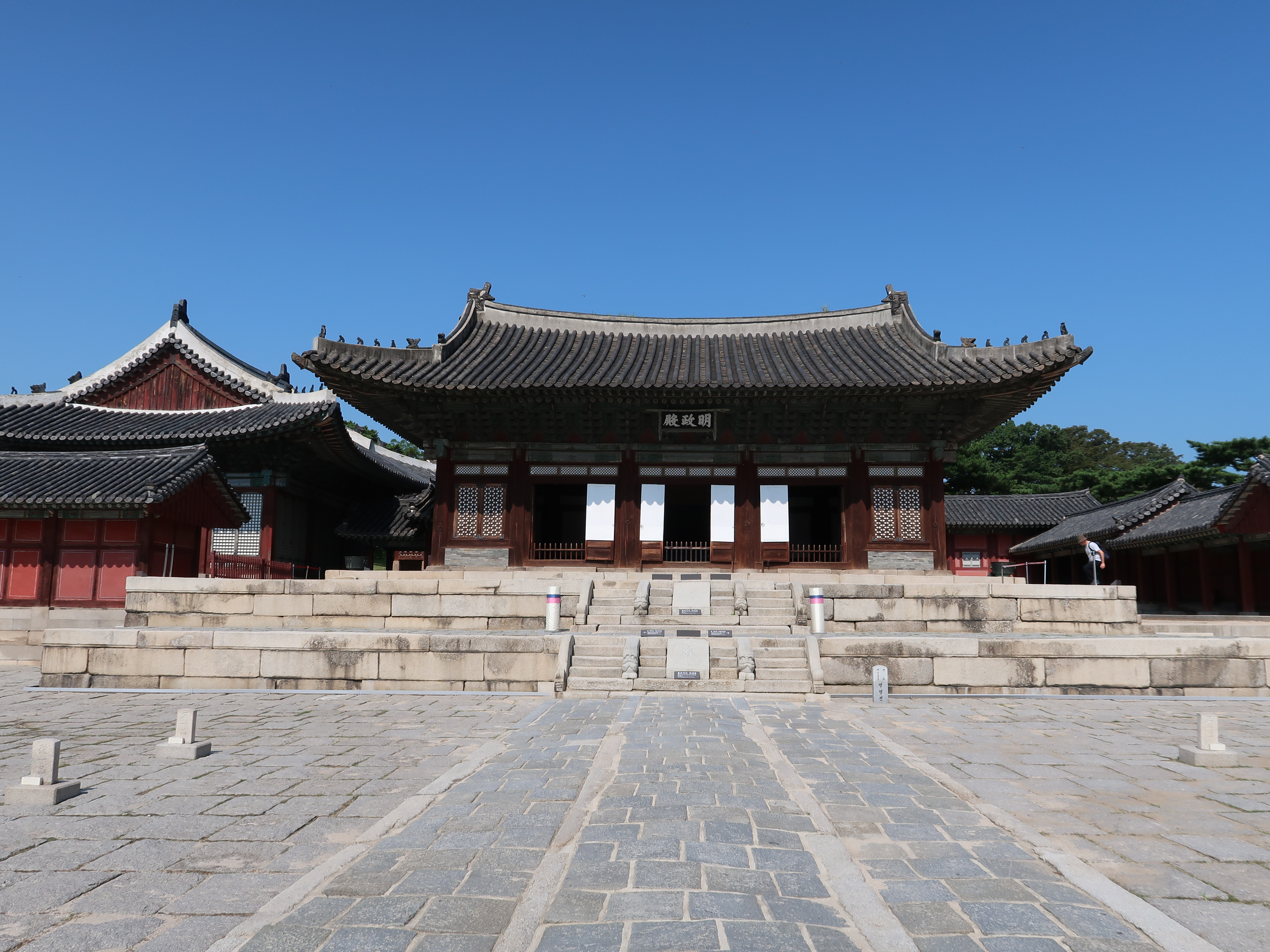
Myeongjeongjeon, the main hall of the palace

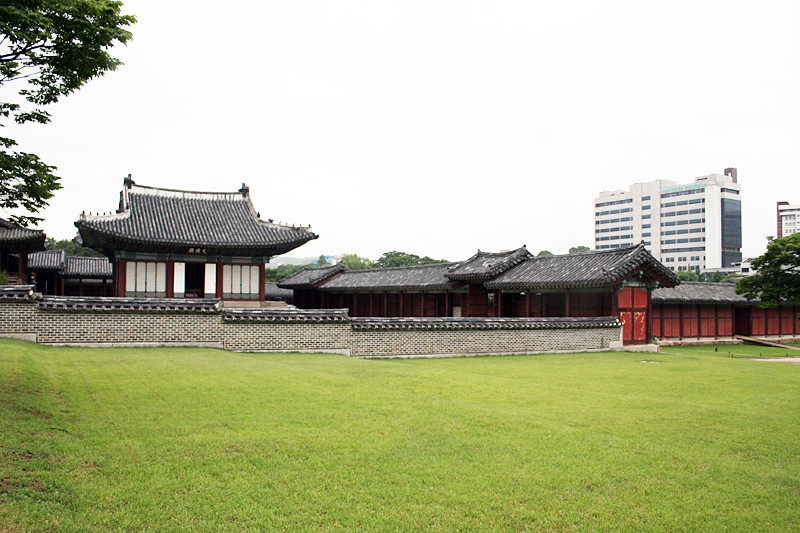
A side view of the palace's backyard with Munjeongjeon in the background

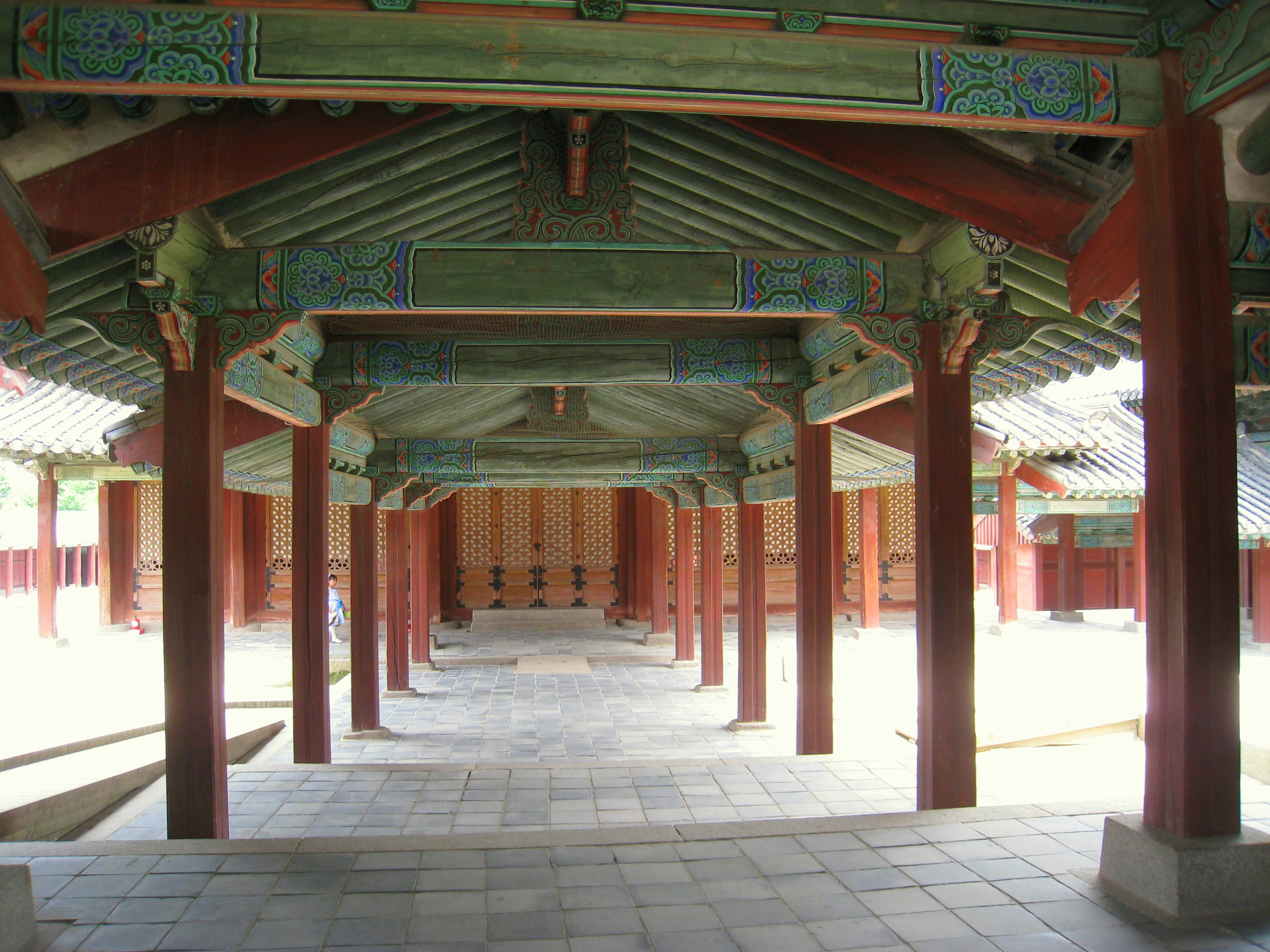
Sungmundang corridor

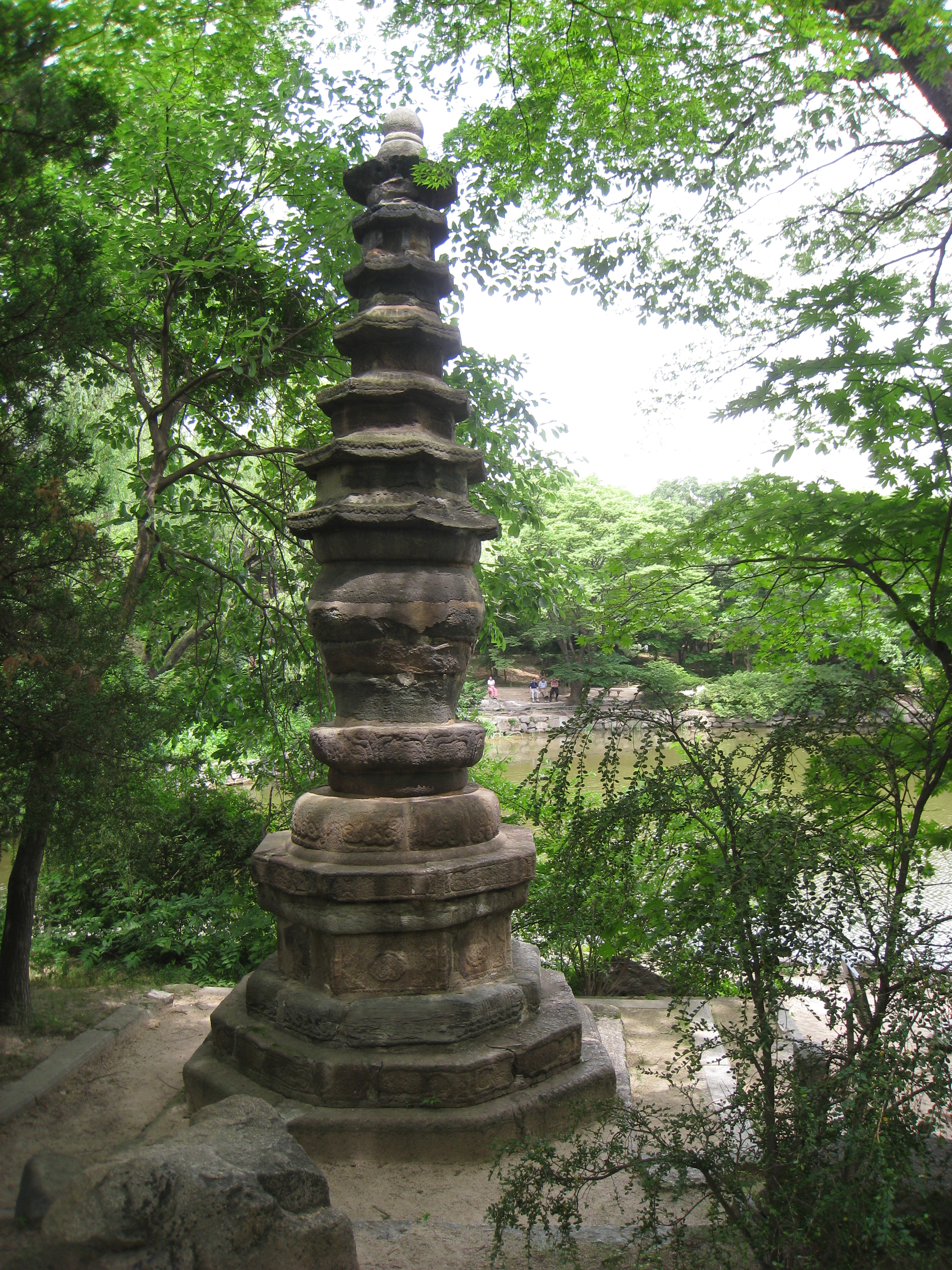
Pagoda

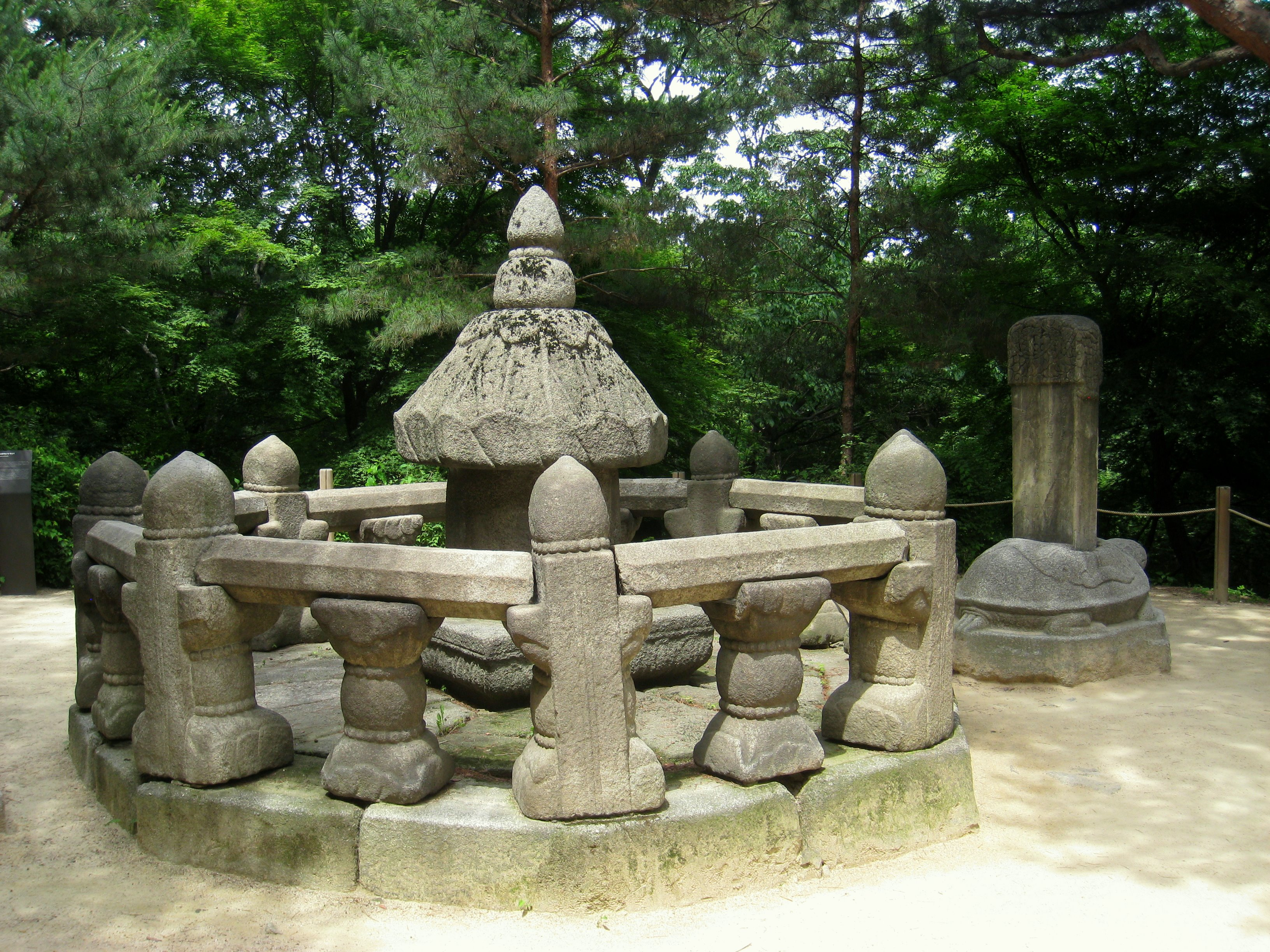
Taesil

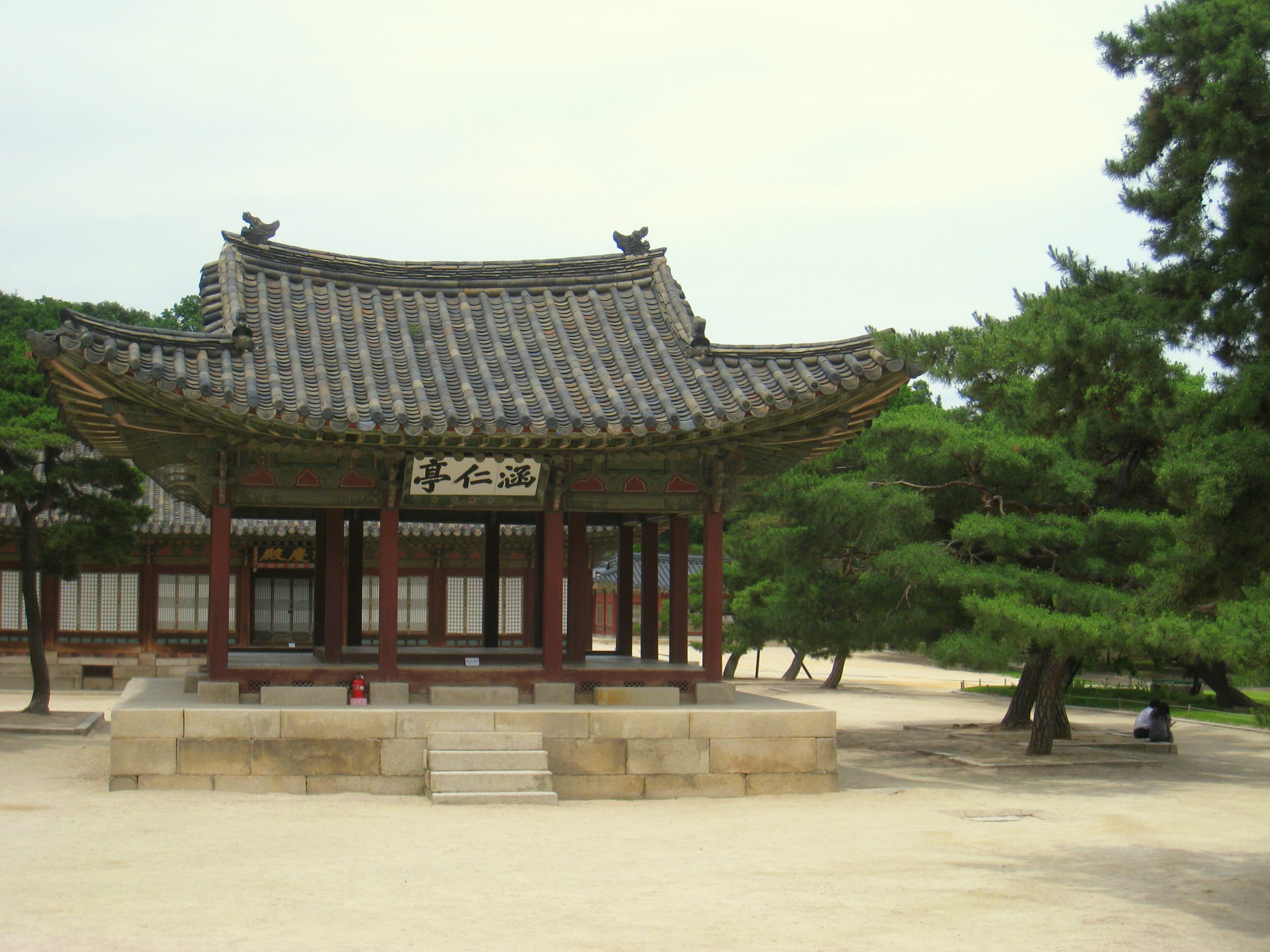
Haminjeong

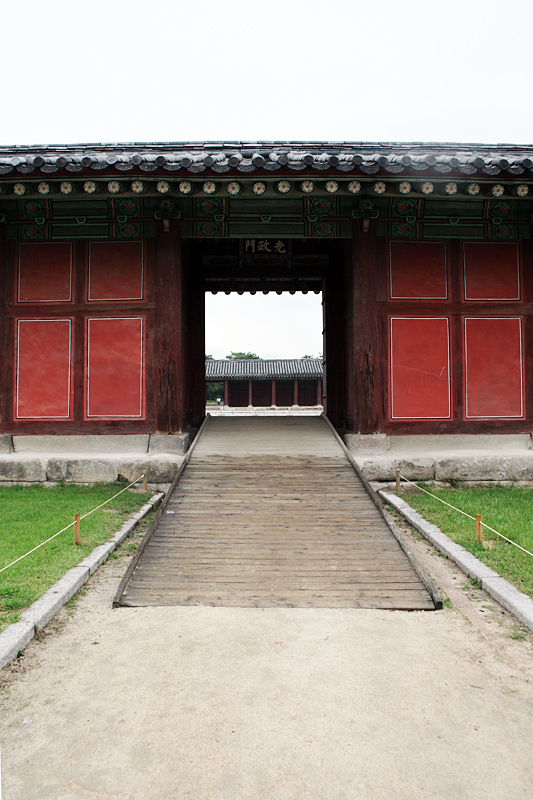
Gwangjeongmun Gate

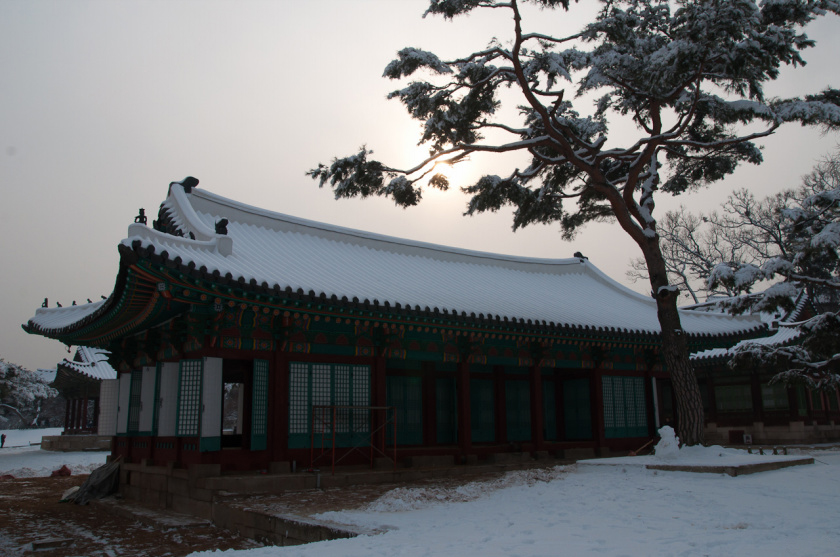
Yanghwagung in Winter

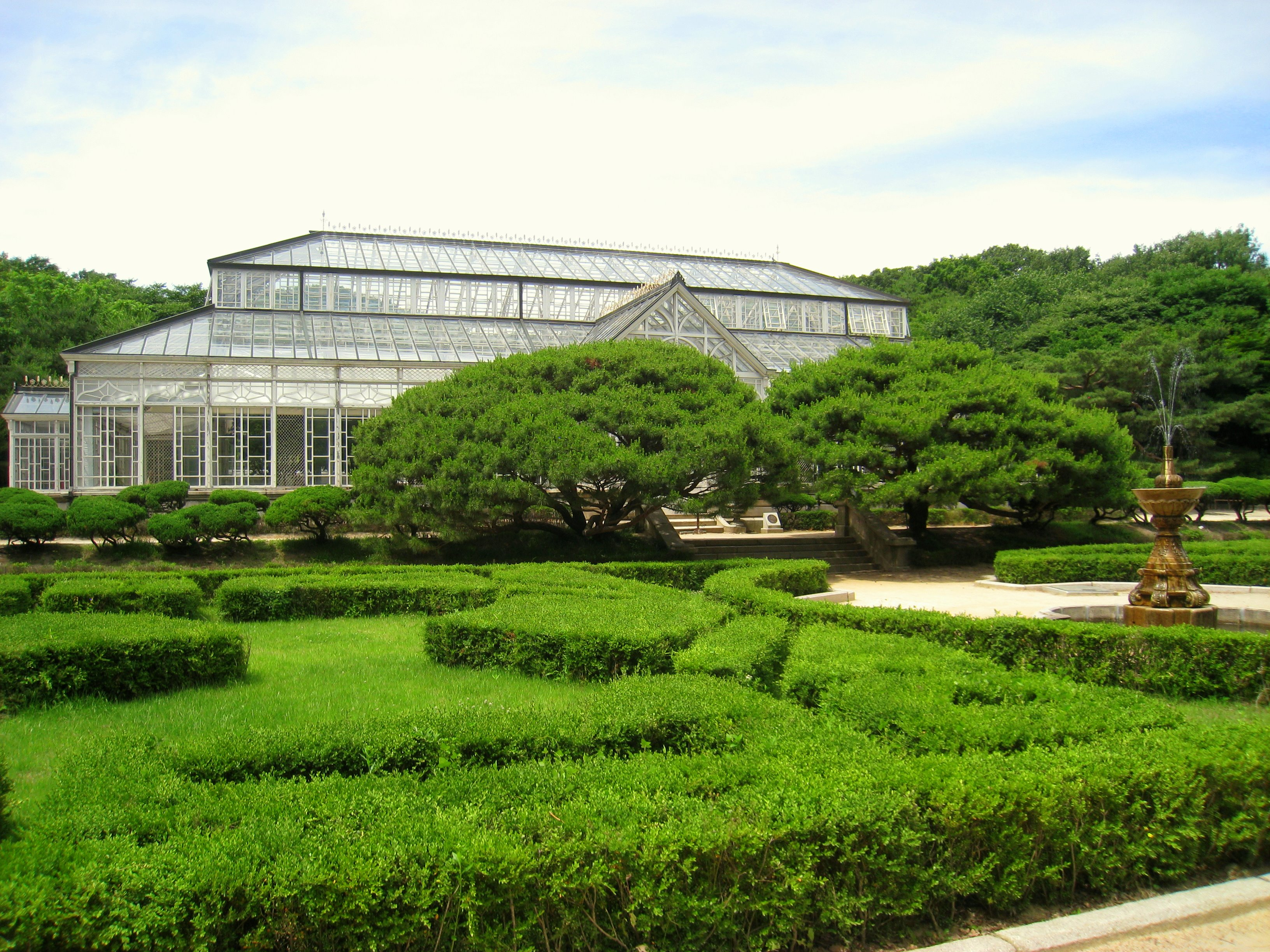
Daeonsil, the greenhouse of Changgyeonggung

== See also ==
- Changdeokgung

== Bibliography ==
- Hoon, Shin Young (2008). The Royal Palaces of Korea: Six Centuries of Dynastic Grandeur (Hardback). Singapore: Stallion Press. ISBN 978-981-08-0806-8.
