= Lee In (actor) =

South Korean actor (born 1984)

- Born: June 14, 1984 (age 42); Daejeon, South Chungcheong Province, South Korea
- Other name: Lee Joon
- Education: Chung-Ang University - Theater and Film
- Occupation: Actor
- Years active: 1998–present
- Agent: L.B Entertainment

Korean name
- Hangul: 이인
- RR: I In
- MR: I In

Lee In (Korean: 이인; born June 14, 1984) is a South Korean actor. He made his acting debut as a child actor in 1998 using the stage name Lee Joon (이준). He began using his real name professionally in 2008.

== Filmography ==
=== Television series ===
Year	Title	Role	Network
1995	Korea Gate	Park Ji-man	SBS
1999	The Little Prince	Jeong Yoo-seong	KBS2
1999	The King and the Queen	young Prince Wolsan	KBS1
2000	Promise	young Kim Min-jae	KBS1
2001	Empress Myeongseong	young Gojong	KBS2
2002	Sidestreet People	Yoo Sam-sik	KBS2
2002	Present	Kim Joon-hong	MBC
2003	Age of Warriors	Gangjong	KBS1
2004	Sweet 18	Ji Nam-cheol	KBS2
2004	War of the Roses	Lee Jae-dong	MBC
2004	Magic	Yoon Do-young	SBS
2004	Immortal Admiral Yi Sun-sin	Prince Gwanghae	KBS1
2004	Father of the Sea	Park Jae-dong	MBC
2005	Woman Above Flower	Yang Dong-chan	SBS
2005	Drama City "Pokhara"	Kang Hyun-tae	KBS2
2006	Freeze		Channel CGV
2006	Hwang Jini		KBS2
2007	Cannot Hate You	Yang Dong-woo	SBS
2008	The Great King, Sejong	young Prince Yangnyeong	KBS1/KBS2
2008	Painter of the Wind	Shin Young-bok	SBS
2009	Empress Cheonchu	King Mokjong	KBS2
2009	Splendor of Youth	Kim Joo-hyung	KBS1
2010	The Slave Hunters	Grand Prince Bongrim	KBS2
2010	Sungkyunkwan Scandal	Park Dal-jae	KBS2
2010	Drama Special "Stone"	Kwon Jae-ho	KBS2
2010	The King of Legend	Ajikai	KBS1
2013	Eunhui	Im Sung-jae	KBS2
2016	I'm Sorry, But I Love You	Park Do-hun / Shin Min-joon	SBS

=== Film ===
Year	Title	Role
1998	Spring in My Hometown	Sung-min
1999	The Harmonium in My Memory	Soon-cheol
2002	Break Out	
2004	Father and Son: The Story of Mencius	Maeng Sa-seong
2007	Muoi: The Legend of a Portrait	Ji-hoon
2008	A Secret Scandal	Hyun-woo
