= I Am the King =

- Promotional poster for I Am the King
- Hangul: 나는 왕이로소이다
- Hanja: 나는 王이로소이다
- RR: Naneun wangirosoida
- MR: Nanŭn wangirosoida
- Directed by: Jang Kyu-sung
- Written by: Hwang Seong-gu
- Based on: The Prince and the Pauper by Mark Twain
- Produced by: Kang Young-mo; Kim Won-guk; Lee Sung-jin
- Starring: Ju Ji-hoon; Park Yeong-gyu; Baek Yoon-sik; Byun Hee-bong; Kim Soo-ro; Lee Hanee
- Cinematography: Kim Dong-cheon
- Edited by: Shin Min-kyung
- Music by: Kim Jun-seok
- Production company: Daisy Entertainment
- Release date: 8 August 2012
- Running time: 120 minutes
- Country: South Korea
- Language: Korean
- Box office: US$4.4 million

I Am the King (Korean: 나는 왕이로소이다, also known as I Am a King) is a 2012 South Korean historical comedy film, starring Ju Ji-hoon, Park Yeong-gyu, Baek Yoon-sik, Byun Hee-bong, Kim Soo-ro and Lee Hanee. Inspired by Mark Twain's 1881 novel The Prince and the Pauper, the film is set in the Joseon period with Ju playing the dual role of a king and a beggar. It was released on August 8, 2012 and ran for 120 minutes.

== Background ==
The movie depicts the three months before Choong-nyung (the future Sejong the Great) becomes king. The Annals of the Joseon Dynasty, which follow the history of the Joseon period between 1413 and 1865, leave out records of this crucial period. While to future generations King Sejong would stand as a legendary figure for his creation of the Korean alphabet and advancing the country's scientific research and law, as Prince Choong-nyung he was known to be a bit of a reclusive bookworm.

== Plot ==
When his older brothers Yangnyeong and Hyoryeong fail to impress their father King Taejong, the king makes a royal command for Choong-nyung to become the next ruler of the kingdom instead. The prince, who strongly refuses to become the king and just wants to live a happy and stress-free life buried in his books, chooses to escape the palace before his coronation ceremony.

After hours of contemplation, Choong-nyung escapes by climbing over the palace wall. There he runs into a bad-tempered drunken slave named Deok-chil, who happens to be at the palace to save the love of his life who was captured by government officials and put in prison for being the daughter of a suspected spy.

Deok-chil perfectly resembles the prince, so Choong-nyung instantly grabs the chance to disguise himself as a slave and they exchange clothes with each other. In a terrible twist of fate, when Choong-nyung wakes up after being knocked unconscious, he is mistaken for a slave and Deok-chil gets put on the throne. As Choong-nyung ventures outside the palace walls, he begins to open his eyes to the people living in extreme poverty and experiences the life of the common man.

== Cast ==
- Ju Ji-hoon as Grand Prince Choong-nyung / Duk-Chil
- Baek Yoon-sik as Hwang-Hee
- Byun Hee-bong as Shin-Ik
- Park Yeong-gyu as King Taejong
- Im Won-hee as Hae-Koo
- Lee Hanee as Soo-Yeon
- Kim Soo-ro as Hwang-Koo
- Baek Do-bin as Grand Prince Yang-nyung
- Im Hyung-joon as Jang Young-shil
- Kim Eung-soo as an old butcher
- Kim So-hyun as Sol-Bi
- Han Yeo-wool as a virgin
- Lee Mi-do as the Crown Princess Consort
- Yoon Kyung-ho as Geun-Bae
- Kwon Hyuk-soo as Soo Yeon-boo
- Lee Dae-gwang as Tteok seller 1
- Lee Jung-hoon as Tteok seller 2
- Kim Wang-geun as Lee-Bang
- Yang Myung-hun as Hwang-Hee's warrior
- Jang Tae-min as a Slave
- Byun Joo-hyun as a Royal officer
- Jung-Woon as Yang-nyung's group
- Ham Jin-sung as Yang-nyung's group
- Lee Chul-hee
- Im Hak-soon

== Special screening ==
On August 13, 2012, a special screening was held at the palace Deoksugung in Seoul, the first Korean movie screened outdoors on the palace grounds. Some 500 citizens as well as independence fighters and their families were in attendance. The event marked National Liberation Day, which commemorates Korea's independence from Japanese colonial rule.

== Reception ==
The film ranked third and grossed ₩3,400,628,393 in its first week of release, and grossed a total of ₩5,037,762,632 domestically after two weeks of screening.
