= Baek Yoon-sik =

South Korean actor (born 1947)

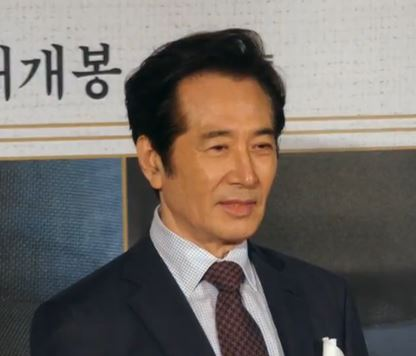
- Baek in August 2018
- Born: 16 March 1947 (age 79); Seoul, Southern Korea
- Education: Chung-Ang University (Theater and Film)
- Occupation: Actor
- Years active: 1970–present
- Agent: Fantagio
- Spouse: Unknown (m. 1977; div. 2004)
- Children: Baek Do-bin; Baek Seo-bin

Korean name
- Hangul: 백윤식
- Hanja: 白允植
- RR: Baek Yunsik
- MR: Paek Yunsik
- Website: web.archive.org/web/20120608042608/http://www.baekyoonsik.co.kr/

Baek Yoon-sik (Korean: 백윤식; born 16 March 1947) is a South Korean actor. He is known for his characteristic near-expressionless facial acting.

== Career ==
Baek Yoon-sik made his debut in 1970 on KBS TV. In the coming years he would appear in four films, taking lead roles in his acting debut Excellent Guys and in romantic comedy Only with You with Seo Mi-kyung, a young star of the time. He also obtained his bachelor's degree and master's degree in Theater and Film at Chung-Ang University.

Nonetheless, his film career appeared to end in the 1970s and he became known thereafter as a TV actor. In the late 1990s and early 2000s he attained a certain degree of visibility in TV dramas such as The Moon of Seoul (1994, with Han Suk-kyu and Choi Min-sik) and Jang Hui-bin (2002, with Kim Hye-soo).

In 2003, however, Baek's career was revived in spectacular fashion with a major role in Jang Joon-hwan's acclaimed debut feature Save the Green Planet!. Playing an arrogant company executive—believed by the film's hero to be an alien from the Andromeda Galaxy—Baek's performance won him a Best Actor Award from the 2003 Puchon International Fantastic Film Festival, as well as numerous best supporting actor mentions from local awards ceremonies. He quickly became sort of a cult figure among younger cinephiles.

Following on this success, Baek went on to appear in several more high-profile films, including a memorable role in Choi Dong-hoon's caper film The Big Swindle and a showstopping performance as intelligence chief Kim Jae-gyu in Im Sang-soo's controversial drama The President's Last Bang.

The year 2006 turned out to be a particularly prolific year for Baek, as he took leading and supporting roles in four films. (It was a profitable year as well, with his fee rising to $400,000 per film—just a shade below that of the top stars.) Of these four, Choi Dong-hoon's Tazza: The High Rollers proved to be a runaway hit, selling close to 7 million tickets.

In August 2021, Baek signed with new agency Fantagio.

== Personal life ==
Baek divorced his wife in March 2004 after 27 years of marriage. His two sons, Baek Do-bin and Baek Seo-bin, are also actors.

== Filmography ==
=== Film ===
Year	Title	Role
1974	Excellent Guys	
1976	Only with You	
1976	A Woman's Castle	
1977	Chu-ha, My Love	
2000	A Masterpiece in My Life	Boss Yang
2003	Save the Green Planet!	Kang Man-shik
2004	The Big Swindle	Mr. Kim
2005	The President's Last Bang	Kim Jae-gyu
2006	The Art of Fighting	Oh Pan-su
2006	Like a Virgin	Ssireum coach
2006	Tazza: The High Rollers	Mr. Pyeong
2006	How the Lack of Love Affects Two Men	Dong Chol-dong
2007	Surf's Up	Big Z (voice, Korean dubbed)
2007	Bravo My Life	Cho Min-hyuk
2007	The Bank Attack	Detective squad captain Gu
2009	Jeon Woo-chi: The Taoist Wizard	Master (cameo)
2011	Meet the In-Laws	Young-kwang
2011	Head	Baek Jeong
2011	Champ	President of horse riding association
2012	The Taste of Money	Chairman Yoon
2012	I Am the King	Hwang Hui
2013	The Face Reader	Kim Jongseo
2015	Inside Men	Lee Kang-hee
2016	The Last Princess	Emperor Gojong
2017	The Chase	Shim Deok-su
2018	Feng Shui	Kim Jwa-gun
2023	Noryang: Deadly Sea	Shimazu

=== Television series ===
Year	Title	Role
1970	Hometown of Legends	
1970	River	
1970	Arirang	Na Woon-gyu
1974	Land	
1978	Establishment of Government	
1979	The Solitude of Eun Ji-hwa	Lee Jung-seob
1979	Water Pattern	
1980	Hope	
1981	Daemyeong	Crown Prince Sohyeon
1983	Naughty Chorus	
1984	Independence Gate	Yun Chi-ho
1984	TV Tale of Chunhyang	Byeon Hak-do
1984	Video Drama	Lee Sang-hwa
1986	Southern Cross	South Korean student
1988	Punggaek	
1989	The Forest Never Sleeps	
1990	In Search of Fog	
1991	Numb Fingertips	Principal Moon Joong-hoon
1991	School of Love	
1991	Kyoto 25 City	
1993	The Beginning of Any Day	
1993	3rd Republic	Kim Dae-jung
1994	Han Myung-hoi	Seong Sam-mun
1994	The Moon of Seoul	Art teacher Kim In-cheol
1995	Jang Nok-su	Grand Prince Je-ahn
1995	War and Love	Hang-so
1996	The Brothers' River	Dr. Choi
1996	Hometown of Legends – "Deokdaegol"	Terminally ill husband
1997	Hometown of Legend – "Sashin's Smile"	
1997	A Bluebird Has It	Director Baek
1998	Until the Azalea Blooms	Baek Woon-soo
2000	She's the One	
2000	Virtue	Jang Cheon-il
2001	Ladies of the Palace	Jeong Yun-gyeom
2002	Jang Hui-bin	Jo Sa-seok
2003	Apgujeong House	Father
2009	Hero	Jo Yong-deok
2010	Golden House	Park Tae-chon
2011	Deep Rooted Tree	King Taejong
2012	Immortal Classic	Hwang Young-chul
2013	Hur Jun, The Original Story	Yoo Ui-tae
2014	Naeil's Cantabile	Franz von Stresemann
2019	Vagabond	Jung Kook-pyo
2024	Family Matters	Baek Kang-sung

== Awards and nominations ==
Year	Award	Category	Nominated work	Result
2003	7th Puchon International Fantastic Film Festival	Best Actor	Save the Green Planet!	Won
2003	40th Grand Bell Awards	Best Supporting Actor	Save the Green Planet!	Won
2003	24th Blue Dragon Film Awards	Best Supporting Actor	Save the Green Planet!	Won
2003	2nd Korean Film Awards	Best Supporting Actor	Save the Green Planet!	Won
2004	5th Busan Film Critics Awards	Best Supporting Actor	The Big Swindle	Won
2004	25th Blue Dragon Film Awards	Best Supporting Actor	The Big Swindle	Nominated
2004	3rd Korean Film Awards	Best Actor	The Big Swindle	Nominated
2004	Cine21 Awards	Best Actor	The Big Swindle	Won
2004	SBS Drama Awards	Excellence Award, Actor in a Sitcom	Apgujeong House	Won
2005	41st Baeksang Arts Awards	Best Actor (Film)	The President's Last Bang	Nominated
2013	50th Grand Bell Awards	Best Supporting Actor	The Face Reader	Nominated
2013	MBC Drama Awards	Golden Acting Award, Actor	Hur Jun, the Original Story	Nominated
2016	52nd Baeksang Arts Awards	Best Actor (Film)	Inside Men	Nominated
2016	11th Max Movie Awards	Best Supporting Actor	Inside Men	Nominated
2016	21st Chunsa Film Art Awards	Best Supporting Actor	Inside Men	Nominated
2019	SBS Drama Awards	Best Supporting Actor	Vagabond	Nominated
