= Taejong of Joseon =

King of Joseon from 1400 to 1418

Taejong

Grand King Emeritus of Joseon
- Tenure: 17 October 1421 – 8 June 1422
- Predecessor: Taejo
- Successor: None

King Emeritus of Joseon
- Tenure: 18 September 1418 – 17 October 1421
- Predecessor: Jeongjong
- Successor: Danjong

King of Joseon
- Reign: 7 December 1400 – 18 September 1418
- Enthronement: Main Hall, Suchanggung (Note: Korean: 수창궁; Hanja: 壽昌宮; located in present-day Kaesong, it was the principal palace of Goryeo.)
- Predecessor: Jeongjong
- Successor: Sejong

Crown Prince of Joseon
- Tenure: 8 March – 7 December 1400
- Predecessor: Crown Prince Panggwa
- Successor: Crown Prince Che
- Born: 21 June 1367; Hamhung Royal Villa, Dongbuk-myeon, Goryeo
- Died: 8 June 1422 (aged 54); Suganggung, Hansŏng, Joseon
- Burial: Heolleung, Seoul, South Korea
- Spouse: Queen Wŏn'gyŏng (m. 1382; died 1420)
- Issue Detail: Princess Chŏngsun; Grand Prince Yangnyŏng; Grand Prince Hyoryŏng; Prince Gyeongnyeong; Sejong of Joseon
Names
- Yi Pangwŏn (이방원; 李芳遠)
Era dates
- Adopted the era name of the Ming dynasty (Note: Geonmun (Jianwen): (건문; 建文): 1400–1402 Hongmu (Hongwu) (홍무; 洪武): 1402 Yeongnak (Yongle) (영락; 永樂): 1403–1418)
Regnal name
- Kŏnch'ŏn Ch'egŭk Taejŏng Kyeu Yech'ŏl Sŏngryŏl (건천체극대정계우예철성렬; 建天體極大正啓佑睿哲成烈) (Note: Known as honorific name (존호; 尊號) in the Sinosphere, its closest equivalent in the English-speaking world is the regnal name.)
Posthumous name
- Joseon: Great King Gongjeong Seondeok Singong Munmu Gwanghyo (공정성덕신공문무광효대왕; 恭定聖德神功文武光孝大王); Ming dynasty: Gongjeong (공정; 恭定)
Temple name
- Taejong (태종; 太宗)
- Clan: Jeonju Yi
- Dynasty: Yi
- Father: King Taejo
- Mother: Queen Sinŭi
- Religion: Confucianism (Neo-Confucianism)
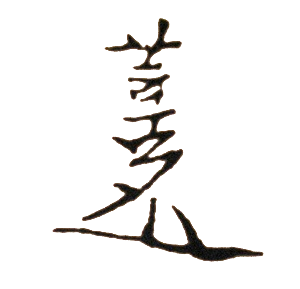
- Signature

Korean name
- Hangul: 태종
- Hanja: 太宗
- Lit.: "Great Ancestor"
- RR: Taejong
- MR: T'aejong

Royal title
- Hangul: 정안군
- Hanja: 靖安君
- RR: Jeongangun
- MR: Chŏngan'gun

Courtesy name
- Hangul: 유덕
- Hanja: 遺德
- RR: Yudeok
- MR: Yudŏk

Taejong (Korean: 태종; Hanja: 太宗; 21 June 1367 – 8 June 1422), (Note: In the Korean calendar (lunisolar), he was born on the 16th day of the 5th lunar month and died on the 10th day of the 5th lunar month.) personal name Yi Pangwŏn, was the third monarch of Joseon and the father of Sejong the Great. The fifth son of King Taejo, the founder of the dynasty, he was himself a major contributor to the establishment of the new regime. He acceded to the throne upon the abdication of his elder brother, King Jeongjong.

== Biography ==
=== Early life and founding of Joseon ===
Born in 1367 as the fifth son of the future King Taejo and his first wife, Lady Han (posthumously Queen Sinŭi), Yi Pangwŏn qualified as an official in 1382. He studied under Confucian scholars such as Wŏn Ch'ŏnsŏk. During his early years, he assisted his father in gathering the support of the commoners and of many influential figures in the government. He also helped in the founding of Joseon by assassinating powerful officials who remained loyal to Goryeo, most prominently Chŏng Mongju.

=== Strifes of the Princes ===
After contributing heavily to the overthrowing of the previous dynasty and the establishment of Joseon, he expected to be appointed as successor to the throne. However, his father and Chŏng Tojŏn favored King Taejo's eighth son and Yi Pangwŏn's youngest half-brother (second son of Queen Sindeok), Yi Pangsŏk. This conflict arose chiefly because Chŏng Tojŏn, as the principal architect of the ideological, institutional and legal foundations of the new dynasty, saw Joseon as a kingdom led by its ministers by virtue of the king's appointment. In contrast, Yi Pangwŏn sought direct rule through an absolute monarchy. These differences ultimately contributed to an environment of deep political tension. Meanwhile, Taejo was possibly motivated by deep fondness for his second wife.

Yi Pangwŏn, frustrated that he and his elder brothers had been passed over, began moving to eliminate his half-brothers. After his father fell ill, he launched the First Strife of the Princes, in which he had both sons of Taejo's second wife, including the crown prince, murdered. His eldest surviving brother, Yi Panggwa, then became the new crown prince. Shortly after, Taejo abdicated the throne in favor of Yi Panggwa (posthumously King Jeongjong). As Jeongjong did not have any legitimate sons, he intended to pass the throne onto Yi Pangwŏn after his death. However, in early 1400, their brother Yi Panggan attempted to seize the throne in the Second Strife of the Princes. The coup was suppressed. Soon afterwards, Jeongjong abdicated the throne in favor of Yi Pangwŏn (posthumously King Taejong).

=== Reign ===
==== Consolidation of royal power ====
One of Taejong's first acts as king was to abolish the privilege to maintain private armies which was enjoyed by the aristocracy and the upper echelons of the government. His revoking of the right to keep independent forces effectively severed the upper class' ability to muster large-scale revolts, and drastically increased the number of soldiers employed by the national army.

Taejong's next act was to revise the existing legislation concerning land taxation. With the discovery of previously hidden land, national wealth increased twofold.

In addition, Taejong created a strong central government. In 1400, before taking the throne, he had played a key role in eradicating the Dopyeong Assembly, a branch of the old administration that had monopolized the executive power during the waning years of Goryeo, in favor of the Privy Council; during Taejong's reign, the Privy Council was replaced by the State Council. Taejong also issued an edict according to which all decisions passed by the State Council could only come into effect with the approval of the king. This ended the custom of court ministers making decisions through debate and negotiations among themselves, and thus brought the royal authority to new heights.

Shortly thereafter, Taejong installed a new department known as the Sinmun Office, to hear cases in which aggrieved subjects felt that they had been exploited or treated unjustly by officials or aristocrats.

==== Reforms and policies ====
Despite being the one responsible for Chŏng Mong-ju's assassination, Taejong posthumously honored him as chief state councilor, leading to a great irony — Chŏng Tojŏn, whose policies governed Joseon for five centuries, was vilified throughout the dynasty, while Chŏng Mongju was revered in spite of his opposition to its founding.

Taejong promoted Confucianism as the state ideology, thus demoting Buddhism, which consequently never recovered the glory and great power it had enjoyed during the Goryeo period. He closed many Buddhist temples; their vast possessions were seized and added to the national treasury.

In foreign policy, he was a straight hardliner — he attacked the Jurchens at the northern border and the Japanese pirates on the southern coast. Taejong is also remembered for being the initiator behind the Ōei Invasion of Tsushima Island in 1419.

He set up the system of hopae, an early form of identification which consisted of tags recording the bearer's name and place of residence; those tags were used to control the movements of the population.

In 1403, Taejong ordered 100,000 pieces of metal type and two complete fonts. Predating Gutenberg and Laurens Janszoon by several decades, he accomplished the metal movable type.

He promoted commerce and education, and also reformed the Sapyeongsunwibu (사평순위부), Joseon's early military and law enforcement agency, and separated the Ŭigŭmbu as Joseon's law enforcement agency but without military functions.

=== Later life and death ===
In 1418, Taejong abdicated in favor of his third legitimate son, Yi To (posthumously King Sejong, commonly known as Sejong the Great), but continued to rule with an iron fist and decide on important matters.

Along the years, as a means to strengthen royal authority and subdue corruption, he executed or exiled some of the supporters who helped him ascend to the throne; he also executed the four brothers of his wife Queen Wŏngyŏng, as well as Sejong's father-in-law, Sim On, and Sim's younger brother, Sim Chŏng, in order to limit the influence of in-laws and powerful clans.

King Taejong died four years after his abdication, in Suganggung. He was buried alongside Queen Wŏn'gyŏng within Heolleung (헌릉), today part of the Heonilleung burial ground in Seocho District, Seoul.

== Legacy ==
Taejong remains a relatively controversial figure in Korean history, as he eliminated many of his rivals (such as Chŏng Mongju and Chŏng Tojŏn), and yet ruled effectively to improve the populace's lives, strengthen national defense, and lay down a solid foundation for his successor's reign.

Outside of Korea, he is better known for having fallen off his horse in the early years of his reign and requesting historians to not record his fall, which they did anyway.

The king himself rode a horse and shot arrows at a deer. However, the horse stumbled, causing him to fall off, but he was not injured. Looking around, he said, "Do not let the historians know about this." (Note: 親御弓矢, 馳馬射獐, 因馬仆而墜, 不傷. 顧左右曰: "勿令史官知之.")

— Taejong Sillok, vol. 7, entry 4

== Family ==
- Father: King Taejo (태조대왕; 4 November 1335 – 27 June 1408)
  - Grandfather: Yi Chach'un (이자춘), King Hwanjo (환조대왕; 1315 – 3 May 1360)
  - Grandmother: Queen Ŭihye (의혜왕후), of the Yeongheung Ch'oe clan (영흥 최씨; ?–1336)
- Mother: Queen Sinŭi (신의왕후), of the Cheongju Han clan (청주 한씨; 6 October 1337 – 25 November 1391)
  - Grandfather: Han Kyŏng (한경), Internal Prince Anch'ŏn (안천부원군)
  - Grandmother: Grand Princess Consort of Samhan State (삼한국대부인), of the Saknyeong Sin clan (삭녕 신씨)
- Stepmother: Queen Sindeok (신덕왕후), of the Goksan Kang clan (곡산 강씨; 20 July 1356 – 23 September 1396)

Consort(s) and their respective issue

- Queen Wŏn'gyŏng (원경왕후), of the Yeoheung Min clan (여흥 민씨; 6 August 1365 – 27 August 1420)
  - Princess Chŏngsun (정순공주; 1385 – 18 September 1460), first daughter
  - Princess Kyŏngjŏng (경정공주; 1387 – 29 June 1455), second daughter
  - Unnamed son (1389)
  - Unnamed son (1390)
  - Unnamed son (1392)
  - Princess Kyŏngan (경안공주; 1393 – 8 June 1415), third daughter
  - Yi Che (이제), Grand Prince Yangnyŏng (양녕대군; 1394 – 8 October 1462), first son
  - Yi Po (이보), Grand Prince Hyoryŏng (효령대군; 29 January 1396 – 22 June 1486), second (third) son
  - Yi To (이도), King Sejong (세종대왕; 15 May 1397 – 8 April 1450), third (fourth) son
  - Princess Chŏngsŏn (정선공주; 1404 – 5 March 1424), fourth daughter
  - Yi Chong (이종), Grand Prince Sŏngnyŏng (성녕대군; 12 August 1405 – 20 March 1418), sixth son
  - Unnamed son (1412)
- Concubine Myŏng (명빈), of the (old) Andong Kim clan (구 안동 김씨; ?–1479)
- Concubine Ŭi (의빈), of the Andong Kwŏn clan (안동 권씨; 1384–1468)
  - Princess Chŏnghye (정혜옹주; ? – 5 November 1424), fifth daughter
- Concubine Hyo (효빈), of the Kim clan (김씨; ? – 2 April 1454)
  - Yi Pi (이비), Prince Gyeongnyeong (경녕군; 23 January 1396 – 15 October 1458), fourth (second) son
- Concubine Sin (신빈), of the Yeongwol Sin clan (영월 신씨; 1377 – 10 March 1435)
  - Yi In (이인), Prince Hamnyŏng (함녕군; 28 January 1403 – 5 November 1467), fifth son
  - Yi Chŏng (이정), Prince Onnyŏng (온녕군; 1407 – 16 June 1454), seventh son
  - Princess Chŏngsin (정신옹주; 1404 – 17 October 1452), sixth daughter
  - Princess Chŏngjŏng (정정옹주; 1410 – 11 April 1456), seventh daughter
  - Princess Sukjŏng (숙정옹주), eighth daughter
  - Princess Suknyŏng (숙녕옹주), 10th daughter
  - Princess Sosin (소신옹주; 1415 – 27 July 1437), 11th daughter
  - Princess Sosuk (소숙옹주; ? – 18 December 1456), 13th daughter
  - Princess Sukkyŏng (숙경옹주; 1420–1494), 16th daughter
- Concubine Sŏn (선빈), of the Sunheung An clan (순흥 안씨; ? – 15 July 1468)
  - Yi Chi (이지), Prince Hyeryeong (혜령군; 1407 – 1 August 1440), eighth son
  - Princess Kyŏngsin (경신옹주), 12th daughter
  - Princess Sukan (숙안옹주; ? – 25 June 1464), 14th daughter
  - Yi Ch'i (이치), Prince Ingnyŏng (익녕군; 1422 – 21 August 1464), 12th son
- Concubine So (소빈), of the Jangyeon No clan (장연 노씨; ? – 15 November 1479)
  - Princess Sukhye (숙혜옹주; 1413 – 30 August 1464), ninth daughter
- Concubine Chŏng (정빈), of the Ko clan (고씨; ? – 24 August 1426)
  - Yi Nong (이농), Prince Kŭnnyŏng (근녕군; 1411 – 25 December 1461), ninth son
- Sugŭi (숙의), of the Ch'oe clan (최씨)
  - Unnamed daughter (1400–1402)
  - Yi T'a (이타), Prince Huiryeong (희령군; 1412 – 7 August 1465), 10th son
- Sugŭi (숙의), of the Yi clan (이씨; ?–1443)
  - Yi Kan (이간), Prince Huryŏng (후령군; 1419 – 18 November 1450), 11th son
- Mistress Sukkonggung (숙공궁주), of the Cheongdo Kim clan (청도 김씨)
- Mistress Ŭijŏnggung (의정궁주), of the Hanyang Cho clan (한양 조씨; ?–1454)
- Mistress Hyesungung (혜순궁주), of the Goseong Yi clan (고성 이씨; ? – 8 April 1438)
- Mistress Sinsungung (신순궁주), of the Seongju Yi clan (성주 이씨; 1390–?)
- Mistress Tŏksuk (덕숙옹주), of the Yi clan (이씨)
- Mistress Hyesŏn (혜선옹주), of the Hong clan (홍씨)
- Mistress Sunhye (순혜옹주), of the Andong Chang clan (안동 장씨; ? – 9 September 1423)
- Mistress Sŏgyŏng (서경옹주), of the Kim clan (김씨)
- Palace Lady (궁인), of the Kim clan (김씨)
  - Princess Sukkŭn (숙근옹주; ? – 15 September 1450), 15th daughter
- Palace Lady (궁인), of the Yi clan (이씨)
  - Princess Suksun (숙순옹주; ?–1481), 17th daughter
- Unknown
  - Unnamed son (1400–1401)
  - Unnamed son (1403–1404)
  - Unnamed daughter (1412–1414)

== Ancestry ==
Ancestors of Taejong of Joseon

Yi Haengni, King Ikjo (익조대왕 이행리)
Yi Ch'un, King Dojo (도조대왕 이춘)
Queen Jeongsuk, of the Yeongheung Ch'oe clan (정숙왕후 영흥 최씨)
Yi Chach'un, King Hwanjo (환조대왕 이자춘)
Park Kwang, Internal Prince Anbyŏn (안변부원군 박광)
Queen Kyŏngsun, of the Munju Park clan (경순왕후 문주 박씨)
King Taejo (태조대왕)
Ch'oe Chongdae, Count Yŏnghŭng (영흥백 최종대)
Ch'oe Hangi, Internal Prince Yŏnghŭng (영흥부원군 최한기)
Grand Princess Consort of Joseon State, of the Kim clan (조선국대부인 김씨)
Queen Ŭihye, of the Yeongheung Ch'oe clan (의혜왕후 영흥 최씨)
Grand Princess Consort of Joseon State, of the Yi clan (조선국대부인 이씨)
King Taejong
Han Yu (한유)
Han Kyuin (한규인)
Han Kyŏng, Internal Prince Anch'ŏn (안천부원군 한경)
Queen Sinŭi, of the Cheongju Han clan (신의왕후 청주 한씨)
Sin Yunryŏ (신윤려)
Grand Princess Consort of Samhan State, of the Saknyeong Sin clan (삼한국대부인 삭녕 신씨)

== In popular culture ==
- Portrayed by Im Hyuk-joo in the 1983 KBS1 TV series Foundation of the Kingdom.
- Portrayed by Lee Jung-gil in the 1983 MBC TV series The King of Chudong Palace.
- Portrayed by Yoo Dong-geun in the 1996–1998 KBS1 TV series Tears of the Dragon.
- Portrayed by Kim Yeong-cheol in the 2008 KBS TV series The Great King, Sejong and the 2016 KBS1 TV series Jang Yeong-sil.
- Portrayed by Baek Yoon-sik in the 2011 SBS TV series Deep Rooted Tree.
- Portrayed by Choi Tae-joon in the 2012–2013 SBS TV series The Great Seer.
- Portrayed by Park Yeong-gyu in the 2012 film I Am the King.
- Portrayed by Ahn Jae-mo in the 2014 KBS1 TV series Jeong Do-jeon.
- Portrayed by Ahn Nae-sang in the 2015 JTBC TV series More Than a Maid.
- Portrayed by Jang Hyuk in the 2015 film Empire of Lust and the 2019 JTBC TV series My Country: The New Age.
- Portrayed by Nam Da-reum and Yoo Ah-in in the 2015–2016 SBS TV series Six Flying Dragons.
- Portrayed by Kam Woo-sung in the 2021 SBS TV series Joseon Exorcist.
- Portrayed by Joo Sang-wook in the 2021–2022 KBS1 TV series The King of Tears, Lee Bang-won.
- Portrayed by Lee Hyun-wook in the 2025 tvN TV series The Queen Who Crowns.

== See also ==
- History of Korea
- List of monarchs of Korea
- Styles and titles in Joseon
- Politics of Joseon
- Cheonsang Yeolcha Bunyajido
- Chen Yanxiang (Chinese merchant from Java who was hosted by Taejong during his reign)

== Sources ==
- Kang, Jae-eun (2006). The Land of Scholars: Two Thousand Years of Korean Confucianism. Homa & Sekey Books. ISBN 978-1-931907-37-8.

Taejong of Joseon House of Yi Born: 21 June 1367 Died: 8 June 1422
Royal titles
Preceded by Jeongjong	King of Joseon; 7 December 1400 – 18 September 1418	Succeeded by Sejong
