= Jangyeon No clan =

Korean clan from South Hwanghae Province

- Country: Korea
- Current region: Changyon County
- Founder: No Gu
- Connected members: Paul Roh Ki-nam

Jangyeon No clan (Korean: 장연 노씨; Hanja: 長淵 盧氏) was one of the Korean clans. Their Bon-gwan was in Changyon County, South Hwanghae Province. According to the research in 2015, the number of Jangyeon No clan was 10907. Their founder was No Gu who became Prince of Jangyeon (Hanja: 長淵伯). He was a 4th son of No Hae who was dispatched to Silla when he was a Hanlin Academy in Tang dynasty.

== See also ==
- Korean clan names of foreign origin
