= Princess Chŏngsun =

Joseon princess (1385–1460)

Princess Chŏngsun 정순공주
- Princess of Joseon
- Born: 1385; Goryeo
- Died: 25 August 1460 (age 74 - 75); Joseon
- Spouse: Yi Paekkang (m.1399)
- Issue: Princess Chŏnggyŏng
- Clan: Jeonju Yi clan (by birth); Gyeongju Yi clan (by marriage)
- Dynasty: House of Yi
- Father: Taejong of Joseon
- Mother: Queen Wŏn'gyŏng
- Religion: Korean Buddhism

Korean name
- Hangul: 정순공주
- Hanja: 貞順公主
- RR: Jeongsun gongju
- MR: Chŏngsun kongju

Princess Chŏngsun (Korean: 정순공주; Hanja: 貞順公主; 1385 – 25 August 1460) was a royal princess during Joseon era. She was the eldest legitimate daughter of Taejong of Joseon and his consort, Queen Wŏn'gyŏng.

== Life ==
Lady Yi was born in 1385 during the reign of King U of Goryeo Her parents were Yi Pangwŏn and Lady Min.

In 1399, she was chosen to marry Yi Paekkang of the Gyeongju Yi clan, son of Yi Kŏyi (이거이), Military commander of Kanggye. In 1401, after her father seized the throne, Lady Yi received the title Princess Chŏngsun and her husband received the title Internal Prince Ch'ŏngp'yŏng (청평위). During her marriage, she became pregnant only once and gave birth to a healthy daughter, Princess Chŏnggyŏng, who would live to adulthood.

== Family ==
- Father: King Taejong of Joseon (13 June 1367 – 30 May 1422)
  - Paternal Grandfather: King Taejo of Joseon (27 October 1335 – 18 June 1408)
  - Paternal Grandmother: Queen Sinŭi of the Cheongju Han clan (1337 – 21 October 1391)
- Mother: Queen Wŏn'gyŏng of the Yeoheung Min clan (29 July 1365 – 18 August 1420)
  - Maternal Grandfather: Min Che, Duke Mundo, Internal Prince Yŏhŭng (민제 여흥부원군 문도공; 閔霽 文度公 驪興府院君; 1339 – 15 January 1408)
  - Maternal Grandmother: Princess Consort Samhan'guk of the Yeosan Song clan (삼한국대부인 여산 송씨; 三韓國大夫人 礪山 宋氏 1342–1414);

Consorts and their respective issues:

- Husband: Yi Paekkang, Internal Prince Ch'ŏngp'yŏng of the Gyeongju Yi clan (이백강 청평위, 1583 – 1451)
  - Princess Chŏnggyŏng of the Gyeongju Yi (정경부인 청주 이씨), 1st daughter
    - Son-in-law: Yi Kyerin of the Hansan Yi clan (이계린)
