= Prince Gyeongnyeong =

Prince of Joseon Korea (1396–1458)

Yi Bi 이비 李裶
- Prince Gyeongnyeong
- Born: 23 January 1396; Prince Jeongan’s private residence, Gaeseong, Gyeonggi Province, Joseon
- Died: 15 October 1458 (aged 62); Judeok-eup, Chungju, Chungcheong Province, Joseon
- Burial: Chungju, North Chungcheong Province, South Korea
- Spouse: Princess Consort Cheongwon of the Cheongpung Kim clan; Princess Consort Ma of the Mokcheon Ma clan; Princess Consort Choe of the Jeonju Choe clan
- Issue: 8 sons and 1 daughter (legitimate); 2 sons and 2 daughters (illegitimate)
- House: House of Yi
- Father: Taejong of Joseon
- Mother: Royal Noble Consort Hyo of the Cheongpung Kim clan

- Korean name
- Hangul: 이비
- Hanja: 李裶
- RR: I Bi
- MR: I Pi

Royal title
- Hangul: 경녕군
- Hanja: 敬寧君
- RR: Gyeongnyeonggun
- MR: Kyŏngnyŏnggun

Prince Gyeongnyeong (Korean: 경녕군; Hanja: 敬寧君, 23 January 1396 – 15 October 1458) was a Royal Prince of the Joseon period as the fourth son of King Taejong and his concubine, Royal Noble Consort Hyo of the Cheongpung Kim clan. He served as a government official for his father, his brother Sejong the Great, his nephews Munjong and Sejo, and grandnephew Danjong.

== Biography ==
Yi Bi was born on 23 January 1396 (In the lunar calendar: 13 December 1395) to King Taejong and Lady Kim of the Cheongpung Kim clan. Prior to becoming the king's concubine, Lady Kim was originally a maid at the Min household who had been serving Queen Wongyeong before she became crown princess consort in 1392.

The prince was born after his mother entered the palace when Queen Wongyeong and King Taejong ascended the throne in 1401. According to Taejong’s statement, when Lady Kim gave birth, she was persecuted or threatened by the Queen and her brothers. This later prompted the King, in the process of purging Queen Wongyeong's younger brothers, Min Mu-hyul and Min Mu-hoe, to hold them accountable for "endangering the lives of Prince Gyeongnyeong and his mother.”

His mother was later given the royal title of Princess Hyosun (효순궁주, 孝順宮主).

It said that he was kind-hearted and had strong filial piety. Yi was excellent at academics and taught his younger brothers how to write.

It was said that his legal mother, Queen Wongyeong, and his biological mother did not get along after his birth. Rumors that had spread throughout the palace said Queen Wongyeong had been mistreating the Prince and his mother. So in anger and retaliation, Taejong exiled Min Mu-hyeol and Min Mu-hoe, the brothers of Queen Wongyeong, where they were later either forced to commit suicide or hung as execution.

But despite this, Yi Bi had a good relationship with his older brother, Yi Do (the future King Sejong) as well as his legal mother, who helped the young prince with his education.

In governmental affairs, when there were difficulties in the royal family and in state affairs, the Prince tried to solve them with allegiance. For five generations, including Taejong, Sejong, Munjong, Danjong, and Sejo, he was loyal to and cooperated with the government.

In February 1416, the 16th year of King Taejong, the 13-year-old prince and his younger half-sister, the 12-year-old Princess Jeongseon, married. The prince married Lady Kim of the Cheongpung Kim clan, daughter of Kim Gwan and a relative from his mother’s clan, while the princess married Nam Hui. He later remarried twice and had a concubine; with his four consorts, he had thirteen children.

In 1419, the 1st year of King Sejong, he became a teacher at the order of King Taejong, and went to Beijing in the Ming dynasty. He came back with gifts.

During the mourning period after Queen Wongyeong died in 1420, it is said that the prince scolded and argued with his father for having an affair with a kisaeng named Il Jeom-hong (일점홍; 一點紅). Rather than punishing the prince, King Sejong felt touched that his older brother reprimanded their father during a time of grief.

After King Sejo ascended to the throne, he moved to Chungju to spend the rest of his life there. In August 1458, the 4th year of King Sejo’s reign, he participated in the Eumbokyeon held at Geunjeongjeon Hall, and died in Chungju on September 9, a month later. When Prince Gyeongnyeong died, King Sejo suspended all court meetings and writing for three days, and bestowed a condolence gift of 100 seok of rice and beans, 200 volumes of paper, 40 rolls of Jeongpo, and 3 rolls of Baekjeopo to his family.

In 1872, during King Gojong’s 9th reign of year, his mother’s royal title changed to First Senior Consort (정1품 효빈, 孝嬪), and was entitled as Royal Noble Consort Hyo.

The cemetery is located in Hwanggeumsan (黃金山), Eumdong Village, Sarak-ri, Judeok-eup, Chungju, North Chungcheong Province. In front of the cemetery is Myeongdeoksa, a shrine that houses the memorial tablet of Prince Gyeongnyeong.

== Family ==
- Father: King Taejong of Joseon (태종 조선; 13 June 1367 – 30 May 1422)
  - Grandfather: Taejo of Joseon (October 27, 1335 – May 24, 1408)
  - Grandmother: Queen Sinui of the Anbyeon Han clan (신의왕후 한씨; September 1337 – October 21, 1391)
- Mother: Royal Noble Consort Hyo of the Cheongpung Kim clan (효빈 김씨; 1375 – 2 April 1454) (Note: In the Annals of King Taejong, she is mentioned as Queen Wongyeong's servant.)
  - Uncle: Kim Hwa-sang (김화상; 金和尙; 1373–?)
- Wives and their issues:
  - Princess Consort Cheongwon of the Cheongpung Kim clan (청원군부인 청풍 김씨; 1395–1450); eldest daughter of Kim Gwan (김관; 金灌; 1358–1421)
    - Son: Yi Jil, Prince Goyang (고양군 질; 1418 – 13 March 1449)
    - Son: Yi Chi, Prince Ohseong (오성군 치; 1425–?)
    - Son: Yi Chan, Prince Euncheon (은천군 찬; 1426–1481)
    - Son: Yi Ri (영선도정 이리; 1427–?)
    - Son: Yi Yeong, Prince Bokseong (복성군 영; 1435–1487)
    - Daughter: Lady Yi of the Jeonju Yi clan (전주 이씨; 1439–?)
    - Son: Yi Chu, Prince Garim (가림군 추; 1441–?)
  - Princess Consort Ma of the Mokcheon Ma clan (군부인 목천 마씨; 1411–?)
    - Son: Yi Jik, Prince Moyang (모양군 직; 1438–1511)
  - Princess Consort Choe of the Jeonju Choe clan (군부인 전주 최씨; 1420–?)
    - Son: Yi Su (수봉 단산도정 창선대부 승현록대부 이수; 1444–?)
  - Unnamed concubine
    - Son: Yi Geo (이거)
    - Son: Yi Jeok (이적)
    - Daughter: Lady Yi of the Jeonju Yi clan (전주 이씨)
    - Daughter: Lady Yi of the Jeonju Yi clan (전주 이씨)

== In popular culture ==
- Portrayed by Yoon Young-joon in the 2008 KBS1 and KBS2 TV series The Great King, Sejong
