= The Great King, Sejong =

2008 South Korean television series

- Promotional poster
- Also known as: King Sejong the Great; The Great King Sejong
- Hangul: 대왕 세종
- Hanja: 大王世宗
- RR: Daewang Sejong
- MR: Taewang Sejong
- Genre: Historical
- Created by: Kim Sung-geun
- Written by: Yoon Seon-joo; Kim Tae-hee
- Starring: Kim Sang-kyung; Yoon Se-ah; Lee Jung-hyun; Lee Yoon-ji
- Music by: Cheol-ho Choi; Lee Ji-yong
- Opening theme: 소원 (Wish) by K.Will
- Country of origin: South Korea
- No. of episodes: 86

Production
- Producer: Yoon Chang-beom KBS Drama Headquarters
- Camera setup: Multi-camera
- Running time: Saturdays and Sundays 21:30 (KST)
- Production company: KBS self-production

Original release
- Network: KBS1; KBS2
- Release: January 5 – December 7, 2008

The Great King, Sejong (Korean: 대왕 세종) is a 2008 South Korean historical television series depicting the life of the fourth monarch of Joseon, Sejong the Great (played by Kim Sang-kyung). Considered the greatest king in Korean history, Sejong created Hangul, the Korean alphabet. The series aired on KBS from January 5 to December 7, 2008, on Saturdays and Sundays at 21:30 for 86 episodes. Episodes 1 to 26 aired on KBS1, and episodes 27 to 86 aired on KBS2.

== Plot ==
Born as the third son, Chungnyeong was far from ascending the throne. His early years were turbulent as Joseon faced political tensions from both within and abroad. Eventually, the young prince finds himself living in a private residence outside of the palace and experiences the everyday life of commoners until he is a young man. After his ascension to the throne, Chungyeong (now called King Sejong) stabilizes the newly born country and gives rise to a blooming culture. In the process he invents Hangul, the Korean writing system.

== Cast ==
=== Main ===
- Kim Sang-kyung as Grand Prince Chungnyeong / King Sejong the Great
  - Kim Do-hyun as child Grand Prince Chungnyeong
  - Lee Hyun-woo as young Grand Prince Chungnyeong
- Kim Young-chul as King Taejong; Sejong's father
- Choi Myung-gil as Queen Wongyeong of the Yeoheung Min clan; Sejong's mother
- Park Sang-min as Grand Prince Yangnyeong; Sejong's first brother
  - Jung Chan-woo as child Grand Prince Yangnyeong
  - Lee In as teenage Grand Prince Yangnyeong
- Lee Jung-hyun as Royal Noble Consort Shin of the Cheongju Kim clan; Sejong's concubine
- Lee Yoon-ji as Queen Soheon of the Cheongsong Shim clan; Sejong's wife
  - Nam Ji-hyun as young Lady Shim

=== Supporting ===
==== People in Joseon ====
===== Royal household =====
- Lee Sang-yeob as Crown Prince Yi Hyang; Sejong's first son
  - Oh Eun-chan as child Crown Prince Yi Hyang
  - Kang Bit as young Crown Prince Yi Hyang
- Seo Joon-young as Grand Prince Suyang; Sejong's second son
  - Choi Min-ho as young Grand Prince Suyang
- Yoo Seo-jin as Lady Kim, Grand Princess Consort Suseong of the Gwangsan Kim clan; Yangnyeong's wife
  - Yeo Yoon-jung as young Lady Kim
- Ahn Shin-woo as Grand Prince Hyoryeong; Sejong's second brother
  - Seo Hyun-bin as child Grand Prince Hyoryeong
  - Yoo Tae-woong as young Grand Prince Hyoryeong
- Kwon Sung-hyun as Lady Jeong, Grand Princess Consort Yeseong of the Haeju Jeong clan; Hyoryeong's wife
- Yoon Young-joon as Prince Gyeongnyeong; Sejong's fourth brother
  - Noh Young-hak as young Prince Gyeongnyeong
- Baek Seung-do as Grand Prince Seongnyeong; Sejong's sixth brother
  - Joo Young-min as child Grand Prince Seongnyeong
- Joo Da-young as Princess Jeongso; Sejong's first daughter
  - Kim Ji-won as child Princess Jeongso
- Lee Joo-hyun as Princess Jeongui; Sejong's second daughter
- Yeo Min-joo as Crown Princess Sun of the Haeum Bong clan; Yi Hyang's second wife
- Han Shi-hoon as Grand Prince Anpyeong; Sejong's third son
  - Kang Han-byul as child Grand Prince Anpyeong
- Yoon Se-ah as Royal Noble Consort Hyo of the Cheongpung Kim clan; Taejong's concubine
- Kang Kyung-hun as Cho Gung-jang; Jeongjong's concubine
- Jo Sun-ok as Royal Noble Consort Ui of the Andong Kwon clan; Taejong's concubine
- Noh Young-guk as King Jeongjong; Sejong's second uncle
- Jung Doo-hong as King Taejo; Sejong's grandfather

===== New supporters =====
- Kim Kap-soo as Chief State Councillor Hwang Hui
- Ahn Dae-yong as Maeng Sa-sung
- Lee Won-jong as Yun Hoe
- Jo Sung-ha as Yi Su
- Sun Dong-hyuk as Choe Yun-deok
- Lee Jin-woo as Jeong In-ji
- Lee Sung-min as Choe Man-ri
- Kim Young-ki as Byeon Gye-ryang
- Lee Byung-wook as Kim Jong-seo
- Lee Dal-hyung as Shin Jang
- Kwon Yul as Shin Suk-ju
- Oh Yong as Jung Chang-son
- Yoon Ki-won as Uhm Ja-chi

===== Old supporters =====
- Kim Ki-hyun as Yu Jung-hyun
- Jung Dong-hwan as Jo Mal-saeng
- Kim Ha-kyun as Heo Jo
- Kim Jung-hak as Kim Mun

===== Others =====
- Lee Chun-hee as Jang Yeong-sil
- Jun Hyun as Yi Cheon
- Lee Dae-yeon as Choe Hae-san
- Choi Jong-won as Ha Ryun
- Park Young-ji as Park Eun
- Choi Sang-hoon as Shim On; Sejong's father-in-law
- Jung Heung-chae as Kang Sang-in
- Choi Joo-bong as Kim Han-ro
- Kim Eung-soo as Min Mu-gu, Sejong's first maternal uncle
- Lee Kyung-young as Min Mu-jil, Sejong's second maternal uncle
- Kim Hyung-il as Min Mu-hyul, Sejong's third maternal uncle
- Lee Woo-suk as Min Mu-hoe, Sejong's fourth maternal uncle
- Kim Joo-young as Yi Suk-beon
- Park Sang-jo as Yi Jong-mu
- Jang Ki-yong as Yi Soon-mong
- Lee Won-bal as Park Sil
- Hwang Bum-shik as Noh Hee-bong

==== People in Ming ====
- Oh Seung-yoon as the Emperor Jeongtong
  - Kim Jin-sung as child Jeongtong
- Go In-bum as Eunuch Hwang Eom
- Lee Dae-ro as Eunuch Wang Jin
- Kim Hak-chul as Huang Chan
- Jeong Yu-mi as Da-yeon
- Ha Yong-jin as Hae Su, Huang Chen's commander
- Shim Woo-chang as Yeo-jin

==== People in Goryeo ====
- Kim Yong-soo as Wang Ahn
- Kim Myung-kon as Ok Hwan
- Kim Seung-wook as Jeon Haeng-su
- Jung Ui-gap as Mu-bi
- Moon Chun-shik as Jeon Il-ji
- Choi Sang-kil as Jang Chil-sang
- Park Yong-soo as Han Young-ro

==== People in Japan ====
- Bae Sung-woo as Pyung Do-jun
- Jang Se-jin as Jong Jung-sung
- Seo Jin-won as Jong Jun
- Park Jung-woo as Jung Wu
- Lee Jong-goo as General Gu Ju

==== People in Jurchen ====
- Shin Dong-hoon as Yi Man-ju
- Bang Hyung-joo as Dong Maeng-ga
- Ham Suk-hoon as Ah-woo, Dong Maeng-ga's older brother

=== More ===
- Lee Il-jae as Kim Do-ryun
- Lee Jung-hyun as Yi Seon
- Cha Min-ji as Dam-yi
- Kim Bo-mi as Court Lady Han
- Jo Byung-ki as Sa-ddo
- Jo Min-joon as Park Kyum
- Kang Ji-hu as Pung-gae
- Won Jong-rye as Kisaeng Nyu; Jang Young-shil's mother
- Ahn Hae-sook as Lady Ahn of the Sunheung Ahn clan; Sejong's mother-in-law
- Kwon Sung-hyun as Yi Kyung-sook
- Sun-Hak as Oh Mak-ji
- Jung Jong-hyun as the head of Ikisima
- Kim Sun-eun as Tong-sa
- Kim Seung-hoon as Yamata
- Jo Jae-wan as Jang Won
- Oh Yeon-seo as Eori
- Kim Hong-pyo as Yi Soon-ji
- Seol Ji-yoon as Toegi-chunwol
- Lee Han-gal as Kang-hwi
- Kim Ji-young as the old woman

== Awards and nominations ==
Year	Award	Category	Recipient	Result
2008	2nd Korea Drama Awards	Excellence Award, Actor	Kim Sang-kyung	Nominated
2008	KBS Drama Awards	Top Excellence Award, Actor	Kim Sang-kyung	Nominated
2008	KBS Drama Awards	Top Excellence Award, Actress	Choi Myung-gil	Nominated
2008	KBS Drama Awards	Excellence Award, Actor in a Serial Drama	Lee Won-jong	Won
2008	KBS Drama Awards	Excellence Award, Actor in a Serial Drama	Park Sang-min	Nominated
2008	KBS Drama Awards	Excellence Award, Actress in a Serial Drama	Lee Yoon-ji	Won
2008	KBS Drama Awards	Best Supporting Actress	Kim Sung-ryung	Nominated
2008	KBS Drama Awards	Best New Actor	Lee Chun-hee	Nominated
2008	KBS Drama Awards	Best New Actress	Oh Yeon-seo	Nominated
2008	KBS Drama Awards	Best Young Actor	Lee Hyun-woo	Won
2008	KBS Drama Awards	Best Young Actress	Yeo Min-joo	Nominated
