= Hampyeong No clan =

Korean clan from South Jeolla Province

- Country: Korea
- Current region: Hampyeong County
- Founder: No Mok
- Connected members: No Jae-wook

Hampyeong No clan (Korean: 함평 노씨; Hanja: 咸平 魯氏) was one of the Korean clans. Their Bon-gwan was in Hampyeong County, South Jeolla Province. According to the research in 2005, the number of Hampyeong No clan was 35231. The name of Lu came from China. The name was made when Bo Qin was appointed as Lu and called himself as Lu. Lu Zhonglian who was a loyal family of Qi during Warring States period era founded Gija Joseon with Gija when Lu Zhonglian conquered Korea. No Mok, a descendant of Lu Zhonglian, began Hampyeong No clan because he was appointed as Prince of Gasu (Hanja: 嘉樹君) after he became a Palace Attendant (Hanja: 侍中) in Goryeo during Injong of Goryeo’s reign.

== See also ==
- Korean clan names of foreign origin
