= Queen Inwon =

Queen of Joseon from 1702 to 1720

Queen Inwon 인원왕후 仁元王后

Grand queen dowager of Joseon
- Tenure: 11 October 1724 – 13 May 1757
- Predecessor: Grand Queen Dowager Jaui
- Successor: Grand Queen Dowager Yesun

Queen dowager of Joseon
- Tenure: 12 July 1720 – 11 October 1724
- Predecessor: Queen Dowager Hyeonyeol
- Successor: Queen Dowager Gyeongsun

Queen consort of Joseon
- Tenure: 3 October 1702 – 12 July 1720
- Predecessor: Queen Inhyeon
- Successor: Queen Seonui
- Born: 24 October 1687; Yangjeongjae, Sunhwa District, Hanseong, Joseon
- Died: 2 May 1757 (aged 69); Yangmodang Hall, Changdeok Palace, Hanseong, Joseon
- Burial: Myeongreung
- Spouse: Yi Sun, King Sukjong
- Issue: Yi Geum, King Yeongjo of Joseon (adopted)
Posthumous name
- 혜순자경헌렬광선현익강성정덕수창영복융화휘정정운정의장목인원왕후 惠順慈敬獻烈光宣顯翼康聖貞德壽昌永福隆化徽靖正運定懿章穆仁元王后
- House: Gyeongju Kim
- Father: Kim Ju-Shin
- Mother: Internal Princess Consort Garim of the Imcheon Jo clan

Queen Inwon (24 October 1687 – 2 May 1757; 인원왕후 김씨), of the Gyeongju Kim clan, was a posthumous name bestowed to the wife and fourth queen consort of Yi Sun, King Sukjong, the 19th Joseon monarch. She was queen consort of Joseon from 1702 until her husband's death in 1720. She was honoured as Queen Dowager Hyesun (Korean: 혜순왕대비) during the reign of her step-son Yi Yun, King Gyeongjong, and later as Grand Queen Dowager Hyesun (Korean: 혜순대왕대비) during the reign of her adoptive son, Yi Geum, King Yeongjo.

== Biography ==
=== Early life ===
Born on 3 November 1687 during the thirteenth year of the reign of King Sukjong, the future queen was the second daughter of Kim Ju-shin, and his wife, Lady Jo of the Imcheon Jo clan. She had one older sister, a younger sister, and two younger brothers.

Through her 3rd great-grandmother, Lady Kim was a 9th great-granddaughter of King Jeongjong and Royal Consort Suk-ui of the Pyeongchang Yi clan; through their son, Yi Jong-saeng, Prince Jinnam.

=== Marriage and palace life ===
The 15 year old Lady Kim married the 42 year old King Sukjong on 3 October 1702; following the death of Queen Inhyeon in September and the execution of Jang Hui-bin in November of 1701. Technically, she was Sukjong's fourth queen consort, but is officially recorded as the third queen consort of King Sukjong. Jang Ok-jeong was the actual third queen consort, but was ousted upon Queen Inhyeon's reinstatement.

Her parents were royally entitled as Internal Prince Gyeongeun (경은부원군) and Internal Princess Consort Garim (가림부부인).

There is no record of the young Queen and the King having children amongst them. But in 1703, she adopted Royal Noble Consort Suk’s son, Prince Yeoning, despite being 7 years his senior, who was known to be her favorite and whom she regarded as her own son.

In her early years of marriage, it was recorded that the young Queen had suffered from measles, toothaches, boils, and smallpox. Which in 1711, she came down with smallpox prompting Choi Suk-bin to order the gungnyeo to go out of the palace and look for remedies among the commoners to save the Queen, who in the end survived.

=== Life as queen dowager ===
Following Sukjong's death in 1720, she was honoured as Queen Dowager Hyesun (혜순왕대비). Although her family was Soron, she changed her faction to Noron after Sukjong's death due to the political turmoil her adoptive son was dealing with within the palace.

King Gyeongjong suffered ill health and was unable to produce an heir—or to do much of anything for that matter. During his reign, the Noron and Soron factions battled for power. The Soron faction were the ruling political faction and supported Gyeongjong, and the Noron faction supported his half-brother, Prince Yeoning. The Noron faction and his step-mother, Queen Dowager Hyesun pressured him to appointed Prince Yeoning as his heir.

According to one theory, Queen Seonui opposed Prince Yeoning and planned secretly to adopt Prince Milpung, a great-grandson of Crown Prince Sohyeon, King Injo's first son. But two months after the King's enthronement, Prince Yeoning was installed as Crown Prince Successor (Wangseje, 왕세제, 王世弟).

Following the death of her step-son, King Gyeongjong, and the accession of her adoptive son, King Yeongjo, in 1724, she was honoured as Grand Queen Dowager Hyesun (혜순대왕대비).

It’s said that during her time in the palace, Queen Dowager Hyesun wrote 3 books: Syeongyun Yusa (션균유사), Syeonbi Yusa (션비유사), and Nyuk Ayukjang (뉵아육장).

=== Later life ===
During King Yeongjo’s reign, the Queen Dowager received filial piety from her adopted son and his wife, Queen Jeongseong.

On 3 April 1757, her adoptive daughter-in-law Queen Jeongseong had died at the age of 64 within Changdeok Palace.

About a month later, the Queen Dowager also died on 13 May 1757 in the thirty-third year reign of King Yeongjo at Changdeok Palace, aged 69. She is buried in Myeongreung in Goyang city, Gyeonggi Province, near the tombs of King Sukjong and his second queen consort, Queen Inhyeon.

She was posthumously honored as Queen Inwon (인원왕후; 仁元王后). The king later remarried to a young noble girl from her family clan, later posthumously honored as Queen Jeongsun, in 1759 after the mourning period ended.

King Yeongjo’s son, Crown Prince Sado, from Royal Noble Consort Yeong, had been said to have grieved immensely which caused his mental illness to worsen. This was because the crown prince was close to his legal grandmother, Queen Inwon, and legal mother, Queen Jeongseong.

His actions eventually caused him to die in a rice chest in 1762; five years after both of the queen's death.

== Family ==
Parent

- Father − Internal Prince Gyeongeun, Kim Ju-shin (경은부원군 김주신; 慶恩府院君 金柱臣; 1661–1721)
- Mother − Internal Princess Consort Garim of the Imcheon Jo clan (가림부부인 임천 조씨; 嘉林府夫人 林川 趙氏; 1660–1731)

Sibling

- Older sister − Lady Kim of the Gyeongju Kim clan (1680–?)
- Younger brother − Kim Hu-yeon (김후연; 金後衍; 1694–1735)
- Younger brother − Kim Gu-yeon (김구연; 金九衍; 1699–1742); became the adoptive son of Kim Gae-shin (김개신; 金介臣)
- Younger half-sister − Lady Kim of the Gyeongju Kim clan (1700–?)
- Younger sister − Lady Kim of the Gyeongju Kim clan (증 정부인 경주 김씨; 贈 貞夫人 慶州 金氏; 1701–?)
- Younger half-brother − Kim Ga-yeon (김가연; 金可衍; 1703–1749)
- Younger half-brother − Kim Nae-yeon (김내연; 金乃衍; 1708–1779)

Consort

- Husband − Yi Sun, King Sukjong (숙종대왕; 1661–1720)
  - Father-in-law − Yi Yeon, King Hyeonjeong (현종대왕; 1641–1674)
  - Mother-in-law − Queen Myeongseong of the Cheongpung Kim clan (명성왕후 김씨; 1642–1684)
- Sister-in-law − Princess Myeongseon (명선공주; 1659–1673)
- Sister-in-law − Princess Myeonghye (명혜공주; 1662–1673)
- Sister-in-law − Yi On-hui, Princess Myeongan (명안공주; 1665–1687)

Issue

- Adoptive son − Yi Geum, King Yeongjo (영조대왕; 1694–1776)

== Full posthumous name ==
She was given the posthumous title

- Queen Inwon, Hyesun Jagyeong Heonryeol Gwangseon Hyeonik Kangseong Jeongdeok Suchang Yeongbok Yunghwa Hwijeong Jeongwoon Jeongui Jangmok Inwon Wanghu
- 혜순자경헌렬광선현익강성정덕수창영복융화휘정정운정의장목인원왕후
- 惠順慈敬獻烈光宣顯翼康聖貞德壽昌永福隆化徽精正運定懿章穆仁元王后.

== In popular culture ==
- Portrayed by Kang Boo-ja in the 1988 MBC TV series 500 Years of Joseon: Memoirs of Lady Hyegyeong.
- Portrayed by Kim Yong-rim in the 1998 MBC TV series The Great's King Road
- Portrayed by Oh Yeon-seo in the 2010 MBC TV series Dong Yi.
- Portrayed by Kim Hae-sook in the 2015 film The Throne.
- Portrayed by Nam Ki-ae in the 2019 SBS TV series Haechi.

Queen Inwon Gyeongju Kim clan
Royal titles
Preceded by Queen Inhyeon of the Yeoheung Min clan	Queen consort of Joseon; 1702–1720	Succeeded by Queen Seonui of the Hamjong Eo clan
Preceded by Queen Dowager Hyeonryeol (Myeongseong) of the Cheongpung Kim clan	Queen dowager of Joseon; 1720–1724	Succeeded by Queen Dowager Gyeongsun (Seonui) of the Hamjong Eo clan
Preceded by Grand Queen Dowager Jaui (Jangnyeol) of the Yangju Jo clan	Grand queen dowager of Joseon; 1724–1757	Succeeded by Grand Queen Dowager Yesun (Jeongsun) of the Gyeongju Kim clan
