= Huibin Jang =

Queen of Joseon from 1690 to 1694

- Royal Consort of the First Senior Rank

Queen Consort of Joseon
- Tenure: 1690–1694
- Predecessor: Queen Inhyeon
- Successor: Queen Inhyeon
- Born: 3 November 1659; Sangpyeong-bang, Hanseong, Joseon
- Died: 9 November 1701 (aged 42); Chwiseondang, Changgyeonggung, Hanseong, Joseon
- Burial: Daebinmyo, Seooreung Cluster, Goyang, South Korea
- Spouse: King Sukjong (m. 1690–1694) (Note: Lady Jang had become Sukjong's consort at least a decade prior to her elevation to the position of queen and legitimate wife, and despite her subsequent demotion, she continued to be a royal consort until her death.)
- Issue Detail: 2 sons
Names
- Jang Ok-jeong (장옥정; 張玉貞)
Regnal name
- Grand Internal Concubine Oksan (옥산부대빈; 玉山府大嬪) (Note: Known as honorific name (존호; 尊號) in the Sinosphere, its closest equivalent in the English-speaking world is the regnal name.)
- Clan: Indong Jang (by birth); Jeonju Yi (by marriage)
- Dynasty: Yi
- Father: Jang Hyeong
- Mother: Lady, of the Papyeong Yun clan

Korean name
- Hangul: 희빈 장씨
- Hanja: 禧嬪 張氏
- RR: Huibin Jangssi
- MR: Hŭibin Changssi

Huibin Jang (Korean: 희빈 장씨; Hanja: 禧嬪 張氏; 3 November 1659 – 9 November 1701), or Concubine Hui, (Note: The literal translation of bin (빈; 嬪) is "concubine". Combined with the honorific title hui (희; 禧), the full meaning is "Auspicious Concubine".) of the Indong Jang clan, personal name Jang Ok-jeong, was a consort of King Sukjong, the 19th monarch of Joseon, and the mother of King Gyeongjong. She was queen of Joseon from 1690 until her deposition in 1694, and is remembered today as one of the greatest femmes fatales in Korean history.

== Biography ==
=== Early life ===
Lady Jang was the daughter of Jang Hyeong and his second wife, a lady from the Papyeong Yun clan. Part of the Namin faction, she came from a long line of interpreters and belonged to the jungin class.

She is widely thought to have been one of the most beautiful women in Joseon, and her charm is mentioned in the Veritable Records of the Joseon Dynasty.

She became a lady-in-waiting to King Sukjong's step-great-grandmother, Grand Queen Dowager Jaui, at the recommendation of Prince Dongpyeong, who was the king's first cousin once removed and the grand queen dowager's step-grandson.

=== Life as royal consort ===
While visiting Queen Jaui, the king came to be infatuated with Lady Jang and she became a special palace lady (승은궁녀; seungeun gungnyeo). However, his mother, Queen Dowager Hyeonyeol, who belonged to the Seoin faction, feared that Lady Jang would influence him to favor the Namin, so she expelled her from the palace.

In 1683, the queen dowager died and Queen Min (posthumously Queen Inhyeon), Sukjong's wife at that time, allowed Lady Jang to return to court.

In 1686, Lady Jang became a royal consort of the junior fourth rank (숙원; sugwon). In 1688, she was elevated to senior second rank (소의; soui) after giving birth to the King's first son, Yi Yun.

In the court, the Seoin faction split into Noron (Old Learning), led by Song Si-yeol, and Soron (New Learning), led by Yun Jeung. The Noron was supported by Queen Min.

The Namin faction pushed for the king to acknowledge Yi Yun as heir apparent, but the Seoin faction insisted that Queen Min was still young and could bear a son, who should be the heir. Sukjong pushed for a compromise in which Queen Min would adopt Yi Yun as her son, but she refused. This angered Sukjong, and many were killed, including Song Si-yeol. The Namin faction seized power and exiled Queen Min's father and the leaders of the Seoin faction. In 1689, Queen Min was deposed and exiled. This incident is called Gisa Hwanguk (기사환국).

Also in 1689, Lady Jang was promoted to the senior first rank (빈; bin), with the honorific title hui (희), meaning "auspicious". Shortly after, she was appointed as queen.

In 1693, Sukjong's new favorite, a palace maid from the Haeju Choe clan, became an official royal consort. Lady Choe (commonly known by her highest title, Sukbin Choe or Concubine Suk) openly supported Queen Min and encouraged the king to reinstate her. In the meantime, Kim Chun-taek, a member of the Noron faction, and Han Jung-hyuk of the Soron faction, also staged a campaign to reinstate the deposed queen.

By 1694, Lady Jang had lost the king's favor. Sukjong grew disgusted with the Namin faction's greed and the ever-powerful Jang family. He also felt remorse for his temperamental actions during the Gisa Hwanguk. The Namin faction's attempt to purge the Seoin on the charge of plotting to reinstate the deposed queen backfired.

=== Later years and death ===
The king banished Jang Hui-jae, Lady Jang's elder brother, and the leaders of the Namin party. He officially demoted Lady Jang to her former position as a royal consort of the senior first rank (Huibin or Concubine Hui), and reinstated Queen Min. This incident is called Gapsul Hwanguk (갑술환국). The Namin faction never recovered from this purge.

The Soron faction supported Crown Prince Yun, Lady Jang's son, while the Noron faction supported Prince Yeoning, Lady Choe's son.

In 1701, Queen Min died of an unknown cause. Allegedly, Sukjong discovered Lady Jang conspiring with a shaman priestess to curse Queen Min using black magic and gloating over her death. The Soron faction pleaded with the king to show mercy and pointed out that she was the mother of the crown prince.

Unmoved, the king sentenced Lady Jang, her mother, her brother, the leader of Soron, and all her companions to death. He also exiled the courtiers who had asked him to spare Lady Jang's life. Sukjong then promulgated an edict prohibiting any royal consort from becoming queen. On 9 November 1701, Lady Jang was executed by poisoning at Chwiseondang, her residence inside Changgyeonggung. She was 42 years old.

=== Burial ===
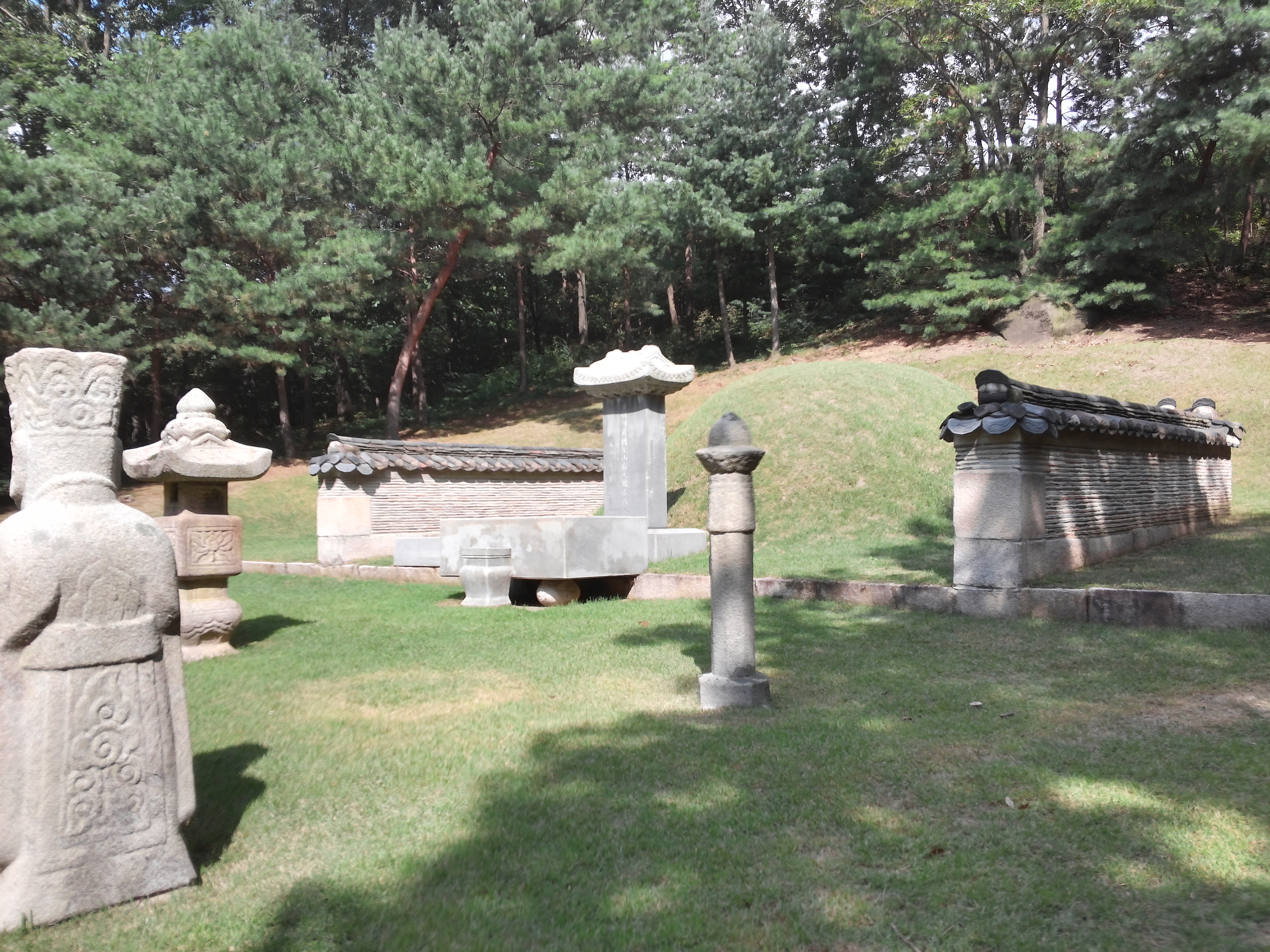
The tomb of Lady Jang

Her tomb is called Daebinmyo and was originally in Gwangju, Gyeonggi Province. In 1969, it was moved to the Seooreung Cluster, in Goyang, Gyeonggi Province; the cluster also contains Ingneung, the tomb of Sukjong's first wife, Queen Ingyeong, as well as Myeongneung, which consists of the twin burial mounds of King Sukjong and Queen Inhyeon, and the separate burial mound of Sukjong's third wife, Queen Inwon. The relocation took place because the tomb was blocking the government's planned expansion of the city.

Lady Jang's memorial tablet was enshrined in Chilgung (칠궁), the place that houses the spirit tablets of seven royal consorts who gave birth to kings.

== Titles ==
- During the reign of King Hyeonjong (r. 1659–1674):
  - Lady, of the Indong Jang clan (인동 장씨; 仁同張氏)
    - Jang Hyeong's daughter (장형의 딸)
    - Lady Jang (장씨; 張氏)
  - Palace Lady (궁녀; 宮女; from unknown date)
- During the reign of King Sukjong (r. 1674–1720):
  - Special Palace Lady (승은궁녀; 承恩宮女; from unknown date)
  - Sugwon (Note: lit. ''Lady of Warm Beauty'') (숙원; 淑媛; from 23 January 1687), royal consort of the junior fourth rank
  - Soui (Note: lit. ''Lady of Bright Deportment'') (소의; 昭儀; from 19 November 1688), royal consort of the senior second rank
  - Concubine Hui (희빈; 禧嬪; from 17 January 1689), royal consort of the senior first rank
  - Queen (왕비; 王妃; from 1690)
  - Concubine Hui (희빈; 禧嬪; from 12 April 1694), royal consort of the senior first rank

== Family ==
- Father: Jang Hyeong (장형; 25 February 1623 – 12 January 1669)
- Stepmother: Lady, of the Jeju Go clan (제주 고씨; ?–1645) (Note: Jang Hyeong's first wife.)
- Mother: Lady, of the Papyeong Yun clan (파평 윤씨; 1626–1698)
- Sibling(s)
  - Brother: Jang Hui-sik (장희식; 1640–?) (Note: Half-brother.)
  - Sister: Lady, of the Indong Jang clan (인동 장씨)
  - Brother: Jang Hui-jae (장희재; 1651 – 29 October 1701)
- Consort of: King Sukjong (숙종대왕; 7 October 1661 – 12 July 1720)
- Issue
  - Yi Yun (이윤), King Gyeongjong (경종대왕; 20 November 1688 – 30 September 1724)
  - Unnamed son (23 August – 17 October 1690) (Note: His childhood name was Seong-su (성수).)

== Ancestry ==
Ancestors of Huibin Jang

Jang Se-pil (장세필)
Jang Su (장수)
Jang Eung-in (장응인)
Jang Hyeong (장형; 張烱)
Park Sim (박심)
Lady, of the Nampo Park clan (남포 박씨)
Concubine Hui
Yun Seong-rib (윤성립)
Lady, of the Papyeong Yun clan (파평 윤씨)
Lady, of the Chogye Byeon clan (초계 변씨)

== In popular culture ==
- Portrayed by Kim Ji-mee in the 1961 film Jang Hui-bin.
- Portrayed by Nam Jeong-im in the 1968 film Femme Fatale, Jang Hee-bin.
- Portrayed by Youn Yuh-jung in the 1971 MBC TV series Jang Hui-bin.
- Portrayed by Lee Mi-sook in the 1981 MBC TV series Women of History: Jang Hui-bin.
- Portrayed by Jun In-hwa in the 1988 MBC TV series 500 Years of Joseon: Queen Inhyeon.
- Portrayed by Jung Sun-kyung in 1995 SBS TV series Jang Hee Bin.
- Portrayed by Kim Hye-soo in the 2002–2003 KBS2 TV series Royal Story: Jang Hui-bin.
- Portrayed by Yoon Se-ah in the 2007 film Shadows in the Palace.
- Portrayed by Lee So-yeon in the 2010 MBC TV series Dong Yi.
- Portrayed by Choi Woo-ri in the 2012 tvN TV series Queen and I.
- Parodied by members of the pop band Shinhwa in the 25 August 2012 episode of JTBC variety show Shinhwa Broadcasting.
- Portrayed by Kim Tae-hee and Kang Min-ah in the 2013 SBS TV series Jang Ok-jung, Living by Love.
- Portrayed by Oh Yeon-ah in the 2015 SBS TV series Jackpot.
- Inspired a fictional royal consort portrayed by Lim Ji-yeon in the 2026 SBS TV series My Royal Nemesis.

== See also ==
- History of Korea
- Political factions of Joseon
- Politics of Joseon
- Styles and titles in Joseon
- Society of Joseon

== Notes ==
Huibin Jang Indong Jang clan
Royal titles
Preceded by Queen Inhyeon of the Yeoheung Min clan	Queen Consort of Joseon; 1690–1694	Succeeded by Queen Inhyeon of the Yeoheung Min clan
