= Queen Inhyeon =

Queen of Joseon (1681–1689, 1694–1701)

Queen Inhyeon 인현왕후 仁顯王后

Queen consort of Joseon
- First tenure: 2 May 1681 – 4 May 1689
- Predecessor: Queen Ingyeong
- Successor: Jang Ok-jeong
- Second tenure: June 1694 – 14 August 1701
- Predecessor: Queen Jang
- Successor: Queen Inwon
- Born: 23 April 1667; Bansong-dong, Hanseong, Joseon
- Died: 14 August 1701 (aged 34); Gyeongchunjeon Hall, Changgyeong Palace, Hanseong, Joseon
- Burial: Myeongneung Mausoleum, Seooneung Cluster, Goyang, Gyeonggi Province, South Korea
- Spouse: Sukjong of Joseon (m. 1681; dep. 1688) (m. 1694)
Posthumous name
- Queen Hyogyeong Sukseong Jangsun Wonhwa Uiyeol Jeongmok Inhyeon; 효경숙성장순원화의열정목인현왕후; 孝敬淑聖莊純元化懿烈貞穆仁顯王后
- Clan: Yeoheung Min (by birth); Jeonju Yi (by marriage)
- Dynasty: Yi (by marriage)
- Father: Min Yu-jung, Internal Prince Yeoyang
- Mother: Internal Princess Consort Eunseong
- Religion: Korean Buddhism

- Queen Inhyeon
- Hangul: 인현왕후
- Hanja: 仁顯王后
- RR: Inhyeon wanghu
- MR: Inhyŏn wanghu

Queen Inhyeon (Korean: 인현왕후; Hanja: 仁顯王后; 23 April 1667 – 14 August 1701), of the Yeoheung Min clan, was the second wife of King Sukjong, the 19th Joseon monarch. She was queen of Joseon from 1681 until her deposition in 1688, and from her reinstatement in 1694 until her death in 1701. She is one of the best known queens in Korean history and her life has been portrayed in many historical dramas.

== Biography ==
=== Early life and family ===
Born during King Hyeonjong’s 8th year of reign on 15 May 1667 into the Yeoheung Min clan, the future queen was the second daughter of Min Yu-jung, and his second wife, Lady Song of the Eunjin Song clan.

Through her mother, Lady Min was the maternal granddaughter of Song Jun-gil, who was a member of the Seoin faction. As well as a 5th adoptive great-granddaughter of Yi Ŏnjŏk. Due to the shared blood on her maternal side, and eventually due to her two older brother's marriages, she was a distant relative of Queen Myeongseong and Queen Ingyeong.

In terms of the number of relatives, Queen Ingyeong and Queen Inhyeon were 11-degree relatives. Queen Inhyeon was a 10-degree relative in the same line as Queen Ingyeong's father, Kim Man-gi, and her uncle, Kim Man-jung. Queen Ingyeong's great-grandfather, Kim Gye-hwi, is the uncle of Queen Inhyeon's maternal great-grandmother, Lady Kim of the Gwangsan Kim clan (Song Jun-gil's mother), and Song Jun-gil's maternal grandfather, Kim Eun-hwi, is Kim Gye-hwi's younger brother.

In addition, Queen Inhyeon's aunt, Lady Hong of the Namyang Hong clan (Min Jeong-jung's second wife), and Queen Ingyeong's grandmother, Lady Yun of the Haepyeong Yun (Kim Man-gi and Kim Man-jung's mother) are maternal cousins. Kim Man-gi and Kim Man-jung's maternal grandmother Lady Hong (Hong Myeong-won's daughter) is also the sister of Hong Cheo-yun (Min Jeong-jung's father-in-law) and Hong Cheo-hu (Han Seong-woo's father-in-law).

Queen Ingyeong's grandmother, Lady Yun, was a maternal cousin-in-law to Hong Su-heon (Hong Cheo-hu's son and Han Seong-woo's brother-in-law) who married the daughter of Yi Suk, who was the sister of Queen Inhyeon's brother-in-law, Yi Man-chang. Queen Inhyeon's eldest sister-in-law (Min Jin-hu's wife) and Kim Man-jung's wife are 6th cousins, and Min Jin-hu's father-in-law, Yi Dan-sang and Kim Man-jung's father-in-law, Yi Eun-sang, are her cousins. In addition, Queen Ingyeong's in-laws, Kim Man-gyun and Min Jin-hu, became the 4th cousins of Queen Inhyeon. Around the time of Queen Inhyeon's death, Kim Gwang-taek, Queen Ingyeong's 5th degree nephew and Kim Man-jung's grandson became Min Jin-hu's son-in-law and Queen Inhyeon's nephew.

Through her paternal grandmother, Lady Yi of the Yeonan Yi clan, Lady Min was also a 4th great-granddaughter of King Seongjong, a great-great-great-granddaughter of Princess Gyeongsuk, and a first cousin twice removed of Heo Jeok.

Through her great-great-great-grandmother, Lady Min of the Yeoheung Min clan, the maternal grandmother of Lady Yi, the Queen was a first cousin thrice removed of Royal Noble Consort Jeong, a concubine of King Seonjo.

In 1672, Lady Min’s mother died after giving birth to her younger twin sisters. Her father later remarried after mourning Lady Song’s death.

Lady Min's character was known to be highly virtuous, benevolent, and kind to those around her.

=== Marriage and life as Queen Consort ===
One year after Queen Ingyeong’s death, Queen Dowager Hyeonryeol and Song Si-yeol (who was from the Seoin faction and later the Noron faction), and being one of the Queen Dowager's and Lady Min's maternal relative as well as a close friend of her maternal grandfather, had recommended Lady Min to become the next nation's mother.

She later married the 20-year-old King Sukjong in the Spring of 1681 at the age of 14 and became his second queen consort. Her parents were royally entitled as Internal Prince Yeoyang (여양부원군, Yeoyang Buwongun), and her mother as Internal Princess Consort Eunseong (은성부부인; Eunseong Bubuin). Her father's first wife was also royally entitled as Internal Princess Consort Haepung (해풍부부인, 海豊府夫人; Haepung Bubuin) as well as his third wife, Internal Princess Consort Pungchang (풍창부부인, 豊昌府夫人; Pungchang Bubuin).

It was said that during the early years of the marriage, she did not receive any affection from the King as he went to Palace Lady Jang. Despite this, it was stated that as queen, she handled everything with generosity and with an open mind.

However, the King did have a house built for the Queen’s father in 1687 to which it was named the House of Gamgodang. This house eventually housed the birth of the future Empress Myeongseong. (Note: The House of Gamgodang is that in which she lived from her birth until she was eight. In 1687, a hut for the king's father-in-law, the father of Queen Inhyeon, Min Yu-jung was built. Only the main building remains today, but the building was restored to its natural state in 1995. In the room where the empress studied as a child, a monument was erected inscribed with the words "Empress Myeongseong Tangangguri" (the village where Empress Myeongseong was born) to commemorate her birth.)

But at some point, Palace Lady Jang was then banished from the palace by the Queen Dowager as she didn't want her son to be influenced from the political faction she was affiliated with. After her mother-in-law's death in 1684, King Sukjong brought back Palace Lady Jang and went to her for comfort; soon favoring her as his concubine. Because of this, the Queen recommended Kim Su-hang's granddaughter (since Kim Su-hang was also a member of the Seoin faction), Lady Kim of the Andong Kim clan (later Royal Noble Consort Yeong), as his concubine to keep Lady Jang in check, but she was unsuccessful.

When Sukjong's concubine who belonged to the Southerners (Namin) faction, So-ui (Note: So-ui (소의) was 3rd rank concubine of the King. See Styles and titles in the Joseon dynasty.) Jang Ok-jeong, give birth to a son, Yi Yun in 1688, it created a bloody dispute called Gisa Hwanguk (기사환국). During this time, Sukjong wanted to give his eldest son (entitled the wonja, literally the "First Son") the title of "Crown Prince" and wanted to promote Jang Ok-jeong from So-ui to Hui-bin. (Note: Bin (빈) was the highest rank concubine of the King. See Styles and titles in the Joseon dynasty)

This action was opposed by the Westerners (Seoin) faction, who supported the Queen led by Song Si-yeol, but was supported by the Namin faction, who supported Jang Ok-jeong.

The King pushed for a compromise in which the Queen would adopt Yi Yun as her son. However, the Queen refused to do so. Sukjong became angry at the opposition, and many were killed, including Song Si-yeol. Many, including the Queen's family, were forced into exile. The Queen herself was deposed in 1688 and exiled to Anguk-dong (modern-day Samcheong-dong, Jongno-gu, Seoul). But was later exiled to a closed temple called Cheongeumsa Temple in Gimcheon, Gyeongsangbuk Province where she became a devoted Buddhist.

=== Aftermath ===
After ridding the former Queen of her position, Jang Ok-jeong was eventually elevated from Royal Consort So-ui (senior second rank) to Royal Noble Consort Hui (Hui-bin) (senior first rank). But was soon after appointed as queen consort.

The Seoin faction split into the Noron (Old Learning) faction and the Soron (New Learning) faction. In the meantime, Kim Chun-taek who was member of the Noron faction and Han Jung-hyuk from the Soron faction, staged a campaign to reinstate the Deposed Queen Min. In 1693, Sukjong's new favorite, a palace maid from the Haeju Choe clan, was officially elevated as a royal concubine with the rank of Suk-won (Senior 4th rank). (Note: Suk-won (숙원) was 8th or the lowest rank concubine of the King. See Styles and titles in the Joseon dynasty) Royal Consort Suk-won (later Royal Noble Consort Suk), was an open supporter of the Deposed Queen Min and encouraged the King to reinstate her to her original position as queen.

Later, Sukjong felt remorse at his temperamental actions during Gisa Hwanguk. He also grew disgusted by the greed of the Namin faction and the ever-powerful Indong Jang family. Within the government, the Namin attempt to purge the Seoin on the charge of plotting to reinstate the Deposed Queen, but the attempt backfired.

After the attempt, prime minister and Soron faction leader Nam Gu-man (남구만, 南九萬; 1629–1711), said on April 17, 1694, “The reinstatement of Lady Min has already been decided, so arguing over it is like a son discussing about his mother and a subject discussing about the king. Hui-bin's position was not expelled because of a crime, but it was unavoidable because there could not be two queens while Lady Min was reinstated” (‘민씨의 복위는 이미 정해졌으니 이에 대해 거론하여 다투는 것은 아들이 어머니에 대해 논하고 신하가 임금에 대해 의논하는 것이니 천하의 도리에 맞지 않으며, 희빈의 강호는 죄가 있어서 폐출된 것이 아니라 민씨가 복위함에 있어 왕비가 둘이 있을 수 없으니 부득이한 것이다’).

In 1694, he officially demoted Jang Ok-jeong to her former position, Bin, and reinstated the Deposed Queen as queen consort on June 1 and brought her back into the palace. This incident is called Gapsul Hwanguk (갑술환국). Nam Gu-man was able to execute two Noron supporters, Yeong Su (영수) and Min Am (민암, 閔黯; 1636–1694) for involvement, but Jang Hui-jae was able to escape death. This led to the King to banish Jang Hui-jae, Jang Ok-jeong's older brother, to Jeju Island and the leaders of the Namin party. The Namin faction would never recover from this purge politically.

=== Illness and death ===
On 24 March 1700, lunar calendar, the Queen's illness was first reported with physicians stating that the diagnosis, at the time, was severe gout. The pain in both legs, especially the right side, was severe, and there was swelling near the lumbosacral region in the upper part of the abductor, and the pain was said to be difficult to bear by the queen, and as time passed, the area where the pain was felt, spread.

On April 14, convulsions started in the legs, leading to convulsions throughout the body, and the situation became serious. Due to treatment, the most severe convulsions gradually decreased, and by May 5, the convulsions seemed to have completely stopped. But on May 7, swelling starting coming up to the abdomen, and created an emergency to treat.

On May 12, pus was seeded in the ashy hole under the yocheok where acupuncture was placed the previous day (파종, 破腫: pus from the abscess was squeezed out), and on June 21, pus was also seeded in the right cheek area where acupuncture had been previously performed. From this point on, the treatment of Ongjeo (옹저) began in parallel.

The Queen experienced severe pain in the lower body, especially in the legs and joints, and pus filling up around the affected area to the point where the skin and muscles feel separated from each other. She also started getting symptoms of nausea, vomiting, abdominal pain, diarrhea, and fever; resulting in loss of appetite. As well as the addition of sleep disorder, physical strength deteriorated rapidly within the queen.

These symptoms lasted for about a year, and on 8 July 1701 (27th year of Sukjong's reign), lunar calendar, the affected area expanded and reached the abdomen. The Queen's temperature became cold and diarrhea reached more than 10 times a day as recorded by physicians.

On August 12, lunar calendar, it was reported that there was swelling in the mouth and the Queen's urine was red, and that she had trouble using the restroom properly. Especially at night, the immersion was uncomfortable because of the pain in the legs.

Suddenly, the next day, August 13, lunar calendar, the Queen's condition rapidly deteriorated between 11:00 a.m. and 1:00 p.m. With symptoms such as fainting, cold sweat on her forehead and back, and having an irregular pulse. On 14 of August 1701, from the hours of 1:00 am to 3:00 am, the Queen died of an unknown disease in a sanatorium at Changgyeong Palace in the quarters of Gyeongchunjeon.

Some sources say that she was poisoned, but the late Queen was posthumously honored as Queen Inhyeon (인현왕후; 仁顯王后).

It has been said that Sukjong, while mourning for Inhyeon, dreamed of her in a sobok dress drenched with blood. Sukjong asked Inhyeon of how she died, but Inhyeon didn't say anything, but pointed in the direction of Jang Hui-bin's chambers. Sukjong awoke, then went into Hui-bin's chambers. While approaching, he heard music and sounds of laughter. Eavesdropping, he saw Jang Hui-bin with Shamanist priestesses in her chambers, praying for the Queen's death, while striking a figurine with arrows.

Others have stated that another interpretation, based on a vague passage of the Annals of the Joseon Dynasty, states that it was Royal Noble Consort Suk who told the King that sorcery had been used to try to bring harm to the Queen. Under the title "Queen's Will" it is written:

"Choe Suk-bin with her usual grace gives tribute to the Queen, and weeping for the one that could not win the heart of the King, she informed the King of the secret."

But in the Annals of the Joseon Dynasty recorded in 1701, it states that Min Jin-won and Min Jin-hu, the late Queen Inhyeon's older brothers, informed King Sukjong of Jang Hui-bin's sorcery, claiming that in doing so they were in compliance with Queen Inhyeon's last request to them before she died. According to Min Jin-won, the rumor in the palace was that Jang Hui-bin had been using a shaman to curse the Queen and she learned of these rumors.

Regardless of how this was discovered by Sukjong, he learned that she had built a shamanist altar within her quarters, where effigies with the name of the Queen were found. When her ladies-in-waiting were interrogated, they declared that she had ordered them to shoot arrows at a portrait of Queen Inhyeon three times at day, and had them bury dead animals in the Queen's palace's garden.

After concluding what the royal consort did was evil, Jang Hui-bin was executed for her actions by poison, one month after the Queen's death, on October 29. After her death, King Sukjong enacted a law forbidding concubines with the rank of Bin to become Queen Consort.

One of Queen Inhyeon's ladies in waiting wrote a book called Queen Inhyeon's Story (인현왕후전; 仁顯王后傳), which still exists today. She is buried in Myeongreung (명릉; 明陵) in Gyeonggi Province, and Sukjong was later buried near her in the same area. She had no issue to Sukjong.

== Family ==
- Father - Min Yu-jung, Internal Prince Yeoyang (민유중, 여양부원군; 1630 – 29 June 1687)
- Mother
  - Step - Yi Hyo-ah, Internal Princess Consort Haepung of the Deoksu Yi clan (이효아 해풍부부인 덕수 이씨; 李孝兒 海豊府夫人 德水 李氏; 1634 – 12 February 1712)
  - Biological - Internal Princess Consort Eunseong of the Eunjin Song clan (은성부부인 은진 송씨, 恩城府夫人 恩津 宋氏; 27 July 1637 – 28 November 1672); Min Yu-jung's second wife
  - Step - Internal Princess Consort Pungchang of the Pungyang Jo clan (풍창부부인 풍양 조씨; 豊昌府夫人 豐壤 趙氏; 25 February 1659 – 22 March 1741)

Sibling(s)

- Older half-sister - Lady Min of the Yeoheung Min clan (여흥 민씨; 驪興 閔氏; 1650–?)
- Older sister - Lady Min of the Yeoheung Min clan (여흥 민씨; 驪興 閔氏; 1656–1728)
- Older brother - Min Jin-hu (민진후; 10 January 1659 – 1720)
- Older brother - Min Jin-won (민진원; 1664–1736)
- Younger sister - Lady Min of the Yeoheung Min clan (여흥 민씨; 驪興 閔氏; 1669–?)
- Younger half-sister - Lady Min of the Yeoheung Min clan (여흥 민씨; 驪興 閔氏; 1671–?)
- Younger sister - Min Jeong-seong, Lady Min of the Yeoheung Min clan (민정성 여흥 민씨; 1672–1672)
- Younger sister - Min Jeong-je, Lady Min of the Yeoheung Min clan (민정제 여흥 민씨; 1672–?)
- Younger half-sister - Lady Min of the Yeoheung Min clan (여흥 민씨; 驪興 閔氏; 1678–1741)
- Younger half-brother - Min Jin-yeong (민진영; 閔鎭永; 1682–1724)
- Younger half-brother - Min Jin-chang (민진창; 閔鎭昌; 1682–1727)
- Younger half-brother - Min Jin-oh (민진오; 閔鎭五; 1684–1753)
- Younger half-sister - Lady Min of the Yeoheung Min clan (여흥 민씨; 驪興 閔氏); 1686–?)

Husband

- Yi Sun, King Sukjong of Joseon (7 October 1661 – 12 July 1720) — No issue.
  - Father-in-law - King Hyeonjong of Joseon (14 March 1641 – 17 September 1674)
  - Mother-in-law - Queen Myeongseong of Cheongpung Kim clan (13 June 1642 – 21 January 1684)

== Trivia ==
Inhyeon's eldest brother Min Jin-hu's great-great-great-granddaughter would eventually marry Inhyeon's step-great-great-great-great-adoptive-grandson, the future Emperor Gojong of the Korean Empire, becoming the famous Empress Myeongseong.

Emperor Gojong's mother, Grand Internal Princess Consort Sunmok, was a great-great-great-great-great-granddaughter of Queen Inhyeon's younger half-brother, Min Jin-yeong (through her father and his third wife, Lady Jo of the Pungyang Jo clan). Empress Sunmyeong was also a great-great-great-great-granddaughter of Queen Inhyeon's second eldest brother, Min Jin-won.

== In popular culture ==
=== Drama ===
- Portrayed by Jo Mi-ryeong in the 1961 movie Jang Hui Bin.
- Portrayed by Tae Hyun-sil in the 1968 film Femme Fatale, Jang Hee-bin.
- Portrayed by Kim Min-jeong in the 1971 movie Jang Hee Bin.
- Portrayed by Lee Hye-sook in the 1981 MBC TV series Women of History: Jang Hee Bin.
- Portrayed by Park Sun-ae in the 1988 MBC TV series 500 Years of Joseon: Queen Inhyeon
- Portrayed by Kim Won-hee in the 1995 SBS TV series Jang Hee Bin.
- Portrayed by Park Sun-young in the 2002–3 KBS2 TV series Royal Story: Jang Hui-bin.
- Portrayed by Go Seo-hee in the 2007 film Shadows in the Palace.
- Portrayed by Park Ha-sun in the 2010 MBC TV series Dong Yi.
- Portrayed by Kim Hae-in in the 2012 tvN TV series Queen and I.
- Portrayed by Hong Soo-hyun in the 2013 SBS TV series Jang Ok-jung, Living by Love.
- Portrayed by Lee Hyun-ji in the 2015 MBC Every 1 TV series Webtoon Hero Toondra Show

=== Novels ===
- Queen Inhyeon’s story
- Femme Fatale, Jang Hee-bin by Lee Jun-beom and Min Ye-sa, 1994.
- Dong Yi by Lee Jun-hyeok, 2010, Literary Chunchusa, ISBN 978-89-7604-055-8

== See also ==
- Queen Wongyeong - Inhyeon's ascendant through her father
- Empress Myeongseong - Inhyeon's descendant through her older brother
- Empress Sunmyeong - Inhyeon's descendant through her second older brother

== Notes ==
Queen Inhyeon Yeoheung Min clan
Royal titles
Preceded by Queen Ingyeong of the Kim clan	Queen consort of Joseon; 1681 – 5 March 1688	Succeeded by Jang Ok-jeong, Queen of the Indong Jang clan
Preceded by Jang Ok-jeong, Queen of the Indong Jang clan	Queen consort of Joseon; 1694 – 16 September 1701	Succeeded by Queen Inwon of the Gyeongju Kim clan
