= Princess Myeonghye =

Korean princess (1663–1673)

Princess Myeonghye 명혜공주
- Princess of Joseon
- Born: 12 January 1663; Joseon
- Died: 11 June 1673 (aged 10); Joseon
- Burial: Taepyeong-dong, Sujeong District, Seongnam, Gyeonggi Province, South Korea
- House: House of Yi
- Father: Hyeonjong of Joseon
- Mother: Queen Myeongseong of the Cheongpung Kim clan

Princess Myeonghye (Korean: 명혜공주; Hanja: 明惠公主; 12 January 1663 – 11 June 1673) was a Korean princess as the second daughter of Hyeonjong of Joseon and Queen Myeongseong.

== Biography ==
=== Early Life and Death ===
The princess was born during the winter on 12 January 1663 as the second daughter of Hyeonjong of Joseon and Queen Myeongseong. She had two older sisters and a brother, and a younger sister.

At the age of 10, the princess was arranged to marry a son of Shin Jeong (신정), named Shin Yo-gyeong (신요경; 1665–?), of the Pyeongsan Shin clan who was later honoured as Prince Consort Dongan (동안위; 東安尉). However, the Princess suddenly fell ill before the wedding ceremony took place. She later died on April 27, 1673 (lunar calendar date).

=== Aftermath and Burial ===
At the time, King Hyeonjong faced a dilemma regarding how to treat Shin Yo-gyeong; although a betrothal had been arranged, the formal wedding ceremony had not yet taken place when the bride passed away. Consequently, the King convened a discussion to determine the appropriate treatment for Shin, who had been designated to become a Royal Son-in-Law.

Ultimately, King Hyeonjong concluded that, while it might be theoretically possible to maintain Shin in the official status of a Royal Son-in-Law, it would be unconscionable, from a humanitarian standpoint, to forbid him from establishing a family of his own for the remainder of his life. Acting on this judgment, the King revoked the title of Prince Consort Dongan that had been bestowed upon him.

On August 2, barely three months after the passing of Princess Myeonghye, her elder sister, Princess Myeongseon, also met an untimely end, despite her own wedding having already been formally arranged too. Deeply moved by compassion for his two daughters, King Hyeonjong decreed that the provisions of land estates (Jeonjang; 전장, 田庄) and ceremonial supplies (Gongjang; 공장, 供帳) allocated to the two late princesses should continue to be maintained at the same level accorded to his only surviving daughter, Princess Myeongan.

After her only brother, Crown Prince Yi Sun, ascended the throne in 1674, he ordered the royal court to provide assistance in building the shrines for Princess Myeonghye and Princess Myeongseon. When the shrines for his sisters were completed, the royal court had continued to provide assistance through performing the rites of the princesses.

However, during the reign of King Sukjong, a memorial was submitted to the throne arguing for the complete cessation of this financial support; the petition cited concerns that the eunuchs charged with administering these assets were misappropriating them, and that the continued provision of such resources placed a significant financial burden upon the common people.

Nevertheless, King Sukjong rejected the petition. He reasoned that discontinuing the support would not only betray the wishes of his late father, King Hyeonjong, but was also unnecessary, given that the level of support provided to the two princesses had already been substantially reduced. Consequently, no further discussions regarding the cessation of support for the two princesses were held thereafter.

Her tomb was originally located near Heonilleung (헌릉, 獻陵; the tomb of King Taejong and Queen Wongyeong), but was later moved to another place when the redevelopment of Seongnam, Gyeonggi Province happened.

== Others ==
- The royal monument of Princess Myeonghye remains in the Jeongnimsaji Museum, Buyeo-eup, Buyeo County, South Chungcheong Province. The width is 52.9 cm and the height is 179 cm.
- Bongguk Temple (봉국사; 奉國寺), a temple in Sujeong District, Seongnam, Gyeonggi Province, was once rebuilt in order to be used to pray for Princess Myeonghye and her older sister, Princess Myeongseon.
