= Queen Myeongseong =

Queen of Joseon from 1659 to 1674

Queen Myeongseong 명성왕후

Queen dowager of Joseon
- Tenure: 17 September 1674 – 11 January 1684
- Predecessor: Queen Dowager Hyosuk
- Successor: Queen Dowager Hyesun

Queen consort of Joseon
- Tenure: 23 June 1659 – 17 September 1674
- Predecessor: Queen Inseon
- Successor: Queen Ingyeong

Crown Princess consort of Joseon
- Tenure: 1651 – 23 June 1659
- Predecessor: Crown Princess Jang
- Successor: Crown Princess Kim
- Born: 3 June 1642; Jangtongbang, Hanseong, Joseon
- Died: 11 January 1684 (aged 41); Jeoseung Hall, Changgyeong Palace, Hanseong, Joseon
- Burial: Sungreung
- Spouse: Yi Yeon, King Hyeonjong (m. 1651–1674)
- Issue: Unnamed daughter; Princess Myeongseon; Yi Sun, King Sukjong; Princess Myeonghye; Yi On-Hui, Princess Myeongan
Posthumous name
- 현렬희인정헌문덕명성왕후 顯烈禧仁貞獻文德明聖王后
- House: Cheongpung Kim (by birth) Jeonju Yi (by marriage)
- Father: Kim Woo-myeong, Internal Prince Cheongpung
- Mother: Internal Princess Consort Deokeun of the Eunjin Song clan

Queen Myeongseong (Korean: 명성왕후 김씨; 3 June 1642 – 11 January 1684) of the Cheongpung Kim clan, was a posthumous name bestowed to the wife and queen consort of Yi Yeon, King Hyeonjong, the 18th Joseon monarch. She may have been named Cha Young at birth, but there are no records of it. She was queen consort of Joseon from 1659 until her husband's death in 1674, after which she was honored as Queen Dowager Hyeonryeol (현렬왕대비).

She was a wise and intelligent figure, but her fierce personality was said to be the reason why her husband did not have any concubines. The Southerners mocked her as a reincarnation of Queen Munjeong because of her intervention in the politics.

== Biography ==
The future queen was born in Jangtongbang (장통방; 長通坊) on 3 June 1642 during the reign of King Injo as the only daughter within four sons. Her father, Kim Woo-myeong, was a member of the Cheongpung Kim clan. Her mother was a member of the Eunjin Song clan who was distantly related to Song Si-yeol and Song Jun-gil.

In 1651, she was arranged to marry the Crown Prince to which her status and title became Crown Princess Consort Kim (왕세자빈 김씨; 王世子嬪 金氏) or (빈궁 김씨; 嬪宮 金氏).

Her parents also received royal titles; her father received the royal title of “Internal Prince Cheongpung” (청풍부원군 淸風府院君, Cheongpung Buwongun), and her mother received the royal title of “Internal Princess Consort Deokeun of the Eunjin Song clan” (덕은부부인 송씨 德恩府夫人 宋氏, Deokeun Bubuin). Through her younger brother, Kim Seok-yeon, Queen Hyoui is her great-great-grandniece.

Her husband ascended the throne as the 18th Joseon monarch, (temple name: Hyeonjong) in 1659, automatically making her the queen consort. During her husband's reign, she and the King had one son and four daughters; only one died in infancy. The Queen gave birth to an unnamed daughter in 1658, Princess Myeongseon in 1659, Yi Sun in 1661, Princess Myeonghye in 1663, and Princess Myeongan in 1665. In 1667, Yi Sun was appointed as heir to the throne with title Crown Prince Myeongbo.

When her husband died on 17 September 1674, Crown Prince Myeongbo was crowned as the 19th Joseon monarch (temple name: Sukjong) a few days after. Thus, she was honored as Queen Dowager Hyeonryeol (현렬왕대비).

After the death of her daughter-in-law in 1680, the Queen Dowager was recommended Song Jun-gil’s maternal granddaughter (the future Queen Inhyeon) to become the next Queen Consort for her son. With this recommendation, it’s said the reason Lady Min was chosen due to the fact her family was a supporter of the Seoin faction and was distantly related to the Queen Dowager, and the late Queen Ingyeong. Thus, the young now Queen married her son in 1681, but despite having the upper hand in choosing a wife, her son’s relation with a palace maid would eventually cause havoc between them and the court.

Hyeonryeol frequently intervened in the court, criticizing the Southerners (Namin faction) and framed Grand Prince Inpyeong’s sons (Princes Bokchang, Bokseon, and Bokpyeong) with the accusation of adultery with the palace maids. The reason was that she viewed them as threats to her son’s position.

However, there was no evidence to support her accusation and because of her claim, Kim Woo-myeong, the Queen Dowager’s father, ended up being the suspect of initiating the slander against the princes. Hyeonryeol took it up to herself and knelt outside her quarters, pleading for her son to prove the princes’ crime. In the end, Sukjong exiled the three princes and the Southerners mocked her as a reincarnation of Queen Munjeong because of her intervention in the politics. Kim Woo-myeong chose to confine himself in his house following the incident as he felt humiliated, and he died because of severe depression.

After hearing about Sukjong’s relationship with a palace attendant (Jang Ok-jeong), Hyeonryeol sent Jang Ok-jeong out of the palace, since she apparently believed her low status would make the woman ignorant and wicked. However, the real reason was that the woman’s family background as Southerners made the queen believe that she entered the palace to become a spy for the Southerners. She set up a ceremony to pray for her son’s recovery after Sukjong fell unconscious. Hyeonryeol was a firm believer of Shamanism and upon consulting with a shaman, decided to pray and get doused with water while wearing summer clothes despite it being winter. She was hit with a bad flu in January and died in the same month on 11 January 1684 in Changdeok Palace’s Jeoseung Hall.

Although the ministers urged for the shaman to be executed, Sukjong decided to exile her. For her posthumous title, “Myeong” (명; 明) was for being cautious and “Seong” (성; 聖) was for spreading goodness and simplicity; being posthumously honoured as Queen Myeongseong (명성왕후 明聖王后, Myeongseong Wanghu).

== Family ==
- Father − Kim Woo-myeong (김우명; 金佑明; 1619–1675)
- Mother − Internal Princess Consort Deokeun of the Eunjin Song clan (덕은부부인 은진 송씨; 德恩府夫人 恩津 宋氏; 1621–1660)

=== Sibling(s) ===
- Older brother − Kim Man-ju (김만주; 金萬周)
- Younger brother − Kim Seok-ik (김석익; 金錫翼)
- Younger brother − Kim Seok-yeon (김석연; 金錫衍; 1648 – 17 August 1723)
- Younger brother − Kim Seok-dal (김석달; 金錫達)
- Younger half-brother - Kim Seok-cheon (김석천; 金錫賤)
- Younger half-sister - Lady Kim of the Cheongpung Kim clan (청풍 김씨)
- Younger half-brother - Kim Seok-gu (김석구; 金錫耉)
- Younger half-brother - Kim Seok-je (김석제; 金錫悌)
- Younger half-sister - Lady Kim of the Cheongpung Kim clan (청풍 김씨)
- Younger half-brother - Kim Seok-seon (김석선; 金錫善)
- Younger half-brother - Kim Seok-sun (김석순; 金錫順)

=== Spouse ===
- King Hyeonjong of Joseon (현종; 顯宗; 14 March 1641 – 17 September 1674)
  - Father-in-law − King Hyojong of Joseon (효종대왕; 孝宗大王; 3 July 1619 – 23 August 1659)
  - Mother-in-law − Queen Inseon of the Deoksu Jang clan (인선왕후 장씨; 仁宣王后 張氏; 9 February 1619 – 19 March 1674)

=== Issue ===
- Unnamed daughter (1658–1658)
- Daughter − Princess Myeongseon (명선공주; 明善公主; 1659 – 12 September 1673)
  - Son-in-law − Maeng Man-taek (맹만택; 孟萬澤) of the Sinchang Maeng clan (신창 맹씨; 新昌 孟氏; 1660–1710)
- Son − Yi Sun, King Sukjong (숙종대왕; 肅宗大王; 7 October 1661 – 12 January 1720)
  - Daughter-in-law − Queen Ingyeong of the Gwangsan Kim clan (인경왕후 김씨; 仁敬王后 金氏; 25 October 1661 – 16 December 1680)
  - Daughter-in-law − Queen Inhyeon of the Yeoheung Min clan (인현왕후 민씨; 仁顯王后 閔氏; 15 May 1667 – 16 September 1701)
  - Daughter-in-law − Queen Inwon of the Gyeongju Kim clan (인원왕후 김씨; 仁元王后 金氏; 3 November 1687 – 13 May 1757)
- Daughter − Princess Myeonghye (명혜공주; 明惠公主; 12 September 1663 – 11 June 1673)
  - Son-in-law − Shin Yo-gyeong (신요경; 申堯卿) of the Pyeongsan Shin clan (평산 신씨; 平山 申氏)
- Daughter − Yi On-Hui, Princess Myeongan (이온희 명안공주; 李溫姬 明安公主; 30 January 1665 – 16 May 1687)
  - Son-in-law − Oh Tae-ju (오태주; 吳泰周) of the Haeju Oh clan (해주 오씨; 海州 吳氏; 1668–1716)
    - Adoptive grandson − Oh Won (오원; 吳瑗; 1700–1740); son of Oh Jin-ju (오진주; 吳晋周)

== In popular culture ==
- Portrayed by Kim Hae-sook in the 1988 MBC TV series 500 Years of Joseon:Queen In Hyun.
- Portrayed by Kyeon Mi-ri in the 1995 SBS TV series Jang Hee Bin.
- Portrayed by Kim Young-ae in the 2002–3 KBS2 TV series Royal Story: Jang Hui-bin.
- Portrayed by Park Jung-soo in the 2010 MBC TV series Dong Yi.
- Portrayed by Lee Ga-hyun in the 2012 MBC TV series The King's Doctor.
- Portrayed by Kim Sun-kyung in the 2013 SBS TV series Jang Ok-jung, Living by Love.

Queen Myeongseong Cheongpung Kim clan
Royal titles
Preceded by Queen Inseon of the Deoksu Jang clan	Queen consort of Joseon; 1659–1674	Succeeded by Queen Ingyeong of the Kim clan
Preceded by Queen Dowager Hyosuk (Inseon) of the Deoksu Jang clan	Queen dowager of Joseon; 1674–1684	Succeeded by Queen Dowager Hyesun (Inwon) of the Gyeongju Kim clan
