= Princess Myeongan =

Joseon princess (1665–1687)

Princess Myeongan 명안공주
- Princess of Joseon
- Born: Yi On-hui; 30 June 1665; Joseon
- Died: 25 June 1687 (aged 21); Joseon
- Burial: Sasa-dong, Ansan, Gyeonggi Province, South Korea
- Spouse: Oh Tae-ju (m. 1680–1687)
- Issue: Oh Won, Duke Munmok (Adopted son)
- House: House of Yi (by birth); Haeju Oh clan (by marriage)
- Father: Hyeonjong of Joseon
- Mother: Queen Myeongseong of the Cheongpung Kim clan

Princess Myeongan (Korean: 명안공주; Hanja: 明安公主; 30 June 1665 – 25 June 1687), personal name Yi On-hui (이온희; 李溫姬), was a Korean princess as the third daughter of Hyeonjong of Joseon and Queen Myeongseong.

== Biography ==
On December 21, 1671 (12th year of her father's reign), Yi On-hui was honoured as Princess Myeongan (명안공주; 明安公主).

After the deaths of their two sisters in 1673, Princess Myeongan was the only surviving sister of the Crown Prince. It was said that their relationship was close as siblings.

In 1679 (5th year of Sukjong's reign), the 14-year-old Princess married the 11-year-old Oh Tae-ju (오태주), the third son of Oh Du-in (오두인; 1624–1689) from the Haeju Oh clan, who was a key figure of the Seoin faction. Her husband was honoured as Prince Consort Haechang (해창위; 海昌慰) and their formal wedding ceremony was held on December 18, 1680.

The drought being severe at that time, Song Si-yeol (송시열) and others filed an appeal requesting that the Princess's residence be built in a modest way to reduce the size and cost.

One year later, after the Princess's in-laws illegally occupied the mounds and fields in Deoksan, Chungcheong Province. A lawsuit broke out and the King ordered them to return the land.

Princess Myeongan died on June 25, 1687, five days from her birthday at the age of 21 years old, and is buried in Sasa-dong, Ansan, Gyeonggi Province, South Korea. It was reportedly said the King was saddened upon hearing her death.

A couple years after her death, her husband adopted his younger brother’s eldest son, Oh Won (오원), to continue their family line. Through their adopted son’s descendants, his great-granddaughter eventually became the first wife of Min Chi-rok, who was the father of Empress Myeongseong.

== Family ==
- Father: Hyeonjong of Joseon (조선 현종왕; 14 March 1641 – 17 September 1674)
- Mother: Queen Myeongseong of the Cheongpung Kim clan (명성왕후 김씨; 13 June 1642 – 21 January 1684)
- Siblings
  - Unnamed older sister (1658)
  - Older sister: Princess Myeongseon (명선공주; 15 November 1659 – 2 August 1673)
  - Older brother: Sukjong of Joseon (조선 숙종왕; 7 October 1661 – 12 July 1720)
  - Older sister: Princess Myeonghye (명혜공주; 1663 – 27 April 1673)
- Husband: Oh Tae-ju, Prince Consort Haechang (오태주 해창위; 1668–1716)
- Issue
  - Adoptive son: Oh Won, Duke Munmok (문목공 오원; 吳瑗; 1700–1740); eldest son of Oh Jin-ju (오진주; 吳晉周; 1680–1724)

== In popular culture ==
- Portrayed by Cho Ja-young in the 2013 SBS TV series Jang Ok-jung, Living by Love.
