= Hyeonjong =

Hyeonjong (현종) is the temple name of several Korean kings. It can refer to:

- Hyeonjong of Goryeo (1009–1031)
- Hyeonjong of Joseon (1659–1674)
