= Gisa Hwanguk =

1689 political purge in Korea

- Hangul: 기사환국
- Hanja: 己巳換局
- Revised Romanization: Gisa Hwanguk
- McCune–Reischauer: Kisa Hwan'guk

"Gisa Literati Purge"
- Hangul: 기사사화
- Hanja: 己巳士禍
- Revised Romanization: Gisa Sahwa
- McCune–Reischauer: Kisa Sahwa

The Gisa Hwanguk (Korean: 기사환국) occurred when the Westerners fell out of power after opposing the naming of a crown prince by Sukjong of Joseon. Prominent Westerner Song Si-yeol and others were executed. Shortly after, the Westerners split into Noron (Song's supporters within the Westerners) and Soron (Song's opponents within the Westerners).

== Background ==
In the late 17th century, the Westerners (Korean political faction) and Southerners (Korean political faction) were at odds in the political management of the ruling party. King Sukjong decided to abandon the previous system of party alliance and replace it frequently in order to stabilize his authority. In the beginning of King Sukjong's reign, the Southerners took the lead with the victory of the second Yesong. In response, the Westerners felt a sense of crisis as a political opponent of the Southerners, and the King Sukjong also had a sense of caution about the continuing rule of the Southerners. This was revealed in Hwanguk (the form of exchange party), including the Gyeongshin Hwanguk, Gisa Hwanguk, and Gapsul Hwanguk.
