= Lin Xiuzhen =

Lin Xiuzhen (林秀貞) is a human name, may refer to:

- Hayashi Hidesada (林 秀貞, 1513–1580), Japanese samurai and retainer of Oda clan
- Lim Su-jeong (taekwondo) (임수정, hanja: 林秀貞, born 1986), female South Korean taekwondo practitioner

== See also ==
- Hayashi
- Lim (disambiguation)
- Soo-jung
