= Kyŏngsin Famine =

1670–1671 famine in Korea

The Kyungshin, Kyŏngsin or Gyeongsin Famine (Korean: 경신대기근) took place from 1670 to 1671 during the reign of King Hyeonjong of the Joseon Dynasty. It was among the deadliest famines ever to strike Korea and its exceptional death toll stemmed from several interlocking causes.

The famine occurred at the coldest point of the Little Ice Age in Korea. In late February 1670 heavy snow and hail battered crops in Seoul; several days later Gyeongsang Province was struck by massive hailstones. By the time of the spring harvest and summer planting season in April, severe frost, hail, and snow struck every part of the kingdom killing most plants as they began to germinate. These cold shocks would continue until the summer harvest season in July, leaving the country dangerously short of food.

Korea was also struck by an unprecedented wave of earthquakes in 1670 which began during the first week of the year. The damage wrought by seismic activity exacerbated the problems caused by frost and drought. Weakened by hunger, many farmers were unable to resist epidemics which began to rage throughout the countryside. Human illness was accompanied and often preceded by outbreaks of Rinderpest which devastated livestock. The shortage of oxen and cattle would make spring plowing the following year even more difficult. These calamities were bracketed by an unprecedented array of celestial phenomena, beginning on New Years Day 1670, which included solar and lunar halos, comets and meteor showers, spreading panic throughout the nation, which considered them ill omens.

Without grain the peasantry began to devour their horses, cattle and dogs. Some were driven to such desperation by hunger that they unearthed the corpses of their erstwhile neighbors. Disease was rampant, and while many died of deadly plagues such as smallpox and measles, others weakened by hunger would perish from previously minor illnesses such as dysentery. The death toll from disease alone may have been higher than that inflicted by the Japanese invasions of the prior century.

In total around 100,000 people perished in 1671 with even more dying in 1670. Approximately 56,000 were stricken by illness including one fifth of Seoul's population. In total, 360 villages were afflicted by the famine, which was most deadly in the agriculturally productive south. In Gyeongsang Province, where records survive, at least 25% of the population was starving by May 1670, and in Jeolla province up to 54% of the population may have perished by the end of 1671. Estimates of the final death toll vary widely with scholars citing between 100,000 and one million dead, an unprecedented disaster. In total, scholars estimate that the Kyungshin famine and the Eulbyeong famine in the years 1695–1696 may have killed 23–33% of Korea's population. The countryside remained scarred by these calamities and population growth would remain depressed for most of the 18th century. At the time, the king offered titles and exemptions from military service to those willing to provide grain. The famine and its consequences seriously delegitimized the ruling Joseon Dynasty and would have consequences for years to come.

== See also ==
- Little Ice Age
