= Chae Sang-woo =

South Korean actor

- Born: March 31, 1999 (age 27); Cheorwon County, Gangwon Province, South Korea
- Education: Inha University
- Occupation: Actor
- Years active: 2008–2019; 2022–present
- Agent: Blossom Entertainment

Korean name
- Hangul: 채상우
- Hanja: 蔡相宇
- RR: Chae Sangu
- MR: Ch'ae Sangu

Chae Sang-woo (born March 31, 1999) is a South Korean actor. He began his acting career in 2008 as a child actor, notably in Deep Rooted Tree (2011).

== Filmography ==
=== Film ===
- Wretches (2018) - Jo Seong-woo
- The Huntresses (2014) - Sa-hyun
- The Face Reader (2013) - Danjong
- Wedding Dress (2010) - Min-woo

=== Television series ===
- Nokdu Flower (2019) - Yi Seong-gye [episode 41]
- Money Flower (2017) - young Jang Boo-cheon
- The Producers (2015) - young Ra Joon-mo
- Unkind Ladies (2015) - Gook Young-soo
- The Suspicious Housekeeper (2013) - Eun Du-gyeom
- The Eldest (2013) - young Park Soon-taek
- The Blade and Petal (2013)- young Yeon Choong
- Jang Ok-jung, Living by Love (SBS, 2013) - young Sukjong
- King of Ambition (2013)- young Ha Ryu / Cha Jae-woong
- Dream of the Emperor (2012) - young Gim Chunchu
- Insu, the Queen Mother (2011) - Danjong
- Deep Rooted Tree (2011) - young Kang Chae-yoon
- City Hunter (2011) - young Lee Yun-sung
- 49 Days (2011) - young Song Yi-soo
- Midas (2011) - young Kim Do-hyun
- More Charming by the Day (2010) - Kim Jun
- Father's House (2009) - Han Ban-do
- High Kick Through the Roof (2009, cameo) - Puppeteer addict
- Swallow the Sun (2009)
- Windy City (2008) - Phillip Jo
- My Sweet Seoul (2008) - Sedol
- Sweaty Martyr Tak-deok Choi Yang-eop (2008) - Woo-jung

=== Web series ===
- Revenge of Others (2022) - Gi Oh-sung

=== TV show ===
- New Country, Science Country (2009)

== Theater ==
- Dead Poets Society (Inha University, 2021)
