= Queen Ingyeong =

Queen of Joseon from 1674 to 1680

Queen Ingyeong 인경왕후

Queen consort of Joseon
- Tenure: 1674 – 16 December 1680
- Predecessor: Queen Myeongseong
- Successor: Queen Inhyeon

Crown Princess of Joseon
- Tenure: 1670–1674
- Predecessor: Crown Princess Kim
- Successor: Crown Princess Sim
- Born: 25 October 1661; Hoehyeonbang, Jung-gu, Hanseong, Joseon
- Died: 16 December 1680 (aged 19); Hoesangjeon Hall, Gyeongdeok Palace (now Gyeonghui Palace), Hanseong, Joseon
- Burial: Ikreung, Yongdu-dong, Deogyang-gu, Goyang, Gyeonggi Province
- Spouse: Yi Sun, King Sukjong (m.1670–1680)
- Issue: 2 unnamed daughters; Unnamed child
Posthumous name
- 혜성순의인경왕후; 惠聖純懿仁敬王后; 광렬효장명현선목혜성순의인경왕후; 光烈孝莊明顯宣穆惠聖純懿仁敬王后
- House: Gwangsan Kim clan (by birth); Jeonju Yi clan (by marriage)
- Father: Kim Man-Gi, Internal Prince Gwangseong
- Mother: Internal Princess Consort Seowon of the Cheongju Han clan

Queen Ingyeong (Korean: 인경왕후 김씨; 25 October 1661 − 16 December 1680), of the Gwangsan Kim clan, was a posthumous name bestowed to the wife and first queen consort of Yi Sun, King Sukjong, the 19th Joseon monarch. She was queen consort of Joseon from 1674 until her death in 1680.

== Biography ==
The future queen was born on 25 October 1661 during the reign of King Hyeonjong as the eldest daughter and middle child within her siblings. She was given the names, and was known as Kim Ok-hye (김옥혜; 金玉惠) or Kim Jin-ok (김진옥; 金盡玉).

Her father was Kim Man-gi and her mother was member of the Cheongju Han clan. Kim Jang-saeng was her great-great grandfather and Kim Jib was her great-granduncle through her father. She was a second cousin twice removed of Queen Inseon as well as a second cousin once removed of Queen Hyosun.

She was married at the age of 9 to Hyeonjong's only son, Crown Prince Myeongbo, entitling her as crown princess consort (왕세자빈, wangsejabin). With her husband, they were also 4th cousins as they shared King Seonjo as their great-great-great-grandfather. In 1674, her husband ascended to the throne as the 19th Joseon monarch (temple name: Sukjong) and she became queen consort.

In 1677, she gave birth to a daughter who eventually died a year later on 13 March 1678. In 1679, the Queen gave birth to another daughter but she died prematurely a day later. In the summer of 1680, she had been pregnant, but due to an incident she had a miscarriage.

On 8 December 1680, age 19, she showed signs of smallpox and later died on December 16 in Gyeongdeok Palace (now known as Gyeonghui Palace). She is buried in Ikreung (익릉) in Gyeonggi province.

== Family ==
- Father
  - Kim Man-gi (김만기, 金萬基; 1633 – 15 March 1687)
- Mother
  - Internal Princess Consort Seowon of the Cheongju Han clan (서원부부인 청주 한씨; 西原府夫人 淸州 韓氏; 1634–1720)
- Siblings
  - Older brother - Kim Jin-gu (김진구; 金鎭龜; 1651–1704)
  - Older brother - Kim Jin-gyu (김진규; 金鎭圭; 1658–1716)
  - Older brother - Kim Jin-bu (김진부; 金鎭符; 1660–1693)
  - Younger brother - Kim Jin-seo (김진서; 金鎭瑞; 1663–1712)
  - Younger sister - Kim Han-hye (김한혜; 金漢惠), Lady Kim of the Gwangsan Kim clan (1664–?)
  - Younger sister - Kim Bok-hye (김복혜; 金福惠), Lady Kim of the Gwangsan Kim clan (1668–?)
- Husband − Yi Sun, King Sukjong (조선 숙종; 7 October 1661 – 12 July 1720)
  - Unnamed daughter (27 April 1677 – 13 March 1678)
  - Unnamed daughter (23 October 1679 – 24 October 1679)
  - Unnamed child (22 July 1680); miscarriage

== Full posthumous name ==
- Queen Ingyeong, Gwangryeol Hyojang Myeonghyeon Seonmok Hyeseong Sunui
- 광렬효장명현선목혜성순의인경왕후
- 光烈孝莊明顯宣穆惠聖純懿仁敬王后

== In popular culture ==
- Portrayed by Ju Jeung-ryu in the 1961 film Jang Hui-bin.
- Portrayed by Park Soon-chun in the 1988 MBC TV series 500 Years of Joseon: Queen Inhyeon.
- Portrayed by Sa Mi-jan and Jang Hye-sook in the 1995 SBS TV series Jang Hee Bin.
- Portrayed by Kim Ha-eun in the 2013 SBS TV series Jang Ok-jung, Living by Love.

Queen Ingyeong Kim clan
Royal titles
Preceded by Queen Myeongseong of the Cheongpung Kim clan	Queen consort of Joseon; 1674–1680	Succeeded by Queen Inhyeon of the Yeoheung Min clan
