= Royal Story: Jang Hui-bin =

- Genre: Historical
- Created by: Uhm Ki-baek
- Written by: Kim Sun-young → Kang Tae-wan
- Directed by: Lee Young-kook; Han Chul-kyung
- Creative directors: Kang Byung-taek; Park Sung-soo
- Starring: Kim Hye-soo; Park Sun-young; Jun Kwang-ryul
- Narrated by: Kim Jong-sung
- Ending theme: "Love For You" by Kim Dong-kyoo
- Country of origin: South Korea
- Original language: Korean
- No. of seasons: 1
- No. of episodes: 100

Production
- Executive producer: Lee Nok-young
- Producer: Kim Young-jin
- Production companies: Estars Company; Chorokbaem Media

Original release
- Network: KBS2
- Release: November 6, 2002 – October 23, 2003

Royal Story: Jang Hui-bin (Korean: 장희빈; Hanja: 張禧嬪) is a 2002–2003 South Korean television series starring Kim Hye-soo in the title role. It aired on KBS2 from November 6, 2002, until October 23, 2003, every Wednesdays and Thursday at 21:55 (KST) for 100 episodes. It was also aired every Mondays to Fridays at SmileTV Plus. At first, the role of Jang Hui-bin was offered to Shim Eun-ha, Lee Young-ae, Kim Hee-sun, Song Yoon-ah, Kang Soo-yeon, Chae Shi-ra, or Kim Hyun-joo, but due to the episode issue, the role finally given to Kim Hye-soo.

== Synopsis ==
This is a story that set during the mid-Joseon dynasty periods about the life of Royal Noble Consort 'Huibin' Jang, Queen Inhyeon, King Sukjong.

Jang, a young lady-in-waiting who catches the eye of the King with her beauty and becomes his favoured concubine. Quickly getting promoted and eventually giving birth to a son, her hunger for power drives her not only to maintain her position, but also in becoming queen, even if that means deposing the king's legal wife.

== Cast ==
Royal Family

- Kim Hye-soo as Lady Jang Hui-bin
- Jun Kwang-ryul as King Sukjong
- Park Sun-young as Queen Inhyeon
- Park Ye-jin as Lady Choi Suk-bin
- Cho Yeo-jeong as Lady Kim Gwi-in
- Kang Boo-ja as Queen Jangnyeol, Sukjong's great-grandmother
- Kim Young-ae as Queen Myeongseong, Sukjong's mother
- Park Young-tae as King Hyeonjong, Sukjong's father
- Lee Seung-hyung as Crown Prince Lee Gyun, Sukjong and Huibin's son
  - Kwak Jung-wook as young Crown Prince Lee Gyun
- Park Ji-mi as the Crown Princess, Gyun's wife
- Lee Tae-ri as Prince Yeoning, Sukjong and Sukbin's son
- Kim Young-ran as Princess Sookan, Sukjong's aunt
- Yu In-chon as Lee Hang the Prince Dongpyeong, Sukjong's half uncle
- Uhm Yoo-shin as Lady Shin the Princess Consort Soongsun, Hang's mother
- Song Yong-tae as Lee Nam the Prince Bokseon, Sukjong's uncle

People around Jang Huibin

- Jung Sung-mo as Jang Hee-jae, Huibin's older brother
- Lee Bo-hee as Lady Yoon, Huibin and Heejae's mother
- Ha Da-som as Lady Jageunagi, Heejae's wife
- Ha Yoo-mi as 'Gisaeng' Sookjung, Heejae's concubine
- Kang Min-suk as Eop-dong
- Lee Hye-geun as Eop-yi

People in Naemyeongbu

- Kim Ji-yoon as Court Lady Han, Queen Inhyeon's servant before deposed
- Lee Kyung-pyo as Court Lady Choi, Queen Inhyeon's servant after deposed
- Jo Eun-deok as Court Lady Park, Sukjong's servant
- Kim Eul-dong as Court Lady Kwon, Huibin's servant
- Kwak Jin-young as Si-young, Huibin's maid
- Kim Ga-yeon as Ja-kyung, Huibin's maid
- Yang Rin as Ja-sun, Huibin's maid
- ? as Seol-hyang, Huibin's maid
- Shin Chae-yeon as Kang-yi, Gwiin's maid
- Kim Hye-jung as Court Lady Park, Sukbin's servant
- Kim Hye-kyung as Ah-ji, Sukbin's maid

Others

- Lee Soon-jae as Song Shi-yeol
- Choi Sang-hoon as Nam Goo-man
- Baek Yoon-shik as Jo Sa-seok, Queen Jangnyeol's cousin
- Shin Choong-shik as Kim Man-joong
- Song Il-kook as Kim Choon-taek
- Song Jae-ho as Min Yoo-joong, Queen Inhyeon's father
- Kim Myung-soo as Min Jin-hoo, Queen Inhyeon's older brother
- Kim Seok-ok as Lady Jo, Queen Inhyeon's mother
- Lee Young-hoo as Kim Soo-hang
- Jeon In-taek as Kim Seok-joo, Queen Myeongseong's cousin
- Lee Kwang-gi as Hong Chi-sang, Princess Sookan's son
- Park Young-ji as Choi Sang-ang
- Kang Man-hee as Choi Hyo-won, Sukbin's father
- Lee Sung-ryong as Kim Chang-jip
- Kim Mi-sung as Sam-wol
- Lee Doo-seop as Eunuch Lee, Sukjong's servant
- Kim Hak-chul as Min Jang-do
- Choi Woon-gyo as Park Doo-kyung
- Na Han-il as Kim Ik-hoon
- Han In-soo as Min-am
- Park Sang-jo as Mok Nae-sun
- Lee Gye-young as Mok Chang-myun
- Kim Hyung-il as Min Eon-ryang
- Lee Shin-jae as Kwon Dae-woon
- Yoo Seung-bong as Kim Deok-won
- Shin Dong-hoon as Min Jong-do
- Maeng Ho-rim as Park Se-chae
- Lee Dong-joo as Yoon Ji-wan
- Min Wook as Choi Seok-jung
- Jeon Hyun as Kim Tae-yoon
- Yang Jae-won as Park Joon-sung
- Seo Dong-soo as Ok Sa-jang
- Oh Sung-yeol as Han Joong-hyuk
- Kim Dong-seok as Lee Shi-hoi
- Kim Tae-hyung as Lee Mong
- Han Beom-hee as Jo Tae-chae
- Park Joon-geum as Lady Park the Princess Consort Youngwon, Queen Danui's mother
- Kim Myung-hee as a shaman
- Jung Jin-gak as Jung-gang
- Heo Hyun-ho as Qing's officer
- Kim Dae-hwan as Qing's official
- Jo Byung-gon as Qing's general

== Awards ==
Kim Hye-soo won 2003 KBS Drama Awards "Grand Prize (Daesang)".
