= Jang Ok-jung, Living by Love =

South Korean historical television series

- Promotional poster
- Also known as: Jang Ok-jung, Live for Love; Jang Ok-jung, Living in Love; Jang Ok-jung, Lives in Love
- Hangul: 장옥정, 사랑에 살다
- RR: Jang Okjeong, sarange salda
- MR: Chang Okchŏng, sarange salda
- Genre: Historical; Romance
- Based on: Jang Hui-bin, Living by Love by Choi Jung-mi
- Written by: Choi Jung-mi
- Directed by: Boo Sung-chul
- Starring: Kim Tae-hee; Yoo Ah-in; Hong Soo-hyun; Jae Hee
- Ending theme: "비가" by Yim Jae-beom
- Composers: Kim Jun-seok; Jung Se-rin
- Country of origin: South Korea
- Original language: Korean
- No. of episodes: 24

Production
- Executive producer: Lee Hyun-jik
- Producers: Kim Jin-geun; Lee Sung-hoon
- Production location: Korea
- Cinematography: Lee Young-cheol; Jang Sang-il
- Editor: Kim Yoo-mi
- Running time: 60 minutes
- Production company: Story TV

Original release
- Network: SBS TV
- Release: April 8 – June 25, 2013

Jang Ok-jung, Living by Love (Korean: 장옥정, 사랑에 살다) is a 2013 South Korean historical television series, starring Kim Tae-hee, Yoo Ah-in, Hong Soo-hyun and Jae Hee. Based on the 2008 novel by Choi Jung-mi, it is a reinterpretation of Jang Hui-bin's life, as a woman involved in fashion design and cosmetics-making in the Joseon period.

It aired on SBS from April 8 to June 25, 2013, on Mondays and Tuesdays at 21:55 for 24 episodes.

== Cast ==
=== Main ===
- Kim Tae-hee as Jang Ok-jung, later the concubine, Jang Hui-bin
  - Kang Min-ah as young Jang Ok-jung
- Yoo Ah-in as Lee Soon, later King Sukjong
  - Chae Sang-woo as young Lee Soon
- Hong Soo-hyun as Queen Inhyeon
- Jae Hee as Hyun Chi-soo
  - Baek Su-ho as young Hyun Chi-soo
- Lee Sang-yeob as Lee Hoon, later Prince Dongpyeong
  - Kwak Dong-yeon as young Lee Hoon
- Han Seung-yeon as Choi Sui Chee Musuri, later Choi Suk-bin

=== Supporting ===
- Sung Dong-il as Jang Hyun
- Lee Hyo-jung - Min Yoo-joong
- Kim Seo-ra as Lady Yoon, Ok-jung's mother
- Go Young-bin as Jang Hee-jae
  - Lee Ji-oh as young Jang Hee-jae
- Jeon In-taek as King Hyeonjong
- Kim Sun-kyung as Queen Myeongseong
- Lee Hyo-chun as Queen Jangnyeol
- Ah Young as Princess Myeongan
- Lee Dong-shin as Kim Man-ki
- Kim Ha-eun as Queen Ingyeong
- Yoon Yoo-sun as Lady Kang
- Jang Young-nam as Court lady Cheon
- Ji Yoo as Ja-kyeong
  - Kim Min-ha as young Ja-kyeong
- Choi Sang-hoon as Jo Sa-seok
- Ra Mi-ran as Jo Sa-seok's wife
- Lee Hyung-chul as Prince Boksun
- Bae Jin-seob as Hyun-moo
- Lee Gun-joo as Eunuch Yang
- Kim Ga-eun as Hyang-yi
  - Song Soo-hyun as young Hyang-yi
- Lee Hyo-rim as Seol-hyang
- Kim Se-in as Jung Hon-ja, northern village woman
- Kim Nan-joo as Court lady Choi
- Min Ji-ah as Hong-joo
- Yoo Sa-ra as Sol-bi
- Lee Ja-min as Yeon-hong
- Kim Soon-tae as Ui-kwan
- Lee Sa-rang as Shaman Oh-rye
- Ha Shi-eun as Shi-young
- Jang Young-joo as palace maid
- Choi Ye-ji as stepdaughter

== Production ==
The series was written by Choi Jung-mi, based on her 2008 novel Jang Hui-bin, Living by Love. It was directed by Boo Sung-chul, who previously helmed the SBS dramas My Girlfriend is a Gumiho (2010) and Star's Lover (2009).

Yoo Ah-in's casting was announced on January 22, 2013. This is his third historical drama following Strongest Chil Woo in 2008 and Sungkyunkwan Scandal in 2010, both on KBS. The producers took into consideration the historical fact that Sukjong was younger than Jang Ok-jung, hence it made sense to cast Yoo who is five years younger than Kim Tae-hee. Yoo said "I didn't want to miss the chance to play this character. There are analogies between the character and me, so I have an affinity with the role even though everyone tried to dissuade me from taking it."

The cast and production attended their first script reading on February 1, 2013.

== Ratings ==
In the tables below, the blue numbers represent the lowest ratings and the red numbers represent the highest ratings.

| Ep. | Original broadcast date | Average audience share | | | |
| Ep. | Original broadcast date | TNmS | | AGB Nielsen | |
| Ep. | Original broadcast date | Nationwide | Seoul | Nationwide | Seoul |
|---|---|---|---|---|---|
| 1 | April 8, 2013 | 11.3% (11th) | 12.9% (7th) | 11.3% (8th) | 12.8% (5th) |
| 2 | April 9, 2013 | 9.1% (17th) | 10.6% (10th) | 9.1% (15th) | 10.0% (11th) |
| 3 | April 15, 2013 | NR | 9.6% (13th) | NR | NR |
| 4 | April 16, 2013 | 7.3% (20th) | 8.7% (17th) | NR | NR |
| 5 | April 22, 2013 | NR | 9.5% (11th) | NR | NR |
| 6 | April 23, 2013 | 8.3% (20th) | 9.7% (12th) | NR | NR |
| 7 | April 29, 2013 | 8.2% (19th) | 9.6% (13th) | 8.2% (19th) | 8.7% (17th) |
| 8 | April 30, 2013 | 8.1% (18th) | 9.7% (9th) | 7.8% (16th) | 7.8% (19th) |
| 9 | May 6, 2013 | 9.1% (15th) | 10.8% (8th) | 9.3% (16th) | 9.7% (15th) |
| 10 | May 7, 2013 | 9.3% (12th) | 11.2% (7th) | 8.0% (15th) | 7.7% (18th) |
| 11 | May 13, 2013 | 9.6% (14th) | 11.5% (7th) | 9.2% (17th) | 9.3% (17th) |
| 12 | May 14, 2013 | 10.0% (11th) | 11.7% (6th) | 9.3% (13th) | 9.0% (15th) |
| 13 | May 20, 2013 | 9.7% (13th) | 12.3% (6th) | 9.6% (14th) | 9.4% (16th) |
| 14 | May 21, 2013 | 11.1% (6th) | 13.5% (5th) | 9.2% (10th) | 8.9% (12th) |
| 15 | May 27, 2013 | 11.6% (8th) | 13.2% (4th) | 11.1% (10th) | 10.8% (13th) |
| 16 | May 28, 2013 | 11.3% (10th) | 13.0% (5th) | 10.5% (10th) | 10.0% (13th) |
| 17 | June 3, 2013 | 12.2% (5th) | 14.2% (5th) | 11.4% (5th) | 11.2% (6th) |
| 18 | June 4, 2013 | 11.7% (6th) | 14.1% (5th) | 11.3% (6th) | 10.9% (6th) |
| 19 | June 10, 2013 | 10.7% (8th) | 11.6% (5th) | 11.0% (7th) | 10.5% (7th) |
| 20 | June 11, 2013 | 9.8% (16th) | 11.5% (9th) | 10.0% (14th) | 9.3% (17th) |
| 21 | June 17, 2013 | 9.5% (15th) | 10.1% (13th) | 10.2% (11th) | 9.9% (13th) |
| 22 | June 18, 2013 | 8.8% (18th) | 10.0% (13th) | 9.9% (16th) | 9.9% (17th) |
| 23 | June 24, 2013 | 9.5% (10th) | 10.4% (9th) | 9.0% (14th) | 8.2% (19th) |
| 24 | June 25, 2013 | 10.3% (8th) | 12.3% (5th) | 10.3% (9th) | 9.7% (14th) |

== Awards and nominations ==
| Year | Award | Category | Recipient | Result |
|---|---|---|---|---|
| 2013 | 2nd APAN Star Awards | Acting Award, Actress | Jang Young-nam | Nominated |
| 2013 | 2nd APAN Star Awards | Best New Actor | Lee Sang-yeob | Nominated |
| 2013 | SBS Drama Awards | Excellence Award, Actor in a Mid-length Drama | Yoo Ah-in | Nominated |
| 2013 | SBS Drama Awards | Excellence Award, Actor in a Mid-length Drama | Sung Dong-il | Won |
| 2013 | SBS Drama Awards | Excellence Award, Actress in a Mid-length Drama | Kim Tae-hee | Nominated |
| 2013 | SBS Drama Awards | Special Acting Award, Actor in a Mid-length Drama | Lee Hyo-jung | Won |
| 2013 | SBS Drama Awards | Best Couple Award | Yoo Ah-in & Kim Tae-hee | Nominated |

== International broadcast ==
| Country | TV Network | Series Premiere | Alternate title |
|---|---|---|---|
| Myanmar | MRTV-4 | Sep 23, 2020 | နန်းထိုက်သည့် တော်ဝင်ပန်းတစ်ပွင့် |
| Thailand | Channel 3 | May 17, 2016 | จางอ๊กจอง ตำนานรักคู่บัลลังก์ |
| Cambodia | CTV8 HD | Aug 24, 2015 | វាសនាអ្នកម្នាងអ៊ីជិន |
| Vietnam | Let's Viet (VTC9) | July 19, 2014 | Tình sử Jang Ok Jung |
