= Princess Myeongseon =

Korean princess (1659–1673)

Princess Myeongseon 명선공주
- Princess of Joseon
- Born: 28 December 1659; Joseon
- Died: 12 September 1673 (aged 14); Joseon
- Burial: Taepyeong-dong, Sujeong District, Seongnam, Gyeonggi Province, South Korea
- House: House of Yi
- Father: Hyeonjong of Joseon
- Mother: Queen Myeongseong of the Cheongpung Kim clan

Princess Myeongseon (Korean: 명선공주; Hanja: 明善公主; 28 December 1659 – 12 September 1673) was a Korean princess as the oldest child of Hyeonjong of Joseon and Queen Myeongseong. She was the oldest-surviving sister of Sukjong of Joseon.

== Biography ==
In 1669, an envoy from Beijing (Qing Dynasty) returned with silver and silk. When her father King Hyeonjong gave it to her, he was ashamed after Song Jun-gil (송준길) told him not to use what he obtained publicly.

In 1673, the 14th year of her father's reign, she was arranged to marry Maeng Man-taek (맹만택), son of Maeng Ju-seo (맹주서), but before the formal marriage ceremony were to happen, the Princess showed symptoms of smallpox and was moved to Gyeongdeok Palace (경덕궁). She died on August 2, 1673, when she was 14 years old. Her tomb is located in Taepyeong-dong, Sujeong District, Seongnam, Gyeonggi Province, South Korea.
