= Sukjong of Joseon =

King of Joseon from 1674 to 1720

Sukjong
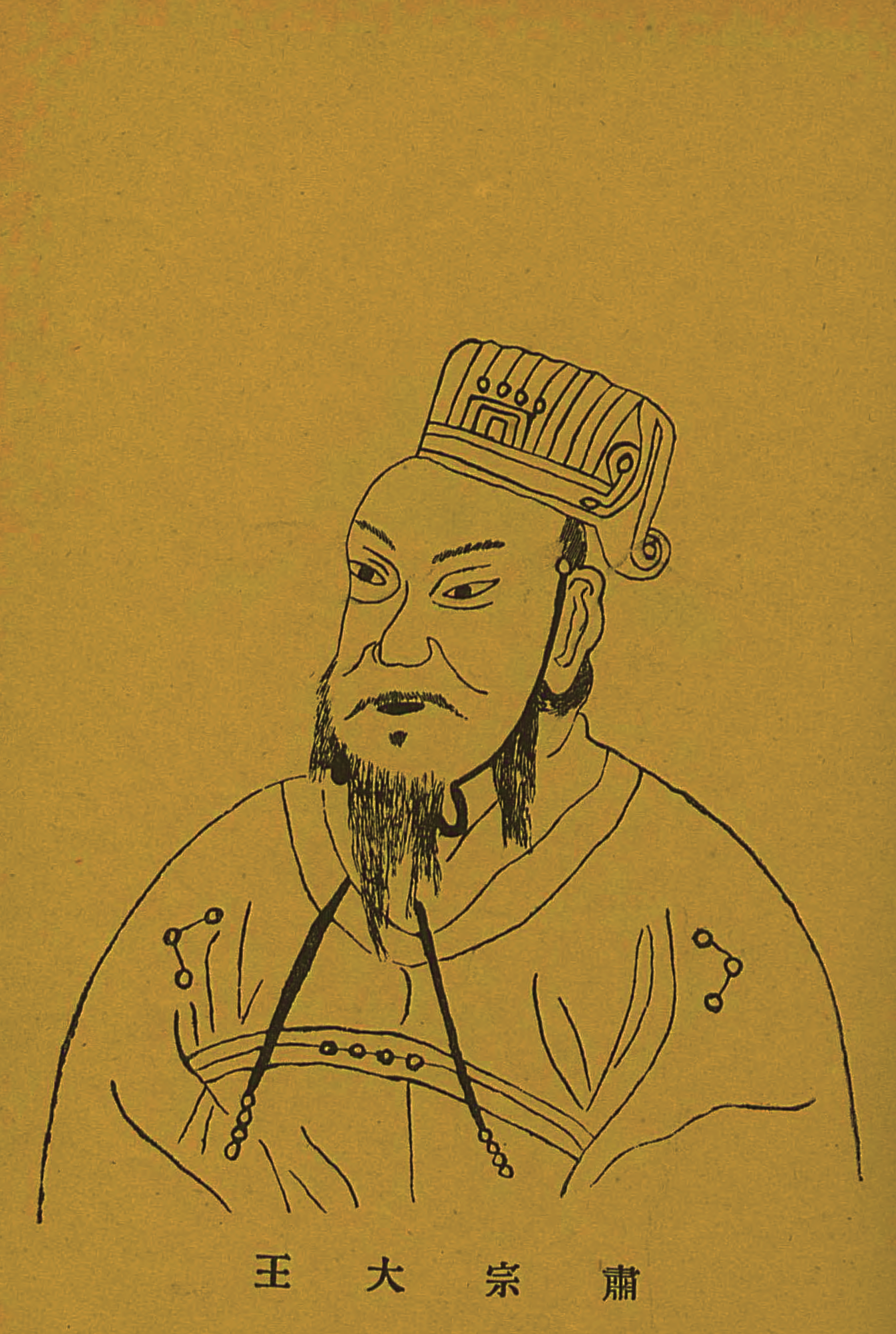
- Reproduction of a portrait, c. 1926

King of Joseon
- Reign: 17 September 1674 – 12 July 1720
- Enthronement: 22 September 1674; Injeongjeon, Changdeokgung
- Predecessor: Hyeonjong
- Successor: Gyeongjong
- Regent: Crown Prince Yun (1717–1720)

Crown Prince of Joseon
- Tenure: 13 February 1667 – 17 September 1674
- Predecessor: Crown Prince Yeon
- Successor: Crown Prince Yun
- Born: Yi Gwang (이광; 李爌); 7 October 1661; Hoesangjeon, Gyeonghuigung, Hanseong, Joseon
- Died: 12 July 1720 (aged 58); Yungbokjeon, Gyeonghuigung, Hanseong, Joseon
- Burial: Myeongneung, Seooreung Cluster, Goyang, South Korea
- Spouses: Queen Ingyeong (m. 1671; died 1680) Queen Inhyeon (m. 1681; dep. 1689) (m. 1694; died 1701) Queen Jang (m. 1690–1694) Queen Inwon (m. 1702)
- Issue Detail: Gyeongjong of Joseon; Yeongjo of Joseon; Prince Yeollyeong
Names
- Yi Sun (이순; 李焞)
Era dates
- Adopted the era name of the Qing dynasty (Note: Ganghui (Kangxi) (강희; 康熙): 1674–1720)
Regnal name
- Hyeonui Gwangryun Yeseong Yeongnyeol Yumo Yeongun Hongin Jundeok Baecheon Hapdo Gyehyu Doggyeong Jeongjung Hyeobgeuk Sinui Daehun (현의광륜예성영렬유모영운홍인준덕배천합도계휴독경정중협극신의대훈; 顯義光倫睿聖英烈裕謨永運洪仁峻德配天合道啓休篤慶正中恊極神毅大勳) (Note: Known as honorific name (존호; 尊號) in the Sinosphere, its closest equivalent in the English-speaking world is the regnal name.)
Posthumous name
- Joseon: Great King Huisun Jangmun Heonmu Gyeongmyeong Wonhyo (희순장문헌무경명원효대왕; 僖順章文憲武敬明元孝大王); Qing dynasty: Huisun (희순; 僖順)
Temple name
- Sukjong (숙종; 肅宗)
- Clan: Jeonju Yi
- Dynasty: Yi
- Father: King Hyeonjong
- Mother: Queen Myeongseong
- Religion: Confucianism (Neo-Confucianism)

Korean name
- Hangul: 숙종
- Hanja: 肅宗
- Lit.: "Venerable Ancestor"
- RR: Sukjong
- MR: Sukchong

Courtesy name
- Hangul: 명보
- Hanja: 明普
- RR: Myeongbo
- MR: Myŏngbo

Childhood name
- Hangul: 용상
- Hanja: 龍祥
- RR: Yongsang
- MR: Yongsang

Sukjong (Korean: 숙종; Hanja: 肅宗; 7 October 1661 – 12 July 1720), (Note: In the Korean calendar (lunisolar), he was born on the 15th day of the 8th lunar month and died on the 8th day of the 6th lunar month.) personal name Yi Gwang, later changed to Yi Sun, was the 19th monarch of Joseon. He acceded to the throne at the age of 12, upon the death of his father, King Hyeonjong. A skilled legislator, he reduced the influence of the scholar-officials and stregthened royal authority by alternating his support between the Namin (Southerners), Seoin (Westerners), Soron and Noron political factions.

== Biography ==
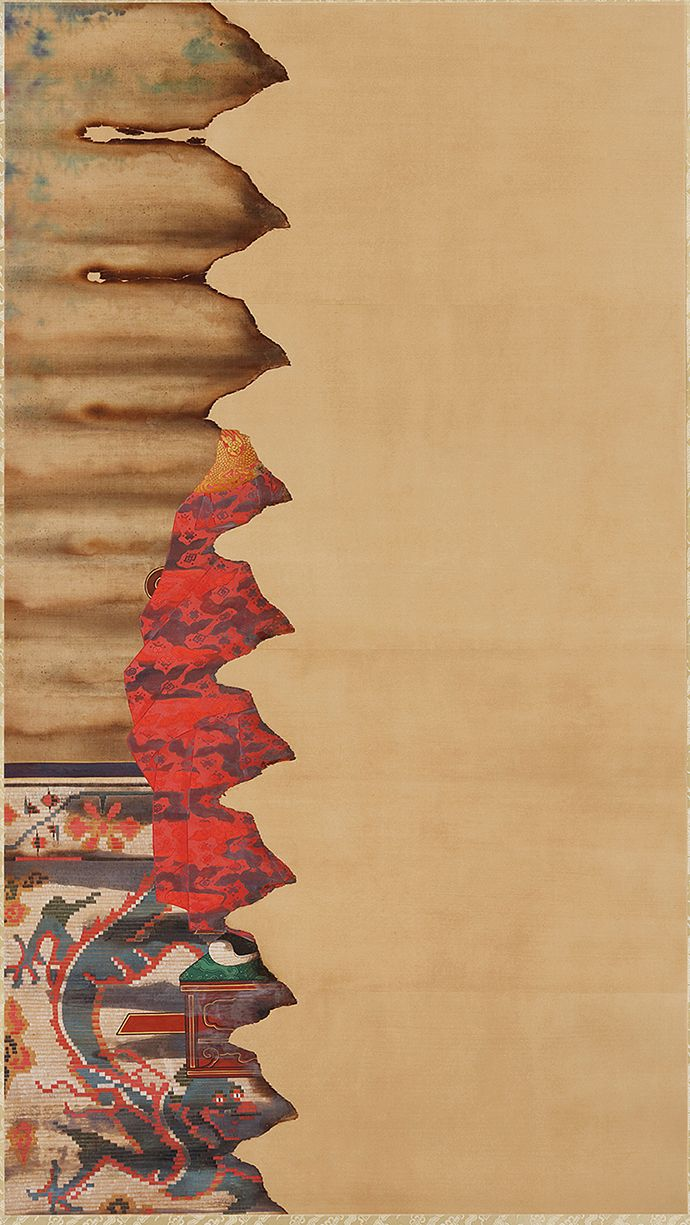
Portrait of Sukjong, heavily damaged in the 1954 Busan fire

King Sukjong was born on October 7, 1661, to King Hyeonjong and Queen Myeongseong at Gyeonghuigung.

During his reign, King Sukjong was actively involved in state politics, resulting in his reign containing some of the most intense factional fights in the Joseon dynasty. Sukjong frequently replaced factions in power in order to strengthen the authority of the throne. With each change in government, known as hwanguk (환국; 換局), literally "change/switching of the state", the deposed faction was completely driven out of politics by exile or execution. Despite the turbulent changes of government, his reign did not significantly affect the general populace, and so this period is considered one of the more prosperous times in the Joseon dynasty.

=== Factional struggles ===
In the early years of Sukjong's reign, the Southern faction and Western faction clashed over the Royal Funeral Dispute, a seemingly minor issue regarding the mourning period for Queen Insun. The Southern faction claimed that the mourning period should last one year while the Western faction argued for a nine-month mourning period. A one-year mourning period meant that Hyojong of Joseon was considered the eldest son while 9-month period would suggest that Hyojong was considered not the eldest son, following the rules that governed the yangban class. In other words, the Western faction viewed the royal family as the first of the yangban class rather than a separate class for which different rules applied. The two factions were also in conflict over the issue of fighting the Qing dynasty, which was considered a barbaric country (as opposed to the Ming dynasty) that threatened Joseon's national security. The Southern faction, led by Heo Jeok and Yun Hyu, supported war against Qing while Western factions wanted to focus first on improving domestic conditions.

Sukjong at first sided with the Southern faction, but in 1680, Heo Jeok was accused of treason by Western faction, which led to the execution of Heo Jeok and Yun Hyu and purging of the Southern faction. This incident is called Gyeongsin Hwanguk. Once in power, the Western faction split into the Noron (Old Learning) faction, led by Song Si-yeol, and the Soron (New Learning) faction, led by Yun Jeung. After nine years in power, the Noron collapsed when Sukjong deposed Queen Min (posthumously called Queen Inhyeon), who was supported by the Western faction, and named Consort Jang as the new queen. She is widely thought to be one of the most beautiful women of Joseon, she was the only person recorded in Annals for her beautiful features. The Western faction angered Sukjong when it opposed the naming of Consort Jang's son as crown prince. The Southern faction, who supported Consort Jang and her son, regained power and drove out Western faction, executing Song Si-yeol in revenge. This is called Gisa Hwanguk (기사환국).

Five years later in 1694, as the Southern faction planned another purge of the Western faction, accusing them of conspiracy to reinstate the deposed Queen, Sukjong began to regret deposing Queen Min and favored Consort Choe, an ally of the Queen and the Noron faction. Angry with the Southern faction's attempt to purge Westerners, Sukjong abruptly turned around to purge Southerners and brought the Western faction back to power. The Southern faction would never recover from this blow, also called Gapsul Hwanguk (갑술환국). Sukjong demoted Queen Jang to her previous title (Jang Hui-bin) and reinstated Queen Min. Consort Jang was eventually executed by poison for cursing the Queen. The Soron faction supported Crown Prince Yi Yun, Consort Jang's son, while the Noron faction supported Consort Choe's son, Prince Yeoning (Yi Geum), later to become Yeongjo of Joseon. The late Queen Inhyeon and the newly installed Queen Kim (posthumously known as Queen Inwon) were both childless.

In 1718, Sukjong allowed the crown prince, soon to be Gyeongjong of Joseon, to rule as regent. Sukjong died in 1720 supposedly after telling Yi Yi-myoung to name Prince Yeoning as Gyeongjong's heir — in absence of a historiographer or recorder. This would lead to yet another purge in which four Noron leaders were executed in 1721, followed by another purge with the executions of eight Noron members in 1722.

Sukjong's accomplishments include tax reform (大同法), the creation of a new monetary system and currency (Korean mun), and the liberalization of civil service rules promoting the middle class and children of concubines into higher-ranking regional government positions.

In 1712, Sukjong's government worked with the Qing dynasty in China to define national borders between the two countries at the Yalu and Tumen rivers. The Japanese government recognized Ulleung Island as Joseon's territory in 1696 (the South Korean government insists that Liancourt Rocks was also recognized, while the Japanese government disagrees).

Sukjong's reign also saw agricultural development in remote provinces and increased cultural activity including publishing. He died after reigning for 46 years in 1720 at age 60. He was buried in Myeongneung (명릉) in Goyang, Gyeonggi Province, inside the Five Western Royal Tombs (서오릉, 西五陵; Seooneung).

== Family ==
- Father: King Hyeonjong (현종대왕; 14 March 1641 – 17 September 1674)
  - Grandfather: King Hyojong (효종대왕; 3 July 1619 – 23 June 1659)
  - Grandmother: Queen Inseon (인선왕후), of the Deoksu Jang clan (덕수 장씨; 9 February 1619 – 30 March 1674)
- Mother: Queen Myeongseong (명성왕후), of the Cheongpung Kim clan (청풍 김씨; 3 June 1642 – 11 January 1684)
  - Grandfather: Kim U-myeong (김우명), Internal Prince Cheongpung (청풍부원군; 1619–1675)
  - Grandmother: Internal Princess Consort Deokeun (덕은부부인), of the Eunjin Song clan (은진 송씨; 1621–1660)

Consort(s) and their respective issue

- Queen Ingyeong (인경왕후), of the Gwangsan Kim clan (광산 김씨; 25 October 1661 – 16 December 1680)
  - Unnamed daughter (27 April 1677 – 13 March 1678)
  - Unnamed daughter (1679)
  - Miscarriage (1680)
- Queen Inhyeon (인현왕후), of the Yeoheung Min clan (여흥 민씨; 15 May 1667 – 16 September 1701)
- Queen Inwon (인원왕후), of the Gyeongju Kim clan (경주 김씨; 3 November 1687 – 13 May 1757)
- Concubine Hui (희빈), of the Indong Jang clan (인동 장씨; 3 November 1659 – 9 November 1701), given name Ok-jeong (옥정)
  - Yi Yun (이윤), King Gyeongjong (경종대왕; 20 November 1688 – 11 October 1724), first son
  - Unnamed son (23 August – 17 October 1690) (Note: His childhood name was Seong-su (성수).)
- Concubine Suk (숙빈), of the Haeju Choe clan (해주 최씨; 17 December 1670 – 9 April 1718)
  - Unnamed son (3 November 1693 – 14 January 1694) (Note: His childhood name was Yeong-su (영수).)
  - Yi Geum (이금), King Yeongjo (영조대왕; 31 October 1694 – 22 April 1776), second son
  - Unnamed son (1698)
- Concubine Myeong (명빈), of the Miryang Park clan (밀양 박씨; ? – 27 August 1703)
  - Yi Hwon (이훤), Prince Yeollyeong (연령군; 9 July 1699 – 13 November 1719), third son
- Concubine Yeong (영빈), of the (new) Andong Kim clan (신 안동 김씨; 1669 – 4 February 1735)
- Gwiin (귀인), of the Gyeongju Kim clan (경주 김씨; 8 April 1690 – 14 September 1735)
- Soui (소의), of the Gangneung Yu clan (강릉 유씨; ? – 9 May 1707)

== Ancestry ==
Ancestors of Sukjong of Joseon

King Wonjong (원종대왕)
King Injo (인조대왕)
Queen Inheon, of the Neungseong Gu clan (인헌왕후 능성 구씨)
King Hyojong (효종대왕)
Han Jun-gyeom, Internal Prince Seopyeong (서평부원군 한준겸)
Queen Inyeol, of the Cheongju Han clan (인렬왕후 청주 한씨)
Internal Princess Consort Hoesan, of the Changwon Hwang clan (회산부부인 창원 황씨)
King Hyeonjong (현종대왕)
Jang Un-ik (장운익)
Jang Yu, Internal Prince Sinpung (신풍부원군 장유)
Lady, of the Miryang Park clan (밀양 박씨)
Queen Inseon, of the Deoksu Jang clan (인선왕후 덕수 장씨)
Kim Sang-yong (김상용)
Internal Princess Consort Yeongga, of the (new) Andong Kim clan (영가부부인 신 안동 김씨)
Lady, of the Andong Gwon clan (안동 권씨)
King Sukjong
Kim Heung-u (김흥우)
Kim Yuk (김육)
Lady, of the Hanyang Jo clan (한양 조씨)
Kim U-myeong, Internal Prince Cheongpung (청풍부원군 김우명)
Yun Geub (윤급)
Lady, of the Papyeong Yun clan (파평 윤씨)
Queen Myeongseong, of the Cheongpung Kim clan (명성왕후 청풍 김씨)
Song Guk-taek (송국택)
Internal Princess Consort Deokeun, of the Eunjin Song clan (덕은부부인 은진 송씨)
Lady, of the Jinju Gang clan (진주 강씨)

== In popular culture ==
- Portrayed by Kim Jin-kyu in the 1961 film Jang Hui-bin.
- Portrayed by Shin Seong-il in the 1968 film Femme Fatale, Jang Hee-bin.
- Portrayed by Park Geun-hyung in the 1971 MBC TV series Jang Hui-bin and the 1981 MBC TV series Women of History: Jang Hui-bin.
- Portrayed by Kang Seok-woo in the 1988 MBC TV series 500 Years of Joseon: Queen Inhyeon.
- Portrayed by Im Ho in the 1995 SBS TV series Jang Hui-bin.
- Portrayed by Jun Kwang-ryul in the 2002–2003 KBS2 TV series Royal Story: Jang Hui-bin.
- Portrayed by Ji Jin-hee in the 2010 MBC TV series Dong Yi.
- Portrayed by Seo Woo-jin in the 2012 tvN TV series Queen and I.
- Portrayed by Kang Han-byeol in the 2012 MBC TV series The King's Doctor.
- Portrayed by Yoo Ah-in and Chae Sang-woo in the 2013 SBS TV series Jang Ok-jung, Living by Love.
- Portrayed by Choi Min-soo in the 2016 SBS TV series The Royal Gambler.
- Portrayed by Kim Kap-soo in the 2019 SBS TV series Haechi.

== See also ==
- History of Korea
- List of monarchs of Korea
- Styles and titles in Joseon
- Politics of Joseon

== Notes ==
Sukjong of Joseon House of Yi Born: 7 October 1661 Died: 12 July 1720
Royal titles
Preceded by Hyeonjong	King of Joseon; 17 September 1674 – 12 July 1720	Succeeded by Gyeongjong
