= Imcheon Cho clan =

Korean clan from South Chungcheong Province

- Country: Korea
- Founder: Cho Ch'ŏnhyŏk
- Connected members: Cho Yong-pil

Imcheon Jo clan (Korean: 임천 조씨; Hanja: 林川 趙氏) is a Korean clan, with the bon-gwan (ancestral seat) located in Buyeo County, South Chungcheong Province. According to the 2015 South Korean census, the number of Imcheon Cho clan was 14,258.

According to the clan, their founder was Zhao Shoukang (趙守康), known in Korean as Cho Su'gang (조수강). He was the fifth son of Zhao Weiji (趙惟吉), who was a grandson of Emperor Taizu of Song. Zhao Shoukang passed the jinshi Imperial examination in Song dynasty and served as gongfengguan (供奉官). However, he heard of Zhao Dezhao's treatment by Emperor Taizong, so he left the Song dynasty to go to Goryeo with his uncle, Zhao Weigu (趙惟固), known in Korean as Cho Yugo (조유고). Then Zhao Shoukang changed his name to Cho Ch'ŏnhyŏk (조천혁; 趙天赫). Finally, he was appointed as the Count of Garim (가림백; 嘉林伯) because of his contributions when he fought against Khitans and began Imcheon Cho clan.

== See also ==
- Cho (Korean surname)
- Korean clan names of foreign origin
