= Soron (Korean political faction) =

17th and 18th century Joseon faction

The Soron (Korean: 소론; Hanja: 少論; RR: soron) was a political faction of the Joseon Dynasty. The faction was consisted of the opponents of Song Siyeol after the split of the Westerners. Their leader was Yun Jeung, who died in 1714. They were favored by King Gyeongjong, who died in October 1724. In December 1728, King Yeongjo (who favored Noron) was accused of poisoning King Gyeongjong. This led to the Musin Revolt in Jeolla Province. The rebels enjoyed support from people in Gyeonggi Province and Chungcheong Province.

== Origins and formation ==
After the Injo coup of 1623 that led to the replacement of king Gwanghaegun of Joseon with Injo of Joseon, political faction Westerners, who gained political power as a result of the event, was split into two factions, which were Hunseo (who actively participated in the coup, 勳西) faction, also called Gongseo (功西), that was led by Kim Ryu (金瑬) and the Cheongseo (Westerners who did not actively participate in the coup, 淸西) faction led by Kim Sang Heon (金尙憲). The political faction Hunseo was later renamed as Noseo (Old Weseterner, 老西) and Cheongseo, was later renamed as Soseo (Young Westerners, 少西). In the much later period of the reign of King Injo, the Hunseo faction was divided into two, one faction led by Won dupyo, thus appropriately named the Won faction, and the Nak faction led by Kim ja jeom. Cheongseo faction was also similarly split in two, the san faction (Mountain party), which were led by the sarims originated from Goesan and Hoedeok counties which values the purity of scholars that are not influenced by power, and the Han faction (people in the capital Hanseong, modern day Seoul) who tried to fit the needs of the people in power. The Soron movement was the movement branched from the san faction when the faction included the political figure Song si yeol.

The direct cause of the branching of the Soron faction from the San faction was the controversy surrounding the appeal made in 1682 by Han taedong blaming Kim ik hun, who led the 1680 radical persecution of the political faction Southerners. Songsiyeol who was against this appeal became the leader of the political faction Noron, and the faction who supported the appeal led by Yun Jeung, who was a disciple of Song si yeol became Soron.

== Gaining power and split ==
Soron faction gained in power in 1694 as a result of Gapsul Hwanguk. The political landscape after 1694 was mainly decided by the political factions Noron and Soron. The Soron faction was divided into two factions as a result of the execution of Crown Prince Sado. The people who empathized with the dead prince was called Shi faction and the people who agreed with the execution was called byeok faction.

== Members ==
- Yun Jeung

== See also ==
- Sukjong of Joseon
- Gyeongjong of Joseon
- Yeongjo of Joseon
- Jeongjo of Joseon
- Yi San (TV series)
- Dong Yi (TV series)
- Haechi (TV series)
