= Dong Yi (TV series) =

2010 South Korean television series

- Promotional poster
- Hangul: 동이
- Hanja: 同伊
- RR: Dongi
- MR: Tongi
- Genre: Historical; Romance
- Written by: Kim Yi-young
- Directed by: Lee Byung-hoon; Kim Sang-hyub
- Starring: Han Hyo-joo; Ji Jin-hee; Lee So-yeon; Bae Soo-bin; Park Ha-sun; Jung Jin-young
- Opening theme: "Walking on a Dreamy Road" by Jang Na-ra
- Country of origin: South Korea
- Original language: Korean
- No. of episodes: 60

Production
- Executive producers: Kim Ho-young; Ahn Seung-gak
- Producer: Lee Se-joong
- Running time: 70 minutes
- Production companies: Lydus Contents Company; AStory

Original release
- Network: MBC TV
- Release: 22 March – 12 October 2010

Dong Yi (Korean: 동이) is a 2010 South Korean historical television series directed by Lee Byung-hoon. It first aired on MBC from 22 March to 12 October 2010 on Mondays and Tuesdays at 21:55 time slot for 60 episodes.

Starring Han Hyo-joo in the title role, Dong Yi tells the story of a simple water maid who rises high in the royal court as a consort and ultimately, mother of the 21st king of the Joseon dynasty. The series follows her journey to becoming Consort Suk, as she overcomes injustice and adversity while remaining true to her principles of loyalty and justice. Featuring elaborate Korean traditional culture, themes of ambition, love and sacrifice, it is also known for depicting the romance between King Sukjong and Consort Suk, highlighting their growing affection and the challenges they face as they navigate the complex political battles of the Joseon court.

The series was also broadcast elsewhere in Asia; in Japan, it aired weekly on NHK's satellite channel BS Premium from April 2011. It also recorded viewership ratings in the mid-20% to 30% range in South Korea. Han Hyo-joo won multiple acting awards for her performance including Daesang (Grand Prize) at the MBC Drama Awards and Best Actress at the Baeksang Arts Awards.

== Plot ==
=== Childhood ===
Set during the reign of King Sukjong in the Joseon period, the series is based on real-life historical figure Consort Suk.

Choe Dong-yi's father and brother are members of the Sword Fraternity, which is wrongfully accused of murdering noblemen. The King orders their execution and they are killed by soldiers while attempting to flee. Dong-yi hides her identity and enters the palace as a servant in the Bureau of Music, determined to reveal her family's innocence and find the true orchestrators of the noblemen's deaths.

=== As court lady in the Inspection Department ===
Dong-yi rises from the position of a servant to a court lady in the Inspection Department through her investigative skills and drive for justice.

The court is split between the Westerners faction (backed by the Queen Dowager and Queen Min) and the Southerners faction (backed by the King's favored concubine, Jang Ok-jeong). Unaware of his true identity, Dong-yi befriends the King and becomes his trusted confidante.

Originally, Dong-yi admires Jang Ok-jeong on the basis that both are clever, ambitious women from the lower classes. However, she is horrified to realize that Jang Ok-jeong and her brother, Jang Hee-jae, are poisoning the Queen Dowager for refusing to acknowledge Jang Ok-jeong as a royal consort. They also frame the innocent Queen Min for the Queen Dowager's death.

Queen Min is stripped of her title and exiled to the countryside. Dong-yi vows to find the evidence that proves Queen Min's innocence and bring her back into the palace. While investigating the Royal Treasury, Dong-yi discovers proof that Jang Hee-jae bribed officials and apothecaries to frame Queen Min. Before she can bring this evidence to the King, she is gravely injured by Jang Hee-jae's assassins and goes missing.

Jang Ok-jeong takes her place as queen, and her son, Yi Yun, is declared crown prince. The Southerners are more powerful than ever. Meanwhile, Dong-yi is hiding in a distant province as she recuperates her health. There, she discovers that Jang Hee-jae is involved in a conspiracy with the Qing envoys: in exchange for the Emperor's approval of Yi Yun as crown prince, Jang Hee-jae will give them military records of the Joseon border.

Dong-yi escapes Jang Hee-jae and returns to the capital with proof that he planned to expose matters of state interest to a foreign government. The King is overjoyed to see her again, and he realizes that he is in love with her.

=== As royal consort ===
Despite her status as a vulgar commoner, Dong-yi is brought into the court as the King's concubine. Through her new position, she exposes that Queen Jang, her brother and the Southerners faction had contrived to sell state secrets to the Qing envoys to strengthen the position of the Crown Prince. Jang Hee-jae and the majority of the Southerners are stripped of their courtly titles and exiled. Jang Ok-jeong should also be exiled; however, as the biological mother of the Crown Prince, she is merely demoted to her previous rank of royal consort of the first senior rank (Consort Hui). Queen Min is declared innocent and reinstated.

Dong-yi is highly favored by Queen Min for proving her innocence and convincing the King to reinstate her to her former position. She declares Dong-yi a royal consort of the fourth junior rank and an official member of the royal family. Dong-yi gives birth to the King's second son, Prince Yeongsu.

=== New Sword Fraternity and the past exposed ===
A year has passed. The Sword Fraternity is resurrected. Unlike their former iteration, they are violent and murder noblemen who are involved in corruption and cause the commoners to suffer. Dong-yi fears that her identity as a traitor's daughter will be exposed, and she decides to investigate. She learns that the leader of the fraternity is her old childhood friend, Gae-dwo-ra. She realizes that Oh Tae-suk had previously murdered his fellow Southerners in order to consolidate power and had framed the Sword Fraternity, resulting in the death of her father and brother.

Jang Mu-yeol, a Southerner police chief, realizes the unusual connection between Dong-yi and the Sword Fraternity, and uses it to supplant Oh Tae-suk as the head of the Southerners faction and remove Consort Hui's enemy, Dong-yi. He murders Oh Tae-suk and blames the Sword Fraternity for his death, and lures Dong-yi into a trap by exploiting her attempt to help the injured Gae-dwo-ra.

The King finds out about Dong-yi's father and brother from Gae-dwo-ra and attempts to hide Dong-yi's identity. However, Consort Hui wants Dong-yi executed. She once again makes plans to guilt Dong-yi into confessing the truth and it works. Dong-yi is charged with hiding her identity and helping the leader of a rebel group. The Southerners petition to have her executed; however, in light of the death of Dong-yi's newborn son, Prince Yeongsu due to measles, the King exiles her from the palace but allows her to keep her title.

=== In exile ===
The King is heartbroken by his separation from Dong-yi. Despite being forbidden to do so, he goes to her residence and spends the night with her. She gives birth to her second child, Yi Geum.

The six-year-old Yi Geum is bright and intelligent, but he longs to meet his father. On an undercover outing, the King meets Yi Geum and he realises he is his son. The King befriends him, posing as an administrative officer.

Consort Hui's mother learns about the King's secret meetings with Yi Geum and his lingering affection for Dong-yi, and hires assassins to burn Dong-yi's residence in order to kill her and her son. The royal guards, who were instructed to watch over the residence, rescue both mother and son from the fire. The King rushes to Dong-yi and upon meeting her again asks her to return to the palace with their son.

The King has been waiting to bring Dong-yi and her son to court and uses the failed assassination attempt as a pretext to bring them back. The King also used Yi Geum's age to convince the ministers that he must return to the palace because he is required to receive royal education.

=== Return to the palace ===
Queen Min has no children of her own and adores Yi Geum (now titled Prince Yeoning). She and her supporters seek to promote Prince Yeoning as crown prince, replacing Consort Hui's son after she finds out that the Crown Prince is infertile. However, she suddenly collapses from an illness, and Consort Hui uses a shaman and black magic to make sure Queen Min dies.

The ministers initially push for Consort Hui to become queen once again, but then rumors spread throughout the palace that the Crown Prince is infertile due to an undisclosed condition. Since the Crown Prince is infertile, Prince Yeoning would be the natural alternative to be the King's heir. Consort Hui's supporters begin to abandon her and the Crown Prince in favor of Dong-yi and her son.

Desperate to retain her son's position, Consort Hui attempts to assassinate Dong-yi and Prince Yeoning. Dong-yi is injured, but the Prince is unharmed.

The King executes Consort Hui for using black magic to kill Queen Min, hiding the Crown Prince's infertility, and attempting to kill Dong-yi and Prince Yeoning. Before her execution, Consort Hui acknowledges her wrongs and begs Dong-yi to protect the Crown Prince.

The king asks Dong-yi to become the new queen but she refuses in order to protect both princes. She cites all the chaos Consort Hui has caused in the royal court, and asks the King to pass a new law preventing royal consorts from becoming queen in hopes that similar power struggles will not occur again. The King agrees and appoints Lady Kim as queen.

The King knows that the Crown Prince's supporters will always regard Prince Yeoning as a threat to the Crown Prince. For both to survive, both must become kings. Because the Crown Prince is infertile, he will rule first after the King; Prince Yeoning will follow him. Because Prince Yeoning has a biological mother of low status, the King knows that the ministers will not respect his position, so he decides to abdicate so that Yi Yun would become king and Yi Geum will be cemented as crown prince. However, Queen Kim adopts Prince Yeoning, legitimizing his position and ensuring that he will follow the Crown Prince to the throne after his death.

Dong-yi decides to leave the palace so that she can help the poor commoners and so that Queen Kim can be the only mother of Prince Yeoning.

=== A new king ===
Dong-yi's son later becomes the 21st ruler of Joseon, King Yeongjo, father of Crown Prince Sado and grandfather of King Jeongjo.

== Cast ==
=== Main ===
- Han Hyo-joo as Choe Dong-yi, Consort Suk
  - Kim You-jung as young Choe Dong-yi
- Ji Jin-hee as King Sukjong
- Lee So-yeon as Jang Ok-jeong, Consort Hui
- Bae Soo-bin as Cha Chun-soo
- Park Ha-sun as Queen Min
- Jung Jin-young as Seo Young-gi

=== Supporting ===
- Jung Dong-hwan as Oh Tae-suk
- Lee Kye-in as Oh Tae-poong
- Choi Cheol-ho as Oh Yoon
- Kim Yu-seok as Jang Hee-jae
- Son Il-kwon as Hong Tae-yoon
- Shin Guk as Royal Secretary
- Na Sung-kyoon as Jung In-gook
- Kim Dong-yoon as Shim Woon-taek
- Park Jung-soo as Queen Dowager Hyeonryeol
- Kim Hye-sun as Court Lady Jung
- Kim So-yi as Court Lady Bong
- Ahn Yeo-jin as Court Lady Jo
- Lim Sung-min as Court Lady Yoo
- Jeong Yu-mi as Jung-eum
- Kang Yu-mi as Ae-jong
- Oh Eun-ho as Shi-bi
- Han Da-min as Eun-geum
- Choi Ha-na as Mi-ji
- Lee Jung-hoon as Lee Jong-ok
- Choi Jae-ho as Park Do-soo
- Yeo Ho-min as Oh Ho-yang
- Lee Hee-do as Hwang Joo-shik
- Lee Kwang-soo as Park Yeong-dal
- Jung Sung-woon as Choe Dong-joo
- Jung In-gi as Kim Hwan
- Jung Ki-sung as Kim Hwan's disciple
- Lee Sook as Lady Park
- Kim Hye-jin as Seol-hee
- Choi Ran as Lady Yun
- Yeo Hyun-soo as Gae-dwo-ra
  - Choi Soo-han as young Gae-dwo-ra
- Jung Eun-pyo as Gae-dwo-ra's father
- Jung Sun-il as Park Doo-kyung
- Kwon Min as Cha Soo-taek
- Choi Jong-hwan as Jang Mu-yeol
- Lee Hyung-suk as Yi Geum, Prince Yeoning
  - Lee Seon-ho as King Yeongjo
- Shin Gyu-ri as Seo Hye-in, Princess Consort Dalseong
  - Jung Mo-rye as Queen Seo
- Yoon Chan as Crown Prince Yi Yun
- Heo Yi-seul as Young-sun
- Maeng Sang-hoon as Kim Goo-sun
- Oh Yeon-seo as Queen Kim
- Nam Da-reum as Prince Eunpyeong
- Chun Ho-jin as Choe Hyo-won
- Lee Jae-yong as Jang Ik-heon
- Choi Il-hwa as Seo Jung-ho

== Production ==
Dong Yi was written by Kim Yi-young and directed by Lee Byung-hoon. Lee previously directed the hit 2003 period drama Jewel in the Palace. The series was originally planned for 50 episodes, but was extended by ten episodes during its run.

It was filmed at Yongin Daejanggeum Park located at Cheoin District, Yongin, Gyeonggi Province, where other historical dramas such as Moon Embracing the Sun, Jumong and Queen Seondeok were also filmed.

== Ratings ==
In the table below, the blue numbers represent the lowest ratings and the red numbers represent the highest ratings.

| Broadcast date | Episode | TNmS | | AGB Nielsen | |
| Broadcast date | Episode | Nationwide | Seoul | Nationwide | Seoul |
|---|---|---|---|---|---|
| 22 March 2010 | 1 | 11.4 (15th) | 12.9 (8th) | 11.6 (16th) | 12.8 (11th) |
| 23 March 2010 | 2 | 11.5 (12th) | 12.6 (10th) | 11.6 (13th) | 13.1 (10th) |
| 29 March 2010 | 3 | 11.8 (14th) | 12.9 (12th) | 12.7 (13th) | 13.7 (12th) |
| 30 March 2010 | 4 | 12.3 (11th) | 13.4 (10th) | 13.6 (9th) | 15.2 (8th) |
| 5 April 2010 | 5 | 15.3 (6th) | 16.4 (4th) | 14.7 (7th) | 15.6 (6th) |
| 6 April 2010 | 6 | 14.2 (7th) | 15.2 (6th) | 15.7 (7th) | 17.4 (5th) |
| 12 April 2010 | 7 | 17.2 (5th) | 18.9 (2nd) | 17.9 (4th) | 20.1 (4th) |
| 13 April 2010 | 8 | 17.2 (5th) | 18.5 (2nd) | 18.8 (4th) | 20.4 (4th) |
| 19 April 2010 | 9 | 19.0 (4th) | 20.4 (2nd) | 19.2 (3rd) | 20.9 (1st) |
| 20 April 2010 | 10 | 19.7 (1st) | 21.3 (1st) | 18.2 (4th) | 19.7 (4th) |
| 26 April 2010 | 11 | 21.6 (2nd) | 23.5 (2nd) | 21.0 (3rd) | 24.0 (1st) |
| 27 April 2010 | 12 | 22.5 (2nd) | 24.5 (2nd) | 21.6 (2nd) | 23.9 (2nd) |
| 3 May 2010 | 13 | 22.9 (1st) | 25.2 (1st) | 20.0 (3rd) | 22.0 (3rd) |
| 4 May 2010 | 14 | 20.4 (2nd) | 21.9 (1st) | 19.9 (2nd) | 22.6 (1st) |
| 10 May 2010 | 15 | 25.8 (1st) | 27.9 (1st) | 25.1 (1st) | 28.1 (1st) |
| 11 May 2010 | 16 | 28.5 (1st) | 30.8 (1st) | 26.2 (1st) | 30.2 (1st) |
| 17 May 2010 | 17 | 25.0 (1st) | 27.1 (1st) | 25.0 (1st) | 28.0 (1st) |
| 18 May 2010 | 18 | 25.6 (1st) | 27.3 (1st) | 25.0 (1st) | 25.9 (1st) |
| 24 May 2010 | 19 | 24.1 (2nd) | 26.2 (2nd) | 24.6 (2nd) | 28.1 (2nd) |
| 25 May 2010 | 20 | 23.8 (1st) | 26.0 (1st) | 22.4 (2nd) | 25.3 (1st) |
| 31 May 2010 | 21 | 25.1 (1st) | 27.7 (1st) | 23.0 (2nd) | 25.5 (1st) |
| 1 June 2010 | 22 | 26.6 (1st) | 29.3 (1st) | 24.2 (1st) | 26.9 (1st) |
| 7 June 2010 | 23 | 28.1 (1st) | 30.9 (1st) | 23.9 (1st) | 27.2 (1st) |
| 8 June 2010 | 24 | 30.3 (1st) | 33.2 (1st) | 25.8 (1st) | 29.7 (1st) |
| 14 June 2010 | 25 | 31.0 (1st) | 33.3 (1st) | 27.4 (1st) | 30.1 (1st) |
| 15 June 2010 | 26 | 33.1% (1st) | 35.6% (1st) | 29.1% (1st) | 32.3% (1st) |
| 21 June 2010 | 27 | 29.1 (1st) | 31.0 (1st) | 26.9 (1st) | 29.8 (1st) |
| 22 June 2010 | 28 | 30.1 (1st) | 32.6 (1st) | 28.0 (1st) | 30.6 (1st) |
| 28 June 2010 | 29 | 31.1 (1st) | 32.8 (1st) | 28.0 (1st) | 30.4 (1st) |
| 29 June 2010 | 30 | 31.9 (1st) | 33.8 (1st) | 28.7 (1st) | 31.5 (1st) |
| 5 July 2010 | 31 | 30.8 (1st) | 33.3 (1st) | 26.1 (1st) | 28.6 (1st) |
| 6 July 2010 | 32 | 31.3 (1st) | 33.8 (1st) | 27.5 (1st) | 30.4 (1st) |
| 12 July 2010 | 33 | 29.1 (1st) | 31.1 (1st) | 26.3 (1st) | 29.1 (1st) |
| 13 July 2010 | 34 | 29.7 (1st) | 31.7 (1st) | 27.4 (1st) | 30.6 (1st) |
| 19 July 2010 | 35 | 27.6 (1st) | 30.0 (1st) | 24.3 (1st) | 27.0 (1st) |
| 20 July 2010 | 36 | 29.4 (1st) | 32.0 (1st) | 25.3 (1st) | 27.9 (1st) |
| 26 July 2010 | 37 | 28.8 (1st) | 31.2 (1st) | 24.4 (1st) | 26.8 (1st) |
| 27 July 2010 | 38 | 30.6 (1st) | 33.3 (1st) | 25.7 (1st) | 28.3 (1st) |
| 2 August 2010 | 39 | 23.9 (1st) | 25.8 (1st) | 21.5 (1st) | 23.3 (1st) |
| 3 August 2010 | 40 | 23.1 (1st) | 25.0 (1st) | 21.9 (1st) | 25.1 (1st) |
| 9 August 2010 | 41 | 23.7 (1st) | 25.9 (1st) | 22.7 (1st) | 24.8 (1st) |
| 10 August 2010 | 42 | 23.2 (1st) | 25.2 (1st) | 21.3 (3rd) | 23.3 (2nd) |
| 16 August 2010 | 43 | 23.3 (1st) | 25.0 (1st) | 22.7 (1st) | 25.2 (1st) |
| 17 August 2010 | 44 | 24.8 (1st) | 26.6 (1st) | 21.6 (2nd) | 23.6 (2nd) |
| 23 August 2010 | 45 | 24.7 (1st) | 26.5 (1st) | 24.3 (1st) | 27.7 (1st) |
| 24 August 2010 | 46 | 26.8 (1st) | 29.3 (1st) | 25.1 (1st) | 28.1 (1st) |
| 30 August 2010 | 47 | 30.7 (1st) | 33.0 (1st) | 27.3 (1st) | 29.9 (1st) |
| 31 August 2010 | 48 | 30.3 (1st) | 32.5 (1st) | 27.4 (1st) | 30.0 (1st) |
| 6 September 2010 | 49 | 29.5 (1st) | 31.8 (1st) | 27.7 (1st) | 30.1 (1st) |
| 7 September 2010 | 50 | 28.6 (1st) | 30.7 (1st) | 25.3 (1st) | 27.3 (1st) |
| 13 September 2010 | 51 | 26.4 (1st) | 28.8 (1st) | 24.5 (1st) | 26.5 (1st) |
| 14 September 2010 | 52 | 27.0 (1st) | 29.8 (1st) | 24.5 (1st) | 26.4 (1st) |
| 20 September 2010 | 53 | 23.0 (1st) | 25.5 (1st) | 22.7 (1st) | 24.4 (1st) |
| 21 September 2010 | 54 | 20.2 (1st) | 21.1 (1st) | 19.7 (1st) | 21.9 (1st) |
| 27 September 2010 | 55 | 25.7 (1st) | 28.3 (1st) | 24.4 (2nd) | 26.7 (1st) |
| 28 September 2010 | 56 | 23.6 (3rd) | 25.7 (1st) | 24.4 (2nd) | 26.7 (2nd) |
| 4 October 2010 | 57 | 20.9 (2nd) | 23.2 (1st) | 22.2 (2nd) | 24.3 (1st) |
| 5 October 2010 | 58 | 20.3 (2nd) | 22.2 (1st) | 22.6 (2nd) | 24.7 (2nd) |
| 11 October 2010 | 59 | 24.9 (2nd) | 27.9 (1st) | 24.4 (2nd) | 27.4 (2nd) |
| 12 October 2010 | 60 | 22.3 (3rd) | 24.2 (1st) | 24.3 (1st) | 26.4 (1st) |
| Average | | 24.5% | 26.6% | 23.0% | 25.4% |

== Awards ==
2010 3rd Korea Drama Awards

- Best Actress: Han Hyo-joo
- Best Supporting Actor: Jung Dong-hwan
- Achievement Award: Lee Byung-hoon

2010 MBC Drama Awards

- Daesang (Grand Prize): Han Hyo-joo
- Top Excellence Award, Actor: Ji Jin-hee
- Excellence Award, Actress: Lee So-yeon
- Best New Actress: Park Ha-sun
- Golden Acting Award, Supporting Actor: Kim Yu-seok
- Best Young Actor: Kim You-jung and Lee Hyung-suk
- Popularity Award, Actress: Han Hyo-joo
- Viewer's Favorite Drama of the Year: Dong Yi

2011 1st Hong Kong Cable TV Awards

- Best Drama
- Best Actor: Ji Jin-hee
- Best Actress: Han Hyo-joo

2011 47th Baeksang Arts Awards

- Best Actress – Television: Han Hyo-joo
