= Soo-jung =

- Hangul: 수정
- RR: Sujeong
- MR: Sujŏng
- IPA: [sudʑʌŋ]

Soo-jung, also spelled Soo-jeong, or Su-jeong, Su-jung, Su-jong, is a Korean given name.

People with this name include:

== Sportspeople ==
- Park Soo-jeong (volleyball) (born 1972), South Korean female volleyball player
- Lim Su-jeong (kickboxer) (born 1985), South Korean female kickboxer
- Lim Su-jeong (taekwondo) (born 1986), South Korean female taekwondo practitioner
- Hong Su-jong (born 1986 or 1989), North Korean female artistic gymnast
- Jang Su-jeong (born 1995), South Korean female tennis player
- Kim Su-jong (born 2000), North Korean female artistic gymnast

== Entertainers ==
- Hwang Soo-jung (born 1972), South Korean actress
- Im Soo-jung (born 1979), South Korean actress
- Lee Soo-jung (born 1993), Korean-American singer-songwriter
- Krystal Jung (Korean name Jung Soo-jung, born 1994), South Korean female singer, member of girl group f(x)
- Ryu Su-jeong (born 1997), South Korean female singer, member of girl group Lovelyz
- Kim Su-jung (born 2004), South Korean actress

== Other ==
- Andrew Yeom Soo-jung (born 1943), Roman Catholic Archbishop of Seoul
- Kim Soo-jung (born 1950), South Korean male cartoonist
- Nicole Chung (Korean name Jung Soo Jung, born 1981), Korean-American author
- Soo Jung Ann (born 1989), South Korean female pianist
- Christel Lee (Korean name Lee Soo-jung, born 1990), American-Canadian female violinist of Korean descent

== See also ==
- List of Korean given names
