= Gapsul Hwanguk =

1694 political purge in Korea

- Hangul: 갑술환국
- Hanja: 甲戌換局
- Revised Romanization: Gapsul Hwanguk
- McCune–Reischauer: Kapsul Hwan'guk

The Gapsul Hwanguk (Korean: 갑술환국) occurred in 1694. The Southerners attempt to purge Westerners on charge of plotting to reinstate deposed Queen Inhyeon backfired. The Southerners would never recover from this purge politically. However, the Westerners already split into Noron and Soron. The Southerners came to power with difficulty in 1689. The men were always uneasy about their power and could not relax the tension that they could fall again at any time. In the meantime, Kim Chun-taek who was Noron and Han Joong-hyuk who was Soron, staged a campaign to reinstate Queen Inhyun. Ham-Iwan said it to Min Am who is the Southerners, and the Southerners arrest dozens of people, including Kim Chun-taek, with the aim of ousting the main opposition party.
