= Eunjin Song clan =

Korean clan from South Chungcheong Province

- Country: Korea
- Current region: Eunjin, Nonsan, South Chungcheong Province
- Founder: Song Cheon ik
- Connected members: Song Min-soon; Song Joong-ki; Song Ji-eun; Mino (rapper); Song So-hee; Song Kang-ho; Song Si-yeol; Song Shin-young; Song Young-moo; Song Il-gook; Song Ja; Song Jun-gil; Song Seung-jun

Eunjin Song clan (Korean: 은진 송씨; Hanja: 恩津 宋氏) is one of the Korean clans. Their Bon-gwan is in Nonsan, South Chungcheong Province. In a 2015 estimate, they numbered 226,050. Their founder was Song Cheon ik, a descendant of Song Ju eun.

== See also ==
- Korean clan names of foreign origin
