= Noron (Korean political faction) =

17th and 18th century Joseon faction

Noron 노론 老論
- Leader: Song Si-yŏl; Gwon Sang-ha
- Founded: 1680
- Dissolved: 1727
- Religion: Confucianism (Neo-Confucianism)

The Noron (Korean: 노론; Hanja: 老論; RR: noron) were a political faction of the Joseon Dynasty in Korea. They consisted of the supporters of Song Siyeol after the split of the Westerners. The Noron suffered setbacks with regent Kim Seok-ju's death in 1684 and Song's execution in 1689. In 1701, Queen Inhyeon, who favored the Noron, died. They were favored by King Yeongjo, who came to the throne in 1724.

== Members ==
- Song Siyeol
- Kim Seok-ju
- Kim Jo-sun

== See also ==
- Sukjong of Joseon
- Gyeongjong of Joseon
- Yeongjo of Joseon
- Jeongjo of Joseon
- Yi San (TV series)
- Dong Yi (TV series)
- Haechi (TV series)
- The Red Sleeve
