= Hyeonjong of Joseon =

King of Joseon from 1659 to 1674

Hyeonjong

King of Joseon
- Reign: 23 June 1659 – 17 September 1674
- Enthronement: 28 June 1659; Injeongjeon, Changdeokgung
- Predecessor: Hyojong
- Successor: Sukjong

Crown Prince of Joseon
- Tenure: 17 June 1649 – 23 June 1659
- Predecessor: Crown Prince Ho
- Successor: Crown Prince Sun

Grand Heir of Joseon
- Tenure: 30 March – 17 June 1649
- Predecessor: Grand Heir Hong-wi
- Successor: Grand Heir Jeong
- Born: 14 March 1641; Mukden, Qing Empire
- Died: 17 September 1674 (aged 33); Changdeokgung, Hanseong, Joseon
- Burial: Sungneung, Donggureung Cluster, Guri, South Korea
- Spouse: Queen Myeongseong (m. 1651)
- Issue Detail: Sukjong of Joseon
Names
- Yi Yeon (이연; 李棩)
Era dates
- Adopted the era name of the Qing dynasty (Note: Sunchi (Shunzhi) (순치; 順治): 1659–1661 Ganghui (Kangxi) (강희; 康熙): 1662–1674)
Regnal name
- Sohyu Yeongyeong Dondeok Suseong (소휴연경돈덕수성; 昭休衍慶敦德綏成) (Note: Known as honorific name (존호; 尊號) in the Sinosphere, its closest equivalent in the English-speaking world is the regnal name.)
Posthumous name
- Joseon: Great King Janggak Sunmun Sugmu Gyeongin Changhyo (장각순문숙무경인창효대왕; 莊恪純文肅武敬仁彰孝大王); Qing dynasty: Janggak (장각; 莊恪)
Temple name
- Hyeonjong (현종; 顯宗)
- Clan: Jeonju Yi
- Dynasty: Yi
- Father: King Hyojong
- Mother: Queen Inseon
- Religion: Confucianism (Neo-Confucianism)

Korean name
- Hangul: 현종
- Hanja: 顯宗
- Lit.: "Illustrious Ancestor"
- RR: Hyeonjong
- MR: Hyŏnjong

Courtesy name
- Hangul: 경직
- Hanja: 景直
- RR: Gyeongjik
- MR: Kyŏngjik

Hyeonjong (Korean: 현종; Hanja: 顯宗; 14 March 1641 – 17 September 1674), (Note: In the Korean calendar (lunisolar), he was born on the 4th day of the 2nd lunar month and died on the 18th day of the 8th lunar month.) personal name Yi Yeon, was the 18th monarch of Joseon. The only surviving son of King Hyojong, his reign was characterized by heavy conflict among the political factions on various issues, particularly on funeral rites. He is also remembered as the only king in Joseon's more than 500 years of history who did not take concubines.

== Biography ==
=== Background ===
Hyeonjong was born in 1641 as the first son of King Hyojong as Yi Yeon, while his father was still in China as a captive of the Qing dynasty; thus he was born at Shenyang before the Qing dynasty officially moved its capital to Beijing after defeating Ming dynasty in 1644, which made him the first and only monarch of Joseon to be born abroad. He returned to Korea in 1645 along with his father and became Crown Prince in 1651.

=== Yesong Controversy ===
The Yesong Controversy refers to a conflict concerning the funeral of Hyojong. When he died in 1659, his son Hyeonjong succeeded his father as the ruler of Joseon. The conservative Westerners faction and the liberal Southerners faction argued about how long Queen Jangryeol, King Injo's second wife, should have to wear the funeral garment according to the Confucian form of funeral. The Westerners, headed by Song Si-yeol, contended that she needed to wear the funeral garment for only a year, while the Southerners and their leader Heo Jeok wanted a 3-year period. This conflict arose because there was no previous record about Confucian funeral requirements when somebody's second stepson who actually succeeded the family line dies. The Westerners wanted to follow the custom for a second stepson, while the Southerners thought Hyojong deserved a 3-year funeral since he actually succeeded King Injo in the royal line.

The final decision was up to young King Hyeonjong; He chose to enforce a 1-year period, which would keep the Westerners as the major faction. However, at the same time, Hyeonjong did not remove Heo Jeok from office of Prime Minister, in order to prevent the Westerners from threatening royal authority. The feud between the Southerners and the Westerners was highly intensified by the funeral issue; Earlier, after the fall of the Greater Northerners in 1623, the Westerners and the Southerners formed political alliance under the leadership of King Hyojong, but on the funeral issue, both sides were intractable, leading to a greater probability of confrontations.

Hyeonjong at first maintained the balance of two factions by compromising between them with the 1-year period of the Westerners and keeping Southerner Heo Jeok as Prime Minister, and the two factions resumed a peaceful relationship temporarily. However, in 1674, when Queen Inseon, Hyojong's wife and Hyeonjong's mother, died, the funeral issue came up again; The Southerners wanted Queen Jaeui to wear the funeral garment for one year while the Westerners preferred a nine-month period. This time Hyeonjong listened to the Southerners and selected their method, making the Southerners faction as major political faction over the Westerners. The funeral controversy continued even after Hyeonjong died in 1675, and it was settled by Hyeonjong's successor King Sukjong, who banned all debate about the issue. The controversy even affected the publishing of official history of Hyeonjong's era; at first it was written chiefly by Southerners but later it was revised by Westerner historians.

=== Reign ===
In 1666, during Hyeonjong's reign, Dutchman Hendrick Hamel left Korea after more than thirteen years of captivity. He returned to the Netherlands, where he wrote a book about Joseon Dynasty and his experience in Korea, which introduced the kingdom to many Europeans.

From 1670 to 1671, Korea endured a devastating famine brought on by cold weather and poor harvests. While the death toll remains difficult to measure, hundreds of thousands of Koreans may have died.

Hyeonjong stopped Hyojong's insuperable plan of northern conquest since Joseon had become a tributary state of the Qing Dynasty. Furthermore, after a series of victories against the Ming Dynasty, the Qing Dynasty had become too mighty to resist. However, Hyeonjong continued Hyojong's military expansion and reconstruction of the nation, devastated by the Seven-Year War and two Manchu invasions. He also encouraged astronomy and printing. He also legally banned the marriage between relatives and those who share the same surnames. He died in 1674, and his son Sukjong succeeded him.

== Family ==
- Father: King Hyojong (효종대왕; 3 July 1619 – 23 June 1659)
  - Grandfather: King Injo (인조대왕; 7 December 1595 – 17 June 1649)
  - Grandmother: Queen Inyeol (인렬왕후), of the Cheongju Han clan (청주 한씨; 16 August 1594 – 16 January 1636)
  - Step-grandmother: Queen Jangnyeol (장렬왕후), of the Yangju Jo clan (양주 조씨; 16 December 1624 – 20 September 1688)
- Mother: Queen Inseon (인선왕후), of the Deoksu Jang clan (덕수 장씨; 9 February 1619 – 30 March 1674)
  - Grandfather: Jang Yu (장유), Internal Prince Sinpung (신풍부원군; 1587–1638)
  - Grandmother: Internal Princess Consort Yeongga (영가부부인), of the (new) Andong Kim clan (신 안동 김씨; 1587–1654)

Consort(s) and their respective issue

- Queen Myeongseong (명성왕후), of the Cheongpung Kim clan (청풍 김씨; 3 June 1642 – 11 January 1684) (Note: Not to be confused with Gojong's wife, Empress Myeongseong.)
  - Unnamed daughter (1658)
  - Princess Myeongseon (명선공주; 28 December 1659 – 12 September 1673), first daughter
  - Yi Sun (이순), King Sukjong (숙종대왕; 7 October 1661 – 12 July 1720), first son
  - Princess Myeonghye (명혜공주; 12 January 1663 – 11 June 1673), second daughter
  - Princess Myeongan (명안공주; 30 June 1665 – 25 June 1687), given name On-hui (온희), third daughter

== Ancestry ==
Ancestors of Hyeonjong of Joseon

King Seonjo (선조대왕)
King Wonjong (원종대왕)
Concubine In, of the Suwon Kim clan (인빈 수원 김씨)
King Injo (인조대왕)
Gu Sa-maeng, Internal Prince Neungan (능안부원군 구사맹)
Queen Inheon, of the Neungseong Gu clan (인헌왕후 능성 구씨)
Internal Princess Consort Pyongsan, of the Pyongsan Shin clan (평산부부인 평산 신씨)
King Hyojong (효종대왕)
Han Hyo-yun (한효윤)
Han Jun-gyeom, Internal Prince Seopyeong (서평부원군 한준겸)
Lady, of the Pyongsan Shin clan (평산 신씨)
Queen Inyeol, of the Cheongju Han clan (인렬왕후 청주 한씨)
Hwang Seong (황성)
Internal Princess Consort Hoesan, of the Changwon Hwang clan (회산부부인 창원 황씨)
Lady, of the Ubong Yi clan (우봉 이씨)
King Hyeonjong
Jang Il (장일)
Jang Un-ik (장운익)
Jang Yu, Internal Prince Sinpung (신풍부원군 장유)
Lady, of the Miryang Park clan (밀양 박씨)
Queen Inseon, of the Deoksu Jang clan (인선왕후 덕수 장씨)
Kim Geuk-hyo (김극효)
Kim Sang-yong (김상용)
Lady, of the Dongnae Jeong clan (동래 정씨)
Internal Princess Consort Yeongga, of the (new) Andong Kim clan (영가부부인 신 안동 김씨)
Gwon Gae (권개)
Lady, of the Andong Gwon clan (안동 권씨)

== In popular culture ==
- Portrayed by Seo Young-jin in the 1981 KBS1 TV series Daemyeong.
- Portrayed by Park Young-tae in the 2002–2003 KBS2 TV series Royal Story: Jang Hui-bin.
- Portrayed by Han Sang-jin in the 2012 MBC TV series The King's Doctor.
- Portrayed by Jeon In-taek in the 2013 SBS TV series Jang Ok-jung, Living by Love.

== See also ==
- History of Korea
- List of monarchs of Korea
- Styles and titles in Joseon
- Politics of Joseon

== Notes ==
Hyeonjong of Joseon House of Yi Born: 14 March 1641 Died: 17 September 1674
Royal titles
Preceded by Hyojong	King of Joseon; 23 June 1659 – 17 September 1674	Succeeded by Sukjong
