= Im Yunjidang =

Korean philosopher (1721–1793)

- 임윤지당
- Born: 1721; Wonju, Gangwon Province, Joseon
- Died: 1793 (aged 71–72)
- Occupation: Philosopher
- Writing career
- Notable work: Yunjidang Yugo

Im Yunjidang (Korean: 임윤지당; Hanja: 任允摯堂; 1721–1793) was a Korean writer and neo-Confucian philosopher from the Joseon period. She defended the right for a woman to become a Confucian master and argued that men and women did not differ in their human nature by interpretations of Confucianism values in moral self-cultivation and human nature.

== Biography ==
Im Yunjidang was born in Wonju, Gangwon Province into the Pungcheon Im clan (풍천 임씨; 豊川 任氏) to Im Jeok who served as a judge in Hamheung.

She belonged to a poor yangban family. Due to the hardships of her life, like the death of her father, retreat of the family to a mountain village, she was less pressured by the usual stereotypes of her time. Moreover, her brother, Im Seong-ju have been moved by her talented mind and helped her to read, access, teach the Classic of filial piety (Hyogyeong; 효경, 孝經), Biographies of Exemplary Women (Yeolnyeojeon; 열녀전, 列女傳), Lesser learning (Sohak; 소학, 小學), and became a librarian. According to an analogy of her biography, Im Yunjidang Yugo (임윤지당유고), written by her younger brother Im Jeong-ju (任 靖 周), had said that Im Yunjidang was gifted in academics, so that she and her brothers often had discussions about scriptures, history, people, and politics.

In 1739, at the age of 19, she married Shin Gwang-yu, a scholar from Wonju, and they eventually had a child, but she became a widow 8 years later in 1747 and her child died at a young age. After her husband's death, she partook her life between helping her family-in-law and committing to the Classics.

== Writings and philosophy ==
Im Yunjidang was part of a tradition opened by the Naehun of Queen Insu: using the Classics themselves to reclaim the right for women to access education and philosophy. In her writings, she discussed her cosmic view on the supremacy of gi (energy) over i (reason) and human relations based on the principle of equality. She also discussed the Four Beginnings (benevolence, righteousness, etiquette and wisdom) and the Seven Emotions (joy, anger, grief, terror, love, hate and desire).

In no place of her writings does she proactively resist neo-Confucian social norms, including the Samjongjido (삼종지도; 三從之道), which states that a woman must be a follower of her father and then of her husband and finally of her son. As stated by Kim Sung-moon, it was ironically the same series of unfortunate deaths in Im Yunjidang's life that deprived her of the possibility to follow three Ways of the virtuous Confucian woman, and that granted her the freedom to study neo-Confucian texts and develop her own philosophical thoughts.

In the end, and despite the gender bias of the Confucian society, a collection of the written thoughts of Im Yunjidang was compiled and published in 1796, three years after her death, by her brother-in-law Sin Gwang-wu and her younger brother, Im Jeong-ju. This Yunjidang Yugo has been handed down to nowadays.

== Legacy ==
She is counted as one of the first female Confucian philosophers in Korea, and served of model to Kang Jeongildang and others. Im was one of the few women authors whose works were published in Joseon-Korea, alongside the poet Seo Yeongsuhap (1753–1823), and Yi Bingheogak (1759–1824), who published the women's encyclopedia Guyhap chongseo about household tasks in 1809.

== Family ==
- Father - Im Jeok (임적; 1685–1727)
- Siblings
  - Older brother - Im Seong-ju (임성주; 任聖周; 1711–1788)
  - Younger brother - Im Jeong-ju (임정주; 任靖周)
- Husband - Shin Gwang-yu (신광유; ?–1747)
  - Brother-in-law - Shin Gwang-woo (신광우)
    - unnamed child; died young

== Sources ==
- Ko, Dorothy; Haboush, JaHyun Kim; Piggott, Joan, eds. (2003). Women and Confucian Cultures in Premodern China, Korea, and Japan. University of California Press. ISBN 9780520231382. 250 pages. --> p. 164
- Yi Pae-yong (2008). Women in Korean History. Ewha Womans University Press. ISBN 9788973007721. 319 pages
- Kim Youngmin (2011). Kim Youngmin; Pettid, Michael J. (eds.). Women and Confucianism in Choson Korea: New Perspectives. SUNY Press. ISBN 9781438437750. 170 pages
- Kim Sungmoon (July 2014). "The Way to Become a female Sage: Im Yunjidang's Confucian Feminism". Journal of the History of Ideas. 75 (3). University of Pennsylvania Press: 395–416. doi:10.1353/jhi.2014.0026. JSTOR 43289674. S2CID 144228529.
- Jeong Seonghee (2020a). 임윤지당 [Im Yunjidang]. 인물한국사 [Figures of the Korean History].
- EncyKor (2020a). 삼종지도 [samjongjido]. Encyclopedia of Korean Culture.
