= Haboush =

Haboush is a surname. Notable people with the surname include:

- JaHyun Kim Haboush (1940–2011), Korean-American historian
- Jeffrey J. Haboush, American audio engineer
- Joseph Haboush (born 1990), Lebanese footballer
- William Haboush, American mathematician
  - Haboush's theorem
