= Women in Joseon =

Women in Korea from 1392 to 1897

Women in Korea during the Joseon period (1392–1897) had changing societal positions over time. They had fewer rights than women in the Goryeo dynasty (918–1392), and fewer rights than contemporary men. Their declining social position has been attributed to the adoption of Neo-Confucian principles (with some practices local to Korea). It was uncommon for women in Joseon to be able to read, and it was sometimes expected that women wear clothing that significantly covered their body and head when they were in public.

== History ==
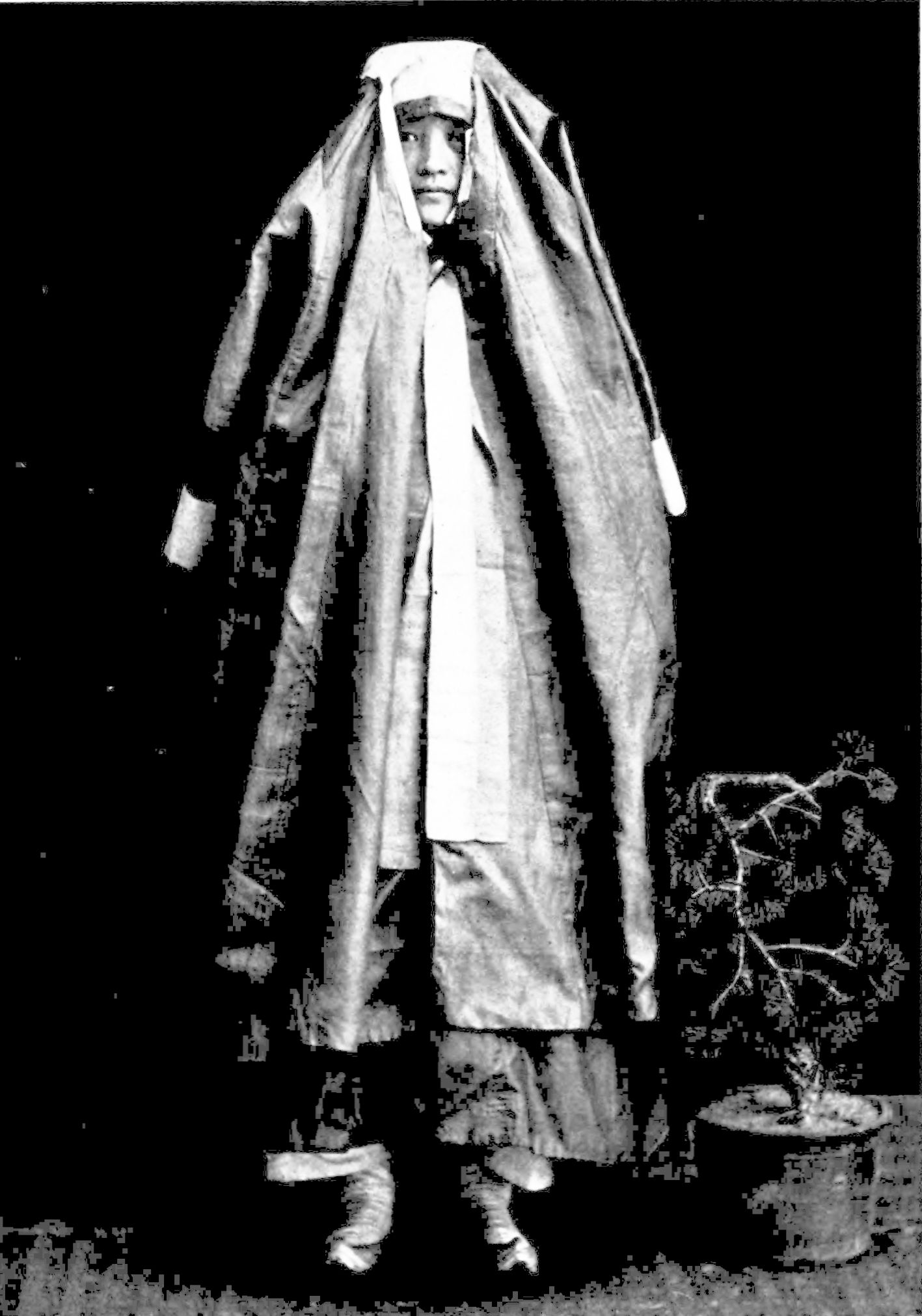
1906 photo described by the knowledgeable photographer, Homer Hulbert, as suitable respectable attire for the street. These were traditionally of green silk.

During the Goryeo dynasty women had considerable freedom. They could freely mingle with men, have their own possessions, and inherit land. That changed drastically during the second half of the Joseon era after the Imjin War, as women's situation became gradually worse. Their life was regulated by Neo-Confucianism but in a much stricter way than in China, where the philosophy originated. This change in society based on Chinese-influenced Neo-Confucianism can be correlated to an increasingly clan-based patrilineal focus on lines of male descent resulting in the printing of chokpo (genealogies) from 1600 onwards. The ensuing shift in social ideology from 1650 onwards has been described as striking.

Women had to conform to Confucian ideals. As children they were subordinated to their fathers, when they married, to their husbands, and when they became elderly, to their firstborn sons. Being virtuous, which for women meant modesty, obedience and faithfulness, was required of them; virtuous women were rewarded by the state from 1434 with gradations in status and financial support. Yangban noblewomen were completely segregated from the rest of society. During the day they could not leave their homes, and if they had to, they were transported in a litter called gama (가마). They were forbidden to play games and have fun outside their homes; if they did so they could be beaten with a stick called a gangjo. These ideals and segregation could not completely be maintained into the lower classes, for commoner and slave women had various tasks and duties to perform. Nevertheless, even the peasant houses had separate rooms for men and women, and wealthier families had male and female quarters: "outer rooms" called sarangchae (사랑채) for men, and "inner rooms" called anchae (안채) or anbang (안방; 內房) for women. By the end of the Joseon dynasty, low-class woman who had fulfilled their Neo-Confucian duties of bearing a son bared their breasts in public as a sign of pride, while noblewomen were forbidden from doing so because it was considered to be "low-class". However, many scholars doubt the veracity of the evidence for this trend.

Most women were illiterate, as the public schools taught males exclusively. Even after the introduction of hangul, when literacy improved, only 4% of women could read and write as late as the 19th century. Women of the yangban could receive an education from within the family; for example, the 18th-century Crown Princess Lady Hyegyeong was taught to read and write hangul by an aunt-in-law. There were various women philosophers who wrote in favor of patriarchy, such as Im Yungjidang and Gang Jeongildang, though the modern feminist interpretation is that such women were only pretending. Women were not allowed to learn hanja, the Chinese characters used to write Korean. Women were also denied the right to participate in the jesa, the ancestor honoring rituals, which is also a significant divergence from the original Chinese practices.

Households headed by women disappeared at the beginning of the Joseon era, and they gradually lost their right to inheritance, as well. The reason was that marrying daughters off required expensive dowries, resulting in calling daughters dodungnyeo (도둑녀), "thieves". According to the neo-Confucian ideals, women had to obey their in-laws after marriage, and the birth family regarded it unnecessary to provide a daughter her inheritance in addition to the expensive dowry. Married daughters were often labelled chulga oein (출가외인; 出嫁外人), "one who left the family and became an outsider". Women had to obey their husbands and in-laws and had no right to apply for divorce. Men could divorce their wives based on the chilgeojiak (칠거지악), the "seven sins": disobedience towards in-laws, inability to bear a son, adultery, jealousy, genetic disease, talkativeness, and kleptomania.

Women were expected to be faithful to their husbands beyond death, so widows were not allowed to remarry in the latter part of the dynasty. In lower classes such marriages still happened, as families, for financial reasons, or personal vendettas, married off the burdensome widows to men who could not afford to marry otherwise. While the breaking of the rule in lower classes was widely ignored by authorities, yangban widows were forbidden to remarry, or their children would be cast out of the noble class. Members of the royal lineage were treated even more strictly, with Seongjong of Joseon ordering the execution of his cousin when he discovered she had cohabited with a male servant after being widowed, implying their sharing of the bed meant they were engaged in sexual activities. As women could not be the heads of a household anymore, widows often were considered financial burdens and sometimes driven to kill themselves. Women were expected to protect their virtue at any cost, and by the late Joseon era they often wore small knives called paedo (패도; 佩刀) attached to the norigae (the colourful pendant hanging from the upper part of the hanbok), to take their lives rather than dishonor their families even by giving cause for gossip.

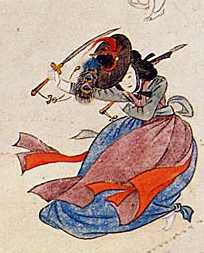
Gisaeng performing a sword dance. The gisaeng were highly trained from childhood. This is part of an 1805 painting by Sin Yun-bok (1758–1813).

Men were allowed to have second wives besides their first wife as well as concubines. Being a second wife or a concubine of a nobleman was considered to be higher on the social ladder than commoner or slave women, but their children were considered illegitimate and denied any yangban rights. First wives and legitimate children of noblemen often despised these women. Society considered these children outcasts unless they were literal royalty, in which case they were honored and feared.

Women could only have four types of "professions" in Joseon: they could become gungnyeo (palace women), shamans, physicians or gisaeng. The latter, who are often compared to Japanese geisha, could live a freer life than most women and often likened themselves to floating butterflies or wild dogs in their poems. They could read and write, were skilled in music, arts, poetry and served as intellectual companions to men in a period where wives were not considered to be true companions. The most famous gisaeng is probably Hwang Jin-yi, who lived in the 16th century and is considered a role model of progressive, liberal, strong, feminist, self-conscious women in Korea.

Women physicians are rarely discussed in modern discourse because of the lack of scandalous stories surrounding them and interest in what Joseon did well, a phenomenon criticized as a form of Orientalism.

Joseon-era laws prohibited women from riding horses and playing games such as go. By custom, houses had two entrances (one only for men, another only for women) and the kitchen provided a physical separation between each gender's quarters. To ensure separation outside the home, certain hours of the day were marked by a ringing bell, this notified the times when only women would be allowed on the streets. Even women from the upper-class were expected to live in houses with high walls to reduce exposure to other men. However, lower-class women worked with men in the fields, most often on family farms.

By the end of the era, married women were mostly referred to by their husband's or children's names ("...'s wife", "...'s mother"). This is different from the English language use of the married designation "Mrs", denoting a woman's married status.

In the late nineteenth century, the lowest order of women participated openly in the new year fighting (sanctioned during the first moon of the new year) occasioned where debts had not been paid by the end of the old year or the 15 days' grace following it. Fighting for other grudges also took place between men, bodies of trades, whole villages or companies of children. Betting on women's fights was common. However, neither women nor men of the upper orders fought, or at most a male aristocrat might use a champion to fight behind closed walls.

=== Notable Joseon women ===
Listed in descending order of year of death, with the latest first:

- Empress Myeongseong (1851–1895), also known in her time as "Queen Min", queen consort of Korea assassinated in 1895.
- Kang Jeongildang (1772–1832), poet and published letter-writer. She supported her scholar husband by knitting.
- Lee Bingheogak (1759–1824), aristocratic scholar and published author of poetry and two large encyclopaedias. Copies of some of her work, known by name, were rediscovered in the period 1939–2004.
- Seo Yeongsuhap (1753–1823), member of a powerful aristocratic family, mathematician and poet of renown and substantial portfolio.
- Lady Hyegyeong of the Pungsan Hong clan (1735–1816), aristocratic bride of mentally-ill Crown Prince Sado who was put to death for his actions. She authored a chilling account of her life as a terrorised royal wife, The Memoirs of Lady Hyegyeong.
- Gim Man-deok (1739–1812), businesswoman and philanthropist whose action of releasing rice to the starving caused her to be celebrated.
- Im Yunjidang (1721–1793), Neo-Confucian scholar, philosopher and author, came from a poor yangban family. Her biography was written by her younger brother.
- Royal Noble Consort Sukbin Choe (1670–1718) began life as a water-bearing palace slave and ended it as a favourite concubine of the King, Sukjong of Joseon. The Ihyeon Palace in Seoul was gifted to her. She was the mother of a king, King Yeongjo.
- Kim Gae-si "Court Lady Kim" (d. 1623), palace maid who rose to control matters of state but who was beheaded eventually.
- Julia Ota (last known in 1622), aristocratic woman captured as a girl, and taken to Japan where she became a prominent evangelising Christian much revered especially in Izu Ōshima where she has her own Shinto shrine.
- Hwang Jini or Hwang Jin-yi (1506–1567), gisaeng and acclaimed poet also famed for her riddles. She has inspired many modern popular dramas.
- Princess Yi Gu-ji (d. 1489), executed for having a scandalous sexual relationship with her slave after she had been widowed.
