= Naehun =

First Korean-language book by a woman

Naehun Instructions for Women
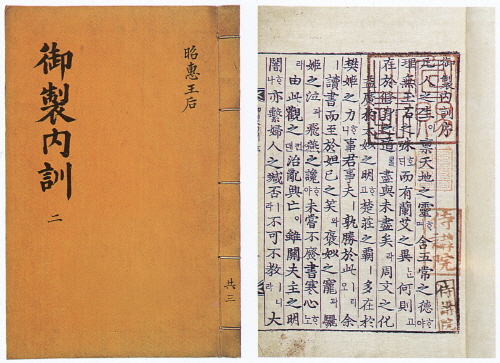
- First book written by a woman in Hangul, 1475; National Treasure of South Korea
- Author: Queen Sohye of the Cheongju Han clan 7 October 1437 – 11 May 1504
- Language: Korean, Chinese
- Genre: Morality handbook
- Publication date: 1475
- Publication place: Korea, Joseon Dynasty
- Media type: Book

Naehun (Korean: 내훈; Hanja: 內訓; lit. 'Instructions for Women') is a guidebook for women and the first known book written by a female author in Korea. It is one of the most representative books that reflects the social construction of gender and sexuality based on neo-Confucian ideals in premodern East Asia. It is also a unique historical source material, with various Korean royal court vocabulary describing appropriate behavior for a woman in accordance with neo-Confucian values.

== Background ==
This is an instruction book for women published in 1475 (6th year of Seongjong's reign) written by Queen Insu (posthumously honoured as Queen Sohye; 7 October 1437 – 11 May 1504), the wife of Crown Prince Uigyeong and a member of the Cheongju Han clan, who was appointed as the Queen Dowager in 1475.

She regretted that there were no educational books that women could read easily at that time, and wrote this book by extracting the key points of the women's discipline from four Chinese classical books for women: Biographies of Exemplary Women, Lesser learning, Mingxin Baojian and Chinese Introduction for Women.

Naehun is the oldest known surviving work by a Korean female writer and shows the effects of the Confucian social values on women's status during the Joseon period.

It was published several times, during different periods, and the notation, vocabulary and writing style changed as well, making it an important resource for the study of the Korean medieval language.

== Tomb of Queen Sohye ==
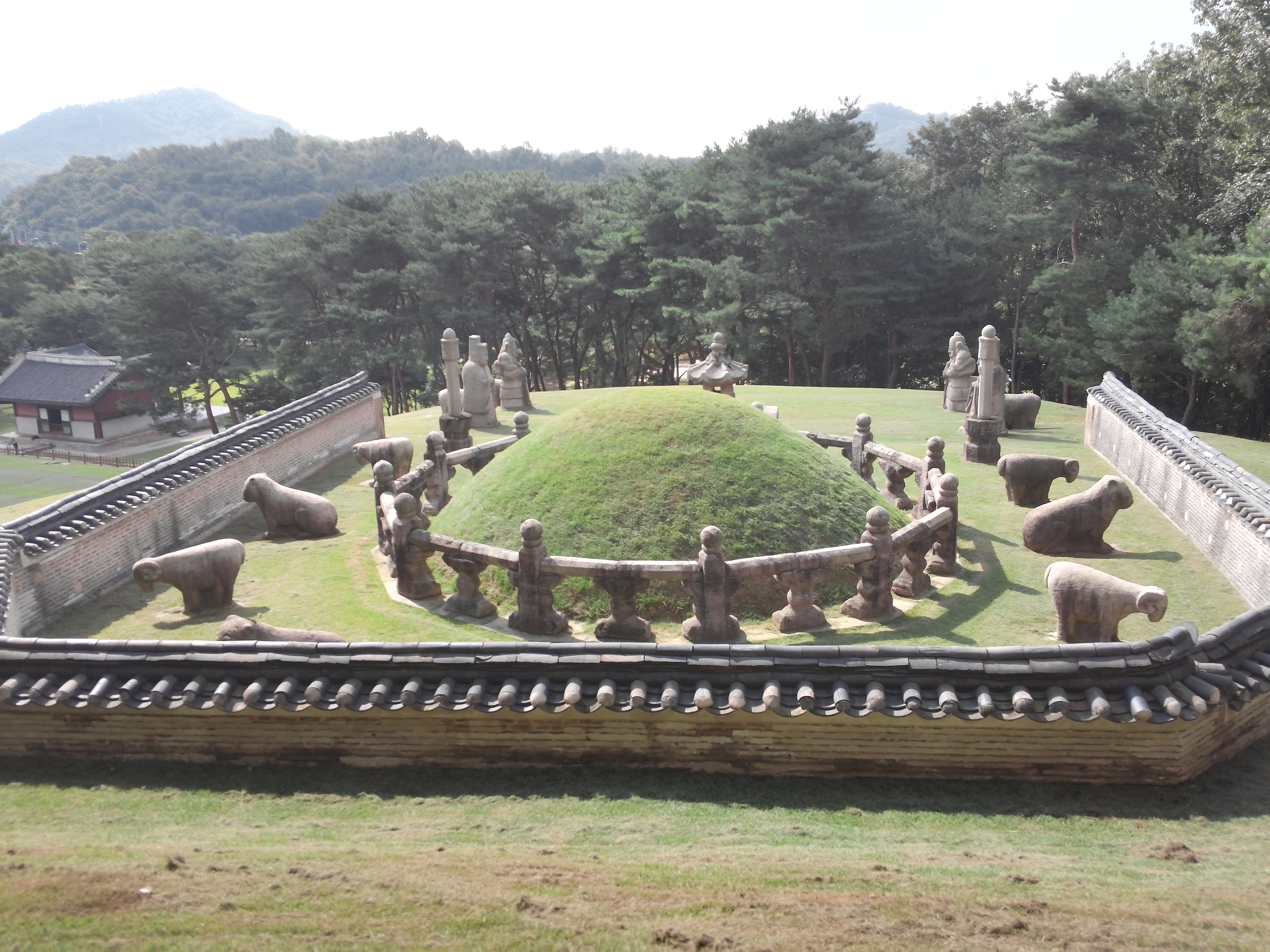
Gyeongneung (敬陵), Tomb of King Deokjong and Queen Sohye

In a royal tomb in the form of Dongwoni Gangneung, the tomb of the King is on the left and the tomb of the Queen is on the right. Nevertheless, in Gyeongneung, the tomb of Queen Sohye is on the left, and the tomb of King Deokjong (also known as Crown Prince Uigyeong), is on the right. The reason is that Deokjong died at the age of 20, while he was still the Crown Prince, but Queen Sohye died at the age of 68 under the status of Grand Royal Queen Dowager (대왕대비; 大王大妃), so regardless of gender, her status was higher than that of her husband.

== The Book ==
At the beginning of the book is the Queen's letter of Instruction (내훈) and the list. The book is composed of 3 volumes and 7 chapters.

VOLUME 1

언행 – Onhaeng: Speech and Comportment
효친 – Hyochin: Filial Piety
혼례 – Hollye: Bond of Marriage

VOLUME 2

부부 (夫婦) – Bubu: Husband and Wife

VOLUME 3: Parents, Mother, Cordiality, Frugality

모의 (母儀) – Moui: Motherly Rectitude
돈목 (敦睦) – Donmok: Cordiality in Sibling Relationships
염검 (廉儉) – Yeomgeom: Integrity and Frugality

=== Queen Sohye's preface ===
All persons at birth receive the spirit of Heaven and Earth, and all are endowed with the virtues of the Five Relations.

There is no difference in the principle of jade and stone.

But yet how is it that orchids and wormwood differ?

It depends on whether or not you have done your best to fulfill the Way of cultivating yourself.

The civilizing transformation of King Wen of Zhou was enhanced and broadened by the brightness of his consort Tai Si.

The hegemony enjoyed by King Zhuang of Chu was largely due to the efforts of his consort Fan Ji.

Who could do more to serve her King or her husband?

The order and disorder, the rise and fall of a country are related to the wisdom and ignorance of men, but are also closely tied to the goodness and badness of women.

Therefore women must be taught well [...].

== See also ==
- Society in the Joseon Dynasty
- Women in China
- Women in Japan

== Additional reading ==
- Ko, Dorothy; Haboush, JaHyun Kim; Piggott, Joan, eds. (2003). Women and Confucian Cultures in Premodern China, Korea, and Japan. University of California Press. ISBN 9780520231382. 250 pages.
- Duncan, John (2015). "The Naehun and the Politics of Gender in Fifteenth-Century Korea". In Young-Key Kim-Renaud (ed.). Creative Women of Korea: The Fifteenth Through the Twentieth Centuries. pp. 26–57. doi:10.4324/9781315705378. ISBN 9780765639943.
- "Royal Tombs". Cultural Heritage Administration.<
- Eunkang, Koh (2008). "Is Confucianism Incompatible with Gender Equality in South Korea?". Bulletin of the School of Oriental and African Studies, University of London. 71 (2, Scripture and Modernity: A Tribute to Professor John Wansbrough). Cambridge University Press: 345–362. doi:10.1017/S0041977X08000578. JSTOR 40378774.
