= Martina Deuchler =

Swiss Koreanist (born 1935)

Martina Deuchler (born 1935 in Zurich) is a Swiss academic and author. She was a professor of Korean studies at the SOAS University of London from 1991 to 2001.

== Profile ==
Martina Deuchler developed her interest in Korea by way of Chinese and Japanese studies. She was educated in Leiden, Harvard and Oxford, at a time when Korea was still hardly known in the West. As one of the first Western scholars, Martina Deuchler studied Korean history and published a number of key works: Confucian Gentlemen and Barbarian Envoys (1977), The Confucian Transformation of Korea (1992), and Under the Ancestors' Eyes (2015). With her original scholarly work, combining history with social anthropology, Martina Deuchler created a framework for exploring Korean social history, within which she continues to research landed elites and their perception of the historic changes in East Asia at the end of the nineteenth century. As Korean studies emerged as an academic field in the second half of the twentieth century, Martina Deuchler, generously supported by the Swiss National Science Foundation, contributed to the networking among Korea specialists isolated in a few European universities and was one of the founding members of the Association for Korean Studies in Europe (AKSE) in 1977. She participated in numerous scholarly workshops and conferences a few of which she herself organized. As Professor of Korean Studies at the School of Oriental and African Studies, University of London from 1988 to her retirement in 2000, she dedicated herself to educating future generations of Koreanists and advancing Korean Studies as an academic field. She continues to be active as researcher and consultant.

== Education ==
Martina Deuchler studied classical and modern Chinese language and history as well as classical and modern Japanese language and literature at Leiden University, NL, from 1954 to 1959. She received her B.A. in Chinese and Japanese with honors in 1957. From 1959 to 1963 she continued her studies of modern history of China and Japan as a scholarship student in the Regional Area Program in East Asia of Harvard University. Her advisers were Prof. John K. Fairbank and Prof. Edwin O. Reischauer. She received a PhD in History and Far Eastern Languages with a dissertation entitled "The Opening of Korea, 1875–1884" in 1967. Supported by the Swiss National Science Foundation, she studied social anthropology with Prof. Maurice Freedman at Oxford University in 1972. In October 1979 she presented a second dissertation (Habilitation) with the title "Confucianism and the Social Structure of Early Yi Korea" to the University of Zurich and was awarded the Venia legendi for Classical Sinology and Korean Studies.

== Activities ==
1967–1969	Research in Korea as research fellow in East Asian studies, Harvard University
1973–1975	Research in Korea as part of the SNSF project „History of Korea"
1978–1988	Elected member of the Board of the Swiss Society of Asian Studies (Schweizerische Gesellschaft für Asienkunde)
1983–1986	Member of the Committee on Korean Studies (CKS) of the Association for Asian Studies (AAS), Ann Arbor, Michigan
1983–1988	President of the Schweizerische Gesellschaft für Asienkunde
1975–1988	Teaching Korean history and language, University of Zurich
1980–1983	Member of the Joint Committee on Korean Studies of the Social Science Research Council and the American Council of Learned Societies (SSRC/ACLS)
1987–1988	Elected member of the Research Council of the Swiss Academy of Sciences, Berne
1988–1991	Senior Lecturer for Korean Studies, School of Oriental and African Studies (SOAS), University of London
1989–1998	Chair of the Centre for Korean Studies, School of Oriental and African Studies (SOAS)
1991–1993	President of the Association for Korean Studies in Europe (AKSE)
1991–2001	Professor of Korean Studies, School of Oriental and African Studies (SOAS), University of London
2000	Member of the Visiting Committee on East Asian Studies (Board of Overseers of Harvard College), Harvard University. Responsible for the Korea program
2001	Visiting Professor of Korean History at Cornell University
2002–2005	Member of the International Advisory Committee of the Korea Foundation
2004	Member of the Visiting Committee on East Asian Studies (Board of Overseers of Harvard College), Harvard University. Responsible for the Korea program
2004	Visiting Professor, Academy of Korean Studies, Seoul
2006	Member of the Visitatie Commissie Niet–Westerse Talen en Culturen, Leiden University; responsible for the Korea program
2002–2014	Research Professor, Centre for Korean Studies, School of Oriental and African Studies SOAS, London
2008–2009	Visiting Professor of Korean History at Sŏgang University, Seoul

== Research ==
Martina Deuchler has conducted intensive research in Korea for over fifty years. Due to the fact that in the 1960s there were few historical sources on Korea in Western libraries, she went to Korea to study in the former royal library (Kyujanggak) from 1967 to 1969. The result of this two-year stay was the publication of Confucian Gentlemen and Barbarian Envoys (1977), a history of Korea's diplomatic opening by Japan and the Western powers at the end of the nineteenth century.

At that time, Martina Deuchler also conducted fieldwork on Confucian ritualism, especially ancestor worship. Thanks to her affinal relations through her husband, Dr. Ching Young Choe, she was granted unique access to social and religious traditions and ceremonies, rarely witnessed by Westerners, in a remote rural area in North Gyeongsang Province. She documented her observations in numerous color slides. In 1972 she moved to Oxford University to study social anthropology with Maurice Freedman. During a second sojourn from 1973 to 1975 she expanded her knowledge of Korea's social history with archival and field research. This resulted in a major, highly acclaimed work, The Confucian Transformation of Korea (1992). This book, translated into Korean and partly into Japanese, focuses on the influence Chinese Neo-Confucianism exercised on Korean society of the Joseon period (1392–1910). It documents the stages by which Neo-Confucianism, as a socio-political ideology, transformed the originally bilateral Korean society into a patrilineal one.

After many more years of research on social and intellectual history, in particular Korean Neo-Confucianism, and sustained dialogue with Korean scholars, she published Under the Ancestors' Eyes in 2015. This work argues that Korean elite society was structured on the basis of descent groups throughout its long history, and actually up to this day. In premodern Korea, therefore, it was social origin (i.e., birth and descent) rather than political office that served to identify elite status. The research materials of Martina Deuchler are since 2017 preserved in the Ethnographic Museum of University of Zurich.

== Selected works ==
- "Neo-Confucianism in Early Yi Korea: Some Reflections on the Role of Ye," Korea Journal Vol.15, Nr.5 (May 1975): 12–18. Reprinted in Korean Philosophy: Its Tradition and Modern Transformation, ed. Korean National Commission for UNESCO. Elizabeth, N.J. and Seoul: Hollym, 2004, pp. 43–54.
- "Koreanische Musik" (in collaboration with Lee Hye-gyu) in Die Musik in Geschichte und Gegenwart. Kassel: Bärenreiter Verlag, 1980. Second printing in Aussereuropäische Musik in Einzeldarstellungen. München and Kassel: dtv and Bärenreiter Verlag, 1980.
- Confucian Gentlemen and Barbarian Envoys: The Opening of Korea, 1875-1885. Seattle: University of Washington Press, 1977. 310 pp. Second printing: 1983.
- "The Tradition: Women during the Yi Dynasty." In Virtues in Conflict: Tradition and the Korean Woman Today. Ed. by Sandra Mattielli. Seoul: Royal Asiatic Society, 1977. pp. 1–47. Second printing: 1983.
- "Neo-Confucianism: The Impulse for Social Action in Early Yi Dynasty Korea, "The Journal of Korean Studies 2 (1980): 71-111.
- "Self-cultivation for the Governance of Men: The Beginnings of Neo-Confucian Orthodoxy in Yi Korea," Asiatische Studien XXXIV.2 (1980): 9-39.
- "Reject the False and Uphold the Straight: Attitudes Toward Heterodox Thought in Early Yi Korea." In The Rise of Neo-Confucianism in Korea. Ed. by Th. William de Bary and JaHyun Kim Haboush. New York: Columbia University Press, 1985. pp. 375–410.
- "Neo-Confucianism in Action: Agnation and Ancestor Worship in Early Yi Korea." In Religion and Ritual in Korean Society. Ed. by Laurel Kendall and Griffin Dix. Institute of East Asian Studies, University of California, Berkeley: Korea Research Monograph 12, 1987. pp. 26–55.
- The Confucian Transformation of Korea. A Study of Society and Ideology. Harvard-Yenching Institute Monograph, No. 36. Cambridge, Massachusetts: Council on East Asian Publications, Harvard University, 1992. 439 pages. Paperback edition, 1994. ISBN 0-674-16088-6. Korean translation: Han'guk sahoe ŭi yugyojŏk pyŏnhwan. Trsl. by Yi Hun-sang. Seoul: Acanet, 2003. Second Korean edition: Seoul: Nŏmŏ puksŏ, 2013.
- Culture and the State in Late Chosôn Korea. Coedited with JaHyun Kim Haboush. Harvard East Asian Monograph 182, Harvard-Hallym Series. Cambridge, Massachusetts: Harvard University Asia Center, 1999. ISBN 0-674-17982-X.
- "The Practice of Confucianism: Ritual and Order in Chosŏn-Dynasty Korea." In Rethinking Confucianism: Past and Present in China, Japan, Korea, and Vietnam. Ed. by Benjamin Elman, John B. Duncan, and Herman Ooms. Los Angeles: UCLA Asian Pacific Monograph Series, University of California, Los Angeles, 2002. pp. 292–334. ISBN 1-883191-06-8
- "Propagating Female Virtues in Chosŏn Korea." In Women and Confucian Cultures in Premodern China, Korea, and Japan. Ed. by Dorothy Ko, JaHyun Kim Haboush, and Joan R. Piggott. Berkeley: University of California Press, 2003. pp. 142–169. ISBN 0-520-23105-8 (cloth); ISBN 0-520-23138-4 (paper).
- "Abstract History of the Kwangsan Kim." In Kugyŏk Och'ŏn se'go (Translation of Och'ŏn se'go into modern Korean), Andong: Han'guk kughak chinhŭngwŏn, 2005. 2 vols.
- Under the Ancestors' Eyes: Kinship, Status, and Locality in Premodern Korea. Harvard East Asian Monographs 378. Cambridge, Massachusetts: Harvard University Asia Center, 2015. ISBN 978-0-674-50430-1
- "Kimchi-Erinnerungen an Südkorea." In S(e)oul food. Koreanisch-kulinarische Erinnerungen mit Bildern von Cookie Fischer-Han. Ed. by Mareile Flitsch. Zürich: Völkerkundemuseum der Universität Zürich, 2016. pp. 64–67.

In a statistical overview derived from writings by and about Martina Deuchler, OCLC/WorldCat encompasses roughly 18 works in 56 publications in 4 languages and 1,694 library holdings.

== Honors ==
1993	Wiam Chang Chi-yŏn Memorial Award for Korean Studies
1995	Reischauer Memorial Lectures at Harvard University
1995	Order of Cultural Merit (Eun-Gwan, Silver Crown), Republic of Korea
2001	George L. Paik Scholarship Award (Yongjae haksulsang) der Yonsei University, Institute of Korean Studies, Seoul
2001	Citation of Appreciation for "outstanding contribution to the development of Korean Studies in the World" from Korea Foundation, Seoul
2006	Elected Corresponding Fellow (H3) of the British Academy, FBA.
2008	Honorary Member of the British Association of Korean Studies (BAKS)
2008	First Korea Foundation Award for Contributions to Korean Studies
2009	Association for Asian Studies (AAS), Lifetime Achievement Award, 2009.
2011	Honorary Member of the Royal Asiatic Society, Korea Branch, Seoul
2018	Award Honorary degree by the Faculty of Humanities, University of Zurich
