= Queen Seonui =

Queen of Joseon from 1720 to 1724

Queen Seonui 선의왕후

Queen dowager of Joseon
- Tenure: 1724–1730
- Predecessor: Queen Dowager Hyesun
- Successor: Queen Dowager Yesun

Queen consort of Joseon
- Tenure: 1720–1724
- Predecessor: Queen Inwon
- Successor: Queen Jeongseong

Crown Princess of Joseon
- Tenure: 1718–1720
- Predecessor: Crown Princess Shim
- Successor: Crown Princess Seo
- Born: 14 December 1705; Daehangno, Joseon
- Died: 12 August 1730 (aged 24); Eojodang Hall, Gyeonghui Palace, Joseon
- Burial: Uireung
- Spouse: Yi Yun, King Gyeongjong
Posthumous name
- Queen Seonui (선의왕후/宣懿王后)
- House: Hamjong Eo clan
- Father: Eo Yu-gu
- Mother: Internal Princess Consort Wanreung of the Jeonju Yi clan

Queen Seonui (Korean: 선의왕후; 14 December 1705 – 12 August 1730) of the Hamjong Eo clan, was the second wife of Yi Yun, King Gyeongjong, the 20th Joseon monarch. She was Queen of Joseon from 1720 until her husband's death in 1724, after which she was honoured as Royal Queen Dowager Gyeongsun (경순왕대비).

== Biography ==
The future queen was born on 14 December 1705 during the reign of King Sukjong. Her father, Eo Yu-Gu, was a member of the Hamjong Eo clan, and her mother was a member of the Jeonju Yi clan.

Her 4th cousin eventually married Lady Hyegyeong’s father's cousin, Hong Sang-han. They would eventually become the great-grandparents of Hong Hyeon-ju; the husband of Princess Sukseon, a daughter of King Jeongjo and Royal Noble Consort Su of the Bannam Park clan.

In 1718, when Lady Eo was 14 years old, she married the 30 year old Crown Prince Hwiso and was appointed as crown princess consort. When her husband ascended to the throne and became the 20th Joseon monarch (temple name: Gyeongjong) in 1720, she automatically became queen consort.

The King suffered ill health and was unable to produce an heir—or to do much of anything for that matter. During his reign, the Noron and Soron factions battled for power. The Soron faction were the ruling political faction and supported Gyeongjong, and the Noron faction supported his half-brother, Prince Yeoning. The Noron faction and his step-mother, Queen Dowager Hyesun pressured him to appoint Prince Yeoning as his heir.

According to one theory, the Queen opposed Prince Yeoning and planned to secretly adopt Prince Milpung (밀풍군, Milpung-Gun), the great-grandson of Crown Prince Sohyeon, King Injo's first son. However, two months after the King's enthronement, Prince Yeoning was installed as Crown Prince (Wangseje, 왕세제, 王世弟).

Gyeongjong later died in 1724 and the Queen was honoured as Queen Dowager Gyeongsun. Prince Yeoning succeeded his brother as the 21st Joseon monarch (temple name: Yeongjo). After she knowing that her family were suspected of an assassination attempt on Yeongjo, Gyeongsun was enraged and rejected all the food. She died of starvation in 1730 in Jeoseung Hall of Gyeonghui Palace.

She was posthumously given the title of Queen Seonui (선의왕후; 宣懿王后).

After her death, Jeoseung Hall was accommodated and converted into living quarters for Crown Prince Sado to which the name was changed to Chwiseondang (취선당), and was also a Soju room. In her memoir, Lady Hyegyeong stated that the reason why Crown Prince Sado's mental state worsened or started was because of the ominous environment that the hall living quarters had; Royal Noble Consort Hui, Gyeongjong's mother, was executed in the hall in 1701, and Queen Seonui died 29 years later in the same hall.

== Family ==
Parent

- Father − Eo Yu-Gu (어유구; 魚有龜; 18 April 1675 – 16 January 1740)
- Mother
  - Step - Internal Princess Consort Jeonseong of the Jeonui Lee clan (증 전성부부인 전의 이씨; 贈 全城府夫人 全義 李氏; 1673–1692)
  - Biological - Internal Princess Consort Wanreung of the Jeonju Yi clan (완릉부부인 전주 이씨; 贈 完陵府夫人 全州 李氏; 1680–?); Eo Yu-gu's second wife
  - Step - Internal Princess Consort Sangsan of the Sangsan Kim clan (상산부부인 김씨; 商山府夫人 金氏; ?–1754)

Sibling

- Older sister - Lady Eo of the Hamjong Eo clan (어씨; 1692–1751)
- Older half-sister − Lady Eo of the Hamjong Eo clan (어씨)
- Older sister − Lady Eo of the Hamjong Eo clan (어씨)
- Younger half-sister − Lady Eo of the Hamjong Eo clan (어씨)
- Younger sister − Lady Eo of the Hamjong Eo clan (어씨; 1710–?)
- Younger brother - Eo Seok-jeong (어석정; 魚錫定; 1731–1763)
- Younger half-brother - Eo Seok-nyeong (어석녕; 魚錫寧)

Consort

- Husband − Yi Yun, King Gyeongjong (조선 경종; 20 November 1688 – 11 October 1724) — No issue.
  - Father-in-law − Yi Sun, King Sukjong (숙종대왕; 1661–1720)
  - Mother-in-law − Jang Ok-jeong, Royal Noble Consort Hui of the Indong Jang clan (희빈 장씨)

== In popular culture ==
- Portrayed by Kim Hye Wok in the 1988 MBC TV series 500 Years of Joseon:Queen In Hyun
- Portrayed by Hong Ye-jin in the 2016 SBS TV series The Royal Gambler
- Portrayed by Song Ji-in in the 2019 SBS TV series Haechi

Queen Seonui Hamjong Eo clan
Royal titles
Preceded by Queen Inwon of the Gyeongju Kim clan	Queen consort of Joseon; 1720–1724	Succeeded by Queen Jeongseong of the Daegu Seo clan
Preceded by Queen Dowager Hyesun (Inwon) of the Gyeongju Kim clan	Queen dowager of Joseon; 1724–1730	Succeeded by Queen Dowager Yesun (Jeongsun) of the Gyeongju Kim clan
