= Gyeongjong of Joseon =

King of Joseon from 1720 to 1724

Gyeongjong

King of Joseon
- Reign: 12 July 1720 – 11 October 1724
- Enthronement: 17 July 1720; Sungjeongjeon, Gyeonghuigung
- Predecessor: Sukjong
- Successor: Yeongjo

Regent of Joseon
- Tenure: 5 September 1717 – 12 July 1720
- Monarch: Sukjong

Crown Prince of Joseon
- Tenure: 21 July 1690 – 12 July 1720
- Predecessor: Crown Prince Sun
- Successor: Crown Prince Haeng
- Born: 20 November 1688; Chwiseondang, Changgyeonggung, Hanseong, Joseon
- Died: 11 October 1724 (aged 35); Hwanchwijeon, Changgyeonggung, Hanseong, Joseon
- Burial: Uireung, Seoul, South Korea
- Spouses: Queen Danui (m. 1696; died 1718) Queen Seonui (m. 1718)
Names
- Yi Yun (이윤; 李昀)
Era dates
- Adopted the era name of the Qing dynasty (Note: Ganghui (Kangxi) (강희; 康熙): 1720–1722 Ongjeong (Yongzheng) (옹정; 雍正): 1723–1724)
Posthumous name
- Joseon: Great King Gakgong Deokmun Ikmu Sunin Seonhyo (각공덕문익무순인선효대왕; 恪恭德文翼武純仁宣孝大王); Qing dynasty: Gakgong (각공; 恪恭)
Temple name
- Gyeongjong (경종; 景宗)
- Clan: Jeonju Yi
- Dynasty: Yi
- Father: King Sukjong
- Mother: Concubine Hui (biological); Queen Inhyeon (adoptive)
- Religion: Confucianism (Neo-Confucianism)

Korean name
- Hangul: 경종
- Hanja: 景宗
- Lit.: "Luminous Ancestor"
- RR: Gyeongjong
- MR: Kyŏngjong

Courtesy name
- Hangul: 휘서
- Hanja: 輝瑞
- RR: Hwiseo
- MR: Hwisŏ

Gyeongjong (Korean: 경종; Hanja: 景宗; 20 November 1688 – 11 October 1724), (Note: In the Korean calendar (lunisolar), he was born on the 28th day of the 10th lunar month and died on the 25th day of the 8th lunar month.) personal name Yi Yun, was the 20th monarch of Joseon. His father was King Sukjong and his biological mother was the infamous Concubine Hui.

== Biography ==
In 1690, Gyeongjong's designation as heir to the throne precipitated a struggle between the Noron faction, which supported his half-brother Prince Yeoning, and the Soron faction, which supported Gyeongjong of Joseon. Due to this struggle, Soron scholars were kept out of power and factional strife reached a high point during Gyeongjong's reign.

Following the death of King Sukjong in 1720, Crown Prince Hwiso (Yi Yun, 이윤 왕세자) ascended the throne at age 31 as King Gyeongjong. When Sukjong died in 1720, he supposedly told Yi Yi-myoung to name Yeoning-geum as Gyeongjong's heir, but suspicions arose between Soron, Noron enemies, from the absence of a historiographer or recorder.

Gyeongjong suffered from ill health during his reign, and the Noron political faction pressured Gyeongjong to step down in favor of his half-brother, Prince Yeoning. In 1720, two months after his enthronement, his half brother, Prince Yeoning (the future King Yeongjo) was installed as Crown Prince (wangseje, 왕세제, 王世弟) to handle state affairs, since the king's weak health made impossible for him to manage politics.

It is said that, Gyeongjong's mother, Lady Jang, was to blame for his illnesses. She was sentenced to death by poison, in 1701. Following the ruling, Lady Jang begged to see her son, the Crown Prince (later Gyeongjong). As she dashed towards him to greet him, she inflicted a severe injury to the Crown Prince's lower abdomen that left him sterile and unable to produce an heir. Owing to King Gyeongjong's fragile health, he had no energy or time to do anything significant in the four years of his reign.

This aggravated the power struggle and led to a big massacre, namely the Shinimsahwa (辛壬士禍). The Norons sent memorials to the king to no effect while the Sorons used this to their advantage—claiming the Noron faction were trying to usurp power and subsequently getting their rival faction removed from several offices. Members of the Soron faction then came up with an idea to assassinate the heir (Yeoning-geum) under the cover of hunting for a white fox said to be haunting the palace, but Queen dowager Inwon protected him and he was able to keep living, after this he said to the king he rather would go and live as a commoner.

During his four years reign, there were two major incidents of massacre; one is Sinchuk-oksa in which the ruling political party, Soron, swept the opposition Noron, a group that insisted that Gyeongjong's half-brother, Prince Yeoning, handle national affairs on behalf of the weak and ailing king during the first year of Gyeongjongreign 1720 and the other one is Imin-oksa which took place in the 2nd year of his reign, circa 1722. History calls both incidents as Sinim-sahwa. During his reign, he made small guns in imitation of the western weapons and reformed the land measurement system in the southern parts of the country.

King Gyeongjong died in 1724 and was entombed in the Cheonjangsan Mountain of Yangju. The title of the tomb was granted as the Uireung.

There was some speculation from Soron party members that his half-brother, Prince Yeoning, had something to do with his death due to the earlier attempt by the Noron faction to have him replace Gyeongjong on the throne, but several historiographers now conclude that he could have died of eating spoiled seafood, as described in Homer's book, The History of Korea. "But we may well doubt the truth of the rumour, for nothing that is told of that brother indicates that he would commit such an act, and in the second place a man who will eat shrimps in mid-summer, that have been brought thirty miles from the sea without ice might expect to die."

After his death, the chronicles of Gyeongjong's rule were published in 1732 under the reign of Yeongjo's reign. A few of Gyeongjong's youthful calligraphic works have also survived:

== Family ==
- Father: King Sukjong (숙종대왕; 7 October 1661 – 12 July 1720)
  - Grandfather: King Hyeonjong (현종대왕; 14 March 1641 – 17 September 1674)
  - Grandmother: Queen Myeongseong (명성왕후), of the Cheongpung Kim clan (청풍 김씨; 3 June 1642 – 11 January 1684)
- Biological mother: Concubine Hui (희빈), of the Indong Jang clan (인동 장씨; 3 November 1659 – 9 November 1701)
  - Grandfather: Jang Hyeong (장형; 1623–1669)
  - Grandmother: Lady, of the Papyeong Yun clan (파평 윤씨; 1626–1698)
- Adoptive mother: Queen Inhyeon (인현왕후), of the Yeoheung Min clan (여흥 민씨; 15 May 1667 – 16 September 1701)
- Stepmother: Queen Inwon (인원왕후), of the Gyeongju Kim clan (경주 김씨; 3 November 1687 – 13 May 1757)

Consort(s)

- Queen Danui (단의왕후), of the Cheongsong Shim clan (청송 심씨; 1 July 1686 – 8 March 1718)
- Queen Seonui (선의왕후), of the Hamjong Eo clan (함종 어씨; 3 December 1705 – 1 August 1730)

== Ancestry ==
Ancestors of Gyeongjong of Joseon

King Injo (인조대왕)
King Hyojong (효종대왕)
Queen Inyeol, of the Cheongju Han clan (인렬왕후 청주 한씨)
King Hyeonjong (현종대왕)
Jang Yu, Internal Prince Sinpung (신풍부원군 장유)
Queen Inseon, of the Deoksu Jang clan (인선왕후 덕수 장씨)
Internal Princess Consort Yeongga, of the (new) Andong Kim clan (영가부부인 신 안동 김씨)
King Sukjong (숙종대왕)
Kim Yuk (김육)
Kim U-myeong, Internal Prince Cheongpung (청풍부원군 김우명)
Lady, of the Papyeong Yun clan (파평 윤씨)
Queen Myeongseong, of the Cheongpung Kim clan (명성왕후 청풍 김씨)
Song Gu-taek (송국택)
Internal Princess Consort Deokeun, of the Eunjin Song clan (덕은부부인 은진 송씨)
Lady, of the Jinju Gang clan (진주 강씨)
King Gyeongjong
Jang Su (장수)
Jang Eung-in (장응인)
Jang Hyeong (장형)
Park Sim (박심)
Lady, of the Nampo Park clan (남포 박씨)
Concubine Hui, of the Indong Jang clan (희빈 인동 장씨)
Yun Seong-rib (윤성립)
Lady, of the Papyeong Yun clan (파평 윤씨)

== Gallery ==
=== Calligraphy by Gyeongjong ===
Written during his time as crown prince

Written in 1708

Written in 1713

== In popular culture ==
- Portrayed by Kim Sung-hwan in the 1988 MBC TV series 500 Years of Joseon: Queen Inhyeon.
- Portrayed by Lee Seung-hyung and Kwak Jung-wook in the 2002–2003 KBS2 TV series Royal Story: Jang Hui-bin.
- Portrayed by Yoon Chan in the 2010 MBC TV series Dong Yi.
- Portrayed by Hyun Woo in the 2016 SBS TV series The Royal Gambler.
- Portrayed by Han Seung-hyun in the 2019 SBS TV series Haechi.

== See also ==
- History of Korea
- List of monarchs of Korea
- Styles and titles in Joseon
- Politics of Joseon

== Notes ==
Gyeongjong of Joseon House of Yi Born: 20 November 1688 Died: 11 October 1724
Royal titles
Preceded by Sukjong	King of Joseon; 12 July 1720 – 11 October 1724	Succeeded by Yeongjo
