= Ŏudong =

Korean noblewoman (1442–1480)

- Korean name
- Hangul: 어우동, 어을우동
- Hanja: 於宇同, 於乙宇同
- RR: Eoudong, Eoeuludong
- MR: Ŏudong, Ŏŭrudong

Birth name
- Hangul: 박구마
- Hanja: 朴丘麻
- RR: Bak Guma
- MR: Pak Kuma

Ŏudong or Eoudong (Korean: 어우동; Hanja: 於宇同; 1442 – 18 October 1480), personal name Pak Guma, was a Korean dancer, writer, artist, and poet from a noble family during the Joseon period of dynastic Korea. Most of her work has not been preserved. Historical records remember her as one of the most infamous women of her time.

== Biography ==
Born as Pak Kuma (박구마; 朴丘麻), Ŏudong was from a noble family, the Eumseong Park clan. She married Yi Tong, Prince T'aegang (태강수 이동, 泰江守 李仝), the great-grandson of King Taejong and Queen Wongyeong. She was forced to divorce him on account of adultery charges and subsequently she became an active poet, writer, artist, and dancer.

She was noted for her exceptional beauty, dancing, singing talent, poetry, quick wit and charm, and extraordinary intellect.

=== Sex scandal and execution ===
In 1480, she was put on trial for adultery. She was charged with having committed adultery with multiple male partners, including royal relatives, court officials and slaves.

During this time period, the position of women deteriorated in Korea with the introduction of Confucian gender segregation, and there was an increasing severity in the persecution of women who committed adultery, and particularly noblewomen. Several such cases are known, such as those of Yu Kamdong, who was sentenced to become a slave kisaeng, and Kŭmŭmdong and Tongja, both noblewomen who were punished for having committed adultery with male relatives. Yi Kuji is an example of royal women committing adultery. The case of Ŏudong was perhaps the most infamous of all, and became a famous scandal involving many men of high standing. The case ended with her conviction and execution. The death penalty for female adultery was formally introduced by King Jungjong in 1513.

== Family ==
- Father
  - Pak Yunch'ang (박윤창; 朴允昌; 1420–?)
- Mother
  - Chŏng Kwidŏk (정귀덕; 鄭貴德; ? – 20 June 1488)
- Sibling(s)
  - Brother: Pak Sŏnggŭn (박성근; 朴成根; 1440 – 22 August 1488)
- Husband
  - Yi Tong (이동; 李仝)
    - Father-in-law: Yi Chŏng, Prince Yŏngch'ŏn (영천군 정; 1422 – ?)
    - Mother-in-law: Princess Consort, of the Yecheon Kwon clan (군부인 예천 권씨)
- Issue
  - Daughter: Yi Pŏnjwa (이번좌; 1462 – ?)
  - Unnamed son

== In popular culture ==
- Portrayed by Lee Bo-hee in the 1985 film Eoudong.
- Portrayed by Kim Muh-hee in the 1987 film Yohwa Eoeuludong.
- Portrayed by Kim Sa-rang in the 2007–2008 SBS TV series The King and I.
- Portrayed by Kang Eun-bi in the 2015 film Lost Flower Flower Uhwudong.

== See also ==
- Other notorious women of the Joseon period:
  - Deposed Queen Yun
  - Chang Noksu
  - Queen Munjeong
  - Jeong Nan-jeong
  - Kim Kaesi
  - Gwiin Jo
  - Huibin Jang
- Women in Joseon
- Society of Joseon
