= Yi Kuji =

Joseon princess and writer (fl. 15th century)

- Princess of Joseon
- Born: ? Seoul, Joseon
- Died: 7 March 1489; Seoul, Joseon
- Burial: Gwangju, South Korea
- Spouse: Kwŏn Tŏgyŏng
- Issue: Kwŏn Sŭngjung; Kwŏn Koam; Lady Chunbi
- House: House of Yi
- Father: Grand Prince Yangnyeong

Korean name
- Hangul: 이구지
- Hanja: 李仇之
- RR: I Guji
- MR: I Kuji

Princess Yi Kuji (Korean: 이구지 현주; Hanja: 李仇之 縣主; ? – 7 March 1489) was a Korean princess, writer, artist, and poet of the Joseon period. She was forced to commit suicide after it was discovered that she had cohabited with a slave after being widowed.

== Biography ==
Yi Kuji was an illegitimate daughter of Prince Yangnyeong, first son of the third Joseon king, Taejong of Joseon and Queen Wongyeong. Her mother was a palace slave of Crown Prince Yangnyŏng, whom he had two children with. She had an older sister.

Yi was given the title of County Princess (현주; 縣主) and married Kwŏn Tŏgyŏng (권덕영; 權德榮), a lesser official, and went to live in Gwangju, her husband's hometown. They had two sons and one daughter. Kwŏn died in 1470 and Yi was prevented from remarrying by social stigma, then by the issuing of the Anti-Remarriage Law of 1477.

=== Investigation ===
In 1475, it was reported to the Saheonbu that Yi had been cohabiting with Ch'ŏllye, her slave. Hŏ Kye (허계), the head department of the Saheonbu, requested that the situation be investigated without resorting to interrogation. He proposed that Ch'ŏllye be moved to his residence, where the man could be questioned. One official reported that his son travelling from Gwangju had heard rumours of an aristocratic lady who was liaising with a slave, while another official said that his servant had observed Ch'ŏllye sleeping and eating in the room next to his mistress' bedchamber. Seongjong, however, refused to arrest Yi based on gossip alone. This caused much dispute amongst officials on the policy of 'arresting regardless of suspicion', which some argued should apply only to common people and not the private affairs of an aristocratic lady.

In 1489, the Saheonbu reported that Yi Kuji had mothered a daughter by her slave, who had married the previous year. The officials now argued that, though any previous investigation had been dismissed, this was a case of public morality. Seongjong ordered that all servants be tortured to investigate the claim. Ch'ŏllye died during the interrogation and more than 40 people were arrested. Though some members of the government argued that death was too strong a punishment for a woman of the royal clan, it was agreed that death was more respectful than torture, and Yi was condemned. Yi’s daughter, Jun-bi, was not involved in her mother’s investigation as she had already left home in 1488, a year before Yi was executed, and was considered a part of her husband’s family.

== Posthumous ==
Yi was deleted from the royal family lineage (Sunwonrok) and her name remained taboo until the end of the Joseon Dynasty. Eoudong, Yu Gam-dong, Hwang Jin-yi, and Princess Consort Daebang (the aunt of Queen Jeongsun) are said to be examples of obscene women who did not stay faithful to a deceased husband during the Joseon Dynasty. In the 1970s, her name was found in the Veritable Records of the Joseon Dynasty during the production of a new Hangul version.

== Family ==
- Father - Yi Je, Grand Prince Yangnyeong (이제 양녕대군; 1394 – 7 September 1462)
  - Grandmother - Queen Wongyeong of the Yeoheung Min clan (원경왕후 민씨; 29 July 1365 – 18 August 1420)
  - Grandfather - King Taejong of Joseon (조선 태종; 13 June 1367 – 30 May 1422)
- Mother
  - Unnamed slave (before 1435 – ?)
- Sibling(s)
  - Older sister - Yi Mae (이매), Lady Yi of the Jeonju Yi clan (전주 이씨; 全州李氏; 1434 – ?)
    - Brother-in-law - Kwŏn Ch'ijung (권치중; 權致中; 1429–?) of the Andong Kwŏn clan
- Husbands and their children
  - Kwŏn Tŏgyŏng (권덕영; 權德榮) of the Andong Kwon clan (1453–1470); son of Kwŏn Ki (권기; 權琦; 1415–?)
    - Son - Kwŏn Sŭngjung (권승중; 權承重)
    - Son - Kwŏn Koam (권고암; 權高巖)
    - Daughter - Lady Kwŏn (권씨; 權氏; 1470 – ?)
  - Ch'ŏllye (천례; 天禮; ? – 4 October 1488)
    - Daughter - Chunbi (준비; 准非; 1473 – ?)

== See also ==
- Ŏudong
- Hwang Jini
- Shin Saimdang
- Heo Nanseolheon
