= Wŏn Ch'ŏnsŏk =

Korean intellectual (1330–?)

- Hangul: 원천석
- Hanja: 元天錫
- RR: Won Cheonseok
- MR: Wŏn Ch'ŏnsŏk

Art name
- Hangul: 운곡
- Hanja: 耘谷
- RR: Ungok
- MR: Un'gok

Courtesy name
- Hangul: 자정
- Hanja: 子正
- RR: Jajeong
- MR: Chajŏng

Wŏn Ch'ŏnsŏk (Korean: 원천석; Hanja: 元天錫, 1330-?), also known by his art name Ungok, was a hermit during the late Goryeo to early Joseon periods.

He is known for being the writer of Hŏhoga, a song of reminiscence of the past (i.e. Goryeo Dynasty) in the Ch'ŏnggu yŏngŏn, a collective edition of Korean traditional poems collected by Kim Ch'ŏngt'aek.

He was born in Kaegyŏng in 1330. He was a member of the Wonju Wŏn clan, and the son of Wŏn Yunjŏk (원윤적; 原尹迪). He was a bright child and excelled in school. He passed Jinsasi, a civil service exam in Goryeo when he was 27. However he was deterred from entering into government by the chaotic political circumstances in the late Goryeo. He once taught Yi Pangwŏn, who became King Taejong of Joseon Dynasty later. He was summoned several times and even paid a visit by Taejong himself when he took over the throne but Ungok refused to join the Cabinet. He lived in seclusion and remained as a man of integrity for all his life. In his later life, he became interested in Taoism as well as Buddhism even though he was a Confucian himself. He suggested the trinity of the three ideas called Sam-gyo-Il-Chi-ron. He wrote Ungok sisa, and edited Hwahaesajeon. Ungoksisa, reflected the society then and his philosophy as well. In the book, he argued the necessity to improve the system rather than replacing the dynasty and went on preaching that local officials should practice panel administration with mercy. Hŏ Mok, also known by his pen name Misu, once commented on Ungok's life "An honorable man never takes off his interest in the world even though he is hiding from the world".
