= Queen Danui =

First wife of Gyeongjong of Joseon (1686–1718)

Queen Danui 단의왕후
- Queen consort of Joseon (posthumously honored)

Crown Princess of Joseon
- Tenure: 20 May 1696 – 8 March 1718
- Predecessor: Crown Princess Kim
- Successor: Crown Princess Eo
- Born: 11 July 1686; Hoehyeon-dong, Hanseong, Joseon
- Died: 8 March 1718 (aged 31); Jangchunheon Hall, Changdeokgung, Hanseong, Joseon
- Burial: Hyereung 197, Donggureung-ro, Guri, Gyeonggi Province
- Spouse: Gyeongjong of Joseon
Posthumous name
- 공효정목단의왕후 (恭孝定穆端懿王后)
- House: Cheongsong Sim (by birth); Jeonju Yi (by marriage)
- Father: Sim Ho
- Mother: Internal Princess Consort Yeongwon of the Goryeong Park clan

- Queen Danui
- Hangul: 단의왕후
- Hanja: 端懿王后
- RR: Danui wanghu
- MR: Tanŭi wanghu

Queen Danui (Korean: 단의왕후; Hanja: 端懿王后, 11 July 1686 – 8 March 1718), of the Cheongsong Sim clan, was the first wife and princess consort of Crown Prince Hwiso, the future Gyeongjong of Joseon. She died before her husband's ascension to the throne.

== Biography ==
The future Queen Danui was born on 11 July 1686 from the Cheongsong Sim clan as the eldest child and daughter of Sim Ho and his wife, Lady Park of the Goryeong Park clan.

Through her father, Lady Sim was the 4th great-grandniece of Queen Insun, the wife of King Myeongjong, and the 9th great-grandniece of Queen Soheon, the wife of King Sejong and daughter of Sim On. She was also the 5th great-grandniece of Yi Ryang, a descendant of Grand Prince Hyoryeong, the son of King Taejong and Queen Wongyeong.

She was appointed as a Crown Princess (세자빈) when she married Crown Prince Yi Yun in 1696 at the age of 11.

She died on 8 March 1718, during the 44th year of Sukjong of Joseon's reign, two years before Crown Prince Yi Yun ascend the throne as Gyeongjong of Joseon. After Gyeongjong's sudden death, her younger brother Shim Yu-hyeon (심유현; 沈維賢) claimed that Gyeongjong was confined by Noron eunuchs and was then poisoned.

She was later posthumously named Queen Danui (단의왕후,端懿王后); adding Gonghyojeongmok (공효정목; 恭孝定穆) to her posthumous title when her husband became king. Her tomb is located on Hyereung 197, Donggureung-ro, Guri, Gyeonggi Province.

== Family ==
- Father - Sim Ho, Internal Prince Cheongeun (심호 청은부원군; 沈浩 靑恩府院君; 1668–1704)
- Mother - Internal Princess Consort Yeongwon of the Goryeong Park clan (영원부부인 고령 박씨; 靈原府夫人 高靈 朴氏; 1667–1735)
- Siblings
  - Younger sister - Lady Sim of the Cheongsong Sim clan (청송 심씨)
  - Younger brother - Sim Yu-Hyeon (심유현; 沈維賢; 1701–1728)
  - Adoptive younger brother - Sim Jun-Hyeon (심준현; 沈駿賢); second son of Sim Ok (심옥; 1675–1743)
- Husband - Gyeongjong of Joseon (조선 경종; 20 November 1688 – 11 October 1724) — No issue.

== In popular culture ==
- Portrayed by Woo Hee-jin in the 1988 MBC TV series 500 Years of Joseon: Queen Inhyeon
- Portrayed by Park Ji-mi in the 2002–3 KBS2 TV series Royal Story: Jang Hui-bin.

== See also ==
- Gyeongjong of Joseon
- Queen Seonui
