= Yohwa Eoeuludong =

Yohwa Eoludong
- Hangul: 요화 어을우동
- Hanja: 妖花於乙宇同
- RR: Yohwa eoeurudong
- MR: Yohwa ŏŭrudong
- Directed by: Kim Gi-hyun
- Written by: Kim Hyeong-jeong
- Starring: Kim Muh-hee; Park Geun-hyung; Guk Jeong-hwan
- Edited by: Hyun Dae-won
- Release date: May 23, 1987
- Running time: 90 minutes
- Country: South Korea
- Language: Korean

Yohwa Eoludong (Korean: 요화 어을우동) is a 1987 South Korean film about the incredible life of Joseon-era kisaeng writer, artist and poet Uhwudong directed by Kim Gi-hyun and starring Kim Muh-hee.The film was based on a novel by Yi won soo(異園樹).

== Plot summary ==
The story follows Eoludong (Uhwudong), a gisaeng, poet, writer, and artist who lived in 15th century Korea. Eoludong was a beautiful, talented, and intelligent young woman who was able to read and write well.

However, she was a divorced woman, which was not socially acceptable. She had no other choice but to become a gisaeng, and she used her position to gain favor with the noble classes.

== Cast ==
- Kim Muh-hee - Eoludong
- Park Geun-hyung
- Guk Jeong-hwan
