= Juan Cobo =

Spanish Dominican missionary, diplomat, astronomer and sinologist

Juan Cobo OP (Hokkien Chinese: 嗃呣𠿢; Pe̍h-ōe-jī: Ko-bó Soān) (ca. 1546–1592) was a Spanish Dominican missionary, diplomat, astronomer and sinologist.

Cobo was born in Alcázar de San Juan, known as "Alcázar de Consuegra" in the past. After becoming a priest of the Dominican order, he traveled to Mexico in 1586 and later to Manila in 1588. He was assigned by King Philip II to bring Christianity to China along with Miguel de Benavides. He translated into Chinese several works by Seneca and the Catechism. Circa 1590, he also translated from Chinese into Spanish the work Mingxin baojian (明心寶鑑) compiled by Fan Liben 范立本 in 1393 under the title Espejo rico del claro corázón o Beng Sim Po Cam, which was never published. Fidel Villarroel said that “El Padre Cobo fue el primer europeo que consiguió traducir un libro chino, el Beng Sim Po Cam” (“Father Cobo was the first European who managed to translate a Chinese book, the Beng Sim Po Cam”). Yet, there is debate about which one was the first translation into a European language.

In addition to this translation of Rich Mirror of the Good Heart (1590), Cobo's other contributions to Sino-Spanish production in the Philippines are the catechism Doctrina Christiana en letra y lengua china (Christian Doctrine) (1592–93), co-authored with Miguel de Benavides y Añoza; and the scientific theological text Bian zhengjiao zhenchuan shilu 辯正教真傳實錄 (Testimony of the True Religion), published in 1593, in Parian, the Chinese ghetto of Manila, under Cobo's name in Hokkien Chinese, 嗃呣𠿢 (Pe̍h-ōe-jī: Ko-bó Soān). This apology of Christianity is commonly known as Shilu and written in classical Chinese. Critics agree that Cobo could not have produced the Shilu without much help from educated Chinese. Who was the readership of the book is not clear. It has been said that perhaps the Shillu was not directed at the Chinese population of the Philippines who spoke another variety of Chinese (that which is Hokkien), but rather was a propaganda tool of the Dominican Order in the Spanish court and among educated Chinese. The book contains an entire section on European geographical knowledge. That is why Cobo also "has the distinction of being the first to introduce European philosophy and science to China, at least in print."

He was sent to Japan by the governor of Manila and received by Toyotomi Hideyoshi. He died in Taiwan when his boat sank during his return from Japan.

== See also ==
- Juan González de Mendoza (c. 1540–1617), a Spanish bishop in Mexico, whose 1585 book summarizes what the Spanish in the Philippines knew about China as of a few years before Juan Cobo's arrival to the islands.
- First book of the Spanish Philippines

== Works ==
- Carta de Juan Cobo del 13 de junio de 1589 a otros religiosos. Reprinted in Jose Antonio Cervera, ed. Cartas del Parian: Los chinos de Manila a finales del siglo XVI a través de loa ojos de Juan Cobo y Domingo de Salazar. (2015), pp. 84–101.
- Libro chino intitulado Beng Sim Po Cam, que quiere decir Espejo rico del claro corazón o Riquezas y espejo con que se enriquezca y donde se mire el claro y límpido corazón. Traducido en lengua castellana por fray Juan Cobo, de la orden de Santo Domingo. Dirigido al príncipe Don Felipe nuestro Señor (Manila, c. 1590). Available in the Biblioteca National, Madrid. There are several modern editions, see References.
- Bian zhengjiao zhenchuan shilu 辯正教真傳實錄 (Testimony of the True Religion), published in Manila, 1593. Available in the Biblioteca National, Madrid. Published in Shih-Lu: Apología de la verdadera religión = Testimony of the true religion; con introducciones por Alberto Santamaría, Antonio Domínguez, Fidel Villarroel; editado por Fidel Villarroel. Manila: University of Santo Tomás, 1986.
- The catechism Doctrina Christiana en letra y lengua china (Christian Doctrine) (1593), facsimile published by Jesús Gayo Aragón, O.P., in Doctrina Christiana: primer libro impreso en Filipinas, facsímile del ejemplar existente en la Biblioteca Vaticana. Manila: Real y Pontificia Universidad de Santo Tomás de Manila, 1951.
- Sententiae plures et graves philosophorum etiam gentilium ut Senecae et smilium ex eorum libris excertae et Sinicae reditae.
- Lingua sinica ad certam revocata methodum quatuor distinctis caracterum ordinibus generalibus, specificis et individualis; seu vocabularium sinensis.

== Bibliography ==
- Cervera, José Antonio, ed. Cartas del Parian: Los chino de Manila a finales del siglo XVI a través de loa ojos de Juan Cobo y Domingo de Salazar. México D.F.: Palabra de Clío, 2015. ISBN 978-607-97048-3-4
- Gil-Osle, Juan Pablo and Rachel Junlei Zhang. “‘Que ignores mi idioma no me espanto:’ A Spanish Sonnet in the Bian zhengjiao zhenchuan shilu 辯正教真傳實錄 by Fray Juan Cobo 高母羨.” Calíope: Journal of the Society for Renaissance and Baroque Hispanic Poetry 27.2 (2022): 231-48. DOI: 10.5325/CALIOPE.27.2.0231
- Innocente Hervás y Buendía, Diccionario histórico, biográfico y bibliográfico de la provincia de Ciudad Real, 1918, I, p. 41.
- Gayo Aragón, Jesus, O.P., in Doctrina Christiana: primer libro impreso en Filipinas, facsímile del ejemplar existente en la Biblioteca Vaticana. Manila: Real y Pontificia Universidad de Santo Tomás de Manila, 1951
- Gregorio Arnaiz, "Observaciones sobre la Embajada del Dominico P. Juan Cobo", Monumenta Nipponica, Vol. 2, núm. 2 (Jul., 1939), pp. 634–637.
- J. L. Alvarez, "Dos Notas Sobre la Embajada del Padre Juan Cobo", Monumenta Nipponica, Vol. 3, núm. 2 (Jul., 1940), pp. 657–664.
- José Antonio Cervera Jiménez, "Misioneros en Filipinas y su relación con la ciencia en China: Fray Juan Cobo y su libro Shi Lu", en Llull: Revista de la Sociedad Española de Historia de las Ciencias y de las Técnicas, Vol. 20, núm. 39, 1997, págs. 491–506, ISSN 0210-8615.
- José Eugenio Borao Mateo. “Un segundo manuscrito con la primera traducción al español de los cuatro libros confucianos hecha por Ruggieri, hallado en Taiwán.” Boletín de la Real Academia Española, vol. 101, no. 323, 2021, pp. 53–83.
- José Antonio Cervera Jiménez, "Relaciones entre España y China a través de Filipinas: Fray Juan Cobo y su aportación a la astronomía en el Extremo Oriente", en VV. AA., La enseñanza de las ciencias: una perspectiva histórica. Coord. por María Carmen Beltrán, Elena Ausejo Martínez, Vol. 1, 2003, págs. 117–130, ISBN 84-89584-07-9
- Liu Limei, Espejo rico del claro corazón. Traducción y Transcripción del texto chino por Fray Juan Cobo, (Letrúmero, Madrid, 2005)
- Liu Limei, La traducción castellana del libro chino Beng Sim Po Cam / Espejo rico del claro corazón, realizada por Juan Cobo c. 1590, tesis doctoral, 2003, Universidad Complutenese.
- Sanz, Carlos, Beng Sim Po Cam o Espejo Rico del Claro Corazón. Primer libro chino traducido en lengua española, por Fr. Juan Cobo, O.P. (a. 1592). Madrid: Victoriano Suárez, 1959.
- Villarroel, Fidel, O.P. editor. Pien Cheng-chiao Chen-ch’uan Shih-lu 辯正教真傳實錄. By Juan Cobo, Manila, Filipinas, U of Santo Tomas, 1986. Apología de la verdadera religión [Shih-lu 實錄] .
- Zhang, Rachel Junlei, and Juan Pablo Gil-Osle. “Chinese Monks, Dragons and Reincarnation: The Hand of Juan Cobo in the Cultural Translation of Mingxin baojian 明心寶鑑 (Precious Mirror for Enlightening the Mind), c. 1590.” Journal of the Royal Asiatic Society (2023). DOI: https://doi.org/10.1017/S1356186323000068
