= Epistulae (disambiguation) =

Epistulae or Epistles are a specific genre of letter-writing composed in Latin. The term may also refer to specific works:

- Epistulae (Pliny) (Letters), a collection of letters from Pliny the Younger
- Epistles (Horace) (Letters), two books by Horace
- Epistles (Plato), a collection of thirteen letters by Plato
- The Epistles (Manichaeism), a Manichaean scriptural text
- The Pauline epistles and the Catholic epistles of the Bible
- Epistulae ex Ponto (Letters from the Black Sea), a work of Ovid
- Epistulae Heroidum (Letters of Heroines), a collection of fifteen epistolary poems composed by Ovid
- Epistulae Morales ad Lucilium (Moral Letters to Lucilius), a bundle of 124 letters by Seneca the Younger
- Epistolæ Obscurorum Virorum (Letters of Obscure Men), a collection of satirical Latin letters which appeared in the 16th century in Germany

== See also ==
- Epistolary (disambiguation)
