= Doctrina Christiana =

Late 16th century catechism book

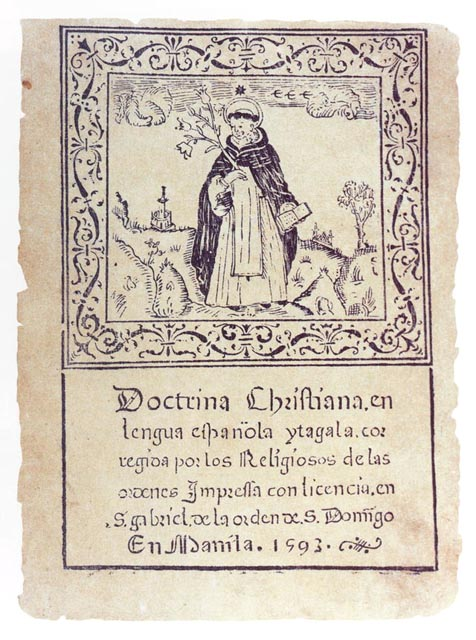
- Cover of the Doctrina Christiana en lengua española y tagala featuring Saint Dominic with the book's full title. Woodcut, 1593.
- Author: Fr. Juan de Plasencia
- Language: Early Modern Spanish and Classical Tagalog
- Subject: Catholic catechism
- Genre: Religion
- Published: 1593
- Publication date: Late 16th century
- Publication place: Manila, Captaincy General of the Philippines, Viceroyalty of New Spain, Spanish Empire

Doctrina Christiana
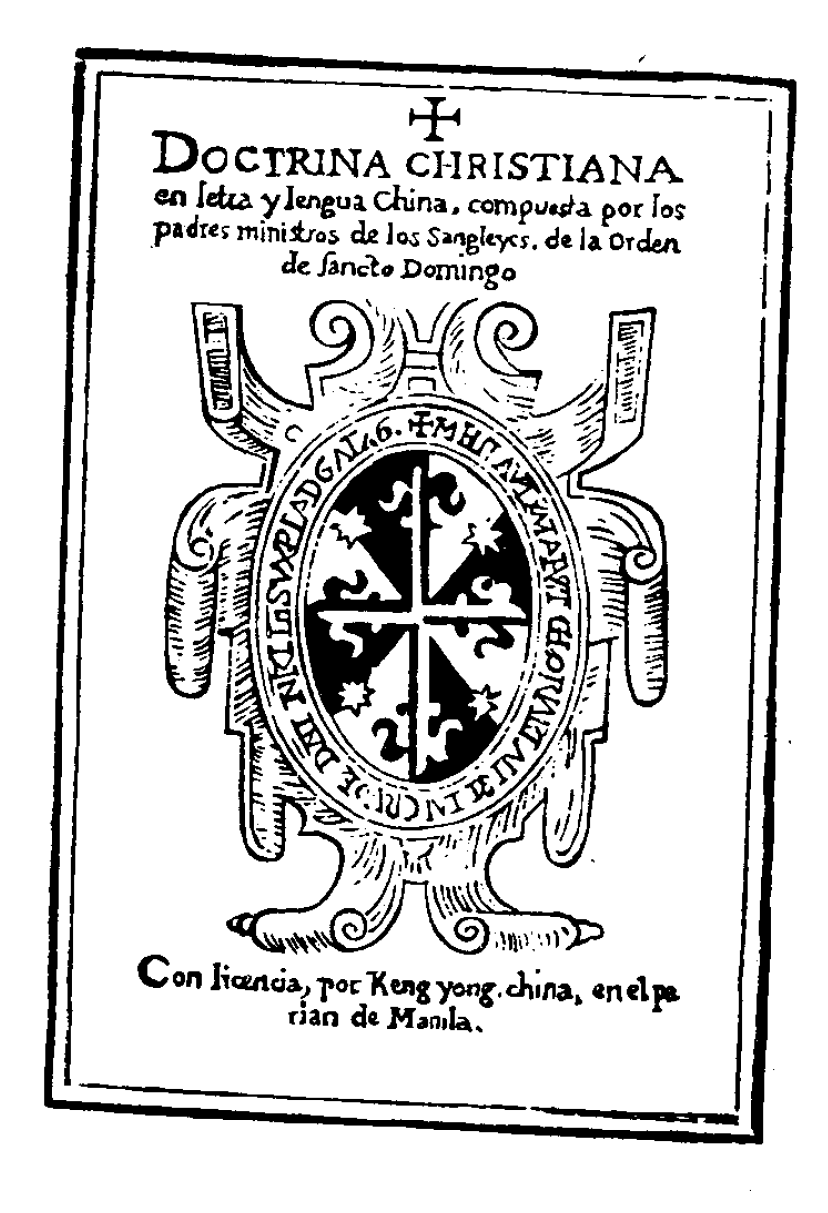
- Cover of the Doctrina Christiana en letra y lengua china featuring the seal of the Dominican Order with the book's full title. Woodcut, 1593/1605.
- Author: Fr. Juan Cobo, O.P.; Fr. Miguel de Benavides now Archbishop Miguel de Benevides of Manila O.P.
- Language: Early Manila Hokkien and Early Modern Spanish
- Subject: Catholic catechism
- Genre: Religion
- Published: 1593 [?] / 1605 [?]
- Publication date: Late 16th century
- Publication place: Manila, Captaincy General of the Philippines, Viceroyalty of New Spain, Spanish Empire

The Doctrina Christiana (Christian Doctrine) were two early books on the catechism of the Catholic Church, both published 1593 in Manila, Philippines. These are two of the earliest printed books in the Philippines.

- The Doctrina Christiana en letra y lengua China (1593-1605), by Fray Juan Cobo and Fray Miguel de Benavides, printed by the Sangley Chinese printer Keng Yong.
- The Doctrina Christiana en lengua española y tagala (1593), by Fray Juan de Plasencia.

The latter, Doctrina Christiana en Lengua Española y Tagala (Christian Doctrine in Spanish and Tagalog), Manila, 1593, was also the first book written in a Philippine language, as well as the first recorded alphabet of a Philippine language (the Tagalog Abecedario). The book was inscribed in the UNESCO Memory of the World Register – Asia and the Pacific in 2024.

== Title ==
The Doctrina Christiana en lengua española y tagala written in Early Modern Spanish and Classical Tagalog with the Latin and Baybayin script.

Original Spanish title:

Doctrina Chriſtiana, en lengua eſpanöla y tagala, corregida por los Religiosos de las ordenes Impreſſa con licencia, en S. Gabriel de la Orden de S. Domĩgo. En Manila, 1593. [sic]

In English:

Christian Doctrine, in Spanish and Tagalog language, corrected by the Religious of the Orders. Printed with licence in Saint Gabriel of the Order of Saint Dominic. In Manila, 1593.

In Tagalog (Filipino):

Doktrina Kristiyana, sa wikang Kastila at Tagalog, itinama ng mga Relihiyoso ng mga Orden. Inilimbag na may Lisensya sa San Gabriel ng Orden ni Santo Domingo. Sa Maynila, 1593.

The Doctrina Christiana en letra y lengua china written in Early Manila Hokkien Chinese in Chinese characters (Chinese: 漢文; Pe̍h-ōe-jī: Hàn-bûn) with some Early Modern Spanish in Latin script.

Original Spanish title:

Doctrina Christiana en letra y lengua China, compuesta por los padres ministros de los Sangleyes, de la Orden de Sancto Domingo. Con licencia, por Keng yong, china, en el Parián de Manila

In English:

Christian Doctrine in Chinese letter and language, composed by the priest ministers of the Sangleys, of the Order of Saint Dominic. With license by Keng yong, Chinese, at the Parián in Manila

== History ==
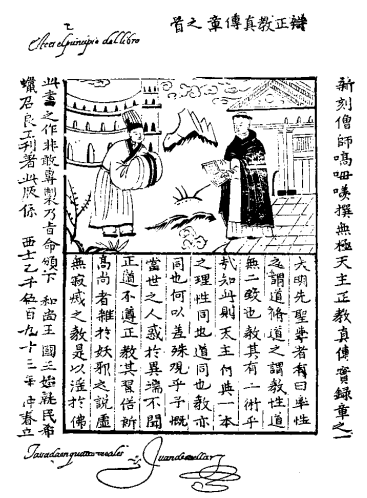
First page of Rectificación y Mejora de Principios Naturales (天主教真傳實錄), by Fr. Juan Cobo, Woodcut, (1593, Manila), with resemblance to the style of the Tagalog Doctrina published in the same year, but featuring a Dominican priest explaining the contents of a book to a Chinese scholar.

There is some controversy about which of the versions is the first printed book in Spanish Philippines, with some scholars believing the first to be the Chinese-language version titled Doctrina Christiana en letra y lengua China, compuesta por los padres ministros de los Sangleyes, de la Orden de Sancto Domingo. Con licencia, por Keng yong, china, en el parian de Manila. The controversy about the dates of publication has generated a temporal window ranging between 1590 and 1593, depending on the scholar. The Chinese printer Keng Yong has been the object of much attention, but there is not much conclusive information about him. Concerning the authorship, there is agreement that Juan Cobo and Miguel de Benavides y Añoza, along with their Sangley Chinese collaborators, created this catechism.

One of the earliest references to both versions comes from Gómez Pérez Dasmariñas, the seventh Spanish governor-general of the Philippines, who wrote a letter to Philip II of Spain on June 20, 1593, that read:

“Sire, in the name of Your Majesty, I have for this once, because of the existing great need, granted a license for the printing of the Doctrinas Christianas, herewith enclosed—one in the Tagalog language, which is the native and best of these islands, and the other in Chinese—from which I hope great benefits will result in the conversion and instruction of the peoples of both nations; and because the lands of the Indies are on a larger scale in everything and things more expensive, I have set the price of them at four reales a piece, until Your Majesty is pleased to decree in full what is to be done.”

Missionary fathers placed the Doctrina among the books necessary to have in print in foreign lands. As such, the Filipino book is similar to one printed in Mexico in 1539 in Spanish and local Mexican vernacular, followed by Saint Francis Xavier’s Doutrina Christão in Malay printed by the Jesuit press at Goa in 1557. Another Doctrina was printed in Spanish and the native languages at Lima in 1584.

According to Piet Van der Loon (1966) though, the above letter is more likely referring to the Tagalog Doctrina and the Rectificación y Mejora de Principios Naturales 天主教真傳實錄 also by Fr. Juan Cobo, published on 1593 in Manila, while the Hokkien Chinese Doctrina was left undated, but believed to have been published from a temporal window ranging between 1593 to 1605 before the death of Fr. Miguel de Benavides, who is ascribed as one of its authors.

=== Extant print copies ===
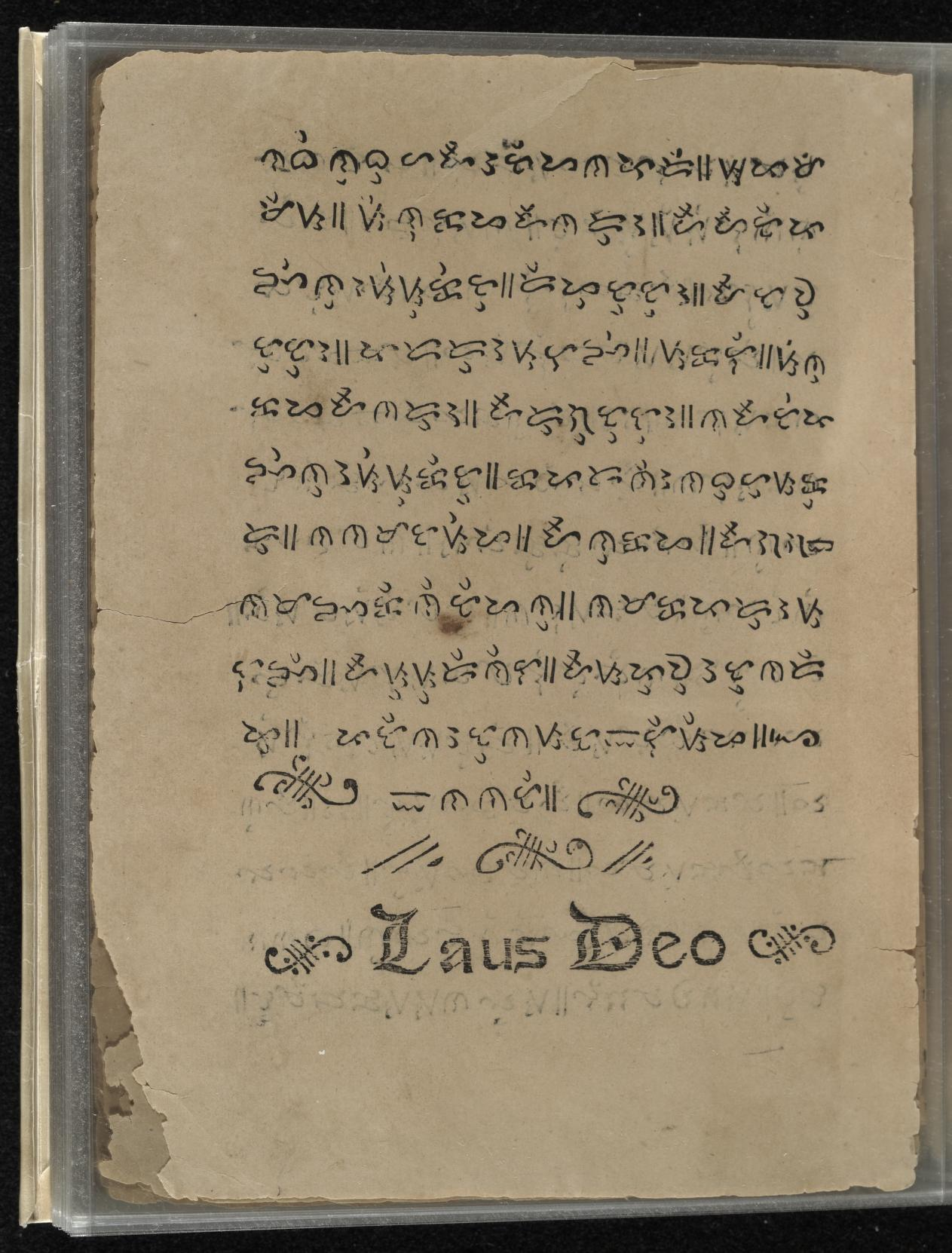
Page from the Doctrina Christiana en lengua española y tagala, 1593. From the Rosenwald Collection, Library of Congress.

As for the Tagalog Doctrina, apart from the copy in the Library of Congress in Washington, DC, there are no other known copies in existence today. The quality of the paper, age, natural agents and disasters such as earthquakes and fires all contributed to the disappearance of most printed copies. The only known existing copies of early Philippine books are those sent to Europe during the 16th, 17th, and 18th centuries, which may lie uncatalogued in some library.

Such was the case for the copy sent to Philip II of Spain by the Governor-General Dasmariñas in 1593. This is believed to be the same copy that reappeared in 1946 in the possession of a Parisian bookseller and collector who specialised in Pacific imprints. William H. Schab, a New York City dealer, purchased the book and took it to the United States, where he resold it to Lessing J. Rosenwald, who in turn presented it to the Library of Congress where it remains today.

The only known surviving copy of the Chinese version is stored at Biblioteca Vaticana, as Jesús Gayo Aragón indicated in this 1951 edition of the text. Sometimes, however, this Doctrina in Chinese has been confused with the Rectificación y Mejora de Principios Naturales (天主教真傳實錄), by Juan Cobo, published posthumously in 1593, Manila. The only extant copy of this last book is in the Biblioteca Nacional in Madrid. It was republished in a trilingual edition by Fidel Villarroel in 1986.

== Contents ==
The title literally means "The Teachings of Christianity", and thus the primary goal of the book was to propagate Christian teaching across the Philippine archipelago. The book consists of 38 leaves and 74 pages of text in Spanish, Tagalog transliterated into roman letters, and Tagalog in its original Tagalog baybayin (sulat Tagalog) script, under a woodcut of Saint Dominic, with the verso originally blank, although in contemporary versions bears the manuscript inscription, "Tassada en dos reales", signed Juan de Cuellar.

After a syllabary comes the basic prayers: the Lord's Prayer, Hail Mary, Credo, and the Salve Regina. Following these are Articles of Faith, the Ten Commandments, Commandments of the Holy Church, Sacraments of the Holy Church, Seven Mortal Sins, Fourteen Works of Charity, the Confiteor and a brief Catechism.

== Characteristics ==
The book was printed on paper made from mulberry. The size of the volume, which is unbound, is 9 1/8 by 7 inches (230 by 180 mm), although individual leaves vary somewhat due to chipping. Some of the leaves have become separated from their complements, but enough remain in the original stitching to indicate that the book was originally made up in four gatherings, the first of twelve leaves, the second of ten, the third of ten, and the fourth of six. Although the book is of the size called quarto, the method of printing must have been page by page, so it is doubtful that each sheet was folded twice in the usual quarto manner, but more probable that it was printed four pages to a sheet of paper approximately 9 1/8 by 14 inches (230 by 360 mm), which was folded once.

The volume was printed using the xylographic technique, printing each page of text from one hand carved woodblock. Vertical lines long the inner margins of some pages were made by the inked edge of the block, and the grain of the wood appears as striations throughout the printed areas.

== See also ==
- Catechism for Filipino Catholics, the 20th-century successor to the Doctrina Christiana
- Christianity in the Philippines
- Catholic Church in the Philippines
- List of Memory of the World Documentary Heritage in the Philippines
