= Catechism for Filipino Catholics =

The Catechism for Filipino Catholics, or CFC, is a contextualized and inculturated Roman Catholic catechism for Filipinos prepared by the Catholic Bishops' Conference of the Philippines (CBCP) and approved by the Holy See. The draft was produced by the CBCP's "Episcopal Commission on Catechesis and Catholic Education."

It is considered the present-day successor of the early 16th century Doctrina Christiana, the first books printed in what is now the Philippines. It was written in Tagalog, in both abecedario (the newly developed Latinised orthography) and baybayin still commonly used at the time, as well as Spanish.
