= Wonju Won clan =

Korean clan from Gangwon Province

- Country: Korea
- Current region: Wonju, Gangwon Province
- Founder: Wŏn Kyŏng
- Connected members: Royal Noble Consort Seong-bi; Won Jin-ah; Wŏn Ch'ŏnsŏk; Won Hee-ryong; Won Yoo-chul; Won Sei-hoon; Wŏn Kyun
- Website: http://www.ungok.com/

The Wonju Won clan (Korean: 원주 원씨; Hanja: 原州 元氏) is a Korean clan. Their Bon-gwan is in Wonju, Gangwon Province. The clan was a prominent yangban family during Korea's Joseon dynasty.

According to the research held in 2015, the number of the Wonju Won clan was 126,677. Their founder was Wŏn Kŭkyu (원극유; 元克猷), a key figure during Taejo of Goryeo’s reign, and Wŏn Ikkyŏm (원익겸; 元益謙) who made Wŏn Kyŏng (Korean: 원경) the progenitor of the clan. Wŏn Kyŏng was dispatched by Emperor Taizong of Tang in Tang dynasty as one of the Hanlin Academy.

All three men have separate lines that were called Wongokgonggye (원곡공계, 耘谷公系) through Wŏn Kyŏng, Wonseongbaekgye (원성백계, 原城伯系) through Wŏn Kŭkyu, and Sijunggonggye (시중공계, 侍中公系) through Wŏn Ikkyŏm. But these lines were eventually, formally, divided into branches; Wongok Baekpa (원성백파, 原城伯派), Wonseong Baekpa (원성백파, 原城伯派), and Sijung Gongpa (시중공파, 侍中公派).

Royal Noble Consort Seong-bi, a concubine of King Taejo of Joseon was a member of the clan. As well as the mother of Queen Jeongsun, who is the second wife of King Yeongjo of Joseon; and the mother of Royal Noble Consort Su, the concubine of King Jeongjo of Joseon, are descendants of the clan through Wŏn Tup'yo (원두표, 元斗杓; 1593 - 1664) who was from the Sijung Gongpa branch.

Became of the number of members it has, the clan has various locations such as Hwaseong County, Gangwon Province; Yeoju, Gyeonggi Province; Pyeongtaek, Gyeonggi Province; Gwiseong County, North Pyeongan Province (North Korea); Seongcheon County, South Pyeongan Province (North Korea); and Jinan County, North Jeolla Province.

== See also ==
- Korean clan names of foreign origin
