= Mingxin baojian =

14th-century Chinese book

The Mingxin baojian (simplified Chinese: 明心宝鉴; traditional Chinese: 明心寶鑑; pinyin: Míngxīn bǎojiàn; Wade–Giles: Ming-hsin pao-chien; lit. 'bright heart-mind precious mirror') is an ancient Chinese book containing "a collection of aphorisms and quotations form the Chinese classics and other works" The author and date of authorship are not reliably known, although later references suggest that it was compiled in 1393 by Fan Liben (Chinese: 范立本). The quotations and aphorisms in the book appear to be from scholarly writings of Confucianism, Buddhism, and Taoism, with "a great many of the quotations... taken from Taoist writings", suggesting to a few researchers like Wang Chonmin that the author was a follower of Taoism, while most of the text comes from the Confucian School.

The Mingxin baojian was the first book translated from Chinese into a Western language. "The Ming-hsin pao-chien seems to have widely circulated among the people in Fukien in the late Ming period. It was brought by the Chinese to the Philippines". Circa 1590, it was translated into Spanish by a Dominican friar named Juan Cobo who arrived in the Philippines in 1588. In 1595, the Dominicans presented this translation, along with a copy of the original, to Philip III of Spain, then Crown Prince. Juan Cobo´s manuscript is bilingual, and contains comment in the margins, and a introductory letter by Miguel de Benavides y Añoza. Prior to its acquisition by westerners, the work had already been translated and circulated in other Asian countries. It is known as the Myeongsim Bogam in Korean, and the Minh tâm bửu giám or Minh tâm bảo giám in Vietnamese. It was included in The Chinese Repository, translated by William Milne.

== See also ==
- Naehun
