= Princess Sukseon =

Korean princess (1793–1836)

Princess Sukseon 숙선옹주
- Princess of Joseon
- Born: 11 April 1793; Hanseong, Joseon
- Died: 7 June 1836 (aged 43); Joseon
- Spouse: Hong Hyeon-ju (m.1804–1836)
- Issue: Hong Woo-cheol
- Clan: Jeonju Yi clan (by birth); Pungsan Hong clan (by marriage)
- Dynasty: House of Yi
- Father: Jeongjo of Joseon
- Mother: Royal Noble Consort Su of the Bannam Park clan
- Religion: Korean Buddhism

- Princess Sukseon
- Hangul: 숙선옹주
- Hanja: 淑善翁主
- RR: Sukseon ongju
- MR: Suksŏn ongju

Princess Sukseon (Korean: 숙선옹주; Hanja: 淑善翁主; 11 April 1793 – 7 June 1836) was the daughter of King Jeongjo of Joseon and Royal Noble Consort Su of the Bannam Park clan, and the only surviving sibling of Sunjo of Joseon.

== Biography ==
=== Early life ===
Princess Sukseon was born on 11 April 1793 as the second child and only daughter of Royal Noble Consort Su and King Jeongjo. Her personal name is unknown.

Her father later died on 18 August 1800, during his 24th year of reign. Thus having her older brother, Yi Gong, ascend the throne on 23 August 1800.

=== Marriage and later life ===
On 27 May 1804, at age 11, Princess Sukseon married Hong Hyeon-ju, the youngest son of Hong In-mo and Lady Seo of the Dalseong Seo clan. Her husband was honoured as Prince Consort Yeongmyeong (영명위). The marriage ceremony was held in Changdeokgung's Huijeongdang Hall.

The Princess had a good relationship with her brother, Sunjo. As a result, he continued to visit her after her marriage, despite the disapproval of the court officials.

In 1813, she gave birth to her only child, a son named Hong Woo-cheol.

Based on Hong Seon-pyo's book, Joseon Culinary Studies (조선요리학, 朝鮮料理學; lit. 'Korean Gastronomy'), the Princess made a new dish from diced radish. When it was tasted by the Royal Family, they all liked it and the King highly praised her. The dish was later named Kkakdugi (깍두기), because cutting food into cubes is called kkakduk sseolgi (깍둑썰기) in Korean.

Princess Sukseon died on June 7, 1836.

== Family ==
- Father: Yi San, King Jeongjo of Joseon (이산 조선 정조; 28 October 1752 – 18 August 1800)
- Mother: Royal Noble Consort Su of the Bannam Park clan (수빈 박씨; 1 June 1770 – 6 February 1823)

Sibling(s)

- Older brother: King Sunjo of Joseon (조선 순조; 29 July 1790 – 13 December 1834)

Husband

- Hong Hyeon-ju (홍현주; 洪顯周; 1793–1865)

Issue

- Son: Hong Woo-cheol (홍우철; 洪祐喆; 1813–1865)
