= Hamjong Eo clan =

Korean clan from South Pyongan Province

- Country: Korea
- Current region: Chungsan County
- Founder: Eo Hwa in
- Connected members: Ryu Soo-young; Euh Yoon-dae; Eo Jae-yeon; Queen Seonui
- Website: http://www.hamjong.or.kr/

Hamjong Eo clan (Korean: 함종 어씨; Hanja: 咸從 魚氏) is a Korean clan. Their Bon-gwan is in Chungsan County, South Pyongan Province. As of 2015, the clan had a membership of 15746. Their founder was Eo Hwa in, who was from Zuopingyi (左馮翊), China. He was exiled to Gangwon Province to avoid conflict in the Song dynasty. After that, he settled in Ham Jong Gun, Pyongan Province, and founded Hamjong Eo clan.

== See also ==
- Korean clan names of foreign origin
