= Haboush's theorem =

Each semi-simple algebraic group is geometrically reductive

In mathematics Haboush's theorem, often still referred to as the Mumford conjecture, states that for any semisimple algebraic group G over a field K, and for any linear representation ρ of G on a K-vector space V, given v ≠ 0 in V that is fixed by the action of G, there is a G-invariant polynomial F on V, without constant term, such that

F(v) ≠ 0.

The polynomial can be taken to be homogeneous, in other words an element of a symmetric power of the dual of V, and if the characteristic is p > 0 the degree of the polynomial can be taken to be a power of p. When K has characteristic 0 this was well known; in fact Weyl's theorem on the complete reducibility of the representations of G implies that F can even be taken to be linear. Mumford's conjecture about the extension to prime characteristic p was proved by William Haboush, about a decade after the problem had been posed by David Mumford, in the introduction to the first edition of his book Geometric Invariant Theory.

== Applications ==
Haboush's theorem can be used to generalize results of geometric invariant theory from characteristic 0, where they were already known, to characteristic p > 0. In particular Nagata's earlier results together with Haboush's theorem show that if a reductive group (over an algebraically closed field) acts on a finitely generated algebra then the fixed subalgebra is also finitely generated.

Haboush's theorem implies that if G is a reductive algebraic group acting regularly on an affine algebraic variety, then disjoint closed invariant sets X and Y can be separated by an invariant function f (this means that f is 0 on X and 1 on Y).

C. S. Seshadri extended Haboush's theorem to reductive groups over schemes.

It follows from the work of Nagata, Haboush, and Popov that the following conditions are equivalent for an affine algebraic group G over a field K:

- G is reductive (its unipotent radical is trivial).
- For any non-zero invariant vector in a rational representation of G, there is an invariant homogeneous polynomial that does not vanish on it.
- For any finitely generated K algebra on which G act rationally, the algebra of fixed elements is finitely generated.

== Proof ==
The theorem is proved in several steps as follows:

- We can assume that the group is defined over an algebraically closed field K of characteristic p > 0.
- Finite groups are easy to deal with as one can just take a product over all elements, so one can reduce to the case of connected reductive groups (as the connected component has finite index). By taking a central extension which is harmless one can also assume the group G is simply connected.
- Let A(G) be the coordinate ring of G. This is a representation of G with G acting by left translations. Pick an element v′ of the dual of V that has value 1 on the invariant vector v. The map V to A(G) by sending w ∈ V to the element a ∈ A(G) with a(g) = v′(g(w)). This sends v to 1 ∈ A(G), so we can assume that V ⊂ A(G) and v = 1.
- The structure of the representation A(G) is given as follows. Pick a maximal torus T of G, and let it act on A(G) by right translations (so that it commutes with the action of G). Then A(G) splits as a sum over characters λ of T of the subrepresentations A(G)^{λ} of elements transforming according to λ. So we can assume that V is contained in the T-invariant subspace A(G)^{λ} of A(G).
- The representation A(G)^{λ} is an increasing union of subrepresentations of the form E_{λ+nρ}⊗E_{nρ}, where ρ is the Weyl vector for a choice of simple roots of T, n is a positive integer, and E_{μ} is the space of sections of the line bundle over G/B corresponding to a character μ of T, where B is a Borel subgroup containing T.
- If n is sufficiently large then E_{nρ} has dimension (n+1)^{N} where N is the number of positive roots. This is because in characteristic 0 the corresponding module has this dimension by the Weyl character formula, and for n large enough that the line bundle over G/B is very ample, E_{nρ} has the same dimension as in characteristic 0.
- If q = p^{r} for a positive integer r, and n = q − 1, then E_{nρ} contains the Steinberg representation of G(F_{q}) of dimension q^{N}. (Here F_{q} ⊂ K is the finite field of order q.) The Steinberg representation is an irreducible representation of G(F_{q}) and therefore of G(K), and for r large enough it has the same dimension as E_{nρ}, so there are infinitely many values of n such that E_{nρ} is irreducible.
- If E_{nρ} is irreducible it is isomorphic to its dual, so E_{nρ}⊗E_{nρ} is isomorphic to End(E_{nρ}). Therefore, the T-invariant subspace A(G)^{λ} of A(G) is an increasing union of subrepresentations of the form End(E) for representations E (of the form E_{(q−1)ρ})). However, for representations of the form End(E) an invariant polynomial that separates 0 and 1 is given by the determinant. This completes the sketch of the proof of Haboush's theorem.

== Sources ==
- Haboush, W. J. (1975). "Reductive groups are geometrically reductive". Annals of Mathematics. 102 (1): 67–83. doi:10.2307/1970974. MR 0382294. Zbl 0316.14016.
- Nagata, Masayoshi (1963). "Invariants of a group in an affine ring". Journal of Mathematics of Kyoto University. 3 (3): 369–377. doi:10.1215/kjm/1250524787. MR 0179268.
- Seshadri, C. S. (1977). "Geometric reductivity over arbitrary base". Advances in Mathematics. 26 (3): 225–274. doi:10.1016/0001-8708(77)90041-x.
