= Yu Kamdong =

15th-century Korean kisaeng

- Hangul: 유감동
- Hanja: 兪甘同
- RR: Yu Gamdong
- MR: Yu Kamdong

Yu Kamdong (Korean: 유감동; Hanja: 兪甘同; 1430 – ? or after 1428), was a Korean kisaeng, dancer, writer, artist, and poet of the Joseon period, during the 15th century. Her kisaeng name was Kamdong.

== Biography ==
She was from noble families of the Korean Joseon Dynasty; her father was Yu Gwi-su, Mayor of Hanseong.

In her early years she was arranged to marry Ch'oe Chunggi, a county governor and head of a myeon.

She was raped by Kim Yŏdal (김여달; 金如達) and divorced, becoming a kisaeng. As a kisaeng she was active as a dancer and poet. She wrote poetry and painted pictures, but most of her work has been destroyed or not been preserved.

As a divorced woman, she became known for her love life, having numerous male lovers, something extremely controversial in Korean society at that time. Reportedly, she had 39 lovers, among them Public Works Minister Sŏng Talsaeng, secretary of the Office of Inspector-General Yi Hyorye, a craftsman as well as her husband's nephew and brother-in-law. This was technically adultery, as she was living estranged from her husband but not formally divorced from him. In 1428, in accordance with the law, she was therefore punished for adultery by being flogged and made a slave for a government office in a remote region.

There was at this time an increasing severity in the persecution of women who committed adultery, and particularly noblewomen such as Yu Kamdong, Kŭmŭmdong and Tongja, both noblewomen who committed adultery with male relatives and where punished, and above all the noblewoman Ŏudong, who was executed in 1480 after a famous scandal in which she had committed adultery with multiple men including royal relatives, court officials and slaves, and these cases eventually resulted in the death penalty formally introduced for female adultery by King Jungjong in 1513.

== Family ==
- Father - Yu Kwisu (유귀수; 兪龜壽; 1410 – ?)
- Mother - name unknown; (1416 – ?)
- Husband - Ch'oe Chunggi (최중기; 崔仲基)

== See also ==
- Heo Nanseolheon
- Shin Saimdang
- Hwang Jin-Yi
