= Epistolary =

Epistolary means "relating to an epistle or letter". It may refer to:

- Epistolary (Latin: epistolarium), a Christian liturgical book containing set readings for church services from the New Testament Epistles
- Epistolary novel, a novel written as a series of letters
- Epistolary poem, a poem in the form of an epistle or letter

== See also ==
- Epistulae (disambiguation)
