= Subin Park =

Joseon royal consort (1770–1823)

- Royal Consort of the Senior First Rank
- Born: 1 June 1770; Yeoju County, Gyeonggi Province, Joseon
- Died: 6 February 1823 (aged 52); Bogyeongdang Hall, Changdeokgung, Hanseong, Joseon
- Burial: Hwigyeongwon, Namyangju, South Korea
- Consort of: Jeongjo of Joseon
- Issue Detail: Sunjo of Joseon; Princess Sukseon
Names
- Ranks: Bin (빈; 嬪; from 1787) → Bi (비; 妃; from 1901) (Note: Literal translation: "concubine" → "consort".); Title: Lady Gasun (가순궁; 嘉順宮; Gasungung; lit. ''Gasun Palace'')
Posthumous name
- Hyeonmok (현목; 顯穆)
- Clan: Bannam Park (by birth); Jeonju Yi (by marriage)
- Dynasty: Yi
- Father: Park Jun-won
- Mother: Lady, of the Wonju Won clan

Korean name
- Hangul: 수빈 박씨
- Hanja: 綏嬪 朴氏
- RR: Subin Bakssi
- MR: Subin Pakssi

Subin Park (Korean: 수빈 박씨; Hanja: 綏嬪 朴氏; 1 June 1770 – 6 February 1823), or Concubine Su, (Note: The literal translation of bin (빈; 嬪) is "concubine". Combined with the honorific title su (수; 綏), (Note: Also pronounced as yu (유) during the 19th century, so Lady Park is also known as "Yubin/Concubine Yu".) the full meaning is "Pacifist Concubine".) of the Bannam Park clan, also known as Lady Gasun, was a consort of Jeongjo of Joseon and the biological mother of King Sunjo. She is the only royal consort in Joseon's more than 500 years of history to live long enough to see her son ascend to the throne.

== Biography ==
=== Early life ===
Lady Park was born into the Bannam Park clan, as the fourth child and second daughter of Minister of Justice Park Jun-won, and a lady from the Wonju Won clan.

=== Royal consort ===
In 1787, because King Jeongjo was once again childless, Queen Dowager Yesun decided to choose a new concubine for her legal grandson, and Lady Park was selected on 26 March, when she was 16 years old.

Three days later, on 29 March, Lady Park was appointed as a royal consort of the senior first rank (빈; 嬪; bin), with the honorific title su (수; 綏), meaning "to pacify". The following day, she entered the palace.

On 29 July 1790, Lady Park gave birth to a son, Yi Gong, who was appointed as crown prince in 1800, at the age of 10. On 11 April 1793, she gave birth to Princess Sukseon.

Lady Park was described as gentle, well-behaved and courteous. She was also usually taciturn and lived simply. As a result, she was greatly admired as a benevolent consort.

=== Death and burial ===
In 1823, during her son's reign, Lady Park died in Bogyeongdang Hall, Changdeokgung.

Her tomb was called Hwigyeongwon, and was initially situated in Yangju (present-day Dongdaemun District, Seoul), but was moved to its current location in Namyangju, Gyeonggi Province, during Cheoljong's reign. Hwigyeong-dong, a neighborhood of Dongdaemun, takes its name from the former site of her tomb.

Lady Park's spirit tablet was enshrined in Chilgung (칠궁; 七宮), the place which houses the spirit tablets of seven royal consorts who gave birth to kings.

Lady Park was given the posthumous name Hyeonmok (현목; 顯穆; lit. ''evident majesty''). In 1901, following the establishment of the Korean Empire, she was elevated to the rank of consort (비; 妃; bi).

== Family ==
- Father: Park Jun-won (박준원; 1739–1807)
- Mother: Lady, of the Wonju Won clan (원주 원씨; 1740–1783)
- Sibling(s)
  - Elder brother: Park Jong-bo (박종보; 朴宗輔; 1760–1807)
  - Elder brother: Park Jong-gyeong (박종경; 朴宗慶; 1765–1817)
  - Elder sister: Lady, of the Bannam Park clan (정부인 반남 박씨; 貞夫人 潘南 朴氏)
  - Younger brother: Park Jong-ik (박종익; 朴宗翊; 1773–1791)
  - Younger brother: Park Jong-hui (박종희; 朴宗喜; 1775–1849)
  - Younger sister: Lady, of the Bannam Park clan (반남 박씨)
  - Younger sister: Lady, of the Bannam Park clan (반남 박씨)
  - Younger sister: Lady, of the Bannam Park clan (반남 박씨)
  - Younger half-brother: Park Jong-yeom (박종염; 朴宗琰; 1797–1857)
  - Younger half-brother: Park Jong-yeong (박종영; 朴宗永; 1804–?)
- Husband: Yi San, King Jeongjo of Joseon (조선 정조 이산; 28 October 1752 – 18 August 1800)
- Issue
  - Yi Gong, King Sunjo of Joseon (조선 순조 이공; 29 July 1790 – 13 December 1834), Jeongjo's second son
  - Princess Sukseon (숙선옹주; 1 March 1793 – 7 June 1836), Jeongjo's second daughter
