= Kang Jeongildang =

Korean poet (1772–1832)

Kang Jeongildang (Korean: 강정일당; Hanja: 姜靜一堂; 1772–1832) (also Gang Jeongildang), was a Korean poet and scholar.

Kang Jeongildang, also known as Kang Ji-deok (강지덕; 姜至德), was born into the Jinju Kang clan (진주 강씨; 晉州 姜氏) in Jecheon, Chungcheong Province.

In 1791, at the age of 19, she married the scholar Yun Gwang-yeon (尹光演, 윤광연; 1778–1838). The couple had five sons and four daughters, but all died prematurely. Because of their poverty, her spouse could not afford to work for their support and study at the same time, so she supported them both by knitting while he studied. Often she would sit beside him and learn the same things he was studying. She also composed many poems of her own, as well as many letters to her husband which still survive, and are admired for their quality of writing and philosophy. She soon learned the writing methods of Hwang Un-jo (황운조) and many others, and was able to write a good book, while also showing excellent abilities in poetry and scriptures.

After her death, her widower, who respected her literary work, published her collected works in Jeongildang-yugo (정일당유고, 靜一堂遺稿; 1836), containing 150 writings, among them 38 poems and 82 letters.

She is buried in Geumto-dong (Siheung-dong), Sujeong-gu, Seongsam-si, Gyeonggi Province.
