= Seo Yeongsuhap =

Korean poet (1753–1823)

Seo Yeongsuhap (Korean: 서영수합; Hanja: 徐令壽閤; 1753–1823) was a Korean poet.

== Biography ==
Seo Yeongsuhap was born into a high-ranking family, the Dalseong Seo clan (달성 서씨; 達城 徐氏), as the daughter of the governor of Gangwon Province, Seo Hyeong-su, and Lady Kim of the Andong Kim clan. Through her mother, Lady Seo was a great-great-great-granddaughter of Princess Jeongmyeong and Hong Ju-won. Thus making her be fourth cousins to Lady Hyegyeong, and a fourth cousins once removed to her future husband. Through paternal grandfather, Yeongsuhap and the future Queen Sunwon, King Jeongjo’s daughter-in-law, were third cousins.

She was reportedly known for her abilities in mathematics. She published hundreds of poems in an anthology, and included an appendix to her husband's memoir. In the Korean society of her time, women were not supposed to have any official role, and she was one of very few women published during the Joseon dynasty. Alongside Yi Bingheogak, she is mentioned as one of two female scholars to make a name for themselves within practical learning.

She was later arranged to marry Hong In-mo of the Pungsan Hong clan, a royal official. They had three sons, Hong Seok-ju, Hong Gil-ju, and Hong Hyeon-ju, and two daughters, Hong Won-ju (alternatively known as Hong Yuhandang) and Lady Hong. All four became poets as well, and Gil-ju under the influence of his mother also became a notable mathematician. Her third son, Hong Hyeon-ju, married Princess Sukseon, the only daughter of King Jeongjo of Joseon, who herself is known for inventing Kkakdugi, i.e. the diced radish kimchi.
