= Joan R. Piggott =

American historian (born 1947)

- Born: 1947 (age 78–79)
- Education: Stanford University (MA)
- Occupation: Historian

Joan R. Piggott (born 1947) is an American historian specializing in East Asian studies.

== Education ==
Piggott completed a Master of Arts from Stanford University in 1972, followed by a doctorate from Stanford in 1987.

== Career ==
Piggott began her academic career at the University of Miami, where she was an assistant professor of history from 1987 until 1989. Between 1989 and 1995, Piggott held an assistant professorship in history at Cornell University, where she was promoted to associate professor. In 2003, Piggott accepted an appointment as Gordon L. MacDonald Chair in History at the University of Southern California.

== Selected publications ==
- Goodwin, Janet R.; Piggott, Joan R., eds. (2018). Land, Power, and the Sacred: The Estate System in Medieval Japan. University of Hawaii Press. ISBN 9780824872939.
- Piggott, Joan R.; Yoshida, Sanae, eds. (2008). Teishinkōki: Year 939 in the Journal of Regent Fujiwara no Tadahira. Cornell University Press. ISBN 9781933947105.
- Piggott, Joan R., ed. (2006). Capital and Countryside in Japan, 300-1180: Japanese Historians Interpreted in English. Cornell University Press. ISBN 9781885445391.
- Ko, Dorothy; Haboush, JaHyun Kim; Piggott, Joan R., eds. (2003). Women and Confucian Cultures in Premodern China, Korea, and Japan. University of California Press. ISBN 9780520927827.
- Piggott, Joan R. (1997). The Emergence of Japanese Kingship. Stanford University Press. ISBN 9780804728324.
