= William Haboush =

American mathematician (born 1942)

William Joseph Haboush (born 1942) is an American mathematician, a professor of mathematics at the University of Illinois Urbana-Champaign. An algebraic geometer, Haboush is the namesake of Haboush's theorem, which he proved in 1975, resolving a conjecture of David Mumford.

Haboush completed a Ph.D. in 1969 at Columbia University. His dissertation, A Theory of Codimension One Phenomena with an Application to the Theory of Purely Inseparable Descent, was jointly supervised by Heisuke Hironaka and Raymond Hoobler.
