= Dorothy Y. Ko =

American historian

- 高彦頤
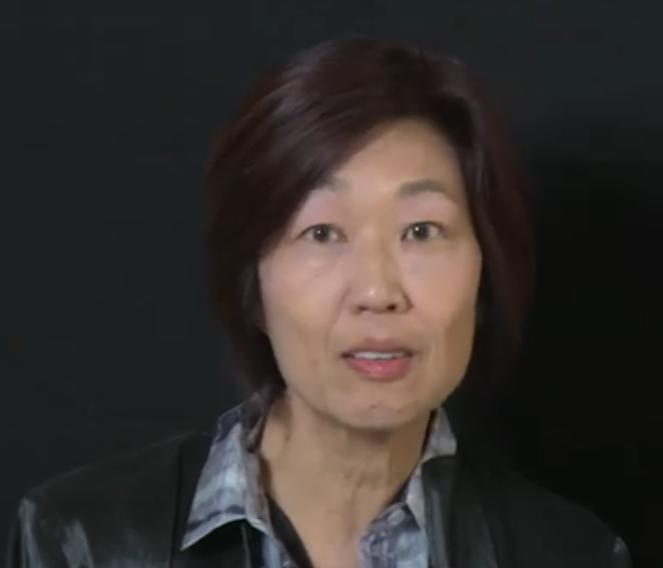
- Born: 1957 (age 68–69); Hong Kong
- Education: Stanford University (BA, MA, PhD)
- Notable work: Teachers of the Inner Chambers: Women and Culture in Seventeenth-Century China (1994); Every Step a Lotus: Shoes for Bound Feet (2001); Cinderella's Sisters: A Revisionist History of Footbinding (2005); The Social Life of Inkstones: Artisans and Scholars in Early Qing China (2017)

Dorothy Ko (Chinese: 高彦頤; pinyin: Gāo Yànyí; born 1957) is a Chinese historian. She is a professor of history and women's studies at Barnard College of Columbia University. She is a historian of early modern China, known for her multi-disciplinary and multi-dimensional research. As a historian of early modern China, she has endeavored to engage with the field of modern China studies; as a China scholar, she has always positioned herself within the study of women and gender and applied feminist approaches in her work; as a historian, she has ventured across disciplinary boundaries, into fields that include literature, visual and material culture, science and technology, as well as studies of fashion, the body and sexuality.

Prior to joining the faculty of Barnard and Columbia, Ko has taught at the University of California, San Diego and at Rutgers University. Ko's research has been supported by the John Simon Guggenheim Memorial Foundation and the Institute for Advanced Study, Princeton, among others. She was named a fellow of the American Academy of Arts and Sciences in 2022.

== Education ==
Ko received her secondary education at Queen Elizabeth School, Hong Kong. She then went to the United States to attend Stanford University, where she earned her Bachelor of Arts (B.A.) in international relations in 1978, her Master of Arts (M.A.) in history in 1979, and her Ph.D. in history in 1989.

== Career ==
Ko began her career as an assistant professor of history at Stony Brook University from 1989 to 1990. She then taught history at Temple University, Japan Campus in 1991 before teaching at the University of California, San Diego from 1991 to 1995. After being promoted to associate professor in 1996, she taught at Rutgers University–New Brunswick until 2001, when she was inducted into the Department of History at her current institution, Barnard College as a professor. She currently teaches undergraduate and graduate courses on the history of the body, gender and writing, and visual and material cultures in China, including Gender and Power in China, Feminisms in China, and Body Histories: The Case of Footbinding.

== Historiography ==
=== Influences ===
Ko's academic interests and conceptual organization of her scholarship bore significant influence from the works of two historians: Joan Scott and Caroline Walker Bynum. Ko utilized Scott's delineation of gender to establish a theoretical foundation in her explication of the gender experiences and identities of elite women in seventeenth-century China as subjective constructs and later, in her deconstruction of footbinding as a gendered practice. Caroline Walker Bynum's examination of the relationships between women's conceptualization of their bodies and its theological and spiritual position has inspired Ko to problematize the experiences of women in late imperial China with their bodies, especially in terms of footbinding.

== Works ==
=== Books ===
==== As author ====
- Teachers of the Inner Chambers: Women and Culture in Seventeenth-Century China (Stanford University Press, 1994)
- Every Step a Lotus: Shoes for Bound Feet (University of California Press, 2001)
- Cinderella’s Sisters: A Revisionist History of Footbinding (University of California Press, 2005). This book was awarded the 2006 Joan Kelley Memorial Prize from the American Historical Association for the Best Book on Women's History or Feminist Theory.
- The Social Life of Inkstones: Artisans and Scholars in Early Qing China (University of Washington Press, 2017). This book was nominated as a finalist for the 2018 Charles Rufus Morey Book Award by the College Art Association.

==== As editor ====
- Women and Confucian Cultures in Pre-modern China, Korea, and Japan (University of California Press, 2003), co-edited by Ko, JaHyun Kim Haboush, and Joan R. Piggott
- The Birth of Chinese Feminism: Essential Texts in Transnational Theory (Columbia University Press, 2013), co-edited by Ko, Lydia Liu and Rebecca Karl
- Making the Palace Machine Work: Mobilizing People, Objects, and Nature in the Qing Empire (Amsterdam University Press, 2021), co-edited by Ko, Martina Siebert, and Kaijun Chen

=== Articles ===
- "Pursuing Talent and Virtue: Education and Women’s Culture in Seventeenth- and Eighteenth-Century China." Late Imperial China 13, no. 1 (June 1992): 9–39. https://doi.org/10.1353/late.1992.0002.
- "Kongjian Yujia: Lunmingwei Qingchu Funǚde Shenghuo Kongjian." Jindai zhongguo funǚ shiyanjiu, no. 3 (August 1995): 21–50. https://doi.org/10.6352/mhwomen.199508.0021.
- "Bondage in Time: Footbinding and Fashion Theory." Fashion Theory 1, no. 1 (February 1997): 3–27. https://doi.org/10.2752/136270497779754552.
- "The Body as Attire: The Shifting Meanings of Footbinding in Seventeenth-Century China." Journal of Women’s History 8, no. 4 (December 1997): 8–27. https://doi.org/10.1353/jowh.2010.0171.
- "Footbinding in the Museum." Interventions: International Studies of Postcolonial Studies 5, no. 3 (July 2003): 426–39. https://doi.org/10.1080/1369801032000135657.
- "R. H. van Gulik, Mi Fu, and Connoisseurship of Chinese Art." Hanxue Yanjiu 30, no. 2 (June 2012): 265–96.
