= JaHyun Kim Haboush =

Korean-American historian (1941–2011)

- Born: Kim JaHyun; August 10, 1941; Keijō, Keiki-dō, Korea, Empire of Japan
- Died: January 30, 2011 (aged 69); New York City, United States
- Education: Ewha Womans University (BA); University of Michigan (MA); Columbia University (PhD)
- Occupations: Professor, King Sejong Professor of Korean Studies
- Spouse: William Haboush

JaHyun Kim Haboush (Korean: 김자현; Hanja: 金滋炫; 1940 – January 30, 2011) was a South Korean scholar of Korean history and literature. Haboush was the King Sejong Professor of Korean Studies at Columbia University when she died in New York City in 2011.

== Biography ==
Haboush attended Ewha Womans University and studied English literature in Seoul. She studied Chinese literature at the University of Michigan, where she graduated with an M.A. in Chinese Literature under the supervision of Professor James Crump in 1970. Haboush obtained her Ph.D. from the Department of East Asian Languages and Cultures at Columbia University in 1978 under Professor Gari Ledyard. She went on to teach at Queens College of the City University of New York, The University at Albany, and the University of Illinois before her return to Columbia as a professor in 2000.

== Work ==
Haboush has contributed extensively to the fields of Korean studies, Korean history and literature, and gender studies. Her important writings include the books The Confucian Kingship in Korea, the paperback edition of her 1988 monograph, A Heritage of Kings: One Man's Monarchy in the Confucian World on the reign of King Yeongjo of Joseon of the Joseon dynasty, The Memoirs of Lady Hyegyŏng: The Autobiographical Writings of a Crown Princess of Eighteenth-Century Korea, a translation of the Memoirs of Lady Hyegyŏng in which Lady Hyegyŏng details the events leading to the execution of Crown Prince Sado. Her scholarly work also includes several edited volumes related to the history and literature of early modern Korea, including Culture and the State in Late Chosŏn Korea, Women and Confucian Cultures in Pre-modern China, Korea, and Japan, and Epistolary Korea: Letters from the Communicative Space of the Chosŏn, 1392–1910.

In the summary by her editor (and husband) William Haboush in 2016, she interpreted the decisive impact on Korea of its victories against the Japanese and Manchu invaders:

Out of this great war at the end of the 16th century and the Manchu invasions of 1627 and 1636–1637, Koreans emerged with a discernible sense of themselves as a distinct ethnie united by birth, language, and belief forged by this immense clash of the three great powers of East Asia....Korea arrived at the brink of the seventeenth century as a nation.

== Select bibliography ==
=== Books ===
- The Rise of Neo-Confucianism in Korea (1985). Coeditor. New York: Columbia University Press.
- A Heritage of Kings: One Man's Monarchy in the Confucian World (1988). Columbia UP.
- The Memoirs of Lady Hyegyŏng: The Autobiographical Writings of a Crown Princess of Eighteenth Century Korea (1996). Berkeley: University of California Press.
- Culture and the State in Late Chosŏn Korea Coeditor. (1999). Harvard Asia Center
- The Confucian Kingship in Korea (2001). New York: Columbia University Press.
- Women and Confucian Cultures in Pre-modern China, Korea, and Japan. Coeditor. (2003) Berkeley: U of California Press.
- Epistolary Korea: Letters from the Communicative Space of the Chosŏn, 1392–1910. Editor. (2009) New York: Columbia University Press
- The Great East Asian War and the Birth of the Korean Nation. Columbia UP (2016). 2016. ISBN 9780231540988.

== See also ==
- Martina Deuchler
