= Flowers of the Prison =

2016 South Korean TV series

- Promotional Poster
- Also known as: The Flower in Prison
- Hangul: 옥중화
- RR: Okjunghwa
- MR: Okchunghwa
- Genre: Historical; Romance; Action; Drama
- Created by: Kim Ho-young
- Written by: Choi Wan-kyu
- Directed by: Lee Byung-hoon; Choi Jeong-kyu
- Starring: Jin Se-yeon; Go Soo; Kim Mi-sook; Jung Joon-ho; Park Joo-mi; Yoon Joo-hee; Kim Soo-yeon; Jun Kwang-ryul; Choi Tae-joon
- Music by: Kim Joon-seok; Jeong Se-rin
- Country of origin: South Korea
- Original language: Korean
- No. of episodes: 51

Production
- Executive producer: Kim Ho-young
- Producer: Son Gi-won
- Production location: South Korea
- Running time: 63-67 minutes
- Production company: Kim Jong-hak Production

Original release
- Network: MBC
- Release: April 30 – November 6, 2016

Flowers of the Prison (Korean: 옥중화; Hanja: 獄中花; RR: Okjunghwa) is a 2016 South Korean drama television series starring Jin Se-yeon, Go Soo, Kim Mi-sook, Jung Joon-ho, Park Joo-mi, Yoon Joo-hee, Kim Soo-yeon, Jun Kwang-ryul and Choi Tae-joon. It is MBC's special project drama to commemorate the network's 55th-founding anniversary. The drama also marks the 3rd time collaboration between director Lee Byung-hoon and writer Choi Wan-kyu, after Hur Jun and Sangdo. This program marks the comeback of Go Soo to MBC 15 years after his last series Mom and Sister. It replaced Marriage Contract and aired on MBC every Saturday and Sunday at 22:00 (KST) for 51 episodes from April 30 to November 6, 2016.

== Plot ==
Set during the Joseon period, the series details the story of Ok-nyeo (Jin Se-yeon), a girl who was born and raised in prison, and her adventures with the mysterious Yun Tae-won (Go Soo). She later becomes an advocate for the poor and is unfairly accused through the Waeji-bu, the private litigation system in Joseon.

Lim Kkeok-jeong and Hwang Jin-yi were only mentioned, but they were not helping roles, and there was no appearance of Dae Jang Geum. Rather, it was Yoon Tae-won, Sung Ji-heon, and Myeongjong who helped the most.

== Cast ==
=== Main cast ===
- Jin Se-yeon as Ok-nyeo/Lee Seo-won
  - Jung Da-bin as young Ok-nyeo
- Go Soo as Yun Tae-won
  - Jung Yoon-seok as young Yun Tae-won
- Kim Mi-sook as Queen Munjeong
- Jung Joon-ho as Yun Won-hyeong
- Park Joo-mi as Jeong Nan-jeong
- Yoon Joo-hee as Yi So-jeong
- Kim Soo-yeon as Yun Shin-hye
  - Roh Jeong-eui as young Yun Shin-hye
- Jun Kwang-ryul as Park Tae-su
- Choi Tae-joon as Seong Ji-heon, Podocheong's Captain (포도종사관); then key person at Ministry of Personnel 이조장랑.

=== People of Jeonokseo ===
Jeonokseo (전옥서, 典獄暑): Royal Prison

- Jung Eun-pyo as Ji Cheon-deuk, Jeonokseo's scribe (서리), Ok-nyeo's adoptive father
- Kim Eung-soo, special appearance, as Jeonokseo's director E01
- Choi Min-chul as Jeong Dae-sik (Jeonokseo's director, 전옥서 주부, rank 6)
- Im Jeong-ha as Lee Hyo-sung (Jeonokseo's curator, 봉사 rk8)
- Park Gil-soo as Yoo Jong-hoe (Jeonokseo's assistant curator, 참봉 rk9)
- Ahn Yeo-jin as Yu-geum, kitchen damo
- Goo Hye-ryung as Deok-boon, jail damo
- Jo Yoon-ho as Jae-deok (Jeonokseo's jailer)
- Shorry J as Cheon-doong, pickpocket.
- Lee Se-chang as Jeon Woo-chi
- Joo Jin-mo as Tojeong Yi Ji-ham, philosophy and strategy teacher of Ok-nyeo.
- Lee Jeong-yong as Go Dae-gil

=== Mapo-Songpa merchants ===
- Lee Hee-do as Gong Jae-myung
- Kim Hyung-beom as Do-chi
- Wi Yang-ho as Jak-doo
- Kim Ik-tae as Seong Hwan-ok

=== People around Jeong Nan-jeong and Yun Won-hyung ===
- Yoon Yoo-sun, special appearance as Lady Kim, Yun Won-hyeong's legal wife (김씨 부인, 정실). Exiled at Anggukdong 앙국동, then poisoned.
- Maeng Sang-hoon as Jeong Mak-gae, brother of Jeong Nan-jeong.
- Kim Yoon-kyung as Min Dong-joo, head merchant, wife of Jeong Mak-gae.
- Lee Ip-sae as Oh Jong-geum, lady in waiting then 'Second Madam' of Yun Won-hyeong
- Heo Ji-eun as Cheon Sun-geum,
- Yeo Ho-min as Dong Chang, henchman of Jeong Nan-jeong.
- Yoon Yong-hyun as Jeong Man-ho (Jeong Nan-jeong's younger cousin)

=== People of gisaeng house Sosoru ===
- Oh Na-ra as Hwang Gyo-ha, Head Gisaeng
- Jung Byung-cheol as Seong Cha-heum, administrator
- Yoon Joo-hee as Yi So-jeong, main cast, 2nd Head Gisaeng, from Songdo
- Lee Ji-seon as Chae-seon
- Son Ga-young as Da-jeong
- Kim Ji-eun as Myo-hyang
- Son Na-rae as Shin-bi
- Kim Seon-kyung, cameo, as Tae-won's mother ***

=== People in the Palace ===
- Seo Ha-joon as King Myeongjong
- Lee Seung-ah as Court Lady Han (상궁, Myeongjong's palace), former friend of late Ga-bi.
- Ryu Seung-gook as Han Jae-seo (Naegeumwi's Captain, 내금위 종사관, Myeongjong's palace)
- Gong Jae-won as Chief Eunuch (Myeongjong's palace)
- Kim Mi-sook as Queen Munjeong, main cast
- Kwak Min-ho as Gi Chun-su (Naegeumwi's Captain, 내금위 종사관, Queen Dowager's palace)
- Kim Min-kyung as Court Lady Kim, (상궁, Queen Dowager's palace)
- Kim Beop-rae as King Jungjong (Ok-nyeo's biological father)
- Bae Geu-rin as Ga-bi (Ok-nyeo's mother)
- Park Joo-hyung as Lee Myung-heon (former Naegeumwi's Captain, Jungjong's reign)
- Jung Sung-woon as Prince Deokheung (son of King Jungjong)
- Kim Hyun-bin as Prince Haseong (later King Seonjo, third son of Prince Deokheung)

Naegeumwi (내금위; 內禁衛): the Palace Guards

=== Special Service (chetamin, 체탐인) ===
- Jun Kwang-ryul, special appearance, as Park Tae-su, former head of chetamin, then teacher of Chinese and martial arts of Ok-nyeo.
- Im Ho as Gang Seon-ho, current head of chetamin. Undercover as Podocheong's lieutenant, then secretary of the War Minister (Daeyun).
- Seo Beom-sik as Ju Cheol-gi, instructor. Kills Park Tae-su by order of Yun Won-hyeong. Soyun faction.
- Park Jeong-woo as Yun Tae-gyu
- Yoon Young-joo as Min Su-ok, former Court Lady (Jungjong's reign)
- Go Eun-soo as Cho-hee, Ok-nyeo's escort warrior

=== People of Podocheong ===
Podocheong (포도청, 捕盜廳): Agency to Arrest the Thieves

- Kim Tae-young as Podocheong's Chief (포도대장)
- Choi Tae-joon as Seong Ji-heon, main cast, Podocheong's Captain (포도종사관) until E22
- Yun Jin-ho as Podocheong's Captain (포도종사관) until E37
- Ahn Shin-woo as Podocheong's Captain (포도종사관) from E44
- Lee Bong-won as Yang Dong-gu (lieutenant, 포도부장)
- Jung Woo-shik as Song Seok-wu (lieutenant, 포도부장)

=== People of Pyeongsiseo ===
Pyeongsiseo (평시서, 平市署): Marketing Control Office

- Sin Guk as Yi Young-shin, Pyeongsiseo's Superintendent 평시서 제조. Yeonggam ranked. E18, E36sqq
- Yi Jong-gu as Pyeongsiseo's Superintendent (interim E23)
- Go Soo, as Yun Tae-won, main cast, Pyeongsiseo's Administrator 평시서 주부, rank 6a (E23-E40).
- Kim Kyung-ryong as Oh Dal-joong, former Pyeongsiseo's Administrator 평시서 주부
- Yi Jae-jun (이재준) as Jo Se-Oh, Pyeongsiseo's assistant
- Gang Jun-yeong (강준영) as Hwang Myeong-geol Pyeongsiseo's assistant

=== Extended cast ===
- Han In-soo as Lee Jeong-myung, Minister of War
- Kim Jin-ho as Jung Sang-ho, Ministry of Rites, then Minister of Taxation

Hyeongjo (형조, 刑曹): Board of Punishments (Ministry of Justice)

- Son Seon-geun as Kim Tae-jeong, Ministry of Justice's secretary, 형조참의, rank 3a

Sogyeokseo (소격서): A government office which handled the ritual aspect of Taoism of heaven, earth and stars

- Song Yong-tae as Sogyeokseo's assistant commissioner

Gamyeong (감영): Provincial Governor's Office

- Cha Geon-woo as Hwanghae Province's governor
- Lee Chan as Jang Seon-poong (Haeju Provincial Governor's Office's clerk)
- Lee Joo-seok as Lee Jeong-gook (interpreter)

=== Others ===
- Kim Ji-eun as Myu-hyang
- Han Da-eun as Seon-hwa
- Song Young-woong as Oh Jang-hyun, Ming's Eunuch, Joseon-born
- Bong Hye-seon
- Kim Jeong-seok
- Bang Gil-seung
- Yang Jae-young
- Yoo Sang-jae
- Lee Jin-mok
- Ra Yoon-chan
- Ahn Soo-ho
- Kim Tae-beom
- Min Byung-wook
- Yoon Sung-won
- Lee Doo-seok
- Baek Min as Kim Moon-chang
- Lee Joo-seok
- Jung Jin as Atayi (Jurchen tribe)
- Jang Moon-gyu
- Kim Dae-heung
- Yoon Jong-goo
- Kwon Beom-taek
- Kang Cheol-sung
- Jung Dong-gyu as Lee Myung-woo
- Lee Sook as Yeo Joo-daek
- Sung Chan-ho
- Choi Gyo-sik
- Lee Yoon-sang
- Lee Gyu-seop
- Jung Eun-sung as Myung-seon
- Maeng Bong-hak
- Seo Ha-joon as Man-ok
- Park Sung-gyun
- Baek Seung-cheol
- Kim Yoon-tae
- Kim Joo-hwang
- Choi Yoon-joon
- Park Geon-rak
- Song Jin-woo
- Jang Tae-min
- Yoo Ha-bok as bandit boss
- Im Sung-pyo
- Ri Min
- Lee Chang
- Jeon Hae-ryong
- Seol In-ah as young Court Lady Han
- Sung Hyun-mi
- Kim Mi-so as Mong-shil
- Son Gwang-eop
- Choi Jong-nam as Ma Chang-do
- Bae Do-hwan
- Shin Joon-young
- Jung Hyun-seok
- Ahn Min-sang
- Na Sung-gyun
- Moon Cheol-hoon
- Yoon Sung-hyun
- Kim Kwang-tae
- Kim Jin-seo
- Jo Jeong-moon
- Kang Hak-soo
- Go Han-min
- Uhm Tae-ok
- Park Ik-joon
- Lee Taek-geun
- Mi Seok
- Ha Soo-ho
- Park No-sik
- Yoon Hyuk-jin
- Jang Gyeok-soo
- Song Kyung-eui
- Min Joon-hyun

== Ratings ==
In the table below, the blue numbers represent the lowest ratings and the red numbers represent the highest ratings.

Episode #	Original broadcast date	Average audience share			
Episode #	Original broadcast date	TNmS Ratings		AGB Nielsen Ratings	
Episode #	Original broadcast date	Nationwide	Seoul National Capital Area	Nationwide	Seoul National Capital Area
Special	April 27, 2016	8.3% (18th)	8.9% (14th)	8.7% (17th)	10.5% (7th)
1	April 30, 2016	16.2% (2nd)	17.3% (3rd)	17.3% (2nd)	18.8% (2nd)
2	May 1, 2016	18.4% (2nd)	20.1% (2nd)	20.0% (2nd)	21.9% (2nd)
3	May 7, 2016	16.6% (2nd)	19.2% (2nd)	16.9% (2nd)	19.2% (2nd)
4	May 8, 2016	17.6% (2nd)	20.7% (2nd)	19.5% (2nd)	21.7% (2nd)
5	May 14, 2016	18.7% (2nd)	20.9% (2nd)	20.3% (2nd)	22.1% (2nd)
6	May 15, 2016	17.9% (2nd)	20.6% (2nd)	19.8% (2nd)	21.7% (2nd)
7	May 21, 2016	15.9% (2nd)	18.5% (2nd)	16.5% (2nd)	17.7% (2nd)
8	May 22, 2016	15.8% (3rd)	16.9% (2nd)	17.7% (2nd)	19.0% (2nd)
9	May 28, 2016	15.4% (2nd)	16.5% (2nd)	17.2% (2nd)	18.5% (2nd)
10	May 29, 2016	16.4% (2nd)	17.9% (2nd)	18.7% (2nd)	19.7% (2nd)
11	June 4, 2016	15.9% (2nd)	16.3% (2nd)	16.8% (2nd)	17.7% (2nd)
12	June 11, 2016	15.2% (2nd)	16.7% (2nd)	16.9% (2nd)	17.9% (2nd)
13	June 12, 2016	15.2% (3rd)	16.7% (2nd)	19.0% (2nd)	20.6% (2nd)
14	June 18, 2016	14.8% (2nd)	16.1% (3rd)	17.3% (2nd)	17.8% (2nd)
15	June 19, 2016	16.0% (3rd)	17.2% (3rd)	18.7% (2nd)	19.1% (2nd)
16	June 25, 2016	14.8% (2nd)	16.4% (2nd)	17.2% (2nd)	18.2% (2nd)
17	June 26, 2016	15.9% (3rd)	17.8% (2nd)	18.3% (2nd)	19.0% (2nd)
18	July 2, 2016	15.8% (2nd)	16.2% (2nd)	19.0% (2nd)	20.1% (2nd)
19	July 3, 2016	16.7% (3rd)	17.7% (2nd)	18.7% (3rd)	19.9% (3rd)
20	July 9, 2016	15.4% (3rd)	16.4% (2nd)	18.4% (2nd)	20.1% (2nd)
21	July 10, 2016	16.7% (3rd)	17.6% (2nd)	18.9% (2nd)	20.6% (2nd)
22	July 16, 2016	15.8% (3rd)	17.2% (3rd)	19.6% (2nd)	21.3% (2nd)
23	July 17, 2016	15.8% (3rd)	15.3% (4th)	19.9% (2nd)	21.5% (2nd)
24	July 23, 2016	18.1% (2nd)	18.9% (2nd)	19.7% (2nd)	21.9% (2nd)
25	July 24, 2016	18.5% (2nd)	18.6% (2nd)	19.8% (2nd)	20.7% (2nd)
26	July 30, 2016	18.7% (2nd)	21.2% (2nd)	19.6% (2nd)	21.0% (2nd)
27	July 31, 2016	18.9% (2nd)	19.7% (2nd)	21.1% (2nd)	21.8% (2nd)
28	August 7, 2016	17.7% (2nd)	17.1% (2nd)	19.0% (2nd)	19.6% (2nd)
29	August 21, 2016	16.7% (4th)	16.7% (4th)	19.4% (3rd)	20.7% (3rd)
30	August 27, 2016	15.5% (2nd)	15.3% (3rd)	18.5% (2nd)	20.2% (2nd)
31	August 28, 2016	17.6% (3rd)	17.5% (3rd)	19.9% (2nd)	21.5% (2nd)
32	September 3, 2016	17.0% (2nd)	17.9% (3rd)	18.3% (2nd)	19.8% (2nd)
33	September 4, 2016	17.5% (2nd)	18.5% (2nd)	20.0% (2nd)	21.1% (2nd)
34	September 10, 2016	16.9% (2nd)	17.7% (3rd)	20.0% (2nd)	21.0% (2nd)
35	September 11, 2016	18.0% (2nd)	18.6% (2nd)	21.3% (2nd)	22.9% (2nd)
36	September 17, 2016	15.0% (3rd)	15.4% (3rd)	18.0% (2nd)	18.2% (2nd)
37	September 18, 2016	19.3% (2nd)	17.8% (2nd)	22.0% (2nd)	22.6% (2nd)
38	September 24, 2016	17.4% (2nd)	17.1% (2nd)	20.6% (2nd)	21.7% (2nd)
39	September 25, 2016	19.6% (2nd)	19.5% (2nd)	20.8% (2nd)	21.6% (2nd)
40	October 1, 2016	18.0% (2nd)	19.0% (2nd)	19.9% (2nd)	21.4% (2nd)
41	October 2, 2016	20.1% (2nd)	20.9% (2nd)	21.4% (2nd)	22.3% (2nd)
42	October 8, 2016	18.9% (2nd)	19.3% (2nd)	21.0% (2nd)	21.6% (1st)
43	October 9, 2016	19.4% (2nd)	18.5% (2nd)	21.7% (2nd)	22.0% (2nd)
44	October 15, 2016	18.7% (2nd)	18.8% (2nd)	21.4% (2nd)	22.3% (2nd)
45	October 16, 2016	19.7% (2nd)	21.6% (2nd)	21.7% (2nd)	22.6% (2nd)
46	October 22, 2016	17.6% (2nd)	17.9% (2nd)	21.0% (2nd)	22.3% (2nd)
47	October 23, 2016	18.9% (2nd)	19.5% (2nd)	21.2% (2nd)	21.4% (2nd)
48	October 29, 2016	18.8% (2nd)	20.0% (2nd)	20.8% (2nd)	21.8% (2nd)
49	October 30, 2016	20.3% (2nd)	20.6% (2nd)	22.6% (2nd)	23.8% (2nd)
50	November 5, 2016	17.5% (2nd)	17.8% (2nd)	20.3% (2nd)	21.4% (2nd)
51	November 6, 2016	19.5% (2nd)	20.0% (2nd)	22.6% (2nd)	23.2% (2nd)
Average		17.31%	18.19%	19.53%	20.72%

Remarks

- Episode 12 wasn't aired on Sunday June 5 due to broadcast of the football friendly match between Czech Republic and South Korea. This episode was aired on Saturday June 11, 2016.
- Episode 28 wasn't aired on Saturday August 6 due to broadcast of the 2016 Summer Olympics in Rio de Janeiro, Brazil. This episode was aired on Sunday August 7, 2016.
- Episode 29 wasn't aired on August 13, August 14 and August 20 due to broadcast of the 2016 Summer Olympics in Rio de Janeiro, Brazil. This episode was aired on Sunday, August 21, 2016.

== Original soundtrack ==
=== OST Part 1 ===
No.	Title	Artist	Length
1.	"Only You (그대를 그대만을)"	Cha Ji-yeon	3:29
2.	"Only You (그대를 그대만을)" (Inst.)		3:29
Total length:			6:58

=== OST Part 2 ===
No.	Title	Artist	Length
1.	"This is the One (이 사람 입니다)"	Jamong	4:11
2.	"This is the One (이 사람 입니다)" (Inst.)		4:11
Total length:			8:22

=== OST Part 3 ===
No.	Title	Artist	Length
1.	"Stand In Front of Love (사랑 앞에 서다)"	V.O.S	3:46
2.	"Stand In Front of Love (사랑 앞에 서다)" (Inst.)		3:46
Total length:			6:92

=== Full album ===
No.	Title	Artist	Length
1.	"Only You (그대를 그대만을)"	Cha Ji-yeon
2.	"This is the One (이 사람 입니다)"	Jamong
3.	"Stand In Front of Love (사랑 앞에 서다)"	V.O.S
4.	"Ok-nyeo (옥녀)"
5.	"Flower in Prison (옥중화)" (feat. Im Yoon-jung)
6.	"Light of Jeonokseo (전옥서의 빛)"
7.	"Path of Suffering (고난의 길)" (feat. Im Yoon-jung)
8.	"A Tearful Flower (눈물로 핀 꽃)"
9.	"Marketplace (저잣거리)"
10.	"Happy Damo (행복한 다모)"
11.	"Nostalgic Mother (그리운 어머니)"
12.	"Young Ok-nyeo (어린 옥녀)"
13.	"Slavery (처세술)"
14.	"Deliberation (숙고; 熟考)"
15.	"Resolve (결단)"
16.	"Chasing (추적)"
17.	"Harsh Life (가혹한 인생)"
18.	"A Chased Fate (쫓기는 운명)"
19.	"Ambition (야망)"
20.	"Dark Shadow (어두운 그림자)"
21.	"Imitation (모의)"
22.	"Stratagem (계략)"
23.	"Getaway (도주)"

== Awards and nominations ==
Year	Award	Category	Recipient	Result
2016	11th Seoul International Drama Awards	Outstanding Korean Drama	The Flower in Prison	Won
2016	5th APAN Star Awards	Grand Prize (Daesang)	Go Soo	Nominated
2016	5th APAN Star Awards	Top Excellence Award, Actor in a Serial Drama	Go Soo	Nominated
2016	9th Korea Drama Awards	Best Production Director	Lee Byung-hoon, Choi Jeong-kyu	Nominated
2016	9th Korea Drama Awards	Excellence Award, Actress	Jin Se-yeon	Nominated
2016	9th Korea Drama Awards	Best New Actor	Seo Ha-joon	Won
2016	MBC Drama Awards	Grand Prize (Daesang)	Jin Se-yeon	Nominated
2016	MBC Drama Awards	Drama of the Year	The Flower in Prison	Nominated
2016	MBC Drama Awards	Top Excellence Award, Actor in a Special Project Drama	Go Soo	Nominated
2016	MBC Drama Awards	Top Excellence Award, Actress in a Special Project Drama	Kim Mi-sook	Nominated
2016	MBC Drama Awards	Excellence Award, Actor in a Special Project Drama	Seo Ha-joon	Won
2016	MBC Drama Awards	Excellence Award, Actor in a Special Project Drama	Choi Tae-joon	Nominated
2016	MBC Drama Awards	Excellence Award, Actress in a Special Project Drama	Jin Se-yeon	Won
2016	MBC Drama Awards	Golden Acting Award, Actor in a Special Project Drama	Jung Joon-ho	Won
2016	MBC Drama Awards	Best Young Actress	Jung Da-bin	Won
2016	MBC Drama Awards	Best Couple Award	Seo Ha-joon and Jin Se-yeon	Nominated
