= 9th Korea Drama Awards =

2016 edition of award ceremony

- Date: October 7, 2016
- Site: Gyeongnam Culture and Art Center, Jinju, South Gyeongsang Province
- Hosted by: Kim Sae-ron; Oh Sang-jin

The 9th Korea Drama Awards is an awards ceremony for excellence in television in South Korea. It was held at the Gyeongnam Culture and Art Center in Jinju, South Gyeongsang Province on October 7, 2016. The nominees were chosen from Korean dramas that aired from October 2015 to September 2016.

== Nominations and winners ==
(Winners denoted in bold)

Grand Prize (Daesang)	Best Drama
**Kim So-yeon** - **Happy Home**; Kim Rae-won - The Doctors; Park Shin-yang - My Lawyer, Mr. Jo; Song Joong-ki - Descendants of the Sun	**Descendants of the Sun (KBS2)**; The Doctors (SBS); Signal (tvN); Six Flying Dragons (SBS)
Best Production Director	Best Screenplay
**Kim Jin-min** - **Marriage Contract**; Kim Won-seok - Signal; Lee Byung-hoon and Choi Jeong-kyu - The Flower in Prison; Shin Kyung-soo - Six Flying Dragons	**Noh Hee-kyung** - **Dear My Friends**; Kim Eun-hee - Signal; Kim Eun-sook - Descendants of the Sun; Kim Tae-hee - A Beautiful Mind
Top Excellence Award, Actor	Top Excellence Award, Actress
**Ahn Jae-hyun** - **Cinderella with Four Knights**; **Jang Hyun-sung** - **The Doctors**; So Ji-sub - Oh My Venus; Yoo Seung-ho - Remember	**Baek Jin-hee** - **My Daughter, Geum Sa-wol**; Kim Hyun-joo - I Have a Lover; Park Shin-hye - The Doctors; Seo Hyun-jin - Another Oh Hae-young
Excellence Award, Actor	Excellence Award, Actress
**Jo Jae-yoon** - **Descendants of the Sun**; Lee Seo-jin - Marriage Contract; Park Bo-gum - Love in the Moonlight; Park Hae-jin - Cheese in the Trap	**Park Se-young** - **My Daughter, Geum Sa-wol**; Han Ye-seul - Madame Antoine: The Love Therapist; Hwang Jung-eum - Lucky Romance; Jin Se-yeon - The Flower in Prison
Best New Actor	Best New Actress
**Seo Ha-joon** - **The Flower in Prison**; Ahn Jae-hong - Reply 1988; Kim Min-seok - Descendants of the Sun; Lee Dong-hwi - Reply 1988	**Kim Sae-ron** - **Mirror of the Witch**; Kim Go-eun - Cheese in the Trap; Lee Hye-ri - Reply 1988; Nana - The Good Wife
Best Original Soundtrack	Special Jury Prize
**"It's Okay Because I Am A Mom" (Insooni)** - **My Mom**; "Don't Worry Dear" (Lee Juck) - Reply 1988; "Tell Me" (Soyou) - Lucky Romance; "You Are My Everything" (Gummy) - Descendants of the Sun	**So Yoo-jin** - **Five Enough**
Lifetime Achievement Award	Hallyu Star Award
**Im Dong-jin** - **The Jingbirok: A Memoir of Imjin War**	**Han Seung-yeon** - **Hello, My Twenties!**
Hot Star Award	Star of the Year Award
**Lee Ki-woo** - **Memory**	**Kim So-yeon** - **Happy Home**
Global Star Award	Global Management Award
**Ahn Jae-hyun** - **Cinderella with Four Knights**	**Moon Bo-mi**
