= Lee San, Wind of the Palace =

2007 South Korean television series

- Promotional poster
- Also known as: Yi San
- Hangul: 이산
- Hanja: 李祘
- RR: I San
- MR: I San
- Genre: Historical
- Written by: Kim Yi-young
- Directed by: Lee Byung-hoon
- Starring: Lee Seo-jin; Han Ji-min
- Composer: Lim Se-hyeon
- Country of origin: South Korea
- Original language: Korean
- No. of episodes: 77

Production
- Executive producer: Jo Joo
- Producer: Park Chang-shik
- Camera setup: Multi-camera
- Running time: 70 minutes
- Production company: Kim Jong-hak Production

Original release
- Network: MBC TV
- Release: September 16, 2007 – July 2, 2008

Lee San, Wind of the Palace, also known as Yi San (Korean: 이산), is a 2007 South Korean historical drama, starring Lee Seo-jin and Han Ji-min. It aired on MBC from September 17, 2007 to June 16, 2008 on Mondays and Tuesdays at 21:55. The series was directed by Lee Byung-hoon, who also created the award-winning television series Dae Jang Geum.

Lee Seo-jin and Han Ji-min received recognition for their performances at the MBC Drama Awards.

== Synopsis ==
The series dramatizes the life of Korea's King Jeongjo, the 22nd ruler of the Joseon Dynasty. Jeongjo is remembered in Korean history for his sympathy with the plight of the common man, in spite of his own pampered upbringing as royalty.

The drama begins with the King's early years, during which he befriends two children working in the Palace who are later expelled. King Yeongjo (Yi San's grandfather) seals San's father, Crown Prince Sado, in a rice chest with no food or water because he fears that the Crown Prince is planning a coup. San wants to save his father, and with the help of his friends Seong Song-yeon and Park Dae-su, begs King Yeongjo to forgive the Crown Prince.

The drama then skips forward to Jeongjo's adult years when he and his friends re-establish contact with each other. Throughout, his position as heir is threatened by palace intrigues.

Yi San begins to fall in love with one of his childhood friends, Seong Song-yeon, whose father, a palace artist, died when she was young. The story then follows his rise to power, his assumption of the kingship, and the labyrinthine palace intrigues that he must constantly guard against from the Noron Faction.

While the show does deviate from the historical record in a number of ways, its representation of court life during the Joseon period appears to be based on contemporary sources.

== Cast ==
=== Main ===
- Lee Seo-jin as Yi San/King Jeongjo
  - Park Ji-bin as young San

The main protagonist in the series. He is the only son of Crown Prince Sado and Lady Hyegyeong.

- Han Ji-min as Seong Song-yeon/Seong Ui-bin
  - Lee Han-na as young Song-yeon

King Jeongjo's love interest. She is the daughter of a skilled palace artist and thus has a fondness for art.

- Lee Jong-soo as Park Dae-su
  - Kwon Jung-min as young Dae-su

King Jeongjo's favorite military officer.

- Kyeon Mi-ri as Lady Hyegyeong

Jeongjo's mother.

- Park Eun-hye as Queen Hyoui

King Jeongjo's primary wife, born into the Cheongpung Kim clan.

- Lee Soon-jae as King Yeongjo

Jeongjo's grandfather. He was the 21st King of Joseon before San took over.

- Kim Yeo-jin as Queen Jeongsun

King Yeongjo's second wife.

- Sung Hyun-ah as Princess Hwawan

Yeongjo's beloved daughter.

- Cho Yeon-woo as Jeong Hu-gyeom

Princess Hwawan's adoptive son.

- Han Sang-jin as Hong Guk-yeong

King Jeongjo's right-hand man, as well as distant cousin to his mother, Lady Hyegyeong.

- Song Chang-eui as Jeong Yak-yong

A scholar from the Confucian Academy and a member of the Namin Faction.

- Lee Ip-sae as Yang Cho-bi

A damo at the Bureau of Painting.

- Park Young-ji as Kim Gwi-joo

Queen Jeongsun's older brother and a member of the Noron Faction.

- Maeng Sang-hoon as Nam Si-cho

San's chief eunuch.

- Han In-soo as Chae Je-gong

San's administrative assistant and Minister of the Tribunal.

- Ji Sang-ryeol as Yi Cheon/Lee Chun

A Royal Artist at the Bureau of Painting.

- Yoo Min-hyuk as Tak Ji-soo

Another Royal Artist at the Bureau of Painting.

- Cha Jae-dol as Crown Prince Munhyo

The infant son of King Jeongjo and Ui-bin Seong who died at the age of four.

=== Others (fictional characters) ===
- Yoo Jung-suk as Seong Song-wook

Song-yeon's little brother

- Jung Ho-keun as Min Joo-shik
- Son Il-kwon as Oh Jung-ho
- Gyeong In-seon as Mak-seon
- Lee Jung-young as Shin-geom
- Baek Min as Eo-ui
- Hwang Il-chung
- Maeng Bong-hak
- Jo Jae-yoon as Kkak Jung-yi
- Lee Jung-sung

=== Special appearance ===
- Lee Chang-hoon as Crown Prince Sado

King Jeongjo's father and Yeongjo's son

- Hwang Geum-hee (Note: Credited as Ji Sung-won) as Royal Noble Consort Wonbin Hong
- Kang San as Prince Eunjeon
- Choi Jung-woo as Sado's eunuch
- Yoo Jae-suk
- Park Myung-soo
- Jeong Jun-ha
- Jung Hyung-don
- Noh Hong-chul
- Im Hyun-sik

== Episode Ratings ==
Yi San was popular and recorded a solid viewership rate (average) of 26.4% (Nationwide) and 28.6% (Seoul) and a peak of 35.3% (Nationwide) and 38.6% (Seoul)

== Awards and nominations ==
Year	Award	Category	Recipient	Result	Ref.
2007	2007 MBC Drama Awards Further information: 2007 MBC Drama Awards	Top Excellence Award, Actor	Lee Seo-jin	Won	
2007	2007 MBC Drama Awards Further information: 2007 MBC Drama Awards	Excellence Award, Actress	Han Ji-min	Won	
2007	2007 MBC Drama Awards Further information: 2007 MBC Drama Awards	Best Teen Actor	Park Ji-bin	Won	
2007	2007 MBC Drama Awards Further information: 2007 MBC Drama Awards	Best Writer	Kim Yi-young	Won	
2007	2007 MBC Drama Awards Further information: 2007 MBC Drama Awards	Viewer's Favorite Drama of the Year	Lee San, Wind of the Palace	Nominated	
2007	2007 MBC Drama Awards Further information: 2007 MBC Drama Awards	Popularity Award, Actor	Lee Seo-jin	Nominated	
2007	2007 MBC Drama Awards Further information: 2007 MBC Drama Awards	Popularity Award, Actress	Han Ji-min	Nominated	
2007	2007 MBC Drama Awards Further information: 2007 MBC Drama Awards	Best Couple Award	Lee Seo-jin and Han Ji-min	Nominated	
2008	2008 Baeksang Arts Awards Further information: 44th Paeksang Arts Awards	Best Director (TV)	Lee Byung-hoon	Won	
2008	2008 Baeksang Arts Awards Further information: 44th Paeksang Arts Awards	Best Actor (TV)	Lee Seo-jin	Nominated	
2008	2008 Baeksang Arts Awards Further information: 44th Paeksang Arts Awards	Best New Actor (TV)	Han Sang-jin	Nominated	

== International Broadcast ==
In Sri Lanka, the drama aired on Rupavahini dubbed in Sinhala from 7 July 2014 to 9 February 2015. Under the title, යහපත් මහරජ - Yahapath Maharaja
