= Lee Byung-hoon =

South Korean director (born 1944)

- Born: October 14, 1944 (age 82); Yeongi County, South Chungcheong Province (now Sejong City, South Korea)
- Education: Seoul National University – Forestry
- Occupations: Television director; producer
- Years active: 1970–present

Korean name
- Hangul: 이병훈
- Hanja: 李丙勳
- RR: I Byeonghun
- MR: I Pyŏnghun

Lee Byung-hoon (born October 14, 1944) is a South Korean television director and producer. Lee is best known for directing period dramas, notably 500 Years of Joseon (1983–1990), Hur Jun (1999), Dae Jang Geum: Jewel in the Palace (2003) and Dong Yi (2010).

== Career ==
Lee Byung-hoon began working for broadcasting network MBC in 1970, and made his solo directorial debut in 1974.

In 1983, he and writer Shin Bong-seung created the landmark eight-year-long series 500 Years of Joseon, which shifted the genre of historical/period dramas (called sageuk in Korean) from monotonous historical chronicles into the interpretation of bonafide records like the Annals of the Joseon Dynasty. His follow-up, Kim Jung-soo-penned contemporary drama My Mother's Sea (1993) was also popular, with a peak viewership rating of 51.6%.

But in 1999 Lee revolutionized the sageuk genre with Hur Jun, the first Korean period drama to focus on a "commoner" historical figure instead of royalty and powerful nobles. Jun Kwang-ryul played Heo Jun, a court physician who wrote Dongui Bogam, one of the pillars of traditional Korean medicine. Hur Jun reached record-breaking viewership ratings of 64% (fourth highest rated Korean drama of all time).

This was followed by Sangdo in 2001, an adaptation of the Choi In-ho novel about legendary merchant Im Sang-ok, and Lee again cast Jun in the leading role. Journalists coined the term "fusion sageuk" for Lee's attempts to revitalize the genre, transforming the previous lack of accessibility and narrative cliches of period dramas with its viewership of older, male armchair historians, into something more appealing to an increasingly younger demographic of viewers.

Sageuk further rose to prominence in 2003 with Dae Jang Geum (also known as Jewel in the Palace), whose protagonist Jang Geum first trains in Korean royal court cuisine before becoming Joseon's first female court physician. Domestically, Dae Jang Geum was a big hit, receiving a peak viewership rating of 57.8% (tenth highest rated Korean drama of all time). Produced for US$15 million, it was later exported to 91 countries and became one of the major proponents of the Korean Wave, earning US$103.4 million worldwide, and turning actress Lee Young-ae into a superstar in China and an icon for Korean culture.

Lee continued directing hit period dramas in succeeding years. Ballad of Seodong (2005) is about King Mu of Baekje who falls for Princess Seonhwa of the rival kingdom Silla (played by Jo Hyun-jae and Lee Bo-young). Yi San (2007) revolved around the love story of King Jeongjo and his concubine Ui-bin Seong (played by Lee Seo-jin and Han Ji-min). Dong Yi (2010) is about Suk-bin Choe (played by Han Hyo-joo) who rises from being a palace water maid (musuri) to the concubine of King Sukjong. The King's Doctor (2012) marked theater/film actor Cho Seung-woo's first TV series, in the role of a horse veterinarian who becomes a court physician. Lee has worked with writer Choi Wan-kyu on Hur Jun and Sangdo, writer Kim Yi-young on Yi San, Dong Yi and The King's Doctor, and writer Kim Young-hyun on Dae Jang Geum and Ballad of Seodong. In 2016, Lee collaborated with screenwriter Choi Wan-kyu for the 3rd time with MBC's 55th-founding anniversary drama, The Flower in Prison. The drama, about a girl who was born in prison and later becomes an advocate for the poor and unfairly accused people, cast Jin Se-yeon in lead role. The 22-years-old actress has become Lee's youngest female protagonist to date.

== Filmography ==
=== As director ===
- Flowers of the Prison (MBC, 2016)
- The King's Doctor (MBC, 2012–2013)
- Dong Yi (MBC, 2010)
- Lee San, Wind of the Palace (MBC, 2007–2008)
- Ballad of Seodong (SBS, 2005–2006)
- Dae Jang Geum: Jewel in the Palace (MBC, 2003–2004)
- Sangdo, Merchants of Joseon (MBC, 2001–2002)
- Hur Jun (MBC, 1999–2000)
- The Third Man (MBC, 1997)
- My Mother's Sea (MBC, 1993)
- 500 Years of Joseon: Daewongun (MBC, 1990)
- 500 Years of Joseon: Pa Mun (MBC, 1989)
- 500 Years of Joseon: The Memoirs of Lady Hyegyeong (MBC, 1988–1989)
- 500 Years of Joseon: Queen Inhyeon (MBC, 1988)
- 500 Years of Joseon: Namhan Mountain Castle (MBC, 1986–1987)
- 500 Years of Joseon: The Hoechun Gate (MBC, 1986)
- 500 Years of Joseon: The Imjin War (MBC, 1985–1986)
- 500 Years of Joseon: The Wind Orchid (MBC, 1985)
- 500 Years of Joseon: The Ume Tree in the Midst of the Snow (MBC, 1984–1985)
- 500 Years of Joseon: Tree With Deep Roots (MBC, 1983)
- 500 Years of Joseon: The King of Chudong Palace (MBC, 1983)
- Namgang Lee Seung-hun (MBC, 1982)
- 제3교실 (MBC, 1975)
- 113 수사본부 (MBC, 1974)

=== As producer ===
- The Royal Road (MBC, 1998)
- Jealousy (MBC, 1992)

== Book ==
- Sewora Kingdom of Dreams: Director Lee Byung-hoon's Drama Story (2009)

== Awards ==
- 2015 10th Seoul International Drama Awards: 10th Anniversary Hallyu Achievement Award
- 2010 3rd Korea Drama Awards: Achievement Award (Dong Yi)
- 2008 3rd 좋은 방송 프로그램상 (Yi San)
- 2008 44th Baeksang Arts Awards: Best TV Director (Yi San)
- 2006 Ok-gwan Order of Cultural Merit
- 2005 6th 방송인상 방송제작 부문 개인 수상 (Yeouido Club)
- 2004 자랑스러운 한양언론인상 (한양언론인회)
- 2004 40th Baeksang Arts Awards: Best TV Director (Dae Jang Geum)
- 2002 Korean Broadcasters Association's Broadcasting Awards: Recipient, Drama category (Sangdo)
- 2000 Korean Producers & Directors' Association: Producer of the Year (Hur Jun)
- 2000 Congressional Pop Culture Media Award (Hur Jun)
- 2000 Korean Broadcasters Association's Broadcasting Awards: Excellence Award for Best Drama (Hur Jun)
- 1986 Korea Broadcasting Awards: Best Producer, TV category (The Imjin War)
- 1982 Minister's Award from the Korean Culture and Information Service (Namgang Lee Seung-hun)
- 1975 Broadcasting Ethics Award (제3교실)
