= The Merchant (TV series) =

2001–2002 South Korean television series

- Official DVD release poster
- Also known as: Sangdo; The Merchant of Joseon
- Genre: Historical
- Based on: The Merchant of Joseon by Choe Inho
- Written by: Choi Wan-kyu; Jeong Hyeong-soo
- Directed by: Lee Byung-hoon
- Starring: Lee Jae-ryong; Kim Hyun-joo; Jeong Bo-seok; Lee Soon-jae
- Theme music composer: Gum Nanse
- Composers: Lim Se-hyeon; Eric Rigler
- Country of origin: South Korea
- Original language: Korean
- No. of seasons: 1
- No. of episodes: 50

Production
- Camera setup: Multi-camera
- Running time: 60 minutes
- Production company: MBC

Original release
- Network: MBC TV
- Release: October 15, 2001 – April 2, 2002

The Merchant (Korean: 상도; Hanja: 商道; RR: Sangdo) is a South Korean historical television drama, based on the novel The Merchant of Joseon, written by Choe Inho. It tells the story of Im Sang-ok (1779–1855), a legendary merchant who lived during the Joseon period. The series, directed by Lee Byung-hoon, stars Lee Jae-ryong, Kim Hyun-joo, Jeong Bo-seok and Lee Soon-jae. It originally aired from October 15, 2001, to April 2, 2002, Mondays and Tuesdays at 21:55 (KST) on MBC.

== Cast ==
=== Main cast ===
- Lee Jae-ryong as Im Sang-ok
  - Maeng Se-chang as young Im Sang-ok
- Kim Hyun-joo as Park Da-nyung
- Jeong Bo-seok as Jung Chi-soo
- Lee Soon-jae as Park Joo-myung

=== Recurring cast ===
- Park In-hwan as Hong Deuk-joo
- Hong Eun-hee as Mi-geum
- Han Hee as Jang Mi-ryung
- Kim Yoo-mi as Yoon Chae-yeon
- Song Jae-ho as Lim Bong-huk
- Na Moon-hee as Dama Han
- Lee Hee-do as Heo Sam-bo
- Jung Ho-keun as Jang Suk-joo
- Jung Ki-sung as Kim Sat-kat
- Lee Joo-hyun as Jang Myung-gook
- Kim Se-joon as Bok Tae
- Kim Yong-gun as Mo Ga-bi
- Lee Kye-in as Bae Soon-tak
- Park Jung-woo as Kim Dae-hwan
- Park Young-ji as Park Jong-kyung
- Jung Myung-hwan as Kim Doo-kwan
- Seo Bum-shik as Lim Jin-han
- Park Chan-hwan as Hong Dae-soo / Hong Kyung-rae
- Na Sung-kyoon as Kim Tae-chul
- Im Hyun-sik as Yang Soo-dong.
- Shin Gook as Hong Tae-joo
- Choi Ran as Woo Yeo-ran
- Maeng Sang-hoon as Steward Hwang
- Jun Soo-yeon as Lim Sang-hee
- Lee Ah-hyun as Cho Rae
- Jung Sun-il as Sunjo
- Lee Sook as Joo Mo
