= Remember (TV series) =

2015–2016 South Korean TV series

- Promotional poster
- Hangul: 리멤버 – 아들의 전쟁
- Lit.: Remember: War of the Son
- RR: Rimembeo – adeurui jeonjaeng
- MR: Rimembŏ – adŭrŭi chŏnjaeng
- Genre: Courtroom drama; Crime; Thriller; Suspense; Mystery
- Created by: Park Young-soo (SBS Drama Production)
- Written by: Yoon Hyun-ho
- Directed by: Lee Chang-min
- Creative directors: Ham Joon-ho; Kim Yoon-hee
- Starring: Yoo Seung-ho; Park Min-young; Park Sung-woong; Namkoong Min; Jung Hye-sung
- Composer: Park Se-jun (music director)
- Country of origin: South Korea
- Original language: Korean
- No. of episodes: 20

Production
- Executive producer: Lee Jang-soo
- Producers: Park Chang-yong; Jo Gun-won
- Camera setup: Single camera
- Running time: 60 minutes
- Production company: Logos Film

Original release
- Network: SBS TV
- Release: 9 December 2015 – 18 February 2016

Remember (Korean: 리멤버 – 아들의 전쟁) is a South Korean thriller television series starring Yoo Seung-ho, Park Min-young, Park Sung-woong, Namkoong Min, and Jung Hye-sung. It aired on SBS from 9 December 2015, to 18 February 2016, for 20 episodes.

Yoo Seung-ho's performance won him an Excellence Award for Actor in a Genre Drama, at the 2016 SBS Drama Awards, as well as nominations for the Top Excellence Award, Actor, at the 9th Korea Drama Awards. Namkoong Min's performance as the story's antagonist won him an Excellence Award for Actor in a Miniseries, at the 5th APAN Star Awards, as well as nominations for Grand Prize at the 2016 SBS Drama Awards and for Best Actor at the 52nd Baeksang Arts Awards.

== Synopsis ==
Seo Jin-woo has a special condition called hyperthymesia which allows him to remember almost every day in perfect detail. His father Seo Jae-hyuk, on the other hand, has developed Alzheimer's disease, making him lose his memories. When Seo Jae-hyuk is wrongfully convicted of murder, Jin-woo vows to prove his father's innocence. Four years later, Seo Jin-woo becomes a lawyer to put real criminals behind bars, but bribery, corruption, and betrayal will not allow him an easy road to justice.

== Cast ==
=== Main ===
- Yoo Seung-ho as Seo Jin-woo

As a child, he goes to live with his father after his mother and brother die in a car accident. Using his superior memory, he is able to become the youngest lawyer in South Korea after dropping out of high school to prove his father's innocence and prevent his execution. Four years after meeting Lee In-ah, he becomes her boyfriend. He later suffers from Alzheimer's and constantly experiences sudden memory loss, which worsens throughout the series. This further motivates him to bring Nam Gyu-man and the Il-ho company to justice while simultaneously proving his father's innocence.

- Park Min-young as Lee In-ah

Apart from Park Dong-ho, she is the only one to believe that Seo Jin-woo's father is innocent, and she unconditionally supports Jin-woo during tough times. While in university, she helps her parents deliver Papa John's Pizza. Four years later, she becomes a prosecutor in order to fight for Jin-woo's father. She believes in honesty and truth but is hindered by her superiors, who accept bribes from Il-Ho Group. She later prosecutes Gyu-man and is able to successfully prove him guilty of murder, among other crimes, for which he is sentenced to death. She also eventually becomes Jin-woo's girlfriend.

- Park Sung-woong as Park Dong-ho

A lawyer with a 100% success rate, infamous for defending the rich and powerful regardless of their guilt or innocence. He is known to speak Korean with a very thick Gyeongsang dialect. When he first meets Jin-woo, he is reluctant to take on his father's case due to the high likelihood of losing. But since Jin-woo reminds him of his younger self, he softens his heart and takes on the case. However, he eventually tanks the case under pressure from the Il-Ho Group. He then signs under the Il-Ho legal team, but still supports Jin-woo deep in his heart. It is also revealed that the car accident his father caused many years ago is the same one that killed Jin-woo's mother and brother. Jin-woo eventually lets go of his hatred towards Dong-ho and forgives him, and they team up to expose Nam Gyu-man's crimes and the corruption of the Il-ho Group.

- Namkoong Min as Nam Gyu-man

A twisted and wealthy antagonist, Nam Gyu-man is responsible for the crime that Seo Jin-woo's father is wrongly accused of. He is ruthless, violent, and brutal, to the extent that his company maintains a separate legal team to handle the fallout of his behavior. He also has a terrible fear of his father's wrath. Nam Gyu-man goes on to commit more heinous and treacherous acts throughout the series, demonstrating a lack of remorse, disregarding right and wrong, and having no regard for human life. Eventually, Nam Gyu-man is arrested and brought to trial for the murder of Oh Jung-ah among his many other crimes. He is found guilty, convicted, and sentenced to death. In the series finale, he commits suicide by hanging while in solitary confinement on death row.

- Jung Hye-sung as Nam Yeo-kyung

Living in an upper-class bubble, Yeo-kyung is Nam Gyu-man's sister and is adored by her father. She is also Lee In-ah's classmate and colleague, and is quickly attracted to Seo Jin-woo because of his amazing skills. Unlike her father and brother, she is good-natured and kind-hearted, leading her to express her disappointment in them for their heinous deeds. Near the end of the series, she informs In-ah that her brother is trying to flee to China using a fake passport and identity, which allows In-ah and Jin-woo to stop him and bring him to trial for the murder of Oh Jung-ah and all his other crimes. Yeo-kyung eventually packs up her belongings and leaves her father's home for good in the series finale.

=== Supporting ===
- Jun Kwang-ryul as Seo Jae-hyuk

Jin-woo's father. He is wrongly accused of crimes committed by Nam Gyu-man and is subsequently sentenced to death. He suffers from Alzheimer's and is therefore unable to prove himself innocent, and he later dies of cancer. Finally, after two retrials, Seo Jae-hyuk is posthumously acquitted of all criminal charges.

- Han Jin-hee as Nam Il-ho

A corrupt chairman of Il-Ho company, and Gyu-man and Yeo-kyung's father. He will stop at nothing to protect his company. He is eventually arrested for corruption in the finale of the series.

- Lee Si-eon as Ahn Soo-bum

Il-Ho company's section chief and Nam Gyu-man's former right-hand man. He was obedient and loyal to Gyu-man and often serves as his punching bag, but does not agree with his extreme methods. Soo-bum eventually allies himself with Jin-woo and plays a crucial role in exposing Gyu-man as the real murderer of Oh Jung-ah.

- Lee Won-jong as Suk Joo-il

A gang leader who is also a father figure for Park Dong-Ho. He submits to the authority of the Nam family.

- Um Hyo-sup as Hong Moo-suk

A corrupt prosecutor who is excellent at fabricating stories during case trials. He handles Seo Jae-hyuk's trial and subsequently moves up the ranks to become Lee In-ah's section chief. He misuses his power to cover up the crimes of Il-Ho company, and abets Il-ho company and Nam Gyu-man in committing further crimes throughout the series. He is also Park Dong-ho's rival. Near the end of the series, he assists the protagonists in bringing Nam Il-ho to justice, providing evidence to expose the corruptions of Il-ho company. Nevertheless, in the series finale he is arrested for corruption and fabricating evidence in Seo Jae-hyuk's trial.

- Kim Jin-woo as Kang Suk-gyu

A judge with a sense of justice. The death of Jung-ah's father fuels him to ensure that criminals are given well-deserving sentences.

- Song Young-kyu as Tak Young-jin

A prosecutor and Lee In-ah's boss. He often reprimands In-ah for not working within the role of a prosecutor, but he nevertheless understands and supports her.

- Kim Ji-hoon as Pyun Sang-ho

Park Dong-ho's right-hand man, also three years younger than Soo-bum.

- Shin Jae-ha as Seol Min-soo

The son of an employee in a small subsidiary of Il-ho company. He hires Jin-woo as his father's lawyer when he is falsely accused of a crime by Il-ho company.

- Kim Hyung-beom as Attorney Song Jae-ik

Seo Jae-hyuk's original defence lawyer, later replaced by Park Dong-ho. Since the day Seo Jae-hyuk is sentenced to death, he feels guilty for not helping Jin-woo prove his father's innocence. Four years later, he joins Jin-woo's law firm after Jin-woo becomes a lawyer. He also has a persistent stutter, which he eventually overcomes.

- Lee Jung-eun as Yeon Bo-mi

A woman who once worked at Jin-woo's law firm, and whom Jin-woo helped to escape from an abusive marriage. Throughout the series, Bo-mi acts as a mother figure for Jin-woo, and is generally supportive of him.

- Oh Na-ra as Prosecutor Chae Jin-kyung

A prosecutor in-charge of Seo Jae-hyuk's first re-trial.

- Jung In-gi as In-ah's father
- Park Hyun-suk as In-ah's mother
- Han Bo-bae as Oh Jung-ah

Jin-woo's neighbour. She is invited to sing at a party hosted by Nam Gyu-man, where she is latter assaulted. Nam Gyu-man murders her after she injures his face with broken glass.

- Maeng Sang-hoon as Oh Sung-taek

Jung-ah's father. He hates Jae-hyuk for killing his daughter and only child, and even threatens Jae-hyuk with a knife in court, demanding he be put to death. Later he accidentally finds evidence suggesting that Seo Jae-hyuk is not the true culprit, and subsequently informs his attorney, Hong Moo-suk, not knowing that Moo-suk is secretly in the side of Il-Ho company. Because of this he is found dead, presumably by suicide over the grief of his daughter's death. Four years later, Lee In-Ah discovers a letter that Sung-taek left at Oh Jung-ah's memorial. The handwriting in this letter and in his supposed suicide note are not a match, indicating that he was murdered, with Il-ho company playing a part in it.

- Nam Myung-ryul as Kang Man-soo

He was the Vice President of Il-Ho company, who was married with one daughter. Kang was accused of sexually assaulting a woman named Kim Han-na. He was innocent of the crime, and the accusation was a scheme by Chairman Nam to get rid of him. Jin-woo took up Kang's case and he managed to successfully prove Kang's innocence. Kang later provided him evidence of Il-ho Company's corruption crimes.

- Lee Si-a as Kim Han-na

She was a participant of Chairman Nam's scheme to get rid of the Vice President of Il-Ho company. She framed Vice President Kang Man-soo for sexual assault to get money for her mother's operation. Eventually, she admitted in court under Jin-woo's cross-examination that she indeed framed Kang for sexually assaulting her (there was another culprit).

- Lee Seung-hyung as Lee Jung-hoon

A psychiatrist who was bribed by Il-ho company to fabricate evidence regarding Seo Jae-hyuk's psychiatric condition in his trial.

- Kim Young-woong as Kwak Han-soo

A corrupt police officer who accepted bribes from Il-ho company and was an ally to Nam Gyu-man. He was the one arresting Seo Jae-hyuk and forcing him to sign the confession by threatening him the life of his son. Kwak was eventually arrested and imprisoned for the offences he committed, and he later redeemed himself by helping Jin-woo to expose Nam Gyu-man as the one who murdered Oh Jung-ah and becoming a witness in Jae-hyuk's second retrial to testify. He was shown to have found religion in prison and reformed in the finale of the series during his final encounter with Gyu-man (who was then detained on death row before his suicide).

- Jeon Se-hyeon

The younger sister of Lee In-ah.

== Original soundtrack ==
Remember OST

Soundtrack album by Various artists
- Recorded: 2015
- Genre: Soundtrack
- Languages: Korean; English
- Label: Loen Entertainment

=== Part 1 ===
Released on 16 December 2015
No.	Title	Artist	Length
1.	"Cold" (시리다)	K.Will	4:37
2.	"Cold" (Inst.)		4:37
Total length:			9:14

=== Part 2 ===
Released on 7 January 2016
No.	Title	Artist	Length
1.	"Can you hear me?" (들리나요)	Jooyoung	4:41
2.	"Can you hear me?" (Inst.)		4:41
Total length:			8:42

=== Part 3 ===
Released on 13 February 2016
No.	Title	Artist	Length
1.	"Don't you know" (모르나요)	Jang Jane	3:19
2.	"Don't you Know" (Inst.)		3:19
Total length:			6:38

=== Part 4 ===
Released on 27 January 2016
No.	Title	Artist	Length
1.	"Hate" (미워진다)	Bro	3:17
2.	"Hate" (Inst.)		3:17
Total length:			6:34

=== Part 5 ===
Released on 3 February 2016
No.	Title	Artist	Length
1.	"Winter Wind" (겨울바람)	Jang Han-byul	3:41
2.	"Winter Wind" (Inst.)		3:41
Total length:			7:42

=== Part 6 ===
Released on 6 February 2016
No.	Title	Artist	Length
1.	"I Can Love you" (사랑한다한다할수있기에)	Bobby Kim	3:58
2.	"I Can Love you" (Inst.)		3:58
Total length:			7:16

Disc 2:
No.	Title	Artist	Length
1.	"Burning Brain"	Various Artists	1:52
2.	"Daddy and I"	Various Artists	2:19
3.	"Do you remember me?"	Various Artists	2:34
4.	"Fire Blue"	Various Artists	2:56
5.	"Frozen Epica"	Various Artists	2:14
6.	"Lamentation"	Various Artists	1:43
7.	"Last Memory"	Various Artists	2:25
8.	"Last Set"	Various Artists	1:42
9.	"Nam Gyu Man"	Various Artists	1:43
10.	"Rainy Scene"	Various Artists	2:11
11.	"Rolled Omelet"	Various Artists	2:03
12.	"Wail"	Various Artists	3:23

== Ratings ==
In the table below, the blue numbers represent the lowest ratings and the red numbers represent the highest ratings.

Episode #	Original broadcast date	Average audience share			
Episode #	Original broadcast date	TNmS Ratings		AGB Nielsen	
Episode #	Original broadcast date	Nationwide	Seoul National Capital Area	Nationwide	Seoul National Capital Area
1	9 December 2015	6.6% (20th)	8.1% (14th)	7.2% (20th)	8.2% (15th)
2	10 December 2015	7.9% (18th)	9.6% (8th)	9.7% (16th)	10.8% (9th)
3	16 December 2015	9.6% (13th)	12.3% (5th)	11.7% (5th)	13.9% (5th)
4	17 December 2015	10.0% (12th)	11.9% (3rd)	12.1% (6th)	14.3% (4th)
5	23 December 2015	11.2% (8th)	13.4% (3rd)	13.4% (5th)	15.8% (3rd)
6	24 December 2015	11.4% (6th)	13.4% (2nd)	13.4% (4th)	14.8% (3rd)
7	6 January 2016	13.2% (5th)	15.9% (2nd)	15.7% (4th)	18.1% (2nd)
8	7 January 2016	14.2% (5th)	18.6% (2nd)	15.6% (4th)	17.7% (2nd)
9	13 January 2016	14.6% (6th)	18.0% (2nd)	16.4% (4th)	19.1% (2nd)
10	14 January 2016	16.2% (4th)	20.0% (2nd)	16.4% (4th)	19.0% (3rd)
11	20 January 2016	16.1% (4th)	19.3% (2nd)	15.1% (4th)	16.3% (2nd)
12	21 January 2016	16.6% (4th)	18.7% (2nd)	16.6% (4th)	18.8% (3rd)
13	27 January 2016	15.6% (5th)	18.7% (2nd)	15.1% (4th)	17.9% (3rd)
14	28 January 2016	17.6% (3rd)	19.7% (2nd)	15.6% (4th)	17.9% (3rd)
15	3 February 2016	15.3% (6th)	18.7% (2nd)	16.3% (3rd)	18.6% (3rd)
16	4 February 2016	17.8% (2nd)	20.9% (2nd)	17.0% (3rd)	19.8% (2nd)
17	10 February 2016	15.9% (3rd)	19.3% (2nd)	16.3% (3rd)	18.5% (3rd)
18	11 February 2016	18.3% (3rd)	23.1% (2nd)	18.0% (3rd)	20.3% (3rd)
19	17 February 2016	17.9% (4th)	21.7% (2nd)	18.1% (3rd)	20.9% (2nd)
20	18 February 2016	20.1% (2nd)	23.7% (2nd)	20.3% (2nd)	22.6% (2nd)
Average		14.2%	17.3%	15.0%	17.2%

*The broadcast of Episodes 7 and 8 scheduled on 30 and 31 December 2015, respectively, was postponed due to the annual SBS Entertainment Awards and SBS Drama Awards.

== Awards and nominations ==
Year	Award	Category	Recipient	Result
2016	9th Korea Drama Awards	Top Excellence Award, Actor	Yoo Seung-ho	Nominated
2016	52nd Baeksang Arts Awards	Best Actor	Namkoong Min	Nominated
2016	5th APAN Star Awards	Excellence Award, Actor in a Miniseries	Namkoong Min	Won
2016	1st Asia Artist Awards	Best Celebrity Award, Actor	Namkoong Min	Won
2016	24th SBS Drama Awards	Grand Prize (Daesang)	Namkoong Min	Nominated
2016	24th SBS Drama Awards	Top Excellence Award, Actress in a Genre & Fantasy Drama	Park Min-young	Nominated
2016	24th SBS Drama Awards	Excellence Award, Actor in a Genre Drama	Yoo Seung-ho	Won
2016	24th SBS Drama Awards	Special Acting Award, Actor in a Genre Drama	Park Sung-woong	Won
2016	24th SBS Drama Awards	Special Acting Award, Actor in a Genre Drama	Lee Si-eon	Nominated
2016	24th SBS Drama Awards	Special Acting Award, Actress in a Genre Drama	Jung Hye-sung	Nominated
2016	24th SBS Drama Awards	Idol Academy Award – Best Drudge	Yoo Seung-ho	Nominated
2016	24th SBS Drama Awards	Idol Academy Award – Best Drudge	Lee Si-eon	Nominated
