= Four Sisters =

South Korean television series

- DVD cover
- Also known as: Four Sisters' Story
- Hangul: 네 자매 이야기
- Hanja: 네 姊妹 이야기
- RR: Ne jamae iyagi
- MR: Ne chamae iyagi
- Genre: Drama; Romance
- Written by: Oh Soo-yeon
- Directed by: Lee Jin-suk
- Starring: Hwang Soo-jung; Chae Rim; Ahn Yeon-hong; Park Ye-jin
- Country of origin: South Korea
- Original language: Korean
- No. of episodes: 20

Production
- Producer: Shin Ho-gyun
- Production company: JS Pictures

Original release
- Network: Munhwa Broadcasting Corporation
- Release: June 13 – August 16, 2001

Four Sisters (Korean: 네 자매 이야기; lit. 'The Story of Four Sisters') is a 2001 South Korean television series starring Hwang Soo-jung, Chae Rim, Ahn Yeon-hong, Park Ye-jin, Han Jae-suk, Kim Chan-woo, Ji Jin-hee, Park Chul and Nam Sung-jin. It aired on MBC from June 13 to August 16, 2001, on Wednesdays and Thursdays at 21:55 for 20 episodes.

== Plot ==
Jung Hae-jung is the eldest of four sisters, and is kind and giving to her younger sisters - even though she's actually their half-sister. In contrast, second sister Yu-jin is ambitious and straightforward, and cares deeply for family friend Young-hoon. Third sister Yu-mi is materialistic, and gets engaged to a rich man, despite being more compatible with her ex-boyfriend Tae-suk. And fourth sister Yoo-sun is a high school student with heart problems and has a crush on her teacher. Each sister struggles to find true love, and conflicts and difficulties arise. But through it all, they remain true to each other.

== Cast ==
Main characters

- Hwang Soo-jung as Jung Hae-jung (oldest sister)
- Chae Rim as Dr. Jung Yu-jin (second sister)
- Ahn Yeon-hong as Jung Yu-mi (third sister)
- Park Ye-jin as Jung Yoo-sun (fourth sister)
- Han Jae-suk as Dr. Lee Young-hoon (family friend)
  - Jang Keun-suk as young Lee Young-hoon
- Kim Chan-woo as Min Jun-ha (sports agent)
- Ji Jin-hee as Han Tae-suk (Yu-mi's boyfriend)
- Park Chul as Kim Ki-chul (widowed coach)
- Nam Sung-jin as Seo Jae-yeon (Yu-mi's fiancé)

Supporting characters

- Lee Jung-gil as Dr. Jung Jae-bong (sisters' father)
- Kim Young-ran as Dr. Jung's wife
- Kim Yong-gun as Dr. Min Yun-taek (Jun-ha's uncle)
- Kim Se-joon as Han Bong-pal (Dr. Jung's younger brother)
- Noh Hyun-hee as Kim Hwa-mi (nurse, Bong-pal's friend)
- Lee Geun-hee as Jong-shik (Tae-suk's partner at work)
- Yang Geum-seok as Kim Soon-young (Young-hoon's mother)
- Kim Ji-young as Pyung Yang-daek (Young-hoon's grandmother)
- Shin Ae as Yoo-sun's classmate
- Sung Hyun-ah as Min Su-jin (Jun-ha's cousin and Dr. Min's daughter)
- Lee Dong-wook as Lee Han-soo (American football player, Ep. 1)
- ? as Shin Dong-soo (Hae-jung's admirer)
- ? as Im Ae-ri
- ? as Supervisor Yun (Jun-ha's assistant)
- ? as Lee Shin-hee (project manager
