= Swallow the Sun (TV series) =

- Promotional poster
- Genre: Action; Romance; Drama
- Based on: Swallow the Sun by Kang Chul-hwa
- Written by: Choi Wan-kyu
- Directed by: Yoo Chul-yong
- Starring: Ji Sung; Sung Yu-ri; Lee Wan; Jun Kwang-ryul
- Music by: Choi Seung-wook
- Country of origin: South Korea
- Original language: Korean
- No. of episodes: 25

Production
- Production locations: Jeju Island; Las Vegas; Johannesburg
- Running time: 60 minutes Wednesdays and Thursdays at 21:55 (KST)
- Production company: Newport Pictures
- Budget: ₩12 billion

Original release
- Network: SBS TV
- Release: July 9 – October 1, 2009

Swallow the Sun (Korean: 태양을 삼켜라; RR: Taeyangeul samkyeora) is a 2009 South Korean television series starring Ji Sung, Sung Yu-ri, Lee Wan and Jun Kwang-ryul. It aired on SBS from July 9 to October 1, 2009 on Wednesdays and Thursdays at 21:55 for 25 episodes.

== Synopsis ==
The drama opens in the 1960–1970's, with a group of criminals that were brought to Jeju Island for manual labor as punishment under the harsh supervision of troop leaders. Among this group is Kim Il-hwan (Jin Goo), an unrefined, rebellious man with no family and no direction in life. With nothing to lose, Il-hwan escapes from the rest of the infantry after combat with one of the troop leaders, Lee Soo-chang (Ahn Nae-sang). The rest of the troop eventually track him down and corner him on a cliff over Jeju's ocean. He jumps off and drifts in the sea, and is later found by Ahn Mi-yeon (Im Jung-eun), a "haenyo" (traditional free diver). Although she is afraid of this rough stranger, she does not judge him for being a criminal and does not turn him in to the authorities. Instead, Mi-yeon hides him in caves near the shore of the island where she takes care of him. They fall in love; however, the troops eventually find them believing that he had taken Mi-yeon hostage. After Il-hwan is taken away, Mi-yeon discovers that she is pregnant. Their child, Kim Jung-woo (Yeo Jin-goo) is raised in an orphanage after Mi-yeon passes away.

The illegitimate, orphaned Jung-woo grows up into a small-time hoodlum with a rebellious temperament. As an adult in the present day (Ji Sung), he saves the life of a rich and powerful businessman Jang Min-ho (Jun Kwang-ryul), which becomes his ticket to a better life. Swearing to serve Jang Min-ho, Jung-woo gets sent to Seoul to look after Jang's son, Tae-hyuk (Lee Wan).

Tae-hyuk had grown up not knowing his parentage, until he was approached as an adult by Jang Min-ho who claimed to be his father and trained him in business management. Tae-hyuk asks Jung-woo to help him win the heart of Lee Soo-hyun (Sung Yu-ri). Soo-hyun is a strong-willed young woman who overcame poverty and misfortune to studied overseas, and currently works as the manager of a world-famous circus troupe. Jung-woo will do anything to win favor with the Jang family, but Soo-hyun turns out to be his first love, whom he'd met as a child back in Jeju. Soo-hyun, who doesn't remember Jung-woo, finds herself gradually drawn to him as he pursues her under his master's name. Things get complicated when Jung-woo is suddenly sent to prison instead of Tae-hyuk.

Jung-woo later learns the devastating truth that the man claiming to be Jang Min-ho is actually his father, Kim Il-hwan. It sets him on a whirlwind quest filled with crime, love and revenge, taking him from the glittering lights of Las Vegas to the diamond mines of South Africa.

Jung-woo, Soo-hyun and Tae-hyuk encounter each other again where it all started, Jeju Island, as they work to develop Seogwipo into a world-class city.

== Cast ==
- Ji Sung as Kim Jung-woo
  - Yeo Jin-goo as young Kim Jung-woo
- Sung Yu-ri as Lee Soo-hyun
  - Lee Young-yoo as young Lee Soo-hyun
- Lee Wan as Jang Tae-hyuk
- Jun Kwang-ryul as Jang Min-ho/Kim Il-hwan
  - Jin Goo as young Kim Il-hwan
- Yu Oh-seong as Jackson Lee
- So Yi-hyun as Yoo Mi-ran
- Han Ji-yeon as Han Sun-young
- Kim Yong-gun as Yoo Kang-hyun
- Moon Chang-gil as Moon Sung-chul
- Yeon Woo Hyun-jin as Amy
- Jo Sang-kyu as Jo Chi-gook
- Lee Jae-yong as Hyun Ki-sang
  - Park Gwang-hyun as young Hyun Ki-sang
- Choi Ran as Choi In-sook
- Kim Byung-se as Tony
- Kim Jung-tae as Han Seok-tae
- Ma Dong-seok as Lee Kang-rae
- Yeo Ho-min as Jang Se-dol
  - Chae Sang-woo as young Jang Se-dol
- Jung Ho-bin as Baek Shil-jang
- Kim Sae-rom as Ha Sang-mi
- Hong Seok-cheon as Jimmy
- Im Jung-eun as Ahn Mi-yeon
- Ahn Nae-sang as Lee Soo-chang
- Go Doo-shim as Mi-yeon's mother
- Song Joo-yeon as Se-ran
- Son Il-kwon as Cheon Il-young
- Lee Sol-gu as safe breaking criminal
- Seo Ji-yeon as Jin-sook
- Hyun Chul-ho as detective
- Shim Eun-jin as vocalist
- Kim Roi-ha
- Son Hyun-joo

== Production ==
The series, produced on a budget of US$10,000,000, was adapted from the novel by Kang Chul-hwa. Screenwriter Choi Wan-kyu and director Yoo Chul-yong previously worked with actor Ji Sung on All In (2003), which had similar themes of casino gambling and gangsters.

With the exception for overseas shoots in Las Vegas, United States and Johannesburg, South Africa, all the scenes in South Korea were shot entirely in Seogwipo, Jeju Province.

Renowned Canadian circus troupe Cirque du Soleil was also featured in the drama. They appeared without being paid royalties, in order to break into the South Korean market. Sung Yu-ri's character was also based on troupe member and synchronized swimmer Hong Yun-jin.

Production was temporarily halted in early July 2009 when eight crew members tested positive for swine flu. They were quarantined, the press conference was cancelled, and the premiere date was pushed back by one day.

== Ratings ==
Date	Episode	Nationwide	Seoul
2009-07-08	Special	7.8% (20th)	8.6% (18th)
2009-07-09	1	14.8% (7th)	15.5% (6th)
2009-07-15	2	16.5% (2nd)	17.3% (2nd)
2009-07-16	3	18.5% (2nd)	19.9% (1st)
2009-07-22	4	16.2% (3rd)	16.5% (3rd)
2008-07-23	5	16.8% (3rd)	17.0% (3rd)
2009-07-29	6	17.3% (2nd)	17.8% (2nd)
2009-07-30	7	18.7% (1st)	18.9% (1st)
2009-08-05	8	16.7% (3rd)	16.9% (3rd)
2009-08-06	9	16.9% (3rd)	17.4% (2nd)
2009-08-12	10	17.3% (1st)	17.4% (2nd)
2009-08-13	11	17.3% (1st)	17.3% (1st)
2009-08-19	12	15.3% (6th)	15.6% (6th)
2009-08-20	13	17.6% (3rd)	17.7% (3rd)
2009-08-26	14	14.8% (6th)	15.3% (7th)
2009-08-27	15	15.0% (7th)	14.7% (7th)
2009-09-02	16	15.0% (4th)	14.8% (5th)
2009-09-03	17	18.0% (2nd)	18.4% (1st)
2009-09-09	18	15.5% (5th)	15.6% (5th)
2009-09-10	19	17.8% (2nd)	17.9% (1st)
2009-09-16	20	16.3% (2nd)	15.9% (4th)
2009-09-17	21	17.1% (3rd)	17.0% (1st)
2009-09-23	22	17.5% (2nd)	17.4% (2nd)
2009-09-24	23	17.4% (2nd)	17.1% (1st)
2009-09-30	24	16.4% (3rd)	16.4% (4th)
2009-10-01	25	18.8% (2nd)	18.4% (3rd)
Average		16.8%	17.0%

Source: TNS Media Korea

== International broadcast ==
It aired in Japan on Hallyu cable channel KNTV from February 13 to November 21, 2009 under the title To Swallow the Sun (太陽を飲み込め). It also aired on cable channel BS NTV.

It aired in Thailand on Modernine TV on June 23, 2011 under the title ฝากรัก ณ ตะวันนิรันดร (f̄āk rạk ṇ tawạn nirạndr).

It aired in Vietnam on VTC1 on October 15, 2013 under the title Chinh Phục Mặt Trời.

It aired in Indonesia on B-Channel on October 16, 2013 under the title Kemenangan Cinta.
