= Sinchang Maeng clan =

Korean clan from South Chungcheong Province

- Country: Korea
- Current region: Asan
- Founder: Mencius
- Connected members: Maeng Sang-hoon

Sinchang Maeng clan (Korean: 신창 맹씨; Hanja: 新昌 孟氏) is one of the Korean clans. Their Bon-gwan was in Asan, South Chungcheong Province. According to the research held in 2000, the number of Sinchang Maeng clan was 18147, and the number of families was 5631. Sinchang Maeng Clan's ancestor was Mencius. Meng Seung hun (孟承訓), a 39th grandchild of Mencius, entered Silla as a Chinese Wujing Boshi (五经博士; 五經博士; Wǔjīng Bóshì) in Hanlin Academy, during Tang dynasty period in 888. In the Goryeo period during the Chungnyeol of Goryeo’s reign, Meng Ui (孟儀) founded Sinchang Maeng Clan after Meng Ui (孟儀) was designated as Count of Sinchang.

== See also ==
- Korean clan names of foreign origin
