= Choi Ran =

South Korean actress (born 1960)

- Born: November 30, 1960 (age 65); Gimcheon, South Korea
- Education: Chung-Ang University - B.A. and M.A. in Theater and Film
- Occupation: Actress
- Years active: 1979–present
- Spouse: Lee Chung-hee (m. 1984)

Korean name
- Hangul: 최란
- Hanja: 崔蘭
- RR: Choe Ran
- MR: Ch'oe Ran

Choi Ran (Korean: 최란; born November 30, 1960) is a South Korean actress. She made her acting debut in 1979 and became best known as a supporting actress in television dramas, notably those written by the Hong sisters.

Choi married sportswriter and former basketball player Lee Chung-hee in 1984. They have one son Lee Jun-gi, and two daughters Lee Hyeon-gyeong and Lee Hyeon-jeong.

== Filmography ==
=== Television series ===
Year	Title	Role	Network
1984	Independence Gate		KBS1
1985	I Like My Daughter Better		KBS1
1986	Drama Game: "Reunion"		KBS2
1987	A Tree Blooming with Love	Soo-jin's aunt	KBS1
1993	Keep Your Voice Down		SBS
1993	Our Hot Song		SBS
1994	General Hospital	Section chief of Nursing, Ward 132	MBC
1994	Find Hidden Objects		KBS2
1994	The Road to You		KBS2
1995	Love and Marriage	Yoon Jung-bin	MBC
1996	The Season of Blossoming Love		KBS2
1997	Medical Brothers	Gangneung hospital director Ok Sook-hyun	MBC
1997	Love and Farewell		MBC
1997	Cinderella	Park Jin-hee	MBC
1998	The Barefooted Youth	Police forensic specialist	KBS2
1998	Advocate	Sung Min-hee	MBC
1998	Legendary Ambition	Song Hye-joo	KBS2
1999	Hur Jun	Hong-choon	MBC
2000	Mr. Duke	Park Ae-ja	MBC
2000	Clear Skies Tomorrow		KBS1
2001	Pretty Lady	Manager Choi	KBS2
2001	Sun-hee and Jin-hee	Geum-soon	MBC
2001	Sangdo	Woo Yeo-ran	MBC
2001	This is Love	Park Byung-ok	KBS1
2002	Kitchen Maid	Ms. Park	MBC
2003	Into the Sun	Ji Hwa-ja	SBS
2003	All In	Manager Jang Mi-ran	SBS
2003	Pearl Necklace	Jung Myung-sook/Chris Jung	KBS2
2004	Kkakdugi (Cubed Radish Kimchi)	Heo Shil-ne	KBS2
2004	Kkangsooni	Heo Pung-ja	EBS
2004	A Second Proposal	Go Myung-ok	KBS2
2005	Sassy Girl Chun-hyang	Lee Mong-ryong's mother	KBS2
2005	Sad Love Story	Sook-ja	MBC
2005	A Farewell to Sorrow	Kim Sun-ok	KBS2
2005	My Girl	Bae In-sun	SBS
2006	The 101st Proposal	Jang Eun-im	SBS
2007	Air City	Choi Jung-hee	MBC
2007	Kimcheed Radish Cubes	Song Soo-nam	MBC
2007	Thirty Thousand Miles in Search of My Son	Nam Hyun-sook	SBS
2008	Hong Gil-dong	Court lady Noh	KBS2
2008	Strongest Chil Woo	Woman from Chungju	KBS2
2009	Swallow the Sun	Choi In-sook	SBS
2009	Don't Hesitate	Uhm Mi-soon	SBS
2009	You're Beautiful	Choi Mi-ja	SBS
2010	Dong Yi	Lady Yoon	MBC
2010	You Don't Know Women	Jang Geum-sook	SBS
2011	Gyebaek	Young-myo	MBC
2011	KBS Drama Special: "Daughters of Bilitis Club"	Park Myung-hee	KBS2
2011	Poseidon	Young-ran	KBS2
2011	Glory Jane	Director of nursing service	KBS2
2012	Big	Kim Young-ok	KBS2
2012	Reckless Family 1	(guest)	MBC Every 1
2012	Reckless Family 2	Choi Ran	MBC Every 1
2016	Secrets of Women	Park Bok-ja	KBS2

=== Film ===
Year	Title	Role
2001	The Humanist	
2002	Forgive Me Once Again Despite Hatred 2002	Department head Moon
2003	Run 2 U	Madam Kim
2004	Dead Friend	Su-in's mother (cameo)
2004	Lovely Rivals	Go Mi-nam's mother
2004	Shinsukki Blues	Chief Park (cameo)

=== Variety show ===
Year	Title	Role	Ref.
2020	King of Mask Singer	Contestant as "White Horse" (episode 273)	

== Awards and nominations ==
Year	Award	Category	Nominated work	Result
1979	TBC Miss Chunhyang Pageant	Winner	—N/a	Won
2001	KBS Drama Awards	Best Supporting Actress	This Is Love	Won
2009	Ministry of Strategy and Finance	Commendation	—N/a	Won
2009	Ministry for Food, Agriculture, Forestry and Fisheries	Commendation	—N/a	Won
2009	SBS Drama Awards	Best Supporting Actress in a Drama Special	You're Beautiful, Swallow the Sun	Nominated
2010	5th Korea Sharing Awards	Special Award from the Chairperson of the National Human Rights Commission of Korea	—N/a	Won
2011	6th Korea Sharing Awards	Grand Prize from the Mayor of Seoul	—N/a	Won
