= Hwang Soo-jung =

South Korean actress (born 1972)

- Born: December 24, 1972 (age 53); South Korea
- Education: Kyung Hee University
- Occupation: Actress
- Years active: 1994–present

Korean name
- Hangul: 황수정
- RR: Hwang Sujeong
- MR: Hwang Sujŏng

Hwang Soo-jung (Korean: 황수정; born December 24, 1972) is a South Korean actress. After her acting debut in 1994, Hwang became famous for her role as the quiet and classic beauty Lady Ye-jin in the tremendously popular period drama series Hur Jun in 1999, which reached average ratings of 54%, and a peak rating of 63.7%. She claimed the two top honors at the MBC Drama Awards in 2000 for best actress and favorite actress.

However, in 2001, she was arrested on charges of taking methamphetamine (a stimulant also known as "philopon" or "ice"), with her live-in lover, a married man. She was sentenced to one year and six months in jail, but was released on bail after serving 78 days in 2002. The drug scandal tarnished her "pure" image; broadcasters and advertisers were quick to scrap contracts, and to dodge a public lynching in the media, Hwang withdrew from the public eye for five years.

In 2006, Hwang made her comeback by appearing in the music video "Because Love is Always Like That" by WAX, then resumed her acting career with a leading role in the 2007 TV drama Salt Doll. Though she never recovered the popularity she had once enjoyed, Hwang has since starred in the Hong Sang-soo film Night and Day (2008), the four-episode Drama Special For My Son (2011), and the omnibus movie In Between (2012).

== Filmography ==
=== Film ===
- In Between (segment "A Time to Leave", 2012)
- A Friend in Need aka Yeouido (2010)
- Night and Day (2008)
- A+ Life (1999)

=== Television series ===
- KBS Drama Special "For My Son" (KBS2, 2011)
- Salt Doll (SBS, 2007)
- Four Sisters (MBC, 2001)
- Mom and Sister (MBC, 2000–2001)
- Hur Jun (MBC, 1999–2000)
- Springtime aka Days of Youth (MBC, 1999)
- Romance (SBS, 1998)
- I Only Know Love (MBC, 1998–2000)
- White Christmas (SBS, 1997–1998)
- Tears of Roses (SBS, 1997)
- Today, for Some Reason (KBS, 1997)
- When Salmon Returns (SBS, 1996–1997)
- Thaw (SBS, 1995)
- Chilgapsan (SBS, 1995)
- My Son's Woman (MBC, 1994–1995)

=== Music video appearances ===
- Jo Sung-mo - "Immortal Love" (1998)
- WAX - "Because Love is Always Like That" (2006)

== Awards ==
- 2000 MBC Drama Awards: Top Excellence Award, Actress (Hur Jun)
- 2000 MBC Drama Awards: Favorite Actress of the Year, chosen by broadcast journalists (Hur Jun)
- 2000 Grimae Awards: Best Actress (Hur Jun)
- 1995 SBS Drama Awards: Best New Actress (Thaw)
