= Im Hyun-sik =

South Korean actor

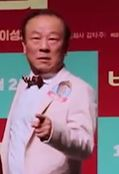
- Im in 2018
- Born: December 31, 1945 (age 80); Sunchang County, North Jeolla Province
- Education: Hanyang University - Theater and Film (1964); Kyung Hee University - Honorary Doctorate (2000)
- Occupation: Actor
- Years active: 1969–present

Korean name
- Hangul: 임현식
- Hanja: 林玄植
- RR: Im Hyeonsik
- MR: Im Hyŏnsik

Im Hyun-sik (born December 31, 1945) is a South Korean actor. He is best known for his leading role in the family drama Three Families Under One Roof (1986-1993), and supporting roles in the period epics Hur Jun (1999) and Jewel in the Palace (2003).

== Filmography ==
=== Television series ===
- Weeping Mountains (MBC, 1969)
- Chief Inspector (MBC, 1971) (guest)
- Tale of Chunhyang (MBC, 1973)
- 113 Investigation Headquarters (MBC, 1974) (guest)
- Tomorrow (MBC, 1976)
- You (MBC, 1977)
- Become a Montain and Become a River (MBC, 1979)
- Country Diaries (MBC, 1980) (guest)
- Thrifty Family (MBC, 1980)
- Royal Emissary (MBC, 1981-1984)
- Season of Love (MBC, 1981)
- 1st Republic (MBC, 1981)
- Yesterday and Tomorrow (MBC, 1982)
- 500 Years of Joseon: "The Ume Tree in the Midst of the Snow" (MBC, 1984)
- MBC Bestseller Theater – "Perfect Love" (MBC, 1984)
- 500 Years of Joseon: "The Imjin War" (MBC, 1985)
- MBC Bestseller Theater – "Pavane for The Dead Princess" (MBC, 1986)
- Three Families Under One Roof (MBC, 1986-1993)
- Float (MBC, 1987)
- Human Market (MBC, 1988)
- Teacher, Our Teacher (MBC, 1988)
- Our Town (MBC, 1988)
- For the Emperor (MBC, 1989)
- The Fifth Row (MBC, 1989)
- Bottom Search Party (MBC, 1990)
- Eyes of Dawn (MBC, 1991)
- Happiness Dictionary (MBC, 1991)
- Winter Story (MBC, 1991)
- MBC Best Theater – "Living in a Hut, Next to the Railroad Tracks" (MBC, 1992)
- Our Paradise (MBC, 1992)
- Under The World of Taiping (MBC, 1992)
- Dear You (SBS, 1992)
- Promise (MBC, 1992)
- Fifteen in the Family (SBS, 1993)
- Sergeant Oh (SBS, 1993)
- MBC Best Theater – "Sundal, Byeonggu, and Okju" (MBC, 1993)
- Giant's Hand (MBC, 1994)
- Hero's Diary (SBS, 1994)
- Lawyer Park Bong-sook (SBS, 1994) (guest)
- What Have You Done Yet (SBS, 1994)
- Our Vines (SBS, 1995)
- Auntie Ok (SBS, 1995)
- Inside the Mysterious Mirror (SBS, 1995)
- Sandglass (SBS, 1995)
- War and Love (MBC, 1995)
- Bold Men (KBS2, 1995)
- Do You Remember Love? (MBC, 1995)
- Expedition of Men (SBS, 1996)
- Their Embrace (MBC, 1996)
- Im Kkeokjeong (SBS, 1996)
- Three Guys and Three Girls (MBC, 1996) (guest)
- Medical Brothers (MBC, 1997)
- Women (SBS, 1997)
- Cinderella (MBC, 1997)
- Steal My Heart (SBS, 1998)
- Eun-shil (SBS, 1998)
- Seven Brides (SBS, 1998)
- As We Live Our Lives (KBS2, 1998)
- Wave (SBS, 1999)
- The Last War (MBC, 1999)
- Queen (SBS, 1999)
- Rising Sun, Rising Moon (KBS1, 1999)
- Hur Jun (MBC, 1999)
- Joa Joa (SBS, 2000)
- Good Friends (KBS2, 2000)
- Rookie (SBS, 2000)
- Sweet Bear (MBC, 2001)
- The Merchant (MBC, 2001) (cameo)
- Splendid Days (SBS, 2001)
- Good Friends 2 (KBS2, 2001)
- Everyday with You (MBC, 2001)
- Sunlight Upon Me (MBC, 2002)
- Daemang (Great Ambition) (SBS, 2002)
- The Maengs' Golden Era (MBC, 2002)
- All In (SBS, 2003)
- Forever Love (MBC, 2003)
- KBS TV Novel – "Buni" (KBS1, 2003)
- My Fair Lady (SBS, 2003)
- Jewel in the Palace (MBC, 2003)
- Desert Spring (MBC, 2003)
- Dog Bowl (SBS, 2004)
- Little Women (SBS, 2004)
- The Age of Heroes (MBC, 2004)
- Old Miss Diary (KBS2, 2004)
- Sad Love Story (MBC, 2005)
- Pingguari (SBS, 2005)
- Smile of Spring Day (MBC, 2005)
- Love Hymn (MBC, 2005)
- Ballad of Seodong (SBS, 2005)
- Bad Family (SBS, 2006)
- The 101st Proposal (SBS, 2006)
- Fugitive Lee Doo-yong (KBS2, 2006)
- The Return of Shim Chung (KBS2, 2007)
- Moon Hee (MBC, 2007)
- Legend of Hyang Dan (MBC, 2007)
- Lee San, Wind of the Palace (MBC, 2007) (guest)
- The Innocent Woman (KBS2, 2007)
- The Devil That Pours Red Wine (MBC Every 1, 2007)
- Aster (MBC, 2008)
- Life Special Investigation Team (MBC, 2008)
- Formidable Rivals (KBS2, 2008)
- Hong Gil-dong (KBS2, 2008) (cameo)
- Chunja's Special Day (MBC, 2008)
- Tazza (SBS, 2008)
- Can Anyone Love? (SBS, 2009)
- Creating Destiny (MBC, 2009)
- I Am Legend (SBS, 2010)
- My Girlfriend Is a Gumiho (SBS, 2010) (cameo, ep 1)
- Big Thing (SBS, 2010)
- Pure Pumpkin Flower (SBS, 2010)
- The Duo (MBC, 2011)
- Gyebaek (MBC, 2011)
- If Tomorrow Comes (SBS, 2011)
- History of a Salaryman (SBS, 2012) (cameo, ep 1)
- Suspicious Family (MBN, 2012)
- Arang and the Magistrate (MBC, 2012) (cameo, ep 2)
- The Eldest (jTBC, 2013) (cameo)
- Steal Heart (jTBC, 2014)

=== Film ===
- Coffee, Copy, and a Bloody Nose (1994)
- Change (1997)
- YMCA Baseball Team (2002)
- Tube (2003)
- Silver Knife (2003) (cameo)
- Liar (2004)
- The Twins (2005) (cameo)
- Mr. Housewife (2005) (cameo)
- See You After School (2006) (cameo)
- 200 Pounds Beauty (2006)
- Three Fellas (2006)
- Old Miss Diary - Movie (2006)
- Underground Rendezvous (2007)
- Oh! My God 2 (2009) (cameo)
- Incomplete Life Prequel (2013)
- Hope

=== Variety show/Documentary ===
- Sunday Sunday Night - Ridiculous Movie (MBC, 1996)
- MBC Prime 쌀의 변신 - Narration
- Im Hyun-sik's Marketplace of People (MBC Life, 2009-2012)
- 영상기록 시간속으로 (KTV, 2012-2013)
- With You (jTBC, 2014)
- Oh! My Baby (SBS, 2014)
- Master of Living (SBS, 2014)

== Awards ==
- 1977 MBC Drama Awards: Best Supporting Actor (You)
- 1987 MBC Drama Awards: Excellence Award, Actor
- 1989 25th Baeksang Arts Awards: Most Popular Actor (TV) (Three Families Under One Roof)
- 1990 26th Baeksang Arts Awards: Best Actor (TV) (Three Families Under One Roof)
- 1990 MBC Drama Awards: Top Excellence Award, Actor (Three Families Under One Roof)
- 2000 MBC Drama Awards: Favorite Character Actor of the Year, Viewer's Choice (Hur Jun)
- 2002 39th Savings Day: Commendation from the Deputy Prime Minister and the Minister of Finance and Economy
- 2003 MBC Drama Awards: Special Acting Award (Dae Jang Geum)
- 2004 SBS Drama Awards: Achievement Award (Little Women)
