= Jung Ho-keun =

South Korean actor

- Born: September 28, 1964 (age 62); Seoul, South Korea
- Education: Chung-Ang University - Theater and Film
- Occupations: Actor; shaman
- Years active: 1975–present
- Spouse: Jang Yoon-seon

Korean name
- Hangul: 정호근
- Hanja: 鄭祜根
- RR: Jeong Hogeun
- MR: Chŏng Hogŭn

Jung Ho-keun (born September 28, 1964) is a South Korean actor and shaman, who mostly was a supporting actor in television dramas.

In 2008, Jung played the leading role in a stage musical production of Hi Franceska, adapted from Hello Franceska, the quirky TV sitcom about a hapless human in a family of vampires. It was held at the National Museum of Korea. In 2015, Jung became a shaman.

== Filmography ==
=== Television drama ===
Year	Title	Role
1984	Spray	Jaesusaeng son
1990	500 Years of Joseon – "Daewongun"	
1991	Eyes of Dawn	Kwon Dong-jin
1993	Standing Woman	
1993	3rd Republic	Army captain Lee Hyo
1995	Jang Nok-su	Kim Ja-won
1996	The Scent of Apple Blossoms	News bureau director
1996	Me	
1997	Medical Brothers	Lee Young-seob
1997	Premonition	Director Jo
1998	Advocate	Partner at Shinhwa Law Firm
1999	The Boss	Kim Dong-sik, Chinilpa oppa
1999	Kuk-hee	
1999	Hur Jun	Jung Tae-eun
2000	The More I Love You	
2000	Daddy Fish	
2001	The Merchant	Jang Seok-ju
2002	Age of Warriors	Hamsa, the 5th monarch of Later Liao
2002	Rustic Period	
2002	Hyun-jung, I Love You	Jo Dong-joon
2002	Trio	Lee Geun-woo
2003	Damo	Choi Dal-pyung
2003	Circle Family	Oh Kyung-je's father
2004	Emperor of the Sea	Daechi
2004	Toji, the Land	Kang-soi
2005	5th Republic	Cha Ji-chul
2006	The Invisible Man, Choi Jang-soo	
2006	Dae Jo-yeong	Sa Bu-gu
2006	My Beloved Sister	Loan shark
2007	Lee San, Wind of the Palace	Min Joo-sik
2007	New Heart	Min Young-kyu
2008	Lawyers of the Great Republic of Korea	Oh Young-tak
2009	Again, My Love	Kwon Dong-chul
2009	The Tale of Janghwa and Hongryeon	Yoon Jang-hwa's father
2009	Queen Seondeok	Seolji
2010	Children's The Art of War	Grandfather
2010	Dong Yi	Byun Haeng-soo
2011	Detectives in Trouble	
2011	Gwanggaeto, The Great Conqueror	Feng Ba
2012	God of War	Seon In-ryeol
2013	Good Doctor	Park Choon-sung
2013	Blue Tower	Neutkkakyi recruit Jung Ho-keun (guest)
2013	The Scandal	Taeha Construction worker
2014	Jeong Do-jeon	Im Kyun-mi

=== Film ===
Year	Title	Role
1986	Chung: Blue Sketch	
2000	The Promenade	Kim Hong-chul
2000	Picture Diary	
2006	Hanbando	Major General Okamoto

== Musical theatre ==
Year	Title	Role
2008	Hi Franceska	Doo-il
