= Maeng Sang-hoon =

South Korean actor (born 1960)

- Born: October 29, 1960 (age 65); South Korea
- Occupation: Actor

Korean name
- Hangul: 맹상훈
- Hanja: 孟床訓
- RR: Maeng Sanghun
- MR: Maeng Sanghun

Maeng Sang-hoon (born October 29, 1960) is a South Korean actor from the Sinchang Maeng clan.

== Filmography ==
=== Television series ===
Year	Title	Role	Ref.
1991	Eyes of Dawn	Konno	
1992	Jealousy		
1995	Sandglass	Kang Woo-suk's colleague	
1996	Lovers		
1997	Star in My Heart	Heo Kwang-young	
1997	Cinderella	Bae Yong-su	
1999	Hur Jun	Kim Man-kyung	
2000	Fireworks	Coach Jung	
2000	The Golden Era	Park Jin-tae	
2001	The Merchant	Steward Hwang	
2002	Let's Get Married	Kim Suk-woo	
2002	Solitude	Park Jae-joo	
2003	Are You Still Dreaming	Mr Seung	
2003	Jewel in the Palace	Professor Jeong Woon-baek	
2004	More Beautiful Than a Flower	Husband of Doo-chil's sister	
2004	People of the Water Flower Village	Son Dong-ho	
2004	Kkangsooni	Uh Bok-man	
2004	Precious Family	Mr. Choi	
2004	Freezing Point	Noh Kwang-chun	
2005	Ballad of Seodong	Wang Gu	
2006	Love and Ambition	Kim Mi-ja's father	
2006	How Much Love	Ha Sun-jung	
2007	Lee San, Wind of the Palace	Nam Si-cho	
2008	The Scales of Providence	Shin Dal-soo	
2008	Don't Cry My Love	Bae Dae-sung	
2010	A Man Called God	Seo Tae-jin	
2010	Dong Yi	Kim Goo-sun	
2011	My Princess	Oh Ki-taek	
2011	Miss Ripley		
2011	Bride of the Sun	Kim Hak-gu	
2012	Rooftop Prince	Park In-cheol	
2012	The King's Doctor	Oh Jang-bak	
2013	Crazy Love	Yoon Moon-do	
2013	Love in Her Bag	Eun Ki-jung	
2014	Endless Love	Han Kap-soo	
2014	Pride and Prejudice	Park Soon-bae	
2015	Hyde Jekyll, Me	Director Min	
2015	Divorce Lawyer in Love	Go Dong-sang	
2015	Remember	Jung-ah's father	
2016	Flowers of the Prison	Jeong Mak-gae	
2017	Live Up to Your Name	Yoo Chan-sung	
2019	Her Private Life	Sung Geun-ho	
2019-2020	Black Dog: Being A Teacher	Go Seong-cheol	

=== Film ===
Year	Title	Role
1986	Seoul Emperor	
1986	Lee Jang-ho's Baseball Team	
2000	Picture Diary	
2001	Last Present	PD Hwang
2004	How to Keep My Love	
2005	Cracked Eggs and Noodles	
2014	Big Match	
