= P'odoch'ŏng =

Joseon law enforcement agency

P'odoch'ŏng (Korean: 포도청; Hanja: 捕盜廳; lit. agency for arresting thieves, was a government body that was responsible for the arrest and punishment of criminals during the Joseon Dynasty of Korea. It was a temporary organization at first, but was solidified into a permanent one later in the Dynasty. P'odoch'ŏng was divided into a left sector and a right sector, each assigned to the corresponding administrative district of Hanseongbu (present-day Seoul) and Gyeonggi Province. Its role was remarkably analogous to the modern police.

== Establishment ==
In 1469, King Seongjong of Joseon appointed Park Joong-sun as a P'odojujang (포도주장; 捕盜主將; Main officer in charge of the seizure of criminals, and sent him to Jeolla Province. There are 29 records that attest to the appointment and dispatching of Podojangs (포도장), "Officers in charge of the seizure of criminals", by King Seongjong to arrest the thieves that had been appearing in various regions at the time. Pododaejangs (포도대장; lit. Chief officers in charge of arresting criminals), in the beginning, were officers with temporary duties and authorities sent from the capital to quell thievery and such. However, in the fifth year of King Seongjong's reign, Yi Yang-saeng abused the power of his position, Podojang, to mobilize troops for his personal use, causing the office to be abolished, but it was reestablished on March in the same year.

P'odoch'ŏng seems to have been slowly solidifying its status as a permanent government body during the reign of King Seongjong, and completed the process after the ascension of King Joongjong. In 1481, King Seongjong divided P'odoch'ŏng into left and right sectors. The left sector's jurisdiction covered the eastern, southern, and central parts of Hanyang(present-day Seoul) along with Left Gyeonggi Province (the eastern half of the province), while the right sector watched over western and northern parts of Hanyang, in addition to Right Gyeonggi Province (the western half of the province).

The first recorded instance of the exact name "P'odoch'ŏng" appears in the Annal of King Joongjong.

== Personnel ==
According to the <Sokdaejeon(속대전, 續大典)>, a law book written during the reign of King Yeongjo in the 18th century, there was one Chief(대장, 大將), 3 Assistant Officers(종사관, 從事官), 4 regular Lieutenants(부장, 部將), each regular Lieutenant commanding 26 Lieutenants without Pay(무료부장, 無料部將) and 12 Minor Lieutenants(가설부장, 架設部將), and 4 Scribes(서원, 書員) for each sector.
