= Mom and Sister =

South Korean television series

- Also known as: Mother and Sister
- Hangul: 엄마야 누나야
- RR: Eommaya nunaya
- MR: Ŏmmaya nunaya
- Genre: Family drama
- Written by: Jo Se-hyo
- Directed by: Lee Gwan-hee; Jang Kil-yeong
- Starring: Go Soo; Ahn Jae-wook; Kim So-yeon; Hwang Soo-jung; Kim Ji-young; Jun Soo-yeon
- Country of origin: South Korea
- Original language: Korean
- No. of episodes: 50

Production
- Running time: 60 minutes

Original release
- Network: MBC
- Release: November 4, 2000 – April 22, 2001

Mom and Sister (also known as Mother and Sisters and Oh, Mother! Oh, Sister!) is a South Korean television series that aired on MBC from November 4, 2000 to April 22, 2001. The story involves the lives of Kyong-bin, his parents, and older sisters.

== Cast ==
=== Jang family ===
- Go Soo as Jang Kyong-bin (22)
- Hwang Soo-jung as Jang Yeo-kyong (mute sister, 30)
- Kim Ji-young as Jang Nam-kyong (sister, 27)
- Jun Soo-yeon as Jang Se-kyong (sister, 23)
- Jo Kyung-hwan as Jang Hak-soo (father, 55)
- Go Doo-shim as Na Jung-ok (Hak Soo's wife, 52)
- Na Moon-hee as Kyong-bin's grandmother (75)

=== Kong family ===
- Ahn Jae-wook as Kong Su-chul (Chan Mi's brother, 31)
- Bae Doona as Kong Chan-mi (sister, 22)
- Park Sun-young as Haeng-ja (Su-chul's girlfriend, 28)

=== Extended cast ===
- Kim So-yeon as Noh Seung-ri (Kyong-bin's twin sister, 22)
- Chang Mi-hee as Han Young-sook (Seung-ri's birth mother)
- Ahn Jae-hwan as Kim Tae-sung (Seung Ri's boyfriend, 23)
- Park Si-eun as Kwon Bo-ra
- Kim Yeon-joo
- Jung Wook

== Soundtrack ==
- Kim Sang-pil – My Sole Lover Had Gone
