= Hur Jun (TV series) =

1999–2000 South Korean television series

- Promotional image
- Also known as: The Legendary Doctor Heo Jun; The Way of Medicine: The Epic Doctor Hur Jun (Taiwan); The Way of Medicine (Hong Kong)
- Hangul: 허준
- Hanja: 許浚
- RR: Heo Jun
- MR: Hŏ Chun
- Genre: Historical drama
- Written by: Choi Wan-gyu
- Directed by: Lee Byung-hoon
- Starring: Jun Kwang-ryul; Hwang Soo-jung; Lee Soon-jae
- Country of origin: South Korea
- Original language: Korean
- No. of episodes: 64

Production
- Cinematography: Kim Young-chul
- Production company: MBC Self-production

Original release
- Network: MBC TV
- Release: November 22, 1999 – June 27, 2000

Related
- Hur Jun, The Original Story

Hur Jun (Korean: 허준) is a South Korean television series about the life of Joseon-era doctor Heo Jun. The period drama was broadcast by MBC from November 22, 1999, to June 27, 2000, and reached record-breaking viewership ratings of 64%.

Internationally, it aired on Taiwan Television in 2002 and Hong Kong's TVB in 2005, after the finale of Dae Jang Geum (which was also directed by Hur Jun director Lee Byung-hoon). Because of the similarities between the protagonists of both shows, Hur Jun has often been called the male version of Dae Jang Geum. It aired in Thailand on Channel 3 in 2006.

== Synopsis ==
The story is set in Joseon, primarily during the reign of King Seonjo, 50 years after the death of Jang Geum (reputedly the first female doctor in Joseon).

Hur Jun was the son of a devon ("untouchable") mother. Due to his mother's social position, he was also considered sangnom under Joseon law at the time, even though his father was from the ruling caste and held office as a local magistrate. As a result, he faced much discrimination, which caused him to lose focus and direction, and eventually led him to participate in smuggling operations. At this time, Hur Jun became familiar with Da-hee, an upper-class lady who was in exile. Her father was branded a traitor and died in exile. Hur Jun sympathized with her and handled all of her father's funeral affairs. Not long after that, Hur Jun's smuggling activities were discovered, and his life was saved by his erstwhile uncaring father, who also rescued his mother and Da-hee, and smuggled them out of their town. Hur Jun and Da-hee eventually got married and moved to Saneum, in Gyeongsang Province.

Once, Hur Jun's mother fell ill, and he sought the help of a famous local physician, Yoo Ui-tae. Hur Jun became interested in medicine and became Yoo Ui-tae's pupil to study it. He proved to have an aptitude for medicine, and being very studious, he progressed very quickly. His studies attracted the attention of Ye-jin, an orphaned lady who lived with Yoo Ui-tae and began to mentor Hur Jun in the area of medicinal usage.

Hur Jun's medicinal prowess continued to grow, but he still had no chance to practice. He received his first patient when an elderly couple brought their unconscious daughter to his house. Apparently, she tried to hang herself and had almost died. Hur Jun, with some innovative remedies, managed to revive her, but refused to accept payment for his services. The couple decided instead to spread news of their benefactor's deeds to their friends and neighbors. This unwittingly brought Hur Jun many impoverished patients who had heard he was both skilled and offering free examinations.

Yoo Ui-tae was initially angry because he thought Hur Jun had not acquired sufficient medical knowledge to treat patients in the first place and was only making use of his own name to earn some money quickly. Nonetheless, Yoo Ui-tae investigated Hur Jun's diagnoses and prescriptions for each of the poor patients he treated, and realized Hur Jun was indeed competent and correct in his practice. He was further pleased that Hur Jun had not profited at all from the poor patients. To reward Hur Jun, Yoo Ui-tae placed him in charge of the local drug store.

Later, Hur Jun received the opportunity to treat the wife of a high-ranking gentry. She had suffered a stroke, which rendered her paralyzed and bedridden. All of the physicians who had examined her had concluded that her condition was hopeless, but Hur Jun managed to cure her completely. This earned the respect of the gentry, who wrote a letter of recommendation for Hur Jun to join the Imperial Hospital; the letter was written to help Hur Jun circumvent the rigorous testing normally needed to enter. This angered Yoo Ui-tae, a strict traditionalist who saw this as a grave ethical lapse in judgement to use personal connections to bypass the exam system.

Meanwhile, two other doctors began to mentor Hur Jun, who eventually decided to join the medical examination in Hanyang (modern day Seoul). When Hur Jun arrived in Hanyang, he failed to join the examination because of his decision to treat a critically ill patient. This increased his popularity, and also enabled the re-acceptance of Yoo Ui-tae. Conversely, Yoo Ui-tae's own son, Yoo Do-ji, who had refused to treat the patient, placed first in the examination. Yoo Ui-tae rebuked his son for his lack of compassion for patients and using his medical skills to advance his political aspirations. Yoo Do-ji was unrepentant and his father subsequently disowned him.

Not long after that, Yoo Ui-tae became terminally ill with stomach cancer. He committed suicide and left his body to Hur Jun to dissect it and increase his understanding of anatomy and physiology. Thanked to his sacrifice, Hur Jun is the first doctor in Joseon to manage to draw the accurate structure of human anatomy. This greatly advanced Hur Jun's medical knowledge and made him even more committed to medicine, and in an examination for entry into the Imperial Hospital he placed first and was granted entry.

In the Imperial Hospital, Hur Jun met his mentor's son, Yoo Do-ji, who had been diligently and unscrupulously progressing through the ranks. Hur Jun also met the Chief Imperial Doctor, Yeong, who lost in an acupuncture competition to Hur Jun's mentor 20 years ago. Knowing how Hur Jun was connected to Yoo Ui-tae, Yeong placed Hur Jun in an unimportant department in the Hyeminseo Hospital.

Upon his arrival at Hyeminseo, Hur Jun encountered Ye-jin (who worked there as a nurse). Ye-jin was secretly in love with him, but their relationship would always be solely platonic.

During this time, Yeong restricted Hur Jun's career in every way possible, which ended when the brother of the King's favorite concubine suffered from stomach cancer. The doctors in the Imperial Hospital exhausted all possibilities in treating the patient, but to no avail. Hur Jun successfully treated the patient in five days before Yeong could. This ended the restrictions imposed by Yeong.

During the 22nd year of Seonjo's reign, a national epidemic occurred. An officer who had arrested Hur Jun some time ago was transferred to the palace. Hur Jun, though troubled, went to the epidemic areas to perform research for a cure, which he found. Upon his return, Hur Jun surrendered himself to the arresting officer, and was sentenced to banishment.

Just when he was preparing to leave, the King's concubine, Kim Gong-bin, fell critically ill with heart problems and none of the Imperial Doctors could cure her. In desperation, the King recalled Hur Jun, who cured Kim Gong-bin. To reward Hur Jun, the King absolved him of all crimes and wrongdoings, and assigned him to be the personal physician for Gong-bin.

However, the King began to favor another concubine, and Gong-bin's condition deteriorated. Upon her death, Hur Jun decided to travel through the country for herbs and more uncured illnesses for several years. On his return, he hid in the imperial medical library to research and refine his skills.

In the meantime, Do-ji was steadily moving up through the ranks in the Imperial Hospital, and was prepared to take over the post of Chief Imperial Doctor. However, a prince of whom he was in charge developed a strange and serious illness. Not wishing to admit his mistake, which could have cost him his promotion, Do-ji decided to assign the prince to Hur Jun and let him take the blame. However, Hur Jun successfully treated the prince, for which the grateful King promoted Hur Jun to 3rd grade officer and Chief Imperial Doctor.

A war soon broke out as the Japanese invaded Joseon. Hur Jun was credited for saving all the medical annals when the imperial court went into exile, and for reorganizing the Imperial Medical Annals after the war was over, for which Seonjo promoted him to first grade officer. A few years later, Hur Jun recommended to Seonjo to make all the Imperial Medical Annals available to the public, in an effort to make sure that all Joseon citizens could prevent illnesses before they happen.

Later, an imperial battle between Prince Yeongchang and Prince Gwanghaegun began with the second grade officer leads a conspiracy to make the child Prince Yeongchang ascends the throne so he and his conspirators could control him as puppet, and at first, Hur Jun refused to participate, reasoning that doctors should only treat patients and not get involved in politics. The conflict was ultimately won by Gwanghaegun, who ascended to the throne after Seonjo's death in 1608. Once installed as King, Gwanghaegun was pressured by his officials to reluctantly immediately branded Hur Jun a traitor since the law stated that if the king were to die of illness, the Chief Imperial Doctor would be responsible. However, Gwanghaegun thought that Hur Jun was a respectable doctor who had a lot of accomplishments including saving the queen's life, but since he could not go against the law, he lightened the punishment, and sentenced Hur Jun to exile in the Southern part of the country. At the same time, Hur Jun reveals the conspiracy of the second grade officer to the King, causing the second grade officer and his co-conspirators to be sentenced to death.

In the south, Hur Jun, with the help of imperial doctors who smuggled medical books to him, published a medical book, Dongui Bogam (Mirror of Eastern Medicine), in 1610; it is considered a classic among Oriental medicine literature.

In 1611, Gwanghaegun issued an imperial pardon to Hur Jun, and invited him to return to the palace to be the royal doctor again. This time, Hur Jun refused, and returned to his hometown to treat patients. At this time, a national plague epidemic began, and Hur Jun was called back to the Imperial Hospital to research a cure. The research was successful, but exhausted Hur Jun, who unknowingly contracted the plague himself and died in 1615 while treating the remaining patients. The series ends with Lady Ye Ji visits his grave and states that she will see Hur Jun soon in the afterlife.

== Cast ==
- Jun Kwang-ryul as Hur Jun
- Hwang Soo-jung as Lady Ye-jin
- Lee Soon-jae as Yoo Ui-tae
- Kim Byung-se as Yoo Do-ji, Ui-tae's son
- Jung Wook as Kim Min-se
- Jung Hye-sun as Mrs. Son, Hur Jun's mother
- Hong Choong-min as Lee Da-hee, Hur Jun's wife
- Joo Hyun as Heo Ryun, Hur Jun's father
- Jo Kyung-hwan as Yang Ye-soo
- Park Chan-hwan as King Seonjo
- Jang Seo-hee as Kim In-bin
- Park Joo-mi as Kim Gong-bin
- Kim Seung-soo as Prince Gwanghae
- Im Hyun-sik as Im Oh-geun, Ui-tae's secretary
- Park Jung-soo as Mrs. Oh, Ui-tae's wife
- Sung Hyun-ah as medicine lady So-hyun
- Lee Hee-do as Goo Il-seo
- Choi Ran as Hong-choon
- Han In-soo as Ahn Kwang-ik
- Kim Eun-soo as So-bi
- Im Dae-ho as Yang-tae
- Im Ho as Lee Jung-myung
- Yeo Hyun-soo as Kim Sang-hwa
- Kwak Jung-wook as young Sang-hwa
- Maeng Sang-hoon as Kim Man-kyung
- Byun Hee-bong as Sung In-chul
- Park Young-ji as Jung Sung-pil
- Lee Jae-po as Park Man-joo
- Kim Hae-sook as Ham Ahn's wife
- Cha Kwang-soo as Sung Myung-hoon
- Uhm Yoo-shin as Deok-geum
- Lee Hyun-kyung as Se-hee
- Lee Joo-hee as Chae-sun
- Oh Tae-kyung as Heo-gyum
- Choi Eun-joo as Uhn Nyeon-yi
- Lee Sook as Ha-dong's wife
- Kwon Yeon-woo as Soo-yeon
- Jung Ho-keun as Jung Tae-eun
- Jung Myung-hwan as Bae Chun-soo
- Jo Hyun-sook as Sook-jung
- Joo Min-joon as Kim Byung-jo
- Park Jong-kwan as Jung-jak
- Moon Hee-won as Song Hak-gyu
- Jung Seung-ho as Jang Hak-do
- Lee Young-ho as Gong-bin's younger brother
- Kim Joo-young as Guhwang Kwan Chal Sa
- Kim Young-min as Byung-ja
- Lee Yu-ri as one of the Court Maids

== Reception ==
When Hur Jun was broadcast in South Korea, it became a strong commercial success.

When TVB bought Hur Jun, the network had great hopes for its success, as it was a Korean drama aired immediately after the finale of Dae Jang Geum, which had a successful run. However, viewers were not very receptive to the show, and its ratings were considerably lower than Dae Jang Geum.

This has caused concern that the Korean Wave is ending, but many stated that the show had flat plots and generally uninteresting premise. Many cast members from Dae Jang Geum had been cast in Hur Jun in considerably different roles (e.g. the Emperor as a law enforcement official and Jang Geum's mentor as a palace chef), which earned a negative reaction from viewers outside of South Korea who were unaware that Hur Jun preceded Dae Jang Geum by a number of years.

In 2012, the Korean drama Hur Jun reportedly attained a viewership of over 90% in the Kurdistan region of Iraq. Its lead actor Jun Kwang-ryul was invited by the federal government of Iraq to visit the city of Sulaymaniyah in Kurdistan, at the special request of the country's First Lady, Hero Ibrahim Ahmed.

== Remake ==
A remake, titled Hur Jun, The Original Story (in Korean, 구암 허준 Guam Heo Jun), was produced in 2013 and aired daily. Late actor Kim Joo-hyuk portrayed the titular doctor; Kim's late father Kim Mu-saeng had the role in 1975.
