= Jun Kwang-ryul =

South Korean actor (born 1960)

- Born: February 11, 1960 (age 66); Seoul, South Korea
- Occupation: Actor
- Agent(s): Jaemix C&B
- Spouse: Park Soo-jin

Korean name
- Hangul: 전광렬
- Hanja: 田光烈
- RR: Jeon Gwangryeol
- MR: Chŏn Kwangnyŏl

Jun Kwang-ryul (Korean: 전광렬; born February 11, 1960) is a South Korean actor. He is best known for his roles in the television series Hur Jun, Jumong and Bread, Love and Dreams.

== Filmography ==
=== Television series ===
- Jinxed at First (2022)
- Kingmaker: The Change of Destiny (2020)
- Witch at Court (2017)
- Flowers of the Prison (2016)
- The Royal Gambler (2016)
- Remember (2015–2016)
- Hello Monster (2015)
- The Man in the Mask (2015)
- Passionate Love (2013)
- Goddess of Fire (2013)
- Missing You (2012–2013)
- Lights and Shadows (2011–2012)
- Warrior Baek Dong-soo (2011)
- Sign (2011)
- Road of Hope (2010)
- Bread, Love and Dreams (2010)
- Swallow the Sun (2009)
- The King and I (2007–2008)
- Jumong (2006–2007)
- Recipe of Love (2005)
- Love and Sympathy (2005)
- The Age of Heroes (2004–2005)
- Royal Story: Jang Hui-bin (2002–3)
- Hur Jun (1999–2000)
- Roses and Bean Sprouts (1999)
- Trap of Youth (1999)
- I Only Know Love (1998)
- Advocate (1998)
- Light in the Field (1997)
- Model (1997)
- Meeting (1996)
- Their Embrace (1996)
- Mimang (1996–1997)
- Angel Beneath the Mask (1995)
- The Lonely Man (1994)
- Shoal (1994)
- General Hospital (1994–1996)
- Ambition (1994)
- I Will Kiss Your Cheek (1994)
- Hot River (1993)
- Stormy Season (1993)
- Winter Bird (1992)
- Burn Like a Candle (1991)
- You Too, Try Growing Old (1991)
- Lost Island (1990)
- Mt. Jiri (1989)

=== Film ===
- Snatch Up (2018)
- 2424 (2002)
- Kiss Me Much (2001)
- I Wish I Had a Wife (2001)

=== Television shows ===
- Healing Mountain Lodge 2 (2021) - Host
- Santa Expedition (2022) - Narrator

== Awards ==
- 2013 SBS Drama Awards: Top Excellence Award, Actor (Passionate Love)
- 2012 MBC Drama Awards: Golden Acting Award, Actor (Lights and Shadows, Missing You)
- 2011 SBS Drama Awards: Excellence Award, Actor in a Special Planning Drama (Sign, Warrior Baek Dong-soo)
- 2010 KBS Entertainment Awards: Achievement Award (Road of Hope)
- 2010 44th Taxpayer's Day: Model Taxpayer Citation
- 2007 SBS Drama Awards: Top Excellence Award, Actor; Top 10 Stars (The King and I)
- 2006 MBC Drama Awards: Top Excellence Award, Actor (Jumong)
- 2000 MBC Drama Awards: Grand Prize ("Daesang") (Hur Jun)
- 2000 36th Baeksang Arts Awards: Most Popular Actor (TV) (Hur Jun)
