= Choi Wan-gyu =

South Korean screenwriter (born 1964)

- Hangul: 최완규
- RR: Choe Wangyu
- MR: Ch'oe Wan'gyu

Choi Wan Gyu (Korean: 최완규; born August 18, 1964) is a South Korean screenwriter and a co-founder of the South Korean production company AStory (에이스토리). He was selected as a winner in the MBC Best Theater Scenario Contest for Boring Love, Funny Movie (1993, his screenwriting debut).

He dropped out of Incheon University English Literature Department.

On January 6, 2004, he and ex-Mnet and SM Entertainment producer Lee Sang-baek founded AStory.

== Controversies ==
In 2008, he was sued for breach of contract by Always Uki Co., Ltd. (Japan) and ICBN Co., Ltd. (South Korea), the production companies of the unfinished two-part film Hidden (working title). Choi initially signed a contract with the two companies for writing the script for the movie, which was supposed to depict the joys and sorrows in the lives of Koreans living in Japan and was initially planned to be filmed in Osaka. However, he failed to finish the script on time and the project was eventually cancelled.

In 2018, under the South Korean Act on the Aggravated Punishment of Specific Economic Laws, etc., he was sentenced to two years in prison (subject to four years of probation) for charges related to fraud (committed against a drama production company owner) and illegal overseas gambling (in the Philippines).

In 2019, he was listed as a habitual high-amount tax delinquent by the South Korean National Tax Service.

In 2022, he was eventually (and currently) imprisoned in Gyeongsang Province for charges not known.

== Major works ==
- General Hospital (1994)
- Legend of Ambition (1998)
- Ho-joon's Road to a Court Physician (1999)
- Air Force (2000)
- Shodo (Sand) (2001)
- The Merchant (2001)
- All-in Fateful Love (2003)
- Into the Storm (2004)
- Love Story in Harvard (2004)
- Jumong (2006)
- Lobbyist (2007)
- Catcher (2008)
- Wind Country or The Kingdom of the Winds (2008) (nominated for an Emmy Award in 2009)
- General Hospital 2 (2008)
- Swallow the Sun (2009)
- Prison Flower (2016)

See also Category:Television Shows written by Choi Wan-kyu

== Awards ==
- 1994 MBC Broadcasting Awards Writer Award
- 2003 30th Korean Broadcasting Awards Writer Award
- 2006 MBC Drama Awards Television Division Achievement Award
- 2007 19th Korean Broadcasting Producer Awards TV Writer Category Production Category Award
- 2007 43rd Baeksang Arts Awards TV Category Screenplay Award
- 2010 1st Seoul Culture & Arts Awards Drama Writer Division Grand Prize
