= Sageuk =

Korean term for historical dramas

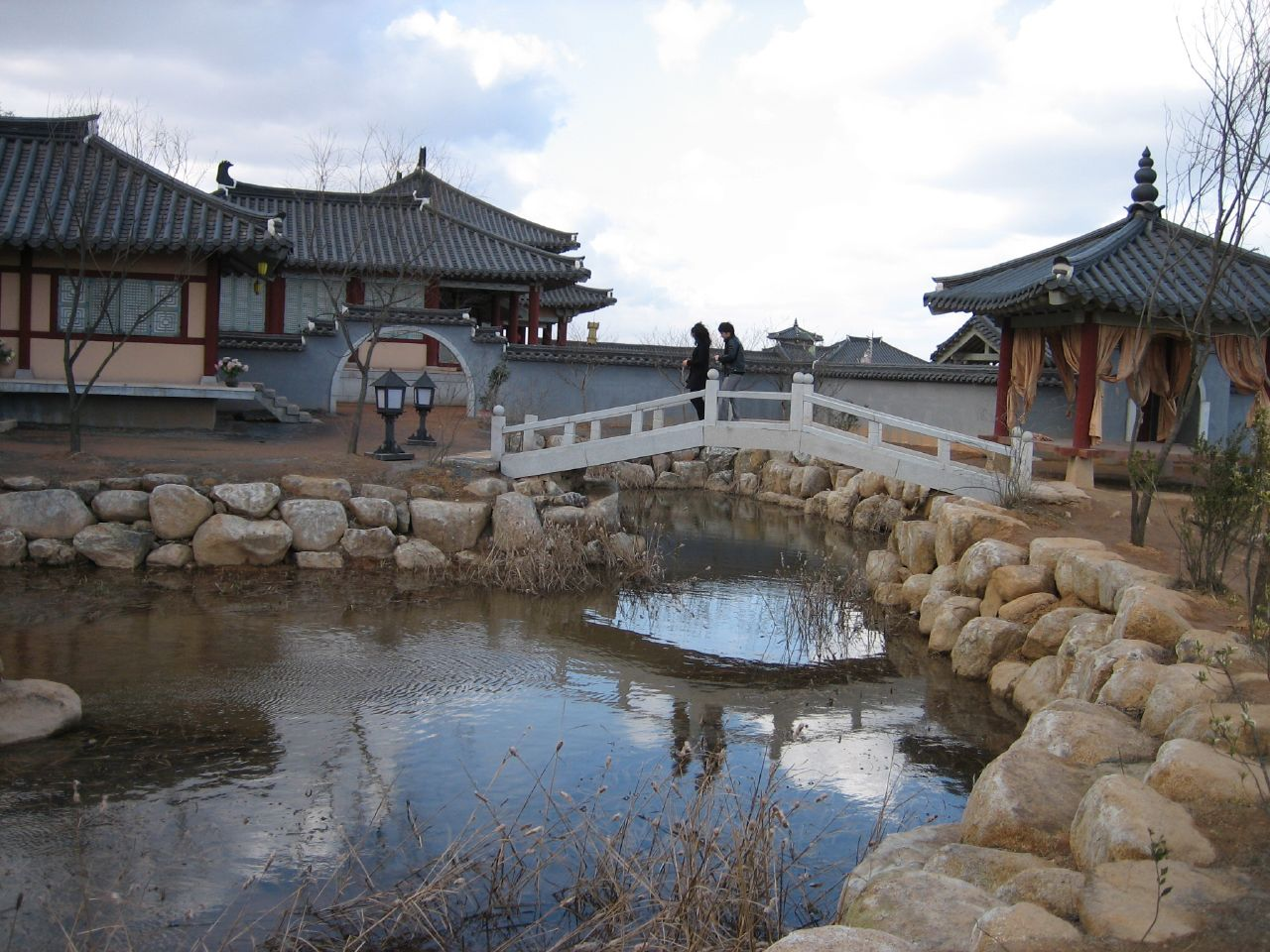
- Yongin MBC Daejanggeum Park, where many sageuk television series are shot

Korean name
- Hangul: 사극
- Hanja: 史劇
- RR: sageuk
- MR: sagŭk

Sageuk (Korean: 사극; Hanja: 史劇;) in Korean denotes historical dramas, including traditional drama plays, films or television series. In English language literature sageuk usually refers to historical films and television series (of South Korea). In North Korea, South Korean historical dramas are generally called 고전 영화 (Hanja: 古典映畫; MR: kojŏn yŏnghwa) or classic film.

The first known historical film, The Story of Chun-hyang filmed in 1923, was directed by a Japanese filmmaker. The first Korean sound film was also sageuk. The heyday of Korean cinema began in the 1950s and lasted until the 1980s, with many sageuk films released, like Lee Gyu-hwan's Chunhyang adaptation in 1955. In the 1960s, historical melodramas were significant, as well as martial arts films. In the 1970s, due to the popularity of television, cinema started to decline, and in the 1980s it encountered a crisis, which prompted filmmakers to try to win viewers back with erotic pieces. From the 1990s, Im Kwon-taek's movies, as well as The Legend of Gingko and The Eternal Empire are significant works. From the 2000s, sageuk films started flourishing, between 2012 and 2015 Korean cinema produced five sageuk that broke the 10 million viewership record. As of March 2026, the highest-grossing South Korean film was also a historical drama, The Admiral: Roaring Currents, while the 2026 sageuk The King's Warden ranked third.

The first television series, a sageuk, of South Korea aired on state channel KBS in 1962, titled Gukto malli. In the 1970s, in contrast to the previous decade, historical TV series portrayed national heroes like Yi Sun-sin or Sejong the Great. The characteristic series of the 1980s was Joseonwangjo 500 nyeon ('500 Years of Joseon'). The 1990s were dominated by contemporary dramas with regard to popularity and viewership ratings, despite having produced a number of quality sageuk. The 2000s saw the birth of the "fusion sageuk" genre, which changed the historical series genre in South Korea. Some of the significant works from this period are Hur Jun, Damo, Dae Jang Geum and Queen Seondeok.

Popular themes of sageuk include elements from Korean folklore and mythology, famous or notorious princes, kings, palace intrigue, national heroes and famous women.

== History ==
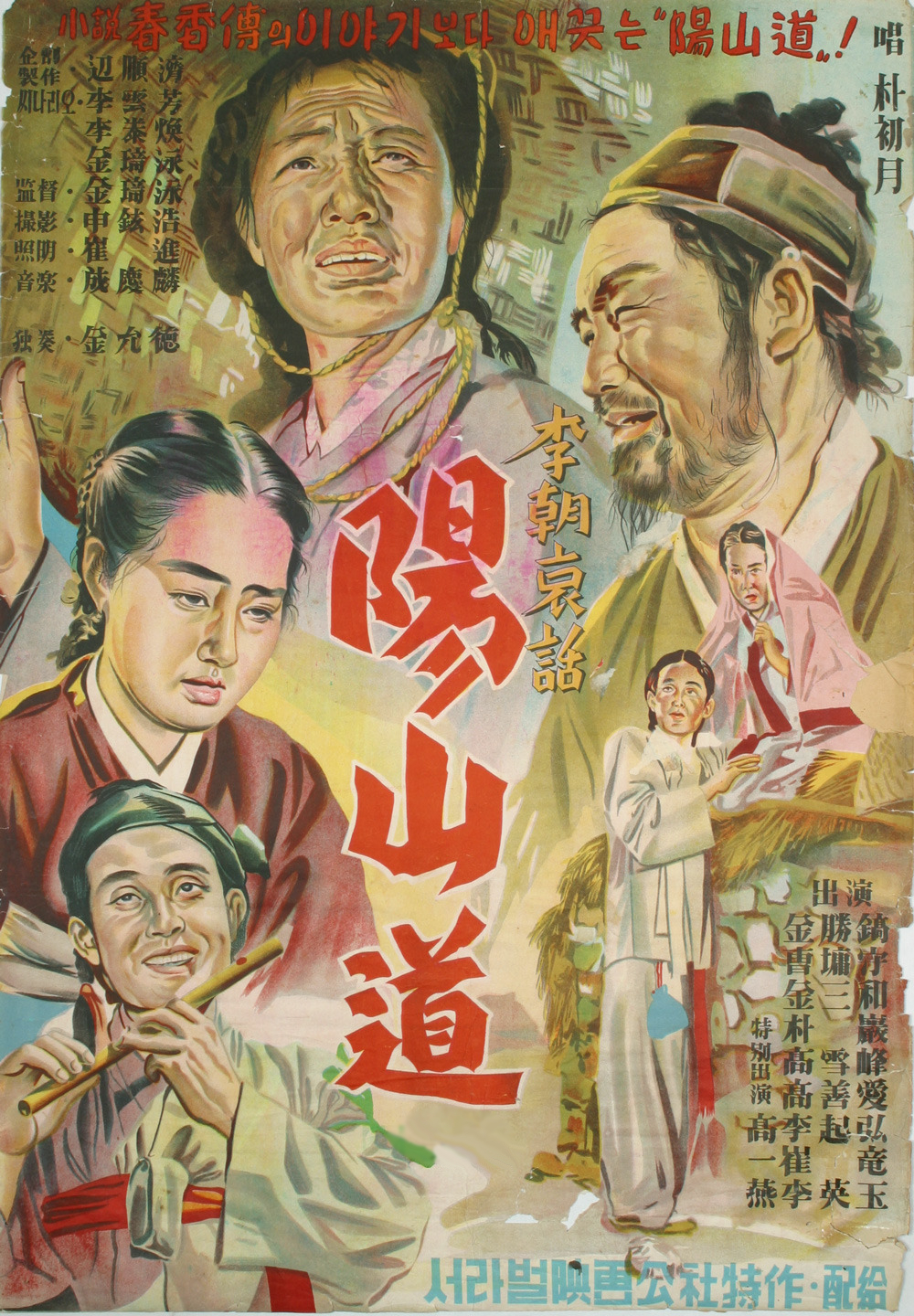
The poster of Yangsan Province from 1955

=== Beginnings ===
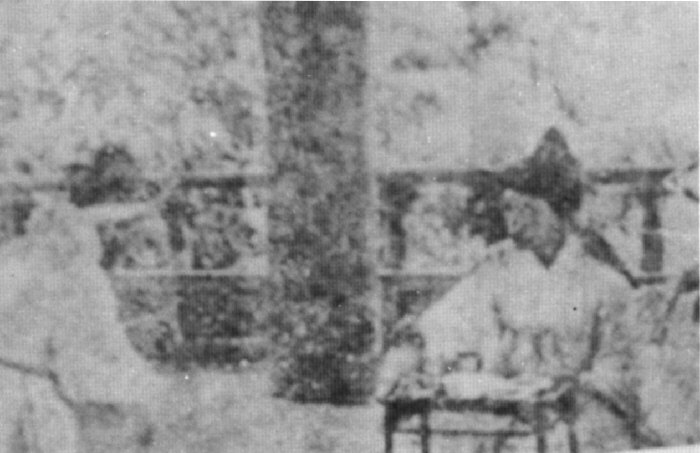
Film still from The Story of Chun-hyang (1923).

The first film which can be regarded as a sageuk was The Story of Chun-hyang, directed by Japanese filmmaker Koshū Hayakawa (早川孤舟) in 1923. The story of Chunhyang is a popular element of Korean folklore, recurring in Korean cinema, as well, having produced more than a dozen adaptations both in films and television series. Some cinematic milestones are also related to it, for example, Lee Myeong-woo's Chunhyangcheon (춘향전) in 1935 was the first Korean sound film. From 1940, the number of Korean films declined, due to the Japanese colonialist policies forbidding films other than propaganda movies. Many filmmakers fled the country, and those remaining had to join the pro-Japanese camp. After the second world war ended, filmmakers rather celebrated independence and did not make historical pieces.

After the Korean war, romanticism was the ruling school of 1950s historical movies in South Korea, often focusing on female characters. The roots of this can be traced back to theatres: grand changgeuks, or folk operas, had been popular, so much so, that they began to be adapted to film. Since these stories focused on human nature, fate, and feelings, actual historical backgrounds were irrelevant. These stories usually preferred the period of the Three Kingdoms of Korea, factual details of which were scarce, thus attention to historical factual accuracy could be avoided. In 1956, Wangja Hodonggwa Nangnang gongju (왕자호동과 낙랑공주) adapted the story of Prince Hodong and the Princess of Nakrang, Korea's very own Romeo and Juliet tale.

The 1950s to the 1980s are considered the heyday of Chungmuro, or the Korean Hollywood, when more than 100 films were produced annually. The need for historical films was boosted by the success of such works as Lee Gyu-hwan's Chunhyang adaptation (1955), Kim Ki-young's Yangsan Province or Jeon Chang-geun's Gojong hwangjewa uisa An Jung-geun (King Gojong and martyr An Jung-Geun; 1959).

=== 1960s ===
Sageuk successes of the 1960s were adaptations of works that had previously been successful in other art forms, for example as radio plays, theatrical plays, changgeuk operas or novels. Examples include Jang huibin (장희빈; 1961), Naesi (내시, 'Eunuch'; 1968) or Women of Yi Dynasty (이조 여인잔혹사, Ijo yeoinjanhoksa; 1969). The atmosphere this time was more conservative than in the 1950s, partially due to Park Chung Hee's dictatorship. Conforming to the circumstances, historical melodramas were preferred, but there were exceptions like Jeong Chang-hwa's martial arts films, inspired by the Shaw Brothers. This is the period when Joseon became the focus of attention, depicting the relationship between kings and officials, determining the nature of historical films for the next decades. Viewers were now more interested in actual historical events than in mystified, old legends. Previously, people were searching for familiar themes in sageuk, due to modern inventions being relatively new to Korea at the time. By the 1960s, however, they got used to modernities, thus filmmakers turned to decadent themes or novel stories.

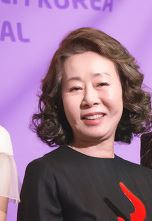
Youn Yuh-jung, who played several historic figures in 1970s, such as Royal Noble Consort Hui in the 1971 MBC TV series Jang Hui-bin (1971)

The first historical television series in South Korea was aired in 1962 on state channel KBS, titled Gukto malli (국토만리), directed by Kim Jae-hyeong (김재형), set in the era of Goguryeo.

=== 1970s ===
As television sets started to be rolled out en masse, the number of television series also grew. Just like in cinema, however, the policies of the ruling regime affected them as well. Thus dramatic historical figures were replaced by national heroes like general Yi Sun-sin or Sejong the Great. Sageuk of the time mixed legends and reality, the major cause of which was the enormous demand for TV series. Historical factual accuracy would have required scriptwriters to research historical documents written in hanja characters, which, considering the demand and the daily episodes, would have been impossible. Also, legends were easier to be dramatized.

As television dominated, cinema declined, and out of all the historic films of the period only two could achieve success at the box office: Lee Gyu-ung's Seongung Yi Sun-sin (성웅 이순신) and yet another Chunhyangga adaptation, this time by Lee Seong-gu. Critics applauded other works, like Gate of Woman (홍살문, Hongsalmun, 1972), An Executioner (망나니, Mangnani, 1974), Concentration of Attention (집념, Jibnyeom, 1976) or A War Diary (난중일기, Nanjungilgi, 1977).

=== 1980s ===
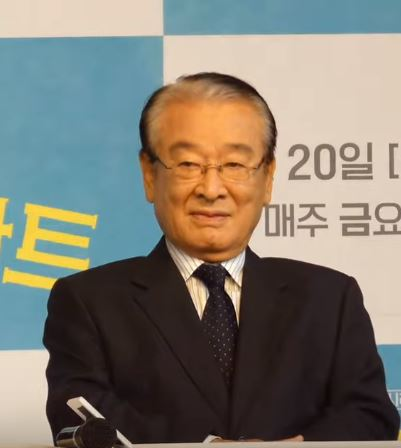
Lee Soon-jae, who played several historic figures since 1970s, such as Heungseon Daewongun (1982), Yoo Ui-tae (1991, 1999), Yi Hwang (2004), King Yeongjo (2007) & General Kim Jong-seo (2011)

The characteristic classic sageuk TV series of the 1980s was Joseonwangjo 500 nyeon (조선왕조500년, '500 Years of Joseon'), which ran for eight years, airing 11 separate TV series with over 800 episodes altogether, depicting the history of Joseon. The series referenced official historical documents (albeit liberally to some extent) and often included debated events and themes. It was directed by Lee Byung-hoon, who later also helmed the popular hallyu series Dae Jang Geum. The state channel KBS aired Gaeguk (개국, 'Foundation of the Kingdom') which depicted King Taejo's usurpation of the Goryeo throne in an overtly positive light, reminiscent of Chun Doo-hwan's rise in politics.

The diverse programming on television devoured viewers from attending cinemas, and the film industry had but one way out: show a genre that could not be accessed through television. This is why they turned to making erotic films, a good portion of which were set in historical times. Movies like Eoudong (1985) or Does the Cuckoo Cry at Night (뻐꾸기도 밤에 우는가, Bbakkugido bame unenga, 1985) were also popular at the box office. Although erotic movies were popular, the sageuk genre saw a decline in South Korean cinema generally.

=== 1990s ===
At the beginning of the 1990s, historical films were scarce, except for Bae Chang-ho's Kkum (꿈, 'Dream'; 1990). The Eternal Empire (영원한 제국), which was highly acclaimed by critics, was released in 1995. The film is significant for its different take on the popular story of Crown Prince Sado, focusing on the political aftermath of his death, rather than the pain of the prince himself. Although it did not do well at the box office, the film received eight awards at the Grand Bell Awards, including Best Film and Best Director. Im Kwon-taek's period films are also noteworthy, as well as The Legend of Gingko from 1996.

The 1990s saw a number of sageuk on television, like Han Myeong-hui (한명회, 1994), Jang Nok-su (장녹수, 1995), Tears of the Dragon (용의 눈물, 1996–1998) or King of the Wind (대왕의 길, 1998). However, viewership ratings could not match up to that of contemporary Korean dramas, only a few could reach 30%, while for example the modern themed Eyes of Dawn recorded 58.3%, Sandglass broke 50.8%.

=== Since 2000 ===
At the beginning of the 2000s, sageuk were preferred by older generations. Young people chose to watch contemporary series, which they could better relate to. Sageuk were often complicated, archaic in language use, and mainly employed older actors — thus were less appealing to younger generations. A change in attitude is attributed to producer and director Lee Byung-hoon, who entrusted the script of Hur Jun to a young, up-and-coming scriptwriter, Choi Wan-gyu. Instead of dry historical facts and distant wars, the series focused on emotions and relationships, revolving around the legendary Joseon royal physician. A new genre, "fusion sageuk" was born, changing the structure and format of Korean historical television series. In 2003, actress Ha Ji-won starred in Damo, the first HDTV format Korean TV series. The drama merged characteristics of trendy modern dramas with Hong Kong style wire-fu action scenes, narrating a fictional story set in a real historical time.

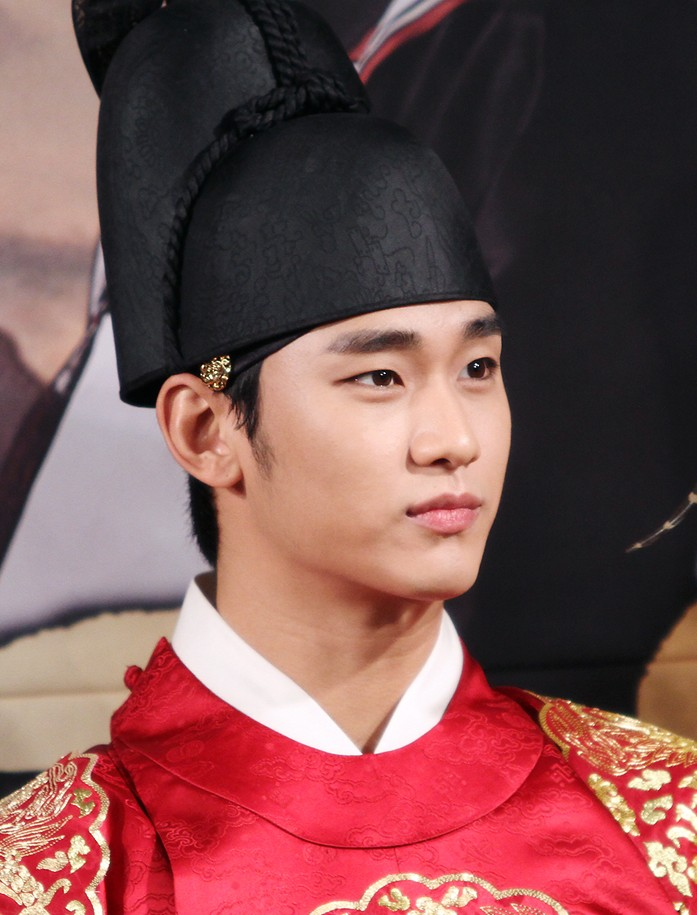
Kim Soo-hyun in costume for fantasy sageuk Moon Embracing the Sun (2012)

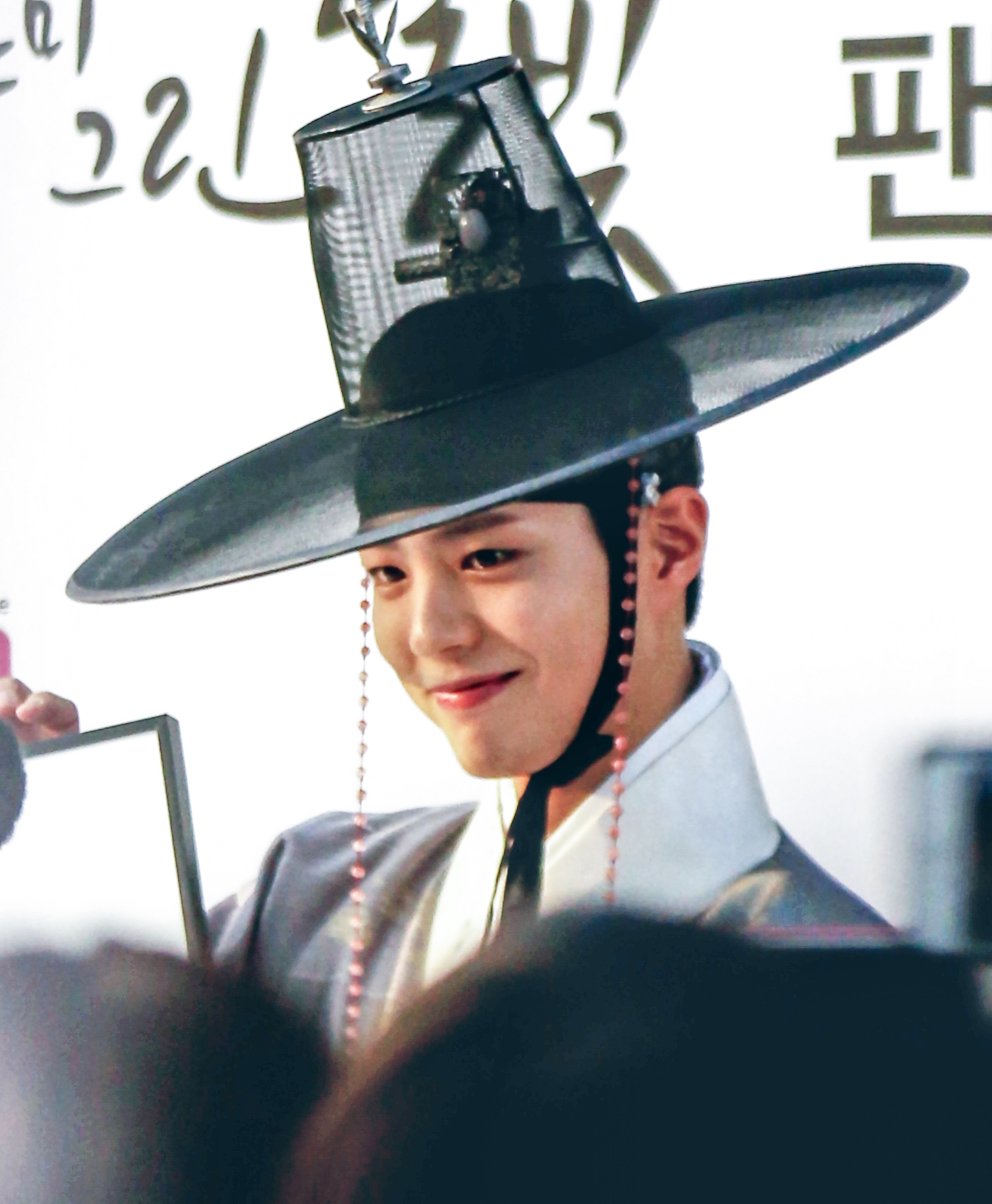
Park Bo-gum in costume for youth, fusion sageuk Love in the Moonlight (2016)

As fusion sageuk conquered televisions, they started to infiltrate cinema, as well. This can be attributed partially to the success of television dramas and partially to the international success of such Chinese historical epics like Crouching Tiger, Hidden Dragon, Hero or the American Gladiator, prompting the need to produce such works at home, as well. In 2003, Untold Scandal with drama icon Bae Yong-joon was released, but the real turning point in historical films came in 2005 with The King and the Clown, breaking box office records selling more than 12 million tickets. Period films are also successful in the 2010s in South Korea, between 2012 and 2015, five out of all the films surpassing 10 million viewers were sageuk, and the record holder (as of 2016 June) is also a historical piece: The Admiral: Roaring Currents sold 17.61 million tickets. The most popular ones are also of the fusion type, mixing historical facts with fictional people or events. Such works include for example, The Face Reader or Masquerade. Apart from so-called palace dramas, spectacular action-filled sageuk like War of the Arrows, The Grand Heist or Pirates are also successful in the 21st century. Film series have also appeared, like the Detective K-series, placing a crime investigation story into Joseon settings. Erotic period films experience a renaissance in South Korean cinema, with pieces like Forbidden Quest, The Servant or Empire of Lust. In 2026, The King's Warden, directed by Jang Hang-jun and depicting the exile of the deposed King Danjong, became the first Korean film in two years to surpass 10 million admissions, about a month after its release on 4 February. By late March it had drawn more than 14.7 million admissions, the third-highest total for a Korean film.

Sungkyunkwan Scandal (2010), Moon Embracing the Sun (2012) and Love in the Moonlight (2016) were all sageuk adapted from popular novels. They were initially targeted to a younger demographic but have since achieved mainstream and international success. The productions have also put the spotlight to then emerging actors Song Joong-ki, Yoo Ah-in, Kim Soo-hyun, Park Bo-gum and Kim Yoo-jung.

Large-scale sageuk have been rarely produced, but when they were launched, they often caught the attention of the public. Most of them have been fantasy-based, telling the audience a unique story of kings and queens who lived in the ancient era. The most well-known one so far has been The Legend (2007), which featured the Hallyu star Bae Yong-joon. In 2018, Studio Dragon announced it was working on Arthdal Chronicles, a new fantasy sageuk casting Song Joong-ki and Kim Ji-won. The series premiered on tvN on 1 June 2019.

On March 5, 2017, Netflix announced a series order for Kingdom, a Joseon-set series combining sageuk with zombie horror. Alongside the series announcement, it was confirmed that Kim Seong-hun would direct the series and that Kim Eun-hee would be credited as the writer. The series was produced by AStory.

== Popular themes ==
Popular themes include the following:

- Elements of Korean folklore: pansori tales like Chunhyangga; folk tales like Prince Hodong and the Princess of Nakrang; mythological creatures like gumihos
- Three Kingdoms of Korea
- North–South States Period
- Goryeo kings, especially those with dramatic life stories, like King Taejo (Wang Kŏn), King Gwangjong (Wang So), King Gongmin (Wang Chŏn) and King Gongyang (Wang Yo)
- Joseon princes and kings, especially those with dramatic life stories, like King Taejo (Yi Sŏnggye), King Taejong (Yi Pangwŏn), King Sejong the Great (Yi To), King Sejo (Yi Yu), King Yeonsan (Yi Yung), King Gwanghae (Yi Hon), Crown Prince Sado (Yi Sŏn), King Jeongjo (Yi San), Heungseon Daewongun (Yi Ha-ŭng), and Emperor Gojong (Yi Myŏng-bok)
- Famous women, like Hwang Jini, Jang Hui-bin, Jang Nok-su, Queen Munjeong, Shin Saimdang, Jang-geum, Empress Myeongseong and Queen Seondeok
- Famous scholars, like Chŏng Mong-ju, Chŏng Tojŏn, Sin Sukchu, Hwang Hŭi, Cho Kwangjo, Yi Hwang, Yi I, Yu Sŏngnyong and Chŏng Yagyong
- Famous soldiers, like Ch'oe Yŏng and Yi Sun-sin
- Cross-dressing heroines

== See also ==
- Historical drama
- Taiga drama
