= Lee Geum-hee =

South Korean broadcaster (born 1966)

- 이금희
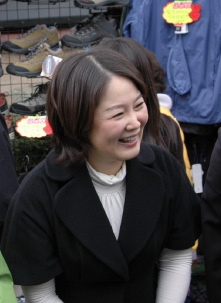
- Lee in 2010
- Born: December 12, 1966 (age 59); Bulgwang-dong, Eunpyeong-gu, Seoul
- Education: Bulgwang Elementary School; Dongmyeong Girls' High School (Graduated in 1984); Sookmyung Women's University; Yonsei University Master of Journalism, Graduate School of Media and Public Relations
- Occupation: Broadcaster
- Years active: 1989–present
- Notable work: KBS Morning Courtyard

Korean name
- Hangul: 이금희
- Hanja: 李錦姬
- RR: I Geumhui
- MR: I Kŭmhŭi

Lee Geum-hee (Korean: 이금희; born on December 12, 1966, in Seoul, South Korea) is a South Korean radio presenter, television announcer, television personality, and voice actress. She became known as a KBS announcer, hosting programs such as 6 o'clock My Hometown, Love Request, and Power Interview. She notably hosted KBS Morning Garden for 18 years and the narrator of Human Theatre for approximately 10 years. She was known as one of the nation's top broadcasting talents and recognized by public with the title of "Nation's Announcer".

Since 2007, Lee has been hosting KBS Cool FM's It's Lee Geum-hee, a Good Day to Love and manages her YouTube channel, My Geum-hee. Her television appearances include the 2022 show Stopping on the Road Once in a While. Additionally, she has been an Sookmyung Women's University, since 1999, teaching speaking classes. She is the author of two books, I Don't Want to Stand Out and the bestseller We, Speak Comfortably, published in October 2022.

== Early years and education ==
Lee Geum-hee was born on December 11, 1966, in Bulgwang-dong, Eunpyeong-gu, Seoul. The fourth of five daughters, her father worked as a police officer. Due to the family's financial difficulties as her father was a low-level government official, her mother supported the family by working as a hairdresser and tailor.

In her early years, Lee faced significant health challenges; doctors initially doubted she would survive past the age of three. However, her mother, who had previously lost a child, dedicated herself to Lee's care, allowing her to grow up in good health. Financial constraints prevented Lee's parents from affording kindergarten, leading to her enrolling in Bulgwang Elementary School at the age of five. Despite the initial concerns about her health, her mother found comfort in seeing Lee thrive and attend school.

Lee's mother was a supportive listener, which encouraged Lee to share the details of her day. This habit helped her develop strong speaking skills and attentive listening abilities. In the fifth grade, (Note: In other interviews it was reported that it was in fourth grade.) of elementary school, Lee attended the KBS show ''Who is Better at Who?'' a nursery rhyme contest program, with her friends. She was captivated by the female host, an experience that inspired her to pursue a career as an announcer. During her time at Dongmyeong Girls' High School, Lee actively participated in broadcasting activities.

She graduated from high school in 1984. When selecting a university, Lee specifically sought a campus with a broadcasting station. She enrolled i Sookmyung Women's University where she studied Political Science, graduating in 1988.

== Career ==
=== 1987–1999: Broadcasting career at KBS ===
In 1987, during her senior year, Lee participated in the announcer recruitment exams for both KBS and MBC, but was eliminated in the final interview stage. Undeterred, she worked briefly as a radio reporter through a special hiring program for individuals who did not pass the final interview, where she met announcer Jung Eun-ah. After approximately four months, she resigned and also worked briefly as a secretary, dedicating her off-hours to preparing for the announcer exam. In February 1989, Lee successfully joined KBS announcer public recruitment and she finally was recruited. after passing the 16th announcer public recruitment. Her first program at the station was the radio show On the Wings of Song. She subsequently hosted the KBS Creative Children's Song Contest, which succeeded Who is Better at Who? the program that had originally inspired her to become an announcer.

In 1991, despite being described by the announcer director as "old-fashioned" compared to her more contemporary peers, this distinct quality led to her selection as the host of 6 o'clock My Hometown. Lee viewed this as an opportunity for professional development, even writing an essay titled 'Clumsy Announcer,' which was later published in a middle school Korean textbook. Lee gained wider public recognition starting in June 1998 as the host of KBS Morning Garden. Her quiet demeanor and two-handed microphone grip became characteristic of her broadcasts. She continued in this role for 18 years, conducting interviews with an estimated 23,500 individuals, until the program's sudden cancellation on June 30, 2016. As the host, Lee conducted interviews with 23,500 individuals.

Announcer Lee Geum-hee, while hosting the broadcast, never puts herself in the spotlight. Yet, she possesses a special charm that prevents one person from overshadowing another, all while maintaining a gentle and smooth flow.

— Professor Kim Jung-ran from Sangji University,

While working as an announcer, Lee earned a master's degree in Journalism from the Graduate School of Media and Public Relations at Yonsei University in 1999. Her thesis was titled "A Study on Facilitator Preferences According to the Genre of Television Programs."

=== 2000–present: Career as freelancer ===
In 2000, after 11 years and 8 months at KBS, resigned from her staff position to work as a freelancer. She maintained her connection with KBS, continuing to host existing programs like the radio show Lee Geum-hee's Song Walk and the television program KBS Morning Garden. This decision followed a transitional period in 1999, during which she was promoted to Deputy General Manager of the announcer's office at KBS. After completing her master's degree, Lee also became an adjunct professor, teaching speaking classes at her alma mater, Sookmyung Women's University, and mentoring students. During this time, the pressure of writing her graduate thesis and a book led to health issues, including fainting episodes due to low blood pressure, prompting her decision to resign from her full-time role.

After transitioning to freelance work, her workload increased significantly. She took on administrative tasks previously handled by the Deputy General Manager of the announcer's office, including managing inquiries about her resignation and handling requests for coverage from reporters. For a period, she worked exclusively with KBS. One of her notable roles during this time was narrating the human documentary series Human Theatre, captivating viewers with her storytelling for five years. Lee described Human Theatre as a "living textbook," where she found deep immersion in the stories, often experiencing profound emotional reactions. In addition to Human Theatre, Lee began hosting TV Fairy Tale Happy World" on Korea Broadcasting 1 Television in April 2001. As a freelancer, she continued to be a popular presenter across various KBS programs, including Morning Garden, Lee Geum-hee's Music Stroll, Human Theatre, and TV Fairy Tale Happy World.

In 2005, Lee was selected as the host of Power Interview on KBS1TV, an interview program airing Saturdays at 11 p.m. This revamped show, previously hosted by actress Shim Hye-jin, featured in-depth interviews with influential figures from diverse fields to convey their philosophies and visions. The new format, which began airing on November 5, aimed to enhance expertise with revamped panelists including Jin Jung-kwon, Oh Ji-hye, Professor Chae Jung-ho, and Nancy Lang.

On May 22, 2006, Lee became master of ceremony of Sookmyung Women's University's 100th Anniversary. Sookmyung Women's University held a commemorative ceremony on the campus at Renaissance Plaza outdoor stage with more than 1,000 people in attendance, including former Prime Minister Goh Kun, Ewha Womans University President Shin In-ryeong, Korea University President Eo Yun-dae, and 32 delegations of presidents from 18 universities in 10 countries.

In 2007, she became the host of the radio show It's Lee Geum-hee, a Good Day to Love on KBS Cool FM, airing daily at 6:00 p.m. local time, with Kim Hye-soo as the first broadcast's guest.

Lee also expanded into acting, making a cameo appearance in the 2009 film Take-off alongside announcer Son Bum-soo, portraying an MC in a program where the main character Cha Heon-tae (played by Ha Jung-woo) searches for his mother. She also made special appearances and worked as a voice actress in films such as Top Star, My Father, and Cracked Eggs and Noodles.

In 2010, her talk show, Lee Geum-hee's Special Encounter, premiered on December 10 on KBS Prime. This program invited prominent figures to delve into their stories of success, love, and life, marking Lee's first solo-hosted talk show since Power Interview in 2005.

In 2016, Lee's unexpected departure from KBS Morning Garden after 18 years, where she had hosted since 1998, caused public regret. Her stepping down was attributed to KBS's internal policy of prioritizing internal personnel over external staff, a decision reportedly influenced by market competition. Despite her long tenure and lack of controversy, her departure surprised co-hosts and viewers, leading to public disappointment and criticism of KBS's decision.

On September 10, 2021, Lee received the Narrator Award at the 48th Korea Broadcasting Prizes, hosted by the Korea Broadcasters Association, for her work on EBS's Travel to Korea. She joined the living field documentary program, which explores South Korea's hidden landscapes, as a narrator in 2009.

On March 25, 2022, the Korean Society of Laryngeal Speech and Speech Medicine honored Lee by selecting her as the recipient of the title for the person with the most beautiful voice and appointing her as an honorary ambassador. Following this, she delivered a lecture on "Beautiful Voices and Our Stories". Lee also participated in the 957th episode of the quiz show Conflict in Korean.

== Philanthropy ==
Lee is actively involved in various charitable causes, notably donating ten percent of her income consistently and supporting children with disabilities overseas. In 2003, Lee was appointed as a director of the Open World National Cultural Movement, an organization focused on people with disabilities, where she worked to promote awareness.

Lee frequently utilizes her voice for narration projects that create a positive social impact. In April 2013, she provided narration for the KBS 3 Radio special live broadcast "Sound, Sight, and Touch," held in honor of the "International Day of Disabled Persons" (April 20). The event took place at the KBS New Building Auditorium in Yeouido-dong, Yeongdeungpo-gu, Seoul, and was attended by approximately 250 invited individuals with disabilities and their families.

In 2020, Lee participated as a narrator in a fundraising campaign organized by the Hope Bridge National Disaster Relief Association to assist neighbors affected by disasters. The video, released on June 1, highlighted how people gathered at Hope Bridge to overcome significant disasters in Korea, including the COVID-19 pandemic, the Pohang earthquake, and various typhoon damages. On May 10, 2021, the Purme Foundation announced that Lee had allocated proceeds from an auction held during a YouTube live event to support rehabilitation treatment for children with disabilities.

Furthermore, on November 11, 2022 (Farmer's Day), Lee collaborated with Professor Suh Kyung-deok of Sungshin Women's University to release "Bee's Gift," a multilingual video (Korean and English). The video aimed to raise awareness about the value of urban beekeeping and advocate for the preservation and restoration of the honey bee ecosystem.

== Filmography ==
=== Radio ===
Off-Air On-Air

Radio broadcasts of Lee Geum-hee
Year	Title		Role	Network	Ref.
Year	English	Korean	Role	Network	Ref.
1991–1993	On the Wings of KBS Radio Song	KBS 라디오 노래의 날개위에	Presenter	KBS Classic FM	
1993	KBS Radio FM Home Music	KBS 라디오 FM가정음악	Presenter	KBS Classic FM	
1997–1998	Lee Geum-hee's Studio 891	이금희의 스튜디오 891	Presenter	KBS Cool FM	November 3, 1997 – October 11, 1998
1998–2007	Lee Geum-hee's Song Walk	이금희의 가요산책	Presenter	KBS Cool FM	October 12, 1998, to April 15, 2007
2007–present	Lee Geum-hee, It's a Good Day to Love	사랑하기 좋은날 이금희입니다	Presenter	KBS Cool FM	April 16, 2007, to Present
2010–present	To the Forest of Music with Lee Geum-hee	이금희와 함께 음악의 숲을	Presenter	Gugak Broadcasting	
2014–2019	Multicultural Music Trip	다문화 음악여행	Presenter	EBS Radio	

=== Television program ===
Off-Air On-Air

Year	Title		Role	Notes	Ref.
Year	English	Korean	Role	Notes	Ref.
1990	KBS Creative Children's Song Contest	KBS 창작동요대회	Announcer	October 12, 1990	
1991–1994	''6 o'clock My Hometown''	KBS 6시 내고향	Announcer	May 20, 1991, to October 7, 1994	
1996–1998	''Family Entertainment Centre''	가족오락관	Guest		
1998–1999	''Love Request''	사랑의 리퀘스트	Announcer	1998 to 1999	
1996–1997	TV is Loaded with Love	TV는 사랑을 싣고	Announcer	October 18, 1996, to February 28, 1997	
1997–2000	TV is Loaded with Love	TV는 사랑을 싣고	Announcer	May 1997 to April 28, 2000	
2001–2002	''Korean Traditional Music Festival''	국악한마당	Announcer	November 18, 2001, to January 6, 2002	
1998–2016	''Morning Garden''	아침마당	Announcer	June 15, 1998, to June 30, 2016	
2000–2016	''Human Theatre''	인간극장	Narrator	May 1, 2000 - June 19, 2009	
2001–2013	TV Fairy Tale Happy World	TV동화 행복한 세상	Announcer		
2002–2003	SBS Live Today	SBS 생방송 투데이	Announcer		
2005	MBC Power Quiz	퀴즈의 힘	Host	January 29, 2005, to April 16, 2005	
2005–2006	''Power Interview''	파워인터뷰	Host		
2009	New Year's Special 2–Part 'SBS Special'	신년특집 2부작 'SBS스페셜'	Host		
2009–present	Travel to Korea	한국기행	Narrator		
2010–2011	Lee Geum-hee's Special Encounter	이금희의 특별한 만남	Talk Show Host		
2011	KBS Special Project Social Capital	KBS 특별기획 사회적 자본	Narrator		
2016–2017	''Documentary Empathy''	다큐공감	Narrator	Episode 153: Mom's Hand (May 29, 2016j); Episode 157: Flower Grand Flower in My Neighbourhood (July 3, 2016); Episode 160: Saving the Paradise Shopping, the Concert of My Life (July 24, 2016); Episode 189: Korean Education in Harlem, Making Miracles (March 4, 2017); Episode 301: Honey, I Love You (June 2, 2019)	
2017	SBS Feature Documentary	특집 다큐멘터리	Narrator	Episode 500: Network Specialties Greenway Revives the City	
2017	KBS Special: Danish political festival records 'co-op' for 5 days	KBS 스페셜	Narrator	July 6, 2017	
2021	Bride X Game	브라이드x클럽	Panelist	Pilot Episodes	
2021–2022	Documentary On	다큐On	Narrator	Episode 112: Old age, take a book》 (November 26, 2021); Episode 141: Treasure Island Uninhabited Island (May 27, 2022); Episode 152 : We go to the island. The active island project. (August 12, 2022)	
2022	''Stopping on the Road Once in a While''	한 번쯤 멈출 수 밖에	Main Cast		
2022–present	''Animal Theatre Best Friend''	동물극장 단짝	Narrator		
2023	Somehow Adult	어쩌다 어른	Main Cast	tvN	

=== Web show ===
Year	Title		Role	Notes	Ref.
Year	English	Korean	Role	Notes	Ref.
2020	Lee Geum-hee 'My Geum-hee'	이금희 '마이 금희'	Host	YouTube Channel	
2021	Rough Field	거침마당	Host with Park Myung-soo	Kakao TV Original	
2022	Join My Table	조인 마이 테이블	Host with Park Sang-young	Watcha Original	

=== Film ===
Year	Title		Role	Notes	Ref.
Year	English	Korean	Role	Notes	Ref.
2001	I Wish I Had a Wife	나도 아내가 있었으면 좋겠다	Weather Forecast Unit' Voice	Voice appearance	
2002	Home...	집으로...	Voice appearance	Voice appearance	
2002	Sympathy for Mr. Vengeance	복수는 나의 것	Radio DJ	Special appearance	
2005	Cracked Eggs and Noodles	파송송 계란탁	Broadcast narration voice actor	Special appearance (voice)	
2005	Long and Winding Road	엄마	Voice appearance	Special appearance (voice)	
2005	The Emperor's Journey (La Marche de l'empereur)	펭귄 - 위대한 모험	Narrator	Documentary	
2006	Now and Forever	연리지	DJ role	Special appearance	
2007	My Father	마이 파더	Narrator	Special appearance	
2007	Fish on Land	지상의 물고기들	Narrator	Documentary	
2009	There is a lot when you go there	그 곳에 가면 제비가 있다	Narrator	Short Documentary	
2009	Take Off	국가대표	Announcer Lee Keum-hee	Special appearance	
2010	Don't Cry for Me Sudan	울지마 톤즈 1: 슈크란 바바	Narrator	Documentary	
2013	Top Star	톱스타	Host of Today's Critics Awards	Special appearance	
2019	Kim Dae-jung's conscience in action	행동하는 양심 김대중	Narrator	Documentary	
2020	Don't Cry for Me Sudan 2	울지마 톤즈 2: 슈크란 바바	Narrator	Documentary	
2021	Like a lion not startled by a sound	소리에 놀라지 않는 사자처럼	Narrator	Documentary	
2023	Aerial Documentary 'Korea's River'	항공 다큐멘터리 '한국의 강'	Narrator	Documentary	

=== Television series ===
Year	Title		Role	Notes	Ref.
Year	English	Korean	Role	Notes	Ref.
2004	Oh Feel Young	오! 필승 봉순영	Narration	KBS2	
2004	I'm Sorry, I Love You	미안하다, 사랑한다	Broadcast Host	Special appearance	
2009	Boys Over Flowers	꽃보다 남자	Broadcast Host	Special appearance (Ep. 25)	
2009	The Slingshot	남자 이야기	Broadcast Host	Special appearance	
2012	My Husband Got a Family	넝쿨째 굴러온 당신	Broadcast Host	Special appearance	
2018	Misty	미스티	Broadcast Host	Special appearance	

== Bibliography ==
Non-fiction Books by Lee
Year	Title		Publisher	Published Date	ISBN	Ref.
Year	English	Korean	Publisher	Published Date	ISBN	Ref.
1999	I Don't Want to Stand Out	나는 튀고 싶지 않다	Samter (Samtersa)	1999-06-04	9788946412880	
2022	Let's talk comfortably	우리, 편하게 말해요	Woongjin Jiji House	2022-10-21	9788901264776	

== Accolades ==
=== Awards and nominations ===
Year presented, name of the award ceremony, award category, nominated work and the result of the nomination
Year	Award	Category	Nominated work	Result	Ref.
1998	25th Korea Broadcasting Prizes	Female Announcer Award	Morning Garden	Won	
2000	13th Christian Culture Awards	Culture Awards	Lee Geum-hee	Won	
2001	4th Blue Media Award hosted by the Korean Women's Association (Note: Established in 1998, Purun Media Award has been created to encourage producers who strive to create good programs amidst the wave of commercialization, and to reconsider the necessity and role of terrestrial broadcasting. In addition, this award serves to encourage producers who have steadfastly defended their convictions by fulfilling their responsibilities and duties as broadcast producers, and to re-aware the necessity of terrestrial broadcasting as a public role. This award was reflected in the broadcasting evaluation system, providing an opportunity for broadcasters to produce better programs, and since 2006, producers of local terrestrial broadcasters with poor production environments have been given the opportunity to win the award, giving individual producers pride in their work. and produced achievements to be proud of. Above all, Purun Media Award is an award given directly by viewers, so it has a greater meaning for producers.)	Language Award	Lee Geum-hee	Won	
2007	20th Korea Broadcasting Producer Award	TV Host of the Year Award	Lee Geum-hee	Won	
2019	KBS Entertainment Awards	DJ of the Year Award	Lee Geum-hee, a good day to love	Won	
2021	48th Korea Broadcasting Awards	Voice actor/Narration Award	EBS Travel to Korea	Won	

=== State honors ===
Name of country, award ceremony, year given, and name of honor
Country	Award Ceremony	Year	Honor	Ref.
South Korea	The 38th Savings Day Event (Note: "Savings Day" (Jeochug-ui Nal) is a commemorative day established in 1964 to promote a savings culture among South Korean citizens. In 1973, it was integrated with other commemorative days, such as "Securities Day" and "Insurance Day", during the consolidation of various commemorative days. When it was first established in 1964, the designated date for Savings Day was September 21. It was then changed twice, first to September 25 in 1966, and then to October 25 in 1973. Finally, in 1984, it was designated as the "last Tuesday of October", which brings us to the present day.)	2001	Prime Minister's Commendation	

=== Listicles ===
Name of publisher, year listed, name of listicle, and placement
Publisher	Year	List	Placement	Ref.
Bomon Announcer Academy	2006	The Best Role Model for Announcers	1st	
The Brand 38 Institute	2008	Stars Most Preferred by Viewers as TV Commercial Models	133rd	
KBS	2023	50 People Who Made KBS Shine	39th	
