= Priest (TV series) =

2018 South Korean television series

- Promotional poster
- Hangul: 프리스트
- RR: Peuriseuteu
- MR: P'ŭrisŭt'ŭ
- Genre: Medical drama; Thriller
- Created by: Studio Dragon
- Written by: Moon Man-sae
- Directed by: Kim Jong-hyeon
- Starring: Yeon Woo-jin; Jeong Yu-mi; Park Yong-woo
- Country of origin: South Korea
- Original language: Korean
- No. of episodes: 16

Production
- Executive producer: Kim Dong-hyun
- Camera setup: Single-camera
- Running time: 60 minutes
- Production company: Crave Works

Original release
- Network: OCN
- Release: November 24, 2018 – January 20, 2019

Priest (Korean: 프리스트) is a 2018 South Korean television series starring Yeon Woo-jin, Jeong Yu-mi and Park Yong-woo. It aired on OCN from November 24, 2018 to January 20, 2019 every Saturday and Sunday at 22:20 (KST).

== Synopsis ==
A story about doctors and exorcists protecting people together at a Catholic hospital in Seoul.

== Cast ==
=== Main ===
- Yeon Woo-jin as Oh Soo-min

A dutiful and reckless Catholic priest who is a member of 634 Regia. Twenty years prior to the series, Soo-min and his father, along with priest Moon Ki-seon, witnessed the death of his mother at a young age, where she was possessed and killed by a demon due to his father's refusal to believe in exorcism preventing her from receiving one. Under priest Moon's tutelage, he becomes an exorcist.

- Jeong Yu-mi as Ham Eun-ho

A doctor at Southern Catholic Hospital who lost her faith in God at a young age when her parents died in front of her in an accident, she first encountered Soo-min when her most recent patient turns out to be possessed by an evil entity. Witnessing the exorcisms of both the patient and the subsequent possession of a colleague by the same entity caused her to rethink her beliefs.

- Park Yong-woo as Moon Ki-seon

A senior Catholic priest who founded 634 Regia, a group of priests that performs exorcisms unofficially while still recognized by the Vatican. When he was younger, he was called upon by Soo-min to save his mother but was too late. He was the one who takes Soo-min under his wing and taught him how to conduct exorcisms.

=== Supporting ===
- Son Jong-hak as Koo Do-hyun
- Oh Yeon-ah as Shin Mi-yeon
- Yu Bee as Jung Yong-pil
- Lee Gun-myung as Lee Ki-hong
- Lee Eun-saem as Chae Yi-soo
- Jang Won-hyung as Jang Won-seok
- Cha Min-ji as Jang Kyung-ran
- Moon Sook as Go Mi-sook
- Kang Kyung-hun as Cha Sun-young
- Jang Hee-ryung as Kim Yoo-ri

== Production ==
Priest reunites Yeon Woo-jin and Jeong Yu-mi who previously starred together in The Tunnel (2014).

The lead male role was first offered to Lee Je-hoon but he declined.

== Original soundtrack ==
Priest OST

Soundtrack album by Various artists
- Recorded: 2018
- Genre: Soundtrack
- Languages: Korean; English
- Labels: Genie Music; Stone Music Entertainment

=== Part 1 ===
Released on December 15, 2018
No.	Title	Lyrics	Music	Artist	Length
1.	"Wake Me"	Jeong Gu-hyeon	Jeong Gu-hyeon	NieN (feat. Choi Sung-wook)	3:41
2.	"Wake Me" (Inst.)		Jeong Gu-hyeon		3:41
Total length:					7:22

=== Part 2 ===
Released on January 5, 2019
No.	Title	Lyrics	Music	Artist	Length
1.	"Light Me"	Park Geun-cheol; RUNY	Lee Dong-jun; Jeong Gu-hyeon	Lee Ye-joon	4:07
2.	"Light Me" (Inst.)		Lee Dong-jun; Jeong Gu-hyeon		4:07
Total length:					8:14

== Ratings ==
Priest : South Korea viewers per episode (thousands)

Season	Episode number																Average
Season	1	2	3	4	5	6	7	8	9	10	11	12	13	14	15	16	Average
1	424	676	584	698	488	648	486	476	366	TBD	TBD	519	395	599	408	533	TBD

Source: Audience measurement performed nationwide by Nielsen Media Research.

Average TV viewership ratings
Ep.	Original broadcast date	Average audience share	
Ep.	Original broadcast date	AGB Nielsen	
Ep.	Original broadcast date	Nationwide	Seoul
1	November 24, 2018	1.862%	2.237%
2	November 25, 2018	2.487%	3.220%
3	December 1, 2018	2.019%	2.178%
4	December 2, 2018	2.411%	3.046%
5	December 8, 2018	1.889%	2.308%
6	December 9, 2018	2.278%	3.011%
7	December 15, 2018	1.726%	1.927%
8	December 16, 2018	2.003%	2.619%
9	December 22, 2018	1.416%	2.038%
10	December 23, 2018	1.902%	2.479%
11	January 5, 2019	1.362%	1.654%
12	January 6, 2019	1.876%	2.754%
13	January 12, 2019	1.637%	2.270%
14	January 13, 2019	2.244%	3.085%
15	January 19, 2019	1.413%	1.633%
16	January 20, 2019	2.072%	2.697%
Average		1.912%	2.447%
In the table above, the blue numbers represent the lowest ratings and the red numbers represent the highest ratings.; This drama aired on a cable channel/pay TV which normally has a relatively smaller audience compared to free-to-air TV/public broadcasters (KBS, SBS, MBC and EBS).
