= Jeong Yu-mi =

- Hangul: 정유미
- RR: Jeong Yumi
- MR: Chŏng Yumi

Jeong Yu-mi may refer to:

- Jung Yu-mi (actress, born 1983)
- Jeong Yu-mi (actress, born 1984)
