= Stephanie Lee =

American and South Korean actress (born 1993)

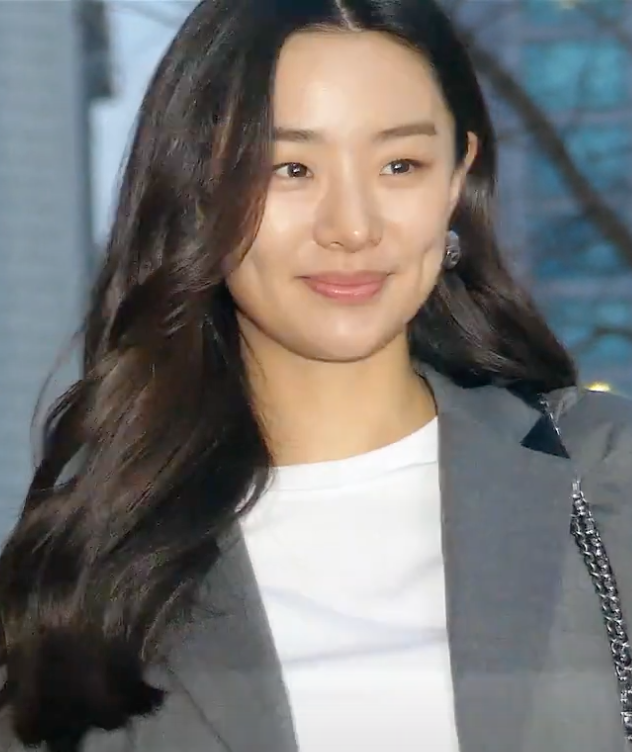
- Lee in February 2019
- Born: September 14, 1993 (age 32); Grand Rapids, Michigan, U.S.
- Other names: Lee Jeong-ah
- Citizenship: United States; South Korea
- Occupations: Actress; model
- Years active: 2008–present
- Agent: KeyEast
- Height: 177 cm (5 ft 10 in)

Korean name
- Hangul: 이정아
- Hanja: 李政娥
- RR: I Jeonga
- MR: I Chŏnga

Stephanie Lee (Korean: 스테파니 리; born September 14, 1993) is an American and South Korean actress and model. She has starred in the Korean television series Schoolgirl Detectives (2014), Partners for Justice (2018) and Start-Up (2020).

== Filmography ==
=== Film ===
Year	Title	Role	Ref.
2018	The Great Battle	Dal-rae	
2019	The Divine Move 2: The Wrathful	Hwang Sun-hee	
2025	Homeward Bound	Jenny	
2025	Incarnation	Thalia	

=== Television series ===
Year	Title	Role	Ref.
2014	Schoolgirl Detectives	Choi Sung-yoon	
2015	Yong-pal	Cynthia Park	
2016	Second to Last Love	Min Ji-sun	
2018	Partners for Justice	Stella Hwang	
2018	The Last Empress	Oh Hel-ro	
2020	When I Was the Most Beautiful	Amber	
2020	Start-Up	Jung Sa-ha	

=== Television shows ===
Year	Title	Role	Ref.
2015	Stephanie Lee's Colorful Life	Host	
2015	Taste of Others		
2015	Stargram		
2020	High School Style Icon 2	Judge	
2021	Top Seller	Judge	

=== Music video appearances ===
Year	Song title	Artist	Ref.
2013	"Comeback When You Hear This Song"	2PM	

=== Hosting ===
Year	Title	Notes	Ref.
2015	10th Asia Model Awards	With Kang Seung-hyun, Shin Hyun-joon	
2016	20th Bucheon International Fantastic Film Festival	With Park Sung-woong	
2017	54th Grand Bell Awards	With Shin Hyun-joon	

== Awards and nominations ==
Name of the award ceremony, year presented, category, nominee of the award, and the result of the nomination
Award ceremony	Year	Category	Nominee / Work	Result	Ref.
Asia Model Awards	2013	CF Model Award	Stephanie Lee	Won	
CFDK Fashion Awards	2013	Model of the Year Award	Stephanie Lee	Won	
Korea Best Dresser Swan Award	2014	Best Dressed Female Model	Stephanie Lee	Won	
Korea Fashion Photographers Association Awards	2013	New Model Award	Stephanie Lee	Won	
