= Wonderful Mama =

2013 South Korean TV series

- Promotional poster
- Genre: Family; Comedy; Soap opera
- Written by: Park Hyun-joo
- Directed by: Yoon Ryu-hae
- Starring: Bae Jong-ok; Jeong Yu-mi; Kim Ji-seok; Park Bo-gum
- Country of origin: South Korea
- Original language: Korean
- No. of episodes: 48

Production
- Production locations: South Korea; Cebu, Philippines
- Running time: Saturdays and Sundays at 20:45 (KST)
- Production company: SBS Plus

Original release
- Network: Seoul Broadcasting System
- Release: 13 April – 22 September 2013

Wonderful Mama (Korean: 원더풀 마마) is a 2013 South Korean television series starring Bae Jong-ok with Jeong Yu-mi, Kim Ji-seok and Park Bo-gum. It premiered on April 13, 2013, and ended on September 22, 2013, airing on SBS every Saturday and Sunday at 20:40 for 48 episodes.

== Synopsis ==
Yoon Bok-hee has accomplished a lot in her life, working her way up from running a money-lending market stand to managing millions. But her priorities shift when she's faced with a diagnosis of early-onset Alzheimer's. Her degenerative disease threatens her ability to manage her business and eventually the details of her daily life.

After receiving her diagnosis, she realizes that her most important goal is helping her children to grow up in a hurry. She must teach them how to run the family business and they must also learn how to care for her when she can no longer care for herself. It won't be easy as they still have a lot of growing up to do.

== Cast ==
=== Main ===
- Bae Jong-ok as Yoon Bok-hee

A self-made woman who went from working a tiny market stand to becoming a successful loan shark who owns multi-million-won buildings. She is diagnosed with early-onset Alzheimer's disease.

- Jeong Yu-mi as Go Young-chae

Spoiled daughter of Bok-hee, she is a shopaholic and fashionista

- Kim Ji-seok as Go Young-soo

Bok-hee's son and Young-chae's twin brother, directionless with his career

- Park Bo-gum as Go Young-joon

Bok-hee's youngest child who is also a mama's boy, a playboy high-school student

=== Supporting ===
- Jung Gyu-woon as Jang Hoon-nam
- Ahn Nae-sang as Jang Ki-nam
- Kyeon Mi-ri as Kim Young-yi
- Lee Hwa-kyum (Note: Credited as Lee Yoo-young.) as Jang Go-eun
- Lee Min-woo as Lee Jang-ho
- Lee Chung-ah as Oh Da-jung
- Yoo In-young as Lee Soo-jin
- Kim Chung as Choi Eun-ok
- Yoon Joo-hee as Kim Nan-hee
- Hwang Jae-won as Lee Ji-woo
- Jung Kyung-ho as Sasa Kim
- Lee Kyung-shil as Jaegal Jeom-soon
- Heo Jung-eun as Kim Ha-pil
- Lee Suk-joon as Han Dong-soo
- Hwang Dong-joo as Hong Yoon-jae
- Shin Ji-soo as Hee-jin
- Yoon Ji-min as Han Se-ah

== Ratings ==
In the tables below, the blue numbers represent the lowest ratings and the red numbers represent the highest ratings.

| Episode # | Original broadcast date | Average audience share | | | |
| Episode # | Original broadcast date | TNmS Ratings | | AGB Nielsen | |
| Episode # | Original broadcast date | Nationwide | Seoul National Capital Area | Nationwide | Seoul National Capital Area |
|---|---|---|---|---|---|
| 1 | April 13 | 7.7% | 8.4% | 7.7% | 8.2% |
| 2 | April 14 | 7.6% | 8.5% | 8.0% | 8.3% |
| 3 | April 20 | 8.0% | 9.0% | 7.8% | 8.5% |
| 4 | April 21 | 7.8% | 8.2% | 8.5% | 8.8% |
| 5 | April 27 | 6.5% | 6.8% | 7.0% | 6.6% |
| 6 | April 28 | 6.5% | 7.0% | 7.4% | 7.8% |
| 7 | May 4 | 6.4% | 6.4% | 7.1% | 7.2% |
| 8 | May 5 | 6.3% | 6.6% | 7.4% | 8.2% |
| 9 | May 11 | 6.4% | 6.1% | 6.3% | 6.5% |
| 10 | May 12 | 7.0% | 6.9% | 7.1% | 8.4% |
| 11 | May 18 | 6.6% | 6.4% | 7.3% | 8.3% |
| 12 | May 19 | 7.0% | 7.5% | 7.5% | 8.7% |
| 13 | May 25 | 6.8% | 6.9% | 6.4% | 7.4% |
| 14 | May 26 | 7.0% | 7.2% | 7.5% | 7.8% |
| 15 | June 1 | 6.5% | 6.9% | 7.1% | 7.1% |
| 16 | June 2 | 6.6% | 7.2% | 6.2% | 6.8% |
| 17 | June 8 | 7.0% | 7.1% | 7.1% | 7.2% |
| 18 | June 9 | 6.2% | 6.9% | 6.0% | 6.6% |
| 19 | June 15 | 7.0% | 7.4% | 6.6% | 6.8% |
| 20 | June 16 | 5.5% | 5.7% | 6.4% | 7.1% |
| 21 | June 22 | 6.3% | 6.6% | 6.6% | 6.4% |
| 22 | June 23 | 6.8% | 7.0% | 7.7% | 7.5% |
| 23 | June 29 | 6.2% | 6.9% | 6.3% | 6.3% |
| 24 | June 30 | 6.4% | 6.5% | 6.8% | 6.8% |
| 25 | July 6 | 5.9% | 6.8% | 6.3% | 6.5% |
| 26 | July 7 | 8.4% | 9.3% | 9.2% | 9.0% |
| 27 | July 13 | 7.3% | 8.5% | 6.8% | 7.7% |
| 28 | July 14 | 6.7% | 6.8% | 7.4% | 8.0% |
| 29 | July 20 | 6.7% | 7.0% | 7.0% | 7.0% |
| 30 | July 21 | 8.1% | 9.2% | 7.5% | 8.2% |
| 31 | July 27 | 6.6% | 6.6% | 6.6% | 6.8% |
| 32 | July 28 | 6.5% | 6.7% | 6.9% | 7.2% |
| 33 | August 3 | 7.6% | 8.0% | 7.7% | 7.6% |
| 34 | August 4 | 8.0% | 7.7% | 7.0% | 7.5% |
| 35 | August 10 | 7.5% | 7.9% | 7.4% | 7.8% |
| 36 | August 11 | 7.5% | 8.0% | 7.0% | 7.5% |
| 37 | August 17 | 8.0% | 8.4% | 7.4% | 7.3% |
| 38 | August 18 | 7.4% | 7.5% | 7.7% | 8.0% |
| 39 | August 24 | 7.4% | 7.3% | 7.2% | 6.9% |
| 40 | August 25 | 7.3% | 7.1% | 8.2% | 8.1% |
| 41 | August 31 | 6.7% | 7.4% | 7.5% | 7.7% |
| 42 | September 1 | 6.9% | 7.4% | 7.6% | 7.8% |
| 43 | September 7 | 6.9% | 7.1% | 7.1% | 7.0% |
| 44 | September 8 | 6.7% | 7.0% | 7.4% | 7.6% |
| 45 | September 14 | 6.5% | 7.3% | 7.8% | 7.8% |
| 46 | September 15 | 7.3% | 7.8% | 7.8% | 7.5% |
| 47 | September 21 | 7.3% | 7.2% | 8.1% | 7.7% |
| 48 | September 22 | 7.7% | 8.3% | 8.4% | 8.4% |
| Average | | 7.0% | 7.3% | 7.3% | 7.5% |

== Awards and nominations ==
| Year | Award | Category | Recipient | Result | Ref. |
|---|---|---|---|---|---|
| 2013 | APAN Star Awards | Best Dressed | Yoo In-young | Won | |
| 2013 | SBS Drama Awards | Special Award, Actor in a Weekend/Daily Drama | Ahn Nae-sang | Nominated | |
| 2013 | SBS Drama Awards | Excellence Award, Actress in a Weekend/Daily Drama | Jeong Yu-mi | Nominated | |
| 2013 | SBS Drama Awards | Top Excellence Award, Actor in a Weekend/Daily Drama | Jung Gyu-woon | Nominated | |

== International broadcast ==
- It aired in Vietnam on TodayTV VTC7 from February 9, 2014, under the title Mẹ Ơi, Cố Lên. It aired in the Philippines on NET25 from May 25, 2026 under the same title.
