= Yoon Ji-min =

South Korean actress (born 1977)

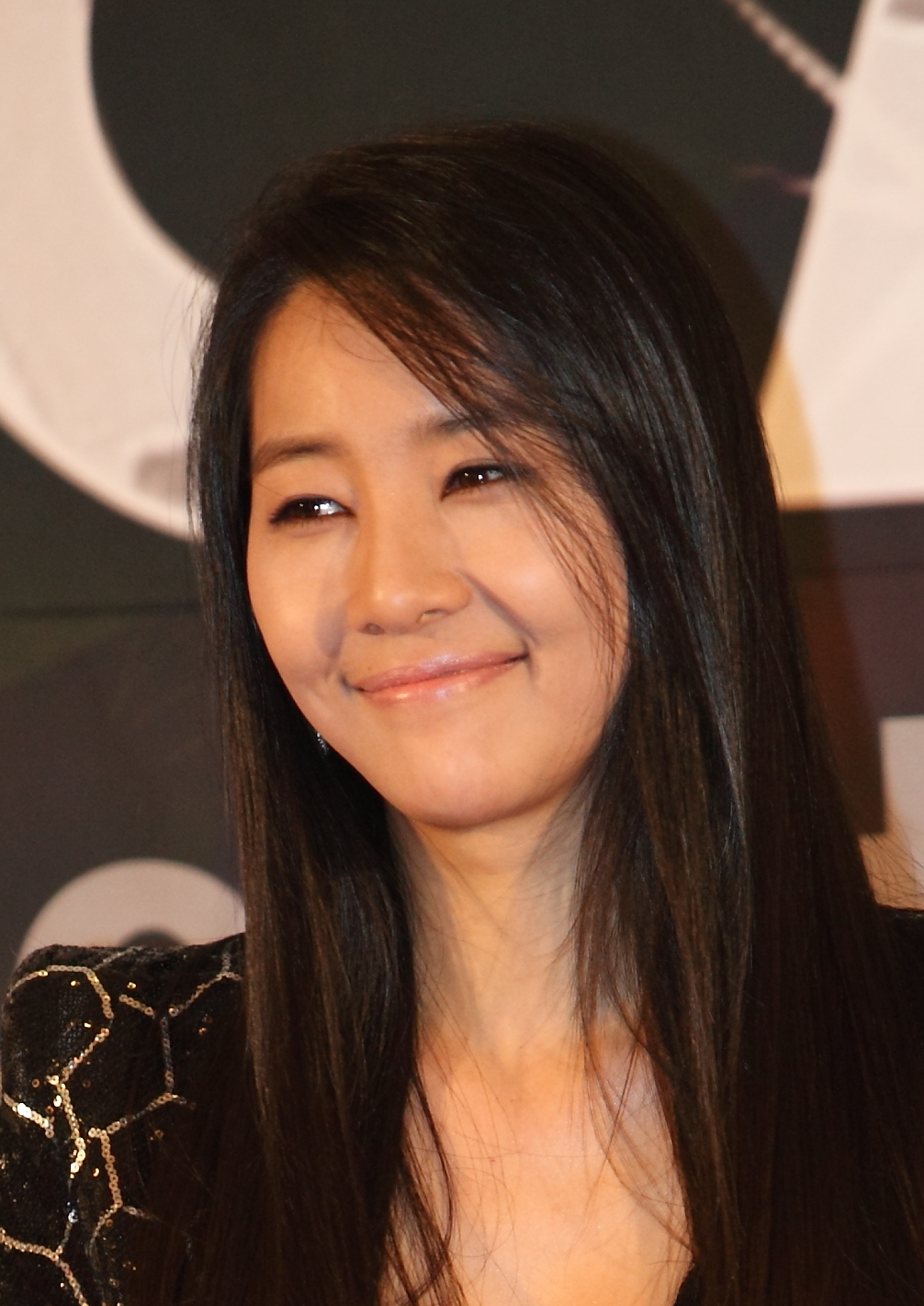
- Born: Yoon Ji-young; December 9, 1977 (age 48); Dongdaemun District, Seoul, South Korea
- Education: Dongduk Women's University - Sports Model
- Occupation: Actress
- Agent: Plum ANC
- Spouse: Kwon Hae-sung (m. 2013)
- Children: 1

Korean name
- Hangul: 윤지영
- RR: Yun Jiyeong
- MR: Yun Chiyŏng

Stage name
- Hangul: 윤지민
- RR: Yun Jimin
- MR: Yun Chimin

Yoon Ji-young (Korean: 윤지영; born December 9, 1977), known professionally as Yoon Ji-min (Korean: 윤지민), is a South Korean actress and model. She played Ji in the period action series Warrior Baek Dong-soo.

== Personal life ==
She married actor Kwon Min (Kwon Hae-sung) on July 13, 2013 at THE RAUM, Seoul. On December 20, 2014, Ji-min gave birth to her daughter.

== Filmography ==
=== Film ===
Year	Title	Role	Notes	Ref.
2002	Sex of Magic	Madonna		
2003	Love of South and North	Miss Kim		
2006	Monopoly	Elly		
2007	The Worst Guy Ever	Mi-yun		
2009	Outlaw	Lee Gyeong-jin		
2011	Shotgun Love	Kyung-ah		
2011	Spellbound	Sun-woo		

=== Television series ===
Year	Title	Role	Notes	Ref.
1998–2000	Soonpoong Clinic	Yoon Ji-min		
1999–2000	Kaist	Yoon Ji-min		
1999–2000	March			
2006	Invincible Parachute Agent	Alice Jean / Jung Yoon-hee		
2007	H.I.T	Jung In-hee		
2007	Finding Love	Kim Yoon-seo		
2008	Lottery Trio	Baek Hye-mi		
2009	Two Wives	Oh Hye-ran		
2010	The Slave Hunters	Yoon-ji		
2010	Kiss and The City	Yoon Ji-min		
2011	Paradise Ranch	Ji Mil-hye		
2011	Warrior Baek Dong-soo	Ji / Ga Ok		
2012	Syndrome	Kim Yi-joon		
2012	I Need a Fairy	Ma Tae-hee		
2012–2013	I Love You	Soo-bin		
2013	Wonderful Mama	Han Se-ah	Cameo	
2013	Your Neighbor's Wife	Kim Ji-young		
2014	Noble Woman	Yoo Hwa-young		
2016	Woman with a Suitcase	Jo Ye-ryung		
2017	Voice	Jang Gyu-a	Season 1, episode 6	
2017–2018	Oh, the Mysterious	Hostess		
2018	Partners for Justice	Lee Hye-sung		
2019	Joseon Survival Period	Jeong Nan-jeong		
2019–2020	Crash Landing on You	Go Sang-ah		

=== Web series ===
Year	Title	Role	Notes	Ref.
2017	Dream Change Laundromat	Fei		
2017	Revive Hope, Mister Go Yong	Labour supervisor		
2022	Boys Flight	Park In-sun	Season 1–2	
2022	Anna	Yoon So-young		

=== Television show ===
- Our Cha Cha Cha (2022) - Cast Member
- Actress House Seasons 1-2 ( 2011)
- Rollercoaster (2010)
- Real Story 묘 (2009)

== Theater ==
- Proposal (2011)

== Awards ==
- 2006 SBS Drama Awards: New Star Award (Korea Secret Agency)
