= Hello Franceska =

- Also known as: Hello, Francesca
- Genre: Horror; Comedy; Vampire; Sitcom; Black comedy; Satire
- Written by: Shin Jung-gu (seasons 1-2); Kim Hyun-hee (season 3)
- Directed by: Noh Do-chul (seasons 1-2); Jo Hee-jin (season 3)
- Starring: Shim Hye-jin; Lee Doo-il; Jung Ryeo-won; Lee Kyeon; Park Seul-gi; Park Hee-jin; Shin Hae-chul; Kim Soo-mi; Kang Doo; Hyun Young; Lee In-sung
- Country of origin: South Korea
- Original language: Korean
- No. of seasons: 3
- No. of episodes: 52

Production
- Producers: Kim Jung-wook; Lee Hong-woo
- Cinematography: Sung Soon-dong (season 3)
- Running time: 50 minutes

Original release
- Network: Munhwa Broadcasting Corporation
- Release: January 24, 2005 – February 27, 2006

Related
- Francesca Next Door

Hello Franceska (Korean: 안녕, 프란체스카) is a South Korean sitcom that aired on MBC from 2005 to 2006 on Sundays at 23:00 for three seasons.

The first and second seasons aired from January 24 to August 1, 2005 for 29 episodes. The third season, with new cast members, aired from September 9, 2005 to February 27, 2006 for 23 episodes.

The Addams Family-inspired show became a cult hit. At the 41st Baeksang Arts Awards in 2005, Hello Franceska won Best Entertainment Program and Best Female Variety Performer for Park Hee-jin. It was later adapted into a 2006 animated film titled Ani Francesca (voiced by some of the original actors), and a 2008 stage musical titled Hi Franceska. A spin-off of the series titled Francesca Next Door is scheduled to premiere on Wavve on November 6, 2026.

== Plot ==
Romania, 2005. The last of the vampire families on earth are sent by their leader to different places all over the world, and told to hide themselves and live among humans until "the glory of their empire" is restored.

However, a group of vampires heading for Tokyo takes the wrong ship and arrives in Korea. They run into Doo-il, a timid and unlucky salaryman in his forties who's just been rejected by the woman he loves. One of the vampires, Franceska, bites him by mistake and he becomes one of them. They promise Doo-il that they will turn him back into a human on the day their leader comes to find them; meanwhile, they have to live with him. Left with no other choice, Doo-il reluctantly agrees.

Disguised as a family of five, Doo-il and the vampires start new lives in Seoul. There's Franceska, who acts as Doo-il's wife, with the other three, Elizabeth, Kyeon and Sophia as their fake children. Franceska is a 500-year-old vampire descended from one of the most prestigious vampire families; she is cynical, sophisticated, and seemingly cold, but later becomes addicted to gambling (horse racing, Go-Stop). Pretty and stylish Elizabeth gets a job at a trendy boutique and searches for her perfect mate by dating an endless string of men. Kyeon survived on chicken blood during the worst famine in vampire history, which damaged his brain and made him simple-minded. 1,875-year-old Sophia is the oldest among the four vampires, but trapped in the body of a teenage girl. The vampires find human life alternately odd and fascinating, and as Doo-il constantly worries about everything, they eventually warm to his kind heart.

== Cast ==
=== Seasons 1-2 ===
- Shim Hye-jin as Franceska
- Lee Doo-il as Doo-il
- Jung Ryeo-won as Elizabeth
- Lee Kyeon as Kyeon
- Park Seul-gi as Sophia
- Park Hee-jin as Ahn Sung-daek
- Shin Hae-chul as Andre
- Chang Kwang-hyo as Jang Saem
- Kim Won-chul as Kim Won-chul
- Lee Su-na as Lee Su-na
- Lee Sa-bi as Victoria (guest, episode 21)
- Daniel Henney as Elizabeth's first love (guest, episodes 47-48)

=== Season 3 ===
- Shim Hye-jin as Franceska
- Kim Soo-mi as Isabella
- Kang Doo as Daniel
- Hyun Young as Diana
- Park Seul-gi as Sophia
- Lee In-sung as In-sung
- Yeo Woon-kay as Woon-kye
- Yoo Tae-woong as Casanova
- Kim Chang-ryeol as Carlos
- Kim Do-hyang as Do-hyang
- Choi Kyu-hwan as (guest)
- Jung Ji-in as In-sung's friend at the academy (guest)
- Jung Ga-eun as (guest)
- Lee Hwi-jae as (guest)

== See also ==
- List of vampire television series
