= High School Style Icon =

- Genre: Fashion, Variety Show, Survival Show
- Starring: Kim Hee-chul
- Country of origin: South Korea
- Original language: Korean
- No. of seasons: 2
- No. of episodes: 15

Production
- Running time: 70 minutes

Original release
- Network: YouTube
- Release: June 7, 2019 – May 11, 2020

High School Style Icon (Korean: 고등학생 간지대회) is a South Korean survival audition program. It airs on YouTube on Monday, at 20:00 (KST).

== Format ==
High School Style Icon is a fashion audition program, which is produced by Blank Corporation and broadcast for high school students via YouTube and Naver TV. In season 1, 13 high school students compete in different fashion challenges and in Season 2, 20 high school students participate.

The program is conducted in a survival way, and the participants who pass the preliminary round are eliminated through various missions, and the final winner is given an annual salary of 100 million won ($90,000 USD), Hyodo Benz, and an opportunity to launch their own brand. In Season 2, a trip to Paris will also be awarded.

== Host ==
- Kim Hee-chul (Season 1-2)

== Judging Panel ==
- Park Tae Il (Season 1-2)
- Reddy (Season 1-2)
- Han Hyeyeon (Season 1-2)
- Moon Gabi (Season 1)
- Stephanie Lee (Season 2)
- Eum Hyeokjin (Season 2)

== Season 1 ==
=== Contestants ===
Name	Age	Highschool	Ranking
Ju Seunghyun	19	Korea Fashion Design Occupational College	
Park Seongjin	19	Ulsan Samsan Highschool	
Choi Junghun	18	Busan Namil Highschool	
Lim Hwisun	18	Whimoon Highschool	2
Yun Subin	19	Sokcho Girl's Highschool	
Oh Yoonseo	19	Apgujeong Highschool	
Shim Suhyun	18	Yangcheon Highschool	3
Yu Bi	19	Seoul Design Highschool	1
Lee Changbin	19	Ilsan International Convention Highschool	
Oh Narim	19	Daegu Hyehwa Girl's Highschool	
Geum Gyojin	18	Daegu Kyeongmyeong Girl's Highschool	
Jeong Leemong	19	Suwon	
Jeon Junwu	19	Seocho School of Cultural Arts and Information	

=== Mission ===
order	Mission	1st place and winner	Drop out
First meeting mission	Carrier Styling	Ju Seunghyun	X
1st mission	Keyword Styling	Yu Bi	Oh Yoonseo
2nd mission	Hipster Styling	Flexo team	Park Seongjin, Choi Junghun
3rd mission	Similar Look OOTD	Jeong Leemong, Geum Gyojin	Oh Narim, Lee Changbin, Ju Seunghyun
4th mission	Web Ripped & Women Styling	Shim Suhyun	Jeon Junwu, Yun Subin, Jeong Leemong
Semi-final	Music Video Styling	Yu Bi	Geum Gyojin
Final	Le Coq Sportif Brand Styling	Yu Bi	X

== Season 2 (Round 2) ==
Kim Heechul was introduced as the main host of the second season. The judges during the preliminary round includes Reddy, Han Heayoun, Park Taeil and Stephanie Lee. Reddy, Han Heayoun and Park Taeil were previous judges from the first season.

The second season started with the introduction of 100 teens whom applied with their OOTD photos and fashion vlog introduction. The 100 candidates participated in the preliminary round where only 20 candidates were chosen to proceed to the second round.

The grand prize for winning the competition includes 100 million won, Mercedes Benz, opportunity to launch own brand and a trip to Paris, France.

PRELIMINARY ROUND

The preliminary mission is to dress-up and style a complete outfit choosing from the 30-ton of clothing dumped into the set. The challenge is set around 30 minutes and whomever failed to be back in their set position within the time limit will automatically fail.

=== Contestants ===
The following were chosen by the judges from the preliminary round. The 20 candidates are listed from the highest score to the lowest score.

Preliminary Round Ranking
Ranking	Participant	Ranking	Participant
1	Jung Hayoung	11	Jung Dabin
2	Choi Jiyun	12	Jang Won
3	Jung Hyunwoo	13	Hwang Ingun
4	Yun Sanghyuk	14	Han Seunghun
5	Jung Taeheung	15	Kim Rachel Yoory
6	Jung Donghun	16	Kang Sejun
7	Yu Jimin	17	Kim Seoyeon
8	Lee Juseung	18	Kim Yechan
9	Ryu Seoyeon	19	Ha Neulpureun
10	Im Sungjun	20	Lee Yuna

FIRST MISSION

In the second episode, the 20 participants were introduced to the first mission. It is the famous "carrier mission". However, for the second season they added twists for the challenge. The top ranking candidates from the preliminary round will choose from the ten 2020 S/S trend keywords and a candidate to compete against.

The first mission is to style the given clothing (according to the trend keyword) using the items from their own carriers and compete in a 1 vs 1 battle with the other participant. The challenge is set around 20 minutes. Whoever lose in the 1 vs 1 battle will be on the edge of the elimination. Only 15 participants may proceed to the next round.

The judges for the second season were introduced and judged the first mission:

- Reddy- rapper
- Park Taeil- Bellboy editor
- Han Heayoun- superstar stylist
- Stephanie Lee- actress and model
- Eum Hyeokjin- genderless model

Carrier Mission + 2020 S/S Trend Keywords
Trend Keywords	1 vs 1 Battle	Winner
Crochet- use of yarn or strands to make clothes using knitting techniques	Jung Hayoung vs Jung Dabin	Jung Hayoung
Animal Print- clothing style that resembles skin, fur, feathers or scales of animals	Choi Jiyun vs Kim Yechan	Choi Jihyun: 4. Kim Yechan*
Denim Patchwork- stitching pieces of geometrical shapes of cloth into the denim fabric	Jung Hyunwoo vs Jang Won	Jung Hyunwoo
Paint Print- customize and applied using different techniques for customization and expression	Yun Sanghyuk vs Ryu Seoyeon	Ryu Seoyeon: 2. Yun Sanghyuk*
Newtro Print-reinterpretation of vintage and retro design styles	Jung Taeheung vs Lee Yuna	Lee Yuna
Dot- spot printed in the fabric that creates pattern	Jung Donghun vs Lee Juseung	Lee Juseung: 5. Jung Donghun*
Pastel Color-soft and muted colors on fabric	Yu Jimin vs Hwang Ingun	Hwang Ingun: 1. Yu Jimin*
Leather Dressing- strong and durable material from animal skin's tanning procedures	Im Sungjun vs Han Seunghun	Im Sungjun
Athleisure- casual and comfortable clothing used for exercise or everyday wear	Kim Rachel Yoory vs Kang Sejun	Kang Sejun
Organza- thin and sheer fabric traditionally made from silk	Kim Seoyeon vs Ha Neulpureun	Kim Seoyeon: 3. Ha Neulpureun*

*The 5 participants on the brink of the elimination were numbered as they were called safe from elimination.

Name	Age	Highschool	Ranking
Jung Donghun	19	Duksan Highschool	
Kang Sejun	18		3
Kim Yechan	19	Kwangshin Highschool	
Han Seunghun	19	Sukji Highschool	
Kim Seoyeon	19	Hanlim Arts School	
Ryu Seoyeon	19	Lila Art Highschool	
Jung Dabin	17	Sinseo Highschool	
Lee Yuna	18	Hanlim Arts School	1
Im Sungjun	20	Bansong Highschool	
Yu Sunghyuk	18	Mogye Highschool	
Ha Neulpureun	19	Donga Girl's Highschool	
Yu Jimin	17	Hanlim Arts School	
Kim Rachel Yoory	18	Lila Art Highschool	
Lee Juseung	19	Gyeonggi Gwangju Highschool	
Jung Taeheung	17	Jeungpyeong Technical Highschool	
Jung Hyunwoo	19	Busan Arts Highschool	
Jang Won	19	Jangyu Highschool	
Hwang Ingeon	18	Seoincheon Highschool	
Choi Jiyun	18	Eunkwang Girl's Highschool	
Jung Hayoung	19		2
