= Yun Wŏnhyŏng =

Korean scholar-official (1503–1565)

Yun Wŏnhyŏng 윤원형

Chief State Councillor
- In office February 9, 1563 – September 9, 1565
- Preceded by: Sang Chin
- Succeeded by: Yi Chun'gyŏng

Right State Councillor
- In office June 15, 1558 – November 16, 1558
- Preceded by: Yun Kae
- Succeeded by: An Hyŏn
- In office October 14, 1551 – October 17, 1551
- Preceded by: Sang Chin
- Succeeded by: Yun Kae

Personal details
- Born: 1509 Joseon
- Died: November 18, 1565 (aged 55–56) Gangeum-hyeon, Paju, Gyeonggi Province, Joseon

Yun Wŏnhyŏng (Korean: 윤원형, 尹元衡; 1509 – November 18, 1565) was a Korean political figure of the Joseon period. He was the younger brother of Queen Munjeong, the 3rd wife of the 11th King Jungjong of Joseon and was the maternal uncle of the 13th King Myeongjong.

He was Chief State Councillor from 1563 to 1565. His courtesy name was Ŏnp'yŏng (언평; 彦平). In 1565, after the death of Queen Munjeong, both Yun and his wife, Jeong Nan-jeong, were exiled from the capital. Unable to make a political comeback, both committed suicide by poison.

== Biography ==
In 1509, Yun Wŏnhyŏng was born as the fourth son and youngest child of Yun Chiim and Lady Yi of the Jeonui Yi clan. He was the younger brother of Queen Munjeong and a third cousin of Queen Janggyeong and Yun Im. He was also the great-great-grandnephew of Queen Jeonghui, who was the wife of Sejo of Joseon, the 7th King of Joseon. At 2-years-old, Yun's mother died.

Yun was a political figure from an aristocratic family and had a maternal relation to the royal family of the Joseon Dynasty. His family was of the Papyeong Yun clan (파평 윤씨; 坡平 尹氏). His niece, Royal Noble Consort Suk, the daughter of his brother Yun Wonryang, later became a concubine to King Injong. (Note: son of King Junjong and Queen Janggyeong)

In March 1515, Jungjong's second wife, Queen Janggyeong died and Jungjong formally married Yun Wŏnhyŏng's older sister, Lady Yun, to be the new Queen Consort. Their son was Grand Prince Gyeongwon (the future King Myeongjong).

In 1533, Yun Wŏnhyŏng passed the national examinations, and was appointed to the literature department of Byeol to become an officer. While pursuing an officer position, Yun also sought to make his nephew, Grand Prince Gyeongwon, the next king of Joseon. Yun was temporarily exiled for his actions but came back in 1544. He ran into some conflicts with two relatives who were officials: Yun Im and Kim Allo.

This made for a difficult situation since Kim Allo's granddaughter (the daughter of Princess Hyohye and his son, Kim Hŭi) had married Yun Wŏnhyŏng's own nephew, Yun Paekwŏn. Also, Yun Im was the maternal uncle of Injong and the older brother of Queen Janggyeong.

In 1543, King Jungjong died. In 1545, King Injong died. Yun Wŏnhyŏng killed his opponents and relatives who supported his third cousin, among these being Yun Im. Later, his brother Yun Wollo was killed (the Eulsa massacre). In 1546, he controlled political powers. In 1547, he became Minister of Personnel (Ijo P'ansŏ), in 1551 Left State Councillor, and in 1563, Chief State Councillor.

When Queen Munjeong died in 1565, he lost all political power. This caused him and his second wife, Jeong Nan-Jeong to commit suicide.

== Family ==
- Father
  - Yun Chiim (윤지임; 尹之任; 1475 – April 14, 1534)
- Mother
  - Internal Princess Consort Jeonseong of the Jeonui Yi clan (전성부부인 전의 이씨; 全城府夫人 全義李氏; 1475–1511)
- Sibling(s)
  - Older brother: Yun Wongae (윤원개; 尹元凱; 1493–1535)
  - Older brother: Yun Wonryang (윤원량; 尹元亮; 1495–1569)
  - Older brother: Yun Wonp'il (윤원필; 尹元弼; 1496 – May 9, 1547)
  - Older sister: Lady Yun of the Papyeong Yun clan (윤씨; 1499–?)
  - Older sister: Queen Munjeong of the Papyeong Yun clan (문정왕후 윤씨; 文定王后 尹氏; December 2, 1501 – May 5, 1565)
    - Brother-in-law: Yi Yeok, King Jungjong of Joseon (조선 중종; April 16, 1488 – November 29, 1544)
  - Older brother: Yun Wollo (윤원로; 尹元老; 1503–1546)
- Wives and their issue(s)
  - Lady Kim of the Yonan Kim clan (연안 김씨; 1509–?); daughter of Kim Ansu (김안수, 金安遂; 1485–1551)
    - Daughter: Lady Yun of the Papyeong Yun clan (파평 윤씨; 1536–?)
    - Son: Yun Ch'ongwŏn (윤충원; 尹忠源; 1540–?)
    - Son: Yun Hyowŏn (윤효원; 尹孝源; 1550–?)
  - Jeong Nan-jeong (정난정; 鄭允謙) of the Chogye Jeong clan (초계 정씨; 草溪 鄭氏; 1509–November 13, 1565)
    - Daughter: Lady Yun of the Papyeong Yun clan (파평 윤씨; 1545–?)

== Popular culture ==
- Portrayed by Kim Jun-kyung in the 2013 KBS2 TV series The Fugitive of Joseon.
- Portrayed by Jung Joon-ho in the 2016 MBC TV series The Flower in Prison.
- Portrayed by Han Jae-suk in the 2019 TV Chosun TV series Joseon Survival Period.

== See also ==
- Eulsa massacre
- Jeong Nan-jeong
- Yi Ki
- Yun Im, Yun's third cousin
- Queen Jeonghui, Yun's ascendant through his father
- Queen Janggyeong, Yun's third cousin
- Kim Allo

== Sources ==
- Lee, Hong-jik, ed. (1983). 새國史事典 (Sae guksa sajeon) (Encyclopedia of Korean history). Seoul: Gyohaksa.
- Lee, Ki-baek (tr. E.W. Wagner and E.J. Shultz) (1984). A new history of Korea. Seoul: Ilchokak.
- Lee, Il-cheong, ed. (1993). 인명국사대사전 (Inmyeong guksa sajeon). Seoul: Goryeo Munhwasa.
