= Jeong Nan-jeong =

Korean politician (1506–1565)

- Korean name
- Hangul: 정난정
- Hanja: 鄭蘭貞
- RR: Jeong Nanjeong
- MR: Chŏng Nanjŏng

Jeong Nan-jeong (Korean: 정난정; Hanja: 鄭蘭貞; 1509 – November 13, 1565) was a Korean de facto politician of the Joseon period.

== Biography ==
Lady Jeong was born in Hanseong into the Chogye Jeong clan to Jeong Yun-gyeom, a deputy general, and his concubine, Lady Nam. She was the illegitimate daughter among her father's three sons and two daughters. Lady Jeong's mother was a slave because she was involved in treason, and was eventually assigned to the house of Jeong Yun-gyeom.

When she was young, she fell in love with Yun Won-hyeong, the younger brother of Queen Munjeong, and became his concubine. Lady Jeong soon became the influential concubine of Yun Won-hyeong, who himself was the maternal uncle of King Myeongjong, and chief state councilor during 1563 to 1565.

Later, when Kim Allo's conspiracy to dethrone Queen Munjeong was discovered, Kim Allo was investigated and she poisoned Kim Allo's first cousin once removed, Yun Won-hyeong's first wife, Lady Kim. After that, in the 8th year of King Myeongjong's reign, Queen Munjeong had made it a priority to make Lady Jeong her sister-in-law.

She soon became the second wife with full status. She became very close to her sister-in-law Queen Munjeong, and gained a good amount of wealth. But because she was the second wife, the children of Lady Kim inherited the wealth of the clan rather than her own.

In 1565, after the death of Queen Munjeong, both Lady Jeong and Yun Won-hyeong were exiled from the capital and, unable to make a political comeback, both committed suicide by poison (Lady Jeong first, followed by her husband five days later).

== Family ==
- Father: Jeong Yun-gyeom (정윤겸; 鄭允謙; 1463–1536)
  - Grandfather: Jeong On (정온; 鄭溫; 1435–1508)
  - Grandmother: Lady, of the Wonju Won clan (원주 원씨; 1428–?); eldest daughter of Won Ja-min (원자민; 元自敏; 1380–?)
- Mother: Lady, of the Nam clan (남씨; 南氏; 1473–?)
- Husband: Yun Won-hyeong (윤원형; 尹元衡; 1509 – 18 November 1565)
- Issue
  - Daughter: Lady Yun (윤씨; 1545–?)
    - Son-in-law: Yi Jo-min (이조민; 李肇敏; 1541–?)
      - Granddaughter: Lady, of the Yongin Yi clan (용인 이씨; 1560–?)

== In popular culture ==
- Portrayed by Kang Soo-yeon in the 2001 SBS TV series Ladies in the Palace.
- Portrayed by Park Joo-mi in the 2016 MBC TV series Flowers of the Prison.
- Portrayed by Yoon Ji-min in the 2019 TV Chosun TV series Joseon Survival Period.

== See also ==
- Eulsa literati purge
