= Francesca Next Door =

2026 South Korean television series

- Promotional poster
- Hangul: 옆자리, 프란체스카
- Lit.: The Seat Next to Me, Franceska
- RR: Yeopjari, Peurancheseuka
- MR: Yŏpchari, P'ŭranch'esŭk'a
- Genre: Romantic fantasy; Teen comedy
- Written by: Lee Myung-hoon
- Directed by: Park Sang-woo
- Starring: Han Su-a; Kim Hyun-jin; Lee Seung-gyu
- Country of origin: South Korea
- Original language: Korean
- No. of episodes: 4

Production
- Production companies: MBC; CAC Corporation

Original release
- Network: Wavve
- Release: November 6 – November 13, 2026

Related
- Hello Franceska

Francesca Next Door (Korean: 옆자리, 프란체스카) is an ongoing South Korean romantic fantasy comedy television series written by Lee Myung-hoon, directed by Park Sang-woo, and starring Han Su-a, Kim Hyun-jin, and Lee Seung-gyu. It is a spin-off of the 2005–2006 MBC sitcom Hello Franceska, the series shifts the original vampire universe into a high school setting and follows the story of a teenage vampire who wants to live a normal life. The series premiered on Wavve on November 6, 2026. It is also available for streaming on Kocowa.

== Premise ==
Pi Na-yeong is a teenage vampire who leaves Romania to navigate the human world, finding herself completely out of her depth in a modern high school classroom. Her world shifts when she meets Jang U-ju, a dedicated student whose strict focus on medical school is tested when he is enlisted to help her acclimate. Balancing warnings from a shadowy fellow vampire, Yu-hyeol, with the pressures of teenage life and a budding romance with U-ju, Na-yeong must keep her true nature hidden.

== Cast and characters ==
=== Main ===
- Han Su-a as Pi Na-yeong / Francesca, a vampire who wants to live like a normal high school student.
- Kim Hyun-jin as Jang U-ju, a second-year class president at Duil High School and the youngest son of a medical family.
- Lee Seung-gyu as Yu-hyeol, a vampire.

=== Supporting ===
- Yoo Young-woo
- Chung Seung-je as Na-young's homeroom teacher
- Yoo Byung-kwon

=== Special appearances ===
- Shim Hye-jin as Franceska
- Park Seul-gi as Sophia
- Park Hee-jin as Ahn Seung-daek

== Production ==
=== Development ===
The series is a high school romantic fantasy spin-off of the 2005–2006 cult-classic MBC sitcom Hello Franceska. While the original series followed a family of vampires in a family-oriented sitcom format, the spin-off is reimagined as a mid-form school comedy set in 2026. The series is jointly produced by MBC and CAC Corporation. It is directed by Park Sang-hoon and written by rookie screenwriter Lee Myung-hoon.

=== Casting ===
In August 2026, Han Su-a, Kim Hyun-jin, Lee Seung-gyu were cast to lead the series. Additionally, original cast members Shim Hye-jin, Park Seul-gi, and Park Hee-jin would make special appearances, reprising their roles to bridge the 20-year gap between universes.

In September 2026, Yoo Young-woo, Chung Seung-je, and Yoo Byun-kwon joined to play supporting roles.

== Release ==
The series was reported for a November 2026 release. Later, Wavve confirmed the premiere date to be on November 6. It will also be available for streaming on Kocowa in selected territories.
