= Top Star =

- Promotional poster for Top Star
- Directed by: Park Joong-hoon
- Written by: Choi Seok-hwan; Park Joong-hoon
- Produced by: Kim Seong-cheol; Park Joong-hoon
- Starring: Uhm Tae-woong; Kim Min-jun; So Yi-hyun
- Cinematography: Jo Sang-yeun
- Edited by: Park Gok-ji
- Music by: Lee Ji-soo
- Production company: Seum Production
- Distributed by: Lotte Entertainment
- Release dates: October 6, 2013 (Busan International Film Festival); October 24, 2013 (South Korea)
- Running time: 103 minutes
- Country: South Korea
- Language: Korean

Top Star (Korean: 톱스타; RR: Topseuta) is a 2013 South Korean drama film directed, co-written and produced by veteran actor Park Joong-hoon, in his directorial debut. It stars Uhm Tae-woong as the manager of a top actor who dreams of someday becoming famous like his client, but when a twist of fate grants his wish, his life completely changes. The film premiered at the 18th Busan International Film Festival.

== Plot ==
Tae-sik is the talent manager of top celebrity Won-joon, but he has long wanted to be an actor. He unexpectedly gets his chance when Won-joon becomes involved in a hit and run accident and Tae-sik takes the fall instead by claiming he was the driver. In exchange, Won-joon promises to give Tae-sik a small role in his next film. But Tae-sik's acting career soon takes off after he gets out of jail, and his success and stardom starts to threaten and eclipse Won-joon's. Tae-sik's popularity finally overtakes Won-joon's, but his pure passion for acting turns into greed and ego. As he loses touch with his roots, he neglects the relationships he formed on the way up. Now, in order to maintain his fame, Tae-sik will stop at nothing to stay on top.

== Cast ==
- Uhm Tae-woong as Tae-sik
- Kim Min-jun as Won-joon
- So Yi-hyun as Mi-na
- Kim Soo-ro as Choi Kang-chul
- Lee Jun-hyeok as Sang-chul, Tae-sik's manager
- Oh Seong-soo as Department head Jo
- Jo Seok-hyun as Lee Joo-bok
- Jung Gyu-soo as Kim Bong-soo
- Kang Sung-jin as Reporter Park
- Kim Jin-geun as Director Kim Sung-cheol
- Go Eun-yi as Mapo queen
- Woo Ki-hong as Director Jung Chang-min
- Kim Ki-cheon as Parking warden
- Kang Ku-hyun as Assistant cameraman
- Moon Jeong-soo as Department head Park
- Yu Ji-yeon as Attorney Lee
- Yang Myeong-heon as Attorney Hong
- Park Hee-geon as young Tae-sik
- Kim Tae-min as young Sang-chul
- Joo Min-ha as Entertainment Tonight reporter
- Kim Dong-hyeon as Entertainment Tonight producer
- Kim Min-seung as Detective at Jeongdongjin police substation
- Bae Jung-sik as Detective 1
- Kim Yong-jin as Detective 2
- Kim Tae-hyun as Lover of young Kim Bong-soo
- Lee Seung-won as Wine bar manager
- Lee Seung-ha as Actress in Into the Wind
- Hong Ji-young as Host of Into the Wind stage greeting
- Ji-woo as Won-joon's male junior colleague
- Kang Ji-hye as Won-joon's female junior colleague 1
- Park Ah-in as Won-joon's female junior colleague 2
- Kang Ji-hye as Fan club president
- Kim Hye-ri as Female student
- Lee Yeong-hoon as Song of the Sun gunman 2
- Jo Myeong-haeng as Song of the Sun butcher 2
- Kwon Hoe-su as Song of the Sun butcher 3
- Choi Seong-gyeom as Song of the Sun butcher 5
- Lee Soo-in as Reporter Lee
- Lee Geum-hee as Host of Today's Critics Awards
- Kim Sung-kyung as News anchor 1
- Han Soo-jin as News anchor 2
- Ahn Sung-ki as Kim Kyung-min (cameo)
- Uhm Jung-hwa as herself, presenter at the Blue Dragon Film Awards (cameo)
- Nam Gyu-ri as Actress in Ice Flower (cameo)
- Ryoo Seung-wan as Director of Ice Flower (cameo)
- Lee Hyun-seung as Director Choi (cameo)
- Jo Seon-mook as Kyung-min's manager (cameo)
- Kim Kwang-sik as Cinematographer (cameo)
- Kim Gu-taek as Director Gu Tae-jin (cameo)

== Remake ==
Chinese production company Aim Media bought the remake rights in 2014.
