= Joseon Survival Period =

2019 South Korean television series

- Hangul: 조선생존기
- RR: Joseon saengjongi
- MR: Chosŏn saengjon'gi
- Genre: Historical; Fantasy
- Written by: Kim Sol-ji
- Directed by: Jang Yong-woo
- Starring: Kang Ji-hwan (Ep. 1–10); Seo Ji-seok (Ep. 11–16); Kyung Soo-jin; Song Won-seok; Park Se-wan; Lee Jae-yoon; Han Jae-suk; Yoon Ji-min
- Country of origin: South Korea
- Original language: Korean
- No. of episodes: 16

Production
- Running time: 60 minute
- Production companies: Huayi Brothers Korea; Lotte Cultureworks; Hi Ground

Original release
- Network: TV Chosun
- Release: June 8 – August 17, 2019

Joseon Survival Period (Korean: 조선생존기) is a 2019 South Korean television series starring Kang Ji-hwan (replaced by Seo Ji-seok from episode 11 onwards), Kyung Soo-jin, Song Won-seok, Park Se-wan, Lee Jae-yoon, Han Jae-suk and Yoon Ji-min. It aired on TV Chosun from June 8 to August 17, 2019 on Saturdays and Sundays at 22:50 (KST).

== Synopsis ==
The story of Han Jung-rok, a deliveryman who used to be a famous Olympic archer, who travels back in time to the Joseon dynasty along with his sister, his ex fiance and her current fiance, they get embroiled in the palace intrigue of the Joseon dynasty.

== Cast ==
=== Main ===
- Kang Ji-hwan / Seo Ji-seok as Han Jeong-rok (Note: Kang Ji-hwan was replaced by Seo Ji-seok from episode 11 onwards.)
- Kyung Soo-jin as Lee Hye-jin
- Song Won-seok as Im Kkeokjeong
- Park Se-wan as Han Seul-gi
- Lee Jae-yoon as Jeong Ga-ik
- Han Jae-suk as Yun Won-hyeong
- Yoon Ji-min as Jeong Nan-jeong

=== Supporting ===
- Lee Kyung-jin as Queen Munjeong
- Wi Yang-ho as Wang-chi
- Jung Han-hun as Kim Soon
- Shin Yi as Kisaeng Haeng-soo
- Park Ya-sung as Dong Chan
- Yoo In-hyuk
- Shim So-young as Lady Park
- Yoo Joo-eun as Cho Sun

== Production ==
The first script reading took place in March 2019.

On July 9, 2019, Kang Ji-hwan was arrested over allegations that he sexually molested and assaulted two of his agency's female employees at his home. He officially dropped out of the series on July 11 and was replaced by Seo Ji-seok from episode 11 onwards. The drama was cut off from 20 to 16 episodes.

== Original soundtrack ==
Joseon Survival Period OST

Soundtrack album by Various artists
- Released: 2019
- Genre: Soundtrack
- Languages: Korean; English
- Labels: Kakao M Huayi Brothers Korea

=== Part 1 ===
Released on June 16, 2019
No.	Title	Artist	Length
1.	"Someday"	Lee Hyun	4:00
2.	"Someday" (Inst.)		4:00
Total length:			8:00

=== Part 2 ===
Released on June 23, 2019
No.	Title	Artist	Length
1.	"You're My One"	Summer	3:50
2.	"You're My One" (Inst.)		3:50
Total length:			7:40

=== Part 3 ===
Released on June 30, 2019
No.	Title	Artist	Length
1.	"I'll Come To You Like the Wind"	Yeom Yu-ri	3:55
2.	"I'll Come To You Like the Wind" (Inst.)		3:55
Total length:			7:50

=== Part 4 ===
Released on July 7, 2019
No.	Title	Artist	Length
1.	"Shout Out"	Jinho; Hui; Kino; Wooseok	2:59
2.	"Shout Out" (Inst.)		2:59
Total length:			5:58

== Ratings ==
In this table, the blue numbers represent the lowest ratings and the red numbers represent the highest ratings.

Ep.	Original broadcast date	Average audience share (AGB Nielsen)
1	June 8, 2019	1.288%
2	June 9, 2019	1.255%
3	June 15, 2019	1.740%
4	June 16, 2019	1.399%
5	June 22, 2019	1.459%
6	June 23, 2019	1.256%
7	June 29, 2019	1.447%
8	June 30, 2019	1.439%
9	July 6, 2019	1.214%
10	July 7, 2019	1.428%
11	July 27, 2019	1.204%
12	July 28, 2019	1.050%
13	August 3, 2019	1.038%
14	August 10, 2019	0.948%
15	August 11, 2019	0.921%
16	August 17, 2019	0.852%
Average		1.244%
