= Partners for Justice =

South Korean television series

- Promotional poster for season 2
- Also known as: Investigation Couple
- Hangul: 검법남녀
- Hanja: 檢法男女
- RR: Geombeop namnyeo
- MR: Kŏmpŏp namnyŏ
- Genre: Crime; Mystery; Medical
- Screenplay by: Min Ji-eun (season 1–2); Won Young-sil (season 1); Jo Won-ki (season 2)
- Directed by: No Do-cheol (season 1–2); Hyun Ra-wae (season 1); Han Jin-sun (season 2)
- Starring: Jung Jae-young; Jeong Yu-mi
- Country of origin: South Korea
- Original language: Korean
- No. of seasons: 2
- No. of episodes: 32 (season 1–2) (Note: In order to circumvent Korean laws that prevent commercial breaks in the middle of an episode, what would previously have been aired as single 70 minute episodes are now being repackaged as two 35 minute episodes, with two episodes being shown each night with a commercial break between the two.)

Production
- Producer: Moon Bo-mi
- Running time: 70 minutes (35 minutes per episode)
- Production company: HB Entertainment

Original release
- Network: MBC TV
- Release: May 14, 2018 – July 29, 2019

Partners for Justice (Korean: 검법남녀) is a 2018 South Korean television series starring Jung Jae-young and Jeong Yu-mi. The first series aired on MBC in May 2018 on Mondays and Tuesdays at the 22:00 (KST). In October 2018, MBC announced that it was renewed for a second season, which premiered in 2019. Kang Seung-hyun and No Min-woo were announced as second series leads. It aired on MBC from June 3 to July 29, 2019.

== Series overview ==
Season	Episodes	Originally released			Time slot
Season	Episodes	First released	Last released	Network	Time slot
1	16	May 14, 2018	July 17, 2018	MBC TV	Mondays and Tuesdays at 22:00 (KST)
2	16	June 3, 2019	July 29, 2019	MBC TV	Mondays and Tuesdays at 21:00 (KST)

== Synopsis ==
About a forensic doctor, Baek Beom, who is skillful at his work but has an eccentric personality, and prosecutor, Eun Sol, who is a rookie prosecutor with a warm heart. She has a bright personality and comes from a wealthy family background. They come to work together to solve cases.

== Cast ==
=== Character appearances ===
Character	Portrayed by	Season	
Character	Portrayed by	1	2
Main
Baek Beom	Jung Jae-young	Main	Main
Eun Sol	Jeong Yu-mi	Main	Main
Kang Hyun	Park Eun-seok	Main	Guest
Do Ji-han	Oh Man-seok	Recurring	Main
Jang Chul / Dr. K	No Min-woo		Main
Supporting
Cha Soo-ho	Lee Yi-kyung	Recurring	Guest
Stella Hwang	Stephanie Lee	Recurring	
Sally	Kang Seung-hyun		Recurring
Jung Sung-joo	Ko Kyu-pil	Recurring	Recurring
Han Soo-yeon	Noh Susanna	Recurring	Recurring
Park Joong-Ho	Joo Jin-mo	Recurring	Recurring
Ma Do-Nam	Song Young-gyu	Recurring	Recurring
Kang Dong-Sik	Park Jun-gyu	Recurring	Recurring
Cheon Mi-Ho	Park Hee-jin	Recurring	Recurring
Yang Soo-Dong	Kim Young-woong	Recurring	Recurring
No Han-Shin	Ahn Suk-hwan	Recurring	Recurring
Kal Dae-Cheol	Lee Do-Guk		Recurring
Detective Park	Kim Ki-moo	Recurring	Recurring
Detective Kang	Min Pil-joon	Recurring	Recurring
Lee Hye-sang	Yoon Ji-min	Recurring	
Pyo Yoo-sung	Park Ji-il	Recurring	
Oh Man-sang	Kim Do-hyun (actor)	Recurring	Guest

=== Main ===
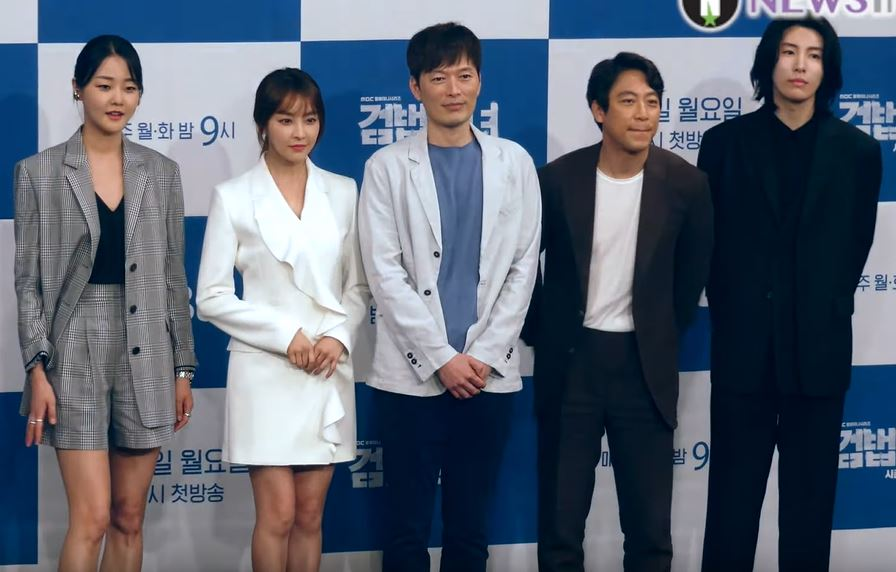
Main cast of series 2

- Jung Jae-young as Baek Beom

A forensic doctor with ten years of experience at the National Forensic Service. Although his skills are recognized, he is eccentric and has a picky personality.

- Jeong Yu-mi as Eun Sol

A rookie prosecutor working in the 8th Eastern District. She was born into a wealthy family and possesses photographic memory. She is bright and warm-hearted, albeit a little clumsy.

- Park Eun-seok as Kang Hyun

An elite prosecutor who is Eun Sol's senior.

- Oh Man-seok as Do Ji-han

A chief prosecutor who newly transfers to the 8th Eastern District replacing Kang Hyun. He is experienced and clever.

- No Min-woo as Jang Chul / Dr. K (season 2)

He is a warm but quiet doctor who works at Hanju Hospital. He has Dissociative identity disorder (DID). His other identity is called Dr. K.

=== Supporting ===
==== People of National Forensic Service (NIS) ====
- Stephanie Lee as Stella Hwang (season 1)

A researcher and toxicologist at the National Forensic Service.

- Kang Seung-hyun as Sally (season 2)

A new toxicologist at the National Forensic Service who replaced Stella.

- Ko Kyu-pil as Jung Sung-joo

Forensic Investigator

- Noh Susanna as Han Soo-yeon

Forensic Investigator

- Joo Jin-mo as Park Joong-ho

Director of the National Institute of Forensic Sciences

- Song Young-kyu as Ma No-dam

Director of the Forensic Investigation Division

==== People of Seoul Eastern District Prosecutors' Office ====
- Park Jun-gyu as Kang Dong-sik

A sixth-grade civil servant. He used to be a violent crime detective for 15 years.

- Park Hee-jin as Cheon Mi-ho

An administrative assistant of Seoul Eastern District Prosecutors' Office.

- Kim Young-woong as Yang Soo-dong

An Investigator who works with Do Ji-han.

- Ahn Suk-hwan as No Han-shin

Chief Prosecutor of the criminal department of the Seoul Eastern District Prosecutors' Office.

- Kim Ho-jung as Oh Hwa-soo

Chief Judge of the Seoul Eastern District Court.

- Kim Min-ha as Park Mi-young

A prosecutor at Kang Hyun's office

- Baek Seung-hoon as Seo Jung-min

An Investigator who works with Kang Hyun.

==== People around Eun Sol ====
- Ko In-beom as Eun Ki-sang

Eun Sol's father

- Kim Seo-ra as Han Mi-mo

Eun Sol's mother

- Kang Sun-sook as Byeolgyo woman (벌교댁)

Eun Sol's housekeeper

- Heo Woong as Eun Ji-sung

Eun Sol's older brother

==== People around Baek Beom ====
- Choi Jong-ryul as Baek Ho-cheol

Baek Beom's father

==== Police ====
- Lee Yi-kyung as Cha Soo-ho

He is a chief detective, a police lieutenant, from Gangdong police station's violent crimes unit.

- Kim Ki-moo as Detective Park
- Min Pil-joon as Detective Kang

==== Others ====
- Kim Do-hyun as Oh Man-sang

A criminals who committed multiple crimes

- Hong Seo-jun as Yoon Tae-joon

Oh Man-sang's lawyer

- Yoon Sa-bong as Jang Hoo-nam

Jang Deuk-nam's older sister

- Yoo Yeon as Jo Hee-jin

Dong-woo's aunt, Han-soo's younger brother, Gil-ja's daughter

- Go Geon-han as Kim Joon-tae

Yeon Mi-rae's boyfriend

- Yoon Ji-min as Lee Hye-sung

Chief of Thoracic Surgery at Seon Hospital, Jang Deuk-nam's doctor and the criminal who killed Seo Jeong-min

- Ok Ye-rin as Han Seo-hyun - Su-yeon's daughter, a victim of child abuse in kindergarten

== Production ==
First script reading took place late March 2018 at MBC Dream Center in Ilsan, South Korea.

== Original soundtrack ==
=== Series 1 ===
==== Part 1 ====
Released on May 21, 2018
No.	Title	Lyrics	Music	Artist	Length
1.	"Can't Breathe"	Earattack, Jooheon	Earattack	Monsta X (Kihyun, Jooheon)	03:25
2.	"Can't Breathe (Inst.)"		Earattack		03:25
Total length:					06:50

==== Part 2 ====
Released on May 28, 2018
No.	Title	Lyrics	Music	Artist	Length
1.	"Truth"	Min Yeon-jae	1601	JK Kim Dong-wook	03:50
2.	"Truth (Eng. Ver.)"	Min Yeon-jae	1601	JK Kim Dong-wook	03:50
3.	"Truth (Inst.)"		1601		03:50
Total length:					11:30

==== Part 3 ====
Released on June 4, 2018
No.	Title	Lyrics	Music	Artist	Length
1.	"Walking" (걸어가)	Taeyunmi	Gaemi, Kim Se-jin	Minzy	03:31
2.	"Walking (Inst.)" (걸어가 (Inst.))		Gaemi, Kim Se-jin		03:31
Total length:					07:02

==== Part 4 ====
Released on June 12, 2018
No.	Title	Lyrics	Music	Artist	Length
1.	"It's Alright" (괜찮아)	Hana	Gaemi	Lee Seok-hoon	03:45
2.	"It's Alright (Inst.)" (괜찮아 (Inst.))		Gaemi		03:45
Total length:					07:30

==== Part 5 ====
Released on June 25, 2018
No.	Title	Lyrics	Music	Artist	Length
1.	"Sun Like A Star"	Gaemi, Heo Sung-jin, yuNdAk	Heo Sung-jin, Ha Hyung-joo	G.Urban, yuNdAk (OBROJECT)	03:20
2.	"Sun Like A Star (Inst.)"		Heo Sung-jin, Ha Hyung-joo		03:20
Total length:					06:40

==== Part 6 ====
Released on July 2, 2018
No.	Title	Lyrics	Music	Artist	Length
1.	"White Rain" (하얀비)	Gaemi, Hangzoo	Gaemi	Hangzoo, Stella Jang	03:35
2.	"White Rain (Inst.)" (하얀비 (Inst.))		Gaemi		03:35
Total length:					07:10

=== Series 2 ===
==== Part 1 ====
Released on June 25, 2019
No.	Title	Lyrics	Music	Artist	Length
1.	"Back on me"	Seol Gi-tae (설기태)	TEAM SNOW, Gaemi (개미)	Kim Yong-jin	03:03
2.	"Back on me (Inst.)"

==== Part 2 ====
Released on July 29, 2019
No.	Title	Lyrics	Music	Artist	Length
1.	"Dr. K (닥터K)"	Jeong Bom (정봄), KT Snow	Park Jeong-hwan (박정환), TEAM SNOW, Gaemi (개미)	No Min-woo	02:33
2.	"Dr. K (닥터K) (Inst.)"

==== Part 3 ====
Released on July 9, 2019
No.	Title	Lyrics	Music	Artist	Length
1.	"Poison"	MINUE	MINUE	I'll	03:28
2.	"Poison (Inst.)"

==== Part 4 ====
Released on July 16, 2019
No.	Title	Lyrics	Music	Artist	Length
1.	"Geu Iyu (그 이유)"	Seol Gi-tae (설기태), Hyeon Jeong (현정)	Gaemi (개미)	Lee Seok-hun (이석훈)	04:15
2.	"그 이유 (Inst.)"

==== Part 5 ====
Released on July 23, 2019
No.	Title	Lyrics	Music	Artist	Length
1.	"Neobakke moreugetta (너밖에 모르겠다)"	Park Gyeong-don (박경돈)	Park Gyeong-don	Lee Dong-wook (이동욱)	03:59
2.	"너밖에 모르겠다 (Inst.)"

== Ratings ==
- In the tables below, the blue numbers represent the lowest ratings and the red numbers represent the highest ratings.
- NR denotes that the drama did not rank in the top 20 daily programs on that date.
- TNmS stop publishing their report from June 2018.

=== Series 1 ===
Ep.	Original broadcast date	Average audience share			
Ep.	Original broadcast date	TNmS		AGB Nielsen	
Ep.	Original broadcast date	Nationwide	Seoul	Nationwide	Seoul
1	May 14, 2018	4.3% (NR)	4.4%	4.5% (NR)	4.7% (NR)
2	May 14, 2018	4.7% (NR)	4.8%	4.9% (NR)	5.1% (NR)
3	May 15, 2018	5.0% (NR)	5.2%	4.7% (NR)	5.3% (NR)
4	May 15, 2018	5.9% (NR)	6.3%	6.5% (13th)	7.8% (10th)
5	May 21, 2018	4.3% (NR)	4.5%	4.7% (NR)	4.9% (NR)
6	May 21, 2018	5.1% (NR)	5.3%	5.2% (NR)	5.4% (NR)
7	May 22, 2018	5.3% (NR)	5.5%	5.6% (NR)	5.8% (NR)
8	May 22, 2018	6.5% (17th)	6.7%	6.3% (17th)	6.5% (18th)
9	May 28, 2018	5.8% (NR)	6.6%	5.8% (20th)	6.5% (17th)
10	May 28, 2018	6.8% (20th)	7.0%	6.7% (16th)	6.9% (14th)
11	May 29, 2018	5.0% (NR)	5.8%	5.6% (18th)	6.4% (17th)
12	May 29, 2018	5.6% (NR)	6.3%	6.4% (15th)	7.1% (10th)
13	June 4, 2018	6.0%	6.8%	7.0% (13th)	7.7% (10th)
14	June 4, 2018	7.0%	7.9%	7.7% (8th)	8.5% (6th)
15	June 5, 2018	6.2%	6.5%	6.7% (10th)	7.2% (10th)
16	June 5, 2018	7.4%	7.6%	8.2% (5th)	8.4% (5th)
17	June 11, 2018	6.7%	7.0%	6.9% (16th)	7.1% (15th)
18	June 11, 2018	7.8%	7.9%	7.7% (7th)	
19	June 25, 2018 (Note: No episodes were aired on June 12 due to news coverage on the 2018 DPRK-US Singapore Summit, on June 18 due to live coverage of the 2018 FIFA World Cup Group F match between South Korea and Sweden, and on June 19 due to live coverage of the 2018 FIFA World Cup Group H match between Columbia and Japan.)	6.2%	6.8%	6.5% (19th)	7.3% (10th)
20	June 25, 2018	7.1%	7.6%	8.1% (7th)	8.5% (6th)
21	July 3, 2018 (Note: No episodes were aired on June 26 due to live coverage of the 2018 FIFA World Cup Group C match between Denmark and France, and on July 2 due to coverage of FIFA World Cup 2018 Round of 16 match between Brazil and Mexico. In return, four episodes were aired back-to-back on July 3.)	6.6%	7.1%	6.8% (17th)	7.3% (14th)
22	July 3, 2018	7.7%	7.9%	8.0% (10th)	8.3% (9th)
23	July 3, 2018	6.2%	6.3%	6.6% (20th)	
24	July 3, 2018	7.1%	7.4%	7.5% (13th)	7.8% (12th)
25	July 9, 2018	7.5%	8.1%	7.4% (15th)	8.0% (10th)
26	July 9, 2018	8.3%	8.5%	9.0% (6th)	9.0% (8th)
27	July 10, 2018	7.1%	7.8%	7.1% (13th)	7.9% (9th)
28	July 10, 2018	8.7%	9.3%	9.0% (5th)	9.6% (5th)
29	July 16, 2018	6.5%	6.6%	6.7% (15th)	6.9% (15th)
30	July 16, 2018	8.4%	8.7%	8.4% (6th)	8.5% (7th)
31	July 17, 2018	7.5%	8.0%	7.7% (8th)	8.2% (6th)
32	July 17, 2018	9.5%	10.2%	9.6% (5th)	10.3% (4th)
Average		6.6%	7.0%	6.7%	7.3%

=== Series 2 ===
Ep.	Original broadcast date	AGB Nielsen		TNmS
Ep.	Original broadcast date	Nationwide	Seoul Capital Area	Nationwide
1	2019/06/03	3.7%	N/A	4.0%
2	2019/06/03	5.7%	6.0%	5.7%
3	2019/06/04	4.1%	4.8%	N/A
4	2019/06/04	6.6%	7.8%	7.2%
5	2019/06/10	4.3%	N/A	N/A
6	2019/06/10	6.0%	6.5%	6.4%
7	2019/06/11	4.1%	4.9%	4.8%
8	2019/06/11	6.2%	6.7%	6.7%
9	2019/06/17	5.9%	6.5%	6.0%
10	2019/06/17	7.5%	8.4%	7.1%
11	2019/06/18	6.1%	7.0%	6.0%
12	2019/06/18	7.7%	8.6%	7.6%
13	2019/06/24	6.8%	7.7%	5.9%
14	2019/06/24	8.7%	9.8%	7.2%
15	2019/06/25	6.1%	6.5%	6.1%
16	2019/06/25	8.3%	9.1%	8.0%
17	2019/07/01	5.9%	6.4%	6.4%
18	2019/07/01	8.5%	9.3%	8.6%
19	2019/07/02	6.1%	6.7%	7.2%
20	2019/07/02	8.6%	9.4%	8.9%
21	2019/07/08	6.1%	6.6%	7.0%
22	2019/07/08	8.3%	8.8%	8.5%
23	2019/07/09	7.1%	8.0%	7.4%
24	2019/07/09	9.0%	9.8%	9.2%
25	2019/07/15	6.1%	6.7%	6.9%
26	2019/07/15	8.2%	8.8%	8.7%
27	2019/07/16	6.7%	7.4%	7.5%
28	2019/07/16	9.3%	9.4%	9.1%
29	2019/07/23	7.1%	7.6%	7.8%
30	2019/07/23	9.5%	10.1%	10.1%
31	2019/07/29	6.7%	7.2%	N/A
32	2019/07/29	9.9%	10.4%	N/A
Average		6.90%	－	－

== Awards and nominations ==
Year	Award	Category	Nominated work	Result	Ref.
2018	MBC Drama Awards	Grand Prize (Daesang)	Jung Jae-young	Nominated	
2018	MBC Drama Awards	Drama of the Year	Partners for Justice	Nominated	
2018	MBC Drama Awards	Top Excellence Award, Actor in a Monday-Tuesday Drama	Jung Jae-young	Won	
2018	MBC Drama Awards	Top Excellence Award, Actress in a Monday-Tuesday Drama	Jeong Yu-mi	Won	
2018	MBC Drama Awards	Excellence Award, Actor in a Monday-Tuesday Miniseries	Park Eun-seok	Nominated	
2018	MBC Drama Awards	Best Supporting Cast in Monday-Tuesday Miniseries	Park Jun-gyu	Nominated	

Year	Award	Category	Recipient	Result	Ref.
2019	32nd Grimae Awards	Best Actress	Jeong Yu-mi	Won	
2019	MBC Drama Awards	Drama of the Year	Partners for Justice (season 2)	Nominated	
2019	MBC Drama Awards	Top Excellence Award, Actor in a Monday-Tuesday Miniseries	Jung Jae-young	Nominated	
2019	MBC Drama Awards	Top Excellence Award, Actress in a Monday-Tuesday Miniseries	Jeong Yu-mi	Nominated	
2019	MBC Drama Awards	Excellence Award, Actor in a Monday-Tuesday Miniseries	Oh Man-seok	Won	
2019	MBC Drama Awards	Scene Stealer Award	No Min-woo	Won	
2019	MBC Drama Awards	Best Supporting Cast in Monday-Tuesday Miniseries	Ko Kyu-pil	Nominated	
2019	MBC Drama Awards	Best New Actress	Kang Seung-hyun	Nominated	
