= Park Hee-jin (actress) =

South Korean actress (born 1973)

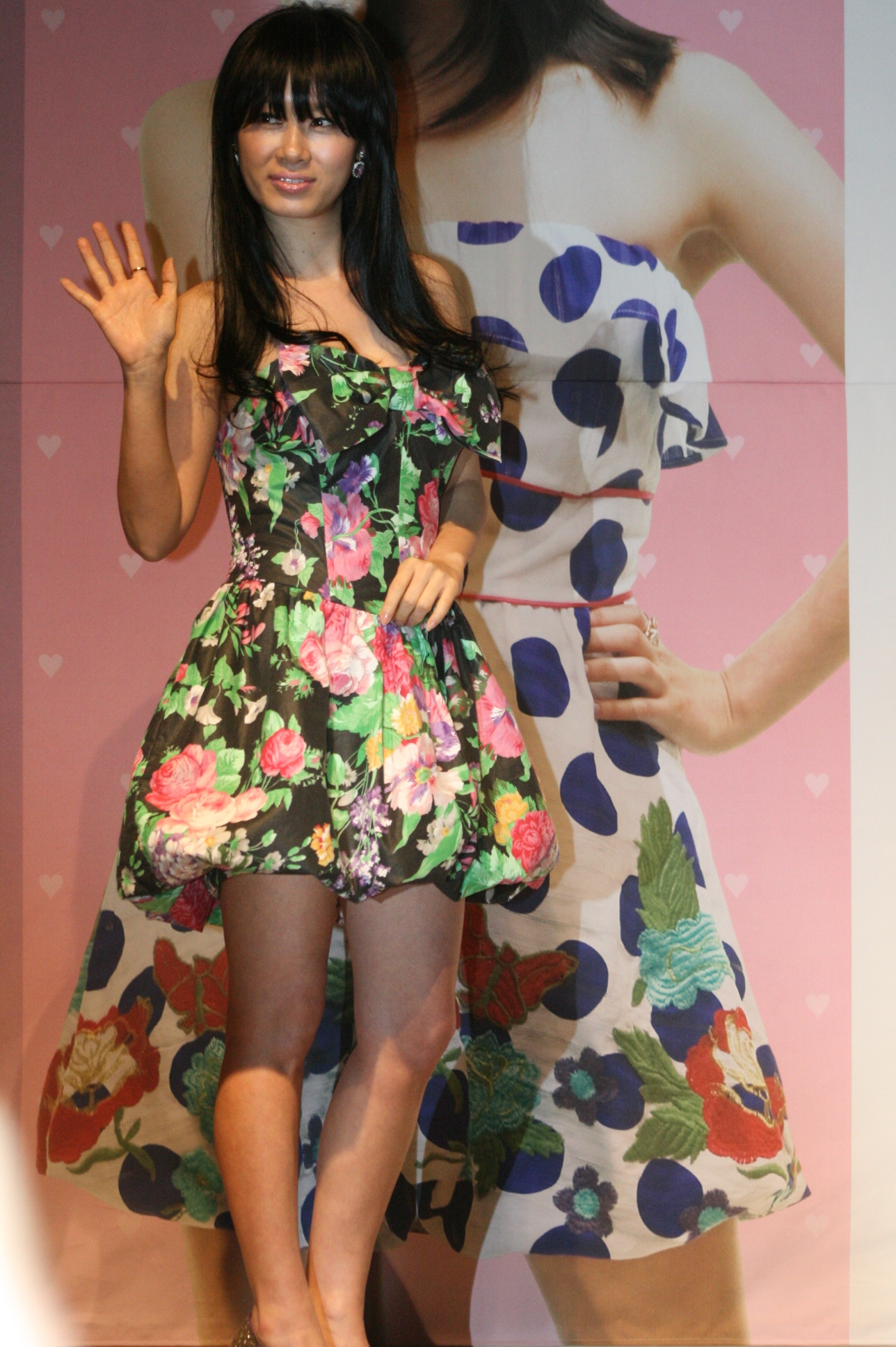
- Born: June 4, 1973 (age 53); Yangpyeong County, Gyeonggi Province, South Korea
- Other name: Bak Hui-jin
- Education: Seoul Institute of the Arts
- Years active: 1998–present
- Agent: SY Entertainment
- Known for: Partners for Justice; Sweet Revenge 2 Melting Me Softly

Korean name
- Hangul: 박희진
- RR: Bak Huijin
- MR: Pak Hŭijin

Park Hee-jin (Korean: 박희진; born June 4, 1973) is a South Korean actress, comedian, television host, and singer. She is known for her roles in the shows Partners for Justice, Sweet Revenge 2 and Melting Me Softly. She also did roles in the movies Marrying the Mafia II and Marrying the Mafia III.

== Life and career ==
Park Hee-jin is a South Korean actress born on June 4, 1973, in Gyeonggi Province, South Korea. She first made her debut as an actress in the movie A Promise in 1998. She then appeared in TV dramas such as Partners for Justice, Sweet Revenge 2 and Melting Me Softly. She also appeared in several movies, including Marrying the Mafia II, A Little Pond and Marrying the Mafia III.

== Filmography ==
=== Film ===
Year	Title	Role
1998	A Promise	Nurse Kim
1998	Naked Being	Yoon
2005	Marrying the Mafia II	Doctor
2006	Marrying the Mafia III	Doctor
2007	Magang Hotel	Shin Hui-jeong
2008	What Happened Last Night?	OB/GYN
2010	A Little Pond	Ji-ni
2011	Secrets, Objects	Kim Dae-pyo
2016	Boy Meets Girl	Woo-yeong's mom
2017	Behead the King	Cha-hyang
2017	Roman Holiday	Sung-ki's wife
2022	Immortal Vampire	Jo-in
2022	6/45	Female boss

=== Television ===
Key
†	Denotes television productions that have not yet been released

Year	Title	Role
2002	Orange	Herself
2002	Honest Living	Bak Hee-jin
2005	Hello Franceska	Park Hee-jin
2005	Rainbow Romance	Herself
2006	Spring Waltz	Kim Hee-jin
2006	Over the Rainbow	Ma Sun-young
2008	Love Marriage	Attorney Meong
2009	Romance Zero	Min-ha
2009	Style	Yoon Jung-hwa
2009	Tamra, the Island	Jong-dal
2010	The Miracle of Love	Hwang Geum-joo
2011	KBS Drama Special: "My Wife Disappeared"	Dong-jang
2011	You're So Beautiful	Go Man-hee
2011	High Kick: Revenge of the Short Legged	Ela mesma
2012	I Need a Fairy	Geum Bo-hwa
2013	The King's Daughter, Soo Baek-hyang	Yeo-ok
2013	Unemployed Romance	Chang-soo's mother
2014	You Are My Destiny	Prenatal class teacher, Baby store sales clerk, Interviewer
2014	Marriage, Not Dating	Gong Mi-jung
2015	Persevere, Goo Hae Ra	Heo Myeon-ran
2015	Heart to Heart	Talk show host
2015	Angry Mom	Kim Shin-ja
2015	You Will Love Me	Song-hye
2015	Sweet, Savage Family	Choi Gyung-mi
2016	Immortal Goddess	Jo-in
2017	Missing 9	Teacher
2017	Sisters-in-Law	Choi Soo-young
2018	Partners for Justice	Cheon Mi-ho
2018	Sweet Revenge 2	Kim Eun-hee
2019	Partners for Justice 2	Cheon Mi-ho
2019	Melting Me Softly	Park Kyung-ja
2022	Kill Heel	Noh Da-bi
2026	Francesca Next Door †	Ahn Seung-daek

== Album ==
- I Need a Fairy Part 3
- I Need a Fairy Part 5

== Awards and nominations ==
- 2000 MBC Comedy Awards Rookie Award
- 2003 Traffic Broadcasting MC Division Excellence Award
- 2005 41st Baeksang Arts Awards TV Female Entertainment Awards
- 2005 MBC Broadcasting Entertainment Awards, Comedy Sitcom Award,
- 2005 12th Korea Entertainment Art Awards, Comedy Award
- 2005 The 12th Korea Entertainment Art Awards
- 2005 32nd Korean Broadcasting Awards Comedian Individual Award
- 2005 MBC Broadcasting Entertainment Awards, Comedy/Sitcom Female Grand Prize
