= Mother's Garden =

- Promotional poster
- Also known as: Mom's Garden
- Genre: Family drama Romance; Melodrama
- Written by: Park Jung-ran
- Directed by: Noh Do-chul; Kwon Sung-chang
- Starring: Jeong Yu-mi; Choi Tae-joon; Uhm Hyun-kyung; Go Se-won
- Country of origin: South Korea
- Original language: Korean
- No. of episodes: 126

Production
- Executive producer: Choi Won-suk
- Producer: Oh Sung-min
- Running time: 35 minutes
- Production company: GnG Production

Original release
- Network: MBC
- Release: March 17 – September 18, 2014

Mother's Garden (Korean: 엄마의 정원; RR: Eommaui jeongwon) is a 2014 South Korean daily television drama starring Jeong Yu-mi, Choi Tae-Joon, Uhm Hyun-Kyung, Go Se-won and Go Doo-shim. It aired on MBC from March 17 to September 18, 2014, Monday through Friday at 20:50 for 126 episodes.

== Plot ==
Seo Yoon-Joo, the daughter of a family who owns a conglomerate, is a veterinarian who works specifically with horses. Yoon-Joo has a cheerful and straightforward personality, and she is in love with Cha Ki-Joon, the son of another rich family. Though Ki-Joon is a second-generation chaebol, he secretly dreams of becoming a chef.

== Cast ==
- Jeong Yu-mi as Seo Yoon-joo
- Choi Tae-joon as Cha Ki-joon
- Uhm Hyun-kyung as Kim Soo-jin
- Go Se-won as Cha Sung-joon
- Go Doo-shim as Jung Soon-jung
- Kil Yong-woo as Seo Byung-jin
- Na Young-hee as Yoo Ji-sun
- Yooyoung as Na Hye-rin
- Dan Woo as Seo Jong-ha
- Park Geun-hyung as Cha Dong-soo
- Kim Chang-sook as Oh Kyung-sook
- Choo So-young as Cha Bo-young
- Kim Bo-ra as Kim Soo-ah
- Jang Jung-hee as No-ra
- Gong Jung-hwan as Byun Tae-soo
- Lee El as Kim Ja-kyung
- Choi Seung-yoon as Joong Goo
- Kim Sa-kwon as Ha Dong-chang
- Min Do-hee as Ha Ri-ra (cameo)

== Awards and nominations ==
Year	Award	Category	Recipient	Result
2014	MBC Drama Awards	Top Excellence Award, Actress in a Serial Drama	Jeong Yu-mi	Nominated
2014	MBC Drama Awards	Best New Actor	Choi Tae-joon	Won
