= City Conquest =

- Genre: Romance; Action; Revenge
- Written by: Hwang Joo-ha
- Directed by: Yang Yun-ho
- Starring: Kim Hyun-joong; Jeong Yu-mi
- Country of origin: South Korea
- Original language: Korean

Production
- Executive producer: Baek Jin-dong
- Production locations: Japan; South Korea
- Production company: Media 100

City Conquest (Korean: 도시정벌; RR: Dosijeongbeol) was a cancelled South Korean television series.

== Overview ==
Adapted from the comic book of the same title by Shin Hyung-bin, the action series was originally budgeted at ₩4 billion. Starring Kim Hyun-joong, Jeong Yu-mi and Namkoong Min, it began filming in Japan in July 2012. Due to Kim's Korean Wave fanbase, international broadcasting rights were pre-sold to Japan, China, Hong Kong and Taiwan.

But in February 2013, prospective broadcaster KBS denied it a slot in their 2013 drama lineup, because network officials found the series "too violent" and its quality not up to their standards. Unable to secure a slot with the other two major channels in Korea, MBC and SBS, filming was halted and the project cancelled.

Japanese satellite/digital terrestrial channel DATV was one of the show's investors, and in July 2013, it aired the one-hour TV special City Conquest: Episode Zero, showing existing footage shot on location in Nikko, Utsunomiya and Kinugawa, as well as behind-the-scenes clips. The special was uploaded on YouTube and was also released on a Japan-only Blu-ray/DVD.

== Plot ==
A young man named Baek Mi-reu blames his father for abandoning him and his mother, which sets him on the path of revenge upon the evils of society.

== Cast ==
- Kim Hyun-joong - Baek Miru
- Jeong Yu-mi - Lee Dan-bi
- Namkoong Min - Cha Ji-ryong
- Kim Seung-woo - Baek Seung-hyun, Mi-reu's father
- Park Hyo-jun - Park Gwang-ya
- Kim Hee-won - Choi Yeong-soo
- Kim Young-ho - Cha Seong-gwang
- Choi Cheol-ho

== Production ==
City Conquest was supposed to be the second project of Baek Jin-dong's "Media 100" production company, after the 2012 TV Chosun drama Ji Woon-soo's Stroke of Luck.
