= Lee In-sung =

South Korean actor

- Born: July 28, 1996 (age 30); South Korea
- Occupation: Actor
- Years active: 2005–present

Korean name
- Hangul: 이인성
- RR: I Inseong
- MR: I Insŏng

Lee In-sung (born July 28, 1996) is a South Korean actor. He began his entertainment career as a child actor, notably in the comedy film Cracked Eggs and Noodles and the third season of sitcom Hello Franceska (both in 2005).

== Filmography ==
=== Film ===
Year	Title	Role
2005	Bungeoppang	
2005	Cracked Eggs and Noodles	Seo In-kwon
2006	Bambi II	Thumper (voice, Korean dubbed)
2006	Monopoly	Butcher boy
2009	City of Damnation	Min-seong (cameo)
2013	Fists of Legend	Leader of delinquents at Im Soo-bin's school

=== Television series ===
Year	Title	Role
2003	A Problem at My Younger Brother's House	Young-woo
2004	Jang Gil-san	Myo-ok's childhood friend
2005	Hello Franceska 3	In-sung
2006	Spring Waltz	Lee Kang-goo
2006	Drama City "Blockhead's Quadratic Equation"	Se-min
2007	My Mom! Super Mom!	Choi Gun
2007	Lee San, Wind of the Palace	young Jeong Hu-gyeom
2008	Hong Gil-dong	young Hong Gil-dong
2008	Last Scandal	Jang Hoon
2012	Love Again	Seo Min-jae
2013	Goddess of Fire	young Prince Imhae
2023	The Escape of the Seven	Han Joon-soo
