= Shim Hye-jin =

South Korean actress and model (born 1967)

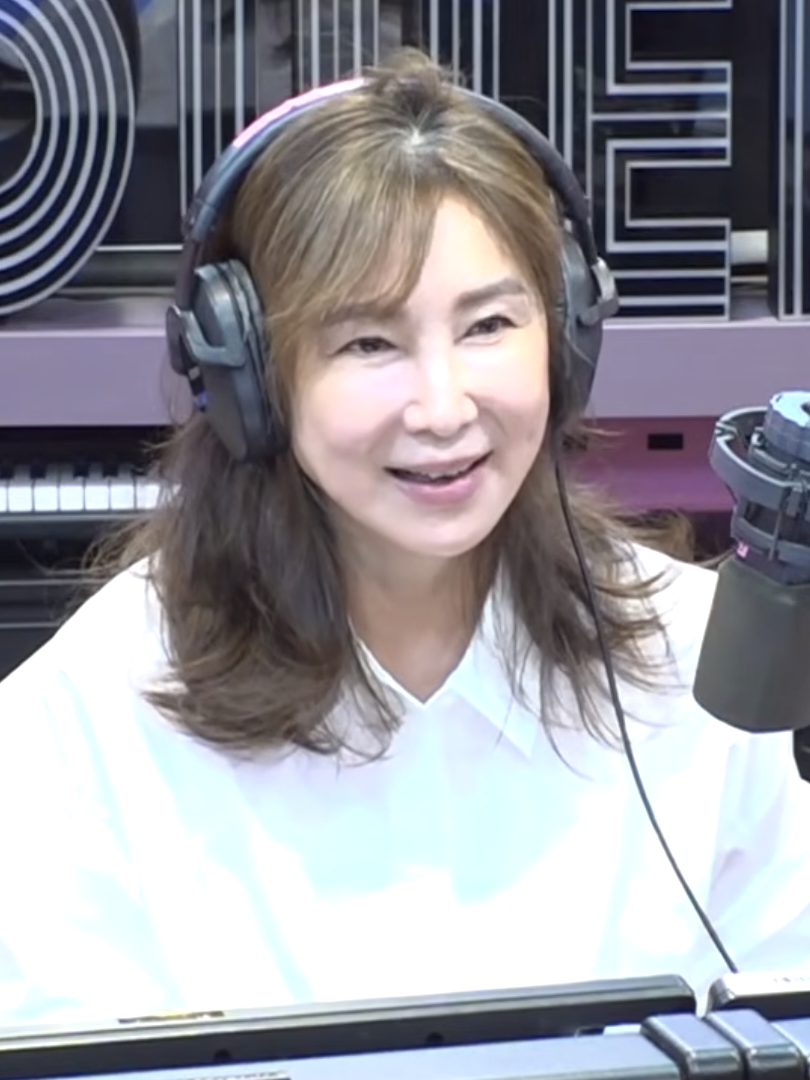
- Shim in May 2026
- Born: January 16, 1967 (age 59); Mapo District, Seoul, South Korea
- Occupations: Model; actress
- Years active: 1986–present
- Spouse: Han Sang-gu (m. 2007)

Korean name
- Hangul: 심상군
- Hanja: 沈常君
- RR: Sim Sanggun
- MR: Sim Sanggun

Stage name
- Hangul: 심혜진
- Hanja: 沈惠珍
- RR: Sim Hyejin
- MR: Sim Hyejin

Shim Hye-jin (Korean: 심혜진; born January 16, 1967) is a South Korean actress and model. She was one of the leading actresses of the 1990s in South Korea. Shim started her career as a model and achieved stardom with a Coca-Cola commercial in the late 1980s. Due to her appearance in the commercial, Shim was dubbed "Cola-like Woman."

== Filmography ==
=== Film ===
Year	Title	Role
1989	In the Name of Memory	Oh Yoo-kyung
1990	Black Republic	Song Young-sook
1992	White Badge	Sa-ra
1992	The Marriage Life	Choi Ji-hye
1993	Woman for Love, Woman for Marriage	Jin-hee
1995	Go Alone Like A Rhino's Horn	Kyung-hye
1996	The Gingko Bed	Son-young
1996	Cue	Hye Soo
1996	The adventure of Mrs. Park	Park Bong-gon
1997	Green Fish	Mi-ae
1997	Maria and the Inn	Myung-ja
1997	Man With Flowers	Jong-min
1998	Bedroom and Courtroom	Journalist
2003	Acacia	Choi Mi-sook
2006	Over the Border	Seo Kyung-joo
2008	Mother and Daughters	Park Nam-hee
2010	Foxy Festival	Ju Seon-shim
2012	Papa	cameo)
2014	Welcome	Hye-sook
2014	Daughter	Mom

=== Television series ===
Key
†	Denotes television productions that have not yet been released

Year	Title	Role
1993	The World is Mine	Kang Joon-hee
1997	Mr. Right	
1998	Blushing with Love	Min Young-sun
1999	Last War	Han Ji-soo
2000	Housewife's Rebellion	Jang Jin-gu
2004	Choice	Oh Jung-min
2004	Hello Franceska	Franceska
2005	That Woman	Yoon Ji-soo
2006	Princess Hours	Lady Seo Hwa-young
2006	Please Come Back, Soon-Ae	Huh Soon-ae
2007	My Mom! Super Mom!	Ko Min-joo
2008	East of Eden	Young-ran's mother
2009	Empress Cheonchu	Empress Xiao
2009	Jolly Widows	Ha Yoon-jung
2010	Stormy Lovers	Hong Na-rim
2012	I Need a Fairy	Queen Mother
2012	Happy Ending	Yang Sun-ah
2013	A Tale of Two Sisters	Kim Joo-hee
2014	Secret Affair	Han Seong-sook
2014	Endless Love	Min Hye-rin
2014	My Spring Days	Jo Myung-hee
2015	Kill Me, Heal Me	Shin Hwa-ran
2015	The Return of Hwang Geum-bok	Baek Ri-hyang
2015	Late Night Restaurant	Eun-soo (ep 2)
2017	Strong Girl Bong-soon	Hwang Jin-yi
2018	Sunny Again Tomorrow	Yoon Jin-hee
2018	The Undateables	Ko Eun-nim
2021–2022	Love Twist	Maeng Ok-hee
2026	Between Steps	Hong Eun-joo
2026	Francesca Next Door †	Franceska

== Variety show ==
- 2015: Brave Family Ep. 1–10 (KBS, 2015)

== Accolades ==
=== Awards and nominations ===
Year	Award	Category	Nominated work	Result	Ref.
1990	11th Three Continents Festival	Best Actress	Black Republic	Won	
1990	1st Chunsa Film Art Awards	Best Actress	Black Republic	Won	
1991	27th Baeksang Arts Awards	Favorite Film Actress	—N/a	Won	
1992	13th Blue Dragon Film Awards	Popular Star Award	—N/a	Won	
1993	13th Korean Association of Film Critics Awards	Best Actress	Marriage Story	Won	
1993	31st Grand Bell Awards	Best Actress	Marriage Story	Won	
1993	31st Grand Bell Awards	Best Supporting Actress	White Badge	Nominated	
1994	5th Chunsa Film Art Awards	Best Actress	Out to the World	Won	
1994	15th Blue Dragon Film Awards	Best Leading Actress	Out to the World	Nominated	
1994	15th Blue Dragon Film Awards	Popular Star Award	Out to the World	Won	
1995	33rd Grand Bell Awards	Best Actress	Out to the World	Nominated	
1996	7th Women Viewers Film Awards	Best Actress	The Gingko Bed	Won	
1996	34th Grand Bell Awards	Best Actress	The Gingko Bed	Won	
1996	34th Grand Bell Awards	Best Actress	Go Alone Like A Rhino's Horn	Nominated	
1996	32nd Baeksang Arts Awards	Best Actress	Go Alone Like A Rhino's Horn	Won	
1996	17th Blue Dragon Film Awards	Best Leading Actress	The Adventures of Mrs Park	Won	
1996	17th Blue Dragon Film Awards	Popular Star Award	The Adventures of Mrs Park	Won	
1997	35th Grand Bell Awards	Best Actrees	Green Fish	Won	
1997	35th Grand Bell Awards	Favorite Actress	Green Fish	Won	
1997	20th Golden Cinematography Awards	Favorite Actress	Green Fish	Won	
1997	33rd Baeksang Arts Awards	Best Actress	Green Fish	Won	
1997	18th Blue Dragon Film Awards	Best Leading Actress	Green Fish	Nominated	
1998	19th Blue Dragon Film Awards	Best Leading Actress	Bedroom And Courtroom	Nominated	
1999	MBC Drama Awards	Favorite Actrees	—N/a	Won	
2005	MBC Entertainment Awards	Special Award	—N/a	Won	
2006	SBS Drama Awards	Excellence Award, Actrees in a Drama Special	Please Come Back, Soon-ae	Won	
2006	SBS Drama Awards	Top 10 Stars Award	Please Come Back, Soon-ae	Won	
2007	44th Grand Bell Awards	Best Supporting Actress	Over the Border	Won	
2011	20th Buil Film Awards	Best Supporting Actress	Foxy Festival	Nominated	

=== Jury ===
- In 2022, she was selected as jury member for Bucheon Choice: Features section at 26th Bucheon International Fantastic Film Festival.
