= Cracked Eggs and Noodles =

- Theatrical poster
- Hangul: 파송송 계란탁
- Hanja: 파송송 鷄卵탁
- RR: Pasongsong gyerantak
- MR: P'asongsong kyerant'ak
- Directed by: Oh Sang-hoon
- Written by: Lee Hyun-sue
- Produced by: Kim Jeong-su
- Starring: Im Chang-jung; Lee In-sung
- Cinematography: Lee Suck-hyun
- Edited by: Kyung Min-ho
- Music by: Jo Seong-woo; Jeong Se-rin
- Distributed by: CJ Entertainment
- Release date: February 18, 2005
- Running time: 120 minutes
- Country: South Korea
- Language: Korean
- Box office: US$6,562,975

Cracked Eggs and Noodles (Korean: 파송송 계란탁; RR: Pasongsong gyerantak) is a 2005 South Korean comedy film. It received 1,193,150 admissions nationwide during its theatrical release.

It was also one of four Korean movies that screened at the 2006 International Fajr Film Festival in Iran.

== Plot ==
Dae-gyu is a working man living a stress-free dating life until one day a young boy claiming to be his son pays him an unexpected visit. After much wavering and struggle to make his son go away, Dae-gyu makes a compromise to go on a road trip after which he would return the boy to his mother.
