= Jeong Yu-mi (actress, born 1984) =

South Korean actress (born 1984)

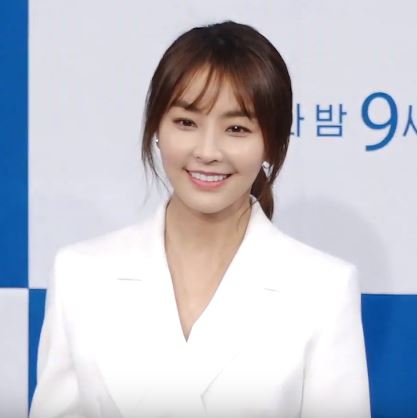
- Jeong in June 2019
- Born: February 23, 1984 (age 42); Busan, South Korea
- Education: Hanyang University
- Occupation: Actress
- Years active: 2003–present
- Agent: Mystic Story

Korean name
- Hangul: 정유미
- Hanja: 鄭柔美
- RR: Jeong Yumi
- MR: Chŏng Yumi

Jeong Yu-mi (Korean: 정유미; born February 23, 1984) is a South Korean actress. She is best known for starring in Rooftop Prince, Six Flying Dragons, and Partners for Justice.

== Career ==
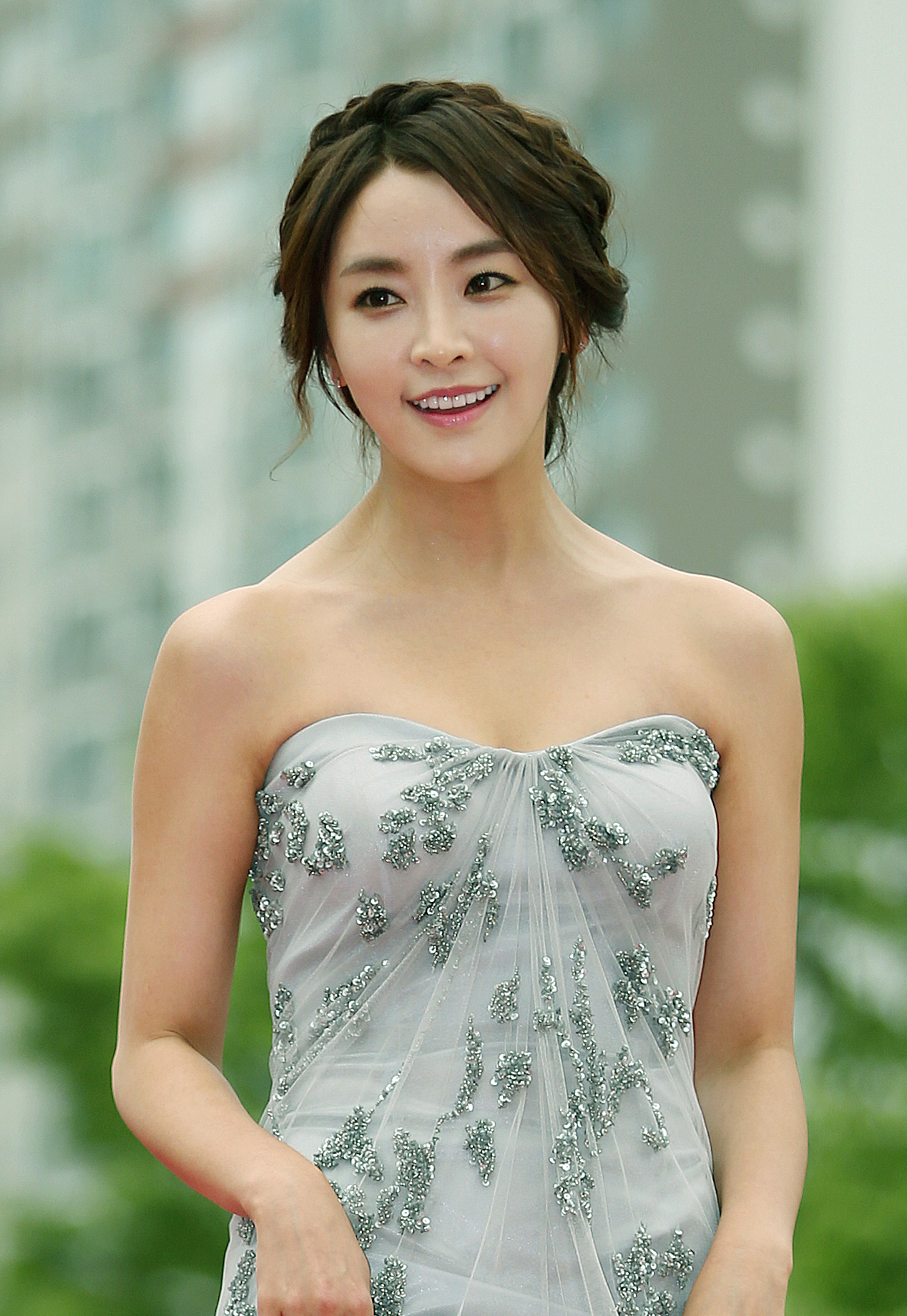
Jeong at the BiFan Film Festival in 2014

Jeong Yu-mi made her entertainment debut in a Lotte Xylitol chewing gum commercial in 2003. After playing minor roles in several TV series and movies, she became a household name when she portrayed a gentle girlfriend in A Thousand Days' Promise (2011) and a scheming secretary in Rooftop Prince (2012).

Having previously appeared in the Chinese drama Five Star Hotel (2007), Jeong starred opposite Leon Lai and Gao Yuanyuan in the Chinese film Nobleman's Path (2012).

She was cast in the revenge manhwa-turned-TV series City Conquest, but the project was eventually cancelled after it couldn't secure a timeslot. Instead, Jeong starred in the family drama Wonderful Mama (2013) in her first leading role.

In September 2013, she joined the season 4 cast of dating reality show We Got Married, where she was paired with singer Jung Joon-young. She later appeared in the music video for Jung's single "The Sense of an Ending". The same year, she was cast in her first big screen leading role for the horror film Tunnel 3D.

Jeong next headlined the daily drama Mother's Garden (2014) and period drama More Than a Maid (2015). She then took on a supporting role in the historical drama Six Flying Dragons.

In 2016, Jung was cast as the female lead in revenge drama The Master of Revenge. In 2017, she headlined the weekend drama Bravo My Life.

In 2018, Jung was cast in the crime drama Partners for Justice as a rookie prosecutor. She next starred in the medical exorcism drama Priest.

In July 2021, Jung signed a contract with Mystic Story.

== Personal life ==
On February 4, 2020, it was confirmed that Jung is in a relationship with singer Kangta.

== Filmography ==
=== Film ===
| Year | Title | Role | Notes | Ref. |
|---|---|---|---|---|
| 2002 | Are You Seeing Anyone? | Yu-mi | short film | |
| 2003 | Singles | Hee-jung | | |
| 2003 | The Greatest Expectation | Interviewee 2 | | |
| 2003 | Silmido | High school girl on the bus | | |
| 2004 | The Doll Master | Woman in kimono | | |
| 2005 | The Secret within Her Mask | Jeong | short film | |
| 2005 | Wet Dreams 2 | Class president | | |
| 2005 | Innocent Steps | Oh Mi-soo | | |
| 2005 | Cello | | | |
| 2007 | The Phantom Sonata | | short film | |
| 2007 | Hwang Jin Yi | Yi-geum | | |
| 2007 | Someone Behind You | Lee Myung-hee | | |
| 2011 | You're My Pet | Lee Young-eun | | |
| 2012 | Wonderful Radio | Nan-sol | | |
| 2012 | Nobleman's Path | Mun-wan | Chinese film | |
| 2014 | The Tunnel | Eun-joo | | |
| 2022 | Birth | Park Hee-sun | | |
| TBA | The Choice: A Story of the Old Shanghai | | Chinese film; unreleased | |

=== Television series ===
| Year | Title | Role | Notes | Ref. |
|---|---|---|---|---|
| 2004 | Terms of Endearment | Maeng Han-ji | | |
| 2004 | Heaven's Fate | Kim Hye-bin | | |
| 2007 | Five Star Hotel | Kim Ji-ae | | |
| 2008 | The Great King, Sejong | Da-yeon | | |
| 2008 | Painter of the Wind | | | |
| 2009 | Friend, Our Legend | Min Eun-ji | | |
| 2009 | Assorted Gems | Lee Kang-ji | | |
| 2010 | Dong Yi | Jung eum | | |
| 2011 | A Thousand Days' Promise | Noh Hyang-gi | | |
| 2012 | Rooftop Prince | Hong Se-na / Hwa-yong | | |
| 2013 | Wonderful Mama | Go Young-chae | | |
| 2014 | Mother's Garden | Seo Yoon-joo | | |
| 2015 | More Than a Maid | Guk In-yeob | | |
| 2015 | Six Flying Dragons | Yeon-hee | | |
| 2016 | The Master of Revenge | Chae Yeo-kyung | | |
| 2016 | The Legend of the Blue Sea | Kim Hye-jin | Cameo (episode 8) | |
| 2017 | Bravo My Life | Ha Do-na | | |
| 2018 | Partners for Justice | Eun Sol | | |
| 2018 | Priest | Ham Eun-ho | | |
| 2019 | Partners for Justice 2 | Eun Sol | | |
| 2023 | Strangers Again | Na Soo-yeon | Cameo (episode 1) | |

=== Web series ===
| Year | Title | Role | Ref. |
|---|---|---|---|
| 2023 | Celebrity | Hwang Yu-ri | |
| 2024 | Queen Woo | Woo-soon | |

=== Television shows ===
| Year | Title | Notes | Ref. |
|---|---|---|---|
| 2013–2014 | We Got Married - Season 4 | Cast member paired with Jung Joon-young (episodes 55–89) | |
| 2019 | Mirage Restaurant | Cast member | |
| 2021 | Night with OPAL | Cast Member | |
| 2023 | Look at Me+ | Host with Kim Sung-eun | |

=== Radio show ===
| Year | Title | Notes | Ref. |
|---|---|---|---|
| 2016–2018 | Jeong Yu-mi's FM Date | 10th host in program history | |

=== Music video appearances ===
| Year | Song title | Artist | Ref. |
|---|---|---|---|
| 2006 | "Not You, But Your Sister" | EZ-Life | |
| 2011 | "Girlfriend" | Jay Park | |
| 2013 | "The Sense of an Ending" | Jung Joon-young | |
| 2016 | "UUU" | Jung-in | |

== Awards and nominations ==
Name of the award ceremony, year presented, category, nominee of the award, and the result of the nomination
| Award ceremony | Year | Category | Nominee / Work | Result | Ref. |
|---|---|---|---|---|---|
| APAN Star Awards | 2016 | Excellence Award, Actress in a Serial Drama | Six Flying Dragons | Won | |
| Grimae Awards | 2019 | Best Actress | Partners for Justice 2 | Won | |
| KBS Drama Awards | 2016 | Excellence Award, Actress in a Mid-length Drama | The Master of Revenge | Nominated | |
| MBC Drama Awards | 2014 | Top Excellence Award, Actress in a Serial Drama | Mother's Garden | Nominated | |
| MBC Drama Awards | 2018 | Top Excellence Award, Actress in a Monday-Tuesday Drama | Partners for Justice | Won | |
| MBC Drama Awards | 2019 | Top Excellence Award, Actress in a Monday-Tuesday Miniseries | Partners for Justice 2 | Nominated | |
| MBC Entertainment Awards | 2013 | Best Newcomer Award for Variety Show | We Got Married | Won | |
| MBC Entertainment Awards | 2017 | Rookie Award, Radio Category | Jeong Yu-mi's FM Date | Won | |
| MBC Entertainment Awards | 2020 | Excellence Award in Variety Category (Female) | Those Who Cross the Line | Nominated | |
| SBS Drama Awards | 2011 | New Star Award | A Thousand Days' Promise | Won | |
| SBS Drama Awards | 2011 | Excellence Award, Actress in a Special Planning Drama | A Thousand Days' Promise | Nominated | |
| SBS Drama Awards | 2012 | Excellence Award, Actress in a Drama Special | Rooftop Prince | Won | |
| SBS Drama Awards | 2013 | Excellence Award, Actress in a Weekend/Daily Drama | Wonderful Mama | Nominated | |
| SBS Drama Awards | 2015 | Special Award, Actress in a Serial Drama | Six Flying Dragons | Nominated | |
| SBS Drama Awards | 2017 | Excellence Award, Actress in a Daily/Weekend Drama | Bravo My Life | Nominated | |
| Seoul Global Movie Awards | 2024 | Special Award for OTT | Queen Woo | Won | |
