= Kang Seung-hyun =

South Korean model

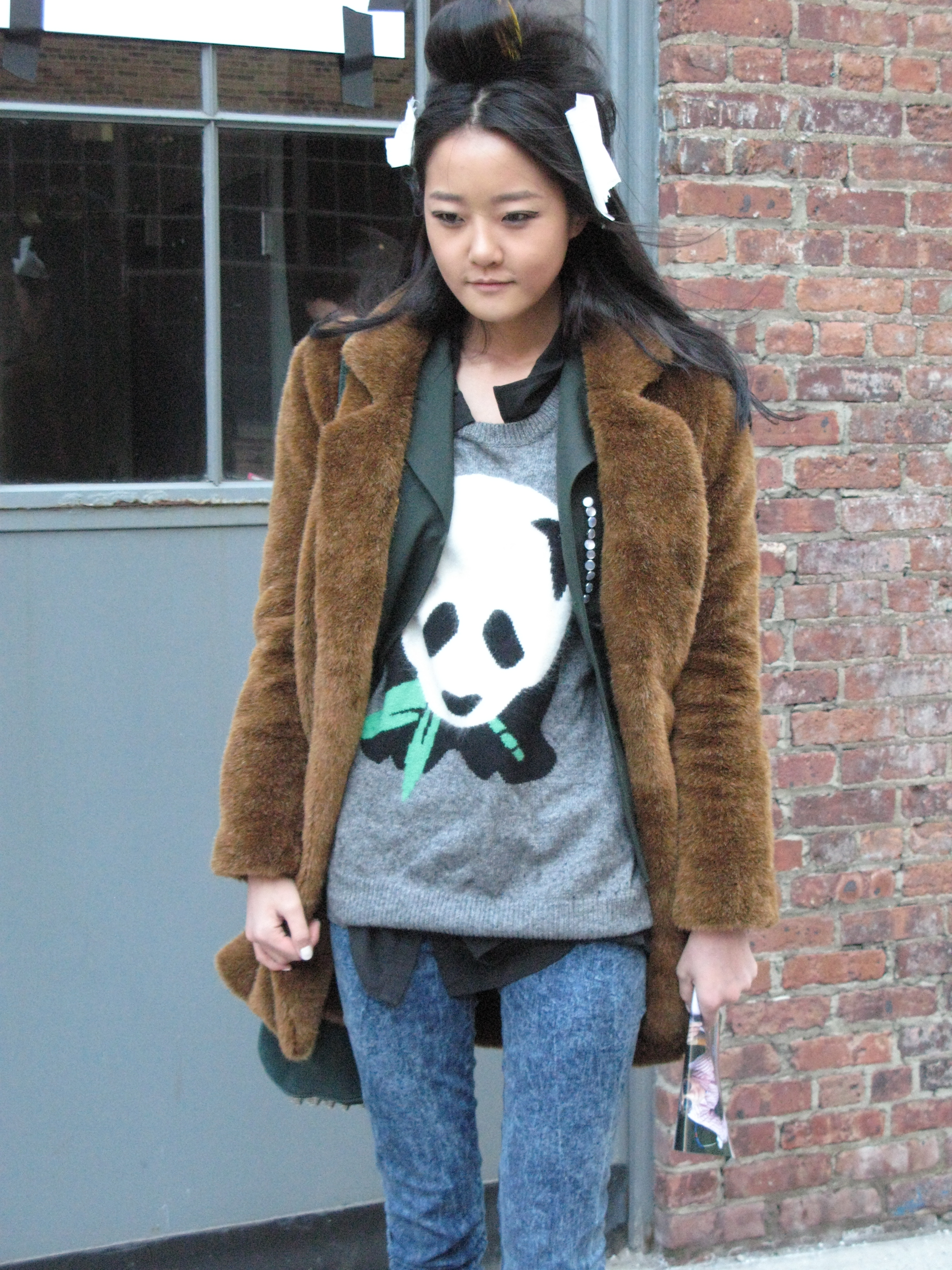
- Kang in 2011
- Born: 22 September 1987 (age 39); Seoul, South Korea
- Other name: Hyoni Kang
- Years active: 2008–present
- Modeling information
- Height: 1.78 m (5 ft 10 in)
- Hair color: Black
- Eye color: Dark brown
- Agency: Ford Models (New York); YGKPlus (Seoul)

Kang Seung-hyun (born 22 September 1987), commonly known as Hyoni Kang, is a South Korean model who won Ford's Model of the World title in 2008 at the age of 19. She is the first Asian model to win this award.

== Career ==
=== Model ===
Kang officially debuted as a model as she opened the fall 3.1 Phillip Lim in New York City in February 2008. In September 2008, she opened the spring Trovata show and closed the spring Nanette Lepore show in New York. She also walked for 3.1 Phillip Lim, DKNY, Halston, and Michael Kors. In February 2009, Kang walked the fall 3.1 Phillip Lim, Badgley Mischka, Tory Burch, Roksanda Ilincic, and House of Holland shows in New York and London. In February 2010, Kang opened the fall Maria Cornejo and Osman Yousefzada shows in New York and London, and she also closed for Karen Walker and Amanda Wakeley.

Not only did Kang walked on runways, she also had many photo shoots for world-famous magazines. In April 2008, Kang was featured on first major cover of the South Korean edition of Vogue. In July of the same year, she appeared in V editorial, styled in Gucci. A month later in August, Kang appeared in a Teen Vogue editorial. In July 2010, she appeared in Marie Claire editorial. And in March, September, and October 2011, Kang appeared in Vogue China.

In September 2014, Kang signed a contract with YG KPLUS.

=== CEO ===
Kang launched a vintage fashion brand called Reborn Process in December 2009. She started the business with Yoon Ae-ri, a stylist whom Kang got to know at Ford Modeling competition, and Lee Jun-yeop, a photographer and film maker. Instead of showcasing few collections before opening a boutique, Kang first opened her store and started working on the collection after Reborn Process became renowned. Kang redesigns and remakes new pieces with items thrifted mainly from Los Angeles, San Diego, and New York to fit today's style and taste. She wishes to make her collection "one of a kind" and wants Reborn Process to develop into a multi brand shop. Her boutique is located in SoHo, New York.

=== Designer ===
Kang collaborated with a South Korean fashion brand called Love Cat. She designed bags under Hyoni-line while she traveled back and forth from New York to Seoul, South Korea. This limited edition bag, which was released in September 2011, was popular as a 'must have it item' because of its chic and romantic design as well as its practical aspect in which one can either adjust the straps to different lengths, use another chain strap that comes with the bag, or even take all the straps off and use the bag as a clutch.

In April 2013, it was announced that Kang would collaborate with a South Korean fashion brand called Lapalette to create a special line of handbags. Bags designed by Kang were scheduled to be released in June 2013. Kang's new line was made available for purchase through Lapalette's website.

=== Director ===
Hyoni TV is a fashion film that started in May 2012, written, directed, produced, and hosted by Kang. Hyoni TV was shot in New York and Hyoni explained New Yorker's style and gave styling tips. In her film, Kang also introduced famous fashion people such as Eva Chen, Teen Vogue editor, and Shu Pei Quin, a model.

=== TV show host ===
Kang was featured in a South Korean fashion TV show, Get It Style, as a main host. This program that aimed to become "the Style Bible" was first aired on 7 February 2013. It was originally designed to have only four episodes; however, due to its popularity, the directors extended the show to have six additional episodes. In Get It Style, Kang not only simply stated the general fashion trend of what is in and what is out today, but also introduced items that fits different individual's style and how to style accordingly to different occasions. She also gave advice on how to utilize one's currently owned item and shop wisely.

=== Other TV appearances ===
Before hosting the show Get It Style, Kang appeared in TV few times. She was MC for a show called Trend Report Feel season 6 (In New York) and appeared in an episode of Korean reality TV show, Muhan Dojeon, also known as Infinite Challenge, on 5 December 2009. Kang was also featured in Munhwa Broadcasting Corporation's Never Ending Story and Korean Broadcasting System's Global Success Time Period of Kang Seung-Hyun episode. In July 2014, she appeared on the world-famous SBS's Running Man (TV series).

== Filmography ==
=== Television ===
Year	Title	Role	Network	Notes
2015	We Broke Up	Yoon Ni-na	CJ E&M Web-Drama	2nd Lead Role
2015	High Society	Beauty&Beauty MC	SBS	Cameo (Episode 15)
2019	Partners for Justice 2	Sally	MBC TV	
2020	My Holo Love	Yoo-ram	Netflix	

=== Variety show ===
Year	Title	Role	Network
2015	Beauty Bible 2015 S/S	MC	KBS
2016	Battle Trip	Contestant with Sandara Park (Ep. 19–20)	KBS2
2017	Battle Trip	Contestant with Sandara Park (Ep 33–34)	KBS2
