= The Tunnel (2014 film) =

2014 South Korean horror film directed by Park Gyu-taek

- Theatrical poster
- Directed by: Park Gyu-taek
- Written by: Yu Se-mun
- Produced by: Han Man-taek; Kwon Jun-hyeong
- Starring: Jeong Yu-mi; Yeon Woo-jin; Song Jae-rim; Jeong Si-yeon; Lee Si-won
- Cinematography: Yu Jae-eung
- Edited by: Moon In-dae
- Music by: Han Jae-kwon
- Distributed by: BoXoo Entertainment
- Release date: August 13, 2014
- Running time: 86 minutes
- Country: South Korea
- Language: Korean

The Tunnel (Korean: 터널 3D; RR: Teoneol 3D; lit. 'Tunnel 3D') is a 2014 South Korean horror film directed by Park Gyu-taek.

== Plot ==
A group of friends are invited to the launch party of a luxury resort. A strange man barges in, and scares everyone away by declaring that they will all be killed by a curse. They return to the resort to find the strange man watching them, and accidentally end up killing him. They decide to dispose of the body in a coal mine, but get trapped inside the dark tunnels facing the buried horrors within.

== Cast ==
- Jeong Yu-mi as Eun-joo
- Yeon Woo-jin as Dong-jun
- Song Jae-rim as Ki-cheol
- Jeong Si-yeon as Se-hee
- Lee Si-won as Yoo-kyung
- Son Byong-ho as Mr. Kim
- Lee Jae-hee as Young-min
- Ham Sung-min as Small boy
- Min Do-hee as Girl
- Bae Woo-hee as Hye-young
