= Hong Ri-na =

South Korean actress (born 1968)

- Born: February 7, 1968 (age 58); Seoul, South Korea
- Occupation: Actress
- Years active: 1990–2004
- Known for: Jewel in the Palace

Korean name
- Hangul: 홍리나
- RR: Hong Rina
- MR: Hong Rina

Hong Ri-na (Korean: 홍리나; born February 7, 1968) is a South Korean actress, perhaps best known for playing Choi Geum-young in the popular TV series Jewel in the Palace.

== Television series ==
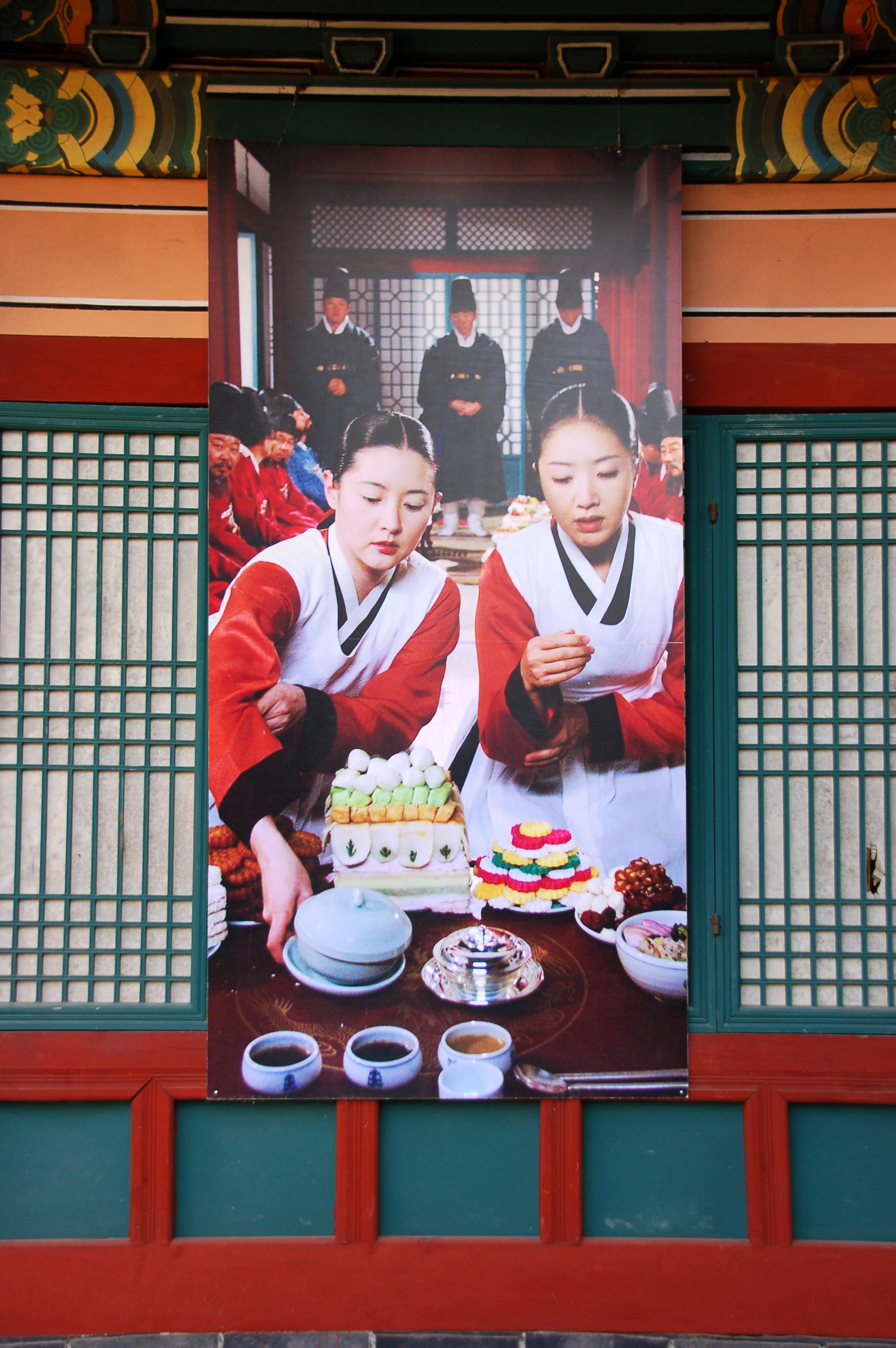
Still of Hong as Choi Geum-young (right) and Lee Young-ae as Seo Jang-geum (left) on display at the Dae Jang Geum Theme Park.

- Three Wives (SBS, 2004)
- Jewel in the Palace (MBC, 2003)
- Honest Living (SBS, 2002)
- The Dawn of the Empire (KBS1, 2002)
- Still Love (SBS, 2001)
- Sister's Mirror (2000)
- Blue Classroom
- The Great King's Road (MBC, 1998)
- Mountain (MBC, 1997)
- Mimang (MBC, 1996)
- Jo Gwang-jo (KBS2, 1996)
- My Son's Woman (MBC, 1994)
- General Hospital (MBC, 1994)
- Sisters
- The Sun and the Moon (KBS, 1993)
- Mystery Melodrama: Dangerous Choice (KBS, 1993)
- Son-ja's Tactics (KBS, 1992)
- Two Ladies (MBC, 1992)
- Husband's Woman (KBS, 1992)
- Loving You (SBS, 1992)
- Tide of Ambition (KBS, 1991)
- Rainbow General (KBS, 1991)
- Guest in Autumn (KBS, 1990)
- My Mother's Life in Disguise (MBC, 1990)
