= Gungnyeo =

Palace women in pre-modern Korea

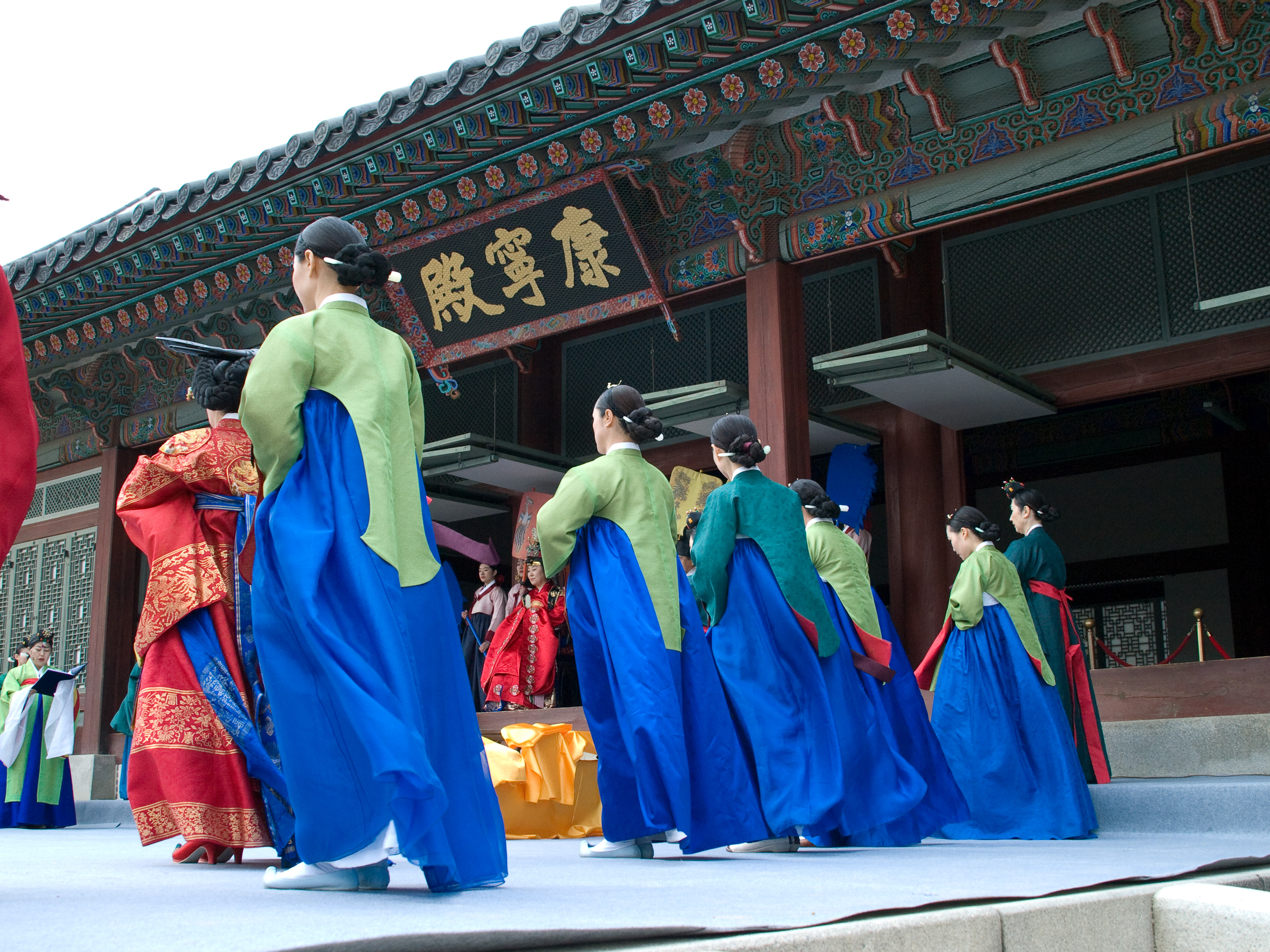
- Kungnyŏ in green dangui and blue chima during a historical reenactment

Korean name
- Hangul: 궁녀
- Hanja: 宮女
- RR: gungnyeo
- MR: kungnyŏ

Kungnyŏ (Korean: 궁녀; Hanja: 宮女; lit. ''palace women'') is a Korean term referring to women working in the palace during the Joseon period. It is short for "gungjung yeogwan", which translates as "lady official of the royal court". Kungnyŏ included sanggung (palace matron) and nain (palace maids), both of whom held rank as officials. The term is also used more broadly to encompass palace women without a rank such as musuri (lowest maids in charge of odd chores), gaksimi, sonnim, uinyeo (female physicians), besides nain and sanggung.

== Establishment ==
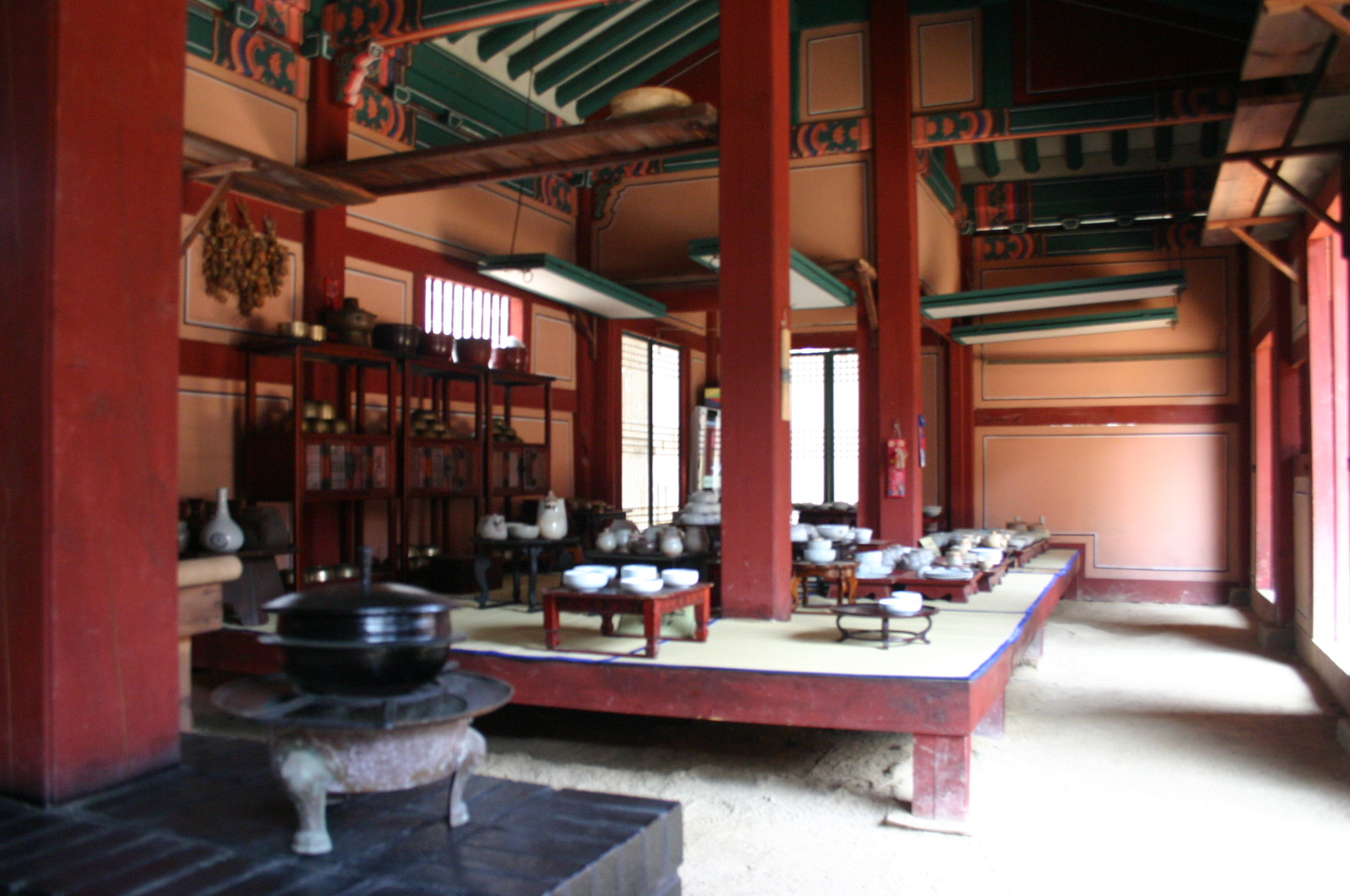
In the Dae Jang Geum Theme Park, a model of the royal kitchen in which kungnyŏ worked is displayed.

Although the first record of kungnyŏ appears in Goryeosa, a compilation on the history of Goryeo, a provision was first made in 1392 by King Taejo per Jo Jun (趙浚) and other officers' suggestions after the establishment of the Joseon Dynasty. In 1428 Sejong the Great set up a detailed system regulating kungnyŏ, in which female officers were divided into naegwan (internal offices, concerned with the royal court) and gunggwan (palace officers), and defined their ranks, titles, and social status. He further institutionalized the system, with revisions, in the Gyeongguk daejeon (Complete Code of Laws).

The kungnyŏ were not clearly defined during the Goryeo period, and it is not known how they came to serve the court and what procedures applied to them. The use of the term during that period is therefore assumed to refer to all women in the king's service in the court. In documents related to Goryeo, the social status of kungnyŏ was generally commoner or lower class, such as the daughters of slaves, concubines, or cheonmin (the despised). In the 22nd year of King Uijong kungnyŏ roles were divided into sanggung (尙宮, managing the palace), sangchim (尙寢, managing bedding), sangsik (尙食 managing food), and another type of sangchim (尙針, managing sewing). Female musicians called yeoak were also a part of the kungnyŏ.

During the Joseon Dynasty, court life was centered on the King, so many court women were necessary. They were assigned to the Daejeon (大殿; the Great Hall), Naejeon (內殿, private inner royal hall), the Daebijeon (the Queen dowager's quarter), or the Sejajeon (the crown prince's quarter) of the palace.

== Election and education ==
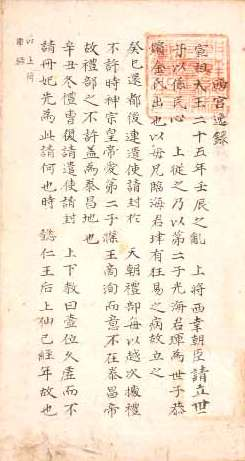
Gyechuk ilgi, Diary of 1613

The appointment of kungnyŏ usually occurred one year in ten, but there were exceptions; the method of appointing kungnyŏ and their social status differed from time to time, so the process was not systematized. In general, kungnyŏ were chosen from among female slaves who belonged to the governing class rather than from daughters of the sangmin (common people in rank). However, if circumstances allowed, people around the king wanted to pick kungnyŏ from commoners' children, using a custom of early marriage in households that had a daughter over ten years old. As a result, since King Gyeongjong's reign, daughters from the lower class were prohibited to be appointed as kungnyŏ. According to the Sokdaejeon (Supplement to the National Code), some female slaves of each government office were chosen to become kungnyŏ since the reign of King Yeongjo.

While this restriction on class applied to "common kungnyŏ", the appointment of those in important roles, closely waiting on the king and queen, such as jimil nain, was different. The standard for choosing jimil nain was so high that sanggung tended to go out recruiting candidates through personal connections and by family custom. There were many kungnyŏ in service who recommended their relatives for the position. The social status of the kungnyŏ who were assigned to jimil, chimbang (the sewing department), and subang (the embroidery department) came from the jungin class (literally "middle class"); the others mostly came from "commoner's class". Common kungnyŏ entered the palace at the age of twelve to thirteen, whereas jimil nain entered there at the age of four to eight, and nain for the sewing and embroidery departments began to serve the court at six to thirteen.

Such "trainee kungnyŏ" received the necessary education to become kungnyŏ, such as learning court language, required daily conducts and behaviors, and writing gungche (palace-style font). Some kungnyŏ left refined calligraphy works written in hangul (the Korean alphabet) with the gungche or Gyechuk ilgi (Diary of the Year Gyechuk, 1613) and Inhyeon wanghujeon (Tales of Queen Inhyeon), all of which are regarded as excellent examples of the "palace literature".

== Types ==
=== Narrow meaning ===
Kungnyŏ always distinguished themselves from the sanggung and nain because the role and social status of the groups were greatly different. The latter groups can be divided into three types; trainee nain, nain, and sanggung. They were treated differently according to their experience and length of service at court and in affiliated departments. Even the sanggung group was divided by rank according to their experience, and sanggung with the same rank did not always have the same social standing. Trainee nain referred to girls who had not yet passed the gwallye (冠禮, a coming-of-age ceremony), and they were divided into saenggaksi and gaksi. The term, saenggaksi derives from the fact that the girls had a hairstyle called saengmeori. Only three departments, jimil, chimbang, and subang had the saenggaksi. After 15 years service in the palace the trainee nain became an official nain. Nain wore a jade-colored dangui (a variety of jeogori, a short jacket) and a navy blue chima (a bulky skirt) and decorated their head with a frog-shaped cheopji (a hairpin).

=== Broad meaning ===
Gaksimi is a generic term collectively referring to a housemaid, kitchen-maid, seamstress or others working at a sanggung's private residence on the sanggung's days off. Their monthly salary was paid by the state, so they were also called "bangja". The term bangja means a clerk working at a government office and is the same as the male character called bangja who appears in Chunhyangjeon (Story of Chunhyang). Musuri refers to women in charge of miscellaneous jobs (such as drawing water, making a fire, etc.) at every residence at court.

Sonnim is a type of housemaid who took charge of housekeeping at the king's concubine's residence. They were generally related to the concubine's family, and their salary was paid from the concubine's living expenses. The term means a person from outside of the palace and is a courtesy title, unlike musuri and gaksimi.

Uinyeo literally means "medicine women" and they usually treated kungnyŏ with acupuncture and acted as midwife when the king's consort or concubine gave birth. Whenever a feast was held at court they transformed themselves into gisaeng (female entertainers). For such occasions, they wore wonsam (a female ceremonial garment), hwagwan (an elaborate coronet) on their head and colorfully striped hansam (fabric extensions on the sleeves of the costume) on their hands just like dancers, so they were also called yakbang gisaeng. Consequently, yakbang is another name for naeuiwon (royal health clinic). Although uinyeo's affiliation was to the naeuiwon, their predecessors were gisaeng. The uinyeo system was originally established during King Taejong's reign because sick consorts, concubines and kungnyŏ preferred to die rather than to be seen by a male doctor, due to the strict naeoebeop (sex segregation), based on Confucianism, at that time.

Slave girls who belonged to storage or government offices were therefore chosen to train in medical practices such as pulse-checking, acupuncture and others. Because they were originally uneducated cheonmin (the despised), the uinyeo system was not very fruitful. During King Yeonsangun's reign, whenever a feast was held at each government office, uinyeo were told to participate in it as gisaeng with makeup. The system lasted until the end of the dynasty and the number of uinyeo was about 80 during King Gojong's reign. The uinyeo system disappeared when Western doctors entered the court.

== Roles ==
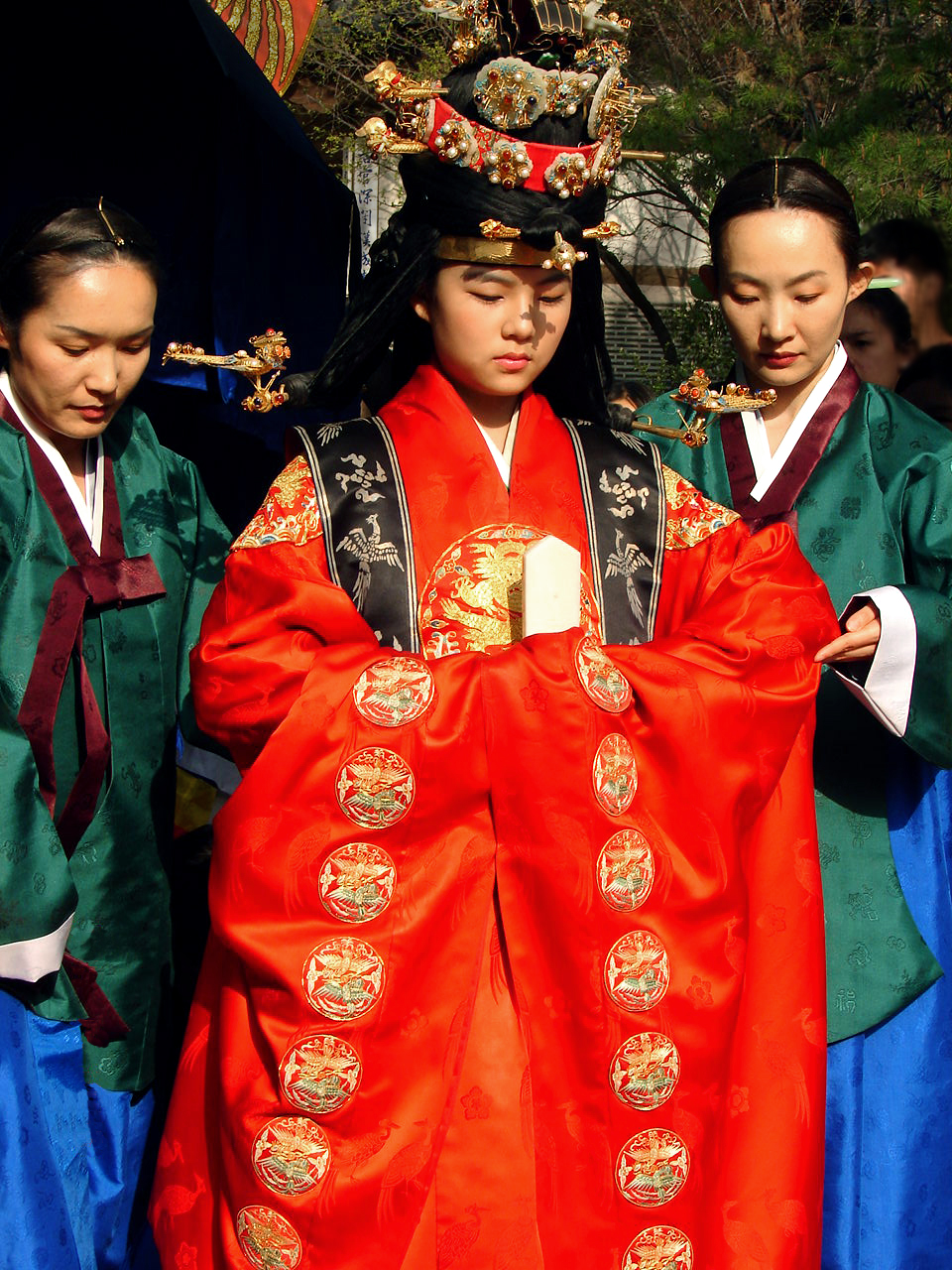
In a reenactment of a royal wedding ceremony, two models acting as kungnyŏ assist the model of the queen in the red robe.

Kungnyŏ can be described as a type of luxurious slaves for royal private life, needed in departments in charge of clothing, cooking and housing among others. Such places were:

1. jimil 지밀(至密), the innermost quarter, waiting closely on royalty,
2. chimbang 침방(針房), the sewing department,
3. subang 수방(繡房), the embroidery department,
4. naesojubang 내소주방 (內燒廚房), for preparing daily meals,
5. oesojubang 외소주방(外燒廚房), for preparing food for banquets,
6. saenggwabang 생과방(生果房), the dessert department, and
7. sedapbang 세답방(洗踏房), the laundry department.

In addition to those seven departments, four other departments existed: sesugan (洗手間, the department in charge of the king and queen's washing and bathing), toeseongan (退膳間; a food arrangement room), bogicheo (僕伊處, the department for making fires), deungchokbang (燈燭房 the department for lanterns and candlelight).

In terms of a more common individual's household jimil nain, who had the highest standing in kungnyŏ society, acted like a personal maid to the mistress. Nain (assistant court ladies) at chimbang, and subang were like seamstresses while nain at sojubang and saenggwabang were like kitchen-maids. Sedapbang managed the laundry; in common families, female slaves generally did the cleaning, while experienced housewives ironed and smoothed laundry by pounding. Jimil nain had the highest social status while nain at chimbang, and subang were next in status. They could wear a chima (a bulky skirt) in the way which yangban women did, and were allowed as a privilege to let it down long without wearing an apron. Since they worked on a floor or in a room, these nain did not need to fold up their skirt, unlike nain at sojubang, and sedapbang. Nain at the other departments rolled up their skirt with an apron. Likewise, only the former three departments could have saenggaksi (생각시, young nain with a hairstyle called "saeng" or "sayang"), while young nain at the others could not bind their hair with saeng but had to let it down in long braids.

== Rank ==
Kungnyŏ society had supervisors who acted as the head of the kungnyŏ group, and sanggung who received special treatment according to the importance of their job. Jejo sanggung (提調尙宮), also called Keunbang sanggung were senior among kungnyŏ and received the king's orders and managed properties in the queen's quarter. They exercised political power at the time. Bujejo sanggung also called Arigo sanggung (阿里庫) took charge of items in stores attached to the queen's quarter. Jimil sanggung also called Daeryeong sanggung waited closely on the king. Bomo sanggung took charge of nursing princes or princesses, and among them those who served the crown prince had the highest standing among the group. Sinyeo sanggung were in charge of assisting the king, queen and queen dowager whenever a national ceremony or feast occurred. They also managed books and documents of the Jimil sanggung and did gokeup (mourning and crying loudly). Gamchal sanggung gave rewards or punishments to relevant kungnyŏ, acting as a supervisors, and were held in awe by other kungnyŏ. Some kungnyŏ who were favoured by the king could take political power and improve their rank.

Palace ladies were subordinate to the queen, and were ranked below the Royal Consorts (ne-gwan 내관). The ranks for kungnyŏ would could reach the 5th rank at the highest, but typically started much lower in the 9th rank.

There were 5 ranks for palace ladies with two levels each.

- Special rank – Favored Sanggung (승은상궁) was a sanggung who shared the King's bed and could become a royal concubine.
- Fifth rank upper – Head lady (jejo sang-gung 제조상궁) was a palace lady who served the king directly. The appointment decree was issued by the king.
- Fifth rank lower – First Palace Lady (leading the Royal/Queen's Secretariat): Sang-bok (상복) and Sang-shik (상식)
- Sixth rank upper – Chief Palace Lady (e.g. leading the royal kitchen): Sang-chim (상침) and Sang-gong (상공)
- Sixth rank lower – Sang-jeong (상정) and Sang-gi (상기)
- Seventh rank upper – Leading Palace Lady (being charge of a specific activity): Chon-bin (전빈), Chon-ui (전의) and Chon-son (전선)
- Seventh rank lower – Jeon-seol (전설), Jeon-je (전제) and Jeon-eon (전언)
- Eighth rank upper – Jeon-chan (전찬), Jeon-shik (전식) and Jeon-yak (전약)
- Eighth rank lower – Jeon-deung (전등), Jeon-che (전채) and Jeon-jeong (전정)
- Ninth rank upper – Ju-gung (주궁), Ju-sang (주상) and Ju-gak (주각)
- Ninth rank lower – Ju-byeon-chi (주변치), ju-chi (주치), ju-oo (주우) and Ju-byeon-gung (주변궁)

The palace ladies were followed by lower rank ladies-in-waiting (e.g. palace lady candidates), servants and slaves.

== Number ==
The total number of kungnyŏ included not only kungnyŏ at the main palace where the king resided but also at Jesagung, palaces for jesa (ancestor veneration) and Byeolgung, (annex palaces). Kungnyŏ who worked within the main palace despised those who worked in annexed palaces, calling them gunggeot (the one at the palace). In the main palace, the king's quarter was managed as an independent household, and all of the king, queen, queen dowager's quarters had the same number of kungnyŏ. It has been suggested that kungnyŏ numbered 90 in total. Each of these residences would have twenty to twenty seven jimil nain and the other places would have fifteen to twenty.

The total number differed from time and was increased or decreased depending on circumstances at court. While the number of kungnyŏ in the early period of the Joseon Dynasty was not great, it tended to increase as time went by. During King Seongjong's reign (1469–1494), 105 kungnyŏ in total served the palace, with 29 for the mother of the previous king, 27 for the queen dowager's quarter and 49 for the king's quarter. During the reign of King Gojong (1863–1907), the total number of kungnyŏ reached 480; 100 for the king's quarter, 100 for the queen dowager's quarter, 100 for the queen, 60 for the crown prince, 40 for the crown princess, 50 for the seson (eldest legitimate son of the crown prince), and 30 for the wife of the seson.

== Lifetime employment and payment ==
All kungnyŏ within the palace were basically tied for life, from their acceptance into the palace until the time at which they had to leave. Once they entered service they had to live inside the palace for their whole life, except for special occasions. Apart from the king and his immediate household, nobody, not even his concubines, could die in the royal court, so when kungnyŏ became old or ill, they had to leave the palace. There were other reasons to release kungnyŏ from the palace, such as when their superior or master was ill, or when a drought happened, a certain number of kungnyŏ were released in appeasement of the natural calamity. In the latter case, such released kungnyŏ were restricted in their actions, prohibited from marrying, and would be harshly punished if they violated these rules. Thus kungnyŏ lived completely isolated from outside life, and were not allowed to contact men, or even other women, except by release from service. The life of kungnyŏ is depicted in an ancient novel titled Unyeongjeon (雲英傳) written by an anonymous writer during the Joseon Dynasty.

Kungnyŏ received a graded monthly salary according to rank and living necessities as their payment, but the price was not fixed. It varied according to economic circumstances at that time. Service was assumed to be on a day-shift basis.

== See also ==
- Lady-in-waiting
- Related films: Dae Jang Geum, Shadows in the Palace, Dong Yi
- Joseon Dynasty politics
