= Jewel in the Palace =

2003–2004 South Korean television series

- Also known as: Dae Jang Geum
- Genre: Historical drama
- Written by: Kim Young-hyun
- Directed by: Lee Byung-hoon
- Starring: Lee Young-ae; Ji Jin-hee; Hong Ri-na; Im Ho
- Opening theme: "Changryong"
- Ending theme: "Onara"
- Country of origin: South Korea
- Original language: Korean
- No. of episodes: 54

Production
- Executive producer: Jo Joong-hyun
- Camera setup: Multi-camera
- Running time: 60 minutes
- Production company: MBC
- Budget: US$15 million

Original release
- Network: MBC TV
- Release: September 15, 2003 – March 23, 2004

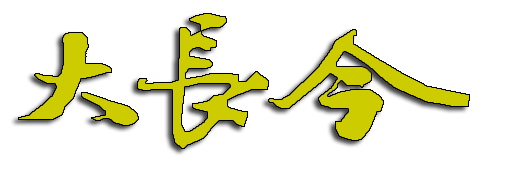
Logo of the show in Hanja

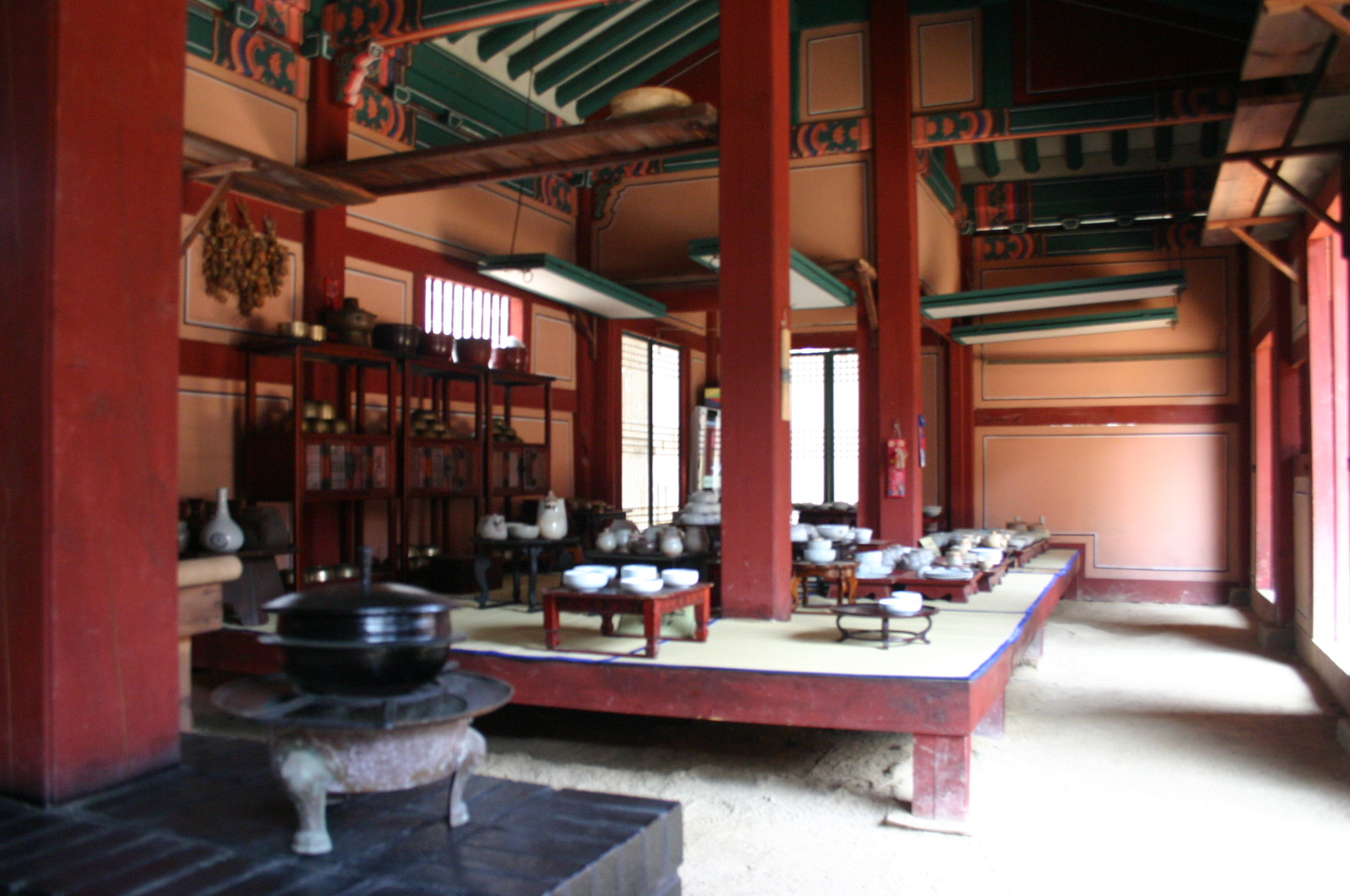
The film set of the royal kitchen, as part of the Dae Jang Geum Theme Park

Jewel in the Palace (Korean: 대장금; Hanja: 大長今; RR: Daejanggeum) is a 2003 South Korean historical drama television series directed by Lee Byung-hoon. It first aired on MBC from September 15, 2003, to March 23, 2004, where it was the top program with an average viewership rating of 45.8% and a peak of 57.1%. Produced for US$15 million, it was later exported to 91 countries and has earned US$103.4 million worldwide, being known as one of the primary proponents of the Korean Wave by heightening the spread of Korean culture abroad.

Starring Lee Young-ae in the title role, it tells the tale of an orphaned kitchen cook who went on to become the King's first female physician. In a time when women held little influence in society, young apprentice cook Jang-geum strives to learn the secrets of Korean cooking and medicine to cure the King of his various ailments. It is based on the true story of Janggeum, the first female royal physician of the Joseon period. The main themes are her perseverance and the portrayal of traditional Korean culture, including Korean royal court cuisine and traditional medicine.

== Synopsis ==
The story is set in Korea during the reigns of King Seongjong (1457–1494), King Yeonsangun (1494–1506) and King Jungjong (1506–1544). The epilogue also spans through the reigns of King Injong (1544–1545) and King Myeongjong (1545–1567), with the last scene from March 1550.

At the outset, in 1482, King Seongjong has ordered the forced suicide by poisoning of his wife, the Deposed Queen Yun, mother of the crown prince (future Yeonsan-gun). After carrying out the execution, one of the royal guards, Seo Cheon-soo, is haunted by the cursing of the executed queen. Trying to calm his nerves by drinking at a local pub, the drunken Seo accidentally falls off a cliff on his way home and is rescued by a mysterious Taoist hermit with a cryptic message – that his life will revolve around three women: the first he has killed, but has never truly died; another he will save, but will die because of him; and the third will kill him, but will go on to save many lives. The hermit also leaves Seo three Hanja characters and refuses to elaborate any further before magically vanishing, and it does not become clear until later in the story that the three women are the deposed Queen Yun, Park Myeong-yi (Seo's eventual wife) and Jang-geum (Seo's daughter). Haunted by his prophesied fate at the hands of the third woman, he becomes paranoid and refuses to approach any woman. After many years the former king dies, and the Crown Prince ascends the throne and becomes increasingly violent and tyrannical, so Seo abandons his post in self-exile.

Park Myeong-yi is a palace girl and apprentice cook of the royal kitchen. In 1496, she witnesses a fellow apprentice, a girl from the powerful Choi clan named Choi Seong-geum, slip poison into the Grand Royal Queen Dowager's food. Unaware that the senior kitchen officers are part of a conspiracy against the said Queen, Myeong-yi informs them. The officers, fearful that Myeong-yi might reveal their conspiracy, attempt to murder her by framing her for committing adultery with a royal guard, then executing her with poison. Myeong-yi's best friend, Han Baek-young, manages to save her by secretly diluting the poison with a mung bean soup and leaves the unconscious Myeong-yi a letter explaining what had happened. As Seo Cheon-soo wanders through the forest, he stumbles upon and rescues the half-conscious Myeong-yi, and the two fall in love. Despite being warned by Seo Cheon-soo himself that she may die because of him, Park Myeong-yi nevertheless was willing to marry him. They end up living peacefully in a remote village as lower caste commoners and raise a clever daughter named Seo Jang-geum.

In 1504, when Jang-geum is eight years old, King Yeonsan learns about the murder of his mother and vows revenge, seeking and killing people who were previously involved. Among them is Jang-geum's father, who so far managed to hide his identity. However, following an incident, Jang-geum accidentally reveals her father's identity and causes him to be arrested (and presumably executed later on). Her mother, rushing on the way to Hanyang to try to save her husband, is spotted by the Choi family and eventually killed by an arrow. Jang-geum, now an orphan, is adopted by Kang Duk-gu and Na Ju-daek, a family making a living through selling wine. Two years later, Jang-geum enters the palace after King Jungjong ascends to the throne. She is committed to enter the middle kitchen (where her mother used to cook) to uncover a letter written by her mother. During this time, she meets Lady Han and they form a mother-daughter bond. In 1519, the Right State Councillor Oh Gyeom-ho (the Choi clan's ally within the Royal Cabinet) frames Lady Han and Jang-geum as traitors in league with Jo Gwang-jo, the famous Joseon reformer. In an effort to save Jang-geum, Lady Han declares that she alone is guilty of treason. Nonetheless, both are judged guilty and sent to Jeju Island to work as government slaves. On the way to Jeju, Lady Han died from her injuries. Lady Choi replaces her as head of the royal kitchen, while Jang-geum vows revenge. Initially, Jang Geum tried multiple times to escape from Jeju; however, official Min Jeong-ho followed her to Jeju Island and convinced her to stay. Jang Geum accepted and vowed to come back to the palace in the proper way, since that is the only way not only to clear Lady Han's name, but obtain justice for her mother's death. Min Jeong-ho declares he will wait for her and help her out throughout her stay in Jeju.

There, Jang-geum meets a woman named Jang-deok, a famous female doctor. Jang-deok's blunt and forthright manner at first offend her, but as time goes by, she begins to see that the female doctor is dedicated and caring. As the days go by, Jang-geum realizes that her only way back to the palace is to become a female physician, and begs Jang-deok to teach her medicine. Jang-geum's friend, Jeong Woon-baek, an eccentric royal physician, disapproves of her decision to pursue medicine in order to take revenge, but, in spite of this, she perseveres and earns herself a post as a female doctor-in-training at the palace. Here she encounters her former friend Choi Keum-young, who has been promoted to head lady of the kitchen, while the ruthlessly ambitious Lady Choi is now in charge of all the women working in the palace. Jang-geum's childhood best friend, Lee Yeun-seng, has caught the king's eye, and is now his concubine. Jang-geum endures many trials at the palace, but manages to accomplish great feats.

Through her dedication, perseverance and medical skills, Jang-geum saves the royal family from recurring ill fortune. After giving birth to a stillborn child, Queen Munjeong remains ill. Jang-geum correctly identifies a second stillborn fetus in her womb and saves her life. She convinces the Dowager Queen to undergo medical treatment at the risk of being beheaded. Ultimately she got the opportunity to successfully treat the King's illness.

With Jang-geum's status rising, she pleaded the King to reopen the investigation leading to Lady Han's wrongful death. Several events ensue that lead to an investigation of the Choi clan, resulting in the prosecution of Lady Choi, her elder brother and several high-ranking officials, including the Chief State Councillor. Everyone tries to escape, but only Lady Choi manages to evade the guards. Jang-geum finds her and asks if she is willing to sacrifice her niece, Keum-young, to the authorities while she herself escapes. Having abandoned her ethics and conscience for the sake of the Choi clan a long time ago, Lady Choi is unable to respond. Torn between self-preservation and guilt, she wanders the countryside hallucinating, ends up falling off a cliff on Dongin Mountain (where Jang-geum's mother died) and dies. Choi Keum-young lost her position and had to leave the palace, while other officials were exiled.

For her achievements King Jungjong makes Jang-geum a sixth-rank official and appoints her to be his personal physician, the first woman to hold such a position. The court is in uproar and the state councillors unanimously oppose the appointment on the grounds that it violates the country's constitution. When the Dowager Queen humiliates herself to express her disapproval, the King revokes his decision. Jang-geum contains a smallpox epidemic, curing Grand Prince Gyeongwon of smallpox, which earns her the permanent gratitude of the Queen. Despite that, Dowager Queen still urged the King to take Jang-geum as one of his concubines. Although he liked Jang-geum, he understood Jang Geum was in love with Min Jeong-ho, and wanted to keep pursuing being a physician. Eventually, he refrained from making her one of his concubines against her will, and decreed Jang-geum his personal physician. She is granted the honorific Dae (meaning "The Great"), as well as the position of a third-rank official. The ministers and scholars of the court bitterly accept the decree, but demand the punishment of Min Jeong-ho for supporting Jang-geum's appointment. Seeing an opportunity to separate the lovers, the King agrees and Jeong-ho is sentenced to exile.

Eventually, the King's previous medical condition re-emerges. Jang-geum attempts to heal him using all the medical equipment and knowledge available at the time. The other doctors offer advice but nothing works. The king is dying. Jang-geum resorts to her last option—an experimental technique using newly "discovered" anesthesia and surgery. However, the King's body is considered sacred and the court unanimously opposes this new procedure, and the King decides not to allow the operation. Knowing Jang-geum's life will be in danger after his death, he grants her escape to be with Min Jeong-ho. The two of them live as fugitives and have a daughter, So-hoon.

Eight years later, in 1550, King Jungjong is dead and Grand Prince Gyeongwon has been enthroned, while his mother Queen Munjeong is now both the Royal Queen Dowager and the Regent, wielding enormous power. When she learns that Jang-geum is still in the country, she invites her and Jeong-ho to return to the palace and be reinstated to their previous positions. Jang-geum and Jeong-ho joyfully return, but decide to live outside the palace for the sake of their family. Jang-geum leaves the palace, but not before seeing her friends from afar. As they return to their previous routine, Jang-geum comes across a pregnant woman, and successfully uses her surgical skills to deliver the woman's baby via Caesarean section. While she celebrates her success, Jeong-ho laments the repressive social climate of Korea, and its inability to accommodate a woman with ambitions.

== Cast ==
=== Main characters ===
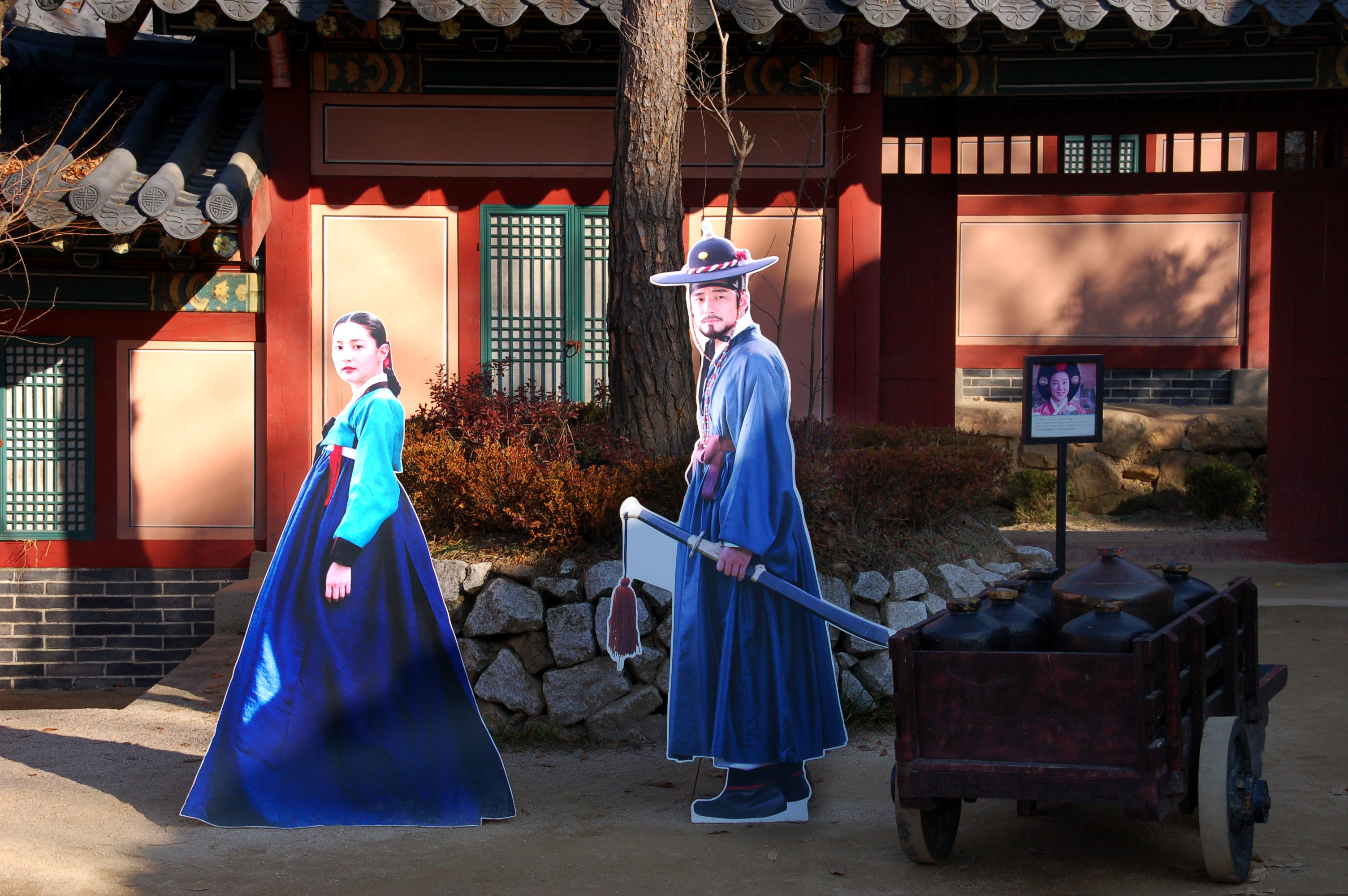
Cut-outs of the main characters Jang-geum and Min Jeong-ho at the film set

- Lee Young-ae as Seo Jang-geum
  - Jo Jung-eun as young Seo Jang-geum

An intelligent, beautiful, and introverted woman whose compassionate nature and enthusiasm allow her to stand out from the crowd. Ever since her parents died during a political massacre, she has suffered many hardships and obstacles, especially in the palace, but she overcomes them with strong determination and perseverance.

Being strong-willed, Jang-geum strives to reach her goal regardless of the obstacles she is facing. It is with her extraordinary medical skills and knowledge, as well as her integrity and high ethics to only use her knowledge to heal and cure, that she becomes the first female physician to the king, and named Dae ("the Great") Jang-geum, becoming a third-ranked official, something unheard of at the time for a woman during the Joseon era.

- Ji Jin-hee as Min Jeong-ho

An educated, very intelligent and good-looking man, he is an outstanding scholar who combines both learning and the martial arts. Jeong-ho is a judge of the Hang Sung Boo, the ministry governing the affairs of the capital Hansung. Unaware of who he is, Jang-geum saves him upon being shot. They then meet again when she approaches him to borrow books. They become romantically involved as he moves to Nae Geum Wee (the Royal Military Guard) as Jong Sa Gwan, a senior officer.

- Hong Ri-na as Choi Keum-young
  - Lee Se-young as young Choi Keum-young

Ambitious and arrogant, Choi Keum-young starts her life in the palace as the niece of the influential Lady Choi, a former friend that becomes Jang-geum's lifelong rival. Although she is part of the Choi clan, she yearns to find her own way - never really accepting the Chois' way of doing things but unable to find her own independent identity. Her intelligence and talent often put her head-to-head with Jang-geum. Eventually Lady Choi's influence and her unreciprocated attraction to Min Jeong-ho prompt her to keep mostly to the Choi clan's ways.

- Im Ho as King Jungjong

The 11th king of the Joseon Dynasty. Before he ascends the throne, he was known as Grand Prince Jinsung. He suffered from various illnesses, but Jang-Geum healed him for the first time. But when his illness re-emerges, Jang-Geum want to use her newly discovered method, the anaesthesia and surgery but because they believed that the king's body is sacred for operations, he declined it. Instead, he helped Jang-Geum and Min-Jun-Ho to escape.

- Yang Mi-kyung as Han Baek-young/Lady Han

As one of the sanggungs working in the royal kitchen (soorakgan), she possesses a talent in culinary art and is able to identify the source of the ingredients in a dish. Best friend to Jang-geum's mother, she often misses and regrets not being able to save her friend. She is a rigorous, steadfast person who is not to be swayed from her purpose. Although obdurate in nature, she is actually very kind-hearted. Jang-geum's presence allows her to open up and she treats her as both a strict teacher and a kind mother figure. She also became the second mother to Yeun-Seng after Lady Jung died from illness.

- Kyeon Mi-ri as Choi Seong-geum/Lady Choi

Choi Pan-sul's younger sister and Geum-young's aunt. With her family hierarchy and bloodline, she is expected to be the successor of the soorakgan's highest sanggung rank. She learned and was taught about the delicacy of food from a young age. Arrogant and too proud, she has a fierce need to get what she wants. Sharp-minded and quick to act, she is always a step ahead of plotting against Jang-geum and Lady Han. She hasn't been nice to Jang-geum, Jang-geum's mother and Lady Han. She framed Head Lady Park Yong-Shin holding private parties to become the Head Lady and to make Keum-Young became the Head Kitchen Lady.

=== Supporting characters ===
Early life

- Park Chan-hwan as Seo Cheon-soo - Jang-geum's father and a former royal guard.
- Kim Hye-sun as Park Myeong-yi - Jang-geum's mother and a former kitchen lady. Best friend to Lady Han but she became an enemy to Lady Choi when they find out that she saw their planned conspiracy.
- Im Hyun-sik as Kang Duk-gu - Ju-Daek's husband. Jang-geum's adoptive father and a palace chef.
- Geum Bo-ra as Na Ju-daek - Duk-gu's wife and Jang-geum's adoptive mother. She and Duk-Gu earn a living by selling wine, and sometimes by being conmans selling "miracle" medicines and wines which are nothing but regular but tasty wines. Despite being quite materialistic, over time she has grown to care for Jang-geum and give her a protective shelter both in her childhood and later in her adult life.

Time as a palace chef

- Park Eun-hye as Lee Yeon-seng - Royal Consort Suk-won - Dowager Royal Noble Consort Suk-won of the Lee Clan, the 8th wife of King Jungjong - Jang-Geum's best friend. Naive, cheerful and lovely, she got the King's attention when the King saw her crying and playing the King's dog while missing her best friend Jang-Geum and Lady Han. She became the King's concubine when she became pregnant to the King's child (which is a princess). After King Jungjong's death, the Dowager Queen Munjeong treat her like her sister and also grant permission to her for remaining and stayed in royal harem.
- Lee Ip-sae as Yoon Young-roh - niece of Yoon Mak-Gae and a loyal person to Choi family. She often supports the actions of the Choi family against Lady Han and Jang-Geum believing that their families shared the same fate. Her loyalty to the Choi clan fruits, when she became the Attendant Lady of Head Lady Choi. Her life goes to jeopardy when Lady Choi asked her to hide while the Right State Councilor asked her to reveal the story between Lady Choi and Jang-Geum in exchange of Head Lady position.
- Kim So-yi as Min Gwi-yeol - the mentor of Chang-yi and second teacher to Seo Jang-geum and Lee Yeun-seng. She became Attendant Lady of Suk-Won Lee after discovering that Lee Yeun-Seng is pregnant to the King's child. She also became the Head Kitchen Lady through competition.
- Yeo Woon-kay as Jung Mal-geum - Yeun-Seng's mentor and mother figure from Sauce Pantry. She became the Kitchen Head Lady after the former Head Kitchen Lady (which is Lady Choi's aunt) resigns from her position because of age and health problems and Lady Choi is not old enough to be the next Kitchen Head Lady. Besides her excellent cooking, she loves singing and telling stories, which the King highly praised her. A firm believer in meritocracy and opponent to nepotism and seniority, she started the concept of competition in choosing the next Head Kitchen Lady.
- Park Jung-soo as Park Yong-shin - former Head Lady and Park Yeul-Yee's adoptive mother. After Lady Han and Janggeum thrown to Jeju Island, She got kicked out of the palace after Lady Choi framed her for holding private parties.
- Choi Ja-hye as Chang-yi - Jang-Geum's and Yeun-Seng's friend who loves eating. She also became the Kitchen Lady of Yeun-Seng when the latter is became pregnant to King's child. Eventually she became the Head Kitchen Lady after the departure of Lady Choi.
  - Joo Da-young as young Chang-yi.
- Jo Gyeong-hwan as Oh Gyeom-ho - The Right State Councilor, ally of the Choi family in the Royal Cabinet.
- Lee Hee-do as Choi Pan-sul - a merchant brother of Lady Choi and Keum-Young's uncle.
- Na Seong-gyun as Yoon Mak-gae - Young-roh's uncle and a palace guard. He owns a dancer bar where the Chois, Oh-Gyeom-Ho and their allies frequently meet. Even though he's a loyal person to Choi clan, his loyalty goes more to Oh-Gyeom-ho.
- Lee Hye-sang as Jo Bang
  - Kim So-young / Chae So-young as young Jo Bang

The envious and bossy kitchen lady. She believes that since she is the oldest, everyone should follow and fear her. She envies Keum-Young because she always won the competition when they were younger. When they are adults, she envies Keum-Young (again) and Jang-Geum when they were chosen as apprentices of Lady Choi and Lady Han for the competition instead of her.

- Shin Gook as Jang Geon - the head Eunuch. Head Kitchen Lady Jung's ally to the Eunuch's Department. He's is also an ally to Lady Han & Janggeum but his loyalty to the King tested when Lady Choi discovered that Jang-Geum stole the King's Medical Records (which is under the care of Eunuch's Department).

Time as a medical woman

- Jeon In-taek as Doctor Jeong Yoon-soo - King's Physician. When he failed to know the cause and cure to the King's illness, he resigned from his position. His life goes to jeopardy because of his knowledge about the Choi's and Right State Councilor's involvement in brimstone duck case.
- Maeng Sang-hoon as Professor Jeong Woon-baek - A physician/supervisor of Royal Garden. As a supervisor of Royal Garden, he wants everyone to stop working that makes Jang-Geum disliked him at first. But later on, she realized how caring and dedicated he is. After healed by Jang-Deok on his tumor, He returned to the palace as the Queen's physician. At first, he didn't support Janggeum's reason that she take medicine to return on palace for revenge. He also promoted to Queen Dowager's physician after Physician Shin became the King's physician.
- Kim Yeo-jin as Jang-deok - a caring and dedicated physician from Jeju and also Jang-Geum's mentor in medicine.
- Han Ji-min as Shin-bi - a kind and trustworthy friend to Jang-Geum. She entered in Royal Pharmacy with Jang-Geum. She is a palace nurse to Crown Prince and Suk-Won Lee when they discovered Yeul-Yee misdiagnosed the latter.
- Lee Se-eun as Park Yeul-Yee - A palace nurse who offered herself to Choi clan to kill Jang-Geum to gain their trust. It was revealed later that she is the adoptive daughter of the former Head Lady, Park Yong-Shin.
- Lee Seung-ah as Eun-Bi - A palace nurse who previously assigned as in-charge of King's medicine until she assigned as physician lady of the Queen Dowager Jasun.
- Park Eun-soo as Physician Shin Ik-Phil - a strict trainer of Jang-geum and Shin-bi when they enter the palace. He became strict to Jang-Geum not because he hates her but he want Jang-Geum to be a better physician lady. He became the Queen Dowager's physician, but she doesn't trust him at first because of the story about his patient in the past who died under his care. He promoted to King's physician when Physician Jeong Yoon-Soo resigned from his position after he failed to discover the cause and cure to the King's illness.
- Yeom Hong as Bi Seon - the royal medical staff discipliner and also the assistant head of physician ladies.
- Professor Lee - another one of Jang-geum and Shin-bi's trainers. He calls physician trainees to become dancers when there is a special event. He is also Queen Dowager Jasun's relative.

Royal Women

- Park Jeong-sook as Queen Munjeong - King Jungjong's 3rd wife, and Prince Gyeongwon's mother. She was a crucial ally of Jang-geum during her time as a physician, granting her favorable treatments and even using her power to allow Jang-geum directly diagnose the King when she didn't trust the head physician's diagnosis. Later on, that trust came into test when the Queen asked Jang-geum to be the physician of Crown Prince Sunhoe (later King Injong), who suffered from a terminal heart disease, but his future ascension to the throne could threaten Queen Munjeong and her son's status in the palace. The Queen secretly asked Jang-Geum to quietly kill the Crown Prince with her medical skill without letting others be aware of it.
- Eom Yoo-shin as Queen Dowager Jasun - King Jungjong's mother and also a relative of Professor Lee.

== Soundtrack ==
=== Theme song ===
The theme song, Onara (Korean: 오나라) is in Old Korean. This produced arguments about the lyrics and how they should be interpreted. As a result, different interpretations surfaced. Eventually the songwriter, Im Se-hyeon, revealed the lyrics.

The song is in the pansori style, a particular type of Korean music that emerged during the Joseon period and was very popular in the 19th century. It utilizes the vocals of one singer, a sorikkun, and one drummer, a gosu, to tell a themed story. The refrain ("He-iya di-iya he-iya naranino") is called chu-imsae and, in traditional pansori, it is supplied by the drummer to give rhythm to the song in addition to the beat. Chuimsae consists of meaningless vowel sounds or short words of encouragement. Chuimsae is analogous to scat singing in jazz nonsense syllables such as "La, la, la," or "Shoop, shoop ba doop" in English-language popular songs.

==== Korean version ====
The end of each episode of Jewel in the Palace features "Onara" sung by three Korean children, Kim Ji-hyeon (Korean: 김지현; Hanja: 金智賢), Baek Bo-hyeon (Korean: 백보현; Hanja: 白寶賢), Kim Seul-gi (Korean: 김슬기; Hanja: 金슬기), who were elementary students learning Korean classic music at the time. The Jewel in the Palace soundtrack album also features a slower version of the song sung by E Ahn (Korean: 이안; Hanja: 李安; her real name is Lee Dong-hee (Korean: 이동희; Hanja: 李冬熙)), a Korean traditional music singer who graduated from the Korean classical music department at Seoul National University.

==== Foreign versions ====
"Onara" has several other versions that were used with Jewel in the Palace's release outside of Korea. "Hope" (希望 Hèimohng) was the version sung by Kelly Chen in Cantonese for the Hong Kong release. "Baby" (娃娃 Wáwá) was sung by Angela Chang in Mandarin Chinese for the Taiwan release. "Calling" (呼唤 Hūhuàn) sung by Tang Can, and "Hope" (希望 Xīwàng) sung by five winners of the Super Girl singing contest were among those used for the China release.

For the Philippine release, Faith Cuneta sang an entirely different song (in contrast with her earlier work for the Philippine broadcast of "Winter Sonata"), titled "Pangarap na Bituin" (a remake of the original sung by the singer's 2nd-degree aunt Sharon Cuneta as the theme song for her 1984 film "Bukas Luluhod Ang Mga Tala"). The Shamrock song "Alipin" is also used and Regine Velasquez also sings a version of this during the first re-run.

In Sri Lanka, the Sinhalese version was sung by Angeline Gunathilake and written by Athula Ransirilal; it was titled "Gaha kola mal gal gesee bala sitinawa" (The trees and flowers are looking at her). A Tamil version was also released with the title "Maramilay pukkal urindu parkinrana." Local musical instruments such as the raban were used in the recording, and both songs were very popular among children.

=== Original soundtrack ===
1. 고원 (高原)
2. 창룡 (蒼龍)
3. 하망연 (何茫然) Hamangyeon - feat. Safina
4. 오나라 II
5. 0815 (空八一五)
6. 연밥
7. 덕구
8. Hamangyeon feat. Safina
9. APNA
10. 다솜
11. 비 (悲)
12. 단가 (短歌)
13. 연도 (烟濤)
14. 오나라 I
15. The Legend Becomes History
16. 자야오가 (子夜吳歌) Techno Ver.
17. 하망연 (何茫然) Hamangyeon-Instrumental

== Awards ==
2003 MBC Drama Awards

- Grand Prize/Daesang - Lee Young-ae
- Top Excellence Award, Actress - Lee Young-ae
- Special Acting Award - Yang Mi-kyung
- Special Acting Award - Lim Hyun-sik
- Best Screenplay - Kim Young-hyun

2004 Baeksang Arts Awards

- Best Director (TV) - Lee Byung-hoon
- Most Popular Actress (TV) - Yang Mi-kyung

== Cultural impact ==
Jewel in the Palace was part of the Korean Wave in East Asia, where it gained immense popularity and had a significant cultural impact.

=== Tourism ===
The Korea Tourism Organization promoted Jewel in the Palace-oriented tourism in East Asia and the United States and the main outdoor sets built by MBC for the shooting of the drama were purchased by the South Korean government. The Dae Jang Geum Theme Park was opened in Yongin, Gyeonggi Province in December 2004 at the site of these sets where much of the filming occurred.

=== Korean cuisine ===
Jewel in the Palace rekindled public interest in traditional Korean cuisine, both locally and abroad.

=== References in other shows ===
In an episode of King of the Hill, Kahn and Minh were watching Jewel in the Palace (which is dubbed in Laotian).

In episode 1 of Princess Hours, Chae-gyeong's family is watching episode 30 of Jewel in the Palace (Yeon-saeng being scolded for playing with the King's puppy).

In episode 32 of Love Truly, Yeo Bong-soon's mother (played by Geum Bo-ra) is watching Jewel in the Palace. Geum Bo-ra played Jang-geum's adoptive mother Na Joo-daek in Dae Jang-geum.

In episode 9 of Who Are You, there is a large Jewel in the Palace poster on the side of a building.

In episode 2 of Silence, a Taiwanese drama starring Park Eun-hye, Jewel in the Palace is mentioned as a famous Korean drama.

In episode 8 of Playful Kiss, Jewel in the Palace is mentioned despite the bad cooking skills of the main character.

In the final episode of the 2007 series, Yi San, a character played by Lee Ip-sae and her colleague have a moment of deja vu in the royal kitchen and come to believe that they worked there in their previous life. The same series takes place two centuries later in the Joseon Dynasty after Jewel in the Palace. Lee Ip-sae also starred in Jewel in the Palace and the other series is also produced by the same company and director.

In season 2, episode 9 of Learn Way, Im Ho reprised his role as King Jungjong to teach Mijoo about acting in historical dramas.

== Musical theatre ==
In 2007, Jewel in the Palace was made into a stage musical titled "The Great Janggeum," staged at the Seoul Arts Center from May 26 to June 16. Following the same storyline, it condensed 54 episodes of the original TV drama into a two-and-a-half-hour-long musical which combined Western orchestral music with traditional Korean group dances. The production used 400 different traditional Korean costumes. Producer Han Jin-sup said the musical used music to substitute for visual effects, "rhythm and melodies that replace the enjoyment of watching beautiful sets of Korean food and also have lots of Korean colors and styles to amaze audiences". For example, when girls in the royal kitchen made dumplings to win the cooking competition, "plate dances" expressed the enthusiasm of the girls and the variety of dumplings. A total of 40 songs for the musical were arranged and written by Cho Sung-woo, a film composer. This was the first time that Cho had written vocal and background music for a musical, saying, "This is a great opportunity and an honor for musicians like me to have a chance to write songs for musical productions. I tried to make songs that have both the Korean and Western melodies." Asked about how to deliver a storyline that requires some knowledge of Korean history to foreign audiences, co-chairman of PMC Production Song Seung-hwan cited the familiarity of most Asian viewers with the drama's plot and said the musical will highlight "love," as a universal theme in the musical.

The musical was again staged at Sungjeon Hall in Gyeonghuigung on September 5–30, 2008. Hosted by the Seoul Foundation for Arts and Culture and the government of Seoul, it was the foundation's idea to put the ancient palaces to added use beyond mere preservation and protection for viewing. Gyeonghuigung was one of the Five Grand Palaces built in the Joseon period); about ten kings of the era stayed at the palace from King Injo to King Cheoljong. In the latter Joseon period, the palace served as a secondary palace ― a place where the king moves in times of emergency, as it was situated on the west side of Seoul. The palace was built incorporating the slanted geography of the surrounding mountain and boasts traditional beauty along with architecture rich with historical significance. The upgraded version of the musical highlighted the musical elements to better portray each character based on the more historical facts, reinterpreting the work through a new theme rather than the episodes. Keeping the colors, patterns, touches of the structures intact, the production used the natural backgrounds, traditional atmosphere and the outdoor characteristics. While the story revolved around an historic palace from the Joseon period, the musical incorporated hip hop, fast tempos and a dynamic staging. The actors also performed rap.

== Spin-off ==
The animated rendition of Jewel in the Palace, called Jang Geum's Dream is much the same story but focuses on Jang-geum in her younger years.

== Sequel ==
In September 2012, MBC announced its plans to produce a sequel, Dae Jang Geum 2. In his opening speech at a cultural contents forum in Seoul in October 2013, MBC president Kim Jong-guk reaffirmed the project, saying, "We'll push for the production in the first half of 2015 after a year of pre-production."

In March 2014, writer Kim Young-hyun confirmed that the series would be aired in October 2014, and that lead actress Lee Young-ae who had previously turned down offers of a sequel since her semi-retirement from acting in 2006, was "positively considering" reprising her role. In Kim's synopsis, Jang-geum would lose her husband and her daughter would be kidnapped and taken to China. The first half of the series would follow her search in China, where the original series had a large following, and filming would take place there. After returning home unsuccessfully, Jang-geum would take on a young successor: the daughter of Geum-young, her rival from the first series. The sequel was ultimately not produced.

In January 2024, Fantagio announced that Lee Young-ae would return as Jang-geum in a new series, tentatively titled Uinyeo Dae Jang Geum, following the character's later life. However, KPJ, the agency of original writer Kim Young-hyun, stated that the project was neither a sequel, a spin-off nor a prequel to the 2003 series, that Kim holds the rights to its characters and story, and that she had learned of the production only through media reports.

== International broadcast ==
In China, Hunan TV purchased the rights to Jewel in the Palace for US$10,000 per episode following the success of the program in South Korea and Taiwan. Ratings for the program peaked at 180 million viewers and generated unprecedented profits for the station.

== See also ==
- History of Korea
- Korean Wave
- Jang Geum
- Jang Geum's Dream - the animated television series
- Dr. Quinn, Medicine Woman - American series about a female doctor
- Muhteşem Yüzyıl
