= Kyeon Mi-ri =

South Korean actress and singer

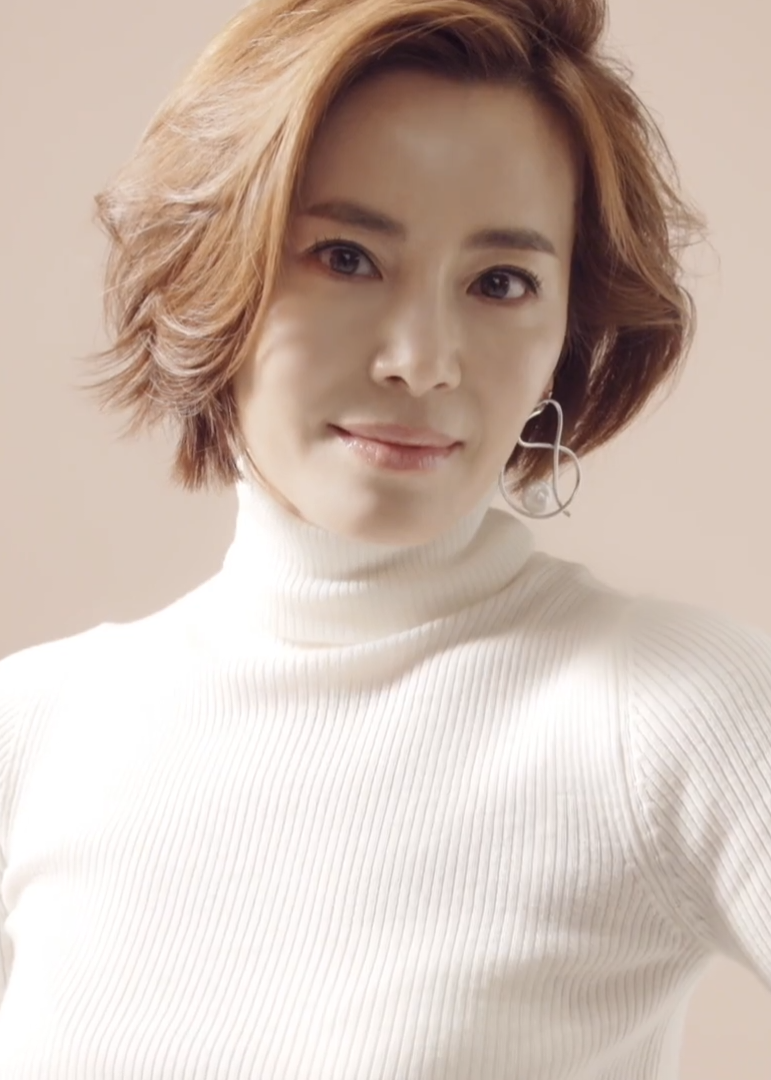
- Kyeon in 2017
- Born: Seoul, South Korea
- Education: Sejong University – Department of Dance
- Occupations: Actress; singer
- Years active: 1984–present
- Spouse(s): Im Young-gyu (m. 1987; div. 1993) Lee Hong-hun (m. 1998)
- Children: Lee Yu-bi; Lee Da-in; Lee Ki-baek
- Family: Lee Seung-gi (son-in-law)

Korean name
- Hangul: 견미리
- Hanja: 甄美里
- RR: Gyeon Miri
- MR: Kyŏn Miri

Kyeon Mi-ri (Korean: 견미리) is a South Korean actress and singer. She is best known for her role as the antagonist Lady Choi in the hit period drama Jewel in the Palace (2003).

== Career ==
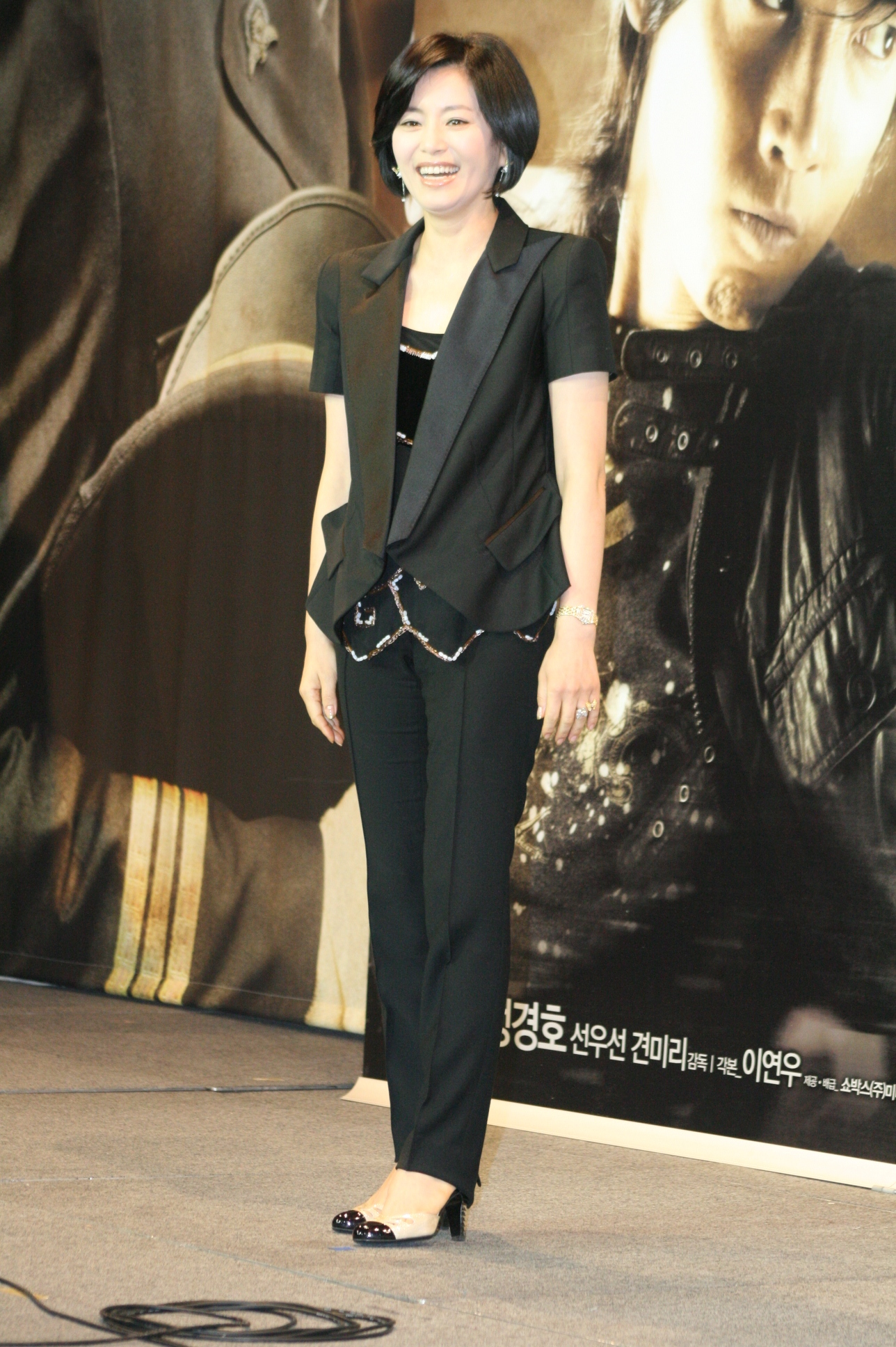
Kyeon in 2009

Kyeon Mi-ri graduated from Seoul Traditional Arts High School in 1983, then studied Dance at Sejong University. She made her acting debut in 1984, and has since become active in television dramas, most notably as the arrogant and ambitious Lady Choi in the 2003 period drama Dae Jang Geum (or Jewel in the Palace), which was a hit not only in Korea but throughout Asia.

In 2009, she ventured into the music industry and released her first album titled Happy Women, consisting of mainly trot songs.

== Personal life ==
Kyeon married actor Im Young-gyu in 1987, and they divorced in 1993.

Kyeon remarried in 1998, to businessman Lee Hong-heon. They have one son, Lee Ki-baek. Lee Hong-heon legally adopted Kyeon's two daughters from her first marriage, and they took on his surname; Lee Yu-bi and Lee Da-in are both actresses. Kyeon is also a part of the Hwanggan Kyeon clan, which makes her a descendant of Kyŏn Hwŏn, who was the first king of the Hubaekje kingdom, during the Later Three Kingdoms of Korea.

In 2009, Kyeon was investigated for stock manipulation, with her husband Lee suspected of insider trading. She had bought 55,000 shares worth ₩900 million of the bioengineering startup FCBTwelve, then raked in up to ₩4.59 billion, making her the fourth biggest stock holder among entertainment celebrities at the time. Kyeon denied any wrongdoing, saying she was simply an investor.

In April 2023, Kyeon donated Lee Da-in's wedding congratulations for the disabled and vulnerable children through a partnership with the Korea Association for Information Technology for the Disabled as a token of appreciation for guests who attended and congratulated the wedding.

== Filmography ==
=== Television ===
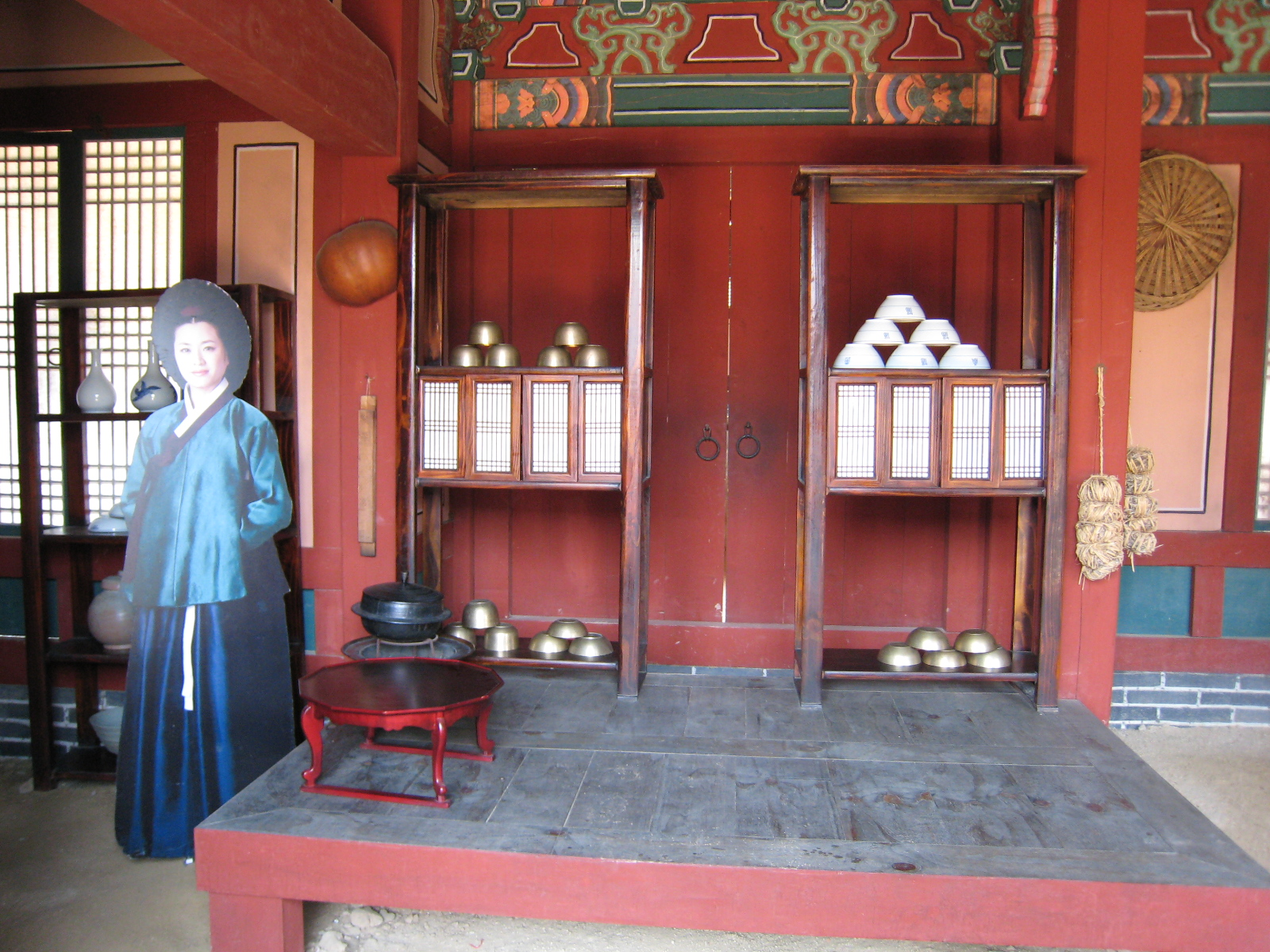
Cutout depicting Kyeon as Lady Choi on display at the Dae Jang Geum Theme Park.

| Year | Title | Role |
|---|---|---|
| 1985 | 500 Years of Joseon: "Pungran" | Jeong Nan-jeong's maid |
| 1986 | Naughty | female college student |
| 1988 | 500 Years of Joseon: "Queen Inhyeon" | Choi Suk-bin |
| 1988 | Famine in the City | Soon-jung |
| 1989 | Appointment | |
| 1989 | Giant | Seo Geum-ji |
| 1991 | Mudong's House | Kang Ha-na |
| 1993 | Han River Cuckoo | |
| 1993 | MBC Best Theater: "Sundal, Byeonggu, and Okju" | Ok-joo |
| 1994 | Han Myung-hoe | Kim Chongsŏ's concubine |
| 1995 | Tremble | |
| 1995 | Korea Gate | Lee Soon-ja |
| 1995 | Jang Hee-bin | Queen Myeongseong |
| 1995 | West Palace | |
| 1995 | LA Arirang | Kyeon Mi-ri |
| 1996 | Cute Lady | Han Jung-ja |
| 1996 | Wonji-dong Blues | |
| 1997 | Mr. Right | |
| 1998 | Six Children | Mimi's mother |
| 2000 | Legends of Love | |
| 2000 | All About Eve | Yoon Hyung-chul's stepmother |
| 2000 | Aspen Tree | younger daughter-in-law |
| 2000 | Ajumma (Housewife's Rebellion) | Choi Yoo-mi |
| 2001 | Tender Hearts | Choi Young-joo |
| 2001 | Well Known Woman | Han Young-sun |
| 2002 | Who's My Love | Park Kyung-joo |
| 2002 | To Be With You | Soon-shim |
| 2002 | Daemang (The Great Ambition) | Lady Yoo |
| 2003 | Jewel in the Palace | Choi Seong-geum |
| 2003 | A Million Roses | Hyun-kyu's maternal aunt |
| 2004 | Dal-rae's House | Kyeon Mi-ri |
| 2005 | Love and Sympathy | Yoon Ji-sook |
| 2005 | Goodbye to Sadness | Han Sung-mi |
| 2005 | Sisters of the Sea | Lee Geum-bok |
| 2006 | As the River Flows | Seo Ok-ran |
| 2006 | Jumong | Queen Wonhu |
| 2006 | Kkam-geon's Mom | Lee Do-soon |
| 2007 | Golden Bride | Yang Ok-kyung |
| 2007 | Lee San, Wind of the Palace | Lady Hyegyeong |
| 2010 | Three Sisters | Jang Ji-ae |
| 2011 | Dear My Sister | Yoon Jung-ae |
| 2011 | Just Like Today | Lee Jae-kyung |
| 2012 | Rooftop Prince | Lady Jung (Buyong and Hwayong's mother) |
| 2012 | My Kids Give Me a Headache | Shin Sae-rom |
| 2013 | Hur Jun, The Original Story | Ham Ahn-daek |
| 2013 | Wonderful Mama | Kim Young-yi |
| 2013 | Shining Romance | Lee Tae-ri |
| 2014 | What Happens to My Family? | Heo Yang-geum |
| 2014 | Dodohara | Hong Ha-ra's mother (cameo) |
| 2016 | Beautiful Gong Shim | Yeom Tae-hee (Seok Joon-soo's mother) |
| 2017 | Revolutionary Love | Jung Yeo-jin (Byun Hyuk's mother) |
| 2018 | Gangnam Scandal | Jang Mi-ri |
| 2020 | Backstreet Rookie | Kim Hye-ja (Yeon-joo's mother) |
| 2023 | Pandora: Beneath the Paradise | Min Young-hwi |

=== Film ===
| Year | Title | Role |
|---|---|---|
| 1988 | Dangerous Scent (Married Couple) | Ji-sook |
| 1989 | I Want to Cry | |
| 2009 | Running Turtle | Detective Jo's wife |

== Theater ==
| Year | Title | Role |
|---|---|---|
| 1994 | 남편을 죽이는 서른가지방법 | |

== Discography ==
| Album information | Track listing |
|---|---|
| Happy Women: Released: July 21, 2009; Label: LOEN Entertainment | Track listing: 1. 행복한 여자; 2. 내 하나의 사람은 가고; 3. 몰래한 사랑; 4. 사랑밖엔 난 몰라; 5. 얄미운 사람; 6. 갈색추억; 7. 동반자; 8. 애인; 9. 행복한 여자 (Inst.); 10. 행복한 여자 (MR) |

== Awards ==
| Year | Award | Category | Nominated work |
|---|---|---|---|
| 1988 | MBC Drama Awards | Best New Actress | Queen Inhyeon |
| 1988 | MBC Entertainment Awards | Best Newcomer | |
| 2005 | SBS Drama Awards | Excellence Award, Actress in a Serial Drama | Love and Sympathy |
| 2007 | SBS Drama Awards | Excellence Award, Actress in a Serial Drama | Golden Bride |
| 2008 | 42nd Tax Payer's Day | Commendation (given by the Ministry of Strategy and Finance) | —N/a |
