= Jo Jung-eun =

South Korean actress (born 1996)

- Born: March 10, 1996 (age 30); Seoul, South Korea
- Occupation: Actress
- Years active: 2003–present

Korean name
- Hangul: 조정은
- RR: Jo Jeongeun
- MR: Cho Chŏngŭn

Jo Jung-eun (Korean: 조정은; born March 10, 1996) is a South Korean actress. She is known for her role as young Jang-geum in 2003 TV series Dae Jang Geum.

== Filmography ==
=== Film ===
Year	Title	Role	Notes
2003	The Crescent Moon		
2012	Wonderful Radio	Da-hee	

=== Television ===
Year	Title	Role	Notes
2003	Something About 1%	Yu-jin	
2003	Jewel in the Palace	young Jang-geum	
2007–08	The King and I	young Deul-yi	
2010	Joseon X-Files	Sook-mi	
2010	Bread, Love and Dreams	young Yu-kyung	
2011	Vampire Prosecutor	Hyun-joo	cameo, ep. 5
2011–12	Insu, the Queen Mother	Queen Jeongsun	
2012	Ugly Cake	Lee Se-jin	one–episode special
2013	Two Weeks		
2018	Sweet Revenge 2	Park Saem-na	
