= Sanggung =

Historical Korean title for women

- Hangul: 상궁
- Hanja: 尙宮
- RR: sanggung
- MR: sanggung

Sanggung was an official title of the senior 5th rank (Hanja: 正五品; Jeong 5 pum), the highest attainable for palace ladies during the Joseon period. Female officials with the title were assigned to govern the inner affairs of the palace. When a regular nain served for more than 15 years, she would be awarded with an ornamental hairpin for a sanggung. Therefore, a newly appointed sanggung was usually 35–45 years old. A court lady at the rank of sanggung was treated well enough to live in her own house with servants.

The title first appears in Goryeosa ('History of Goryeo'), a compiled book about the Goryeo period. In the chapter of the book titled Baekgwanji (Hanja: 百官志), regarding all official titles, there were posts named sanggung (Hanja: 尙宮, managing the palace), sangchim (Hanja: 尙寢, managing bedding), sangsik (Hanja: 尙食 managing food), and another sangchim (Hanja: 尙針, managing sewing) during the reign of King Hyeonjong. The book also has another record that Lady Han was appointed as sanggung in March 1031, the 22nd year of the king's reign. These records prove that the sanggung system had existed since the Goryeo period.

As a system on Naemyŏngbu (Hanja: 內命婦) which refers to women at court with a rank including queen and lady-in-waiting was revised since the start of the Joseon period, female officers with the title, sanggung began to manage inner affairs of the court in general as the highest position of the gunggwan (literally a palace officer). The Naemyŏngbu was largely divided into naegwan (literally 'internal offices') and gunggwan according to Kyŏngguk taejŏn. The former refers to a king's concubines or a crown prince's consort while gunggwan are female officers with a rank.

The social status of sanggung generally belonged to the yangin (common people) class, distinguished from naegwan in policy.

== Types of sanggung ==
- Jejo sanggung (Hanja: 提調尙宮) – also called Keunbang sanggung. They had the highest position among Kungnyŏ, and they were responsible for the management of properties. They served the king with many other ladies-in-waiting in his palace, received the king's orders and held political power.
- Bujejo sanggung (Hanja: 副提調尙宮) – also called Arigo sanggung (Hanja: 阿里庫尙宮); they managed the properties in the warehouse of the palace.
- Jimil sanggung (Hanja: 至密尙宮) – also called Daeryeong sanggung (Hanja: 待令尙宮); they waited closely on the king.
- Bomo sanggung (Hanja: 保姆尙宮) – literally 'a nurse sanggung'; they took care of the princes and princesses.
- Sinyeo sanggung (Hanja: 侍女尙宮) – literally 'a maid-in-waiting sanggung'; they assisted jimil saggung with books and ceremony.
- Gamchal sanggung (Hanja: 監察尙宮) – literally 'an inspector sanggung'; they inspected and gave out punishments to kungnyŏ.

== See also ==
- Korean royal court cuisine
