= Bring Me Home (film) =

- Hangul: 나를 찾아줘
- RR: Nareul chajajwo
- MR: Narŭl ch'ajajwŏ
- Directed by: Kim Seung-woo
- Screenplay by: Kim Seung-woo
- Produced by: Park Se-joon
- Starring: Lee Young-ae; Yoo Jae-myung; Park Hae-joon; Lee Won-keun
- Cinematography: Lee Mo-gae
- Edited by: Kim Chang-ju
- Production company: 26 Company
- Distributed by: Warner Bros. Pictures
- Release date: November 27, 2019 (South Korea)
- Running time: 108 minutes
- Country: South Korea
- Language: Korean
- Box office: US$4.4 million

Bring Me Home (Korean: 나를 찾아줘; RR: Nareul chajajwo) is a 2019 South Korean drama thriller film written and directed by first-time director Kim Seung-woo and stars Lee Young-ae and Yoo Jae-myung. It debuted in the Discovery program of 2019 Toronto International Film Festival.

== Plot ==
Jung-yeon (Lee Young-ae) has been searching relentlessly for her son since he disappeared six years ago. One day, she suddenly receives an anonymous tip-off about his whereabouts that leads her to a fishing village. However, the villagers say they have never seen a child similar to the police officer Hong Kyung-jang (Yoo Jae-myung), who seems to be wary of her appearance. Jung-yeon, who senses that they are hiding something, does not give up and begins to search for the truth.

== Cast ==
- Lee Young-ae as Jung-yeon
- Yoo Jae-myung as Police corporal Hong
- Park Hae-joon as Myung-gook
- Lee Won-keun as Seung-hyun
- Kim Gook-hee as Jin-wook's mother
- Kim Yi-kyung as Nurse
- Lee Hang-na as Ahn Kyung-ja
