= Uinyeo Dae Jang Geum =

Upcoming South Korean television series

- Hangul: 의녀 대장금
- Hanja: 醫女 大長今
- Lit.: Medicine Woman Dae Jang-geum
- RR: Uinyeo Dae Janggeum
- MR: Ŭinyŏ Tae Changgŭm
- Genre: Sageuk
- Starring: Lee Young-ae
- Country of origin: South Korea
- Original language: Korean

Production
- Production company: Fantagio

Uinyeo Dae Jang Geum (Korean: 의녀 대장금) is an upcoming South Korean television series starring Lee Young-ae in her titular role. It follows the story of Jang-geum, who became the first female physician of the king.

As of October 2026, the production has faced delays amid broader corporate funding adjustments and programming negotiations.

== Cast and characters ==
- Lee Young-ae as Jang-geum, an uinyeo

== Production ==
=== Development ===
In June 2023, Fantagio announced that Lee Young-ae signed a contract to star in a drama which set to air in 2025.

In January 2024, Kim Tae-ho of DealSite reported that Fantagio plans to invest ₩15.1 billion, or nearly 75% of the funding, into the 24-episode historical series. On the same month, Fantagio has recently sealed a contract with a writer for the series and film shooting would begin in October 2024, with the goal to air sometime in 2025. In February, a Fantagio representative clarified that the series "is a completely different and unrelated project" and "a new fictional story based on the historical figure Dae Jang-geum and her history, it does not feature the return of the character from the previous drama".

=== Casting ===
Fantagio announced that Lee Young-ae will reprise her popular character for the series. Some of the main actors have been confirmed to appear.
