= Ŭinyŏ =

Historical female physicians in Korea

- Hangul: 의녀
- Hanja: 醫女
- RR: uinyeo
- MR: ŭinyŏ

Ŭinyŏ (Korean: 의녀; Hanja: 醫女; lit. '"medicine women"') were female physicians who specialized in the treatment of women during the Joseon period (1392 – 1910) of Korea. The ŭinyŏ were established as a solution to social taboos against women receiving treatment from male physicians. The ŭinyŏ system first appeared in 1406 after King Taejong ordered its establishment in the Jesaengwon (濟生院 health care centers for commoners).

== Establishment ==
The proposal for establishing ŭinyŏ originated with Heo Do (許道), a government officer who held the title of Jijesaengwonsa (知濟生院事). He suggested to the king that a number of intelligent young women should receive medical training to treat women. It's been reported in the Annals of the Joseon Dynasty during the Sejong Era, that he suggested this implementation of male doctors because of discrimination between the genders; he stated that even if a male is a slave of another slave, he would still be treated. He expressed his concern at how there could even be a male doctor that would feel ashamed when looking at a female patient and ultimately refuse to treat her.

Although the ŭinyŏ system started to practice medicine, it was deeply related to a Korean traditional custom at the time. Various religions with gender segregation had a large impact on influencing this settlement of the female doctor system. Along with Buddhism, Daoism, and Shamanism, the Joseon dynasty was generally a strict Confucian state and strengthened the distinction between the sexes which was called naeoe (內外; sex segregation). Free contact between the genders was highly controversial and prohibited for some time despite the government's encouragement to do otherwise for medical purposes. Therefore, there were also many cases in which female patients died without receiving proper treatment because they felt ashamed of being examined by a male doctor. Heo Do understood this discrepancy where women did not want to be examined by male doctors and how male doctors did not want to examine women. Although Heo Do was able to influence the king's decision on establishing this female medical system, in the beginning, the only women able to practice medicine were government maidservants. As a result, these women needed to be educated within the palace and later could be sent anywhere that the government wished them to go. However, because they were maidservants, this also meant that they would not be able to quit practicing should they want to.

It was recorded in the Joseon Analects that Heo Do had been recorded stating,

When a man is seven years old, a man and a woman are not together, and they do not eat.
This is because the saints want to avoid discrimination between men and women. If a man is already made of temperament, he cannot be sick. Even if he is the slave of the slave, there is no one who does not cure him. I am deeply worried that there is a man who is ashamed of seeing what he is seeing, and therefore, does not rule over the sickness at the end of his life. Ask them to put a female doctor in Taejongjo and immediately ask a doctor in Seoul to choose for each institution... The only thing is that women in the palace and the women in the outskirts are not able to have these benefits for their own; so what is a deficit in political reformism? God is. Send them to Seoul to teach bed acupuncture and medicines preparation, and those who have mastered the technique of drinking will be sent to the road hall, and the sickness of the women in the area will be fixed. God is the one who wrote on the previous day, 'Wait for the good harvest, and then do it.' God's thoughts are indecisive; I wonder if God is going to pick up a whole country because of the one-year spoilage that the Yin-Yang balance is in a bad condition.

In a deep religiously-rooted nation, it was believed that God was always reinforcing political decisions and that the many sicknesses plaguing the nation was a result of a disruption in the Yin-Yang balance caused by God's indecisiveness. As a result, Heo Do reasoned that the God's indecisiveness is what caused discrimination between men and women although unintentional. Because of the shame between the two sexes, men will always have no reason to worry even if he's of the lowest caste simply because he is a man and men were doctors. Women, on the other hand, were at great risk due to the shame of showing herself to a man and because of the man who is ashamed of viewing a woman.

After some time, commoners were able to have the option of practicing medicine, however jungin (middle-class people) and sangmin (commoners) did not want to become ŭinyŏ, so either way, young women who belonged to stores and offices in the palace as maidservants were trained in medicine for this purpose.

== Medical training and practice ==
The Jesaengwon chose ŭinyŏ and taught Maijing (脈經; Pulse Classic), acupuncture, and moxibustion.

In July 1434, the 16th year of Sejong the Great's reign, the government gave uninyeo of Jesaengwon a stipend of rice twice a year as an incentive, based upon precedents of payments to female slaves. In February 1498, the 9th year of the King Seongjong, Yejo (Ministry of Rites) revised six clauses of law to codify a system that divided ŭinyŏ into the three grades: naeŭinyŏ (inner uineyo), ganbyeong ŭinyŏ (nursing ŭinyŏ), and chohak ŭinyŏ (beginner ŭinyŏ) according to their education grade.

According to records of the Sokdaejeon (續大典, "Supplement to the Nation code") ŭinyŏ were generally divided into two types: naeguk yŏŭi (內局女醫, female physicians at naeuiwon or called naeŭinyŏ) and hyeminseo yeoui (惠民署女醫, female physicians at hyeminseo). The distinction was made to encourage ŭinyŏ since King Yeongjo's reign and had lasted until the end of the Joseon dynasty. While naeŭinyŏ worked in the palace, the other group of ŭinyŏ worked for hyeminseo, the state-sponsored health clinics in certain areas.

== Mobilization as entertainers ==
In the end of King Seongjong's reign, while ŭinyŏ were sent to attend parties and feasts held for official and private occasions, they were not invited along with gisaeng (female entertainers). King Yeonsangun, however, was a tyrant ruler known for enjoying parties changed this practice. In June 1502, the king's 8th year, ŭinyŏ were sent to families who were holding a wedding to investigate marriage presents on the day that the family sent the dowry. The rationale for the investigation was that the rich people wasted money for luxurious wedding items. From that time onward, whenever a feast was held, ŭinyŏ participated openly together with gisaeng, sitting on stone steps to the present of the king. They began to learn music in addition to medicine.

When the successor King Jungjong ascended to the throne, ŭinyŏ served as uigi (medical entertainer) at court officers' parties. After 1510, the fifth year of the King's reign, the government prohibited ŭinyŏ from attending parties by law several times and forced them to go back to their original mission in medicine. In spite of this effort, the once strict morality was not rectified, and ŭinyŏ still attended parties. At feasts, ŭinyŏ who worked at naeuiwon (royal health clinic) wore a garima (a crown) made with black silk, while gisaeng wore a black po on their head. As ŭinyŏ who belonged to hyeminseo (clinics for the public) were called "yakbang gisaeng" (entertainers of the medicine room) they were regarded the first rated entertainers over other female official entertainers assigned to government offices.

Due to their lowborn origin, ŭinyŏ did not gain the same social status as male doctors and barely retained their existence as a group of the lowest class of society.

== See also ==
- Gungnyeo
- Kisaeng
- Musuri
- Heo Jun
- Traditional Korean medicine
- Janggeum
