= Fireworks (2000 TV series) =

2000 South Korean television series

- Hangul: 불꽃
- RR: Bulkkot
- MR: Pulkkot
- Genre: Melodrama
- Written by: Kim Soo-hyun
- Directed by: Jeong Eul-young
- Starring: Lee Young-ae; Lee Geung-young; Cha In-pyo; Jo Min-su
- Country of origin: South Korea
- Original language: Korean

Original release
- Network: SBS TV
- Release: February 2 – May 18, 2000

Fireworks (Korean: 불꽃) is a South Korean television series produced and broadcast by SBS from 2 February to 18 May 2000.

== Synopsis ==
Ji-hyun, a television screenwriter, meets plastic surgeon Kang-wook while on a trip to Thailand. Kang-wook is about to marry a dermatologist named Min-kyung, while Ji-hyun is engaged to Jong-hyuk, a second generation chaebol. A forbidden love forms between Ji-hyun and Kang-wook, and the drama explores the conflict between the two, with their existing lovers and each other.

== Cast ==
- Lee Young-ae as Kim Ji-hyun
- Lee Geung-young as Lee Kang-wook
- Cha In-pyo as Choi Jong-hyuk
- Jo Min-su as Huh Min-kyung
- Jang Seo-hee as Na Hyun-kyung
- Kim Na-woon as So Yoo-ja
- Jung Hye-sun as Ji-hyun's mother
- Baek Il-seob as Ji-hyun's father
- Seo Woo-rim as Madam Seo
- Kang Boo-ja as Madam Noh
- Park Geun-hyung as Choi Chang-soon
- Kim Bok-hee as Kang-wook's mother
- Shin Choong-sik as Kang-wook's father
- Kim Hae-sook as Min-kyung's aunt
- Choi Sang-hoon as Lee Kang-shik
- Yang Mi-kyung as Cho-hee
- Song Sun-mi as Heo Min-ji
- Maeng Sang-hoon as Coach Jung
- Won Ki-joon as Park Han-soo
- Song Young-chang
- Choi Soo-rin
- Kim Min-sang
- Lee Jong-rae
- Yoo Ji-yun

== Production ==
Fireworks was written by Kim Soo-hyun, and was his first work of the new millennium. Jeong Eul-young, who Kim had previously worked with in Men of the Bath House, directed the series. The script was written as filming progressed with no concrete synopsis. Early filming took place in Thailand starting from 15 January 2000, in spots like downtown Bangkok and Pattaya Beach.

== Ratings and reception ==
Fireworks was initially unsuccessful—its first episode achieved ratings of 10.7%, a low for the time. The series' low ratings were attributed to popularity of MBC's Truth, which aired in the same timeslot. Early episodes drew criticism from viewers, who found the development of Ji-hyun and Kang-wook's relationship implausible and thought Lee Geung-young and Lee Young-ae unfit for their roles. After staying on an average rating of 15%, the drama passed the 20% mark for the first time with its 10th episode. The final episode exceeded the 30% mark with a 36.7%, the show's highest rating yet. Audiences were critical of its ending, which was panned as unrealistic. The Citizens' Coalition for Democratic Media picked Fireworks as the worst program of April 2000, proclaiming that the show depicted "a twisted view of love".
