= Musuri =

Female Korean court slaves

- Hangul: 무수리
- RR: musuri
- MR: musuri

Musuri is a Korean term referring to female slaves in charge of odd chores in the court during the Goryeo and Joseon Dynasty of Korea. Their main tasks were miscellaneous works such as drawing water from a well, making a fire in the fireplace or cleaning.

== Etymology ==
Every palace had wells, and drawing water and delivering it as needed were an important part of a tomusuri's duty. For this reason, musuri were also called susa (水賜, literally "giving water") or susai (水賜伊, a female in charge of giving water) and their residence was called a susagan (水賜間, a place for those drawing water). On the other hand, male slaves were called paji (巴只). Although the terms, susai and paji do not appear in Goryeosa, a book compiled about the "History of Goryeo", the Annals of King Taejong (Taejong sillok) mention the class. From this record the Joseon royal court followed the system of the former state; Goryeo, young boys designated as male slaves were called paji, in charge of cleaning in the court, while female slaves were called susai. The record indicates that the system of susai and paji existed since the Goryeo Dynasty.

The term musuri was originally used in the Mongol court, so it is assumed that the term came into use in the late Goryeo period. At first musuri travelled in and out of the court, but King Taejong changed the system to prevent their spreading court affairs. Since December 1411 in the lunar calendar, the musuri stayed at court all the time.

== Roles and class ==
As well as drawing water musuri were assigned all rough work, according to each office's character.

They were from the public, mostly married women, and entered the palace through a nain's recommendation. In a broad sense, musuri were part of the gungnyeo (court ladies), but they could be allowed to go out of the court, which differentiates them from the gungnyeo with a rank, who entered the place in their early age and had "gwallye" (冠禮, coming-of-age ceremonies). Thus the musuri were maids to assist gungnyeo at court and belonged to the lowest class in society. In an exception to the class system it was said that King Yeongjo (r. 1724–76) was born to King Sukjong and Consort Suk of the Choe clan, who had been a musuri at Queen Inhyeon's (仁顯王后) quarters. King Yeongjo was very sensitive about his mother's class during his lifetime, avoiding any mention of her humble origin.

== Attire ==
Musuri wore a somber ensemble made with a blackish cotton with some red. They rolled up their hair into a cushion shape and wore a wide belt made of the same fabric as their clothes, with a tag (pae, 牌) on it. The tag was equivalent to an identification card when they came to work from outside, or went on an errand between buildings in the palace. At that time, nain (assistant court ladies) and yangban (noble women) wore a very short upper garment called a donggeungnae jeogori (동그래저고리), a variety of jeogori, but the length of a musuri's jeogori was long, just like that of male slaves.

== See also ==
- Cheonmin
- Charwoman
- Lady-in-waiting
- Dae Jang Geum
