= Lee Young-ae =

South Korean actress (born 1971)

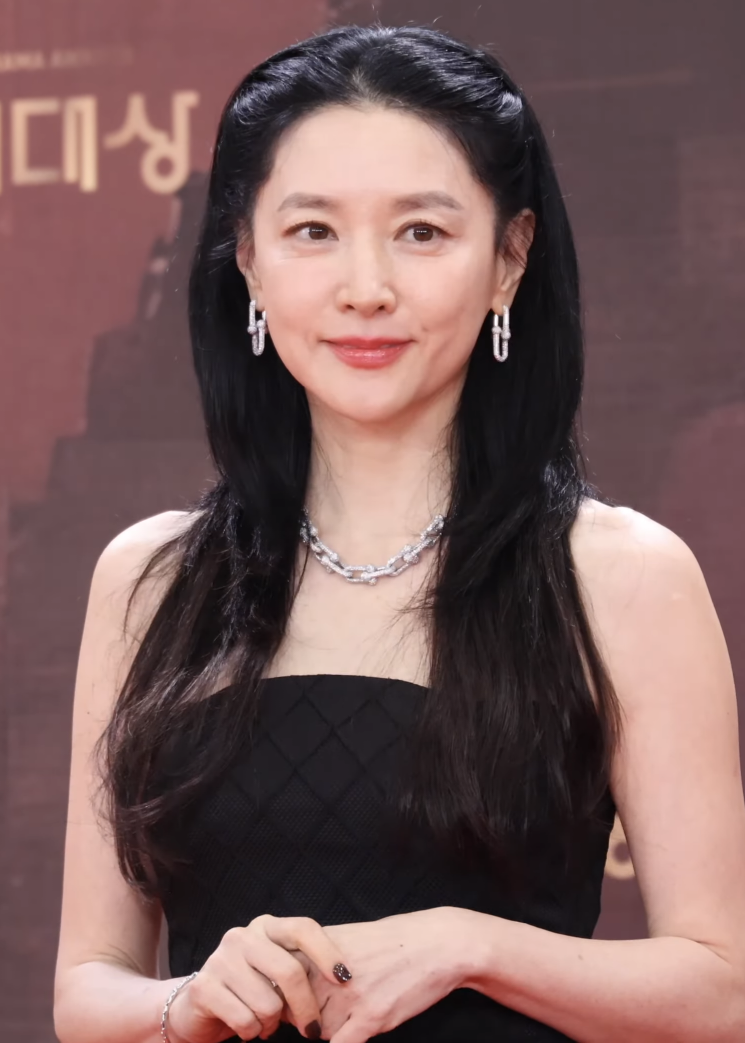
- Lee in December 2025
- Born: January 31, 1971 (age 55); Seoul, South Korea
- Education: Hanyang University (BA); Chung-Ang University (MA)
- Occupations: Actress; model
- Years active: 1991–2005; 2017–present
- Agent: Good People Entertainment (Note: A subsidiary of Creative Leaders Group Eight.)
- Height: 165 cm (5 ft 5 in)
- Spouse: Jeong Ho-yeong (m. 2009)
- Children: 2

Korean name
- Hangul: 이영애
- Hanja: 李英愛
- RR: I Yeongae
- MR: I Yŏngae
- Website: group8.co.kr

Lee Young-ae (Korean: 이영애; born January 31, 1971) is a South Korean actress. She is best known for her appearances in the historical drama Jewel in the Palace (2003), in Hur Jin-ho's film One Fine Spring Day (2001), in Park Chan Wook's films Joint Security Area (2000) and Lady Vengeance (2005). For her performance in the latter, she received Best Actress awards at the 38th Sitges Film Festival, 26th Blue Dragon Film Awards and 42nd Baeksang Arts Awards.

== Career ==
Lee made her debut as a model in 1991. After appearing in television commercials, she debuted as an actress in the 1993 drama How's Your Husband?, which won her Best New Actress at the SBS Drama Awards.

In 2000, she starred in the mystery thriller film Joint Security Area, which became the highest-grossing Korean film at that time. She followed this with melodrama Last Present, where she received acclaim for her performance as a young woman facing the realities of an early death. Lee reunited with director Hur Jin-ho to star in his next film One Fine Spring Day, which won her Best Actress at the Busan Film Critics Awards. She also starred in the TV series Fireworks, which introduced Lee to Taiwan audiences.

Lee came to prominence in South Korea after starring in the historical drama Jewel in the Palace. It first aired from September 15, 2003, to March 23, 2004, on MBC, where it was the top program with an average viewership rating of 46.3% and a peak of 57.8%, making it the 10th highest rated Korean drama of all time. Lee won the Daesang (Grand Prize) award at the MBC Drama Awards, as well as the Baeksang Arts Award for Best Actress in Television nomination. The show was then aired overseas in 91 countries and became exceptionally popular in Asia.

The fame of Jewel in the Palace launched Lee into pan-Asia stardom as one of the biggest Hallyu stars. She has been invited to visit mainland China, Hong Kong, Taiwan, Singapore and Japan.

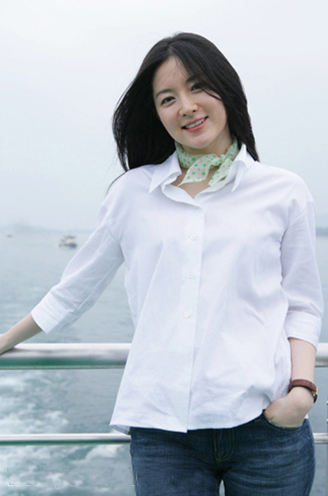
Lee on boat ride at the Qiandao Lake in China in March 2006.

In 2006, for the first time in 12 years, NHK had to use the NHK Hall to host the NHK show due to her popularity; stamps featuring Lee were released in Japan.

She was also invited to the 2007 Harbin International Ice and Snow Sculpture Festival in China.

Lee then starred in the third installment in Park Chan-wook's The Vengeance Trilogy, titled Sympathy For Lady Vengeance. She was awarded Best Actress at the 2005 Blue Dragon Film Awards and 2006 Baeksang Art Awards for her performance in the film.

In 2006, Lee was invited sit on the jury bench of the 56th Berlin International Film Festival, becoming the first Korean actress to be selected as a jury member of the international film festival.

In 2007, she received the Medal of Culture Merit for her contribution to the Korean Wave from the South Korean government.

In 2015, it was announced that Lee would be making her comeback to television in SBS historical series Saimdang, Memoir of Colors. She would be playing dual roles as Shin Saimdang, a famed Joseon-era artist and calligrapher as well as a modern-day Korean history lecturer. The drama premiered in January 2017.

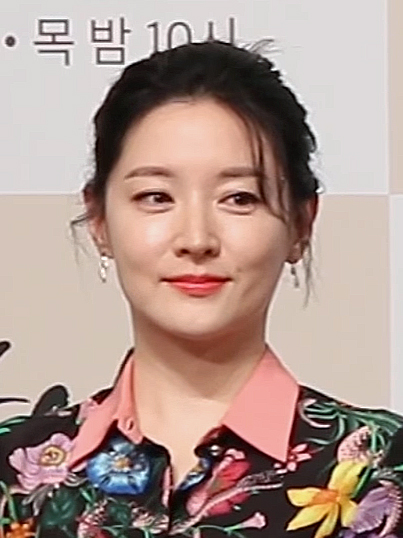
At the press conference of Saimdang, Memoir of Colors, January 2017

In 2018, Lee was cast in the film Bring Me Home, returning to the big screen after 13 years.

In 2022, Lee was invited to be the jury member of the 27th Busan International Film Festival's Actor of the Year Award.

In 2023, she came back to the small screen with the leading role in Maestra: Strings of Truth, playing Cha Se-eum, a world-renowned orchestra conductor who keeps a big, dangerous secret.

== Other ventures ==
=== Philanthropy ===
Besides her acting career, Lee has been involved with several charities. In 1997, she went to Ethiopia as a NGO Goodwill Ambassador. She went to Thar Desert in 1999 to do a TV show about people in India's lowest social caste. Later in 2001, she described these experiences in her autobiography "A Most Special Love" with partial English and donated the income from the sale of the book to charity.

She was appointed a goodwill ambassador in 2004 by UNICEF and has since held several charity posts. She has made many donations to schools and hospitals, including Chosun First Middle School in Harbin and an elementary school in China that was later renamed Lee Young-Ae Elementary School. In 2012, she served as the celebrity spokesperson for the "Love Donation" project, hosted by the magazine Woman Chosun. She made a donation to build a school in Myanmar.

In 2012, Lee launched a business for organic and eco-friendly products for children in Seoul.

In July 2014, Taiwanese media reported that Lee had privately assisted a pregnant Taiwanese woman vacationing with her husband in Seoul. The woman gave birth to a girl prematurely and the infant had several complications. Lee found out about the couple through her friend and decided to pay their medical bills of NT$4 million (US$134,000) because the infant required two surgeries and constant medical care after she was born. Lee was subsequently given an award by Taiwan's Chou Ta-Kuan Cultural and Educational Foundation. In 2016, she helped a Vietnamese girl who went to Korea to treat her brain tumor by donating 37 million won for the operation and other medical bills.

In Sri Lanka, she is known as "Changumi" (Sinhala: චංගුමී), and her popularity there led to the creation of the Sujatha Diyani Scholarship Fund in 2014, when she donated US$100,000. The fund aims at providing financial assistance to female students from low-income families. Lee also became the first actress to join the "Chime for Change" campaign of Gucci to "raise funds and awareness for projects promoting education, health, and justice for girls and women" around the world.

In 2015, Lee was appointed special envoy by the UNESCO Korean Commission. She promotes the commission's activities such as fundraising and a campaign to render educational support to underdeveloped countries.

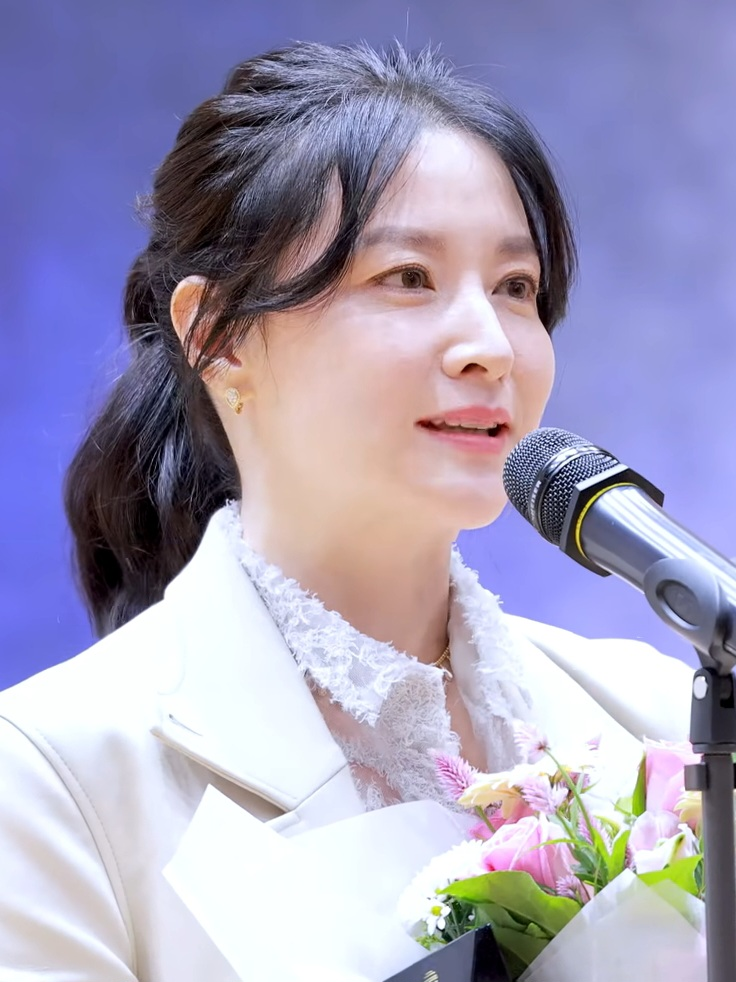
Lee in September 2022

In March 2022, Lee donated 100 million won to Ukraine, which was damaged by the Russian invasion, along with a letter of consolation to the people of Ukraine.

On May 1, 2022, Lee donated 100 million won to the Sowon Foundation Office in Yangpyeong City Gyeonggi-do Province to assist patients who have difficulty getting out of the house due to childhood cancer or rare diseases.

On August 19, 2022, Lee donated ₩100 million to help those affected by the 2022 South Korean floods through the Korea Foundation for the Disabled.

On November 3, 2022, Lee made a donation to help the victims of the Seoul Halloween crowd crush through donations to Korea Welfare Foundation for the Disabled.

On January 22, 2023, Lee donated 50 million won to residents affected by the fire in Guryong Village, Gangnam District, Seoul.

In September 2023, Lee donated 50 million won to Syngman Rhee, President of the Founder's Memorial Association to build a memorial to former president Syngman Rhee.

In November 2023, Lee donated ₩50 million to aid humanitarian efforts for children hurt in the Gaza war, the Korean Red Cross announced on 21.

=== Endorsements ===
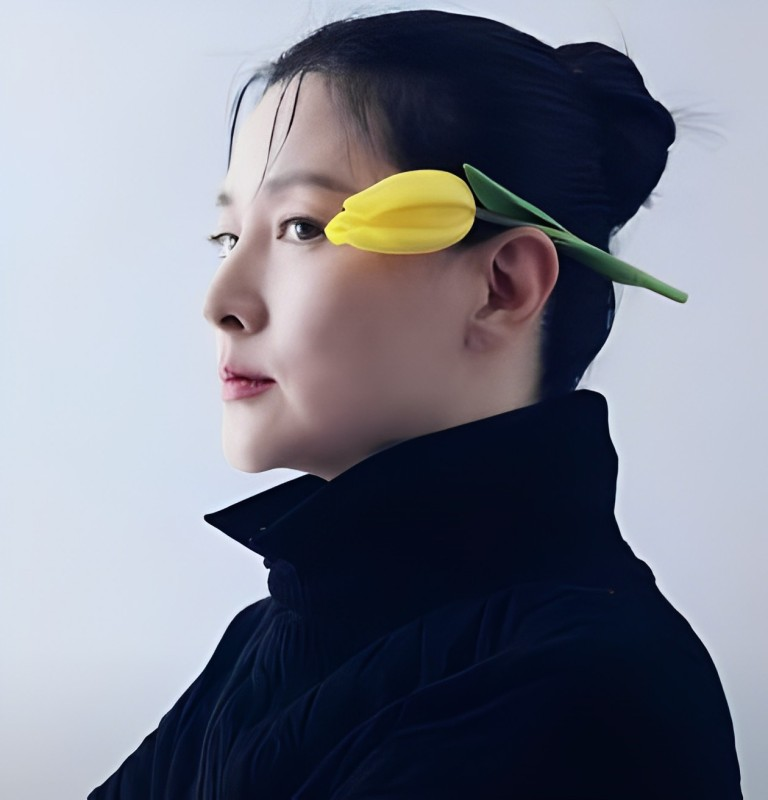
Lee in a fashion film featuring Balenciaga for Marie Claire Korea in February 2021

In 1991, Lee made her debut as a rookie model, became known through a TV commercial for Pacific Chemical's (now Amore Pacific) cosmetics brand Mamonde. Her urban image with her raised hair and trench coat collar left a strong impression on viewers, and Lee, who was studying German Language and Literature at Hanyang University at that moment, rose to stardom with the moniker "Oxygen Lady", which was the catchphrase of the commercial. At that time, Mamonde became the most successful brand in the history of Pacific Chemical. The product Tropic Orange Makeup, which was released in March 1994, achieved a record of selling 1.5 million units in two months. Due to the popularity of Mamonde and Lee, competitors also poured out advertisements with a similar concept in 1997. She had been the face of Mamonde for 10 years.

Since 2007, Lee became the global ambassador of LG Household & Health Care's super-premium beauty brand The History of Whoo until now.

In February 2014, Lee became the cover face of the February issue of Marie Claire Korea magazine to promote the Trinity, Paris Nouvelle Vague, Destinée and Caresse d'Orchidées de Cartier collection of French luxury jewellery brand Cartier. In January 2017, Lee became the cover face of the February issue of Elle Korea magazine to promote the Spring - Summer 2017 collection of Italian luxury fashion house Valentino. In January 2021, she was the cover face of the February issue of Marie Claire Korea to represent the Spring - Summer 2021 collection of Spanish-French luxury fashion house Balenciaga. She appeared on the cover of Noblesse Magazine June 2021 Issue to present the Van Cleef & Arpels's Palmyre, Treasure of Rubies, The Snowflake, Arche de Noé, Pierres de Caractères and Les Ateliers Créations high jewelry collection and the bag line for French luxury leather goods brand Fauré Le Page. In September 2021, she appeared on the cover of Dazed Korea Fall 2021 Edition Issue to present the Aria Fall/Winter 2021 collection and the Diana bag line for Italian luxury brand Gucci. She also appeared in Vogue Korea's December 2023 issue to represent the Fred Joaillier's The High Jewelry collections Monsieur Fred Inner Light. In the Arena Homme + Korea April 2024 issue, for which she was the cover star, Lee represented the Bottega Veneta Spring/Summer 2024 ready-to-wear collection. In June 2024, she appeared on the cover of W Korea's July issue of W Edition supplement book to represent the High Jewelry Awakened Hands, Awakened Minds Collection of French luxury house Louis Vuitton. In July 2024, Lee appeared on the cover of the August issue of Harper's Bazaar Korea to promote the Pre-Fall 2024 Collection by American luxury fashion brand Ralph Lauren. In February 2025, Lee appeared on the cover of the March issue of Vogue Korea to promote the Spring Summer 2025 Collection by Italian luxury fashion brand Gucci.

In 2020, Lee had been selected as Korean ambassador for Ferragamo Eyewear.

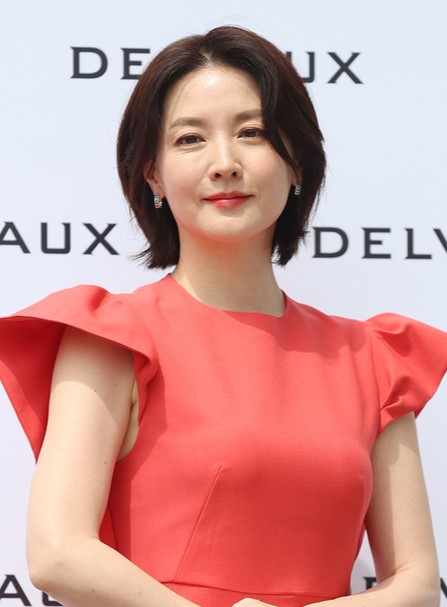
Lee during a Delvaux photo call in May 2023

In July 2022, she was selected as the model for the new product Lifening Beauty Collagen Ampoule of the inner beauty brand Lifening. In May 2023, Lee was announced to become exclusive brand model for South Korean skin care medical device company Jeisys Medical, which she would be represented for its high-frequency medical device Density. In July 2024, Integration Corp selected Lee as brand model for its Korean medicine brand The Soo.

== Personal life ==
In 2009, Lee married Jeong Ho-young, a Korean-American businessman 20 years her senior. On February 20, 2011, she gave birth to fraternal twins, a boy and a girl.

== Filmography ==
=== Films ===
Film appearances
Year	Title	Role	Notes	Ref.
1996	Insyalla	Lee Hyang		
1998	First Kiss	Min-joo	Cameo	
2000	Joint Security Area	Maj. Sophie E. Jean		
2001	Last Present	Park Jung-yeon		
2001	One Fine Spring Day	Han Eun-soo		
2005	Lady Vengeance	Lee Geum-ja		
2019	Bring Me Home	Seo Jung-yeon		

=== Television series ===
Television series appearances
Year	Title	Role	Notes	Ref.
1993	How's Your Husband?	Do Do-hee		
1994	Dash	Oh Jeong-eun		
1995	Love and Marriage	Oh Eun-ji		
1995	Asphalt Man	Dong-hee		
1995	West Palace	Kim Gae-shi / Gae-Ttong		
1996	Papa	Han Sae-young		
1996	Their Embrace	Kim Seung-hye		
1996	Sibling Relations	Park Yong-ja		
1997	Medical Brothers	Cha Min-ju		
1997	The Reason I Live	Ae-suk		
1997	Because I Love You	Eo Yu-na		
1998	Romance	Han Ji-sook		
1998	Advocate	Lee Eun-ji		
1999	Enbireyong	Seon-hye		
1999	Invitation	Choi Young-joo		
1999	The Wave	Na Yoon-sook		
2000	Fireworks	Kim Ji-hyun		
2003–2004	Jewel in the Palace	Seo Jang-geum		
2017	Saimdang, Memoir of Colors	Shin Saimdang / Seo Ji-yoon		
2018	Gangnam Beauty	Herself	Cameo (episode 1)	
2021–2026	Taxi Driver	Narrator	Voice appearance	
2021	Inspector Koo	Koo Kyung-yi		
2023–2024	Maestra: Strings of Truth	Cha Se-eum		
2025	Walking On Thin Ice	Kang Eun-soo		
TBA	Uinyeo Dae Jang Geum	Jang-geum		

=== Television shows ===
Year	Title	Role	Notes	Ref.
2022	Docu Prime - Children's Rights	Narrator	children's human rights documentary narration	

== Accolades ==
=== Awards and nominations ===
Year	Award	Category	Nominated work	Result	Ref.
1994	SBS Drama Awards	Best New Actress	How's Your Husband?	Won	
1995	KBS Drama Awards	Popularity Award	West Palace	Won	
1996	MBC Drama Awards	Excellence Award, Actress	Their Embrace, Sibling Relations	Nominated	
1997	MBC Drama Awards	Excellence Award, Actress	The Reason I Live	Won	
1998	SBS Drama Awards	Top Excellence Award, Actress	Romance	Won	
1999	KBS Drama Awards	Excellence Award, Actress	Invitation	Nominated	
1999	KBS Drama Awards	Popularity Award	Invitation	Won	
2000	SBS Drama Awards	Big Star Awards	Fireworks	Won	
2000	SBS Drama Awards	Top Excellence Award, Actress	Fireworks	Nominated	
2000	21st Blue Dragon Film Awards	Best Actress	Joint Security Area	Nominated	
2001	37th Baeksang Arts Awards	Best Actress (Film)	Joint Security Area	Nominated	
2001	2nd Korea Movie & Music Awards	Photogenic Prize for Actress	Joint Security Area	Won	
2001	38th Grand Bell Awards	Best Actress	Last Present	Nominated	
2001	Cine21 Film Awards	Best Actress	One Fine Spring Day, Last Present	Won	
2001	2nd Busan Film Critics Awards	Best Actress	One Fine Spring Day	Won	
2001	22nd Blue Dragon Film Awards	Best Actress	One Fine Spring Day	Nominated	
2002	38th Baeksang Arts Awards	Best Actress (Film)	One Fine Spring Day	Nominated	
2002	39th Grand Bell Awards	Best Actress	One Fine Spring Day	Nominated	
2002	25th Golden Cinema Film Festival	Most Popular Actress	Last Present	Won	
2003	MBC Drama Awards	Grand Prize (Daesang)	Jewel in the Palace	Won	
2003	MBC Drama Awards	Top Excellence Award, Actress	Jewel in the Palace	Nominated	
2004	40th Baeksang Arts Awards	Best Actress (TV)	Jewel in the Palace	Nominated	
2004	2nd Andre Kim Best Star Awards	Female Star Award	—N/a	Won	
2005	Hong Kong Government Broadcasting Award	Hong Kong People's Choice	—N/a	Won	
2005	China Synsis Bao	Most Influential Foreign Star	—N/a	3rd place	
2005	26th Blue Dragon Film Awards	Best Actress	Lady Vengeance	Won	
2005	4th Korean Film Awards	Best Actress	Lady Vengeance	Nominated	
2005	8th Director's Cut Awards	Best Actress	Lady Vengeance	Won	
2005	38th Sitges Film Festival	Best Actress	Lady Vengeance	Won	
2005	13th Chunsa Film Art Awards	Best Actress	Lady Vengeance	Nominated	
2006	38th Cinemanila International Film Festival	Best Actress	Lady Vengeance	Won	
2006	43rd Grand Bell Awards	Best Actress	Lady Vengeance	Nominated	
2006	43rd Grand Bell Awards	Korean Wave Popularity Award	Lady Vengeance	Won	
2006	42nd Baeksang Arts Awards	Best Actress (Film)	Lady Vengeance	Won	
2007	15th Chunsa Film Festival	Korean Wave Contribution Award	—N/a	Won	
2007	3rd Andre Kim Best Star Awards	Grand Prize	—N/a	Won	
2007	1st Hallyu Awards	Star (Drama) Award	—N/a	Won	
2007	44th Korean Broadcasters Association Day	Actor Award	—N/a	Won	
2007	Ministry of Culture, Sports and Tourism	Medal of Cultural Merit	—N/a	Won	
2009	5th Andre Kim Best Star Awards	Female Star Award	—N/a	Won	
2015	10th Seoul International Drama Awards	10th Anniversary Hallyu Achievement Award	—N/a	Won	
2017	22nd Consumers Day	Cultural Person Award	Saimdang, Memoir of Colors	Won	
2017	2017 SBS Drama Awards	Top Excellence Award, Actress in a Wed-Thurs Drama	Saimdang, Memoir of Colors	Nominated	
2020	25th Chunsa Film Art Awards	Best Actress	Bring Me Home	Won	
2020	29th Buil Film Awards	Best Actress	Bring Me Home	Nominated	
2021	Cine21 Film Awards	Best Actress of the Year	Inspector Koo	Won	
2022	Bechdel Day 2022	Best Actress	Inspector Koo	Won	
2022	National Brand Awards 2022	Hallyu Achievement Award	—N/a	Won	
2024	17th Asian Film Awards	Excellence in Asian Cinema Award	—N/a	Won	
2025	2025 KBS Drama Awards	Grand Prize (Daesang)	Walking on Thin Ice	Nominated	
2025	2025 KBS Drama Awards	Top Excellence Award, Actress	Walking on Thin Ice	Won	
2025	2025 KBS Drama Awards	Best Couple Award (with Kim Young-kwang)	Walking on Thin Ice	Won	
2025	2025 KBS Drama Awards	Excellence Award, Actress in a Miniseries	Walking on Thin Ice	Nominated	
2025	2025 KBS Drama Awards	Popularity Award, Actress	Walking on Thin Ice	Nominated	

=== Listicles ===
Name of publisher, year listed, name of listicle, and placement
Publisher	Year	Listicle	Placement	Ref.
Korean Film Council	2021	Korean Actors 200 (Note: Introduces 200 actors that best represent the present and future of Korean cinema to the people in the film industry all over the world.)	Included	

== Bibliography ==
- Lee Young-ae (April 12, 2001). 아주 특별한 사랑 (in Korean). Seoul: 문학사상사. ISBN 978-89-7012-370-7.
- Lee Young-ae (April 8, 2014). 이영애의 만찬: 한식 문화로 본 우리의 아름다운 음식 이야기 (in Korean). Seoul: 알에이치코리아. ISBN 978-89-2555-267-5.
