= Hyeminseo =

1392–1882 medical institution in Korea

- 혜민서
- Predecessor: Hyeminguk
- Formation: 1392
- Dissolved: 1882
- Coordinates: 37.56623°N 126.98827°E

Korean name
- Hangul: 혜민서
- Hanja: 惠民署
- RR: Hyeminseo
- MR: Hyeminsŏ

Hyeminseo (Korean: 혜민서; Hanja: 惠民署) was the medical authority of the Joseon Dynasty in Seoul (then "Hanseong"), Korea. The officers were in charge of the treatment of commoners and medicine.

In 1392, the year of the foundation of Joseon, the organ was established to succeed the Hyemingoguk (혜민고국; 惠民庫局), the former medical institution of Goryeo. In 1414, its name became Hyeminguk, and then finally changed to the name Hyeminseo in 1466 under the reign of Sejo of Joseon. It was abolished in 1882.

The officers were in charge of producing medicines, teaching, and researching Korean medicine. Generally, four people were put to as the disciplines. Bureaucrats of Hyeminseo were also appointed through the gwageo recruitment examination.

Hyeminseo aimed to benefit the people but its coverage was limited to commoners living in Hanyang. There was another medical authority called Hwarinseo. Collectively, the two were referred to as Yanguisa (양의사; 兩醫司; lit. '"the two medical authorities"').
