= Pujejo =

Joseon-era government official

Pujejo (Korean: 부제조; Hanja: 副提調) refers to the terminology of governmental officer who generally tends to have concurrent seat of central office and control agency especially dedicated to technology and miscellaneous duties.

== History ==
The idea of jejo was firstly used in Song and Yuan dynasty, which arrived in the late Goryeo period. Although Song and Won took the seat as normal affair of government, Goryeo adopted the status largely for unsteady or irregular seats. Therefore, "pujejo" could mean someone in emeritus or temporary worker.

Later in Joseon, the number of jejo officer highly increased as concurrent seats, making out of dojejo and pujejo. Before Gyeongguk daejun was written, there had been dojejo, jejo and Pujejo; each possessed specific hierarchy of government.

According to Gyeongguk daejeon, the number of officers can be found; five for Saongwon, one each for Naeuiwon, Sanguiwon and Jeonokseo, while Seungmunwon did not designate exact number.

== See also ==
- Joseon dynasty
- Joseon dynasty politics
