= Janggeum =

Korean physician (1474–1550)

Dae Janggeum
- 장금
- Born: Janggeum c. 1474; Joseon
- Died: c. 1550 (aged 75–76); Joseon
- Other name: Dae Jang Geum (Great Jang Geum)
- Occupation: Physician
- Years active: c.1513 – c.1550
- Known for: Being the first personal female doctor of a Korean king (Jungjong of Joseon)

Korean name
- Hangul: 장금
- Hanja: 長今
- RR: Janggeum
- MR: Changgŭm

Janggeum (Korean: 장금; Hanja: 長今; fl. early 16th century) was reputedly the first female royal physician in Korean history. She was mentioned 10 times in the Veritable Records of the Joseon Dynasty. It is known that Jungjong of Joseon was pleased with Janggeum's medical knowledge and trusted her with taking care of the royal family. She was granted the use of Dae (Korean: 대; Hanja: 大; RR: Dae; MR: Tae) (which means "great" in Korean) before her first name.

Some sources attest to Janggeum as a real person and it is still a topic of debate among scholars. Janggeum is considered an important person in Korean history, although there is little information about her.

== Mentions in Veritable Records of the Joseon Dynasty ==
Mentions of "Janggeum (長今)", sometimes alongside the title "female doctor" (ŭinyŏ; 醫女), were noted in the Veritable Records of the Joseon Dynasty on 10 occasions:

1. 4 April 1515: Several court officers sent petitions to King Jungjong to severely punish all the ŭinyŏ that had attended to the recently deceased Queen (Queen Janggyeong), including Janggeum. Queen Janggyeong (Jungjong's 2nd wife) died past midnight on 16 March due to post-partum complications resulting from the birth of the legitimate heir (the future King Injong; 10 March). This was the first recorded entry as well as mention of Janggeum's name in the Annals.
2. 5 April 1515: In reply to the above petition, King Jungjong refused: "Janggeum deserved a big credit for her role in the safe childbirth (of the Queen), but I have never rewarded her for her actions until now, because of other affairs. Now you (the court officers) are telling me to punish her because the Queen is dead, but I won't do that as well as I won't reward her."
3. 24 September 1522: Jungjong was recorded to have rewarded the staff of the medical department after the Queen Mother (Queen Jeonghyeon) recovered from an illness. Janggeum (as well as fellow ŭinyŏ Shin-bi) was rewarded 10 sacks of rice & 10 sacks of beans.
4. 8 January 1525: Jungjong commented, after an illness: "[...] However, Dae Janggeum (大長今) was better than any other ŭinyŏ. As a result, she was permitted to look after the King". This was the first recorded instance of the title "dae" (大 "great") attached to Janggeum's name in the Annals.
5. 6 March 1533: Jungjong commented on his state of health: "I have recovered from a sickness of several months. The royal physicians deserve praise and reward. [...] Ŭinyŏ Dae Janggeum and Kye-geum will each be rewarded 15 sacks of rice, 15 sacks of beans, and 10 bolts of cloth."
6. 21 February 1544: Jungjong commented on an order: "I haven't been able to execute my duties for a long time since I caught a cold. A few days ago, I attended an academic seminar (to discuss philosophies), but the cold weather made my condition worse. I already told the royal physicians Park Se-geo and Hong Chim, as well as ŭinyŏ Dae Janggeum, Eun-bi, and the rest to discuss about the prescription with the medical officer-in-charge. [...]"
7. 2 March 1544: In relation to above, Jungjong later recovered from his cold, and was recorded to have rewarded the royal physicians and their staff. Dae Janggeum was rewarded 5 sacks of rice and beans. This was the last record where the title "dae" was affixed to Janggeum's name in the Annals.
8. 9 November 1544: The Annals recorded a conversation between the high-ranking ministers of the court and Janggeum, regarding their enquiry on Jungjong's health. Wherein afterwards the physicians Park Se-geo and Hong Chim examined Jungjong's pulse and prescribed medications. Janggeum was quoted: "His Majesty slept around midnight yesterday, and has also slept for a short time at dawn. He just passed his urine, but has been constipated for around 3 days."
9. 10 November 1544: Jungjong commented (in relation to some relatives sending their written regards for his well-being): "I'm still constipated. What prescription should be made is under discussion. The female physician knows all about my condition," referring to the previous entry, where Janggeum's reply was inserted as a complementary side-note.
10. 13 November 1544: The Annals reported that Jungjong has recovered, which was transmitted to ministers who came by in greeting. Afterwards Jungjong granted all of the medical officers in attendance a holiday. Jungjong particularly mentioned that Janggeum visited him in the morning, and told her that he had passed his stool and that he had felt immense relief. This was the last recorded entry as well as direct mention of Janggeum's name in the Annals. 16 days later (29 November), Jungjong passed away.

== Popular culture ==
- Portrayed by Lee Young-ae in the 2003–2004 MBC TV series Jewel in the Palace.
- Due to the popularity of the MBC TV series Dae Jang Geum, it has become a nickname often used for female idols that are good at cooking.
- Portrayed by Kim Mi-kyung in the 2013 KBS2 TV series The Fugitive of Joseon.
- An upcoming 2025 TV series Uinyeo Dae Jang Geum, which will be portrayed again by Lee Young-ae.

== See also ==
- Joseon Dynasty
