= Dae Jang Geum Theme Park =

Defunct South Korean amusement park

Dae Jang Geum Theme Park (대장금 테마파크)
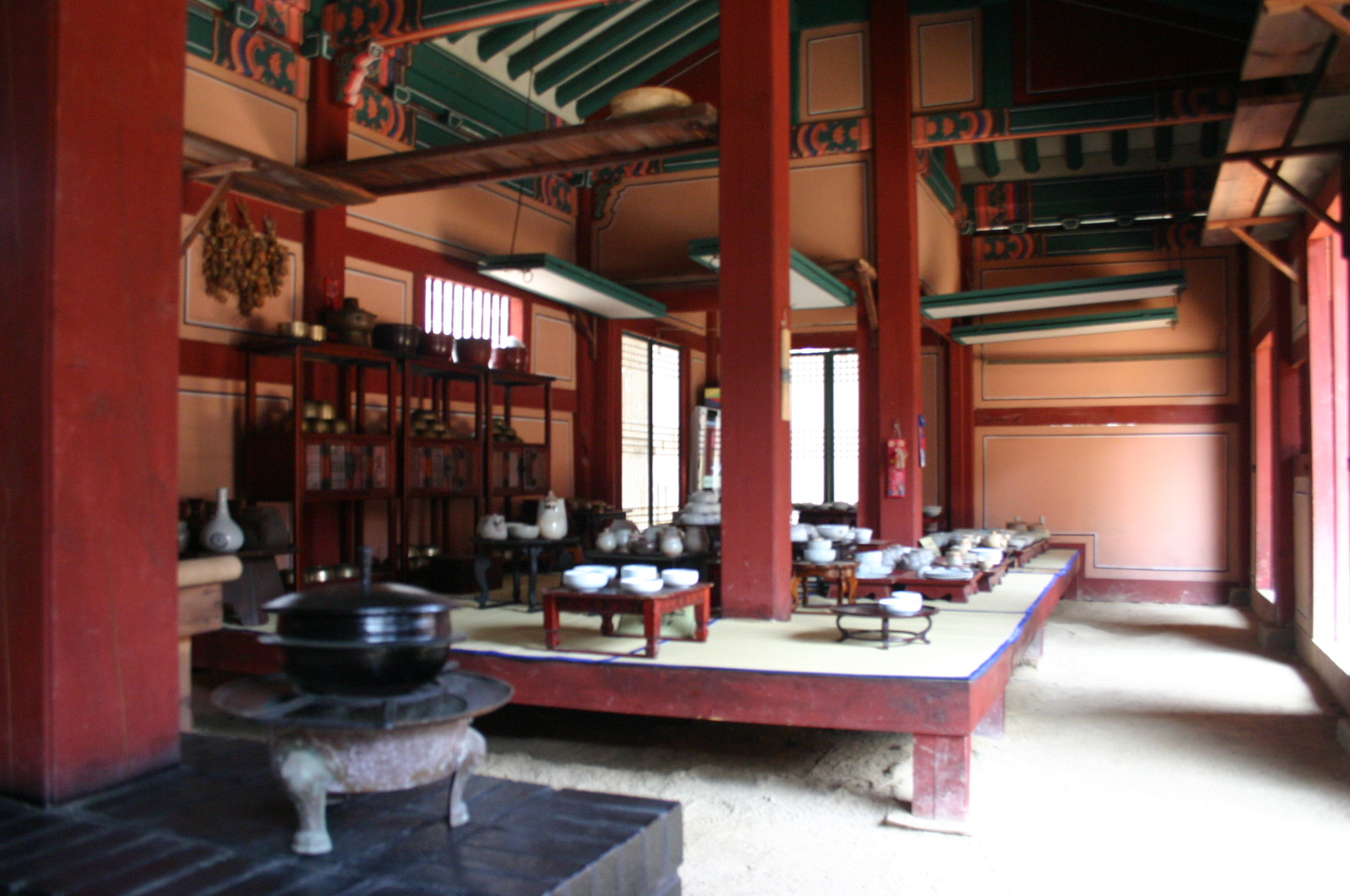
- A film set of the royal kitchen
- Interactive map of Dae Jang Geum Theme Park (대장금 테마파크)
- Location: MBC Yangjoo Culture Valley, Mansong-dong, Yangju, Gyeonggi, South Korea
- Coordinates: 37°47′31.1″N 127°06′04.7″E
- Status: Defunct
- Opened: December 2004
- Closed: January 1, 2014
- Owner: Munhwa Broadcasting Corporation
- Theme: Joseon; Dae Jang Geum
- Area: 2,000 square metres (0.20 ha)
- Website: Dae Jang Geum Theme Park

Dae Jang Geum Theme Park (Korean: 대장금 테마파크) is a restored and renovated outdoor set owned by Munhwa Broadcasting Corporation where most of the Korean drama Dae Jang Geum was filmed.

== History ==
The area of outdoor set is about 2,000 square meters within the MBC Yangjoo Culture Valley which is located in Mansong-dong, Yangju City, Gyeonggi Province. It was once used as a filming location of earlier historical themed dramas such as Hur Jun and Sangdo, Merchants of Joseon, other variety shows were produced there as well, prior to its opening to the public.

== Opening ==
Opened to the public in December 2004, the Dae Jang Geum Theme Park is South Korea's first drama theme park. It was made for spreading Korean Wave and introducing not only Korean culture but Korean court culture.

There are 23 facilities such as Dae Jeon, Dae Bi Jeon, Soo Ra Gan (So Joo Bang), Toi Sun Gan, Oak Sa, Guest house, Sa Ong Won, Brewery and so on. There are also some instruments that was used when the Dae Jang Geum was filmed. Events and experience programs are progressing at this place so that visitors can see and experience various things.

== Closure ==
Due to some damages to its temporal building structures and for visitors' safety reasons, the theme park was closed to the public on January 1, 2014, while it continues on as a filming location for producing future historical themed dramas and variety shows.
