= List of awards and nominations received by Running Man =

Running Man awards and nominations
Awards and nominations
Award	Wins	Nominations
SBS Entertainment Awards	50	57
Mnet 20's Choice Awards	0	1
Baeksang Arts Awards	1	6
Yahoo Asia Buzz Awards	1	1
NATE	2	2
Youku Night Awards	1	1
StarHub Night Of Stars	1	1
Brand Customer Loyalty Awards	0	1

Totals (Note: Certain award groups do not simply award one winner. They acknowledge several different recipients, have runners-up, and have third place. Since this is a specific recognition and is different from losing an award, runner-up mentions are considered wins in this award tally. For simplification and to avoid errors, each award in this list has been presumed to have had a prior nomination.)
- Wins: 67
- Nominations: 91

This is a list of awards and nominations received by South Korean variety show Running Man.

As of 2023, Running Man has been nominated for 91 awards, winning 60.

== SBS Entertainment Awards ==
Year	Award	Category	Nominee(s) / work	Result	Ref.
2010	4th SBS Entertainment Awards	Variety New Star Award	Song Joong-ki	Won	
2010	4th SBS Entertainment Awards	Variety New Star Award	Gary	Won	
2010	4th SBS Entertainment Awards	Variety New Star Award	Lee Kwang-soo	Won	
2010	4th SBS Entertainment Awards	Variety Special Award	Song Ji-hyo	Won	
2010	4th SBS Entertainment Awards	Best TV Star Award	Kim Jong-kook	Won	
2010	4th SBS Entertainment Awards	Netizen Most Popular Program Award	Running Man	Won	
2011	5th SBS Entertainment Awards	Newbie Award: Variety Category	Lee Kwang-soo	Won	
2011	5th SBS Entertainment Awards	Broadcast Writer Award	Park Hyun-sook	Won	
2011	5th SBS Entertainment Awards	Best Entertainer Award: Variety Category	Haha	Won	
2011	5th SBS Entertainment Awards	Most Outstanding Program Award	Running Man	Won	
2011	5th SBS Entertainment Awards	Outstanding Award: Variety Category	Kim Jong-kook	Won	
2011	5th SBS Entertainment Awards	Outstanding Award: Variety Category	Song Ji-hyo	Won	
2011	5th SBS Entertainment Awards	Netizen's Most Popular Award	Song Ji-hyo	Nominated	
2011	5th SBS Entertainment Awards	Netizen's Most Popular Award	Yoo Jae-suk	Nominated	
2011	5th SBS Entertainment Awards	Grand Award (Daesang)	Yoo Jae-suk	Won	
2012	6th SBS Entertainment Awards	Outstanding Award: Variety Category	Gary	Won	
2012	6th SBS Entertainment Awards	Outstanding Award: Variety Category	Ji Suk-jin	Won	
2012	6th SBS Entertainment Awards	Viewer's Most Popular Program Award	Running Man	Won	
2012	6th SBS Entertainment Awards	Viewer's Most Popular Award	Yoo Jae-suk	Won	
2012	6th SBS Entertainment Awards	Grand Award (Daesang)	Yoo Jae-suk	Won	
2013	7th SBS Entertainment Awards	Friendship Award	Lee Kwang-soo	Won	
2013	7th SBS Entertainment Awards	Best Couple Award	Ji Suk-jin & Lee Kwang-soo	Nominated	
2013	7th SBS Entertainment Awards	Best Couple Award	Gary & Song Ji-hyo	Nominated	
2013	7th SBS Entertainment Awards	Viewer's Most Popular Award	Running Man members	Won	
2013	7th SBS Entertainment Awards	Most Outstanding Program Award	Running Man	Won	
2013	7th SBS Entertainment Awards	Male Outstanding Award	Haha	Won	
2013	7th SBS Entertainment Awards	Male Outstanding Award	Kim Jong-kook	Won	
2013	7th SBS Entertainment Awards	Female Most Outstanding Award	Song Ji-hyo	Won	
2013	7th SBS Entertainment Awards	Grand Award (Daesang)	Yoo Jae-suk	Nominated	
2014	8th SBS Entertainment Awards	Viewer's Choice Most Popular Entertainer Award	Yoo Jae-suk	Won	
2014	8th SBS Entertainment Awards	Outstanding Award: Variety Shows	Lee Kwang-soo	Won	
2014	8th SBS Entertainment Awards	Most Outstanding Award: Variety Shows	Kim Jong-kook	Won	
2014	8th SBS Entertainment Awards	Viewer's Choice: Best Variety Show	Running Man	Won	
2014	8th SBS Entertainment Awards	Grand Award (Daesang)	Yoo Jae-suk	Nominated	
2015	9th SBS Entertainment Awards	Best Couple Award	Gary & Song Ji-hyo	Nominated	
2015	9th SBS Entertainment Awards	Viewer's Choice: Best Variety Show	Running Man	Won	
2015	9th SBS Entertainment Awards	Excellence Award – Variety Show	Ji Suk-jin	Won	
2015	9th SBS Entertainment Awards	Top Excellence Award – Variety Show	Gary	Won	
2015	9th SBS Entertainment Awards	Top Excellence Award – Variety Show	Song Ji-hyo	Won	
2015	9th SBS Entertainment Awards	Viewer's Choice Most Popular Entertainer Award	Yoo Jae-suk	Won	
2015	9th SBS Entertainment Awards	Grand Award (Daesang)	Yoo Jae-suk	Won	
2016	10th SBS Entertainment Awards	Top Excellence Award – Variety Show	Lee Kwang-soo	Won	
2016	10th SBS Entertainment Awards	Top Excellence Award – Variety Show	Haha	Nominated	
2016	10th SBS Entertainment Awards	Grand Award (Daesang)	Yoo Jae-suk	Nominated	
2017	11th SBS Entertainment Awards	Top Excellence Award in Variety Category	Ji Suk-jin	Won	
2017	11th SBS Entertainment Awards	Excellence Award in Variety Category	Ji Suk-jin	Nominated	
2017	11th SBS Entertainment Awards	Excellence Award in Variety Category	Haha	Nominated	
2017	11th SBS Entertainment Awards	Rookie Award in Variety Category	Jeon So-min	Won	
2017	11th SBS Entertainment Awards	Global Star Award	Running Man members	Won	
2017	11th SBS Entertainment Awards	Best Couple Award	Lee Kwang-soo & Jeon So-min	Won	
2018	12th SBS Entertainment Awards	Producer's Award	Kim Jong-kook	Won	
2018	12th SBS Entertainment Awards	Top Excellence Award (Variety)	Jeon So-min	Won	
2018	12th SBS Entertainment Awards	Best Couple Award	Kim Jong-kook & Hong Jin-young	Won	
2018	12th SBS Entertainment Awards	Best Couple Award	Lee Kwang-soo & Jeon So-min	Nominated	
2018	12th SBS Entertainment Awards	Best Teamwork Award	Running Man	Won	
2018	12th SBS Entertainment Awards	Popularity Award	Lee Kwang-soo	Won	
2018	12th SBS Entertainment Awards	Rookie Award in Female Category	Jennie	Nominated	
2018	12th SBS Entertainment Awards	Best Entertainer Award	Hong Jin-young	Nominated	
2018	12th SBS Entertainment Awards	Best Challenge Award	Kang Han-na	Nominated	
2018	12th SBS Entertainment Awards	Best Challenge Award	Lee Da-hee	Nominated	
2019	13th SBS Entertainment Awards	Best Entertainer Award	Haha	Won	
2019	13th SBS Entertainment Awards	Global Programme Award	Running Man	Won	
2019	13th SBS Entertainment Awards	SNS Star Award	Lee Kwang-soo	Won	
2019	13th SBS Entertainment Awards	Top Excellence Award in Reality Category	Kim Jong-kook	Won	
2019	13th SBS Entertainment Awards	Excellence Award in Show/Variety Category	Yang Se-chan	Won	
2019	13th SBS Entertainment Awards	Grand Prize (Daesang)	Yoo Jae-suk	Won	
2019	13th SBS Entertainment Awards	Grand Prize (Daesang)	Kim Jong-kook	Nominated	
2020	14th SBS Entertainment Awards	Golden Content Award	Running Man members	Won	
2020	14th SBS Entertainment Awards	Top Excellence Award in Show/Variety Category	Haha	Won	
2020	14th SBS Entertainment Awards	Grand Prize (Daesang)	Kim Jong-kook	Won	
2020	14th SBS Entertainment Awards	Grand Prize (Daesang)	Yoo Jae-suk	Nominated	
2021	15th SBS Entertainment Awards	Best Couple Award	Kim Jong-kook & Song Ji-hyo	Nominated	
2021	15th SBS Entertainment Awards	Entertainer of the Year Award	Yoo Jae-suk	Won	
2021	15th SBS Entertainment Awards	Entertainer of the Year Award	Kim Jong-kook	Won	
2021	15th SBS Entertainment Awards	Entertainer of the Year Award	Jee Seok-jin	Won	
2021	15th SBS Entertainment Awards	Scriptwriter Award	Yang Hyo-im	Won	
2021	15th SBS Entertainment Awards	Top Excellence Award in Variety Program Category	Running Man	Won	
2021	15th SBS Entertainment Awards	Top Excellence Award in Variety Category	Yang Se-chan	Won	
2021	15th SBS Entertainment Awards	Honorary Employee Award	Jee Seok-jin	Won	
2022	16th SBS Entertainment Awards	Best Couple Award	Yoo Jae Suk & Kim Jong-kook	Won	
2022	16th SBS Entertainment Awards	Program of the Year Award in Variety Program Category	Running Man	Won	
2022	16th SBS Entertainment Awards	Grand Prize (Daesang)	Yoo Jae-suk	Won	
2023	17th SBS Entertainment Awards	The Most Short Clip View Award	Kim Jong-kook	Won	
2023	17th SBS Entertainment Awards	Scene Stealer Award	Yang Se-chan	Won	
2023	17th SBS Entertainment Awards	Scene Stealer Award	Jee Seok-jin	Nominated	
2023	17th SBS Entertainment Awards	Scene Stealer Award	Kim Jong-kook	Nominated	
2023	17th SBS Entertainment Awards	Program of the Year Award	RunningMan	Won	
2023	17th SBS Entertainment Awards	Producer Award	Jee Seok-jin	Won	
2023	17th SBS Entertainment Awards	Grand Prize (Daesang)	Yoo Jae-suk	Nominated	
2023	17th SBS Entertainment Awards	Grand Prize (Daesang)	Kim Jong-kook	Nominated	
2024	18th SBS Entertainment Awards	Best Couple Award	Kang Hoon & Ji Ye-eun	Nominated	
2024	18th SBS Entertainment Awards	The Most Short Clip Views Award	Kim Jong-kook	Won	
2024	18th SBS Entertainment Awards	Rising Star Award	Ji Ye-eun	Won	
2024	18th SBS Entertainment Awards	Rising Star Award	Kang Hoon	Won	
2024	18th SBS Entertainment Awards	Scene Stealer Award	Song Ji-hyo	Won	
2024	18th SBS Entertainment Awards	Program of the Year Award (Most Popular Program)	Running Man	Won	
2024	18th SBS Entertainment Awards	Grand Prize (Daesang)	Yoo Jae-suk	Won	

== Other awards ==
Year	Award	Category	Nominee(s) / work	Result
2011	5th Mnet 20's Choice Awards	Hot Variety Star	Song Ji-hyo	Nominated
2012	48th Baeksang Arts Awards	Best Female Entertainer	Song Ji-hyo	Nominated
2013	49th Baeksang Arts Awards	Best Female Entertainer	Song Ji-hyo	Nominated
2013	49th Baeksang Arts Awards	Best Male Entertainer	Yoo Jae-suk	Nominated
2013	49th Baeksang Arts Awards	Grand Award (Daesang)	Yoo Jae-suk	Won
2013	49th Baeksang Arts Awards	Best Variety Show	Running Man	Nominated
2013	Yahoo! Asia Buzz Awards	Asia's Most Charismatic Korean Host	Kim Jong-kook	Won
2013	NATE Awards	Best Variety Show	Running Man	Won
2013	NATE Awards	Best Couple	Gary & Song Ji-hyo	Won
2015	Youku Night Awards	Entertainment Spirit Award	Running Man	Won
2015	51st Baeksang Arts Awards	Best Entertainment Program	Running Man	Nominated
2019	StarHub Night of Stars	Favorite Variety Show	Running Man	Won
2021	Brand Customer Loyalty Awards	Most Influential Weekend Program	Running Man	Nominated
2021	Dong-A.com's Pick	Baekse Entertainment Award	Running Man	Won
2022	Brand of the Year Awards	Program of the Year (Weekend Entertainment)	Running Man	Nominated
