= Hyun-tae =

- Hangul: 현태
- RR: Hyeontae
- MR: Hyŏnt'ae

Hyun-tae, also spelled Hyeon-tae, is a Korean given name.

People with this name include:

- Kim Hyun-tae (born 1961), South Korean football coach
- Choi Hyun-tae (born 1987), South Korean football player
- Kim Hyeon-tae (born 1990), South Korean alpine ski racer

Fictional characters with this name include:

- Kim Hyun-tae, in 2000 South Korean film Libera Me
- Shin Hyun-tae, in 2005 South Korean television series Green Rose
- Kim Hyeon-tae, in 2008 South Korean film Eye for an Eye
- Kang Hyun-tae, in 2009 South Korean television series Triple
- Park Hyun-tae, in 2013 South Korean television series Pots of Gold
- Hyun-tae, in 2014 South Korean film Confession
- Kim Hyun-tae, in 2015 South Korean television series Spy
- Kim Hyeon-tae, in 2016 South Korean television series Marrying My Daughter Twice

== See also ==
- List of Korean given names
