= Sandara Park =

South Korean singer and rapper (born 1984)

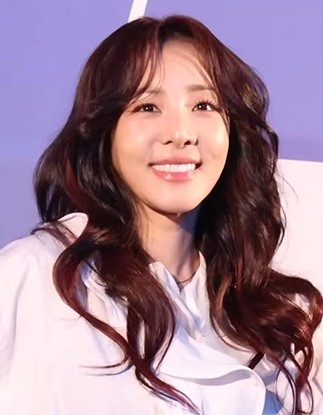
- Park in 2025
- Born: November 12, 1984 (age 42); Busan, South Korea
- Other name: Dara
- Occupations: Singer; rapper; actress; television host
- Agent: Star Magic (2004–2007)
- Relatives: Thunder (brother)
- Musical career
- Genres: K-pop; R&B; hip hop
- Instrument: Vocals
- Years active: 2004–present
- Labels: Star; YG; Abyss Company
- Member of: 2NE1

Korean name
- Hangul: 박산다라
- RR: Bak Sandara
- MR: Pak Sandara

Sandara Park (Korean: 박산다라; born November 12, 1984), also known mononymously as Dara (다라), is a South Korean singer, actress and television presenter. She rose to fame in the Philippines as a contestant on the ABS-CBN original talent show Star Circle Quest in 2004, after which she had a successful acting and singing career before returning to South Korea in 2007. She made her Korean debut in 2009 as a member of the K-pop group 2NE1, which became one of the most popular K-pop groups in the world. Park is one of the most recognizable Korean celebrities in the Philippines and is considered a leading figure in the spread of Korean Wave into the country.

In 2004, Park released her first extended play (EP), Sandara, which sold over 100,000 physical copies, making it the only album by a South Korean artist to be certified platinum by the Philippine Association of the Record Industry (PARI). She acted in several Philippine films between 2004 and 2007, including Bcuz of U (2004), for which she won the award for Best New Actress at the 21st PMPC Star Awards for Movies. In 2009, Park released her first Korean single, "Kiss", featuring fellow 2NE1 member CL.

2NE1's hiatus in 2015 allowed Park to focus on her television career, including co-hosting the South Korean variety show Two Yoo Project Sugar Man, and appearing as a judge on the Philippine talent show Pinoy Boyband Superstar. She also acted in several web series, including Dr. Ian (2016), for which she won Best Actress at a Korean web festival. Following 2NE1's disbandment at the end of 2016, Park renewed her contract with YG Entertainment until her contract expiration in May 2021.

In September 2021, Abyss Company announced that Park would be joining the agency. In July 2023, she released her first album in South Korea with the digital EP Sandara Park. After 2NE1 reformed in July 2024, Park resumed group activities under YG Entertainment.

== Early life ==
Sandara Park was born on November 12, 1984, in Busanjin District, Busan, South Korea. Her unusual three-syllable given name means "wise and clever" and is based on the childhood nickname of 7th century general Kim Yu-sin. She has two siblings: Thunder, who is a former member of K-pop boy group MBLAQ, and a younger sister named Durami. Aside from her native Korean, she is also fluent in Tagalog and English.

Park's family moved to Daegu in 1993. However, Park's father was unable to make ends meet, and the family moved to the Philippines in hopes of rebuilding his career in 1994. According to Park, she was initially lonely in the Philippines because she was not fluent in Filipino, the national language, and her pronunciation of the language was not good. She later said she worked hard to correct her pronunciation in hopes of one day becoming a celebrity, which was a dream she had harbored since hearing K-pop boy band Seo Taiji and Boys in 1992.

== Career ==
=== 2004–2013: Star Circle Quest, Philippine success and 2NE1 ===
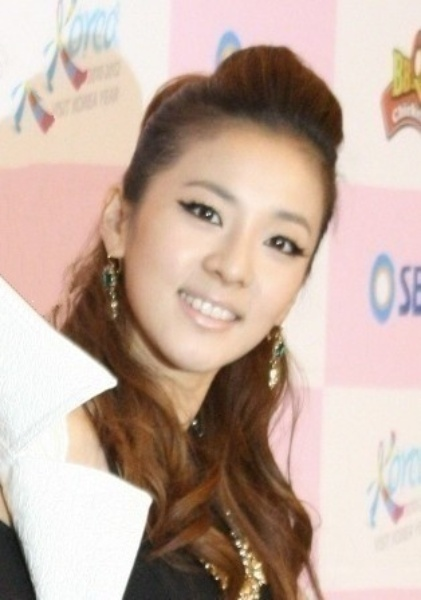
Park in 2009

In late 2003, Park met Filipina actress Pauleen Luna, who encouraged Park to audition for Star Circle Quest, a talent search television program on ABS-CBN. Over the course of the season, Park escaped elimination several times, and reached the final ten contestants. During the last elimination round, Park received approximately half a million text votes and finished in second place, behind Hero Angeles.

After the show, Park signed a contract with ABS-CBN's talent agency, Star Magic. In 2004, she starred in her first film, the romantic comedy Bcuz of U, opposite Hero Angeles. For her performance, Park won Best New Actress at the 21st PMPC Star Award for Movies. Park and Hero Angeles collaborated again for the 2005 movie Can This Be Love, which reportedly grossed almost 100 million pesos. Her third movie was 2006's D' Lucky Ones, in which she was paired with Star Circle Quest alumnus, Joseph Bitangcol. In the same year, her fourth, Super Noypi, was shown in December and was an official entry in the 32nd Metro Manila Film Festival.

Park also embarked on a music career in the Philippines that led to the release of her self-titled six-track album, Sandara, which included the novelty dance hit "In or Out", a song that parodied her experiences on Star Circle Quest. The album ultimately sold over 100,000 physical copies, making it the only album by a South Korean artist to be certified platinum by the Philippine Association of the Record Industry. Park left the Filipino show business and returned to South Korea with her family in 2007, as she was not offered to renew her contract with Star Magic. Shortly after, she signed a contract with YG Entertainment, whose CEO Yang Hyun-suk had scouted her back in 2004 after she appeared on a KBS documentary.

Park took on the stage name Dara, and together with Bom, CL, and Minzy, debuted as K-pop girl group 2NE1 in 2009. The group collaborated with label-mates Big Bang for the promotional single "Lollipop", before officially debuting with their first single "Fire". That same year, the group released their first EP, 2NE1, and achieved significant success with the hit single "I Don't Care", which won the Song of the Year award at the 2009 Mnet Asian Music Awards.

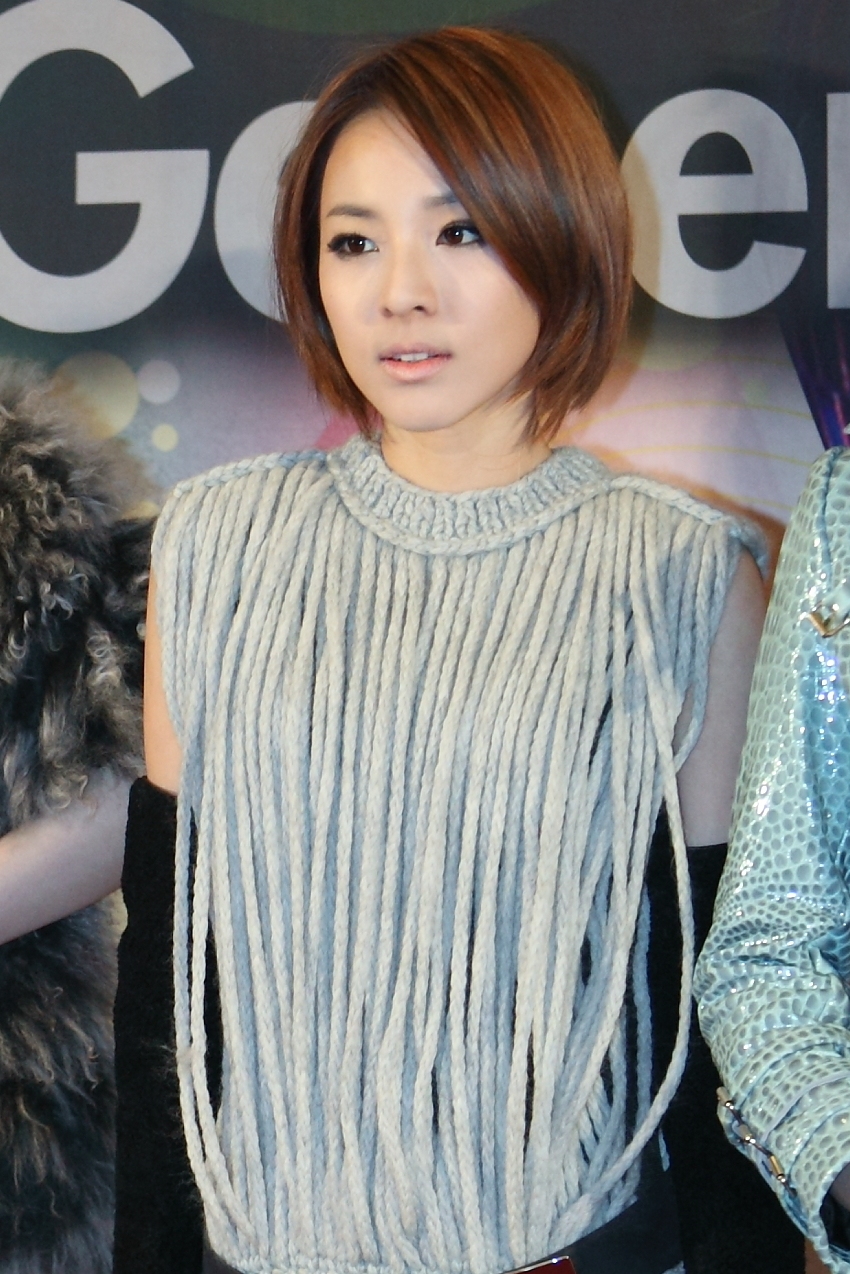
Park at the 2010 Melon Music Awards

Park also made her solo Korean debut in 2009. She was featured on the single "Hello" from BigBang member G-Dragon's album Heartbreaker, and later released her first solo single, "Kiss", which featured fellow 2NE1 member CL as a rapper. The song was used in a video promoting Cass Beer, which Park starred in alongside actor Lee Min-ho. The video became popular for a kissing scene between the two performers, and the single topped South Korean music charts. Park again teamed up with a BigBang member in 2010, when she made an appearance as the female lead in Taeyang's "I Need A Girl" music video.

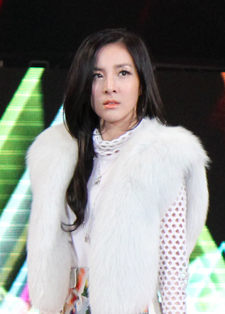
Park performing with 2NE1 in California in November 2012

During this era, 2NE1 continued to release hit albums and songs, including "I Am the Best" (2011), "I Love You" (2012) and "Falling in Love" (2013), which topped the charts in South Korea and made the group the second South Korean artists after Psy to top the US Billboard World Digital Songs chart. As a result of 2NE1's growing fame, Park's earlier Philippine movies Bcuz of U, Can This Be Love, and D' Lucky Ones were screened in South Korea in 2012.

=== 2014–2015: Return to the Philippines, renewed acting and Sugar Man ===
In May 2014, ABS-CBN announced that Park would be a guest on Pinoy Big Brother, which set off a social media frenzy, dominating both the Philippines and worldwide Twitter trending topics. She guest-starred on the show on May 15, and later appeared as a celebrity house-guest in the telecast, All In Über, during its live episode.

Back in South Korea, Park replaced close friend Yoo In-na as a DJ for her Let's Crank Up the Volume radio program from May to June due to scheduling clashes. Later in the year, Park made a surprise cameo appearance as a top actress in the last episode of the highly rated Korean drama My Love from the Star. On November 12, 2014, BeFunny Studios made an unannounced release of a three-part mini web series starring The Walking Dead's Steven Yeun and Park, titled What's eating Steven Yeun. Park played the role of Steven Yeun's American girlfriend who is left behind as her boyfriend pursues a career in "Mukbang", a popular Korean internet broadcast where generally attractive people paid to eat in front of a webcam. The comedy sketch went viral, and reached over a million views in the few days after release.

In 2015, seven years after her last acting role, Park returned to the small screen through the web-drama Dr. Ian, starring alongside Kim Young-kwang. Expectations were high as the series featured Park in her first leading role since returning to South Korea, coupled with the involvement of director Kwon Hyeok-chan (Secret Garden, Master's Sun). The series enjoyed global popularity, not only in Korea but also in the United States, Taiwan, and Thailand, surpassing 500,000 views within three days of its broadcasting. Park became the first actress to win the "Best Actress" award at the K-web festival for her performance.

The same month, Park featured in label-mate Jinusean's stage for their single "Tell Me", on You Hee-yeol's Sketchbook. Her natural performance impressed the group which led to a second collaboration, where Park featured on their "Tell Me One More Time" comeback stage in place of the original singer, Jang Hana, on KBS2's Music Bank on May 1. Park then took on her second leading role in We Broke Up, a web-drama based upon a web-toon of the same name. She played the role of Noh Woo-ri, an optimistic and bright girl preparing to get a job. Premiering in June, the series was a success, becoming the fourth most watched web-drama on Naver with 16 million views. Due to the positive reception, the cast held a personal 'mini concert' on August 17. Park also made cameo appearances in the television series The Producers, playing a fictional 2 Days & 1 Night variety program cast member alongside her We Broke Up co-star Kang Seung-yoon.

On September 15, 2015, Park was cast opposite Goong star Kim Jeong-hoon in Missing Korea, a romantic-comedy set in the fictional year of 2020, in which the North and South are working towards unification through non-governmental exchanges and economic cooperation, leading to the first-ever 'North-South Joint Miss Korea Pageant'. Though not as successful on the global market as her previous web-dramas, Park received acting recognition and earned her another nomination for "Best Actress" in the 2016 K-web festival, making her the first idol-turned-actress to be nominated for the award in succeeding years.

Park later joined JTBC variety show Sugar Man from 2015 to 2016, alongside Yoo Jae-suk, You Hee-yeol, and Kim Eana as a co-host. The first episode was broadcast on October 20. The production team stated, "We think that Sandara Park has a unique strength that encompasses the emotions of the younger generation and the memories of the older generation. We predict she will actively radiate new, never-before-seen charms." Through her involvement as YG Entertainment's public relations director, artists such as Akmu, Winner, iKon, and Lee Hi were able to perform on the show, and during an episode for which she wasn't present, friend and fellow actress Yoo In-na replaced her.

=== 2016–present: 2NE1's disbandment, domestic film debut, first solo concert, and new agency ===
Park started the year 2016 with a special appearance in the MBC drama One More Happy Ending, as a beloved but spoiled star of a popular girl group. The producer of the drama expressed the difficulty of casting an actress who could play the role, as the character's beauty was meant to overshadow characters played by actresses like Yoo In-na, Jang Na-ra, Yoo Da-in, and Seo In-young. It was because of Yoo In-na that they came in contact and the matter was resolved. Park also participated in the promotional single "Loving U" as part of the drama's soundtrack. Park was officially promoted from being YG Entertainment's public relations head to director. Park then joined the judging panel of ABS-CBN's reality singing competition show Pinoy Boyband Superstar, alongside Filipino top stars Yeng Constantino, Vice Ganda, and Aga Muhlach. The show is based on the format created by Simon Cowell and was first shown in U.S. through La Banda. The show premiered on September 10, and became the most watched weekend program, and the second highest program in television viewership nationwide. As the show was still filming the day after 2NE1 announced their disbandment, Park became the first member to respond after the event by handing a handwritten letter in English to fans on November 26, 2016, and allowing them to upload the contents on her behalf. YG also revealed that Park and CL had signed solo contracts, hinting at the departure of Park Bom from the company.

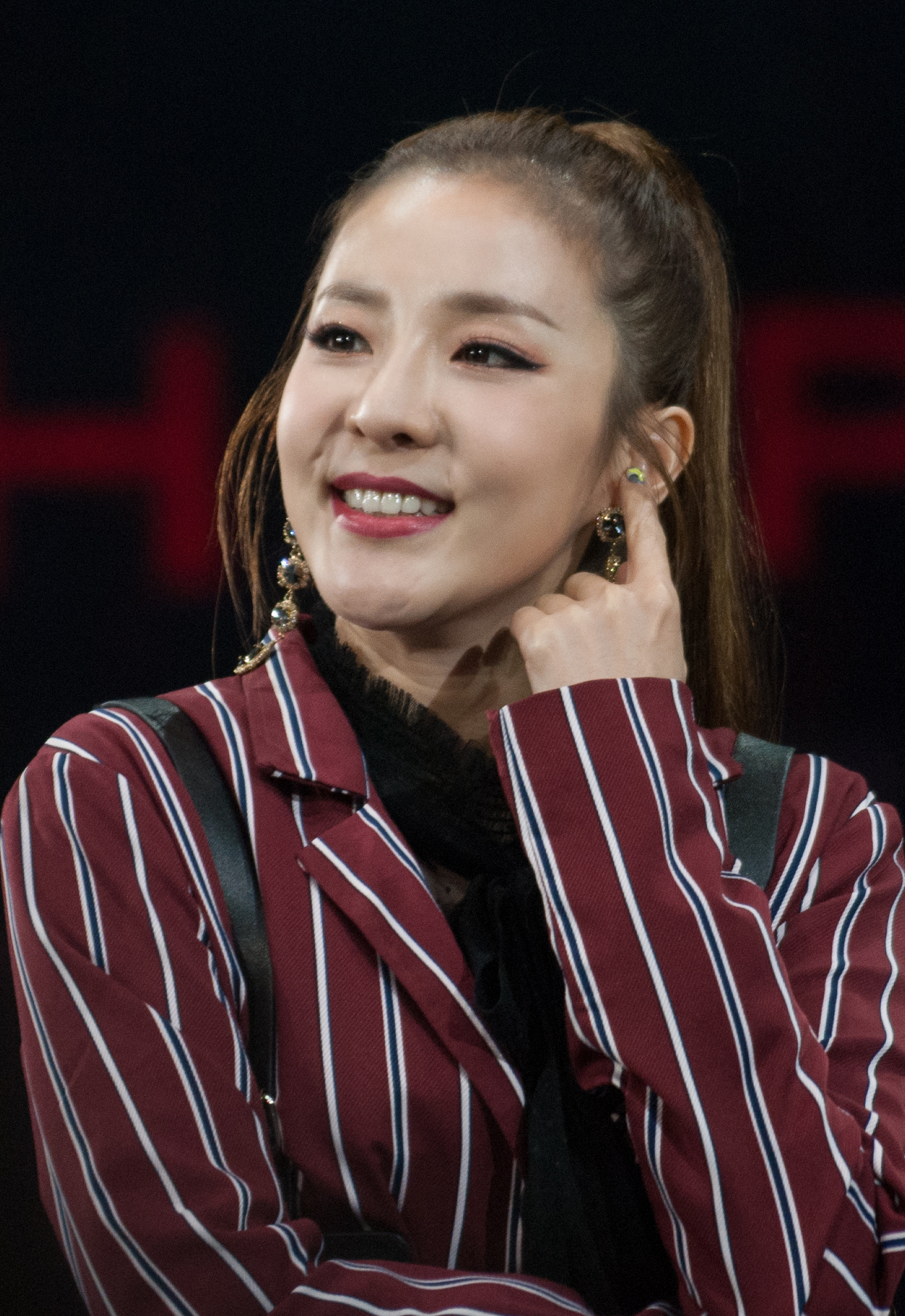
Park at the Penshoppe Fan Con in 2018

In 2017, Park became the host of OnStyle's beauty program Get It Beauty, alongside Lee Hanee, Lee Se-young and Gugudan's Kim Se-jeong. Park then starred alongside Han Jae-suk in her domestic debut film One Step. Billed as the Korean remake of Begin Again, she portrayed Si-hyun, a convenience store part-timer who seeks out a mysterious melody she hears every night in her dreams, and meets the producer of an Internet broadcasting program who tries to help her find out the music. The film premiered in South Korea on April 6, 2017, and opened on May 10, in the Philippines. She received acting praise from its director, Jeon Jae-hong, who noted that she only had one retake during the filming process due to her professionalism. Park participated in another OnStyle project titled Relationship Appeal, where she reviewed trending topics and travel to popular tourist spots. Controversy arose when rude remarks directed at Park were made during MBC's SeMoBang: All Broadcasting in the World collaboration segment with Piki Pictures mobile variety team 'This is Real'. As the concept, the main characters were to "overhear" the constructive criticism of everyday netizens (picked by the 'This is Real' team) by separating the two groups with a thin wall. Viewers who watched the program criticized the teams selection and expressed discomfort with the remarks as they were believed to be personal attacks made in a subjective way. Piki Pictures issued an apology soon after and MBC deleted the video featuring the incident. Park closed the year by performing 2NE1's past hits in a solo headlining concert, one year after the band's disbandment.

Park scored her first mainstream big screen role in the film adaption of the popular webtoon Cheese in the Trap as the heroine's best friend, Jang Bo-ra. The film premiered exclusively in CGV theatres on March 14, and placed among the top five at the weekend box office. This was followed by a leading role in an indie Vampire action film directed by Lee Won Jun, titled 107th Year of Night, which went on to win the category "Foreign Suspense Thriller Award" at the 2018 International Horror Hotel Festival for the Short Film Division at Cleveland, Ohio, U.S.. The year also continued Park's increased regular appearances on television with Mimi Shop, Borrowing Trouble, and MBC's Real Man 300.

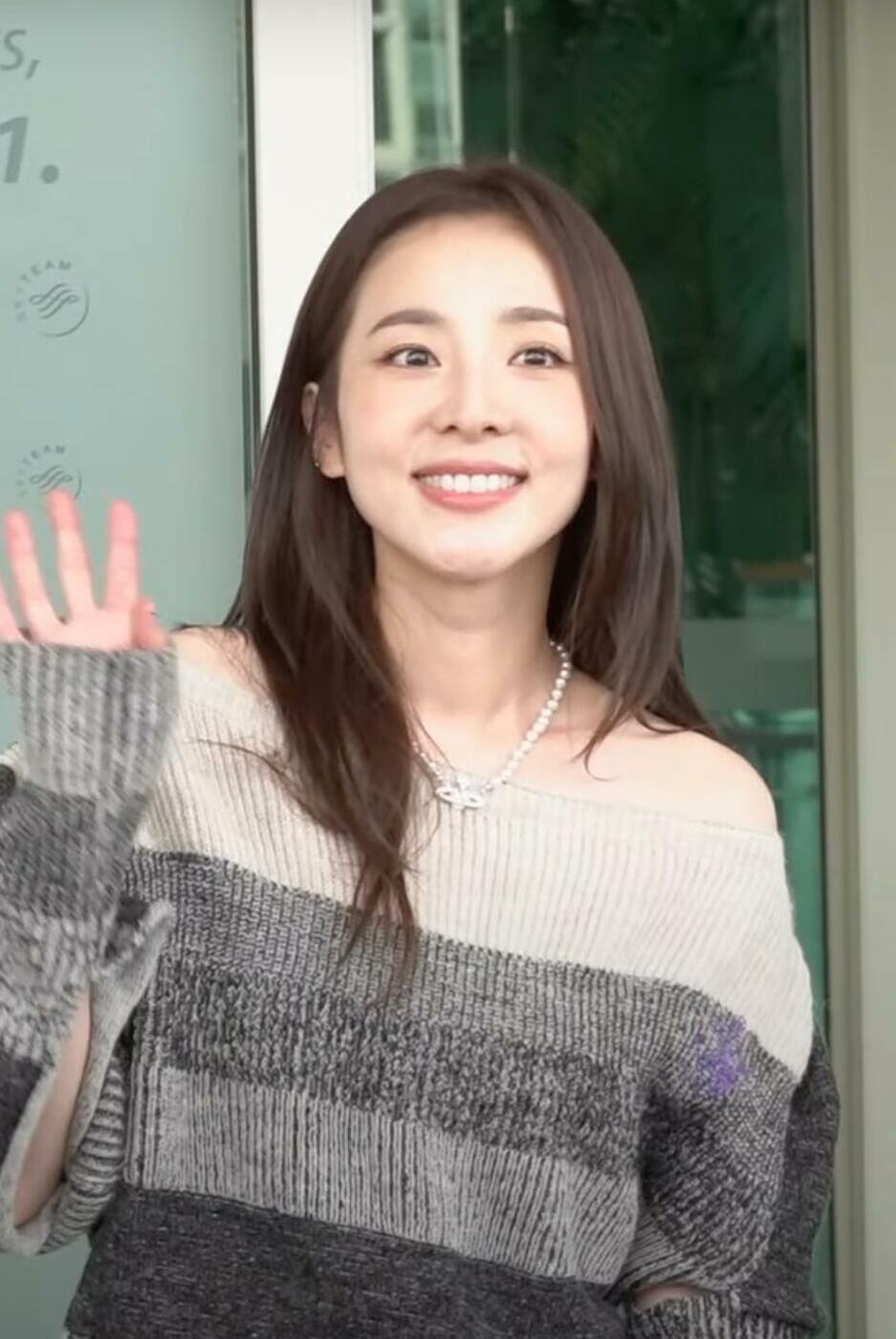
Park in 2022

In January 2019, Park served as a special guest and support act for labelmate Seungri on his Hong Kong and Manila tour dates for The Great Seungri tour. During that month, Park became a permanent co-host for the all-female talk show Video Star. Park reunited with former 2NE1 bandmate Park Bom as a featured artist for her single, "Spring", which was released on March 13. Park also became a judge and advisor in Stage K, a K-pop challenge variety television show, which premiered in April 2019. In 2020, Park made her musical debut through the stage adaptation of the (tvN) drama Another Oh Hae-young and had a cameo in the melodrama Shall We Have Dinner Together as a patient seeking physiological help to remedy her eating habits. She also became a host for a Korean program Idol League with BTOB's leader Eunkwang.

In March 2021, the cast of an interactive sitcom called On Air – The Secret Contract were revealed, including Park as the female lead named Shin Woo-ri, a writer that knows the secret of DJ Aaron, an arrogant top idol portrayed by actor Hong Joo-chan. On May 14, 2021, it was announced that Park left YG Entertainment as her exclusive contract has expired. On September 1, 2021, Abyss Company announced that Park had signed an exclusive contract with the agency. On June 23, 2023, Park announced that her self-titled Korean-language extended play (EP) Sandara Park would be released the following month on July 12. In 2024, Park embarked on a reunion tour with 2NE1, titled the Welcome Back Tour, which grossed $44 million in revenue.

== Public image ==
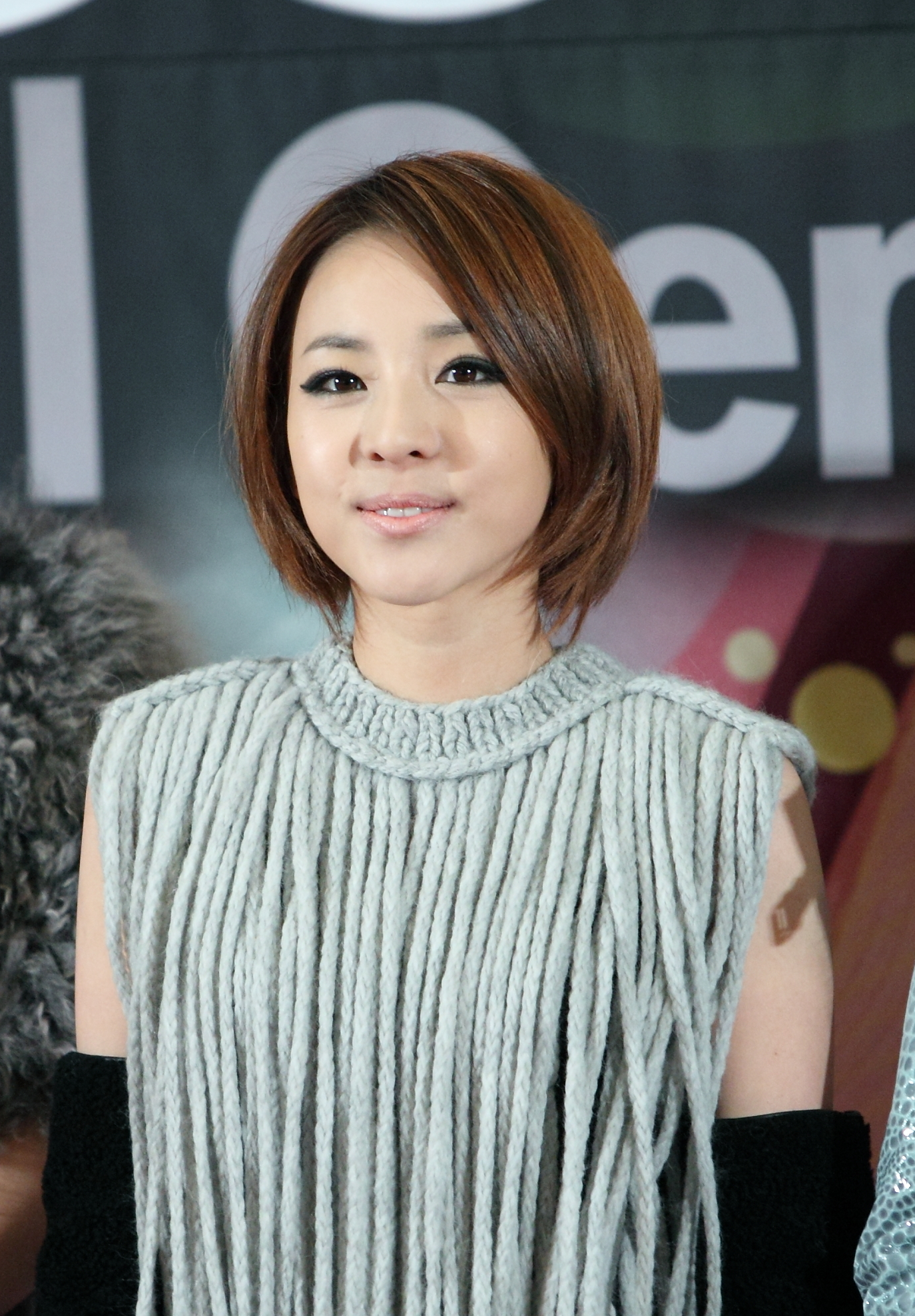
Park's appearance has been highlighted by plastic surgery clinics in Korea.

Park's style has impacted the Korean industry, ranging from her signature tail lilt eye make-up, to her bold hair styles and clothing. Her first appearance in Lollipop sporting her 'palm-tree' hairstyle became widely parodied style in 2009 and remains a notable piece in K-pop. Her 2012 look, for which she had shaved a portion of her trademark locks for the promotional single "I Love You", attracted massive media attention and initially garnered mixed reactions, notable for its shock factor and contradictory styling to the typical girl-group 'look'. The style is considered to be her most noteworthy transformation.

In popular culture, Park is the icon of "baby-face" amongst celebrities and the public, which is an individual who looks younger than their actual age. Despite being born in the early 1980s, Park is known to top and beat other competitors in surveys, often with a large gap between their ages, thus earning herself the nickname "vampire" for her youthful skin and look. Attesting to the quality of her skin, she was described to be a popular choice for both advertisers and consumers, who would be drawn to her clear and seemingly poreless face. In 2012, she was announced to be one of the most beautiful women of her time.

== Impact and influence ==
Park is credited as one of the leading figures in the spread of the Korean Wave in the Philippines. SunStar wrote that Park's success in the country "sparked a huge interest in Korean music among Filipinos, leading to the spread of Korean culture and a connection with the people of the Philippines." She has been likened to South Korean singer BoA due to her similar success, as BoA was the first Korean artist to break through the Japanese market. Her popularity in the region is likened to comedian Yoo Jae-suk's fame in South Korea. In 2025, Park was ranked as the number one K-pop artist with the most positive impact on Korea's image in the country.

In 2010, Park was voted the most beautiful girl group member in Korea by the public in a poll conducted by TvN. She topped a survey of girl group idols with the best skin by Star M Plastic Surgery & Dermatology Clinic, and was ranked second among celebrities with the most sought-after faces according to plastic surgeons in Gangnam. That same year, Park ranked number one on a Arirang TV survey of celebrities with the best appearance, and in 2014, was named again the most beautiful girl group member in Korea. She ranked number one in a survey conducted by a Lamar Clinic of celebrities who appear as if they never age, with the clinic's director highlighting her clear, elastic skin and 1:1:0.8 facial proportions, dubbed as the "golden ratio of youthfulness".

== Other ventures ==
=== Endorsements and promotions ===
Park is one of the most in-demand faces in both the Philippines and South Korea, having appeared in many TV commercials and print ads over the course of her career. Park's huge popularity led to her instantly signing many Philippine and foreign endorsement deals ranging from personal care and food products to everyday items at the end of the competition. Her first endorsement was for Dong-A pens. Along with other Star Circle Quest finalists, Park modeled for and endorsed BNY Jeans in 2004. She served as the face for Tekki Asian Classic Noodles, and helped promote Canon, a Japanese camera brand looking to solidify their power in the Philippines. She endorsed Confident feminine napkins, and Rejoice shampoo as well. In addition to the shampoo's advertisements, Park also contributed a single to go along with the brand. Park also campaigned for Maxi-Peel with Kristine Hermosa. Following the revival of her career as a member of 2NE1, Sandara endorsed high-profile local brands without the group. In 2009, she became the endorsement model for Oriental Brewery's Cass beer series, one of Korea's most famous alcoholic beverages, alongside actor Lee Min-ho. To help promote the beer, an accompanying music video and song was released to nationwide attention.

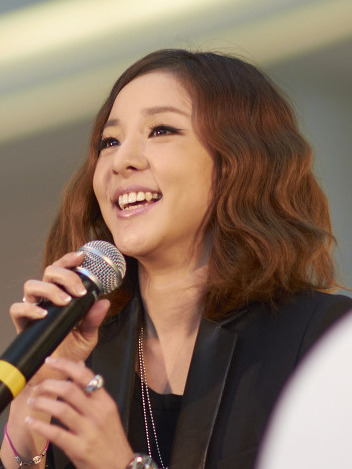
Park at a Nikon event in 2011

While promoting alongside 2NE1 for an endorsement deal with Mitsubishi's subsidiary Nikon Corporation, Park was solely chosen to become their main model for their new Nikon Coolpix p300 camera. Dongkook Kim, brand manager of Nikon Korea, stated that signing her would increase their products "attractiveness", and motivate buyers to purchase their items. After her campaign debuted, the company reported a massive increase in sales that put them only behind Samsung, the largest business conglomerate in South Korea, for the year of 2012. The company named the camera after her, going by the official name of "Sandara Digicam". Park is also well known for endorsing makeup brands. Despite having already worked with Etude House in 2010 alongside her group, the makeup brand sought to continue with her for an additional two years with the belief that her image would be a "good influence" to potential buyers. Over the course of her endorsement with Etude, the brand was able to compete with popular local makeup companies and were launched to international success. An umbrella called 'Sweet Bunny' was made available online and in stores to be given to buyers who paid for a certain number of items. The limited special not only increased Etude House's sales, but also attracted a foreign consumer base who, moments after Park was seen holding the item, visited the South Korean stores specifically to purchase the umbrella, where it was bought in every color. In a week, Etude House sold over 40,000 of the umbrellas, ultimately selling out the product. A representative described the reactions of the public as "surprising". The makeup brand won several web awards for their achievements in marketing, services and makeup as well.

In 2013, Sandara became the new makeup model for Clio, a well-established makeup company founded in 1993. Immediately after, sites recorded increased sales and her 'bloody series' makeup became a top-seller. The following year, the company's mascara, Salon de Cara, was launched with Park as its model and sold out 130,000 units of its initial stock nationwide in three weeks. The mascara went on to sell a record-breaking 300,000 units in the months following. A fan-signing event was held on November 14 as a thank-you to the buyers. Clio then closed the year with four awards, three of which were modeled by Park.

In 2015, Park joined the likes of supermodels Cara Delevingne, Sean O'Pry, and fashion model/TV personality Kendall Jenner as Penshoppe's ambassador. The following year, Park and G-Dragon were chosen as exclusive models for the cosmetic brand Moonshot, launched previously by YG Plus in 2014, a subsidiary company of YG Entertainment. Days after launching products released in their namesake, the product was sold out and required immediate restocking. A representative of Moonshot noted that it was the first time their products left stores at such a high rate and that the overall reservations had gone up substantially. In June 2016, Park became the new endorser for American shampoo brand Head & Shoulders. She became a Korea-Philippines Friendship Ambassador in 2017, and a Community Chest of Korea Public Relations Ambassador in 2023.

Aside from her solo endorsements, Park has endorsed Adidas, 11st, Intel, Baskin Robbins, Italian sports brand Fila, Samsung, Yamaha, Bean Pole, and Nintendo Wii with her group.

=== Philanthropy ===
Park regularly volunteers for label-mate Sean's annual briquette charity event every New Year's Eve. In November 2013, Dara and her brother lent their support for the campaign effort "WEGENERATION" to help the devastated survivors of Super Typhoon Yolanda. Having long considered the Philippines their second home after spending their childhood there, the Park siblings responded to the desperate situation by collaborating with both "WEGENERATION" and charity organization "World Share" to launch an online emergency aid fundraising system. By January, they raised 3 million won (₱116,721) for survivors.

In 2016, she provided her services to Purme Foundation Children's Rehabilitation Hospital, donating gifts given to her by fans over the years to the children. In October 2020, Park donated 30,000 face masks to Korea Children's Incurable Disease Association, WE START, and the Korea Pediatric Cancer Foundation. The masks were given to children with cancer to protect themselves from COVID-19.

== Personal life ==
During a promotional visit with 2NE1, Park was caught in the Tohoku earthquake and tsunami that devastated Japan in 2011. Feeling unwell, Park had remained on the 34th floor of the hotel she and her members were staying in when the earthquake hit. She managed to contact CL using the hotel phone, prompting CL to walk up several flights of stairs to rescue her. Assisted by a staff member, they walked down 34 flights and were relocated to a safer location. They were included in Fuse's list of "18 Female Friendships In Music" because of the story. On June 4, 2018, she was the host for the Philippines-South Korea state dinner at the Blue House. She was recognized as the country's "Friendship Ambassador" to South Korea.

== Discography ==
=== Extended plays ===
Title	Details	Sales	Certifications
Sandara	Released: July 1, 2004 (PHL); Re-released: December 31, 2004; Re-released (Ang Ganda Ko): December 31, 2005; Formats: CD, digital download; Label: Star Music; Track listing: 1. In or Out; 2. Mapasagot Mo Kaya; 3. Smile In Your Heart; 4. Sabi Ko Na Nga Ba; 5. Dear Heart; 6. Walang Sabit (re-release bonus track); 7. Ang Ganda Ko (2nd re-release bonus track)	PHL: 100,000	PARI: 2× Platinum
Sandara Park	Released: July 12, 2023 (KOR); Label: Abyss Company; Formats: Digital download, streaming	—N/a	—N/a

=== Singles ===
==== As lead artist ====
Title	Year	Peak chart positions		Album
Title	Year	KOR	US World	Album
"In or Out"	2004	—	—	Sandara
"Walang Sabit"	2004	—	—	Sandara
"Ang Ganda Ko"	2005	—	—	Sandara
"Kiss" (featuring CL)	2009	73	—	To Anyone
"Festival"	2023	— (Note: "Festival" did not enter the Circle Digital Chart, but debuted and peaked at number 43 on the Circle Download Chart and number 72 on the BGM Chart.)	—	Sandara Park
"2 Proud" (with apl.de.ap)	2024	—	—	Non-album single
"—" denotes releases that did not chart or were not released in that region.

==== As featured artist ====
Title	Year	Peak chart positions		Album
Title	Year	KOR	US World	Album
"Hello" (G-Dragon featuring Dara)	2009	—	—	Heartbreaker
"Love Love Love" (Japanese version) (Epik High featuring Dara)	2016	—	—	The Best of Epik High: Show Must Go On & On
"Spring" (Park Bom featuring Sandara Park)	2019	3	2	Spring
"First Snow" (첫눈) (Park Bom featuring Sandara Park)	2019	168	19	Non-album single
"Reset" (Acer Philippines featuring SB19 and Sandara Park)	2023	—	—	Non-album single
"—" denotes releases that did not chart or were not released in that region.

=== Other charted songs ===
Title	Year	Peak chart positions	Album
Title	Year	KOR Down.	Album
"T Map"	2023	128	Sandara Park
"Dara Dara"	2023	146	Sandara Park
"Play!"	2023	152	Sandara Park
"Happy Ending"	2023	155	Sandara Park

=== Soundtrack appearances ===
Title	Year	Peak chart positions	Album
Title	Year	KOR	Album
"We are the Stars" (Filipino ver.) (with Hero Angeles, Roxanne Guinoo, Joross Gamboa, Melissa Ricks)	2004	—	Ragnarok the Animation OST
"Two of Us" (with Kang Seung-yoon)	2015	—	We Broke Up OST
"We Broke Up" (with Kang Seung-yoon)	2015	—	We Broke Up OST
"Always For You" (Angels feat. Dara, Jang Na-ra, Yoo Da-in, Yoo In-na, Seo In-young)	2016	—	One More Happy Ending OST
"Song of Memory" (with Han Jae-suk)	2017	—	One Step OST
"One Step"	2017	—	One Step OST
"—" denotes releases that did not chart or were not released in that region.

== Filmography ==
=== Films ===
Year	Title	Role	Notes
2004	Volta	Herself	Cameo
2004	Bcuz of U	April	
2005	Can This Be Love	Daisy	
2006	D' Lucky Ones	Lucky girl / Anna	
2006	Super Noypi	Michie Rapisora	
2009	Girlfriends	Herself	Cameo with 2NE1
2017	My Ex and Whys	Herself	Cameo
2017	One Step	Si-hyun	
2018	107th Year of Night	Jay	
2018	Cheese in the Trap	Jang Bo-ra	
2027	K-Pop: The Debut	Herself	

=== Television series ===
Year	Title	Role	Notes/Ref.
2004	Krystala	Kim	
2004	SCQ Reload: Ok Ako!	Sandara Soh	
2004	Maalaala Mo Kaya: Scrapbook	Herself	
2005	Voltes V Evolution	Megumi Oka / Jamie Robinson	Voice-dubbed
2006	Your Song: Everything You Do	Herself	
2006	Komiks Presents: Machete	Mara	
2006	Crazy for You	Ara	
2006	Abt Ur Luv	Betina	Cameo
2007	Dalawang Tisoy	Kim Chee	
2009	The Return of Iljimae	Rie	
2009	Style	Herself	Cameo with 2NE1 (episode 6)
2014	My Love from the Star	Herself / top actress	Cameo (episode 21)
2014	What's Eating Steven Yeun?	Herself	
2015	Dr. Ian	Lee So-dam	Web drama
2015	We Broke Up	Noh Woo-ri	Web drama
2015	The Producers	Herself	Cameo (episodes 4, 5, 12)
2015	Missing Korea	Ri Yeon-hwa	Web drama
2016	One More Happy Ending	Goo Seul-ah	Cameo (episode 1)
2020	Dinner Mate	Herself as patient	Cameo (episode 11)

=== Documentary ===
Year	Title	Role
2004	My Name is Sandara Park	Herself

=== Reality television ===
Year	Title	Role	Notes/Ref.
2004	Star Circle Quest	Herself (contestant)	First Runner-up
2006	Gudtaym	Main cast	
2015	Two Yoo Project Sugar Man	Host	with You Hee-yeol, Yoo Jae-suk and Kim Eana
2016	Pinoy Boyband Superstar	Judge	with Aga Muhlach, Vice Ganda and Yeng Constantino
2017	Get It Beauty	Host	with Lee Hanee, Lee Se-young and Kim Se-jeong
2017	Living Together in Empty Room	Cast member	episodes 12–20, with Jo Se-ho and P. O
2017	Relationship Appeal	Main cast	with Lee Hi and Lee Su-hyun
2017	All Broadcasting in the World	Fixed cast	with Lee Kyung-kyu, Park Myeong-su, Joo Sang-wook, Lee Soo-kyung and Henry Lau
2018	Mimi Shop	Cast member	with Tony An, Cheetah, Kim Jin-kyung and Shin So-yul
2018	Borrow Trouble	Cast member	with Eunhyuk, JR, Joon Park and DinDin
2018	Real Man 300	Cast member	"Special Warfare School" edition
2019	Video Star	Host	episodes 130–present, with Park Na-rae, Kim Sook and Park So-hyun
2019	Stage K	Judge / mentor	with Jun Hyun-moo, Joon Park, Eun Ji-won and Kim Yu-bin
2020	Idol League: Season 3 (2020)	Main host	with Seo Eun-kwang
2021	Celebeauty Season 3	MC	with Lee Si-young, DinDin, Jung Hye-sung and Hyelin
2025	Be the Next: 9 Dreamers	Main host	

=== Web shows ===
Year	Title	Role	Notes	Ref.
2021	Get It Beauty	Host	with Kim Min-ju	
2022–2023	Sisters Who Don't Taste Rice	Host	with Park So-hyun	

=== Hosting ===
Year	Title	Notes	Ref.
2021	2021 Asia Song Festival	with BamBam	

== Live performances ==
Reprism Fan Con Asia Tour
Date	City	Country	Venue
July 4, 2026	Seoul	South Korea	Yes24 Live Hall
August 15, 2026	Bangkok	Thailand	Samyan Mitrtown Hall

Fan Meetings
Name	Date	City	Country	Venue	Attendance
Singapore Playdate	July 17, 2026	Singapore		Orchard Central	1,000

== Accolades ==
=== Awards and nominations ===
Name of the award ceremony, year presented, award category, nominee(s) of the award, and the result of the nomination
Award ceremony	Year	Category	Nominee(s) / Work(s)	Result	Ref.
Asia Artist Awards	2023	Popularity Award – Singer (Female)	Sandara Park	Nominated	
Elle Style Awards	2018	Trend Entertainer Award	Sandara Park	Won	
Gaon Chart Music Awards	2020	Song of the Year – March	"Spring" (Park Bom feat. Sandara Park)	Nominated	
Golden Screen TV Awards	2005	Best Performance by an Actress in a Leading Role	Can This Be Love	Nominated	
Golden Screen TV Awards	2006	Best Actress	Sandara Park	Nominated	
Korea First Brand Awards	2021	Beauty Icon Award	Sandara Park	Won	
KWeb Festival	2015	Best Actress	Dr. Ian	Won	
KWeb Festival	2016	Best Actress	Missing Korea	Nominated	
MBC Entertainment Awards	2017	Best Artist Award	Insolent Housemates	Nominated	
MBC Entertainment Awards	2017	Best Couple Award	Insolent Housemates	Nominated	
MBC Entertainment Awards	2021	Popularity Award	King of Mask Singer and I Live Alone	Won	
Melon Music Awards	2019	Best R&B/Soul Award	"Spring" (Park Bom feat. Sandara Park)	Nominated	
Philippine K-pop Awards	2010	Hottest Female Star	Sandara Park	Won	
Philippine K-pop Awards	2012	Hottest Female Star	Sandara Park	Won	
PMPC Star Awards for Movies	2005	Best New Actress	Bcuz of U	Won	
Seoul Music Awards	2024	K-pop Special Award	Sandara Park	Won	
TVCF Advertisement Awards	2010	CF Model of the Year	Nikon	Nominated	
TVCF Advertisement Awards	2011	CF Model of the Year	Etude House	Nominated	
TVCF Advertisement Awards	2012	CF Model of the Year	Etude House	Nominated	

=== Other recognitions ===
Name of organization, year given, and name of honor
Organization	Year	Honor	Ref.
Korea Tourism Organization	2015	Plaque of Appreciation	
