= Jee Seok-jin =

South Korean entertainer (born 1966)

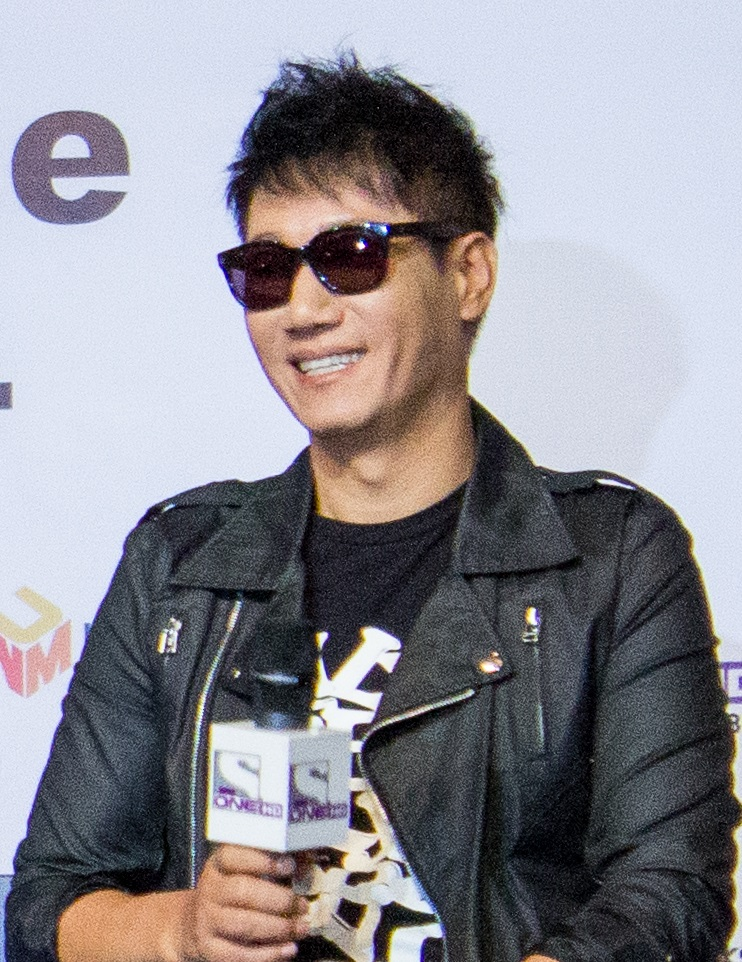
- Jee in 2014
- Born: February 10, 1966 (age 60); Jeongseon County, Gangwon Province, South Korea
- Education: Ajou University (BBA)
- Occupations: Comedian; singer; television presenter; actor; broadcaster
- Years active: 1992–present
- Agent: ESTeem Entertainment
- Spouse: Ryu Su-jung (m. 1997)
- Children: 1

Korean name
- Hangul: 지석진
- Hanja: 池錫辰
- RR: Ji Seokjin
- MR: Chi Sŏkchin

Jee Seok-jin (Korean: 지석진; born February 10, 1966) is a South Korean comedian, singer, television presenter, actor, and broadcaster. He made his entertainment industry debut in 1992 as a singer and gained worldwide popularity with the variety show Running Man (2010–present).

== Early life and education ==
He graduated from Ajou University with a bachelor's degree in Business Administration.

== Career ==
In 1992, Jee Seok-jin debuted as a singer, releasing his first album "I Know", but gained popularity as an MC and comedian in the entertainment industry. He was most commonly known as the main MC in the variety show Star Golden Bell, which aired from 2004 to 2010.

Since 2010, Jee is best known as a cast member in the variety show Running Man, of which he is one the original members alongside long-time friend Yoo Jae-suk, Kim Jong-kook, Haha, Lee Kwang-soo, Gary, and Song Joong-ki.

In addition to his television career, he also hosted the afternoon radio show 2 O'Clock Date on MBC FM4U from September 26, 2016 to September 29, 2019. In 2021, he joined musical supergroup M.O.M. under the stage name Byeollu Jee alongside KCM, Wonstein, and Parc Jae-jung. Jee founded the duo Chungju Ji-ssi with fellow Running Man member Ji Ye-eun in 2025, releasing the single "Milkshake" featuring Wonstein. The duo later performed the song at the Waterbomb festival.

In August 2022, Jee has signed a contract with Uzurocks Entertainment. In November 2023, Jee signed a contract with ESTeem Entertainment.

== Personal life ==
Jee met his wife through an introduction from Yoo Jae-suk. Jee and his wife celebrated their 20th wedding anniversary in January 2017. Their "second wedding" was aired on Running Man in a special episode called "Big Nose Week" (alluding to Jee's nickname on the show). They have a son, Jee Hyun-woo, who made a rare appearance on a Running Man episode in 2015.

== Discography ==
=== Album ===
- 1992: I Know

=== Singles ===
| Title | Year | Album |
|---|---|---|
| "Neoneun Naeunmyeong" (너는 내운명, 'You're my destiny') (Nara ft. Jee Seok-jin and Kim Yong-man) | 2009 | Color of Trot |
| "Saying I Love You" (사랑한다 말하는건) | 2014 | My Dear Cat OST |
| "Hairpin" (머리핀) (Korean version) | 2015 | Romance for 7 Days OST |
| "Hairpin" (发卡) (Chinese version) | 2015 | Romance for 7 Days OST |
| "Ni Zui Zhen Gui" (你最珍贵) | 2017 | Non-album single |
| "Party" (with Lee Kwang-soo and Apink) | 2019 | Running Man Fan Meeting: Project Running 9 |
| "I Like It" with Running Man members) | 2019 | Running Man Fan Meeting: Project Running 9 |
| "Journey To Atlantis" (상상더하기) (with MSG Wannabe members) | 2021 | MSG Wannabe Top 8 Performance Songs |
| "If" (만약에) (with KCM, Wonstein and Parc Jae-jung) | 2021 | MSG Wannabe Top 8 Performance Songs |
| "Foolish Love" (바라만 본다) (with KCM, Wonstein and Parc Jae-jung) | 2021 | MSG Wannabe 1st Album |
| "Milkshake" (밀크쉐이크) (with Ji Ye-eun ft. Wonstein) | 2025 | Non-album single |

== Filmography ==
=== Television shows ===
List of present programs
| Year | Title | Role | Note | Ref. |
|---|---|---|---|---|
| 2010–present | Running Man | Cast member | Episode 1–present | |
| 2021 | A Leader's Day | Cast member | | |
| 2021–2022 | Tteokbokki House That Brother | Co-host | with Lee Yi-kyung and Kim Jong-min | |
| 2022 | Anti-Ageym | Cast Member | | |
| 2022 | Taste of Travel | Cast Member | | |

List of former programs
| Year | Title | Role | Note | Ref. |
|---|---|---|---|---|
| 1994 | Cheongchunsidae Yeolrinmadang (Note: Korean: 청춘시대 열린마당, lit. 'Youth open courts') | Host | | |
| 2003–2004 | Il-yoil-eun 101% (Note: Korean: 일요일은 101%, lit. '101% Sunday') | Host | | |
| 2004–2007 | Yeogeol six (Note: Korean: 여걸 식스, lit. 'Heroine six', also previously known as Yeogeol Paibeu, Korean: 여걸 파이브, lit. 'Heroine Five') | Host | | |
| 2004–2010 | Star Golden Bell | Host | | |
| 2005 | Mujigae (Note: Korean: 무지개, lit. 'Rainbow') | Host | | |
| 2006 | Star Daegyeokdol Cheonhabyeolmi (Note: Korean: 스타 대격돌 천하별미, lit. 'Star clash of heavenly delicacies') | Host | | |
| 2006–2007 | Amazing Asia | Host | | |
| 2006–2007 | Wigitalchul Number One (Note: Korean: 위기탈출 넘버원, lit. 'Emergency escape number one') | Host | | |
| 2007 | Segyero Gan Hangug-ui Mat (Note: Korean: 세계로 간 한국의 맛, lit. 'Taste of Korea that went to the world') | Host | | |
| 2007 | Super Action | Host | | |
| 2007 | Daehaksaeng Trot Gayoje (Note: Korean: 대학생 트로트 가요제, lit. 'University Student Trot Song Festival') | Judge | | |
| 2007 | Global Camera | Host | | |
| 2007–2008 | High-Five | Host | | |
| 2007–2008 | Jinsil Game (Note: Korean: 진실게임, lit. 'Truth Game') | Host | | |
| 2007–2008 | Cider | Host | | |
| 2008 | Show! Shin. Bal. Jang. (Note: Korean: 쇼! 신.발.장, lit. 'Show! Shoe cabinet') | Host | | |
| 2008 | Gag Battle, Utgyeoya Sanda (Note: Korean: 개그 배틀, 웃겨야 산다, lit. 'Gag battle, you have to be funny to live') | Contestant | | |
| 2008 | Sar-abopsida (Note: Korean: 살아봅시다, lit. 'Let's live') | Host | | |
| 2008 | 2008 Choegang Oegug-in Myeoneuri Yeoljeon (Note: Korean: 2008 최강 외국인 며느리 열전, lit. '2008 Strongest foreign daughter-in-law contest') | Host | | |
| 2008–2009 | Road Show Quiz Expedition | Host | | |
| 2009 | Star Dal-in Show (Note: Korean: 스타 달인 쇼, lit. 'Star master show') | Host | | |
| 2009 | Yeoyumanman (Note: Korean: 여유만만, lit. 'Just relax') | Host | | |
| 2009 | Seonsaengnim Osinda (Note: Korean: 선생님 오신다, lit. 'Teacher is coming') | Host | | |
| 2009 | Challenge! Golden Ladder | Host | | |
| 2009 | Shin Dong-yup's 300 | Contestant | Employee special episode | |
| 2010 | Big Star Family Daegyeokdol (Note: Korean: 빅스타 패밀리 대격돌, lit. 'Big star family clash') | Host | | |
| 2010 | Star Simbureum (Note: Korean: 스타심부름, lit. 'Star errand') | Host | | |
| 2010 | Isago: Bubu-ui Beopchik (Note: Korean: 이사고:부부의 법칙, lit. 'Isago: The Law of Married Couples') | Host | | |
| 2010 | Countdown Reality 24 Hours | Host | | |
| 2011 | Seolteukjib Global Star Cheongbaekjeon (Note: Korean: 설특집 글로벌 스타 청백전, lit. 'Lunar New Year Special Global Star Match') | Host | | |
| 2011 | Death Camp 24 Hours | Host | | |
| 2011 | Superstar K 3 | Contestant advisor | One episode | |
| 2011 | Dangsin-ui Seontaek Pangpangsho (Note: Korean: 당신의 선택 팡팡쇼, lit. 'Your Choice Bang Bang Show') | Host | | |
| 2012 | Illryureul Butakhae (Note: Korean: 인류를 부탁해, lit. 'Take care of humanity') | Host | Lunar new year special | |
| 2012 | Lunar New Year Special Live Good Luck Quiz Show | Host | | |
| 2012 | Survival King | Host | | |
| 2012 | Susanghan Sanggyeonlle (Note: Korean: 수상한 상견례, lit. 'Suspicious meeting') | Host | | |
| 2012 | Trot-ga Ganda (Note: Korean: 트로트가 간다, lit. 'Here comes Trot') | Host | | |
| 2012 | Love Call | Host | Pilot episode | |
| 2012 | Namnambungnyeo Romance (Note: Korean: 남남북녀 로맨스, lit. 'South man north woman Romance') | Host | | |
| 2015 | Same Bed, Different Dreams | Host | | |
| 2016 | Talk Hero | Host | | |
| 2017–2018 | Happy Together - Legendary Big Mouth | Cast member | | |
| 2018 | Royal Adventure | Member | | |

=== Web shows ===
| Year | Title | Role | Notes | Ref. |
|---|---|---|---|---|
| 2021 | Outrun by Running Man | Cast Member | Running Man spin-off | |
| 2023 | Bromarble | Cast Member | with Lee Seung-gi, Yoo Yeon-seok, Lee Dong-hwi, Kyuhyun, Joshua and Hoshi | |

=== Radio ===
| Year | Title | Network | Notes | Ref. |
|---|---|---|---|---|
| 2007 | Good Morning FM | MBC FM4U | DJ | |
| 2016–2019 | Jee Seok-jin's 2 O'Clock Date (2시의데이트 지석진입니다) | MBC FM4U | DJ | |
| 2021 | Noon's Hope Song, Kim Shin-young (정오의 희망곡 김신영 입니다) | MBC FM4U | Special DJ (with Parc Jae-jung) | |

=== Music video appearances ===
| Year | Song Title | Artist | Ref. |
|---|---|---|---|
| 2009 | "Utjja Utjja" (웃자웃자, 'Let's laugh') | Lee Kwang-gi | |
| 2021 | "Keep your head up" (네가 아는 너) | Lee Dong-hwi | |
| 2022 | "Do You Want to Hear" (듣고 싶을까) | MSG Wannabe MOM | |

== Awards and nominations ==
Name of the award ceremony, year presented, category, nominee of the awards, and the result of the nomination
| Award ceremony | Year | Category | Nominated work(s) | Result | Ref. |
|---|---|---|---|---|---|
| Blue Dragon Series Awards | 2024 | Best Male Entertainer | Bro & Marble in Dubai | Nominated | |
| KBS Entertainment Awards | 2004 | Excellence Award (MC) | Happy Sunday | Won | |
| KBS Entertainment Awards | 2006 | Excellence Award (Show Entertainment) | Happy Sunday – Yeogeol Six, Wigitalchul Number One and Star Golden Bell | Nominated | |
| KBS Entertainment Awards | 2007 | Excellence Award (Show Entertainment) | Star Golden Bell | Won | |
| MBC Entertainment Awards | 2021 | Best Teamwork | MSG Wannabe – Hangout with Yoo | Won | |
| Melon Music Awards | 2021 | Best Project Music | MSG Wannabe (M.O.M) | Won | |
| SBS Entertainment Awards | 2011 | Netizen Popularity Award | Running Man | Nominated | |
| SBS Entertainment Awards | 2012 | Excellence Award (Variety) | Running Man | Won | |
| SBS Entertainment Awards | 2013 | Best Couple Award | Jee Seok-jin (with Lee Kwang-soo); Running Man | Nominated | |
| SBS Entertainment Awards | 2013 | Viewer's Most Popular Award | With Running Man members | Won | |
| SBS Entertainment Awards | 2015 | Excellence Award (Variety) | Running Man | Won | |
| SBS Entertainment Awards | 2017 | Top Excellence Award (Variety) | Running Man | Won | |
| SBS Entertainment Awards | 2020 | Golden Content Award | With Running Man members | Won | |
| SBS Entertainment Awards | 2021 | Entertainer of the Year Award | Running Man | Won | |
| SBS Entertainment Awards | 2021 | Honorary Employee Award | Running Man | Won | |
| SBS Entertainment Awards | 2022 | Grand Prize | Jee Seok-jin (Running Man) | Nominated | |
| SBS Entertainment Awards | 2023 | Producer Award | Jee Seok-jin (Running Man) | Won | |
| Seoul Luxury Brand Model Awards | 2015 | Hallyu Entertainer | Jee Seok-jin | Won | |
| The 3rd Annual Pinggyego Awards! | 2025 | Daesang (Grand Prize) | Jee Seok-jin | Won | |
