= One Step (film) =

- Theatrical release poster
- Directed by: Juhn Jai-hong
- Written by: Juhn Jai-hong; Hong Seung-pyo; Park Ji-hyun
- Produced by: Jung Hee-sub
- Starring: Sandara Park; Han Jae-suk; Hong Ah-reum
- Production company: MCC Entertainment
- Distributed by: Dream Fact Entertainment
- Release date: April 6, 2017
- Running time: 88 minutes
- Country: South Korea
- Language: Korean
- Box office: US$11,619

One Step (Korean: 원스텝; RR: Wonseutep) is a 2017 South Korean musical drama film directed by Juhn Jai-hong and starring Sandara Park, Han Jae-suk, Cho Dong-in and Hong Ah-reum. Its production was inspired by the domestic Korean success of the American film, Begin Again.

== Plot ==
After being involved in a car accident, Si-hyun (Sandara Park) is left with no memories of the accident or her past. The accident causes her to see sounds in color which is often disorientating, forcing Si-hyun to protect her ears. She encounters Ji-won (Hong Ah-reum) in the hospital and moves in with her when she is later discharged. Upon hearing Si-hyun humming a strange melody in her sleep, Ji-won's brother, Woo-hyuk (Cho Dong-in), writes it down as a score and gives it to her, hoping that it would help her remember something of her former life. Meanwhile, Ji-il (Han Jae-suk), a failed songwriter stumbles upon this score and offers to find the melody. They embark on a healing journey as they collaborate to complete Si-hyun's melody.

== Cast ==
- Sandara Park as Si-hyun
  - Kang Ye-seo as Young Si-hyun
- Han Jae-suk as Ji-il
- Cho Dong-in as Woo-hyuk
- Hong Ah-reum as Ji-won
- Jo Dal-Hwan as Jung-hwan
- Park Seo-young as Keyboardist in Woo-hyuk's band
- Ha Hyun-gon as Woo-hyuk's band drum
- Bae Yong-geun as Record label CEO

== Release ==
In February 2017, it was revealed that the film was funded on a crowdfunding site.

It was released on May 10, 2017, in the Philippines and was distributed by Viva Films.
