= Sandara Park (EP) =

EP by Sandara Park
- Released: July 12, 2023
- Genre: Pop; R&B
- Length: 15:40
- Language: Korean
- Label: Abyss Company
- Producer: ARTiffect; Distract; Sophia Pae; Jeon Jin; Elum; Hoody; Gray; Heize; 623; Sunwoo Jung-a; Realmeee; Joo Young-hoon

Sandara Park chronology
Sandara: Ang Ganda Ko (2005)	Sandara Park (2023)

Singles from Sandara Park
- 1. "Festival" Released: July 12, 2023

Sandara Park is the second extended play (EP) by South Korean singer, actress and television presenter Sandara Park. It was released via Abyss Company on July 12, 2023, and marked the singer's first album release in South Korea and her first release overall in 14 years since the promotional single "Kiss" in 2009. The extended play features songwriting and production contributions from Sunwoo Jung-a, Hoody, Gray, and Heize. The release of Sandara Park was supported by the single "Festival", which heavily samples Uhm Jung-hwa's 1999 song of the same name from the album 005.1999.06.

== Background and release ==
In February 2023, Sandara Park expressed via her social media accounts about working on her first solo album in South Korea. She noted that the extended play would feature songs from various genres, highlighting her involvement in the album development process. In late-June 2023, Park announced that her first digital extended play would be released the following month on July 12. The announcement was accompanied by a teaser, which unveiled an amusement park-themed visual concept that plays on the singer's last name "Park".

The EP marked her first release since her departure from YG Entertainment following the expiration of her contract in May 2021, and her first musical release overall in 14 years since "Kiss" in September 2009.

== Track listing ==
Sandara Park track listing
No.	Title	Lyrics	Music	Arrangement	Length
1.	"Festival"	B&NAz (153/Joombas); Joo Young-hoon; Sandara Park	Jake K (ARTiffect); MCK (ARTiffect); Distract; Sophia Pae; Joo Young-hoon	Jake K (ARTiffect); MCK (ARTiffect)	3:10
2.	"Play!"	Ahn Shin-ae; Sunwoo Jung-a; Zesvine (ARTiffect); Ga Eun	Jeon Jin; Elum	Jeon Jin	3:12
3.	"Dara Dara"	Hoody; Gray	Hoody; Gray	Gray	3:14
4.	"T Map"	Heize; Sandara Park	Heize; 623	Heize; 623	2:58
5.	"Happy Ending"	Sunwoo Jung-a; Realmeee	Realmeee; Sunwoo Jung-a	Sunwoo Jung-a; Realmeee	3:04
Total length:					15:40

=== Notes ===
- All track titles are stylized in all caps.
- "Festival" contains a portion of the composition from the song of the same name, written by Joo Young-hoon, performed by Uhm Jung-hwa.

== Release history ==
Release history for Sandara Park
Region	Date	Format	Label
Various	July 12, 2023	Digital download; streaming	Abyss Company; Kakao Entertainment
