= The Sound of Heart =

2006–2020 South Korean webtoon

The Sound of Your Heart
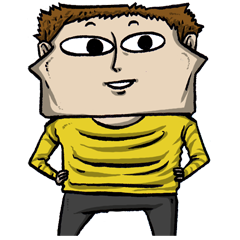
- Jo Seok in his own artstyle

마음의 소리 RR: Maeumui sori MR: Maŭmŭi sori
- Genre: Comedy
- Author: Jo Seok
- Illustrator: Jo Seok
- Publisher: Webtoon
- English publisher: Line Webtoon
- Original run: 2006–2020

The Sound of Your Heart (Korean: 마음의 소리; also known as Sound of Heart) is a South Korean webtoon series written and illustrated by Jo Seok. It was first released on the Naver's Webtoon internet portal in 2006. The first print volume was released in 2007, after which The Sound of Your Heart was adapted into a drama of the same name in 2015. It was completed in July 2020.

== Development ==
Jo Seok graduated from Jeonju University with a major in video cultural studies in 2002, and wanted to infuse an interest in cartoons to those who haven't been fans of graphic novels. Jo began posting The Sound of Heart on Naver Webtoon in September 2006, and by 2014 it was the longest running webtoon on the platform. On December 17, 2015, the 1,000th episode of The Sound of Heart was posted on Naver. Since Jo started posting his webcomic on Naver, views averaged 5 million per update, a total of over 5 billion views.

When Jo got married in 2014, he did not have a wedding ceremony or honeymoon trip because he did not want a lapse in his update schedule. In 2015, Jo earned about ₩78,000,000 per month (approximately ₩936,000,000 per year).

Jo published other webcomics on Naver Webtoon during the run of The Sound of Heart, such as Jo's Area and Moon You. The Sound of Heart concluded in July 2020, after running for 14 years. Jo said he felt "lucky to be able to feel 'done' with the comic." During its run, the webtoon accumulated nearly 7 billion views and 15 million comments. 500 episodes had been translated into English by the time The Sound of Heart concluded.

== Characters ==
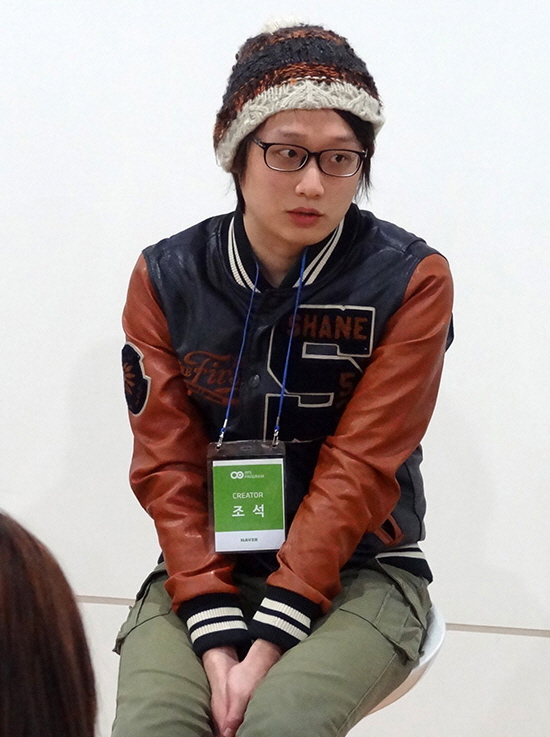
The Sound of Heart features author Jo Seok as the main character.

Most characters The Sound of Heart are based on people in the author's life.

=== Main ===
- Jo Seok: The author himself in his comic.
- Choi Ae-bong: Jo's girlfriend, and, since June 2014, wife.
- Jo Joon: Jo's brother.
- Jo Chul-wang: Jo's father, the owner of a chicken restaurant who is former a rugby player.
- Kwon Jeong-kwon: Jo's mother.
- Jo Yool-bong: Jo and Ae-bong's daughter.
- Choi Ko-bong: Ae-bong's younger brother who works as an internet instructor and police officer.

=== Dogs ===
- Sensation and Hengbong are Jo's pet dogs
- Sol and Taeyang, dogs raised at Ae-bong's house.
- Kobongi, Ae-bong's pet dog

=== Jo's Friends ===
- Kim Joong-woo: General editor of Naver Webtoon.
- Buwook: Flower human.
- Seouldae: Buwook's elder brother whose name is short for Seoul National University.

== Other media ==
On November 7, 2016, airline carrier Air Seoul announced that it had collaborated with Naver Webtoon to produce pre-flight safety video. Characters from The Sound of Heart were featured in the video, alongside characters from webtoons such as Denma and Noblesse.

=== Animated series ===
On September 20, 2018, the first animated short series based on The Sound of Heart was released on Naver WEBTOON YouTube Channel.

=== Television series ===
KBS had been planning a TV series involving The Sound of Heart since 2015. Lee Kwang-soo and Jung So-min respectively were chosen to portray Jo Seok and Choi Ae-bong.

=== Mobile game ===
Korean mobile game company Neowiz Games released a Mobile RPG adaption of The Sound of Heart on Google Play in April 2016. Despite being free-to-play, it includes some paid item payment features. Its latest update was April 24, 2019.
