= Jung Ji-yoon =

South Korean actress (born 1984)

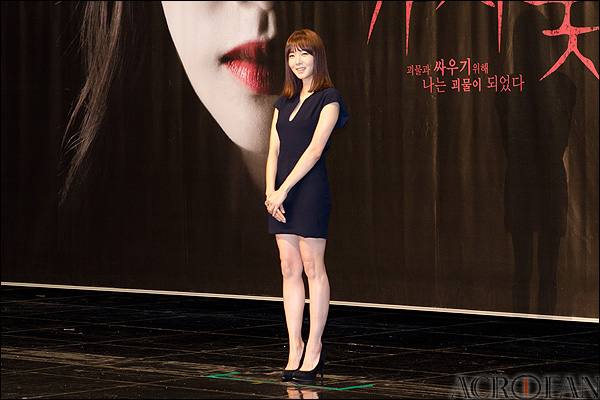
- Jung in 2013
- Born: 22 November 1984 (age 41); Seoul, South Korea
- Occupation: Actress
- Years active: 2010–present
- Agent: Six Oceans
- Known for: Vincenzo; Triangle; Dr. Ian

Jung Ji-yoon is a South Korean actress. She is known for her roles in dramas such as Triangle, Dr. Ian and Vincenzo. She also appeared in movies Confession, Traffickers and The Con Artists.

== Filmography ==
=== Television series ===
Year	Title	Role	Ref.
2011	Sign	Secretary for lead prosecutor	
2012	Ji Woon-soo's Stroke of Luck	Reporter	
2013	Drama Festival: "Surviving in Africa"	Hyung Taek's wife	
2013	Flower of Revenge	Chun Soo-ji	
2014	Triangle	Kang Hyun-mi	
2015	KBS Drama Special: "The Last Puzzle"	Min-ju	
2015	Dr. Ian	Jang Jae-hee	
2018	Return	Ms. Kyung	
2018	Top Star U-back	Cha-e	
2019	Flower Crew: Joseon Marriage Agency	Do-joon's mother	
2020	Touch	Na Hye-jin	
2021	Vincenzo	Ms Yang	
2021	The Veil	Kim Yeo-jin	
2022	Behind Every Star	Dress Shop Employee	
2024	Who Is She	Kang Yeong-eun	

=== Film ===
Year	Title	Role	Ref.
2012	Traffickers	Chae-hee	
2013	Mr. Go	Home shopping show host	
2014	Confession	Mi-ran	
2014	The Con Artists	Technician assistant	
2015	Wonderful Nightmare	Pharmacist	

== Awards and nominations ==
Name of the award ceremony, year presented, category, nominee of the award, and the result of the nomination
Award ceremony	Year	Category	Nominee / Work	Result	Ref.
Blue Dragon Film Awards	2012	Best New Actress	Traffickers	Nominated	
