= Dr. Ian =

- Also known as: Dr. Mo's Clinic
- Genre: Romance; Drama
- Written by: Lee Aram
- Directed by: Kwon Hyuk-chan
- Starring: Sandara Park; Kim Young-kwang
- Country of origin: South Korea
- Original language: Korean
- No. of episodes: 9

Production
- Producer: Kim Ki-yoon
- Production location: Korea
- Running time: Mondays, Tuesday, Wednesday, and Sundays at 10:30 and 0:00 (KST)

Original release
- Network: Naver TVcast; Youku
- Release: 29 March – 8 April 2015

Dr. Ian (Korean: Dr. 이안) is a South Korean–China joint project web series starring Sandara Park and Kim Young-kwang in leading roles. The drama has garnered 1,774,308 views on Naver as of May 2016.

== Plot ==
Lee So-dam (Sandara Park), is a quirky office girl who covers her face with her long hair whenever she feels uncomfortable. After being dumped by her boyfriend, she seeks the help of psychiatrist Dr. Mo Ian (Kim Young-kwang), who specializes in hypnosis treatments. He also bears scars of his own from a past relationship. During their sessions, they begin to heal the damage that love caused them together.

== Cast ==
- Kim Young-kwang as Dr. Ian/Mo Yi-an
- Sandara Park as Lee So-dam
- Kim Ho-chang as Jung Tae-soo
- Jung Ji-yoon as Jang Jae-hee
- Choi Dae-sung as Chief Young
- Kris Cho as Oh Heung-yeol

== Production ==
As early as January 2015, it was announced that Sandara Park and Kim Young-kwang were to be the leads in a new web-drama. This is Park's first leading acting role in seven years since leaving the Philippines. Dr. Ian is jointly produced between South Korean channel Naver and Chinese streaming service Youku. The director, Kwon Hyeok-chan, previously directed hit dramas as Secret Garden, A Gentleman's Dignity, and Master's Sun. Filming began in early February and the first script reading was held successfully around the same time.

== Reception ==
The series was highly anticipated as it marked Park's official reentry into the field since moving back to South Korea. The series was globally popular, catching on in regions such as the United States, Taiwan, and Thailand. Since its release, the drama has amassed views of nearly 2 million.

== Episodes ==
| Episode # | Original broadcast date | Episode title |
|---|---|---|
| 1 | 29 March 2015 | Welcome to the clinic |
| 2 | 29 March 2015 | The woman who became like abandoned trash |
| 3 | 30 March 2015 | The man who was like trash |
| 4 | 31 March 2015 | Why Snow White ate the poisoned apple |
| 5 | 1 April 2015 | How to part from LTE |
| 6 | 5 April 2015 | Just saw a pretty woman |
| 7 | 6 April 2015 | The man who lives in an everlasting break-up |
| 8 | 7 April 2015 | When the string of fate is loosened |
| 9 | 8 April 2015 | Happily ever after |

== Soundtrack ==
Dr. Ian Original Sound Track

Soundtrack album by Various Artists
- Released: Unreleased
- Genres: Pop, K-pop, soundtrack, R&B
- Label: YG Entertainment

Disc 1:
| No. | Title | Artist | Length |
|---|---|---|---|
| 1. | "사랑떼" | Lucia |
| 2. | "좋아" (Like) | Lucia feat Epitone Project |
| 3. | "착하지 않아서" | Cold Cherry |
| 4. | "너와 난 무슨 사이였을까" | Cold Cherry |
| 5. | "무제" (Untitled) | The Groo |
| 6. | "눈물 비" (Rain Tears) | JL |
| 7. | "Best Friends" | Zion feat Big Mama |
| 8. | "미워할수 없는 너" (Unable To Hate You) | Zion |

== Awards and nominations ==
| Year | Award | Category | Recipient | Result |
|---|---|---|---|---|
| 2015 | KWeb Festival | Best Actor | Kim Young-kwang | Won |
| 2015 | KWeb Festival | Best Actress | Sandara Park | Won |
