= The Sound of Your Heart (TV series) =

2016 South Korean television series

- Official Poster
- Also known as: Sound of Your Heart; The Sound of Your Mind; Sound of Heart
- Genre: Sitcom
- Based on: The Sound of Heart (Webtoon) by Jo Seok
- Written by: Lee Byung-hoon
- Directed by: Ha Byung-hoon
- Starring: Lee Kwang-soo; Jung So-min
- Country of origin: South Korea
- Original language: Korean
- No. of episodes: 20

Production
- Executive producers: Seo Soo-min; Choi Yong-seob; Kwan Young
- Producer: Sung-won Cho
- Running time: 15 mins
- Production companies: Kross Pictures; The Sound of Your Heart SPC

Original release
- Network: KBS2; Naver TV Cast; Sohu TV
- Release: 7 November – 9 December 2016

The Sound of Your Heart (Korean: 마음의 소리; RR: Maeumui sori) is a South Korean television series starring Lee Kwang-soo and Jung So-min. The sitcom is based on the webtoon of the same name. The first 10 episodes were aired as a web series on 7 November 2016 through Naver TV Cast on Mondays at 6:00 (KST), and the remaining 10 episodes aired from December 2016. The web series hit 100 million views on Sohu TV and ranked No. 1 among Korean dramas on the site. On Naver TV Cast, the web series has more than 40 million views in South Korea as of February 2017. It is also now airing on Netflix.

== Plot ==
Stories about Cho Seok's (Lee Kwang-soo) adventures with his family and his girlfriend Aebong (Jung So-min).

== Cast ==
=== Main cast ===
- Lee Kwang-soo as Jo Seok, a webtoon artist who lives with his parents
- Kim Dae-myung as Jo Joon, Jo Seok's older brother, who works at an entertainment company
- Jung So-min as Choi Ae-bong, Jo Seok's new girlfriend, whom she knew since high school
- Kim Byeong-ok as Jo Chul-wang, Jo Seok's father, who works a chicken shop that barely gets customers (due in part to closing early half the time)
- Kim Mi-kyung as Kwon Jung-kwon, Jo Seok's mother. who has grown fed up with her life.

=== Others ===
- Kim Kang-hyun as manager
- Yoo Hyun-jung as Jo Seok's friend
- Yein as female student
- Lee Jae-wook as teacher / resident 1
- Moon Ji-yoon as Jo-suk's colleague
- Choi Dae-sung as taxi driver
- Jung Ji-won as news announcer
- In Sung-ho as association staff
- Keum Kwang-san as Chul-wang's challenger
- Lee Jin-mok as Chul-wang's friend 1
- Lee Kwan-yeong as Chul-wang's friend 2
- Lim Jae-joon as Kim Suk's boyfriend
- Oh Min-suk
- So Yi-hyun

=== Special appearances ===
- Jo Seok as author Jo
- Song Joong-ki as friend
- Yeom Dong-heon as Manager Lee
- Seo Hyun-chul as Vice Head of a Division Oh
- Choi Yang-rak as photographer
- Moon Kyung-ja as Green Juice woman
- Kim Sook as Kim Sook
- Kang Kyun-sung as Kang Kyun-sung
- Jung I-rang as young woman
- Park Na-rae as Park Na-rae
- Yoon Jin-yi as Fake Ae-bong
- Kim Roi-ha as Mac president
- Lee Soo-ji as Voice phishing
- Kim Min-kyung as hunting woman
- Woo Hyun as Choi Ae-bong's father (Ep. 13).
- Cao Lu as woman in hotel room
- Tae Won-seok as naked man in China hotel room
- Jung Joon-young as neighbor in Apt. 205
- Kim Se-jeong as neighbor in Apt. 205
- Kim Tae-won as himself
- Shin Dong-yup as himself
- Jun Hyun-moo as himself
- Lena Park as herself
- Park Seul-ki as herself
- Laboum as themselves
- Ahn Sol-bin as herself
- Kim Jong-kook as Jo Seok's twin cousins Jo Jong-kook and Jo Jong-wook
- Gong Seung-yeon as Yerim

== Production ==
First script reading took place 24 March 2016 at KBS Annex Broadcasting Station in Yeouido, South Korea. The filming took 52 days, it began in March and ended in May.

== Ratings ==
- In the table below, the blue numbers represent the lowest ratings and the red numbers represent the highest ratings.

Episode #	Original broadcast date	Average audience share			
Episode #	Original broadcast date	TNmS Ratings		AGB Nielsen Ratings	
Episode #	Original broadcast date	Nationwide	Seoul	Nationwide	Seoul
1	9 December 2016	4.9%	5.4%	5.7%	6.2%
2	16 December 2016	3.9%	4.7%	3.4%	4.2%
3	23 December 2016	3.9%	4.4%	4.2%	4.7%
4	30 December 2016	4.4%	5.0%	4.3%	4.9%
5	1 January 2017	4.2%	4.4%	4.7%	4.9%
Average		4.3%	4.8%	4.5%	5.0%

== Awards and nominations ==
Year	Award	Category	Recipient	Result
2016	15th KBS Entertainment Awards	Hot Issue Programme	The Sound of Your Heart	Won
2016	15th KBS Entertainment Awards	Best Couple	Lee Kwang-soo and Jung So-min	Won
