= Speed Angels =

- Film poster
- Directed by: Jingle Ma
- Written by: Jingle Ma; Chen Shu
- Produced by: Tu Lili; Hou Jidong; Li Xiaoping
- Starring: Tang Wei; Rene Liu; Han Jae-suk; Jimmy Lin; Cecilia Cheung
- Cinematography: Jingle Ma; Tony Cheung; Chan Chi-ying; Chan Kwok-hung
- Edited by: Eric Kwong Chi-Leung; Wong Hoi
- Music by: Peter Kam; Han Feng
- Production companies: Beijing Enlight Pictures; Golden Scene
- Release date: December 28, 2011
- Running time: 117 minutes
- Country: China
- Language: Mandarin

Speed Angels (simplified Chinese: 极速天使; traditional Chinese: 極速天使) is a 2011 Chinese sports action drama film directed by Jingle Ma. It stars Tang Wei, Rene Liu, Han Jae-suk, Jimmy Lin, and Cecilia Cheung. The film was theatrically released on December 28, 2011.

== Plot ==
Han Bing and You Mei are best friends and star racers for the elite Speed Angels team, dominating the circuit with their skill and teamwork. But when they both fall for the same man, their bond shatters. Betrayal leads to a heated confrontation, a tragic accident that leaves Han Bing's younger sister permanently injured, and the team losing its top drivers. Struggling with guilt, Han Bing drowns her sorrows in alcohol, while You Mei disappears without a trace. With Speed Angels in decline, the team seems destined for failure, until an unexpected opportunity arises.

A year later, Han Bing is recruited to rejoin Speed Angels for the first-ever Asia Women's Cup, a high-stakes international competition. Desperate for prize money to fund her sister's surgery, she reluctantly agrees but under one condition: she needs a partner who can match her skill. Enter Hong Xiaoyi, a fearless taxi driver with a gift for high-speed maneuvers but a deep-seated stage fright stemming from childhood trauma. Though talented, Xiaoyi struggles under pressure, forcing Han Bing to decide if she's willing to take a chance on an unproven rookie.

As the team fights to reclaim its former glory, powerful rivals emerge, resorting to underhanded tactics to ensure Flash Speed's downfall. When Han Bing's past comes back to haunt her, she is forced to face You Mei, now racing for the opposition. Old wounds are reopened as personal grudges mix with professional ambition, escalating the battle beyond the track. Meanwhile, Xiaoyi struggles under the pressure, and as the stakes grow higher, both racers must prove they have what it takes to win.

As the final race approaches, tensions reach a boiling point. When an ambush leaves Xiaoyi injured, Han Bing realizes that winning isn't just about personal redemption—it's about fighting for those who believe in her. With the odds stacked against them, she and Xiaoyi make one last stand in a breathtaking, high-speed showdown where skill, strategy, and courage will decide their fate.

== Cast ==
- Tang Wei as Hong Xiaoyi
- Rene Liu as Han Bing
- Han Jae-suk as Gao Feng
- Jimmy Lin as Joe
- Cecilia Cheung as You Mei
- Cheng Pei-pei as Xiaoyi's mother
- Chie Tanaka as Sanoka
