= Choi Dae-sung =

South Korean actor

- Born: February 2, 1976 (age 50); South Korea
- Occupation: Actor

Korean name
- Hangul: 최대성
- RR: Choe Daeseong
- MR: Ch'oe Taesŏng

Choi Dae-sung (born February 2, 1976) is a South Korean actor.

== Filmography ==
=== Film ===
Year	Title	Role
2002	True Colors of a Gangster	Myung-suk
2004	Rikidōzan	
2006	The Host	Duck boat man
2007	M	Min-woo's friend
2008	The Good, the Bad, the Weird	Japanese gentleman
2008	Portrait of a Beauty	Police bureau patrolman 2
2008	Romantic Island	Manager
2009	Soon-ji	Ddak-sae
2010	Blades of Blood	Im Chul-min's subordinate
2010	Bloody Shake	Young man 3 / moneylender
2011	Battlefield Heroes	Shilla, Sangjoo soldier
2011	Drifting Away	Daehangno passerby
2011	Hit	Director 2
2013	Rockin' on Heaven's Door	Male volunteer
2015	Alive	Dae-seong
2015	Snowy Road	Comfort women recruiter
2016	Kissing Cousin	Cafe manager
2016	Luck Key	Director 2
2017	Snowy Road	Pro-Japanese man

=== Television series ===
Year	Title	Role
2008	Beethoven Virus	
2009	The City Hall	"Eraser"
2009	You're Beautiful	CF director (cameo)
2010	Definitely Neighbors	
2010	Daemul	
2010	Secret Garden	Department head Choi
2011	Believe in Love	
2011	The Greatest Love	
2011	Lie to Me	Supermarket owner
2011	Spy Myung-wol	
2012	Welcome Rain to My Life	Jo Ki-dong
2013	Gu Family Book	
2013	I Can Hear Your Voice	Chief clerk Yang
2013	Potato Star 2013QR3	Kim Yoon-chul
2013	Golden Rainbow	Officer Lee
2013	Let's Eat	Laundromat boss
2013	My Love from the Star	
2014	Only Love	Chief Joo
2015	Dr. Ian	Chief Young
2015	Six Flying Dragons	
2015	Sweet, Savage Family	Yoon Tae-soo's friend, fish-shaped bun seller
2016	Monster	
2016	The Master of Revenge	Na Won-sang
2016	Bring It On, Ghost	Sauna's owner (cameo, episode 4)
2016	Cinderella with Four Knights	Man in cloth store (cameo, episode 1)
2016	Woman with a Suitcase	Go Goo-tae
2016	The Sound of Your Heart	Taxi driver
2016	The Shining Eun-soo	Yong-sik
2017	Live Up to Your Name	Heo-im's teacher
2017	A Korean Odyssey	Broadcasting station PD
2020	Hi Bye, Mama!	Kwon Man-seok
2020	Lie After Lie	Seo Hyeong-guk
