= Confession (2014 film) =

2014 South Korean neo-noir film

- Theatrical poster
- Hangul: 좋은 친구들
- Hanja: 좋은 親舊들
- RR: Joeun chingudeul
- MR: Choŭn ch'in'gudŭl
- Directed by: Lee Do-yun
- Written by: Lee Do-yun
- Produced by: Lee Tae-hun; Choi Nak-kwon
- Starring: Ji Sung; Ju Ji-hoon; Lee Kwang-soo
- Cinematography: Yu Eok
- Edited by: Steve M. Choe
- Music by: Jang Young-gyu
- Production company: Opus Pictures
- Distributed by: CJ Entertainment
- Release date: July 10, 2014
- Running time: 114 minutes
- Country: South Korea
- Language: Korean
- Box office: US$2,801,991

Confession (Korean: 좋은 친구들; RR: Joeun chingudeul; lit. 'Good Friends') is a 2014 South Korean neo-noir crime thriller film starring Ji Sung, Ju Ji-hoon and Lee Kwang-soo.

== Plot ==
Hyun-tae, In-chul and Min-soo have been best friends since childhood. Hyun-tae is a paramedic with a daughter in kindergarten, In-chul is a con man who works at an insurance company, and Min-soo is a small business owner. Hyun-tae's mother, who owns an illegal gambling arcade, asks In-chul to stage a robbery/arson of her arcade to get an insurance settlement. But when it results in her accidental death, the friends have a falling out and their relationships with each other are forever changed.

== Cast ==
- Ji Sung as Im Hyun-tae
  - Baek Seung-hwan as young Im Hyun-tae
- Ju Ji-hoon as Jung In-chul
  - Jeon Ji-hwan as young Jung In-chul
- Lee Kwang-soo as Kim Min-soo
  - Ham Sung-min as young Kim Min-soo
- Lee Hwi-hyang as Hyun-tae's mother
- Ki Gook-seo as Hyun-tae's father
- Choi Jin-ho as Shin Yi Soo
- Jung Ji-yoon as Mi-ran
- Jang Hee-jin as Ji-hyang
- Choi Byung-mo as Jae-gyu
- Ri Min as Detective Choi
- Hwang Chae-won as Yoo-ri
- Yang Jae-young as Ho-sung
- Park Sang-hyeon as Department head Kim
- Lee Young-soo as Detective Lee
- Ham Sung-min as Min-soo
- Nam Moon-cheol as Chief of police
- Kwak Min-seok as Center head
- Jeon In-geol as Assassin

== Awards and nominations ==
Year	Award	Category	Recipient	Result
2014	51st Grand Bell Awards	Best New Director	Lee Do-yun	Nominated
2014	51st Grand Bell Awards	Best Screenplay	Lee Do-yun	Nominated
2014	51st Grand Bell Awards	Best Editing	Steve M. Choe	Nominated
