= KCM =

KCM may refer to:

- KCM (singer), a South Korean singer
- KCM, a single task Prolog co-processor with private memory of the 1990s
- Kansas City, Missouri, a city that borders between the states of Missouri and Kansas
- Kathmandu College of Management
- Katie Couric Media, a multimedia news and production company
- Kenneth Copeland § Kenneth Copeland Ministries, a Christian televangelist ministry
- Kerala Congress (Mani), a political party in Kerala, India
- Postal code for Kerċem, Gozo Island, Malta
- King County Metro, public transit authority of King County
- Knight Commander of the Royal Order of Monisaraphon
- Konkola Copper Mines, a Zambian company
- Kosovo Campaign Medal, a U.S. military medal
