= Lee Kwang-soo =

South Korean actor (born 1985)

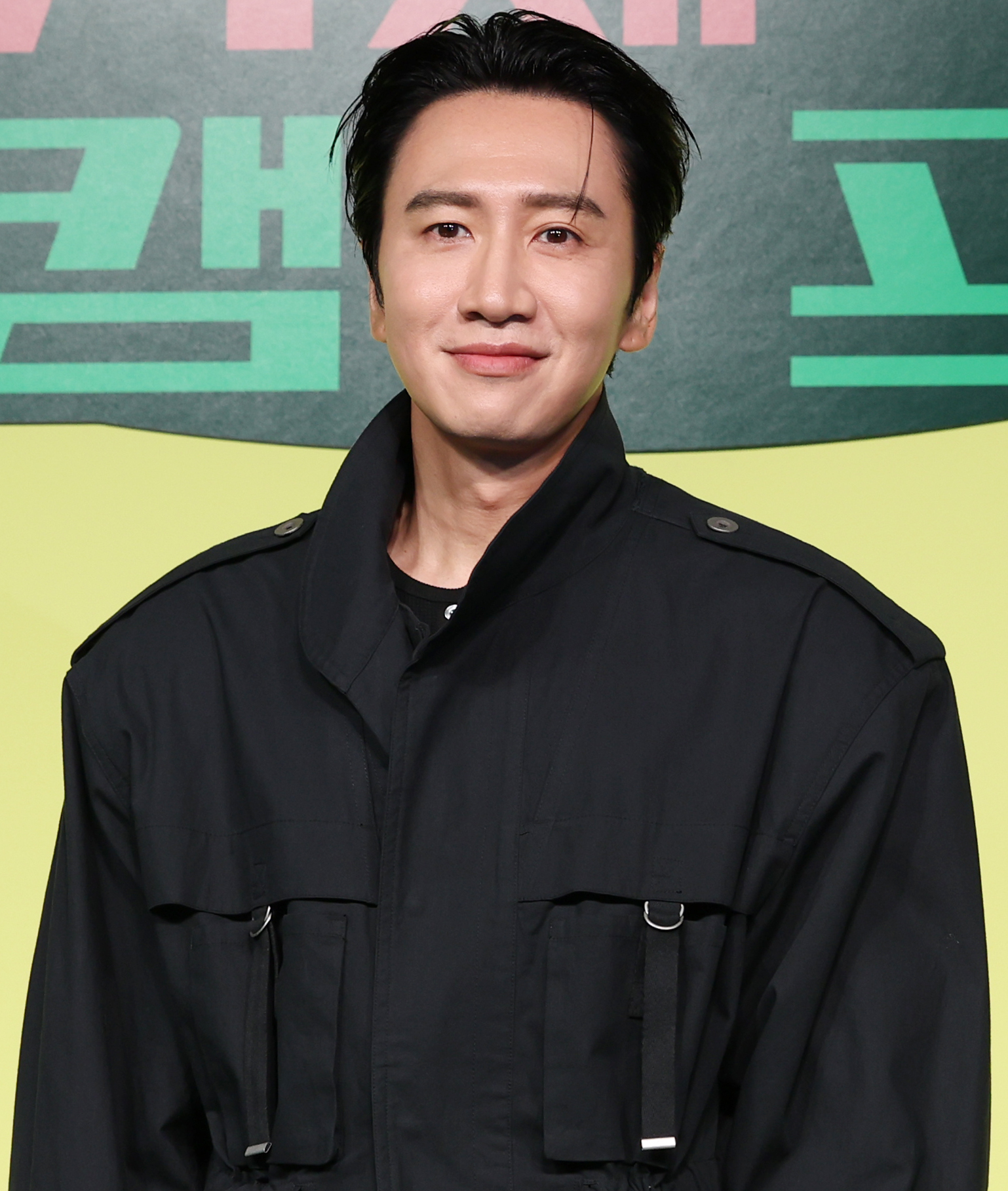
- Lee in 2026
- Born: July 14, 1985 (age 41); Namyangju, South Korea
- Education: Dong-ah Institute of Media and Arts (Broadcasting)
- Occupations: Actor; entertainer; model
- Years active: 2007–present
- Agent: King Kong by Starship
- Height: 192 cm (6 ft 3 1/2 in)

Korean name
- Hangul: 이광수
- Hanja: 李光洙
- RR: I Gwangsu
- MR: I Kwangsu
- Website: starship-ent.com

Lee Kwang-soo (Korean: 이광수, born July 14, 1985) is a South Korean actor, entertainer, and model. He made his acting debut in the sitcom Here He Comes (2008) and received further recognition for his roles in medical melodrama It's Okay, That's Love (2014), neo-noir film Confession (2014), black comedy film Collective Invention (2015), sitcom The Sound of Your Heart (2016), drama Live (2018), and human comedy film Inseparable Bros (2019).

Lee was a regular cast member of the South Korean variety show Running Man from June 2010 until May 2021, while his last appearance on the show was aired on June 13, 2021.

== Life and career ==
Lee was born on July 14, 1985, in Namyangju, South Korea.

Lee began his entertainment career as a model in 2007. He made his acting debut in the 2008 sitcom Here He Comes, which was followed by High Kick Through the Roof.

Lee's popularity increased after joining SBS' Good Sunday variety show Running Man, gaining the nickname "Prince of Asia" by his fans. In 2010 and 2011, Lee won back-to-back awards at the SBS Entertainment Awards for "New Star Award" and "Best Newcomer in Variety", respectively.

In 2012, Lee played supporting roles in the romantic comedies Wonderful Radio and All About My Wife, and thriller The Scent. Later in the year, he reunited onscreen with his former Running Man co-star and real-life best friend Song Joong-ki in the TV melodrama The Innocent Man.

In 2013, after another supporting role in A Wonderful Moment, Lee voiced the lead character Marco in the animated movie Maritime Police Marco, opposite fellow Running Man regular Song Ji-hyo, who voiced for Lulu.

Lee had publicly stated that he wanted to play an antagonist in TV or film. He was then cast as Prince Imhae (villainous brother to King Gwanghae) in the 2013 period drama Goddess of Fire. While filming Goddess of Fire, he participated in an energy conservation campaign alongside child actress Kim Yoo-bin.

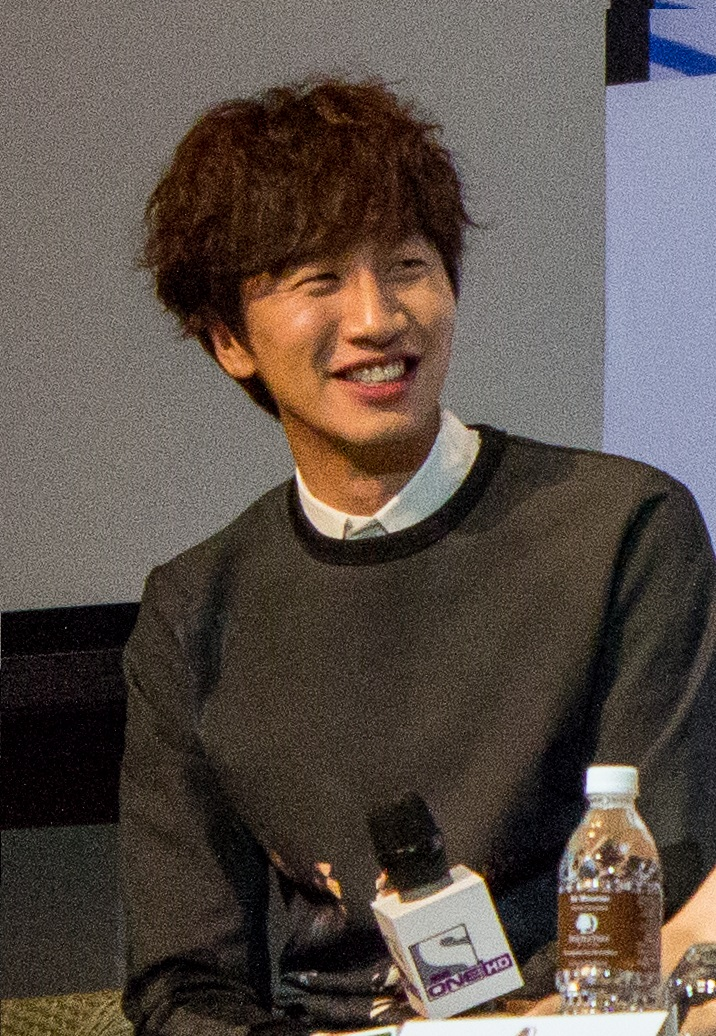
Lee in November 2014

In 2014, Lee played his first major role on the big screen in Confession. The neo-noir film is about three friends (played by Ji Sung, Ju Ji-hoon, and Lee) whose friendship gets destroyed after getting involved in a murder case. He then returned to television with the medical melodrama It's Okay, That's Love, playing a patient suffering from Tourette syndrome, a neurological disorder characterized by repetitive, stereotyped, involuntary movements and vocalizations called tics. Lee then starred in the film A Dynamite Family, about five bickering brothers living in the village of Deoksu.

In 2015, Lee played the protagonist in Collective Invention, whose condition is caused by side effects from a newly introduced drug. Collective Invention was screened in the Vanguard section of the 2015 Toronto International Film Festival, marking Lee's first red carpet appearance at an international film festival. He also starred in the two-episode drama Puck!, where he played a loan shark who joins a college ice hockey club. The one-act play was aired on January 1, 2016. The same year, he was appointed ambassador of the "2015 Korea Brand & Entertainment Expo" and received commendation from the trade minister for boosting the Korean Wave industry.

In 2016, Lee starred in tvN's Entourage, a South Korean remake of the American series. He was then cast in the KBS sitcom The Sound of Your Heart, based on the webtoon of the same name. The web drama was a success in both South Korea and China, gaining 100 million on Sohu TV and ranked No. 1 among Korean dramas on the site.

In September 2017, it was confirmed that Lee would be a fixed cast member in Netflix's variety show Busted!.

In 2018, Lee starred in Noh Hee-kyung's slice-of-life Live playing a police officer who tries to uphold values in everyday life and maintain justice. The drama was a success and Lee received rave reviews for his performance. He then played a Mensa genius in crime comedy The Accidental Detective 2: In Action, a sequel to the 2015 film.

In 2019, Lee starred in human comedy Inseparable Bros and gambling film Tazza: One Eyed Jack. He won his first Baeksang Arts Awards award for Best Supporting Actor and was nominated for Best Supporting Actor at the Blue Dragon Film Awards for his outstanding portrayal of Park Dong-goo who suffers from severe intellectual disabilities in Inseparable Bros, with critics citing "it was like seeing Dustin Hoffman in Rain Man".

On February 15, 2020, Lee was involved in a car accident which put all of his activities on pause until his recovery from ankle injury. Later in June, it was confirmed that he would be starring in The Pirates: The Last Royal Treasure, a sequel to the 2014 film. The film was released in January 2022.

In 2021, Lee returned to the Season 3 of Netflix variety show Busted!. Later in April 2021, Lee confirmed the film A Year-End Medley, which was released in the same year. On April 27, 2021, Lee's agency announced that he will be stepping down from Running Man to focus on treatment and recovery from the accident (2020). His last recording took place on May 24, 2021. In 2022, Lee starred in the tvN drama The Killer's Shopping List, marking his return to the small screen after four years. His work also includes films Sinkhole and A Year-End Medley. He received his second nomination for Best Supporting Actor at the Blue Dragon Film Awards for his work in Sinkhole.

In November 2024, Lee Kwang-soo's agency King Kong by Starship confirmed his appearance in Disney+ series The Manipulated as Baek Do-kyung.

In 2025, Lee starred in Netflix's crime thriller television series Karma directed by Lee Il-hyung. It is based on the Kakao webtoon of the same name by Choi Hee-seon, about people who are unexpectedly entangled and destroy each other while pursuing their own desires.

== Personal life ==
=== Relationship ===
On December 31, 2018, it was reported that Lee had been dating actress Lee Sun-bin, with King Kong by Starship stating that the couple had been dating "for 5 months" prior to the announcement of their relationship.

== Filmography ==
=== Film ===
Year	Title	Role	Ref.
2011	Battlefield Heroes	Moon-di	
2012	Wonderful Radio	Cha Dae-geun	
2012	The Scent	Gi-poong	
2012	All About My Wife	PD Choi	
2013	A Wonderful Moment	Kim Jung-il	
2013	Maritime Police Marco	Marco	
2013	Walking with Dinosaurs 3D	Patchi	
2014	Confession	Min-soo	
2014	A Dynamite Family	Constable Park	
2015	Collective Invention	Park Goo	
2018	The Accidental Detective 2: In Action	Yeo Chi	
2019	Inseparable Bros	Park Dong-goo	
2019	Tazza: One Eyed Jack	Jo Kka-chi	
2021	Sinkhole	Kim Seung-hyun	
2021	A Year-End Medley	Sang-hoon	
2022	The Pirates: The Last Royal Treasure	Mak-yi	
2025	Love Barista	Kang Jun-woo	

=== Television series ===
Year	Title	Role	Notes	Ref.
2008	The Scale of Providence	Oh Kwang-chul		
2008–2009	Here He Comes	Oh Man-soo		
2009–2010	High Kick Through the Roof	Lee Kwang-soo		
2010	Dong Yi	Park Young-dal		
2011	City Hunter	Go Ki-joon		
2011–2012	Bachelor's Vegetable Store	Nam Yoo-bong		
2012	The Innocent Man	Park Jae-gil		
2013	Dating Agency: Cyrano	Choi Dal-in	Cameo (episode 6–8)	
2013	Goddess of Fire	Prince Imhae		
2013	Potato Star 2013QR3	Bo-young's first love	Cameo (episode 18)	
2014	Secret Love	Lee Tae-yang	Episode 7–8: "A Seven Day Summer"	
2014	It's Okay, That's Love	Park Soo-kwang		
2015	A Girl Who Sees Smells	Himself	Cameo (episode 1) with Running Man members	
2016	Puck!	Jo Joon-man		
2016	Descendants of the Sun	Toy gun range shooting shop worker	Cameo (episode 1)	
2016	Dear My Friends	Yoo Min-ho	Cameo	
2016	Entourage	Cha Joon		
2016–2017	The Sound of Your Heart	Jo Suk		
2016–2017	Hwarang: The Poet Warrior Youth	Mak-moon	Cameo (episode 1–3)	
2017	Hit the Top	Yoon-ki	Cameo (episode 2)	
2018	Live	Yeom Sang-soo		
2022	The Killer's Shopping List	Ahn Dae-sung		
2024	No Way Out: The Roulette	Yoon Chang-jae		
2025	The Divorce Insurance	Ahn Jeon-man		
2025	Karma	Han Sang-hun		
TBA	Hero			

=== Web series ===
Year	Title	Role	Notes	Ref.
2022	X of Crisis	The man	Special appearance	
2025	The Manipulated	Baek Do-kyung		

=== Television shows ===
Year	Title	Role	Notes	Ref.
2010–2021	Running Man	Cast member	Episode 1–559	
2015	Perhaps Love	Cast member	with Lynn Hung	
2021	House on Wheels: For Rent	Cast member	with The Pirates: The Last Royal Treasure actors	
2023	GBRB: Reap What You Sow	Cast member	with Kim Ki-bang, Kim Woo-bin and Doh Kyung-soo	
2026	Yoo Jae-suk's Camp	Main Cast	with Yoo Jae-suk and Byeon Woo-seok	

=== Web shows ===
Year	Title	Role	Notes	Ref.
2018–2021	Busted!	Cast member	Season 1 and 3	
2022–2023	The Zone: Survival Mission	Cast member	Season 1–2	
2022	Korea No. 1	Cast member	with Yoo Jae-suk and Kim Yeon-koung	

=== Music video appearances ===
Year	Song title	Artist	Ref.
2011	"격산타우 (Kyuksantawoo)"	LeeSsang	
2012	"Oh Fresh Men" (The Bachelor's Vegetable Store OST)	VF6DOLE (with Ji Chang-wook, Kim Young-kwang, Shin Won-ho and Sung Ha)	
2012	"Busan Vacance"	Skull and HaHa	
2013	"You Are the Best" teaser	Byul	
2013	"Runaway"	KARA	
2015	"Again"	Turbo	
2016	"MOMOMO"	Cosmic Girls	
2021	"GAP"	HaHa	

== Discography ==
Title	Year	Album
"Oh-Sing-Sing-Men Oh Sing Sing Men" (with Ji Chang-wook, Lee Kwang-soo, Kim Young-kwang, Shin Won-ho, Sung-je, and Ji-hyuk)	2011	Bachelor's Vegetable Store OST - Japanese release
"Pink Nose Light (핑코빛)" (with Lee Kwang-soo, Ji Suk-jin and Apink)	2019	Running Man Fan Meeting: Project Running 9
"I Like It" (with Running Man cast members)	2019	Running Man Fan Meeting: Project Running 9

== Ambassadorship ==
- Korea-Mekong Ambassador (2021)

== Accolades ==
=== Awards and nominations ===
Name of the award ceremony, year presented, category, nominee of the award, and the result of the nomination
Award ceremony	Year	Category	Nominee / Work	Result	Ref.
APAN Star Awards	2014	Popular Star Award, Actor	It's Okay, That's Love	Won	
Asia Artist Awards	2019	Scene Stealer Award	Lee Kwang-soo	Won	
Asia Artist Awards	2019	Best K-Culture (Actor)	Lee Kwang-soo	Won	
Asia Contents Awards & Global OTT Awards	2024	Best Supporting Actor	Lee Kwang-soo	Nominated	
Asia Model Awards	2009	CF Model Award	Lee Kwang-soo	Won	
Baeksang Arts Awards	2012	Best New Actor – Film	Wonderful Radio	Nominated	
Baeksang Arts Awards	2020	Best Supporting Actor – Film	Inseparable Bros	Won	
Blue Dragon Film Awards	2012	Best New Actor	All About My Wife	Nominated	
Blue Dragon Film Awards	2019	Best Supporting Actor	Inseparable Bros	Nominated	
Blue Dragon Film Awards	2019	Popular Star Award	Inseparable Bros	Won	
Blue Dragon Film Awards	2021	Best Supporting Actor	Sinkhole	Nominated	
Blue Dragon Series Awards	2023	Best Male Entertainer	The Zone: Survival Mission	Nominated	
Blue Dragon Series Awards	2023	TIRTIR Popularity Award	The Zone: Survival Mission	Won	
Blue Dragon Series Awards	2025	Best Supporting Actor	Karma	Won	
Blue Dragon Series Awards	2026	Best Supporting Actor	Gold Land	Nominated	
Fashionista Awards	2015	Best Male Fashionista	Lee Kwang-soo	Won	
Golden Cinematography Awards	2021	Best Supporting Actor	Inseparable Bros	Won	
Hong Kong's YouTube Ads Leaderboard	2015	2015 Season One Best Commercial Award	Nestle's Fruitips Ad	Won	
Jumei Awards Ceremony	2016	Variety Influence	Lee Kwang-soo	Won	
KBS Drama Awards	2012	Best Supporting Actor	The Innocent Man	Nominated	
KBS Entertainment Awards	2016	Hot Issue Variety Award	The Sound of Your Heart	Won	
KBS Entertainment Awards	2016	Best Couple Award	Lee Kwang-soo (with Jung So-min); The Sound of Your Heart	Won	
Korea Best Star Awards	2018	Best Popular Star Award	The Accidental Detective 2: In Action	Won	
Korea Drama Awards	2014	Excellence Award, Actor	It's Okay, That's Love	Won	
Korea First Brand Awards	2026	Film Actor (Vietnam)	Lee Kwang-soo	Won	
MBC Entertainment Awards	2008	Best Newcomer in Comedy / Sitcom	Here He Comes	Nominated	
Mnet 20's Choice Awards	2008	Hot CF Star	Lee Kwang-soo	Won	
SBS Drama Awards	2014	Special Award, Actor in a Miniseries	It's Okay, That's Love	Won	
SBS Entertainment Awards	2010	New Star Award	Running Man	Won	
SBS Entertainment Awards	2011	Best Newcomer in Variety	Running Man	Won	
SBS Entertainment Awards	2011	Netizen Popularity Award	Running Man	Nominated	
SBS Entertainment Awards	2013	Friendship Award	Running Man	Won	
SBS Entertainment Awards	2013	Viewer's Most Popular Award	Lee Kwang-soo (with Running Man members)	Won	
SBS Entertainment Awards	2013	Best Couple Award	Lee Kwang-soo (with Ji Suk-jin); Running Man	Nominated	
SBS Entertainment Awards	2014	Excellence Award in Variety	Running Man	Won	
SBS Entertainment Awards	2016	Top Excellence Award in Variety Show	Running Man	Won	
SBS Entertainment Awards	2016	Annoying Guy Award	Running Man	Won	
SBS Entertainment Awards	2017	Best Couple Award	Lee Kwang-soo (with Jeon So-min); Running Man	Won	
SBS Entertainment Awards	2017	Global Star Award	Lee Kwang-soo (with Running Man members)	Won	
SBS Entertainment Awards	2018	Popularity Award	Running Man	Won	
SBS Entertainment Awards	2018	Best Couple Award	Lee Kwang-soo (with Jeon So-min); Running Man	Nominated	
SBS Entertainment Awards	2019	SNS Star Award	Running Man	Won	
SBS Entertainment Awards	2020	Golden Content Award	Lee Kwang-soo (with Running Man members)	Won	
Star Night - Korea Top Star Awards Ceremony	2017	Top Entertainer Award	Lee Kwang-soo	Won	
Sina Weibo Night Awards	2016	Asia Popularity Award	Lee Kwang-soo	Won	

=== State honors ===
Name of country, year given, and name of honor
Country or Organization	Year	Honor or Award	Ref.
South Korea (Note: Honors are given at the Korean Popular Culture and Arts Awards, arranged by the Korea Creative Content Agency and hosted by the Ministry of Culture, Sports and Tourism. They are awarded to those who have contributed to the arts and South Korea's pop culture.)	2016	Prime Minister's Commendation	

=== Listicles ===
Name of publisher, year listed, name of listicle, and placement
Publisher	Year	Listicle	Placement	Ref.
Forbes	2013	Korea Power Celebrity 40	39th	
Forbes	2016	Korea Power Celebrity 40	30th	
Korean Film Council	2021	Korean Actors 200 (Note: Introduces 200 actors that best represent the present and future of Korean cinema to the people in the film industry all over the world.)	Included	
