= Han Jae-suk =

South Korean actor (born 1973)

- Born: Han Sang-woo; August 12, 1973 (age 53); Seoul, South Korea
- Education: Yonsei University - Physical Education
- Occupation: Actor
- Years active: 1994–present
- Agent: FN Entertainment
- Spouse: Park Sol-mi (m. 2013)
- Children: 2

Korean name
- Hangul: 한상우
- Hanja: 韓尚宇
- RR: Han Sangu
- MR: Han Sangu

Stage name
- Hangul: 한재석
- Hanja: 韓載錫
- RR: Han Jaeseok
- MR: Han Chaesŏk

Han Jae-suk (Korean: 한재석; born August 12, 1973), born Han Sang-woo (한상우) is a South Korean actor. He has starred in several television series, notably All About Eve (2000), Four Sisters (2001), Glass Slippers (2002), The Great Ambition (Daemang, 2002), Women of the Sun (2008), and The Great Merchant (2010). Han has also ventured into the Chinese-language market, getting cast opposite Ruby Lin in Amor de Tarapaca (2004) and Cecilia Cheung in Speed Angels (2011).

== Personal life ==
Han began dating actress Park Sol-mi after they worked together on The Great Merchant in 2010. They wed at Aston House, Sheraton Grande Walkerhill Hotel in Seoul on April 21, 2013. Park's agency announced in September 2013 that the couple is expecting their first child. On March 23, 2014, she gave birth to their daughter.

== Controversy ==
=== Draft-dodging scandal investigation ===
In 2004, Han became involved in a draft-dodging scandal after investigations revealed that he and fellow actors Song Seung-heon and Jang Hyuk paid a broker ₩200-300 million to help them fail the medical exam and avoid mandatory military service. Amid widespread public condemnation, their exemptions were reversed and they enlisted that year, then were eventually discharged in 2006.

== Filmography ==
=== Film ===
Year	Title	Role
1996	Seven Reasons Why Beer Is Better Than a Lover	
1996	Unfix	
1999	Love Wind Love Song	Movie star (cameo)
2010	The Quiz Show Scandal	Park Sang-gil
2011	Romantic Heaven	Stalker (cameo)
2011	Hit	Baji
2011	Speed Angels	Gao Feng
2013	Our Heaven	
2017	One Step	Ji-il

=== Television series ===
Year	Title	Role	Ref.
1994	Feelings		
1994	Last Lovers		
1995	Jazz		
1996	Oxtail Soup		
1997	Model	Jo Won-joon	
1998	Fascinate My Heart	Seo Ki-jo	
1998	Purity	Kang Hyun-suk	
1998	Sunflower	Dr. Kwon In-chan	
1999	Roses and Bean Sprouts	Choi Soon-dae	
1999	Should My Tears Show	Yoo Jong-soo	
2000	All About Eve	Kim Woo-jin	
2001	Four Sisters	Lee Young-hoon	
2002	Glass Slippers	Jang Jae-hyuk	
2002	The Great Ambition	Park Si-young	
2004	Amor de Tarapaca	Zhao Yan Zu	
2007	Lobbyist	Kang Tae-hyuk	
2008	Women in the Sun	Kim Joon-se	
2010	The Great Merchant	Jung Hong-soo	
2012	Immortal Classic	Kim Sung-joon	
2012	Ohlala Couple	Jang Hyun-woo	
2014	A Witch's Love	Noh Shi-hoon	
2019	Joseon Survival Period	Yun Won-hyeong	
2024	Check-in Hanyang		
2025	Heroes Next Door	Lee Geun-cheol	

== Awards and nominations ==
Year	Award	Category	Nominated work	Result
2002	SBS Drama Awards	Excellence Award, Actor in a Special Planning Drama	The Great Ambition	Won
2002	SBS Drama Awards	Top 10 Stars	The Great Ambition, Glass Slippers	Won
2008	KBS Drama Awards	Excellence Award, Actor in a Miniseries	Women of the Sun	Nominated
2010	KBS Drama Awards	Excellence Award, Actor in a Serial Drama	The Great Merchant	Nominated
