= Hwabin Yun =

Joseon royal consort (1765–1824)

- Royal Consort of the Senior First Rank
- Born: 19 May 1765; Joseon
- Died: 1 February 1824 (aged 58); Hanseong, Joseon
- Burial: Hwabinmyo, Seosamneung Cluster, Goyang, South Korea
- Consort of: Jeongjo of Joseon
Names
- Title: Lady Gyeongsu (경수궁; 慶壽宮; Gyeongsugung; lit. ''Gyeongsu Palace'')
- Clan: Namwon Yun (by birth); Jeonju Yi (by marriage)
- Dynasty: Yi
- Father: Yun Chang-yun
- Mother: Lady, of the Byeokjin Yi clan

Korean name
- Hangul: 화빈 윤씨
- Hanja: 和嬪 尹氏
- RR: Hwabin Yunssi
- MR: Hwabin Yunssi

Hwabin Yun (Korean: 화빈 윤씨; Hanja: 和嬪 尹氏; 19 May 1765 – 1 February 1824), or Concubine Hwa, (Note: The literal translation of bin (빈; 嬪) is "concubine". Combined with the honorific title hwa (화; 和), the full meaning is "Harmonious Concubine".) of the Namwon Yun clan, also known as Lady Gyeongsu, was a consort of Jeongjo of Joseon.

== Biography ==
=== Early life ===
Lady Yun was born into the Namwon Yun clan, as the only child of Yun Chang-yun and his wife, a lady from the Byeokjin Yi clan.

=== Royal consort ===
In early 1780, Queen Dowager Yesun announced the selection of a new concubine for her legal grandson, King Jeongjo, because his wife, Queen Hyoui, couldn't bear children and his first concubine, Concubine Won, had died one year prior. The selection was initially set to accept candidates aged 16 to 18, but due to the very low number of applicants, the range was expanded to include those aged 15 to 19.

On 14 April 1780, shortly before her 15th birthday, Lady Yun was appointed as a royal consort of the senior first rank (빈; 嬪; bin), with the honorific title hwa (화; 和), meaning "harmony".

In the Veritable Records of the Joseon Dynasty, it's stated that she conceived in 1781 but her pregnancy was an imaginary one.

Lady Yun died without issue in 1824, during Sunjo's reign. She was buried in Goyang, Gyeonggi Province.

== Family ==
- Father: Yun Chang-yun (판관 윤창윤; 尹昌胤)
- Mother: Lady, of the Byeokjin Yi clan (벽진 이씨; 碧珍 李氏)
  - Grandfather: Yi Hun-bo (이훈보)
  - Grandmother: Lady Kim (김씨)
- Husband
  - Jeongjo of Joseon (조선 정조; 朝鮮 正祖; 28 October 1752 – 18 August 1800)

== Legacy ==
- Blue flower white porcelain (백자청화 칠보화훼문 사각병) – Seoul Tangible Cultural Property No. 402
- A book which was written by Lady Yun about setting the etiquette rules to be followed by her retainers

== In popular culture ==
- Portrayed by Yoo Yeon-ji in the 2007 MBC TV series Lee San, Wind of the Palace.
- Portrayed by Yi Seo-in the 2021 MBC TV series The Red Sleeve.
