= Kim Jo-sun (politician) =

Korean politician (1765–1832)

Kim Jo-sun 김조순 Internal Prince Yeongan
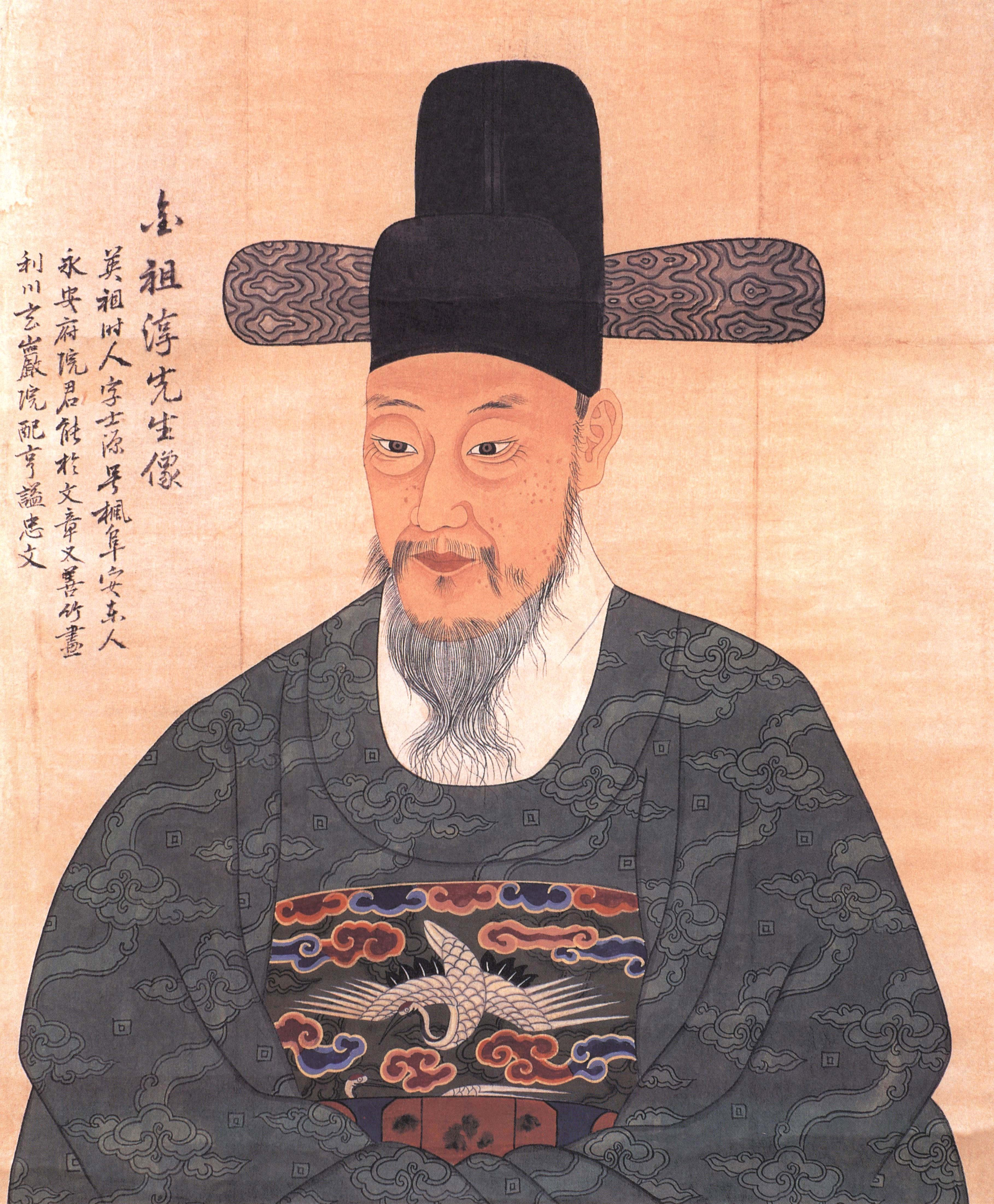
- Portrayal of Kim Jo-sun in his declining age (1832)

Chief State Councilor of Joseon
- In office 31 January 1800 – 9 January 1811
- Appointed by: Jeongjo of Joseon; Sunjo of Joseon

Regent of Joseon
- In office December 1803 – March 1804
- Monarch: Sunjo of Joseon

Personal details
- Born: Kim Jo-sun; 1765 Joseon
- Died: 1832 (aged about 66) Hanseong, Joseon
- Spouse: Internal Princess Consort Cheongyang of the Cheongsong Shim clan
- Children: 4 sons and 4 daughters, including Queen Sunwon and Kim Jwa-geun
- Parents: Kim Yi-jung (father); Lady Shin of the Pyeongsan Shin clan (mother)

- Korean name
- Hangul: 김조순
- Hanja: 金祖淳
- RR: Gim Josun
- MR: Kim Chosun

Art name
- Hangul: 풍고
- Hanja: 楓皐
- RR: Punggo
- MR: P'unggo

Courtesy name
- Hangul: 사원
- Hanja: 士源
- RR: Sawon
- MR: Sawŏn

Posthumous name
- Hangul: 충문
- Hanja: 忠文
- RR: Chungmun
- MR: Ch'ungmun

Kim Jo-sun (Korean: 김조순; Hanja: 金祖淳; 1765–1832) was a Korean political figure during the late Joseon period. He came from the (new) Andong Kim clan (신 안동 김씨; 新 安東 金氏). He served as a minister in the royal court and orchestrated the Andong Kim clan's takeover of power. He was the father of Queen Sunwon. After his daughter became the Queen Consort, his son-in-law, Sunjo of Joseon, honored him as the Internal Prince Yeongan (영안 부원군; 永安 府院君).

== Political influence ==
After Queen Jeongsun stepped down as regent, Kim Jo-sun, already held an influential court member, purged his political rivals to help secure the position of his family and political faction. This began the era of Sedo politics, or oligarchic rule, of the Andong Kim clan. Kim was a leading member of the Noron Faction. This marked the beginning of a sixty-year period, spanning the reign of three kings (Sunjo, Heonjong, and Cheoljong), in which the real power in the country was wielded by the Andong Kims.

Kim Jo-sun acted as regent for Sunjo, with the reins of power firmly in his grip. Local magistrates and provincial governors alike had to curry favor with the Andong Kim clan to maintain their positions. Kim Jo-sun's son, Kim Jwa-geun, took over the Andong Kim clan as it was attaining the height of its influence.

== Family ==
- Father
  - Kim Yi-jung (김이중; 金履中)
- Mother
  - Lady Shin of the Pyeongsan Shin clan (평산 신씨)
- Wife
  - Internal Princess Consort Cheongyang of the Cheongsong Shim clan (청양부부인 청송 심씨; 靑陽府夫人 靑松沈氏; 1766 –1828)
- Children
  - Son: Kim Yu-geun (김유근; 金逌根; March 1785 – July 1840); became the adoptive son of Kim Yong-sun (김용순; 金龍淳)
  - Son: Kim Won-geun (김원근; 金元根; 1786–1832)
  - Daughter: Queen Sunwon of the Andong Kim clan (순원왕후 김씨; 8 June 1789 – 21 September 1857)
    - Son-in-law: King Sunjo of Joseon (순조대왕; 純祖大王; 29 July 1790 – 13 December 1834)
      - Grandson: Yi Yeong, Crown Prince Hyomyeong (효명세자; 孝明世子; 18 September 1809 – 25 June 1830)
      - Granddaughter: Princess Myeongon (명온공주; 1810–1832)
      - Granddaughter: Princess Bokon (복온공주; 24 November 1818 – 10 June 1832)
      - Unnamed grandson (1820–1820)
      - Granddaughter: Princess Deokon (덕온공주; 1822–1844)
      - Adoptive grandson: King Cheoljong of Joseon (25 July 1831 – 16 January 1864)
  - Son: Kim Jwa-geun (김좌근; 金左根; 1797 – 5 June 1869)
  - Daughter: Lady Kim of the Andong Kim clan (신 안동 김씨; 新 安東 金氏)
  - Daughter: Lady Kim of the Andong Kim clan (신 안동 김씨; 新 安東 金氏)
  - Daughter: Lady Kim of the Andong Kim clan (신 안동 김씨; 新 安東 金氏)
  - Son: Kim Son-geun (김손근; 金遜根)

== Books ==
- Punggomunjib (풍고문집)
- Odaegeomhyeopjeon (오대검협전)
