= Kim Chwagŭn =

Joseon scholar-official (1797–1869)

Kim Chwagŭn 김좌근

Chief State Councillor
- In office 20 October 1863 – 23 May 1864
- Preceded by: Jeong Won-yong
- Succeeded by: Cho Doo-sun
- In office 3 April 1853 – 14 February 1859
- Preceded by: Kim Heung-geun
- Succeeded by: Jeong Won-yong

Right State Councillor
- In office 13 June 1852 – 3 April 1853
- Preceded by: Yi Heon-gu
- Succeeded by: Cho Doo-sun

Personal details
- Born: 1797
- Died: 5 June 1869 (aged 71–72)
- Parents: Kim Jo-sun, Internal Prince Yeongan (father); Internal Princess Consort Cheongyang of the Cheongsong Shim clan (mother)

Kim Chwagŭn (Korean: 김좌근; Hanja: 金左根; 1797 – 5 June 1869) was a Korean political figure from the Andong Kim clan, who held a number of high-ranking government positions in the late Joseon period, including Chief State Councillor at King Cheoljong's court. He was the younger brother of Queen Sunwon.

== Biography ==
Kim Chwagŭn was born in 1797, as a member of the Andong Kim clan (신 안동 김씨; 新 安東 金氏). His father was Kim Jo-sun and his mother was Lady Shim of Cheongsong. He was the fourth child of seven children.

In 1802, his older sister became the Queen of Joseon at the age of 13, when she married King Sunjo during his second year of reign.

In 1825, at the recommendation of his father, Kim served as a vice-deputy of Mupomgwanik, and in 1834 was promoted to the position of Cheomjong. In the second year of King Cheoljong's reign, he was appointed to several important positions. On February 25, 1853, he was appointed as Chief State Councillor, and though he attempted to resign, he was not allowed to until April 19, 1862. However, in September 1863, he was ordered to "return as chief minister". In 1862, he served as governor while Lee Jeong-cheong was trying to quell the Imsul Peasant Revolt, which was arising from the disturbance of Samjeong.

Until her death, on September 21, 1857, his older sister, Queen Sunwon, who has served as Queen Regent two times, had given immense political influence to the Andong Kim clan, which was the central figure in politics up until 1863 to 1864, when Heungseon Daewongun, with the help of Queen Sinjeong, stepped in during the regency of his son, King Gojong. When Gojong became King and Heungseon Daewongun came to power, Kim Jwa-geun withdrew from the position of Chief State Councillor, but continued to participate in government affairs. Together with his adoptive son, Kim Byeong-gi, he helped Heungseon Daewongun in his regency, since he had difficulty in maintaining the affairs of the state as he came from a distant royal line.

When he died in 1869, he was given the posthumous title of Chungik (충익; 忠翼).

In 1990, the descendants of his adopted son donated the house where Kim Jwa-geun and his family had lived to the Seoul National University.

== Family ==
- Father
  - Kim Jo-sun, Internal Prince Yeongan (김조순 영안부원군; 金祖淳 永安府院君; 1765–1832)
- Mother
  - Internal Princess Consort Cheongyang of the Cheongsong Shim clan (청양부부인 심씨; 靑陽府夫人 沈氏; 1766–1828)
- Siblings:
  - Older brother: Kim Yu-geun (김유근; 金逌根; March 1785 – July 1840); became the adoptive son of Kim Yong-sun (김용순; 金龍淳)
  - Older brother: Kim Won-geun (김원근; 金元根; 1786–1832)
  - Older sister: Queen Sunwon of the Andong Kim clan (순원왕후 김씨; 8 June 1789 – 21 September 1857)
    - Brother-in-law: King Sunjo of Joseon (순조대왕; 純祖大王; 29 July 1790 – 13 December 1834)
  - Older sister: Lady Kim of the Andong Kim clan (1792–?)
  - Older sister: Lady Kim of the Andong Kim clan (1794–?)
  - Older sister: Lady Kim of the Andong Kim clan (1795–?)
- Wives and children:
  - Lady Yun (정경부인 윤씨; 貞敬夫人 尹氏; 1795–1858)
    - Adoptive son: Kim Byeong-gi (김병기; 金炳冀; 1818–1875); son of Kim Yeong-geun (김영근; 金泳根; 1793–1870)
  - Concubine: Lady Naju of the Yang clan (나주부인 양씨; 羅州夫人 梁氏)

== In popular culture ==
=== Drama ===
- Portrayed by Lee Sun-jae in the 1975 TBC TV series The King's First Love
- Portrayed by Jang Min-ho in the 1982 KBS1 TV series Wind and Cloud
- Portrayed by Kim Seong-won in the 1989 KBS2 TV series Wind, Clouds, and Rain
- Portrayed by Jeong Ok in the 1990 MBC TV series 500 Years of Joseon: Daewongun
- Portrayed by Song Jae-ho in the 2001 KBS TV series Empress Myeongseong
- Portrayed by Choi Jong-won in the 2014 KBS2 TV series Gunman in Joseon
- Portrayed by Cha Gwang-su in the 2020 TV Chosun TV series Kingmaker: The Change of Destiny
- Portrayed by Kim Tae-woo in the 2020 TVN TV series Mr. Queen

=== Film ===
- Portrayed by Nam Gyeong-eup in the 2016 film The Map Against the World
- Portrayed by Park Yoon-sik in the 2018 film Fengshui
