= Princess Myeongon =

Korean princess (1810–1832)

Princess Myeongon 명온공주
- Born: 1810; Hanseong, Joseon
- Died: 1832 (aged 20–21); Joseon
- Burial: San 84-2, Gyomun-dong, Guri, Gyeonggi Province
- Spouse: Kim Hyeon-geun, Prince Consort Dongnyeong (m.1823–1832)
- Issue: Unnamed child; Unnamed child; Kim Byeong-sam (adopted son)
- House: Jeonju Yi (by birth) Andong Kim (by marriage)
- Father: Sunjo of Joseon
- Mother: Queen Sunwon of the Andong Kim clan

Princess Myeongon (Korean: 명온공주; Hanja: 明溫公主; 1810–1832) was a Joseon princess, as the eldest daughter of King Sunjo and Queen Sunwon of the Andong Kim clan.

== Biography ==
She was born in 1810, as the eldest daughter and second child of Sunjo of Joseon and Queen Sunwon of the Andong Kim clan.

On May 11, 1817, at the age of 8 years old, she was granted the title of Princess Myeongon (명온공주; 明溫公主).

On May 10, 1823, a selection to choose her husband took place nationwide. Only boys between 12 and 15 years old could participate and the winner was Kim Hyeon-geun (김현근), the son of Kim Han-sun (김한순) from the Andong Kim clan. They were married on July 20, that same year, and Kim was granted the title of Prince Consort Dongnyeong (동녕위). The Princess had become pregnant twice but had lost the babies in unknown years. A son from her husband's clan was eventually adopted.

The Princess died around the age of 20 to 21, in 1832, after a long struggle with illness.

== Family ==
- Father: Sunjo of Joseon (조선 순조왕; 29 July 1790 – 13 December 1834)
- Mother: Queen Sunwon of the Andong Kim clan (순원왕후 김씨; 8 June 1789 – 21 September 1857)

Sibling(s):

- Older brother: Yi Yeong, Crown Prince Hyomyeong (이영 효명세자; 18 September 1809 – 25 June 1830)
- Younger sister: Princess Bokon (복온공주; 26 October 1818 – 12 May 1832)
- Younger sister: Princess Deokon (덕온공주; 10 June 1822 – 24 May 1844)

Consort:

- Kim Hyeon-geun, Prince Consort Dongnyeong (김현근 동녕위; 金賢根 東寧尉; 1810–1868)

Issue:

- Unnamed child; died prematurely (Note: According to the epitaph of Princess Myeong-on written by Hong Seok-ju, it is recorded that she became pregnant twice but lost both early.)
- Unnamed child; died prematurely
- Adoptive son: Kim Byeong-sam (김병삼; 1831–1910); son of Kim Tae-gyun (김태근; 1778–1832)

== In popular culture ==
- Portrayed by Jung Hye-sung in the 2016 KBS2 TV series Love in the Moonlight.
