= Kim Gwi-joo =

Korean scholar

Kim Gwi-ju (Korean: 김귀주; Hanja: 金龜柱; 1740–1786) was a Korean scholar, politician and the leader of the No-ron Faction. He was a high-ranking minister of the royal court and holds the title of Lord Kim and Internal Prince Kim. Kim was the older brother of Queen Jeongsun. He plotted to kill Crown Prince Yi San (Jeongjo) alongside Princess Hwawan (who he saw as a rival to his sister in the No-Ron faction). After his participation in the plots is discovered, Lord Kim is stripped of his titles and exiled.

== In popular culture ==
- Portrayed by Park Young-ji in the 2007 MBC TV series Lee San, Wind of the Palace.
