= Kim Jo-sun =

Kim Jo-sun may refer to:

- Kim Jo-sun (archer)
- Kim Jo-sun (politician)
