= Dongmyeong ilgi =

Dongmyeong ilgi (동명일기, Travelogue of Dongmyeong) is a travelogue and miscellany written by Lady Uiyudang (意幽堂) of the Nam clan of Uiryeong (宜寧南氏, 1727–1823) in 1772 (the 48th regnal year of Yeongjo of Joseon), at the age of 46. Written while she was staying in the Hamheung region as the wife of an assistant magistrate of the same region, it depicts her trip to a beach near Hamheung known as Dongmyeong (東溟) and her experience of watching a moonrise and a sunrise there. This travelogue appears in Uiyudang gwanbuk yuram ilgi (의유당관북유람일기 The Diary of Uiyudang's Journey to the Gwanbuk Region), which she wrote after travelling around the Hamheung region.

== Authorship ==
Uiyudang's mother was the daughter of Yeo Pil-yong (呂必容), and her father was Nam Jik-gwan (南直寬), the son of Nam Do-gyu (南道揆) who served as daesagwan (chief historiographer), a high-ranking official, during the reign of King Sukjong. Uiyudang was also the wife of Sin Dae-son (申大孫, 1728–1788), the 8th lineal descendant of General Sin Rip (申砬). Moreover, The sister of Uiyudang's husband married Hong In-han (洪麟漢), the uncle of Lady Hyegyeonggung Hong (later Queen Heongyeong), and her elder sister's husband was Kim Si-muk (金時默), the father of Queen Hyoui, the wife of King Jeongju. As such, Uiyudang was from the most prestigious family at the time.

According to her another work Uiyudangyugo (의유당유고 The Posthumous Writings of Uiyudang), she lost all but one of her 12 children. It seems that when she was younger, she followed her husband to northern and southern regions of Korea, but led a lonely life after her husband and most of her children had died. While she was spending her later years in Samcheong-dong, Seoul, her niece Queen Hyoui took care of her, regularly sending her food and clothing.

Uiyundang's major literary works are Uiyudang gwanbuk yuram ilgi and Uiyudangyugo. In addition to Dongmyeong ilgi, Uiyudang gwanbuk yuram ilgi contains "Nangminu" (낙민루 Nangminu Pavilion), a travelogue of the Nangminu Pavilion, a well-known attraction in the Hamheungbu region; "Buksannu" (북산루 Buksannu Pavilion), a travelogue of the Buksannu and Seomunnu Pavilions; "Chunilsoheung" (춘일소흥 A Little Joy on A Spring Day), a Korean-script collection of other people's anecdotes; and her Korean translation of "Yeongmyeongsa deugwollu sangnyangmun" (영명사득월루상량문 The Foundation Story of Deugwollu Pavilion at Yeongmyeongsa Temple). Among these literary works, "Chunilsoheung" and "Yeongmyeongsa deugwollu sangnyangmun" are not either her original stories or related to her travel around the Gwanbuk region, but since they are part of the Uiyudang gwanbuk yuram ilgi, they are presumed to be her own translations. On the other hand, Uiyudangyugo contains three Chinese-script essays, including "Baengnyeonbongseo" (백년봉서 A Writing on Baengnyeonbong Peak); 17 Chinese poems, including "Chungyeong" (춘경 A Scenery on a Spring Day); and three Korean-script essays, including Gieoyuson (기어유손 My Story of Living with a Young Grandson).

== Plot ==
In 1769, Uiyudang moves to Hamheung with her husband after his appointment as an official in the region. She is told that the moonrise and sunrise in Dongmyeong are worth seeing, but is unable to watch them due to her husband's objection and the fact that Dongmyeong is 50 ri away from Hamheung. Two years later, she receives permission from her husband and visits Dongmyeong. However, when she climbs up to the Gwigyeongdae Cliff (龜景臺), she is unable to see a sunrise due to a cloudy weather.

Uiyudang begs her husband again, and in 1772, accompanied by her husband, woman entertainers, and servants, she takes a trip to Dongmyeong once again to see a moonrise and a sunrise. After arriving at her destination, she first enjoys boating, and then when the dusk is falling, she climbs up to the Gwigyeongdae Cliff. There, waiting for a moonrise, she enjoys listening to "Gwandong byeolgok" (Song of Gwandong) sung by a woman entertainer before finally watching a moonrise.

After staying up all night to see a sunrise, Uiyudang climbs up to the Gwigyeongdae Cliff once again and waits for it. However, women entertainers feel sorry for her, thinking that she won't be able to see a sunrise due to a cloudy weather. Uiyudang is also worried about it, but the sun looms above the horizon, and she describes the scene in great detail. After having breakfast, she tours around the Bongung House, the former residence of King Taejo of Joseon. She expresses gratitude for royal blessings and dedicates a piece of writing.

== Features and Significance ==
Uiyudang gwanbuk yuram ilgi is significant in that it is a unique travelogue of the Gwanbuk region, the northern border area of Joseon, written by a Joseon noblewoman who was barely allowed to leave home. In this regard, it is comparable with gihaeng gasa (prose poetry on travel) written by noblewomen.

Dongmyeong ilgi, in particular, is considered an essay masterpiece as it provides a detailed observation of the emotions and behavior of people waiting for a sunrise, while illustrating the awe of this natural phenomenon with fresh words and dramatic expressions.

== Other ==
Considered a masterly Korean-script essay featuring aesthetic descriptions, Dongmyeong ilgi has been appearing in high school Korean language and literature textbooks.

== Text ==
Uiyudang gwanbuk yuram ilgi was rediscovered by Garam Lee Byeong-gi in the 20th century. The title of this travelogue appears in the Yeongyeongdang eonmunchaek mongnok (연경당언문책목록 The List of Korean-Script Books Housed at Yeongyeongdang Residence), indicating that the book was part of the royal collection of the Joseon Dynasty. The original manuscript of the book has not survived to the present day. However, a printed edition created by Garam Lee Byeong-gi and a printed copy appearing in Joseon yeokdae yeoryu munjim (조선역대여류문집 A Collection of Writings by Joseon Women) are available today.
