= Queen Sunwon =

Queen of Joseon from 1802 to 1834

Queen Sunwon 순원왕후

Grand queen dowager of Joseon
- Tenure: 18 December 1834 – 21 September 1857
- Predecessor: Grand Queen Dowager Yesun
- Successor: Grand Queen Dowager Hyoyu

Queen regent of Joseon
- Regency: 18 December 1834 – January 1841; 25 July 1849 – January 1852
- Predecessor: Queen Jeongsun
- Successor: Queen Sinjeong
- Monarchs: King Heonjong of Joseon; King Cheoljong of Joseon

Queen dowager of Joseon
- Tenure: 14 December 1834 – 18 December 1834
- Predecessor: Queen Dowager Kim
- Successor: Queen Dowager Hyoyu

Queen consort of Joseon
- Tenure: 1802 – 14 December 1834
- Predecessor: Queen Hyoui
- Successor: Queen Hyohyeon
- Born: 8 June 1789; Joseon
- Died: 21 September 1857 (aged 68); Yangsimhab, Changdeokgung, Joseon
- Burial: Inreung
- Spouse: King Sunjo of Joseon (m. 1802–1834)
- Issue: 1. Crown Prince Hyomyeong; 2. Princess Myeongon; 3. Princess Bokon; 4. An unnamed prince 5. Princess Deokon; 6. Cheoljong of Joseon (adopted)
Posthumous name
- 명경문인광성융희정렬선휘영덕자헌현륜홍화신운수목예성홍정순원왕후
- House: Andong Kim
- Father: Kim Jo-sun
- Mother: Internal Princess Consort Cheongyang of the Cheongsong Sim clan

Queen Sunwon (Korean: 순원왕후; 8 June 1789 – 21 September 1857), of the Andong Kim clan was the queen consort and wife of Sunjo of Joseon. She was known as Queen Dowager Myeonggyeong (명경왕대비) after her husband's death in 1834. She served as regent between 1834 and 1841 during her grandson, Heonjong of Joseon's reign, and in 1849–1852 during her adoptive son, Cheoljong of Joseon's reign. She was posthumously called as Sunwon, the Respectful Empress (순원숙황후; 純元肅皇后).

== Biography ==
=== Early life ===
The future Queen Consort was born into the Andong Kim clan on 8 June 1789. She was the eldest daughter and third child of Kim Jo-sun and his wife, Lady Sim of the Cheongsong Sim clan. Through her father, Lady Kim was a 5th great-grandniece of Queen Inmok, the second wife of King Seonjo and mother of Princess Jeongmyeong. She was also a first cousin twice removed of Princess Jeongmyeong through her paternal grandmother, Lady Shin.

Her mother's side was already connected to the royal family since her maternal grandfather, Sim Geon-ji, was a 5th cousin of Sim Neung-geon (심능건, 沈能建; 1752 – 7 July 1817); who was the son-in-law of Yeongjo of Joseon as he was married to his daughter, Princess Hwaryeong. Sim Geon-ji was also close to Sim Hwan-ji (심환지, 沈煥之; 1730 – 18 October 1802); who was a member of the Noron Byeokpa faction. Because of this, Sim Hwan-ji was able to interfere with the final selection of who could become Queen Consort.

As Lady Kim was from the Andong Kim clan, which was under the leadership of her father Kim Jo-sun, who was also a member of the Noron faction and served as Jeongjo of Joseon's closest aide, Lady Kim emerged as a powerful soon-to-be queen when she was selected among the young girls.

=== Queen consort ===
In 1802 at the age of 13, Lady Kim married King Sunjo and became the Queen of Joseon. The Queen eventually bore 5 children; Hyomyeong in 1809, Princess Myeongon in 1810, Princess Bokon in 1818, and Princess Deokon in 1828—with only one son dying in infancy in 1820.

=== Regent ===
When her husband died in 1834, she became regent for her eight-year-old grandson, King Heonjong and the political power remained in the hands of her family, the Andong Kim clan until 1840, when it passed to the family of Heonjong's mother, Queen Sinjeong, the Pungyang Jo clan, following the Catholic persecution of 1839.

Prior to the death of her grandson in 1849 and becoming regent once again, the Queen had outlived her children as one of her remaining daughters, Princess Deokon, died in 1844. The Queen eventually became regent again during King Cheoljong's reign in 1849. With her influence, she had the king marry a daughter from her clan in 1851, who was known as Queen Cheorin, and ruled as regent until his fourth year of reign in 1852.

=== Death ===
Queen Sunwon later died in Changdeokgung, on 21 September 1857. The Queen's clan power later diminished when Queen Shinjeong adopted Grand Internal Prince Heungseon's son, Yi Myeong-bok, as her own to become the next king. The Queen Dowager stepped down and gave all power to the Grand Internal Prince Heungseon to help his son as regent; thus removing all power of the Andong Kim clan's influence as well as the Pungyang Jo clan in the end.

Queen Sunwon is buried with her husband in Inreung located in Naegok-dong, Seocho District, Seoul.

== Family ==
- Father
  - Kim Jo-sun (김조순; 金祖淳; 1765–1832)
- Mother
  - Internal Princess Consort Cheongyang of the Cheongsong Sim clan (청양부부인 심씨; 靑陽府夫人 沈氏; 1766–1828)
- Siblings
  - Older brother - Kim Yu-geun (김유근; 金逌根; March 1785 – July 1840); became the adopted son of Kim Yong-sun (김용순; 金龍淳) and Lady Hong of the Pungsan Hong clan (정경부인 풍산 홍씨; 貞敬夫人 豊山 洪氏)
  - Older brother - Kim Won-geun (김원근; 金元根; 1786–1832)
  - Younger sister - Lady Kim of the Andong Kim clan (김씨; 1792–?)
  - Younger sister - Lady Kim of the Andong Kim clan (김씨; 1794–?)
  - Younger sister - Lady Kim of the Andong Kim clan (김씨; 1795–?)
  - Younger brother - Kim Jwa-geun (김좌근; 金左根; 1797–1869)
  - Younger brother - Kim Son-geun (김손근; 金遜根)
- Husband
  - Yi Gong, King Sunjo (조선 순조; 29 July 1790 – 13 December 1834)
- Issue
  - Son - Crown Prince Hyomyeong (효명세자; 18 September 1809 – 25 June 1830)
  - Daughter - Princess Myeongon (명온공주; 1810–1832)
  - Daughter - Princess Bokon (복온공주; 1818–1832)
  - Unnamed son (1820–1820)
  - Daughter - Princess Deokon (덕온공주; 1822–1844)
  - Adoptive son - King Cheoljong of Joseon (철종대왕; 25 July 1831 – 16 January 1864)

== In popular culture ==
- Portrayed by Han Soo-yeon in the 2016 KBS2 TV series Moonlight Drawn by Clouds.
- Portrayed by Bae Jong-ok in the 2020–2021 tvN TV series Mr. Queen.

Queen Sunwon Andong Kim clan
Royal titles
Preceded by Queen Hyoui of the Cheongpung Kim clan	Queen consort of Joseon; 1802 – 14 December 1834	Succeeded by Queen Hyohyeon of the Cheongpung Kim clan
Preceded by Queen Dowager Hyoui of the Cheongpung Kim clan	Queen dowager of Joseon; 14 December 1834 – 18 December 1834	Succeeded by Queen Dowager Hyoyu (Sinjeong) of the Pungyang Jo clan
Preceded by Grand Queen Dowager Yesun (Jeongsun) of the Gyeongju Kim clan	Grand queen dowager of Joseon; 18 December 1834 – 21 September 1857	Succeeded by Grand Queen Dowager Hyoyu (Sinjeong) of the Pungyang Jo clan
