= Princess Bokon =

Korean Princess

Princess Bokon 복온공주
- Born: 26 October 1818; Gyeonghuigung, Hanseong, Joseon now Seoul, South Korea
- Died: 12 May 1832 (aged 13); Joseon
- Spouse: Kim Byeong-ju, Prince Consort Changnyeong (m. 1830–1832)
- House: Jeonju Yi (by birth) Andong Kim (by marriage)
- Father: Sunjo of Joseon
- Mother: Queen Sunwon of the Andong Kim clan

Princess Bokon (Korean: 복온공주; Hanja: 福溫公主; 26 October 1818 – 12 May 1832) was a Korean princess, as the second daughter of Sunjo of Joseon and Queen Sunwon of the Andong Kim clan.

== Biography ==
She was born on October 26, 1818, as the second daughter and third child of Sunjo of Joseon and Queen Sunwon of the Andong Kim clan. On November 10, 1824, at the age of seven, she was granted the title of Princess Bokon (복온공주; 福溫公主).

On April 20, 1830, when she was 11 years old, there was a selection for her husband and the winner was Kim Byeong-ju (김병주), son of Kim Yeon-geun (김연근), from the Andong Kim clan. They were formally married on May 20, 1830, and he was granted the title of Prince Consort Changnyeong (창녕위).

Princess Bokon died just 2 years after the wedding on May 12, 1832. After her death, her husband adopted a male relative from his clan to continue their line.

Her husband was later buried alongside her when he died on March 28, 1853 at the age of 34. The tomb is known as Gongjureung (공주릉) or "The Princess's tomb".

The properties in Beon-dong, Seoul, which belonged to the Princess and her husband, were designated as cultural property No. 40 of the Seoul Metropolitan Government on September 13, 2002.

== Family ==
- Father: Sunjo of Joseon (조선 순조왕; 29 July 1790 – 13 December 1834)
- Mother: Queen Sunwon of the Andong Kim clan (순원왕후 김씨; 8 June 1789 – 21 September 1857)

Sibling(s):

- Older brother: Yi Yeong, Crown Prince Hyomyeong (이영 효명세자; 18 September 1809 – 25 June 1830)
  - Sister-in-law: Crown Princess Jo of the Pungyang Jo clan (세자빈 조씨; 21 January 1809 – 4 June 1890)
    - Nephew: Heonjong of Joseon (조선 헌종왕; 8 September 1827 – 25 July 1849)
- Older sister: Princess Myeongon (명온공주; 13 October 1810 – 13 June 1832)
- Younger sister: Princess Deokon (덕온공주; 10 June 1822 – 24 May 1844)

Consort:

- Husband: Kim Byeon-ju, Prince Consort Changnyeong (김병주 창녕위; 1819–1853)
- Issue
  - Adoptive Son: Kim Do-gyun (김도균; 1832–1909); son of Kim Byeong-gyo (김병교; 1797–1869)
    - Adoptive Daughter-in-law: Lady Jeong of the Yeongil Jeong clan (영일 정씨; 1831–1916); daughter of Jeong Hae-seong (정해상; 1811–1873)
      - Adoptive (adopted) Grandson: Kim Seok-jin (김석진; 1843–1910); eldest son of Kim Nak-gyun (김낙균; 1823–?)
