= Princess Deokon =

Korean princess (1822–1844)

Princess Deokon 덕온공주
- Born: 1822; Joseon
- Died: 1844 (aged 21-22); Joseon
- Spouse: Yun Ui-seon, Prince Consort Namnyeong (m. 1837–1844)
- Issue: Lady Yun; Yun Yong-gu (adopted son)
- House: Jeonju Yi (by birth) Haepyeong Yun (by marriage)
- Father: Sunjo of Joseon
- Mother: Queen Sunwon of the Andong Kim clan

Princess Deokon (Korean: 덕온공주; Hanja: 德溫公主; 1822–1844) was the youngest daughter of Sunjo of Joseon and Queen Sunwon of the Andong Kim clan. She was the last Princess of Korea born to a King and Queen.

== Biography ==
The Princess was born in 1822 as the youngest daughter of Sunjo of Joseon and Queen Sunwon of the Andong Kim clan. On 6 March 1829, at the age 8 years old, she was granted the title of Princess Deokon.

Her father died on 13 December 1834, when she was 12 years old.

Three years later, on August 13, 1837 (during the reign of her nephew, Heonjong of Joseon), she married Yun Ui-seon (윤의선), son of Yun Chi-seung (윤치승; 1790–?). Her husband was later honoured as Prince Consort Namnyeong (남녕위).

Princess Deokon died 7 years after her marriage, on 1844, when she was around 21 to 22 years old. It was said that she lost her life two hours after giving birth to a daughter, who also died soon after. Meanwhile, her husband, Yun Ui-seon, died in 1887 around the age of 64 to 65 during the 24th year of Emperor Gojong's reign.

== Others ==
The Princess' clothes and belongings were added to South Korea's Intangible Cultural Heritage, which were kept by Yun Yong-gu's daughter, Yun Baek-yeong, and it is known that in the 1960s they were collected by Seok Ju-seon (석주선). Her Memorial Museum at Dankook University keeps 228 objects which belonged to the Princess and her descendants, in an exhibition called "The Last Princess of Joseon, The Relics of Princess Deokon" ('조선의 마지막 공주, 덕온가(家)의 유물전').

== Family ==
- Father: Sunjo of Joseon (조선 순조왕; 29 July 1790 – 13 December 1834)
- Mother: Queen Sunwon of the Andong Kim clan (순원왕후 김씨; 8 June 1789 – 21 September 1857)

Siblings:

- Older brother: Yi Yeong, Crown Prince Hyomyeong (이영 효명세자; 18 September 1809 – 25 June 1830)
  - Sister-in-law: Crown Princess Jo of the Pungyang Jo clan (세자빈 조씨; 21 January 1809 – 4 June 1890)
    - Nephew: Heonjong of Joseon (조선 헌종왕; 8 September 1827 – 25 July 1849)
      - Niece-in-law: Queen Hyohyeon of the Andong Kim clan (효현왕후 김씨; 27 April 1828 – 18 October 1843)
      - Niece-in-law: Queen Hyojeong of the Namyang Hong clan (효정왕후 홍씨; 6 March 1831 – 2 January 1904)
- Older sister: Princess Myeongon (명온공주; 13 October 1810 – 13 June 1832)
- Older sister: Princess Bokon (복온공주; 26 October 1818 – 12 May 1832)

Husband:

- Yun Ui-seon, Prince Consort Namnyeong (윤의선 남녕위; 南寧尉 尹宜善; 1822–1887)

Issue:

- Daughter: Lady Yun (1844)
- Adoptive son: Yun Yong-gu (윤용구; 尹用求; 1853–1939)
