= Love in the Moonlight =

2016 South Korean television series

- Promotional poster
- Hangul: 구르미 그린 달빛
- Lit.: Moonlight Drawn by Clouds
- RR: Gureumi geurin dalbit
- MR: Kurŭmi kŭrin talpit
- Genre: Historical; Coming-of-age; Romantic-comedy
- Based on: Moonlight Drawn by Clouds by Yoon Yi-soo (story) and Kim Hee-kyung (illustrations)
- Developed by: KBS Drama Production
- Written by: Kim Min-jung; Im Ye-jin
- Directed by: Kim Seong-yoon; Baek Sang-hoon
- Creative directors: Kang Su-yeon; Lee Seo-jaejun; Oh Hyo-jung
- Starring: Park Bo-gum; Kim You-jung; Jung Jin-young; Chae Soo-bin; Kwak Dong-yeon
- Theme music composer: Gaemi
- Opening theme: "Moonlight Flows" by Second Moon
- Composer: Gaemi
- Country of origin: South Korea
- Original language: Korean
- No. of episodes: 18 + 1 special

Production
- Executive producers: Kang Byung-taek; Lee Jae-gil
- Producer: Yoon Jae-hyuk
- Cinematography: Kim Si-hyung; Lee Min-ung
- Editor: Lee Dong-hyun
- Camera setup: Single camera
- Running time: 60 minutes
- Production companies: KBS Media; Love in the Moonlight SPC

Original release
- Network: KBS2
- Release: August 22 – October 18, 2016

Love in the Moonlight (Korean: 구르미 그린 달빛) is a South Korean television series starring Park Bo-gum, Kim You-jung, Jung Jin-young, Chae Soo-bin, and Kwak Dong-yeon. It is a coming-of-age story and youth romance set during 19th-century Joseon Dynasty based on the web novel Moonlight Drawn By Clouds which was first serialized on Naver in 2013 and consequently published as a five-part series of books in 2015. It aired on KBS2 at 22:00 (KST) every Monday and Tuesday for 18 episodes from August 22, 2016, until October 18, 2016.

A commercial and critical success, Love in the Moonlight achieved a peak audience rating of 23.3% in South Korea and was praised for its production, performances and music. It won Best Drama Series at the 22nd Asian Television Awards, and received six nominations at the 53rd Baeksang Arts Awards where it won popularity Awards for leads Park and Kim. The press referred to its influence as "Moonlight Syndrome" as it topped topicality, content and brand reputation charts during and beyond its run.

== Synopsis ==
The series is a coming-of-age story about Crown Prince Lee Yeong's (Park Bo-gum) growth from a boy into a revered monarch, and his unlikely relationship with eunuch Hong Ra-on (Kim You-jung).

== Cast ==
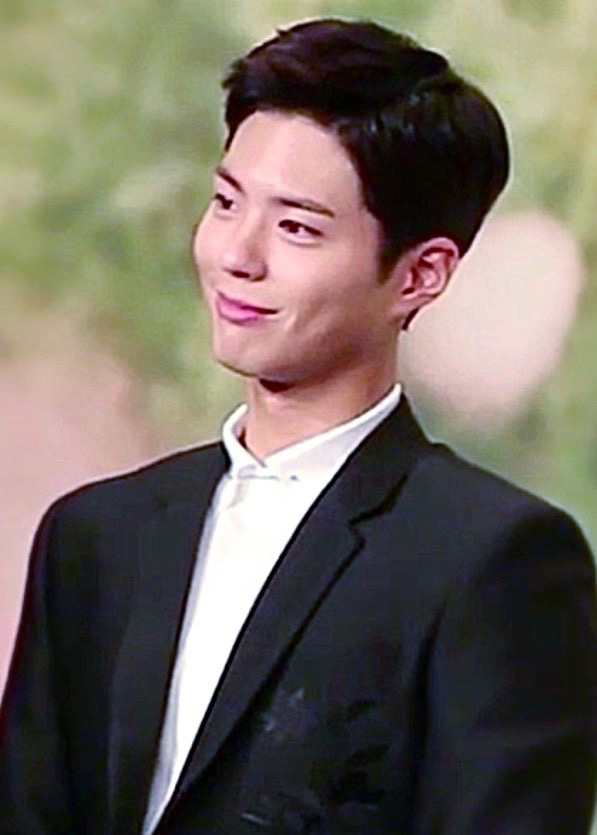
Park Bo-gum
(Yeong)

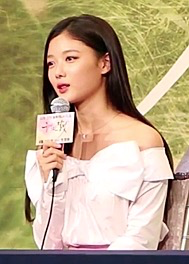
Kim You-jung
(Ra-on / Sam-nom)

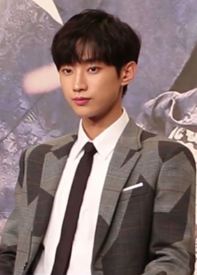
Jung Jin-young
(Yoon-sung)

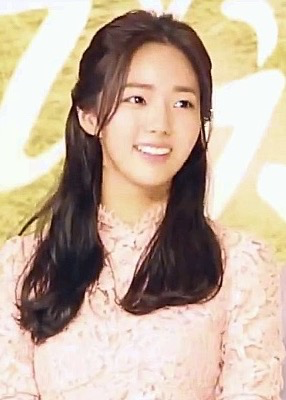
Chae Soo-bin
(Ha-yeon)

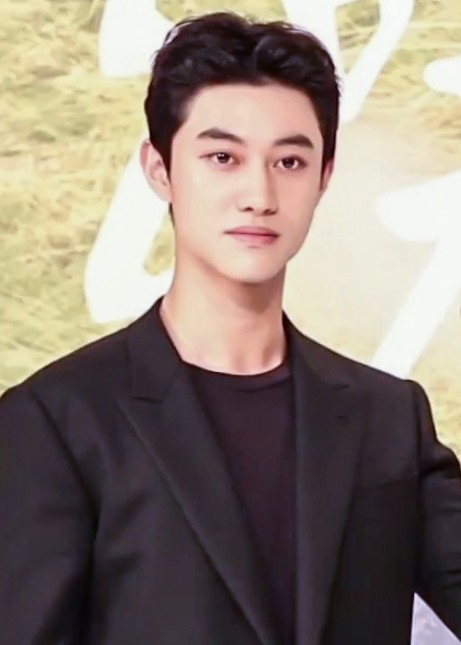
Kwak Dong-yeon
(Byung-yeon)

=== Main ===
- Park Bo-gum as Lee Yeong
  - Jung Yoon-seok as young Yeong

He is the only son of the King and heir to the throne. Smart, bright, and mischievous, he is disliked by his servants for being unpredictable. He has an affinity for the arts and music. He initially dislikes his father, blaming him for his mother's death. He is close to Consort Park and dislikes Kim Heon and Queen Kim. He falls for Ra-on.

- Kim You-jung as Hong Ra-on/Hong Sam-nom
  - Kim Ji-young as young Ra-on

Popular and street-smart, she was raised as a boy by her mother and makes a living by disguising herself as a male relationship counselor and romance novel author under the name Sam-nom. She eventually becomes a eunuch of Yeong. Looking for her mother, she hides immense pain behind her cheerful attitude. She falls in love with Lee Yeong.

- Jung Jin-young as Kim Yoon-sung
  - Lee Hyo-je as young Yoon-sung

Charismatic and poised, he is a scholar born to a powerful family. He grew up alongside Yeong and used to be best friends with him. He has known Ra-on's secret since their first meeting, but pretends not to know it.

- Chae Soo-bin as Jo Ha-yeon

A lady ahead of her generation, she is proud, worldly and straightforward. As the daughter of the influential Minister of Rites, she is chosen as the crown princess of Yeong.

- Kwak Dong-yeon as Kim Byung-yeon
  - Noh Kang-min as young Byung-yeon

A skilled swordsman and scholar, he is also the Head of the Royal Guard of the Crown Prince's palace. Not only is he Yeong's childhood friend, but he is also his trusted confidant. However, he hides a secret that he cannot tell Lee-yeong, for fear of losing his trust.

=== Supporting ===
Royals

- Kim Seung-soo as the King Sunjo
- Seo Jeong-yeon as Queen Yoon
- Jeon Mi-seon as Park Suk-ui
- Jung Hye-sung as Princess Myeong-eun
- Heo Jung-eun as Princess Yeongeun, Lady Park's daughter
- Kim Jin-yi as Pregnant court lady

Eunuchs and maids

- Jang Gwang as Eunuch Han
- Lee Jun-hyeok as Eunuch Jang
- Jo Hee-bong as Eunuch Sung
- Choi Dae-chul as Eunuch Ma
- Tae Hang-ho as Do Gi
- Oh Eui-shik as Park Seong Yeol
- Cha Joo-young as Ae Sim-i
- Jung Yoo-min as Wol-hee

Kim clan

- Chun Ho-jin as Kim Heon, Prime Minister
- Han Soo-yeon as Queen Kim
- Park Chul-min as Kim Eui-gyo, Minister of Personnel
- Bang Joong-hyun as Kim Geun-gyo, Minister of Taxation

Hong clan

- Jung Hae-kyun as Hong Gyeong-nae
- Kim Yeo-jin as Kim So-sa

Jo clan and advisors

- Lee Dae-yeon as Jo Man-hyeong, Minister of Rites
- Ahn Nae-sang as Jeong Yak-yong
- Ahn Se-ha as Master Jung Deok-ho

=== Special appearances ===
- Kim Byung-chul as Yeong's teacher
- Cha Tae-hyun as a farm servant
- Cho Yeo-jeong as a noble lady
- Jung Yi-rang as gukbap lady
- Lee Sung-jae as master Jeong (Ep.4)
- Lee Moon-sik as a man who castrates
- Kim Seul-gi as a eunuch trainee

== Production ==
=== Development and casting ===
In December 2015, KBS Media announced that they will be adapting and producing the popular novel Moonlight Drawn by Clouds (Korean: 구르미 그린 달빛, Gureumi geurin dalbit) written by Yoon Yi-soo. Park Bo-gum joined the project in February 2016 and Kim You-jung boarded in April. The first script reading was held in Yeoido, Seoul on May 26, 2016, and filming began in early June. Love in the Moonlight is the second collaboration between director Kim Seong-yoon and writers Kim Min-jung and Im Ye-jin after working on Who Are You: School 2015 and director Baek Sang-hoon, cinematographer Kim Si-hyeong and music director Gaemi after working on Descendants of the Sun (2016).

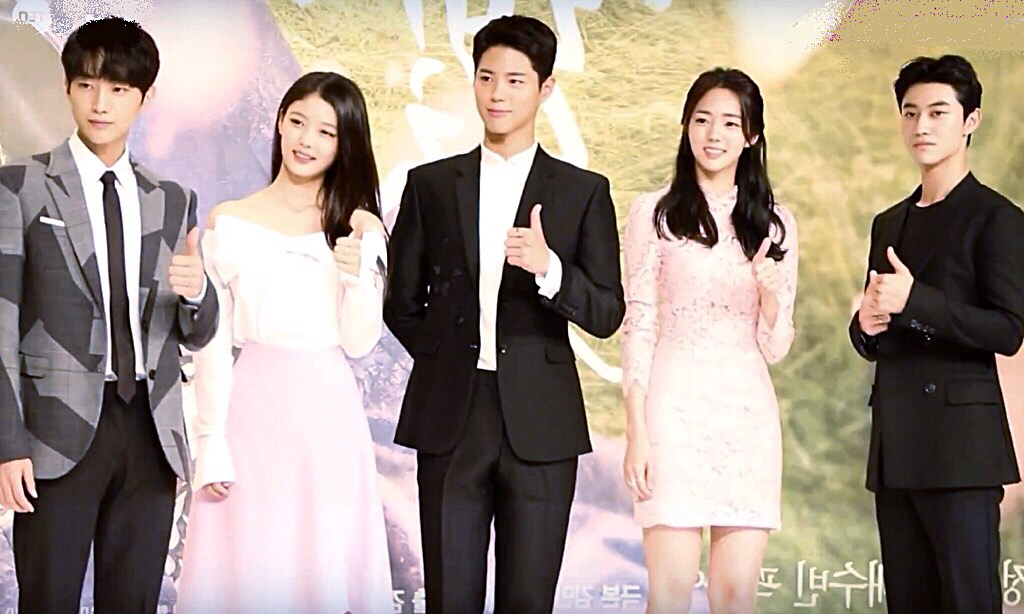
Left to right: Jinyoung, Kim You-jung, Park Bo-gum, Chae Soo-bin and Kwak Dong-yeon at the series' press conference in August 2016

=== Marketing ===
The drama's first teaser, with lead actor Park dressed in dragon robe dancing to Jessy Matador's French pop song "Bomba" in front of Gwanghwamun, was released in July 2016 and became a viral hit.

In a press conference held on August 18, 2016, director Kim Seong-yoon indicated that despite the series being set in the 19th century, the production aimed to show a more contemporary message, adding: "Our focus was on creating a romance that's pretty and charming but also sad. We'd like viewers to be able to identify with the emotions displayed. There's no grand metaphor. Rather than unveiling a political message, we focused on telling a story that's easy to identify with."

== Release ==
Love in the Moonlight aired on KBS2 at 22:00 (KST) every Monday and Tuesday for 18 episodes from August 22, 2016, until October 18, 2016. The series aired worldwide, with English subtitles, starting August 23, 2016, every Tuesday and Wednesday at 21:50 (KST) on KBS World. It also streams internationally on Netflix.

In partnership with Viki, which also streams the series internationally, the series screened at the University of California, Berkeley in October 2016 as a joint project of the campus' Korea-centric organizations, KUNA and K-Popular.

== Media ==
=== Original soundtrack ===
Love in the Moonlight Original Soundtrack

Soundtrack album by Various Artists
- Released: October 27, 2016
- Genres: Soundtrack, Ballad, Pop
- Language: Korean
- Labels: OU Entertainment; NHN Bugs (Digital, CD); Universal Music Group (CD)
- Producer: Gaemi

In August 2016, OU Entertainment's Gaemi, real name Kang Dong-yoon, joined the project as music director. Jinyoung, who plays Yoon-sung, composed and produced "Misty Road" sung by Ben. "My Person", which lead actor Park finished recording in October 2016 was co-written by composer Kim Se-jin. It topped Melon, Mnet, Bugs, olleh, Soribada, Genie, Naver and Monkey3 charts upon its release.

The two-disc soundtrack album was released on October 27, 2016, and consists of 13 tracks including a humming version of "Because I Miss You", 13 instrumentals and three special background music created by folk-fusion band Second Moon. The drama marked the comeback of acclaimed balladeers Sung Si-kyung and Baek Ji-young after two years.

==== Track list ====
Love in the Moonlight OST (CD 1)
No.	Title	Writer(s)	Artist	Length
1.	"No Sleep (잠은 다 잤나봐요)"		Soyou (Sistar), Yoo Seung-woo	3:40
2.	"Swallowing My Heart (마음을 삼킨다)"		Sandeul (B1A4)	3:49
3.	"Moonlight Drawn by Clouds (구르미 그린 달빛)"		Gummy	3:58
4.	"Misty Road (안갯길)"	Jinyoung (B1A4)	Ben	3:58
5.	"Fondly, Goodbye (다정하게, 안녕히)"		Sung Si-kyung	3:46
6.	"Melting (녹는다)"		K.Will	4:09
7.	"A Love Shining Like a Star (별처럼 빛나는 사랑)"		Eddy Kim	3:18
8.	"Because I Miss You, Raon ver. (그리워 그리워서, 라온 ver.)"		Beige	3:22
9.	"Love is Over"		Baek Ji-young	3:43
10.	"Interlocked Fingers (깍지)"		Lee Juck	4:06
11.	"My Person (내 사람)"		Park Bo-gum	3:53
12.	"Because I Miss You, Yeong ver. (그리워 그리워서, 이영 ver.)"		Hwang Chi-yeul	3:33
13.	"Because I Miss You, (Humming ver.)"		Beige	3:29

Love in the Moonlight OST (CD 2)
No.	Title	Artist	Length
1.	"Moonlight Flows (달빛이 흐른다)"	Second Moon	2:51
2.	"While We Were Apart (별후광음)"	Second Moon	4:11
3.	"Take My Hand (내 손을 잡아요)"	Second Moon	3:04
4.	"Yeong's Waltz (영의 왈츠)"	Various Artists	2:37
5.	"Disapprove (불허한다)"	Various Artists	1:57
6.	"When We Were Crying in the Moonlight (그대와 내가 내리는 달빛 아래서 눈물을 흘릴 때)"	Various Artists	2:39
7.	"Raon's Song (라온의 노래)"	Various Artists	3:37
8.	"Moonlight (월광)"	Various Artists	3:37
9.	"Just Thinking of You (바라만 봅니다 그래도 행복합니다)"	Various Artists	2:44
10.	"Somewhere Over the Cloud (저 구름 너머에 있는)"	Various Artists	4:11
11.	"My Love (내 사람입니다)"	Various Artists	3:19
12.	"Be With Me, My Dad (아버지가 되어주십시오)"	Various Artists	3:31
13.	"Friend, And Now, We Are... (동무, 그리고 지금 우린...)"	Various Artists	3:08
14.	"Uprising (민란)"	Various Artists	2:07
15.	"Lotus Lantern Festival (연등축제에서 우리 두 사람)"	Various Artists	3:07
16.	"Light of Destiny (운명의 빛)"	Various Artists	2:37

==== Chart performance ====
Songs

Title	Year	Peak chart positions	Sales (Digital)	Remarks
Title	Year	KOR Gaon	Sales (Digital)	Remarks
"No Sleep" (Soyou (Sistar), Yoo Seung-woo)	2016	4	KOR: 504,277+	Part 1
"Swallowing My Heart" (Sandeul (B1A4))	2016	11	KOR: 138,514+	Part 2
"Moonlight Drawn By Clouds" (Gummy)	2016	3	KOR: 827,403+	Part 3
"Misty Road" (Ben)	2016	5	KOR: 344,450+	Part 4
"Fondly, Goodbye" (Sung Si-kyung)	2016	2	KOR: 558,530+	Part 5
"Melting" (K.Will)	2016	8	KOR: 147,604+	Part 6
"A Love Shining Like a Star" (Eddy Kim)	2016	21	KOR: 62,555+	Part 7
"Because I Miss You, Raon ver." (Beige)	2016	6	KOR: 186,767+	Part 8
"Love is Over" (Baek Ji-young)	2016	5	KOR: 168,582+	Part 9
"Interlocked Fingers" (Lee Juck)	2016	23	KOR: 53,056+	Part 10
"My Person" (Park Bo-gum)	2016	3	KOR: 335,921+	Part 11
"Because I Miss You, Yeong ver." (Hwang Chi-yeul)	2016	8	KOR: 98,608+	Part 12

Album

Title	Album details	Peak chart positions	Sales
Title	Album details	KOR	Sales
Love in the Moonlight Original Soundtrack	Released: October 27, 2016; Label: OU Entertainment Bugs (Digital, CD) Universal Music Group (CD); Formats: CD, digital download	5	KOR: 18,467+

=== Press ===
Title	Authors	Publisher	Publication Date	ISBN	Ref.
Love in the Moonlight Photo Essay	Yoon Yi-soo, Kim Min-jung, Im Ye-jin	Yolimwon	November 4, 2016	ISBN 9788970638003	

== Reception ==
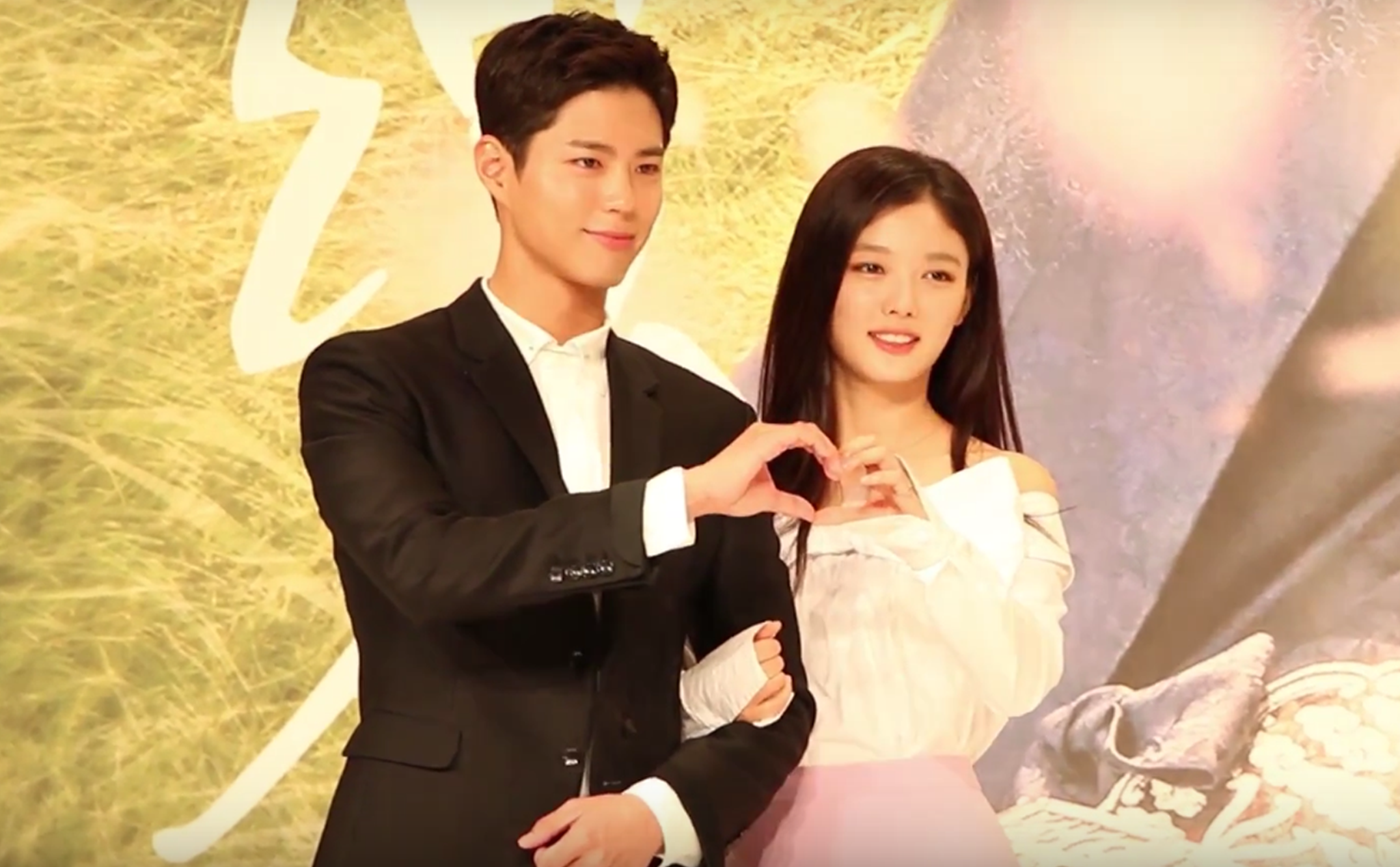
Park Bo-gum (L) and Kim You-jung received praise for their performances

=== Critical response ===
The series was met with praise by critics and audiences for its production, performances and music. Rolling Stone India described the series as "a timeless classic K-drama that looks into the intersection of culture and society" and a love story that "is an odyssey of significance cutting beyond class, stigma, and prejudices", concluding that it is "one of the best historical K-dramas." The publication added that Kim You-jung has "exquisite expressiveness" while "Park Bo-gum is remarkably adept at expressing the subtleties" of his character's emotions.

=== Impact ===
Love in the Moonlight dominated topicality, content and brand reputation charts in and beyond its run which led the media to call its popularity "Moonlight Syndrome". The big data analytics firm Good Data Corporation reported that Park ranked first in overall topicality making him the "Most Buzzworthy Performer" (TV; Drama and Entertainment) for nine consecutive weeks. Media outlets subsequently referred to Park as "Nation's Crown Prince" and "Prince of Asia".

Sales of the novel experienced a 56% increase upon the drama's airing, earning in ₩500 million ($418,000) in profits through a pay-per-read deal. The overseas demand consequently led to its translation in Mandarin and plans on Japanese and Thai translations, among others.

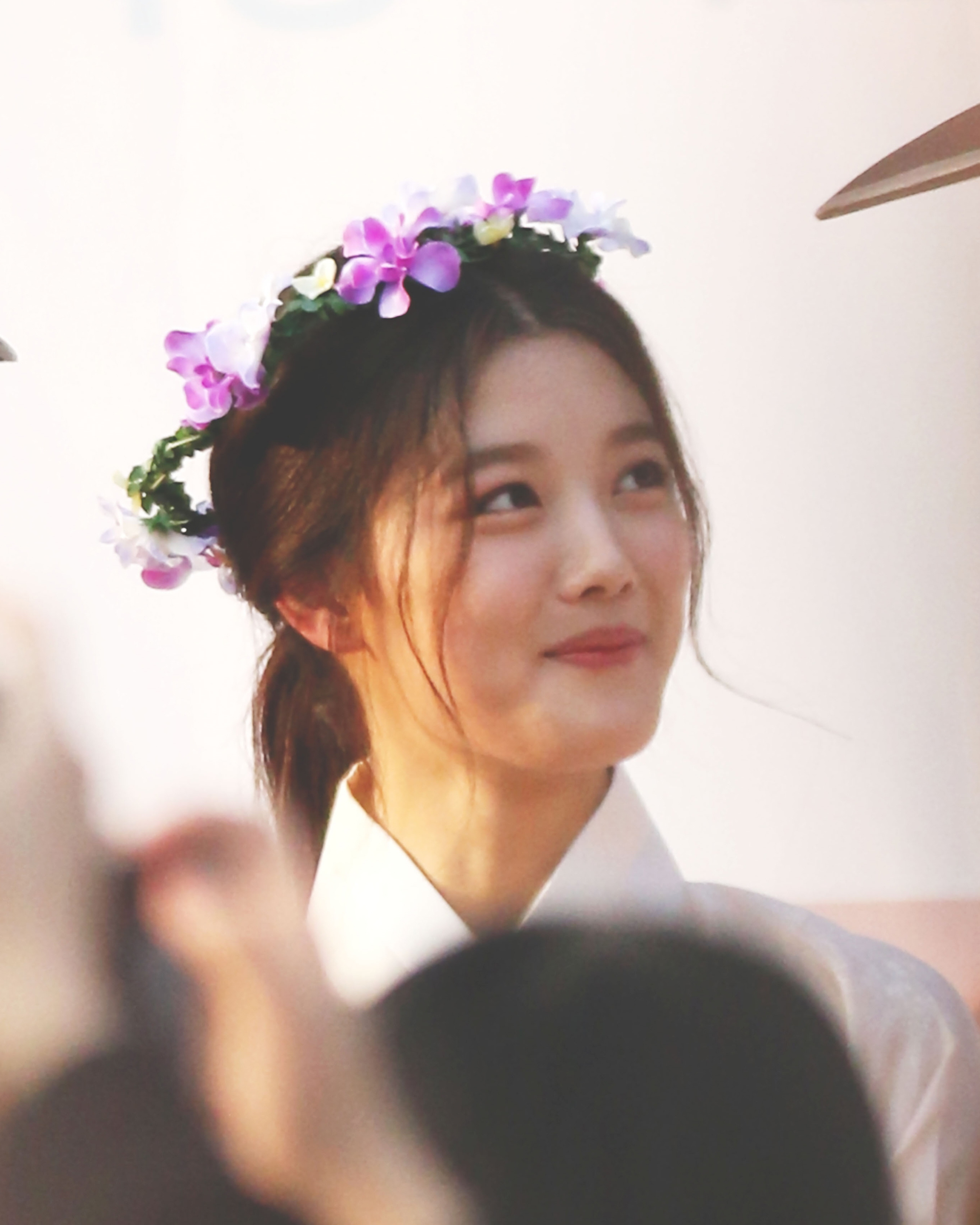
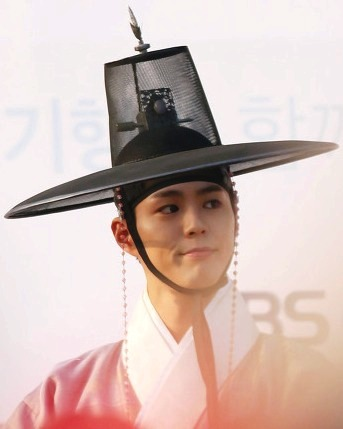
Kim You-jung (L) and Park Bo-gum, in costume, at a fan-signing event at Gyeongbokgung Palace in October 2016

Costume designer Lee Jin-hee was also commended for her work on the production's Joseon-era clothes. Lead actor Park's hanbok were put on exhibit at Tokyo International Forum during his Japan fan meeting the following year. Both KakaoTalk and LINE released Moonlight digital stickers and three of Raon's outfits were made available for purchase in mobile game "I Love Nicky". The eternal bracelets of Yeong and Raon went on sale as official merchandise and the drama's 336-page official photo essay book became a best-seller.

Moonlight has also been parodied in shows like Saturday Night Live Korea and The Return of Superman, among others. In September 2016, KBS Media acquired the rights to adapt Moonlight into a musical production.

On October 19, 2016, Park, Kim, Jinyoung and Kwak held a fan-signing event, wearing their drama costumes, at the historic Gyeongbokgung Palace where scenes of the drama were filmed. More than 5,000 fans gathered to see the cast and the event was also live-streamed on Facebook. A gesture of gratitude for the drama's success, it was a collaborative effort between KBS and the Korea Creative Content Agency.

=== Viewership ===
Love in the Moonlight doubled its premiere ratings on its third episode and remained the undisputed #1 against 3 public broadcasting dramas in the same timeslot. In addition, it became KBS's highest-rated Monday/Tuesday drama since 2010.

Due to high audience ratings, KBS negotiated for the production to extend its original 18 episodes to 20. Chief producer Kang Byung-taek declined saying that the framework of the story had already been laid out and it would only yield complications with the cast and crew's respective schedules.

In this table, the blue numbers represent the lowest ratings and the red numbers represent the highest ratings.

Ep.	Original broadcast date	Title	Average audience share			
Ep.	Original broadcast date	Title	TNmS		AGB Nielsen	
Ep.	Original broadcast date	Title	Nationwide	Seoul	Nationwide	Seoul
1	August 22, 2016	Moonlight Destiny	8.7%	10.0%	8.3%	9.0%
2	August 23, 2016	The Path to You	9.3%	10.4%	8.5%	8.8%
3	August 29, 2016	I'm Behind You	15.5%	17.9%	16.0%	17.4%
4	August 30, 2016	After the Play Ends	17.1%	18.8%	16.4%	16.5%
5	September 5, 2016	Tell Me Your Wish	16.9%	19.3%	19.3%	20.0%
6	September 6, 2016	When I Want to Tell Untold Secrets	17.9%	21.0%	18.8%	18.9%
7	September 12, 2016	Confession	18.4%	22.0%	20.4%	20.9%
8	September 13, 2016	You Don't Know Anything	16.7%	19.8%	19.7%	20.6%
9	September 19, 2016	The Moment the Door of My Heart Opened	17.9%	20.5%	21.3%	22.4%
10	September 20, 2016	Like a Fairy Tale	16.2%	18.6%	19.6%	20.2%
11	September 26, 2016	A Promise	18.6%	20.6%	20.7%	20.6%
12	September 27, 2016	Faith Becomes Destiny	18.6%	21.1%	20.1%	19.9%
13	October 3, 2016	Fondly, Goodbye	16.4%	19.2%	18.5%	18.8%
14	October 4, 2016	Misty Road	17.5%	20.1%	18.7%	19.4%
15	October 10, 2016	Lies That Seem Like the Truth	16.9%	18.8%	17.9%	18.5%
16	October 11, 2016	The World That You Dream Of	17.8%	20.3%	18.8%	17.8%
17	October 17, 2016	The End for the Beginning	22.5%	24.8%	23.3%	23.6%
18	October 18, 2016	Moonlight Drawn By Clouds	21.6%	25.3%	22.9%	22.5%
Average			16.9%	19.4%	18.3%	18.7%
Special	October 18, 2016	Love in the Moonlight: Special	8.4%	9.3%	8.9%	9.4%

- A 57-minute special broadcast was aired on August 29, prior to episode three, and contained condensed versions of episodes one and two.
- A 150-minute Chuseok holiday broadcast was aired on September 16 and consisted of condensed versions of episodes 1 to 8 and behind-the-scenes clips.
- An 85-minute special episode aired after the finale on October 18. It was hosted by comedians Kim Jun-hyun and Jung Yi-rang with narration by the cast. It included behind-the-scenes clips, unreleased footage and interviews.
- A 70-minute, spoiler-filled making-of entitled 150 Days of Traveling in the Moonlight was aired exclusively on KBS World in November 11, 2016.

== Accolades ==
Name of the award ceremony, year presented, category, nominee of the award, and the result of the nomination
Year	Award	Category	Recipient	Result	Ref.
2016	5th APAN Star Awards	Best New Actress	Kim You-jung	Won	
2016	9th Korea Drama Awards	Excellence Award, Actor	Park Bo-gum	Nominated	
2016	Asia Artist Awards	Asia Star Award, Actor	Park Bo-gum	Won	
2016	Asia Artist Awards	Best Star Award, Actor	Park Bo-gum	Won	
2016	Asia Artist Awards	Best Icon Award, Drama	Kim You-jung	Won	
2016	Asia Artist Awards	Best OST	Gummy ("Moonlight Drawn by Clouds")	Won	
2016	Asia Artist Awards	Popularity Award, Actor	Park Bo-gum	Nominated	
2016	Asia Artist Awards	Popularity Award, Actress	Kim You-jung	Nominated	
2025	Asia Artist Awards	Legendary Couple	Park Bo-gum and Kim You-jung	Won	
2016	18th Mnet Asian Music Awards	Best OST	Gummy ("Moonlight Drawn by Clouds")	Nominated	
2016	30th KBS Drama Awards	Grand Prize (Daesang)	Park Bo-gum	Nominated	
2016	30th KBS Drama Awards	Top Excellence Award, Actor	Park Bo-gum	Won	
2016	30th KBS Drama Awards	Top Excellence Award, Actress	Kim You-jung	Nominated	
2016	30th KBS Drama Awards	Excellence Award, Actor in a Mid-length Drama	Park Bo-gum	Nominated	
2016	30th KBS Drama Awards	Excellence Award, Actress in a Mid-length Drama	Kim You-jung	Won	
2016	30th KBS Drama Awards	Excellence Award, Actress in a Mid-length Drama	Chae Soo-bin	Nominated	
2016	30th KBS Drama Awards	Best Supporting Actor	Lee Jun-hyeok	Won	
2016	30th KBS Drama Awards	Best Supporting Actress	Jung Hye-sung	Nominated	
2016	30th KBS Drama Awards	Best New Actor	Kwak Dong-yeon	Nominated	
2016	30th KBS Drama Awards	Best New Actor	Jinyoung	Won	
2016	30th KBS Drama Awards	Best New Actress	Kim You-jung	Nominated	
2016	30th KBS Drama Awards	Netizen Award, Actor	Park Bo-gum	Won	
2016	30th KBS Drama Awards	Netizen Award, Actor	Jinyoung	Nominated	
2016	30th KBS Drama Awards	Best Young Actor	Jung Yun-seok	Won	
2016	30th KBS Drama Awards	Best Young Actress	Heo Jung-eun	Won	
2016	30th KBS Drama Awards	Best Couple	Park Bo-gum & Kim You-jung	Won	
2017	29th South Korean Directors and Producers Awards	Best Television Drama	Love in the Moonlight	Nominated	
2017	50th Annual WorldFest Houston	Platinum Remi Award	Love in the Moonlight	Won	
2017	53rd Baeksang Arts Awards	Best Drama	Love in the Moonlight	Nominated	
2017	53rd Baeksang Arts Awards	Best Actor, Television	Park Bo-gum	Nominated	
2017	53rd Baeksang Arts Awards	Best New Actor, Television	Jinyoung	Nominated	
2017	53rd Baeksang Arts Awards	Most Popular Actor, Television	Park Bo-gum	Won	
2017	53rd Baeksang Arts Awards	Most Popular Actor, Television	Jinyoung	Nominated	
2017	53rd Baeksang Arts Awards	Most Popular Actress, Television	Kim You-jung	Won	
2017	12th Seoul International Drama Awards	Top Excellence Award for a Hallyu Drama	Love in the Moonlight	Won	
2017	12th Seoul International Drama Awards	Outstanding Korean Actor	Park Bo-gum	Won	
2017	10th Korea Drama Awards	Best Drama	Love in the Moonlight	Nominated	
2017	10th Korea Drama Awards	Best Production Director	Kim Seong-yoon	Nominated	
2017	10th Korea Drama Awards	Best Screenwriter	Kim Min-jung	Nominated	
2017	10th Korea Drama Awards	Top Excellence Award, Actor	Park Bo-gum	Nominated	
2017	10th Korea Drama Awards	Best New Actor	Jinyoung	Nominated	
2017	10th Korea Drama Awards	Best New Actor	Kwak Dong-yeon	Nominated	
2017	22nd Asian Television Awards	Best Drama Series	Love in the Moonlight	Won	

== See also ==
- Young Actors' Retreat (2022)
