= Crown Prince Hyomyeong =

Crown Prince of Joseon (1809–1830)

- King of Joseon (posthumously); Emperor of Korea (posthumously)
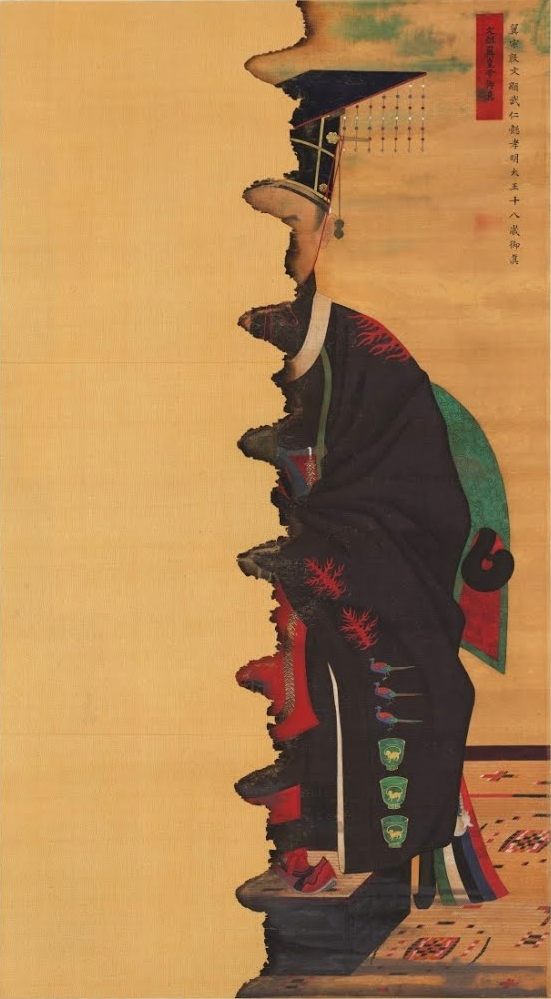
- Portrait in ceremonial attire, which was damaged in the 1954 Busan fire

Regent of Joseon
- Tenure: 15 March 1827 – 25 June 1830
- Monarch: Sunjo

Crown Prince of Joseon
- Tenure: 12 August 1812 – 25 June 1830
- Investiture: Injeongjeon, Changdeokgung
- Predecessor: Crown Prince Hong
- Successor: Crown Prince Cheok
- Born: 18 September 1809; Daejojeon, Changdeokgung, Hanseong, Joseon
- Died: 25 June 1830 (aged 20); Heojeongdang, Changdeokgung, Hanseong, Joseon
- Burial: Sureung, Donggureung Cluster, Guri, South Korea
- Spouse: Queen Sinjeong (m. 1819)
- Issue Detail: Heonjong of Joseon; Gojong of Korea (adopted)
Names
- Yi Yeong (이영; 李旲)
Regnal name
- Chewon Chanhwa Seoggeuk Jeongmyeong Seongheon Yeongcheol Yeseong Yeongyeong Yungdeok Sungong Dokhyu Honggyeong Hongun Seongryeol Seongwang Junsang Yoheum Sungong Ugeun Tangjeong Gyecheon Geontong Sinhun Sukmo Geondae Gonhu Gwangeob Yeongjo Jangui Changryun Haenggeon Baenyeong Gitae Suyu Huibeom Changhui Ibgyeong Hyeongdo Seongheon Sojang (체원찬화석극정명성헌영철예성연경융덕순공독휴홍경홍운성렬선광준상요흠순공우근탕정계천건통신훈숙모건대곤후광업영조장의창륜행건배녕기태수유희범창희입경형도성헌소장; 體元贊化錫極定命聖憲英哲睿誠淵敬隆德純功篤休弘慶洪運盛烈宣光濬祥堯欽舜恭禹勤湯正啓天建通神勳肅謨乾大坤厚廣業永祚莊義彰倫行健配寧基泰垂裕熙範昌禧立經亨道成獻昭章) (Note: Known as honorific name (존호; 尊號) in the Sinosphere, its closest equivalent in the English-speaking world is the regnal name.)
Posthumous name
- Joseon: Crown Prince Hyomyeong (효명세자; 孝明世子) → Great King Gangmok Donmun Hyeonmu Inui Hyomyeong (강목돈문현무인의효명대왕; 康穆敦文顯武仁懿孝明大王); Korean Empire: Emperor Donmun Hyeonmu Inui Hyomyeong Ik (돈문현무인의효명익황제; 敦文顯武仁懿孝明翼皇帝); Qing dynasty: Gangmok (강목; 康穆)
Temple name
- Ikjong (익종; 翼宗) → Munjo (문조; 文祖) (Note: Conferred in 1834 and 1899, respectively.)
- Clan: Jeonju Yi
- Dynasty: Yi
- Father: King Sunjo
- Mother: Queen Sunwon
- Religion: Confucianism (Neo-Confucianism)

Korean name
- Hangul: 효명세자
- Hanja: 孝明世子
- RR: Hyomyeong seja
- MR: Hyomyŏng seja

Art name
- Hangul: 경헌, 학석, 담여헌
- Hanja: 敬軒, 鶴石, 淡如軒
- RR: Gyeongheon, Hakseok, Damyeoheon
- MR: Kyŏnghŏn, Haksŏk, Tamyŏhŏn

Courtesy name
- Hangul: 덕인
- Hanja: 德寅
- RR: Deokin
- MR: Tŏgin

Crown Prince Hyomyeong (Korean: 효명세자; Hanja: 孝明世子; 18 September 1809 – 25 June 1830), personal name Yi Yeong, also known by his temple name King Munjo, was the only son of King Sunjo, the 23rd monarch of Joseon, and the father of King Heonjong. Following the establishment of the Korean Empire, he was honored as Emperor Ik.

== Biography ==
Yi Yeong was the eldest child of King Sunjo and Queen Sunwon.

In 1817, he was admitted to the Sungkyunkwan. In 1819, he was appointed as crown prince. A genius in literature and the arts, he was a writer and composer, and created several court dances (정재). He used court ritual to validate and augment the king's control over the government.

Yi Yeong first became active in politics at the age of 17, due to his father illness. He pursued various political reforms and his avoidance of nepotism created several enemies amongst his maternal relatives. The prince served as regent from 1827 until his death three years later.

== Legacy ==
The prince was commemorated in an album of six scenes created to celebrate the commencement of his learning at Sungkyunkwan, one of a number of documentary paintings of the Joseon period.

Among the 53 remaining Joseon court dances, 26 are his works. His Chunaengjeon ("Dance of the Spring Nightingale") is the best known and most beloved traditional court dance for its gentle and poetic movements. He is one of the most prominent figures in the history of Korean court rituals, along with Sejong the Great.

== Family ==
- Father: King Sunjo (순조대왕; 29 July 1790 – 13 December 1834)
  - Grandfather: King Jeongjo (정조대왕; 28 October 1752 – 18 August 1800)
  - Biological grandmother: Concubine Su (수빈), of the Bannam Park clan (반남 박씨; 1 June 1770 – 6 February 1823)
  - Legal grandmother: Queen Hyoui (효의왕후), of the Cheongpung Kim clan (Korean: 청풍 김씨; 25 December 1753 – 29 March 1821)
- Mother: Queen Sunwon (순원왕후), of the (new) Andong Kim clan (신 안동 김씨; 8 June 1789 – 21 September 1857)
  - Grandfather: Kim Jo-sun (김조순), Internal Prince Yeongan (영안부원군; 7 October 1765 – 2 May 1832)
  - Grandmother: Internal Princess Consort Cheongyang (청양부부인), of the Cheongsong Shim clan (청송 심씨; 1766–1828)

Consort(s) and their respective issue

- Queen Sinjeong (신정왕후), of the Pungyang Jo clan (풍양 조씨; 9 January 1809 – 23 May 1890)
  - Yi Hwan (이환), King Heonjong (헌종대왕; 8 September 1827 – 25 July 1849), first son
  - Yi Hui (이희), Emperor Gojong (고종황제; 8 September 1852 – 21 January 1919), adopted son

== Ancestry ==
Ancestors of Crown Prince Hyomyeong

King Yeongjo (영조대왕)
King Jangjo (장조대왕)
Concubine Yeong, of the Jeonui Yi clan (영빈 전의 이씨)
King Jeongjo (정조대왕)
Hong Bong-han, Internal Prince Yeongpung (영풍부원군 홍봉한)
Queen Heongyeong, of the Pungsan Hong clan (헌경왕후 풍산 홍씨)
Internal Princess Consort Hansan, of the Hansan Yi clan (한산부부인 한산 이씨) (Note: Daughter of Yi Jib (이집) and elder sister of Lady Yi; see below.)
King Sunjo (순조대왕)
Park Sa-seok (박사석)
Park Jun-won (박준원)
Lady, of the Gigye Yu clan (기계 유씨)
Concubine Su, of the Bannam Park clan (수빈 반남 박씨)
Won Gyeong-yu (원경유)
Lady, of the Wonju Won clan (원주 원씨)
Lady, of the Haepyeong Yun clan (해평 윤씨)
Crown Prince Hyomyeong
Kim Dal-haeng (김달행)
Kim I-jung (김이중)
Lady, of the Hansan Yi clan (한산 이씨) (Note: Daughter of Yi Jib (이집) and younger sister of Internal Princess Consort Hansan; see above.)
Kim Jo-sun, Internal Prince Yeongan (영안부원군 김조순)
Shin Sa-jeok (신사적)
Lady, of the Pyongsan Shin clan (평산 신씨)
Queen Sunwon, of the (new) Andong Kim clan (순원왕후 신 안동 김씨)
Shim Gu (심구)
Shim Geon-ji (심건지)
Internal Princess Consort Cheongyang, of the Cheongsong Shim clan (청양부부인 청송 심씨)
Lady, of the Jeonju Yi clan (전주 이씨)

== In popular culture ==
- Portrayed by Park Bo-gum in the 2016 KBS2 TV series Love in the Moonlight.
- Portrayed by Kim Min-jae in the 2018 film Fengshui.

== See also ==
- History of Korea
- Styles and titles in Joseon
- Politics of Joseon
- Political factions of Joseon
