= Sunjo of Joseon =

King of Joseon from 1800 to 1834

Sunjo
- Emperor of Korea (posthumously)
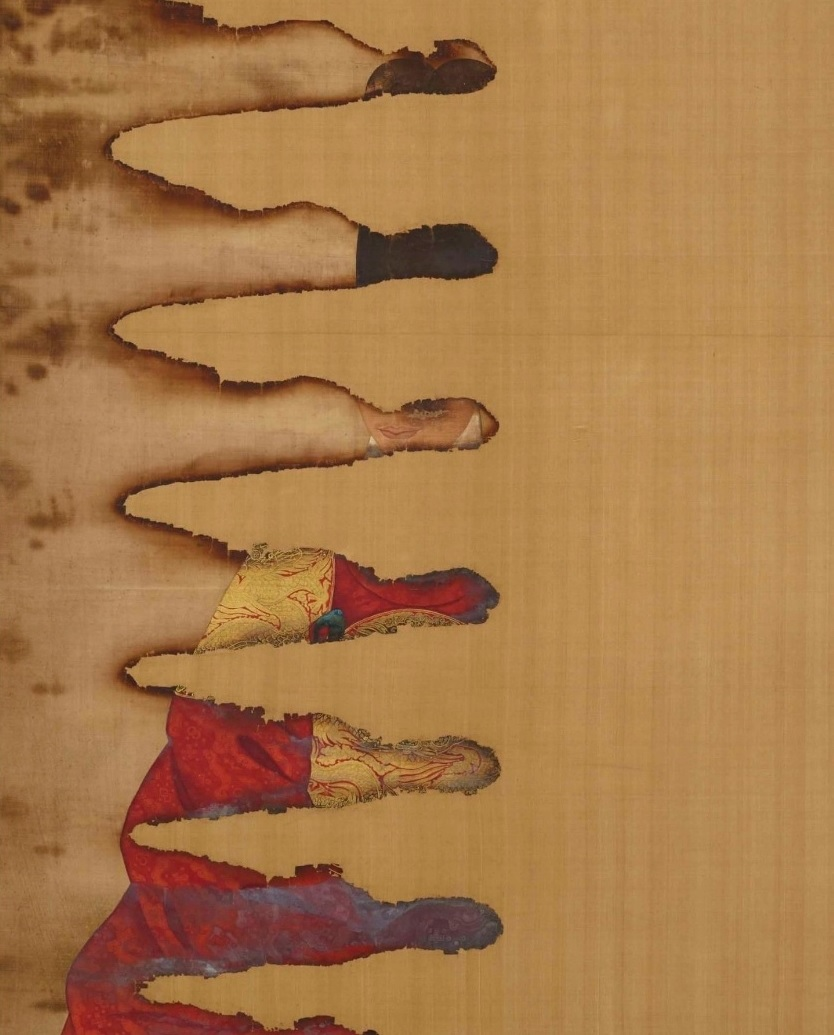
- State portrait, which was heavily damaged in the 1954 Busan fire

King of Joseon
- Reign: 18 August 1800 – 13 December 1834
- Enthronement: 23 August 1800; Injeongjeon, Changdeokgung
- Predecessor: Jeongjo
- Successor: Heonjong
- Regent: Grand Queen Dowager Yesun (1800–1804); Crown Prince Yeong (1827–1830)

Crown Prince of Joseon
- Tenure: 25 January – 18 August 1800
- Predecessor: Crown Prince Yang
- Successor: Crown Prince Yeong
- Born: 29 July 1790; Jipbokheon, Changgyeonggung, Hanseong, Joseon
- Died: 13 December 1834 (aged 44); Hoesangjeon, Gyeonghuigung, Hanseong, Joseon
- Burial: Illeung, Seoul, South Korea
- Spouse: Queen Sunwon (m. 1802)
- Issue Detail: Crown Prince Hyomyeong; Princess Myeongon; Princess Yeongon; Princess Bokon; Princess Deokon; Cheoljong of Joseon (adopted)
Names
- Yi Hong (이홍; 李玜)
Era dates
- Adopted the era name of the Qing dynasty (Note: Gagyeong (Jiaqing) (가경; 嘉慶): 1800–1820 Dogwang (Daoguang) (도광; 道光): 1821–1834)
Regnal name
- Yeondeok Hyeondo Gyeongin Sunhui Cheseong Eungmyeong Heumgwang Seokgyeong Gyecheon Baekgeuk Yungwon Donhyu Uihaeng Soryun Huihwa Junryeol Daejung Jijeong Honghun Cheolmo Geonsi Taehyeong Changun Honggi Gomyeong Bakhu Ganggeon Sujeong Gyesun Suryeong Geongong Yubeom (연덕현도경인순희체성응명흠광석경계천배극융원돈휴의행소륜희화준렬대중지정홍훈철모건시태형창운홍기고명박후강건수정계순수력건공유범; 淵德顯道景仁純禧體聖凝命欽光錫慶繼天配極隆元敦休懿行昭倫熙化浚烈大中至正洪勳哲謨乾始泰亨昌運弘基高明博厚剛健粹精啓純垂曆建功裕範) (Note: Known as honorific name (존호; 尊號) in the Sinosphere, its closest equivalent in the English-speaking world is the regnal name.)
Posthumous name
- Joseon: Great King Seongak Munan Mujeong Yeonggyeong Seonghyo (선각문안무정영경성효대왕; 宣恪文安武靖英敬成孝大王); Korean Empire: Emperor Munan Mujeong Yeonggyeong Seonghyo Suk (문안무정영경성효숙황제; 文安武靖英敬成孝肅皇帝) (Note: The posthumous name bestowed by China was notably omitted as a sign of the country's "independence".); Qing dynasty: Seongak (선각; 宣恪)
Temple name
- Sunjong (순종; 純宗) → Sunjo (순조; 純祖) (Note: Conferred in 1834 and 1857, respectively.)
- Clan: Jeonju Yi
- Dynasty: Yi
- Father: King Jeongjo
- Mother: Concubine Su (biological); Queen Hyoui (adoptive)
- Religion: Confucianism (Neo-Confucianism)
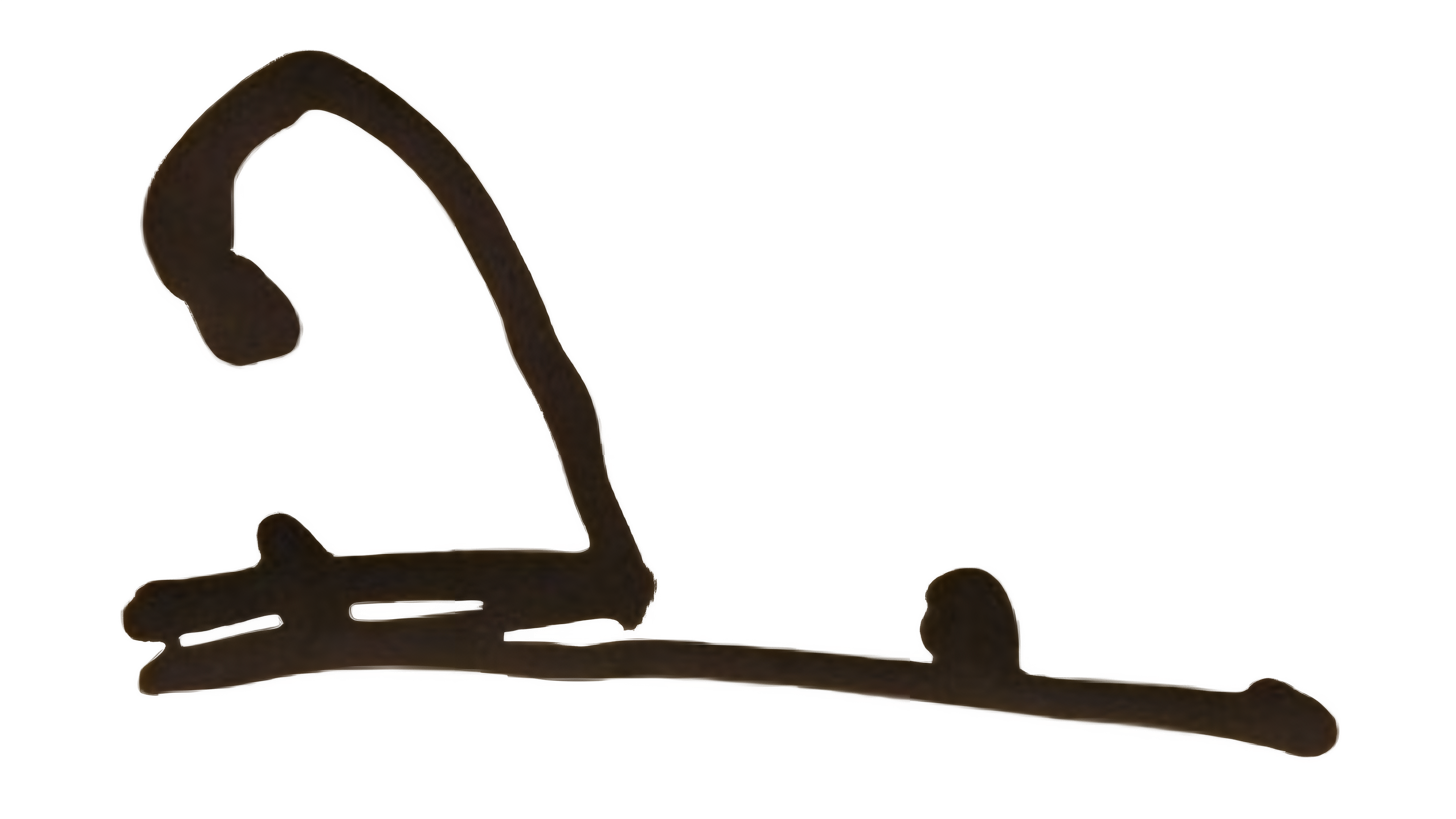
- Signature

Korean name
- Hangul: 순조
- Hanja: 純祖
- Lit.: "Genuine Progenitor"
- RR: Sunjo
- MR: Sunjo

Art name
- Hangul: 순재
- Hanja: 純齋
- RR: Sunjae
- MR: Sunjae

Courtesy name
- Hangul: 공보
- Hanja: 公寶
- RR: Gongbo
- MR: Kongbo

Sunjo (Korean: 순조; Hanja: 純祖; 29 July 1790 – 13 December 1834), (Note: In the Korean calendar (lunisolar), he was born on the 18th day of the 6th lunar month and died on the 13th day of the 11th lunar month.) personal name Yi Hong, was the 23rd monarch of the Joseon. He acceded to the throne at the age of 10, upon the death of his father, King Jeongjo. His reign was marked by the persecution of Catholics and his failed attempts at reforms that resulted in riots, notably Hong Kyŏngnae's Rebellion. Following the establishment of the Korean Empire, he was honored as Emperor Suk.

== Biography ==
In 1802, aged 12, King Sunjo married Lady Kim (posthumously Queen Sunwon), daughter of Kim Jo-sun, who was a leader of the Andong Kim clan.

Since he ascended to the throne at a young age, Queen Dowager Yesun, the second wife of his great-grandfather King Yeongjo, ruled as regent, which allowed her to wield power over state affairs. Queen Dowager Yesun's influence was to such extent that during Sunjo's reign, the status of Lady Hyegyŏng, the biological grandmother of Sunjo, became a point of contention. During Jeongjo's reign, Lady Hyegyŏng was treated with respect and as the mother of King Jeongjo despite the fact that Lady Hyegyŏng was the wife of Crown Prince Sado, who had been executed during Yeongjo's reign, which greatly affected Lady Hyegyŏng's status. Following Sunjo's ascension, her status was lowered and his efforts to reverse this later in his reign were unsuccessful.

Despite Sunjo's efforts to reform politics, the fundamental principles of governing deteriorated. The state examination became disordered and corruption in the government administration prevailed. This resulted in disorder in society and various riots broke out among the people, including the rebellion by Hong Kyŏngnae in 1812. The oppression against Catholicism began in earnest during this period.

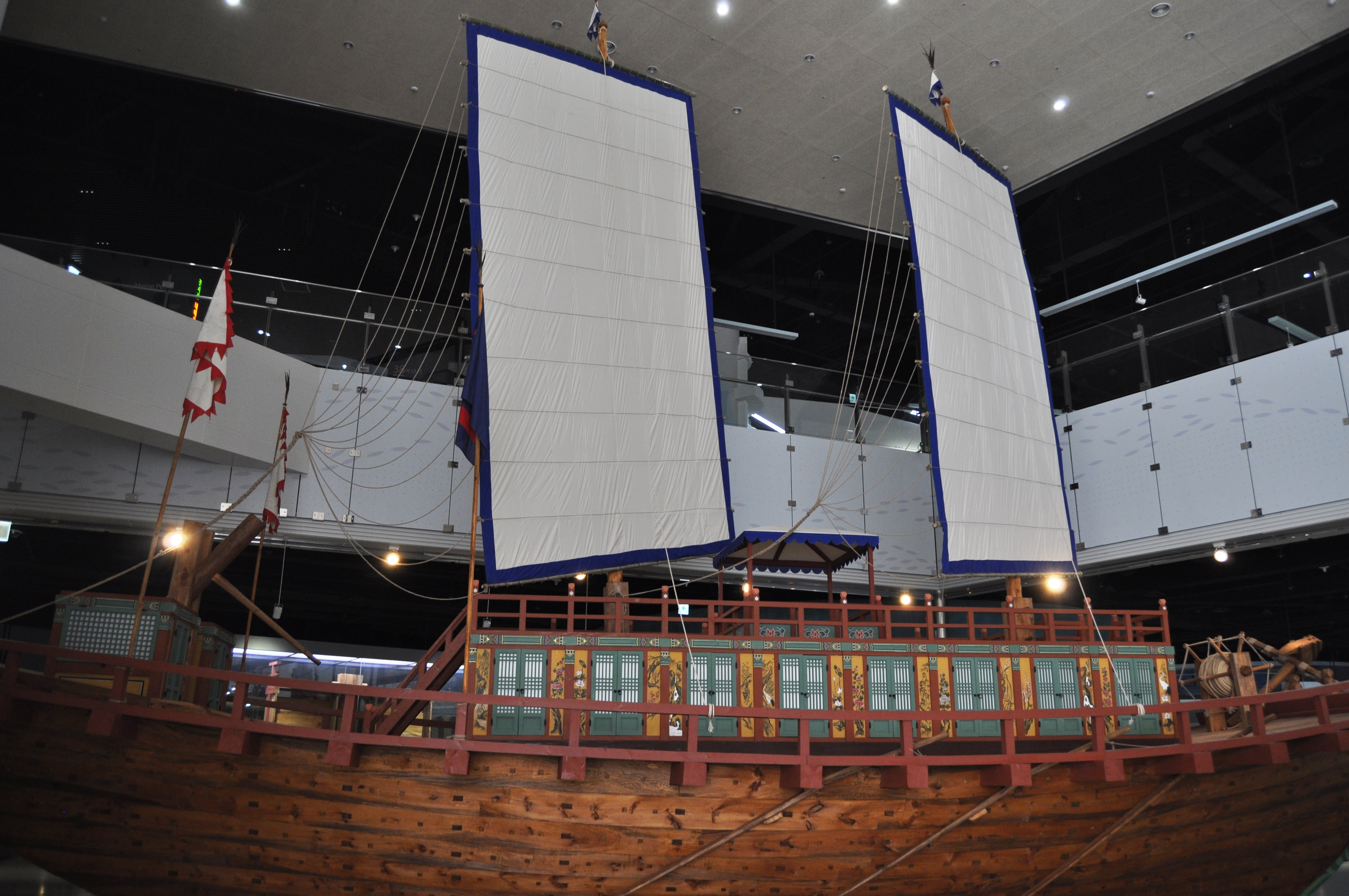
Diplomatic vessel

In 1811, the last diplomatic envoys were sent by Joseon to Japan. Based on records of that trip, a reconstruction of the diplomatic vessel has been made for the National Maritime Museum of Korea.

King Sunjo died at the age of 44, after reigning for 34 years. He was first buried next to Jangneung, the tomb of King Injo and Queen Inryeol in Paju, but was later moved to Seoul as the feng shui of the old site was deemed to be unfavorable.

== Family ==
- Father: King Jeongjo (정조대왕; 28 October 1752 – 18 August 1800)
  - Biological grandfather: King Jangjo (장조대왕; 13 February 1735 – 12 July 1762)
  - Adoptive grandfather: King Jinjong (진종대왕; 4 April 1719 – 16 December 1728)
  - Biological grandmother: Queen Heongyeong (헌경왕후), of the Pungsan Hong clan (풍산 홍씨; 6 August 1735 – 1 January 1816)
  - Adoptive grandmother: Queen Hyosun (효순왕후), of the Pungyang Jo clan (풍양 조씨; 8 January 1716 – 31 December 1751)
- Biological mother: Concubine Su (수빈), of the Bannam Park clan (반남 박씨; 1 June 1770 – 6 February 1823)
  - Grandfather: Park Jun-won (박준원; 1739–1807)
  - Grandmother: Lady, of the Wonju Won clan (원주 원씨; 1740–1783)
- Adoptive mother: Queen Hyoui (효의왕후), of the Cheongpung Kim clan (청풍 김씨; 25 December 1753 – 29 March 1821)

Consort(s) and their respective issue

- Queen Sunwon (순원왕후), of the (new) Andong Kim clan (신 안동 김씨; 8 June 1789 – 21 September 1857)
  - Yi Yeong (이영), Crown Prince Hyomyeong (효명세자; 18 September 1809 – 25 June 1830), first son
  - Princess Myeongon (명온공주; 9 November 1810 – 10 July 1832), first daughter
  - Princess Bokon (복온공주; 24 November 1818 – 10 June 1832), third daughter
  - Unnamed son (23 February – 26 May 1820)
  - Princess Deokon (덕온공주; 27 July 1822 – 9 July 1844), fourth daughter
  - Yi Byeon (이변), King Cheoljong (철종대왕; 25 July 1831 – 16 January 1864), adopted son
- Sugui (숙의), of the Miryang Park clan (밀양 박씨; ? – 24 July 1854)
  - Princess Yeongon (영온옹주; 19 November 1817 – 10 May 1829), second daughter

== Ancestry ==
Ancestors of Sunjo of Joseon

King Sukjong (숙종대왕)
King Yeongjo (영조대왕)
Concubine Suk, of the Haeju Choe clan (숙빈 해주 최씨)
King Jangjo (장조대왕)
Yi Yu-beon (이유번)
Concubine Yeong, of the Jeonui Yi clan (영빈 전의 이씨)
Lady, of the Hanyang Kim clan (한양 김씨)
King Jeongjo (정조대왕)
Hong Hyeon-bo (홍현보)
Hong Bong-han, Internal Prince Yeongpung (영풍부원군 홍봉한)
Lady, of the Pungcheon Im clan (풍천 임씨)
Queen Heongyeong, of the Pungsan Hong clan (헌경왕후 풍산 홍씨)
Yi Jib (이집)
Internal Princess Consort Hansan, of the Hansan Yi clan (한산부부인 한산 이씨)
Lady, of the Gigye Yu clan (기계 유씨)
King Sunjo
Park Pil-ri (박필리)
Park Sa-seok (박사석)
Park Jun-won (박준원)
Yu Su-gi (유수기)
Lady, of the Gigye Yu clan (기계 유씨)
Concubine Su, of the Bannam Park clan (수빈 반남 박씨)
Won Myeong-gu (원명구)
Won Gyeong-yu (원경유)
Lady, of the Wonju Won clan (원주 원씨)
Lady, of the Haepyeong Yun clan (해평 윤씨)

== In popular culture ==
- Portrayed by Kim Seung-soo in the 2016 KBS2 TV series Love in the Moonlight.

== See also ==
- History of Korea
- List of monarchs of Korea
- Styles and titles in Joseon

== Notes ==
Sunjo of Joseon House of Yi Born: 29 July 1790 Died: 13 December 1834
Royal titles
Preceded by Jeongjo	King of Joseon; 18 August 1800 – 13 December 1834	Succeeded by Heonjong
