= Queen Jeongsun =

Queen of Joseon from 1759 to 1776

Queen Jeongsun 정순왕후 貞純王后

Grand queen dowager of Joseon
- Tenure: 1800 – 11 February 1805
- Predecessor: Grand Queen Dowager Hyesun
- Successor: Grand Queen Dowager Myeonggyeong

Queen regent of Joseon
- Regency: 1800–1803
- Predecessor: Queen Insun
- Successor: Queen Sunwon

Queen dowager of Joseon
- Tenure: 22 April 1776 – 1800
- Predecessor: Queen Dowager Gyeongsun
- Successor: Queen Dowager Kim

Queen consort of Joseon
- Tenure: 22 June 1759 – 22 April 1776
- Predecessor: Queen Jeongseong
- Successor: Queen Hyoui
- Born: 2 December 1745; Yeoju, Gyeonggi Province, Joseon
- Died: 11 February 1805 (aged 59); Gyeongbok Hall, Changdeokgung, Joseon
- Burial: Wonreung
- Spouse: Yi Geum, King Yeongjo (m. 1759; died 1776)
Posthumous name
- 예순성철장희혜휘익렬명선수경광헌융인정현소숙정헌정순왕후
- House: Gyeongju Kim
- Father: Kim Han-gu
- Mother: Internal Princess Consort Wonpung of the Wonju Won clan

Queen Jeongsun (Korean: 정순왕후 김씨; 2 December 1745 – 11 February 1805 (Note: In Lunar Calendar, the Queen was born on 10 November 1745 and died on 12 January 1805)), of the Gyeongju Kim clan, was a posthumous name bestowed to the wife and second queen consort of Yi Geum, King Yeongjo, the 21st Joseon monarch. She was queen consort of Joseon from 1759 until her husband's death in 1776, after which she was honoured as Queen Dowager Yesun (예순왕대비) during the reign of her step-grandson Yi San, King Jeongjo and as Grand Queen Dowager Yesun (예순대왕대비) during the reign of her step great-grandson Yi Gong, King Sunjo.

== Biography ==
=== Early life ===
On 2 December 1745, Lady Kim was born to Kim Han-gu of the Gyeongju Kim clan and Lady Won of the Wonju Won clan. She was born in the wealthy sector of the current Seosan, South Chungcheong Province during the reign of King Yeongjo, her future husband. Her hometown was Yeoju, Gyeonggi Province, and she had two older brothers.

Through her 5th great-grandfather, Lady Kim was a 25th great-granddaughter of King Gyeongsun of Silla and Princess Nakrang through their second son, Kim Eun-yeol. Making her be distantly related to Queen Jeongan, who was the wife of King Jeongjong, the second King of Joseon, as they shared Kim Jeong-gu (김정구, 金正矩; 973–1057) as their last common ancestor; who was the grandson of Kim Eun-yeol.

Through her 5th great-grandmother, she was an 8th great-granddaughter of Yi Je, Grand Prince Yangnyeong who was the eldest son of Queen Wongyeong and King Taejo, and the older brother to King Sejong.

=== Marriage and becoming queen ===
After the death of Queen Jeongseong in 1757, King Yeongjo held bridal selections to choose his second queen. His father had banned former concubines from becoming queen, so King Yeongjo could not elevate one of his concubines to queenship, as many former kings had done.

On 9 June 1759, Queen Jeongsun was chosen as queen. During the bridal selections, Yeongjo allegedly asked the candidates what the deepest thing in the world was. Some cited the mountains, the sea, or a parent's love, but she cited the human heart, capturing his attention on her wisdom. When asked about the most beautiful flower, she answered, "The cotton flower is the most beautiful flower, although it does not exude fashion and scent, but it is the most beautiful flower that warms the people by weaving thread."

On 22 June 1759, Queen Jeongsun formally married King Yeongjo at Changgyeonggung. This marriage was considered the oldest marriage in Joseon dynasty history as Yeongjo was 64 years old, and the Queen was 13 years old at the time of the marriage. She was also 10 years younger than her husband's son and heir, Crown Prince Sado, and his daughter-in-law, Lady Hyegyŏng. As well as being 7 years older than his grandson, Grand Heir Yi San.

Queen Jeongsun's father was given the royal title of "Internal Prince Oheung" (오흥부원군; 鰲興府院君), and her mother was given the royal title "Internal Princess Consort Wonpung" (원풍부부인; 原豊府夫人).

The Queen was known to be a little assertive towards her husband. When it had come to get measured for clothing, the palace maid had politely asked the King to turn his back. Yet, she also asked her husband in a decisive tone saying, "Can you turn around?".

She and her husband shared a deep love for one another, but despite that, they produced no princes or princesses. There was no record of the young queen bearing children, or having a miscarriage.

Crown Prince Sado died in 1762 and his sister, Yi Yong-wan, Princess Hwawan, became protectress of Sado's son, Yi San. Yeongjo died on 22 April 1776 and Yi San ascended to the throne as the 22nd Joseon monarch (temple name: Jeongjo).

As widow of a king, the 31-year-old Queen Consort was honoured as Queen Dowager Yesun. But Hong Bong-han, Jeongjo's maternal grandfather, and Jeong Hu-gyeom, Princess Hwawan's adoptive son, protested this decision.

Yesun's older brother, Kim Gwi-ju, advised his sister to wait for the right moment, but Jeongjo acted first. He dismissed Hong Bong-han and Jeong Hu-gyeom from office. However, Jeongjo later exiled Kim Gwi-ju to Heuksan Island on the grounds of disrespect towards the King's mother, Lady Hyegyŏng, but the real reason was because of Kim Gwi-ju's involvement with Hong Bong-han's dismissal during Yeongjo's reign. This action caused unspoken tension and extreme confrontations between Yesun and Jeongjo.

=== Regency ===
In 1800, Jeongjo died of an abscess on his back at age 49. He died 15 days after first being treated. His last words were 'Sujeongjeon Hall,' which was the residence of Yesun, giving rise to speculation to this day that Queen Dowager poisoned Jeongjo.

He was succeeded by his 10-year-old son, Yi Gong (temple name: King Sunjo) and Yesun was raised to the status of Grand Queen Dowager. As the most senior-generation royal family member, Yesun acted as regent for the young king and exerted power until she voluntarily gave it up in 1803. She departed from the policy of the late King, enforcing the Catholic Persecution of 1801 and favoring the Noron Byeokpa faction.

Yesun had purged a large number of conflicting Soron sects, executed Jeongjo's half-brother and maternal uncle, Prince Euneon and Hong Nak-im, abolished Jang Yong-young established by Jeongjo, and massively defeated the Catholic Church that Jeongjo had tolerated. It was repressed and expelled other people and the Soron faction.

She also hired many Noron Bukpa officials, such as Kim Gwan-ju and Kim Yong-ju, whom she had struck by Jeongjo. In 1802, under Jeongjo's law, she had Kim Jo-sun's daughter, the future Queen Sunwon, became the queen consort of Sunjo, and Kim Jo-sun was sealed to Internal Prince Yeongan (永安府院君) and was resigned from her rule.

On 9 February 1804, after reaping the convergence and cleansing, when Sunjo's family was declared, most bureaucrats were purged by Kim Jo-sun, the father of Queen Sunwon, and the power of King Jeongjo. Her influence was weakened, and she had a futile last year of reign, and a year later, on 30 February 1805, she died in Gyeongbokjeon Hall at Changdeokgung Palace. She was posthumously honoured as Queen Jeongsun.

=== Death ===
Prior to their deaths, King Yeongjo had designed and built Queen Jeongseong's tomb intending to be on the right side of her mound. But the previous queen ended up alone even after death when the next king made changes.

Despite the indifferences between Jeongjo and Grand Queen Dowager Yesun, and prior to King Jeongjo’s death in 1805, the king himself was considerate of having his grandfather be buried next to the late Grand Queen Dowager within the dynastic tombs at Donggureung, the royal tomb of Wonneung (원릉; 元陵), in the city of Guri, Gyeonggi Province.

== Family ==
- Father − Kim Han-gu (김한구; 金漢耉; 23 February 1723 – 5 November 1769)
- Mother − Internal Princess Consort Wonpung of the Wonju Won clan (원풍부부인 원주 원씨; 1722–1769)

Siblings

- Older brother − Kim Gwi-ju (김귀주; 金龜柱; 1740–1786)
- Older brother − Kim In-ju (김인주; 金麟柱; 1743–?)

Consort

- Husband − Yi Geum, King Yeongjo (조선 영조; 31 October 1694 – 22 April 1776) — No issue.

== In popular culture ==
- Portrayed by Kim Yong-sun in the 1988–1989 MBC TV series The Memoirs of Lady Hyegyeong.
- Portrayed by Kim Ja-ok in the 1991 KBS1 TV series The Royal Way.
- Portrayed by Lee In-hye in the 1998 MBC TV series The King's Road.
- Portrayed by Kim Yeong-ran in the 2000 KBS2 TV series Novel: Admonitions on Governing the People
- Portrayed by Yeom Ji-yoon in the 2001 MBC TV series Hong Guk-yeong.
- Portrayed by Kim Ae-ri in the 2007 KBS TV series Conspiracy in the Court
- Portrayed by Kim Hee-jong in the 2007 CGV TV series Eight Days, Assassination Attempts against King Jeongjo.
- Portrayed by Kim Yeo-jin in the 2007–2008 MBC TV series Lee San, Wind of the Palace.
- Portrayed by Yoon Min-ju in the 2007 musical King Jeongjo
- Portrayed by Im Ji-eun in the 2008 SBS TV series Painter of the Wind.
- Portrayed by Geum Dan-bi in the 2011 SBS TV series Warrior Baek Dong-soo.
- Portrayed by Ha Seung-ri in the 2014 SBS TV series Secret Door.
- Portrayed by Han Ji-min in the 2014 film The Fatal Encounter.
- Portrayed by Seo Ye-ji in the 2015 film The Throne.
- Portrayed by Jang Hee-jin in the 2021 MBC TV series The Red Sleeve.

== Notes ==
Queen Jeongsun Gyeongju Kim clan
Royal titles
Preceded by Queen Jeongseong of the Gyeongju Kim clan	Queen consort of Joseon; 22 June 1759 – 22 April 1776	Succeeded by Queen Hyoui of the Cheongpung Kim clan
Preceded by Queen Dowager Gyeongsun (Seonui) of the Hamjong Eo clan	Queen dowager of Joseon; 22 April 1776 – 1800	Succeeded by Queen Dowager (Hyoui) of the Cheongpung Kim clan
Preceded by Grand Queen Dowager Hyesun (Inwon) of the Gyeongju Kim clan	Grand queen dowager of Joseon; 1800 – 11 February 1805	Succeeded by Grand Queen Dowager Myeonggyeong (Sunwon) of the Andong Kim clan
