= Jeongjo of Joseon =

King of Joseon from 1776 to 1800

Jeongjo
- Emperor of Korea (posthumously)
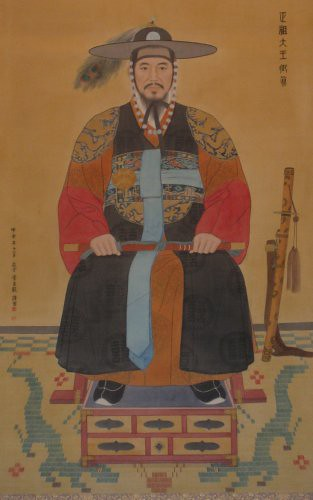
- Modern portrait in military attire, housed at the Hwaryeongjeon Shrine in Suwon, 2004 (Note: All of Jeongjo's original portraits were destroyed during the 1954 fire in Busan.)

King of Joseon
- Reign: 22 April 1776 – 18 August 1800
- Enthronement: 27 April 1776; Sungjeongjeon, Gyeonghuigung
- Predecessor: Yeongjo
- Successor: Sunjo

Regent of Joseon
- Tenure: 30 January – 22 April 1776
- Monarch: Yeongjo

Grand Heir of Joseon
- Tenure: 10 March 1759 – 22 April 1776
- Predecessor: Grand Heir Jeong
- Successor: Grand Heir Hwan
- Born: 28 October 1752; Gyeongchunjeon, Changgyeonggung, Hanseong, Joseon
- Died: 18 August 1800 (aged 47); Yeongchunheon, Changgyeonggung, Hanseong, Joseon
- Burial: Geolleung, Hwaseong, South Korea
- Spouse: Queen Hyoui (m. 1762)
- Issue Detail: Crown Prince Munhyo; Sunjo of Joseon; Princess Sukseon
Names
- Yi San (이산; 李祘) (Note: Or Yi Seong (이성); pronunciation changed in 1796.)
Era dates
- Adopted the era name of the Qing dynasty (Note: Geollyung (Qianlong) (건륭; 乾隆): 1776–1795 Gagyeong (Jiaqing) (가경; 嘉慶): 1796–1800)
Regnal name
- Gyeongcheon Myeongdo Hongdeok Hyeonmu (경천명도홍덕현모; 敬天明道洪德顯謨) (Note: Known as honorific name (존호; 尊號) in the Sinosphere, its closest equivalent in the English-speaking world is the regnal name.)
Posthumous name
- Joseon: Great King Gongseon Munseong Muyeol Seongin Janghyo (공선문성무열성인장효대왕; 恭宣文成武烈聖仁莊孝大王); Korean Empire: Emperor Munseong Muyeol Seongin Janghyo Seon (문성무열성인장효선황제; 文成武烈聖仁莊孝宣皇帝) (Note: The posthumous name bestowed by China was notably omitted as a sign of the country's "independence".); Qing dynasty: Gongseon (공선; 恭宣)
Temple name
- Jeongjong (정종; 正宗) → Jeongjo (정조; 正祖) (Note: Conferred in 1800 and 1899, respectively.)
- Clan: Jeonju Yi
- Dynasty: Yi
- Father: King Jangjo (biological); King Jinjong (adoptive)
- Mother: Queen Heongyeong (biological); Queen Hyosun (adoptive)
- Religion: Confucianism (Neo-Confucianism)
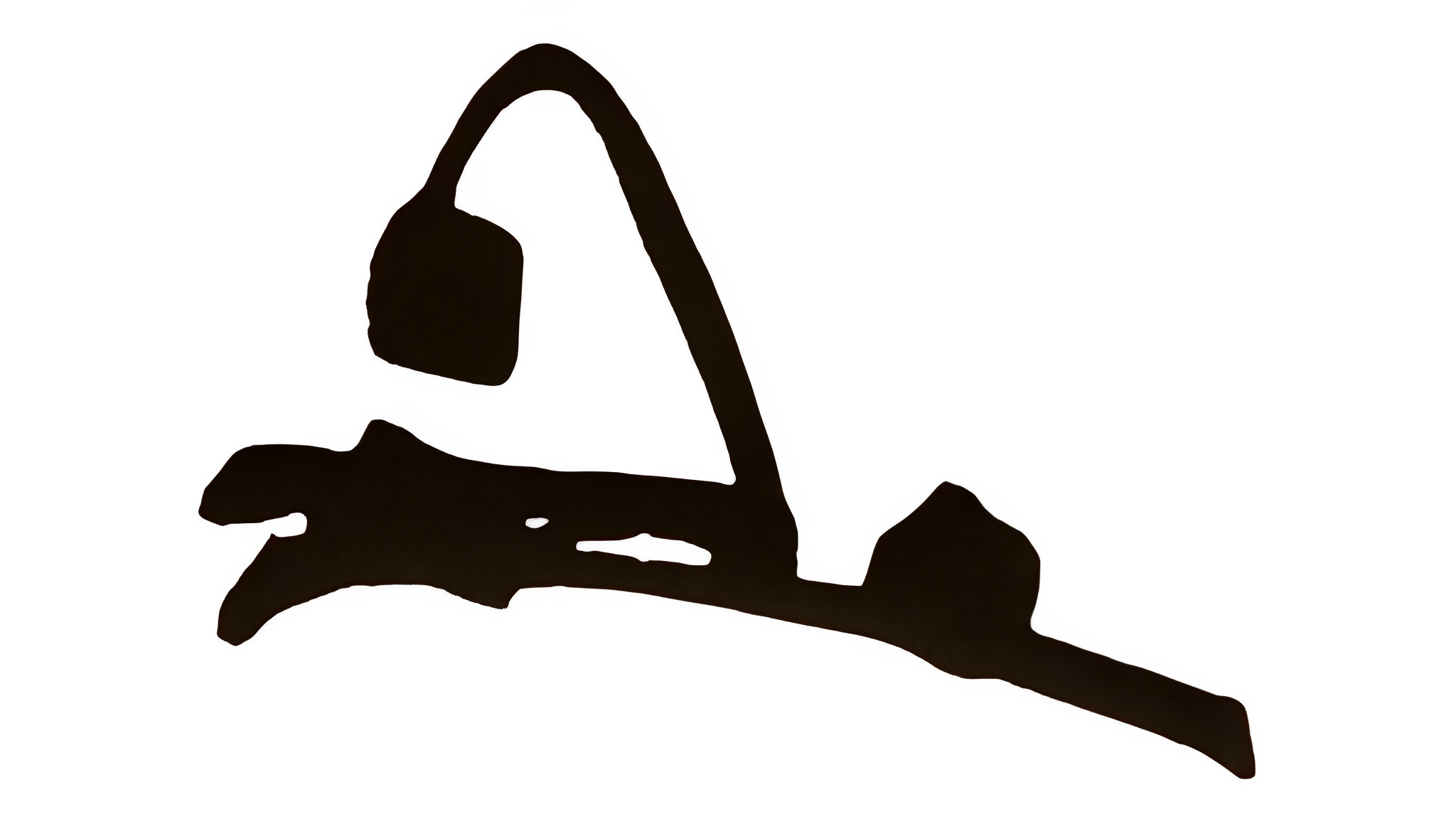
- Signature

Korean name
- Hangul: 정조
- Hanja: 正祖
- Lit.: "Righteous Progenitor"
- RR: Jeongjo
- MR: Chŏngjo

Art name
- Hangul: 홍재
- Hanja: 弘齋
- RR: Hongjae
- MR: Hongjae

Courtesy name
- Hangul: 형운
- Hanja: 亨運
- RR: Hyeongun
- MR: Hyŏngun

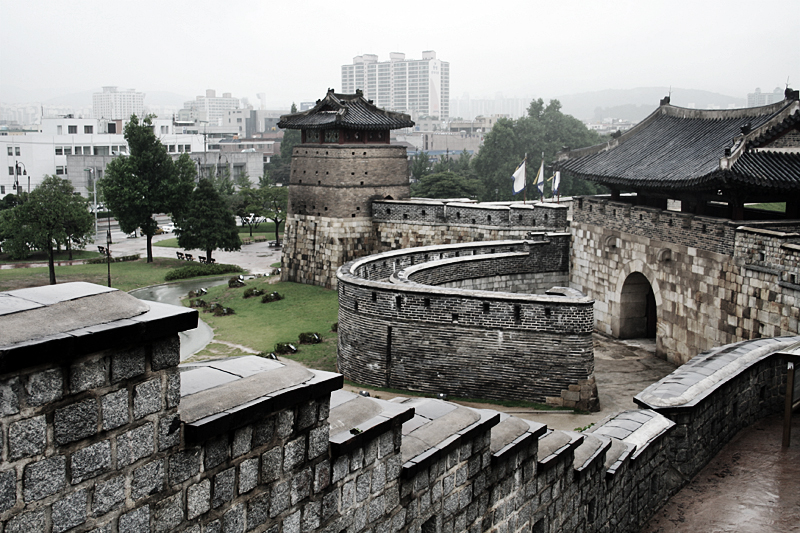
Hwaseong Fortress

Jeongjo (Korean: 정조; Hanja: 正祖; 28 October 1752 – 18 August 1800), (Note: In the Korean calendar (lunisolar), he was born on the 22nd day of the 9th lunar month and died on the 28th day of the 6th lunar month.) personal name Yi San, sometimes known as Jeongjo the Great, was the 22nd monarch of Joseon. He was the second son of the ill-fated Crown Prince Sado and Lady Hyegyŏng, and acceded to the throne upon the death of his grandfather, King Yeongjo. Despite the persistence of factional struggles, his reign marked a cultural and political renaissance, and is considered one of the high points of the Joseon period. Today, he is generally regarded to be among the greatest leaders in Korean history. Following the establishment of the Korean Empire, he was honored as Emperor Seon.

Jeongjo continued his grandfather's Tangpyeong policy (but took on a different approach, prioritizing the recruitment of the most talented scholars regardless of faction), encouraged the publication of literary collections and legal codes, established the Jangyongyeong Guard and the Kyujanggak Royal Library, and ordered the construction of Hwaseong Fortress. However, his appointment of Hong Guk-yeong left behind the malpractice of having state affairs swayed by close retainers. Furthermore, just before his death, worried about his young heir, he chose the daughter of Kim Jo-sun of the Andong Kim clan as crown princess; yet this turned out to be a self-defeating move that tilted power to one side and became the backdrop for the era of sedo politics (세도정치; 勢道政治; lit. ''power politics'').

== Biography ==
=== Early life ===
He was the son of Crown Prince Sado and Lady Hyegyŏng (who wrote the Memoirs of Lady Hyegyŏng, which details her life and offers advice and explanations for her grandson about the deaths of his grandfather and many maternal relatives). His elder brother Crown Prince Uiso died in infancy. His mother Lady Hyegyŏng's collection of memoirs serves as a significant source of historical information on the political happenings during the reigns of King Yeongjo (her father-in-law), King Jeongjo (her son), and King Sunjo (her grandson).

In 1762, Crown Prince Sado was executed (by imprisonment in a rice chest) by King Yeongjo after long conflicts and Sado's years of mental illness. On 21 February 1764, Yi San became the adoptive son of Crown Prince Hyojang and Princess Consort Hyosun by the order of King Yeongjo. Crown Prince Hyojang was the elder half-brother of his father, Crown Prince Sado. Crown Prince Hyojang though, had died during his childhood. King Yeongjo made Yi San a part of Hyojang's family because he was concerned that Yi San, who was Sado's son and successor, would be opposed. The Noron faction protested Yi San's legitimacy as the royal successor under the claim that Yi San was the 'Son of a prisoner' or 'Son of a madman' and thus ineligible to succeed the throne. This was a major source of vexation for King Yeongjo for an extended period.

After 1762 to 1777, some members of Noron attempted to depose Jeongjo for his relation to Crown Prince Sado and open the path of succession for his half-brothers Prince Eunjeon, Prince Euneon and, Prince Eunshin. His grand uncle Hong In-han and Jeong Hu-gyeom, adopted son of Princess Hwawan, were amongst them.

When he was the Crown Prince, King Jeongjo met Hong Guk-yeong (홍국영; 洪國榮), a controversial politician who first strongly supported Jeongjo's accession and toiled to improve the king's power, but ended up being expelled because of his desire and ambition for power. Another helper was Kim Jong-su (김종수; 金鍾秀), despite being a member of Noron.

In 1775, one year before King Yeongjo's death, King Jeongjo was appointed regent. However, King Yeongjo did not give him any military power.

=== Reign ===
Before Yeongjo died, Jeongjo had his coronation in Gyeonghuigung on 10 March 1776. After his coronation, Jeongjo chose his spouse. The first thing that Jeongjo said to his officials was that he was the son of Jangjo (temple name of Crown Prince Sado) who was executed by the former king.

Jeongjo tried to empathize with his people. During his second year of reign, a great drought came. During the drought, Jeongjo was nervous just like the people and did a rainmaking ritual for his people. He also was deeply concerned about the continuing outbreaks of measles epidemics, and among other things supplied free public medicines in an attempt curb the death rates.

Concerned about political factions, Jeongjo continued his grandfather's policy of Tangpyeong (political harmony policy) in an attempt to balance political factions. By this, he tried to get rid of the parties which caused his father's death.

From the first day of the reign, Jeongjo spent much of his reign trying to clear his father's name. One of the first things Jeongjo said following his ascension to the throne of Joseon was declaring that he was the son of Crown Prince Sado. He also moved the court to the city of Suwon to be closer to his father's grave. He built Hwaseong Fortress to guard the tomb. It is now a UNESCO World Heritage Site.

Jeongjo was always threatened by some of his officials who were against his reign. He was able to overcome these challenges with the help of Hong Guk-yeong and others.

During his accession, he also issued a royal decree that his mother, Lady Hyegyŏng, be a Dowager Queen since his father, her husband, was supposed to be the King before him. Thus, she became the Queen Dowager, the widow of Jangjo. From then on, King Jeongjo experienced many turbulent periods, but overcame them with the aid of Hong Guk-yeong, Kim Chong-su.

In 1776, Hong Sang-beom, Hong Kye-neung and other some member of Noron unsuccessfully attempted to stage a military coup d'état and assassinate him. Jeongjo fought the rebels who were secretly in royal palace and personally arrested his assassins. Jeongjo executed Hong Sang-beom, Hong Kye-neung, and another some member of Norons, and put to death Prince Eunjeon, Hong In-han, and Chung Hu-kyom.

Jeongjo tried to impeach Hong Guk-yeong in an attempt to stop the concentration of political power in single civil family but the impeachment failed.

In 1785 he established Changyongyeong (장용영; 壯勇營) as the King's royal bodyguards. Jeongjo had started selecting officers by competitive examination since 1782 to recruit them into the Changyongyeong unit, to replace the Naekeunwe (corps of Joseon royal bodyguards created by Taejong of Joseon in 1407), which he no longer trusted.

=== Renaissance ===
King Jeongjo led the renaissance of Joseon, but was initially busy continuing the policy of Yeongjo's Tangpyeong ("Magnificent Harmony"; 蕩平, 탕평) policy of political reconciliation between the parties. He tried to control the politics of the whole nation to advance and further national progress.

He made various reforms throughout his reign, notably establishing Kyujanggak (규장각), a royal library. The primary purpose of Kyujanggak was to improve the cultural and political stance of Joseon and to recruit gifted officers to help run the nation. Jeongjo also spearheaded bold new social initiatives, including opening government positions to those who were previously barred because of their social status.

He cultivated knowledge of humanities and philosophy (Neo-Confucianism). He was known to be studious and well-read. Among the King's entourage, one that had a great influence and became both a great teacher and father figure for him was Kim Jong-su. Jeongjo also had the support of the many Silhak scholars who favored regal power over the parties, including scholars Chŏng Yagyong, Pak Chiwŏn, Pak Chega and Yu Deuk-gong. His reign also saw the further growth and development of Joseon's popular culture.

Jeongjo favored members of the Soron and Namin party over those of the powerful Noron faction, as a way to establish checks and balances and strengthen royal authority.

He was opposed to new fashions in the composition style of Korean writing and personally taught composition to some intellectuals and bureaucrats called Munchebanjong (문체반정 文體反正 – literary criticism/reform).

In 1791, Jeongjo got a report from Ch'ae Chegong that the people were having difficulty surviving by selling the fruit of their labor. Jeongjo then established the new law of Shinhae Tonggong (free trade law), which allowed anyone to sell their goods at the market. This abolished the previous law of Gumnanjeonguoun, which reserved this right exclusively to members of merchant groups in the capital.

=== Death ===
In his final years, Jeongjo arranged for the marriage of his second son and successor Sunjo of Joseon to Lady Kim of the Andong clan, daughter of Kim Jo-sun, but did not live to see his son's marriage. In 1800, Jeongjo died suddenly under uncertain circumstances at the age of 47, without seeing much of his life's work come to fruition under his son, Sunjo. There are many books regarding the mystery behind his death, and speculation as to the cause of his death continues even today.

He is buried with his wife, Queen Hyoui, at the royal tomb of Geonneung (건릉; 健陵) in the city of Hwaseong.

On 7 December 1899, Jeongjo posthumously became Jeongjo Sanghwangjae.

== Family ==
- Biological father: King Jangjo (장조대왕; 13 February 1735 – 12 July 1762)
  - Grandfather: King Yeongjo (영조대왕; 31 October 1694 – 22 April 1776)
  - Biological grandmother: Concubine Yeong (영빈), of the Jeonui Yi clan (전의 이씨; 5 August 1696 – 12 August 1764)
  - Adoptive grandmother: Queen Jeongseong (정성왕후), of the Daegu Seo clan (대구 서씨; 2 January 1693 – 23 March 1757)
  - Step-grandmother: Queen Jeongsun (정순왕후), of the Gyeongju Kim clan (경주 김씨; 2 December 1745 – 11 February 1805)
- Adoptive father: King Jinjong (진종대왕; 4 April 1719 – 16 December 1728)
- Biological mother: Queen Heongyeong (헌경왕후), of the Pungsan Hong clan (풍산 홍씨; 6 August 1735 – 1 January 1816)
  - Grandfather: Hong Bong-han (홍봉한), Internal Prince Yeongpung (영풍부원군; 1713–1778)
  - Grandmother: Internal Princess Consort Hansan (한산부부인), of the Hansan Yi clan (한산 이씨; 1713–1755)
- Adoptive mother: Queen Hyosun (효순왕후), of the Pungyang Jo clan (풍양 조씨; 8 January 1716 – 31 December 1751)

Consort(s) and their respective issue

- Queen Hyoui (효의왕후), of the Cheongpung Kim clan (청풍 김씨; 25 December 1753 – 29 March 1821)
- Concubine Su (수빈), of the Bannam Park clan (반남 박씨; 1 June 1770 – 6 February 1823)
  - Yi Hong (이홍), King Sunjo (순조대왕; 29 July 1790 – 13 December 1834), second son
  - Princess Sukseon (숙선옹주; 11 April 1793 – 20 July 1836), first daughter
- Concubine Ui (의빈), of the Changnyeong Seong clan (창녕 성씨; 6 August 1753 – 4 November 1786), given name Deok-im (덕임)
  - Miscarriage (1780)
  - Miscarriage (1781)
  - Yi Yang (이양), Crown Prince Munhyo (문효세자; 13 October 1782 – 6 June 1786), first son
  - Unnamed daughter (1784)
  - Unborn child (1786) (Note: Died in utero as a result of the mother's death during the last month of pregnancy.)
- Concubine Won (원빈), of the Pungsan Hong clan (경주 홍씨; 22 June 1766 – 9 June 1779)
- Concubine Hwa (화빈), of the Namwon Yun clan (남원 윤씨; 19 May 1765 – 1 February 1824)

== Ancestry ==
Ancestors of Jeongjo of Joseon

King Hyeonjong (현종대왕)
King Sukjong (숙종대왕)
Queen Myeongseong, of the Cheongpung Kim clan (명성왕후 청풍 김씨)
King Yeongjo (영조대왕)
Choe Hyo-won (최효원)
Concubine Suk, of the Haeju Choe clan (숙빈 해주 최씨)
Lady, of the Namyang Hong clan (남양 홍씨)
King Jangjo (장조대왕)
Yi Yeong-im (이영임)
Yi Yu-beon (이유번)
Concubine Yeong, of the Jeonui Yi clan (영빈 전의 이씨)
Kim U-jong (김우종)
Lady, of the Hanyang Kim clan (한양 김씨)
Lady, of the Jeonju Yi clan (전주 이씨)
King Jeongjo
Hong Jung-gi (홍중기)
Hong Hyeon-bo (홍현보)
Lady, of the Jeonju Yi clan (전주 이씨)
Hong Bong-han, Internal Prince Yeongpung (영풍부원군 홍봉한)
Im Bang (임방)
Lady, of the Pungcheon Im clan (풍천 임씨)
Queen Heongyeong, of the Pungsan Hong clan (헌경왕후 풍산 홍씨)
Yi Jib (이집)
Internal Princess Consort Hansan, of the Hansan Yi clan (한산부부인 한산 이씨)
Yu Heon (유헌)
Lady, of the Gigye Yu clan (기계 유씨)

== In popular culture ==
- Portrayed by Kim Yong-gun in the 1989 MBC TV series 500 Years of Joseon: Pa Mun.
- Portrayed by Jung Jae-gon in the 2001 MBC TV series Hong Guk Young.
- Portrayed by Lee Seo-jin and Park Ji-bin in the 2007 MBC TV series Lee San, Wind of the Palace.
- Portrayed by Ahn Nae-sang in the 2007 KBS2 TV series Conspiracy in the Court.
- Portrayed by Kim Sang-joong and Park Gun-woo in the 2007 CGV TV series Eight Days, Assassination Attempts against King Jeongjo.
- Portrayed by Bae Soo-bin in the 2008 SBS TV series Painter of the Wind.
- Portrayed by Han Myeong-goo in the 2008 film Portrait of a Beauty.
- Portrayed by Jo Sung-ha in the 2010 KBS2 TV series Sungkyunkwan Scandal.
- Portrayed by Hong Jong-hyun in the 2011 SBS TV series Warrior Baek Dong-soo.
- Portrayed by Hyun Bin and Goo Seung-hyun in the 2014 film The Fatal Encounter.
- Portrayed by Lee Je-hoon, Kim Woo-suk, and Kim Dan-yool in the 2014 SBS TV series Secret Door.
- Portrayed by Go Woo-rim in the 2015 KBS2 drama special Crimson Moon.
- Portrayed by So Ji-sub and Lee Hyo-je in the 2015 film The Throne.
- Portrayed by Lee Jun-ho and Lee Joo-won in the 2021 MBC TV series The Red Sleeve.

== See also ==
- History of Korea
- List of monarchs of Korea
- Consort kin
- Political factions of Joseon
- Styles and titles in Joseon

== Notes ==
Jeongjo of Joseon House of Yi Born: 28 October 1752 Died: 18 August 1800
Royal titles
Preceded by Yeongjo	King of Joseon; 22 April 1776 – 18 August 1800	Succeeded by Sunjo
