= Queen Hyoui =

Queen of Joseon from 1776 to 1800

Queen Hyoui 효의왕후 孝懿王后

Queen dowager of Joseon
- Tenure: 18 August 1800 – 10 April 1821
- Predecessor: Queen Dowager Yesun
- Successor: Queen Dowager Myeonggyeong

Queen consort of Joseon
- Tenure: 1776 – 18 August 1800
- Predecessor: Queen Jeongsun
- Successor: Queen Sunwon

Crown Princess of Joseon
- Tenure: 1762–1776
- Predecessor: Crown Princess Hyegyeong
- Successor: Crown Princess Jo
- Born: 25 December 1753; Gahoebang, Hanseong, Joseon
- Died: 29 March 1821 (aged 67); Jagyeong Hall, Changgyeong Palace, Hanseong, Joseon
- Burial: Geonneung
- Spouse: King Jeongjo of Joseon (m. 1762; died 1800)
Posthumous name
- 장휘예경자수효의왕후; 莊徽睿敬慈粹孝懿王后
- House: Cheongpung Kim
- Father: Kim Si-Muk
- Mother: Internal Princess Consort Dangseong of the Namyang Hong clan

Queen Hyoui (Korean: 효의왕후; Hanja: 孝懿王后; 25 December 1753 – 29 March 1821), of the Cheongpung Kim clan (청풍 김씨; 淸風 金氏), was the wife and queen consort of King Jeongjo of Joseon. In 1899, Emperor Gojong posthumously gave her the title of Hyoui, the Kind Empress (효의선황후; 孝懿宣皇后).

== Biography ==
=== Early life and marriage ===
The future queen Hyoui was born during Yeongjo's reign. She was the only daughter of Kim Si-muk and his second wife, a lady from the Namyang Hong clan.

She married Yi San, then known as the crown prince's son, in 1762 at the age of 9, on the twenty-fifth day of the second lunar month in the thirty-eighth year of King Yeongjo's reign.

It was said that the reason why Lady Kim became the wife of the young crown prince was because she came from the Cheongpung Kim clan; the clan of Queen Myeongseong who was her great-great-grand aunt. But in Lady Hyegyeong’s memoir, she stated that the real reason Lady Kim was selected was because of her father.

In the winter of 1761, Hong Bong-han had been invited by Board Minister Kim Seong-eung to celebrate his mother’s 60th birthday. When he arrived, Hong had seen Lady Kim at the party. A year later, when marriage selections for the crown Prince were being held, King Yeongjo had Hong Bong-han view the list of daughters of officials to select a match for their grandson. So when he saw the name of Kim Si-muk’s daughter, the board minister’s granddaughter, he was reminded of her “outstanding disposition” and selected Lady Kim for the process. When she came to the royal court, it was only then that her “great virtue” was seen by royal officials that prompted them to choose her.

Her younger cousin, Lady Kim, later married a younger brother, Hong Nak-ryun, of Lady Hyegyeong, which then gave her clan more royal connections.

=== Palace and political life ===
When the crown prince died in 1762, the crown princess was stated to be “overcome with grief” as she was young and because Crown Prince Sado always treated her kindly prior to his death. Lady Hyegyeong had said whenever her late husband was brought up in conversation by the crown princess, she would cry.

Princess Hwawan was later asked to be the protector of Yi San, son of Crown Prince Sado and the new crown prince, and he would be later King Jeongjo of Joseon. Around the time, Princess Hwawan was trusted by her father, so the young crown prince was thought to remain safe during the rest of Yeongjo's reign.

However, in attempt to control him, she estranged the relationship between the crown prince and crown princess (later Queen Hyoui). Her adopted son, Jeong Hu-gyeom, was involved heavily in troublesome Political factions in Joseon dynasty(between the Hidebound and Opportunist Factions). The mother and son, along with parties from some of the officials, caused the family members of Lady Hyegyeong, the mother of Jeongjo, to fall from power, which threatened the identity of Jeongjo as a crown prince.

The 22-year-old crown princess became queen consort upon her husband's accession to the throne in 1776. For many years, the king was willing to forgive Princess Hwawan as she was the favorite daughter of the late king and his aunt. Yet, since the beginning of his reign, numerous officials asked the new king to execute the princess for her acts. Eventually, Princess Hwawan lost her title, status, and power upon becoming a commoner in 1778.

The Queen did not bear King Jeongjo any children, but she adopted the sons of two of her husband's concubines, Royal Noble Consort Ui and Royal Noble Consort Su, as her own. The son of Royal Noble Consort Ui died young, but the son of Royal Noble Consort Su would eventually succeed King Jeongjo on the throne as the twenty-third king of Joseon.

The Queen had outlived her husband, who died in 1800, by 21 years and became queen dowager. She later died in Changgyeonggung, during Sunjo's reign.

== Family ==
- Father
  - Internal Prince Cheongwon, Kim Si-muk (청원부원군 김시묵; 淸原府院君 金時默; 1722–1772)
    - Grandfather - Kim Seong-eung (김성응; 金聖應; 1699–1764)
    - Grandmother - Lady Hong of the Namyang Hong clan (남양 홍씨; 南陽 洪氏); 1699–?)
- Mother
  - Step - Internal Princess Consort Uichun of the Uiryeong Nam clan (증 의춘부부인 의령 남씨; 贈 宜春府夫人 宜寧 南氏; 1720–1746); Kim Si-muk's first wife
  - Biological - Internal Princess Consort Dangseong of the Namyang Hong clan (당성부부인 남양 홍씨; 唐城府夫人 南陽 洪氏; 1728–1791)
- Siblings
  - Older half-brother - Kim Gi-dae (김기대; 金基大; 1742–1777)
  - Older brother - Kim Gi-jong (김기종; 金基種)
- Husband
  - Yi San, Jeongjo of Joseon (정조; 正祖; 28 October 1752 – 18 August 1800)
- Issue
  - Adoptive son - Yi Sun, Crown Prince Munhyo (문효세자; 文孝世子; 13 October 1782 – 6 June 1786)
  - Adoptive son - Yi Gong, Sunjo of Joseon(순조대왕; 純祖大王; 29 July 1790 – 13 December 1834)

== In popular culture ==
- Portrayed by Kim Chung in the 1989 MBC TV series 500 Years of Joseon: Pa Mun.
- Portrayed by Lee Ae-jung in the 1998 MBC TV series The King's Road.
- Portrayed by Park Eun-hye in the 2007 MBC TV series Lee San, Wind of the Palace.
- Portrayed by Lee Hyun-jung in the 2014 movie The Throne.

Queen Hyoui Cheongpung Kim clan
Royal titles
Preceded by Queen Jeongsun of the Gyeongju Kim clan	Queen consort of Joseon; 1776 – 18 August 1800	Succeeded by Queen Sunwon of the Andong Kim clan
Preceded by Queen Dowager Yesun (Jeongsun) of the Gyeongju Kim clan	Queen dowager of Joseon; 18 August 1800 – 10 April 1821	Succeeded by Queen Dowager Myeonggyeong (Sunwon) of the Andong Kim clan
