= Andong Kim clan =

Korean clan from North Gyeongsang Province

The Andong Kim clan (Korean: 안동 김씨; Hanja: 安東 金氏) refers to two Korean clans of Old Andong Kim Clan (구 안동 김씨; 舊 安東 金氏) and the New Andong Kim Clan (신 안동 김씨; 新 安東 金氏), respectively. They were prominent yangban families during Korea's Joseon Dynasty originating from Andong, North Gyeongsang province, during the Goryeo Dynasty. The clans produced many individuals who passed the gwageo examinations, along with 3 Queen Consorts during the Joseon Dynasty: Queen Sunwon, Queen Hyohyeon, and Queen Cheorin. Both clans derive from the Gyeongju Kim clan.

Family seal of the Andong Kim clan

== Type ==
=== Andong Kim clan (Old) ===
The Old Andong Kim clan was founded during the Silla Dynasty period by prince Kim Sŭksŭng (김숙승; 金叔承) as the progenitor of the clan, who was the grandson of Gyeongsun of Silla, the last king of Silla. Due to this, they were often referred to as the 'rebels' of the Korean noble family during the Goryeo Dynasty period and were also known as the Sangrak Kim clan (상락 김씨, 上洛 金氏). During this period, general Kim Panggyŏng (김방경; 金方慶; 1212 —1300) who was a legendary swordsman of Goryeo dynasty, raised the clan back to its former prestige, becoming considered as the intermediary ancestor (중시조; 中始祖; chung sijo) of the family.

When the Mongols invaded during the reign of King Gojong of the Goryeo Dynasty, Kim Panggyŏng entered Wido in 1248 as a Pyŏngma P'angwan of Sŏbungmyŏn (서북면; 西北面), where he fought against his former comrades and mercenaries who turned rogue against the kingdom during the Sambyeolcho Rebellion. He was then ordered to aid the Mongol invasions of Japan in reluctance. Despite being Kublai Khan's most trusted and respected swordsman - being the first foreigner to receive the 2nd rank of noble as a warrior (문무 2품 文武) in 1276, which was a higher rank than the former emperor of Southern Song - he only showed loyalty to King Gojong, which in turn, made Kublai Khan respect him as a warrior even more so. During the Mongolian Invasion of Japan in 1273, he led the wars of Tsushima to victory in only 6 hours, and destroyed the 30 km length army barricades set of modern Fukuoka city by the Kamakura shogunate army. This led to the defeat of the shogunate army and the Shimazu clan, and forced them to retreat to Dazaifu's Water Castle (水城). However, during this period, he was yet again framed by his political rivals during 1278. Due to the pressure from his loyal court, king of the Goryeo dynasty reluctantly ordered to torture him at his age of 66 and ordered exile against his sons, almost ending the clan. According to the official records of Goryeo Sajulyeo, people of Kim Panggyŏng's territory cried and begged for his release during February 1278, trying to stop the carriage that was transporting him by throwing rocks at the soldiers and ordering his release. This led Kublai Khan to order Kim Panggyŏng's release himself, and he was released in 1280 at the age of 68. Although he later tried to resign from his rank as a military officer, due to injuries and disability made during his torture, the king refused his resignation and insisted him to stay. Historians assert that this was most likely due to king's attempt to conceive political checks and balances against the increasing Mongolian influence within the Goryeo Dynasty's loyal court, as Kim Panggyŏng was the only loyal Korean imperialist general of his court. He was listed as a member of the Central Book of Records, and died in 1300 at the age of 88.

His 12th successor, Kim Simin, followed the clan's footstep as a noble scholar and a swordsman, and was appointed as the military official of the North, where he fought against the Nit'anggae's rebellion during 1583. However, due to the corruption within Joseon Dynasty's military at the time, he resigned after publicly criticizing the king and his military order at the time. Although he was later reinstated as the aiding general of Jinju in 1591, his commander and comrades soon fled Jinju city upon hearing about the upcoming invasion heading to the city, leaving the citizens to die and only him to defend the city. Thus, he took control of the 1,000 swordsman of the Jinju castle, and began acting very proactive against the attacks. Despite the sheer outnumbered factions against the Japanese armies, who were now armed with Dutch firearms and guns due to their trades with the West, Kim Simin led his army to multiple victories by recapturing the lost cities of Geochang County, Goseong County, South Gyeongsang, Changwon, Jinhae-gu, and Sacheon with only 1000 men. Due to these incredulous and almost inhumane accomplishments, the Japanese army feared him, and dubbed him as a monster / ghost / phantasm named Mokusō Hōgan (木曽判官). This myth was only solidified during the siege of Jinju castle, where Ukita Hideie and samurai Hosokawa Tadaoki led a siege against 3,800 soldiers of Jinju city with 30,000 Japanese armies. However, the Japanese samurais lost within 7 days siege, with 16,000 casualties whereas Jinju army only suffered 150 casualties in total. Although a bullet wound that Simin received during this siege took his life 11 days after the siege ended, his myth was further solidified by the 18th century kabuki The Legend of Tenjiku Tokubei (天竺徳兵衛韓噺), which depicts Tenjuku Tokubei as the son of Kim Simin, who teaches him evil Christian magic and orders him to terrorize Japan. The census in 2020 found the number of members to be 1,005,500.

=== Andong Kim clan (New) ===
Kim Sŭpdon (김습돈; 金習敦) made his ascendant, Kim Sŏnp'yŏng (김선평; 金宣平), the founder of New Andong Kim clan. Kim Sŏnp'yŏng was one of the founding merit subjects of the Goryeo dynasty. He was originally a castellan of Andong province. Later, he received a new surname from Taejo of Goryeo thanks to his contribution to the founding of the new dynasty. In 2020, the number of members of the New Andong Kim clan amounted to 30,300 individuals. It is the most prestigious family in Korea. The largest number of nobles was born in the entire history of Joseon.

== Prominent individuals from the Old Andong Kim clan ==
- Deposed Crown Princess Kim
- Kim Chil
- Kim Simin
- Kim Jip
- Kim Chajŏm
- Kim Gu

== Prominent individuals from the New Andong Kim clan ==
- Kim Jo-sun
- Kim Chwagŭn
- Queen Hyohyeon
- Queen Cheorin
- Kim Okkyun
- Kim Chwa-chin
- Kim Soo-han
- Kim Ok-suk

=== Head House of the New Andong Kim Clan ===
This is the head house of the family of Kim Yŏngsu (1446-1502, pen name: Yangseodang), a civil official of the Joseon period (1392-1910). A head house is a residence passed down among the male successors of a family lineage. Sosan-ri Village, where the house is located, has been a clan village of the Andong Kim clan ever since Kim Yŏngsu's grandfather Kim Samgŭn (1390-1465) moved there in the 15th century.

Kim Yŏngsu demonstrated skill in martial arts at an early age. In recognition of his ancestor's merits, he was given an official post without taking the state examination. His great-great-grandson Kim Sanghŏn (1570-1652) served as minister of rites. The clan eventually became one of the most influential families during the late Joseon period.

The house faces southwest and has no main gate. All the buildings have tiled roofs. The residential area of the house consists of a men’s quarters, gate quarters, and a women’s quarters, which together form a square layout with a courtyard in the center. There is also a shrine at the back to the right of the women’s quarters. The women’s quarters features a wooden-floored hall in the center with an underfloor-heated room on either side. The main room on the left has a narrow wooden veranda in front of it. The men’s quarters consists of an underfloor-heated room to the left and a wooden-floored hall to the right, which are separated by liftable doors and can be joined into a single space when necessary.
