= Royal Tombs of the Joseon Dynasty =

Historic site in South Korea

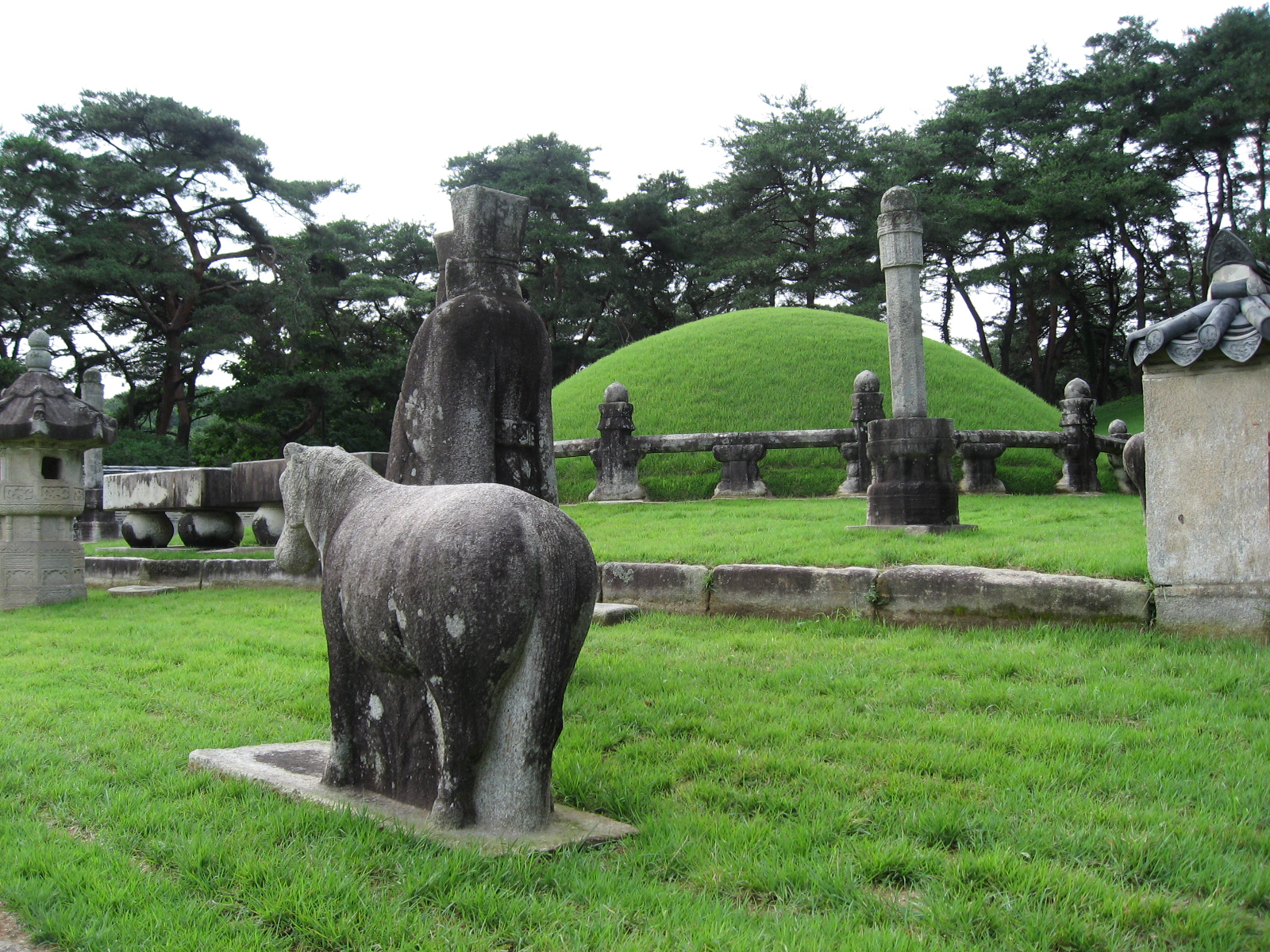
- Yeongneung, the resting place of Sejong the Great and Queen Soheon

- Location of the tombs
- Location: South Korea

History
- Built: Joseon

Site notes
- Governing body: Cultural Heritage Administration of Korea

UNESCO World Heritage Site
- Type: Cultural
- Criteria: iii, iv, vi
- Designated: 2009 (33rd session)
- Reference no.: 1319
- Region: Asia and Australasia

Korean name
- Hangul: 조선왕릉
- Hanja: 朝鮮王陵
- RR: Joseon wangneung
- MR: Chosŏn wangnŭng

The Royal Tombs of the Joseon Dynasty (Korean: 조선왕릉) is a UNESCO World Heritage Site registered in 2009 that includes 40 tombs of members of the House of Yi, which ruled Korea (at the time known as Joseon, and later as the Korean Empire) between 1392 and 1910. The tombs are scattered over 18 locations across the Korean Peninsula. They were built to honor the ancestors and their achievements, and assert royal authority. Two other Joseon tombs, located in Kaesong, North Korea, were proposed but not submitted.

The Joseon royal tombs were influenced by the royal tomb systems of the Three Kingdoms and Goryeo periods, and the overall form of the Joseon royal tombs was directly influenced by Hyeonjeongneung, the tomb of King Gongmin. According to the CHA, of all the royal tombs of Korea's successive dynasties, the Joseon royal tombs are the best preserved. Not only are the tombs of all the kings and queens fully preserved, but the tombs of Joseon princes, princesses, and royal concubines have also been preserved alongside them. Detailed records also survive, including specific regulations on the royal tombs such as the Gukjo oryeui (Five Rites of State), the Gyeongguk daejeon (National Code), and the Uigwe (royal protocols), as well as the manpower and tools used in building each tomb. These make it possible to learn about Joseon funeral culture, the regulations and history of the royal tombs, and their ritual procedures. In addition, on the basis of these records, ancestral rites continue to be performed at the royal tombs at the appointed times, carrying on the intangible culture and traditions of the Joseon period.

== Structure and classification ==
=== Layout ===
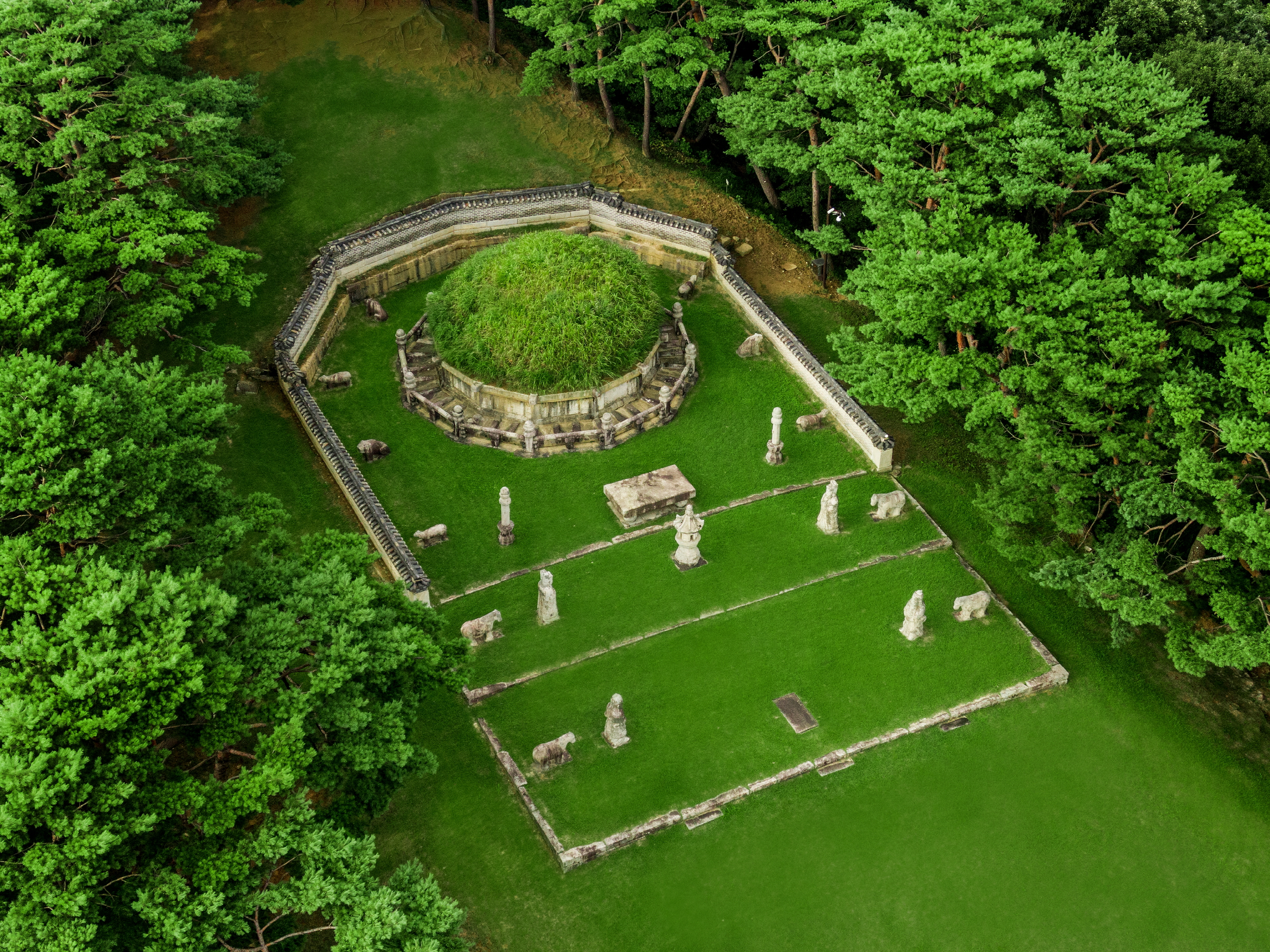
The burial area of Geonwolleung

1. Gokjang 2. Seokho 3. Seogyang 4. Mangjuseok 5. Bongbun 6. Nangganseok 7. Honyuseok 8. Muninseok 9. Jangmyeongdeung 10. Seongma 11. Muinseok 12. Yegam 13. Bigak 14. Jeongjagak 15. Chamdo 16. Suragan 17. Subokbang 18. Baewi 19. Hongsalmun

The main components of a Joseon royal tomb are as follows, numbered as in the diagram above.

- Gokjang – the three sides of the wall around the burial mound, which protects the sacred area.
- Seokho – the tiger deity, which serves as the guardian of the bongbun.
- Seogyang – a sheep statue, which fends off the evil spirits from earth and prays for the soul of the departed.
- Mangjuseok – a pair of stone pillars erected on both sides of the burial mound.
- Bongbun – the place where the body of the departed lies; also called neungchim or neungsang.
- Nangganseok – a hedge-like stone, which protects the byeongpungseok.
- Honyuseok – a rectangular stone erected in front of the burial mound, which is believed to invite the soul of the departed to come out.
- Muninseok – statues of scholars placed on the left and right sides of the jangmyeongdeung.
- Jangmyeongdeung – a lantern, which comforts the soul of the departed and prays for blessings.
- Seongma – a horse statue.
- Muinseok – the statue of a soldier, which is said to be guarding the king and is placed below the muninseok.
- Yegam – used for burning the written prayers after a burial service; it is located on the left-side corner behind the jeongjagak.
- Bigak – a small pavilion, which houses a stone monument inscribed with the names of the king and the queen on the front, and a list of the king's accomplishments on the back.
- Jeongjagak – the shrine where memorial services are held.
- Chamdo – two stone-covered pathways that lead to the jeongjagak; the higher one is called sindo, while the lower one is called eodo (this is the pathway used by visitors).
- Suragan – the kitchen where food is prepared for memorial services.
- Subokbang – the living quarters of the officer guarding the tomb.
- Baewi – the place where visitors knelt in honor of the departed; also called panwi or eobaeseok.
- Hongsalmun – the gate with two red cylindrical pillars.
- Byeongpungseok – the stone which was placed underneath and around to protect the bongbun.

=== Entrance area ===
The Hongsalmun (紅箭門, "red arrow gate") is a wooden gate painted red. Two round pillars are erected, and on top, with no roof, arrow-shaped wooden pieces are lined up side by side, with a samtaeguk (three-part taegeuk) pattern in the center. It was erected in front of royal tombs (neung), princely tombs (won), tombs (myo), and palaces, and signaled the sanctity of the place. A Hongsalmun was set up not only at the entrance to each royal tomb but also at the entrance to a group of royal tombs. Right next to the Hongsalmun is the Baewi (拜位), a space of about one pyeong paved with stones. Here the king bowed; it is also called panwi, eobaeseok, or mangneungwi.

=== Jeongjagak ===
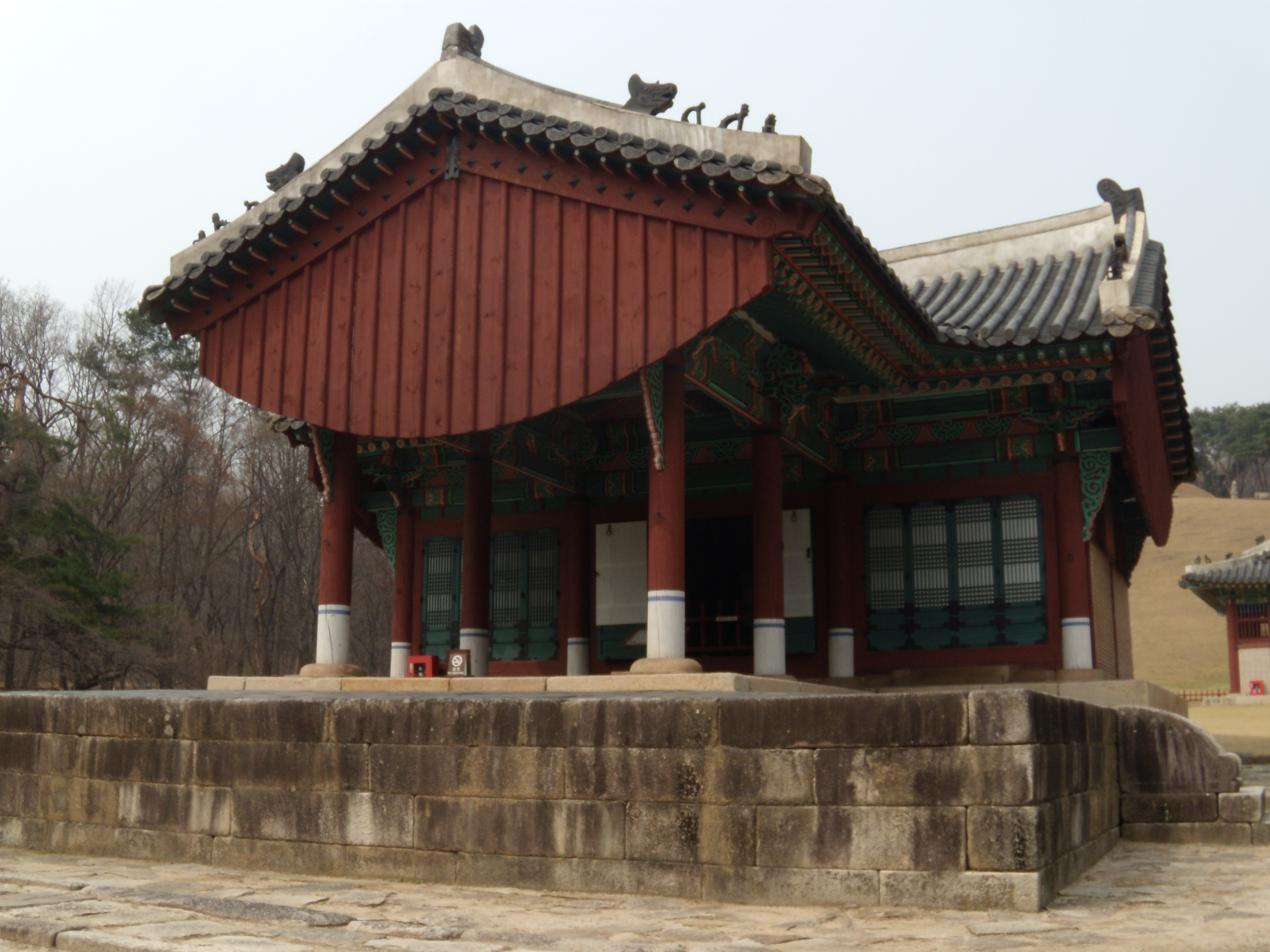
The Jeongjagak of Geonwolleung

The Jeongjagak (丁字閣) is a T-shaped building (shaped like the character 丁) in which, during rites, offerings are laid out on the ritual implements (jegu) inside and the rites are performed. It is an essential structure at a Joseon royal tomb. The Jeongjagak of Joseon royal tombs generally have gable roofs (maebae-jibung), but Sungneung, within Donggureung, has a hipped-and-gabled roof (palja-jibung). This is presumed to be due to the vogue for things Chinese that prevailed in the late 17th century, just after the Manchu invasion of 1636 and the fall of the Ming dynasty. In addition, the Jeongjagak of Sungneung has side wings (ingnang, 翼廊) attached on the left and right, and this was inherited by later Jeongjagak, so that wings were also added to the Jeongjagak of Hwineung, Uireung, and others.

=== Burial area ===
On the byeongpungseok (屛風石, "folding-screen stones") that encircle the base of the mound, the twelve zodiac animal deities (sibiji), responsible for the twelve directions, are carved in relief at their corresponding directions, with the meaning of driving off impurities and evil spirits that would encroach on the mound. Together with the byeongpungseok, nangganseok (欄干石, stone railings) surround the mound, and in the later Joseon royal tombs the style changed so that only the nangganseok surrounded the mound. The gokjang (曲牆), a curved wall enclosing the burial area on three sides, was introduced for the first time in the Joseon royal tombs. It surrounds the east, west, and north sides of the burial area and protects the mound.

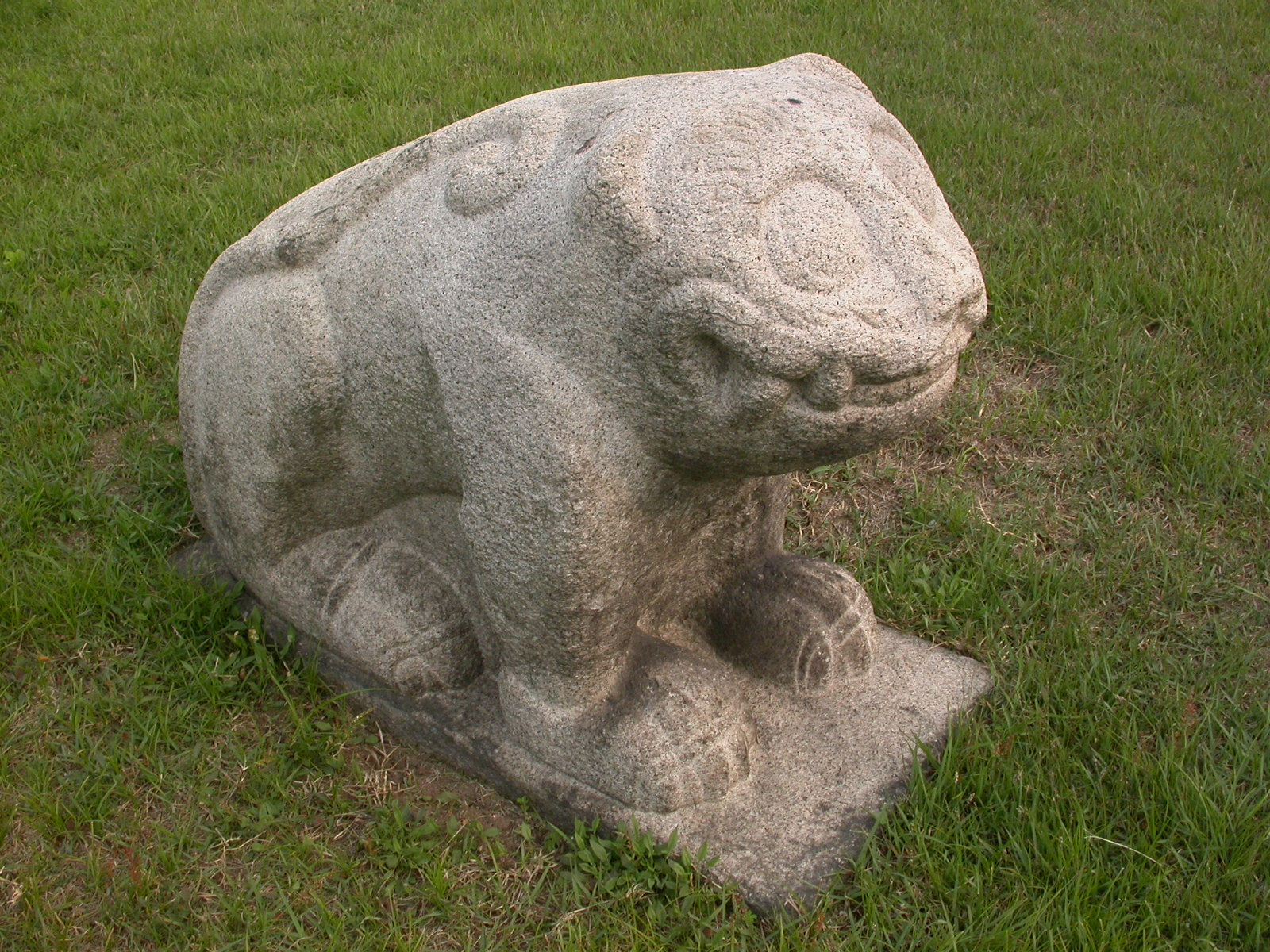
Stone tiger (Uireung)

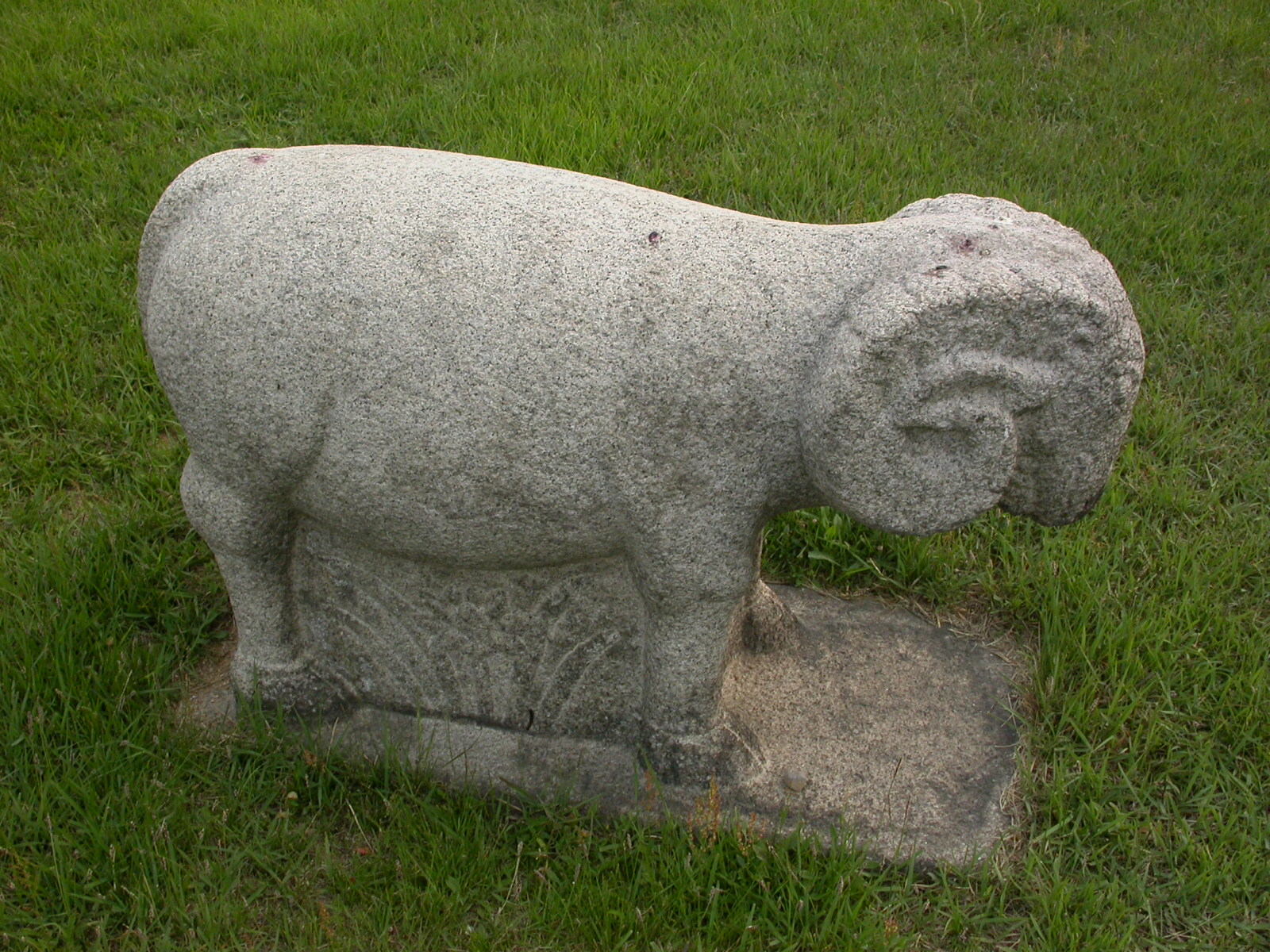
Stone sheep (Uireung)

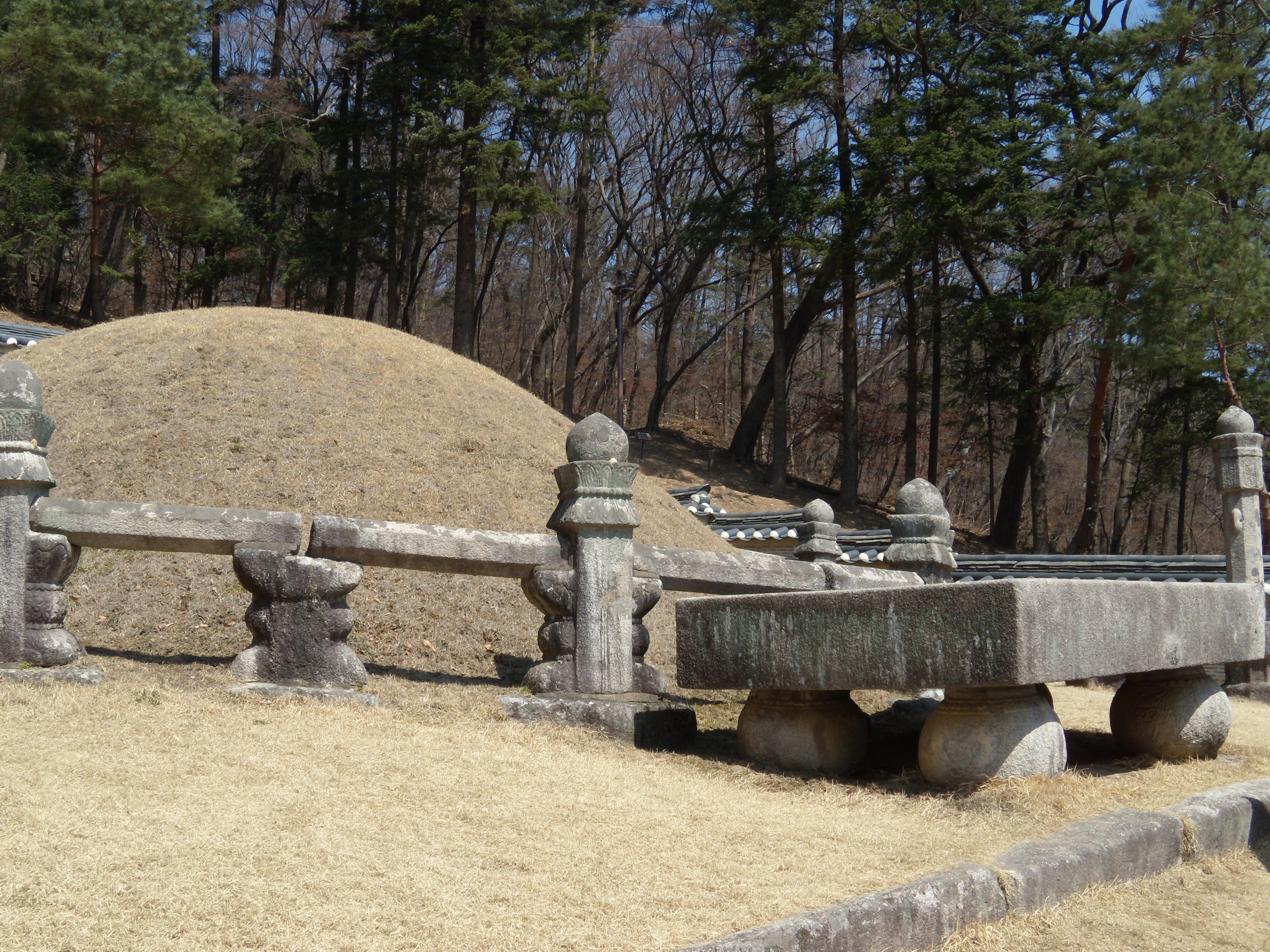
Honyuseok and nangganseok (Gwangneung)

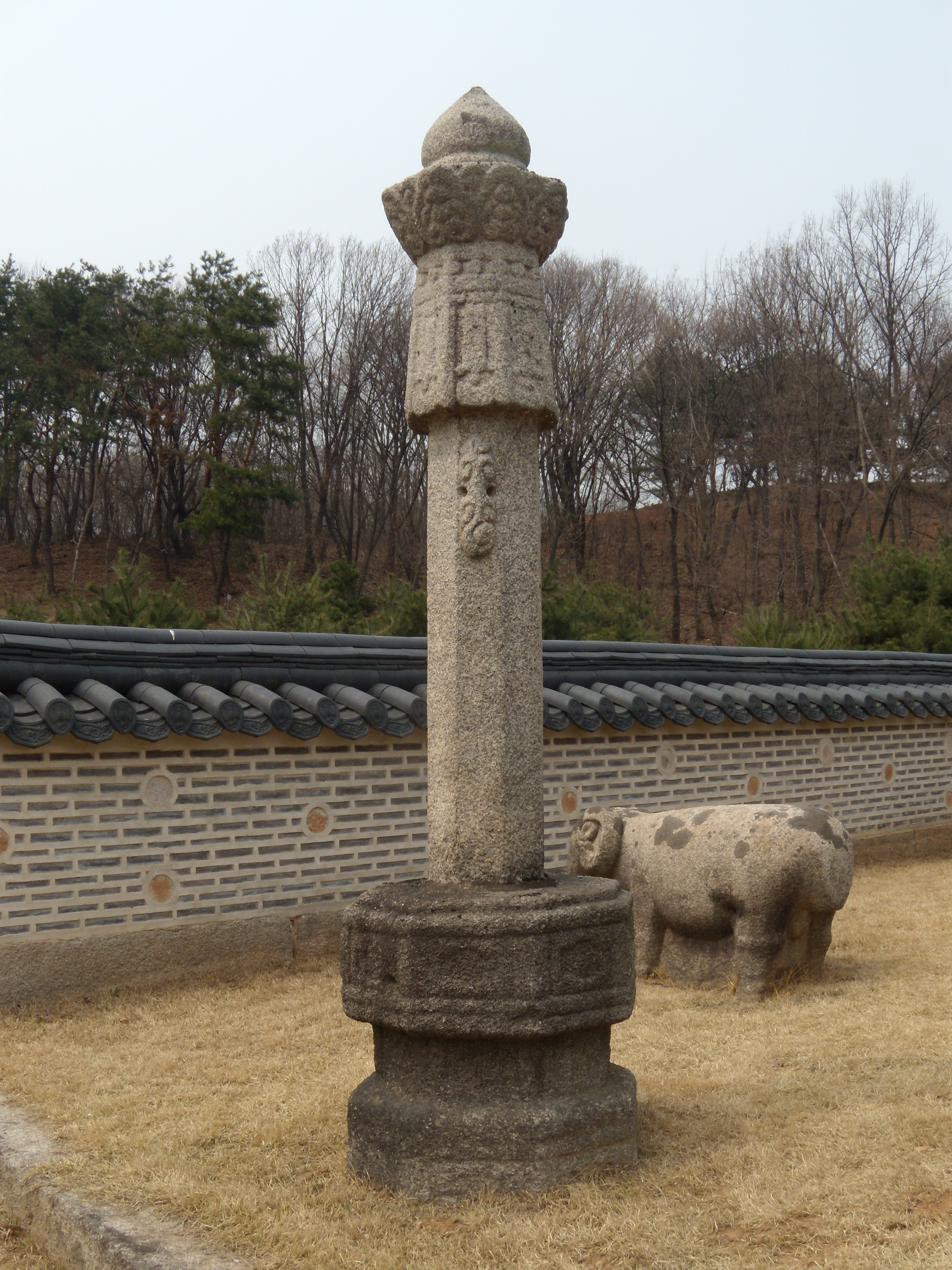
Mangjuseok (Mongneung)

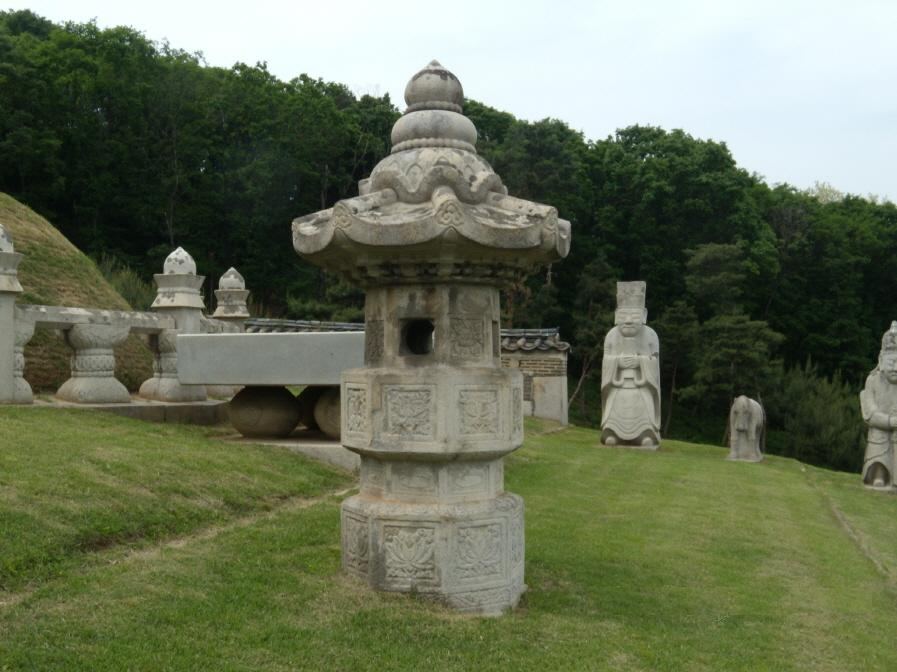
Jangmyeongdeung (Sungneung)

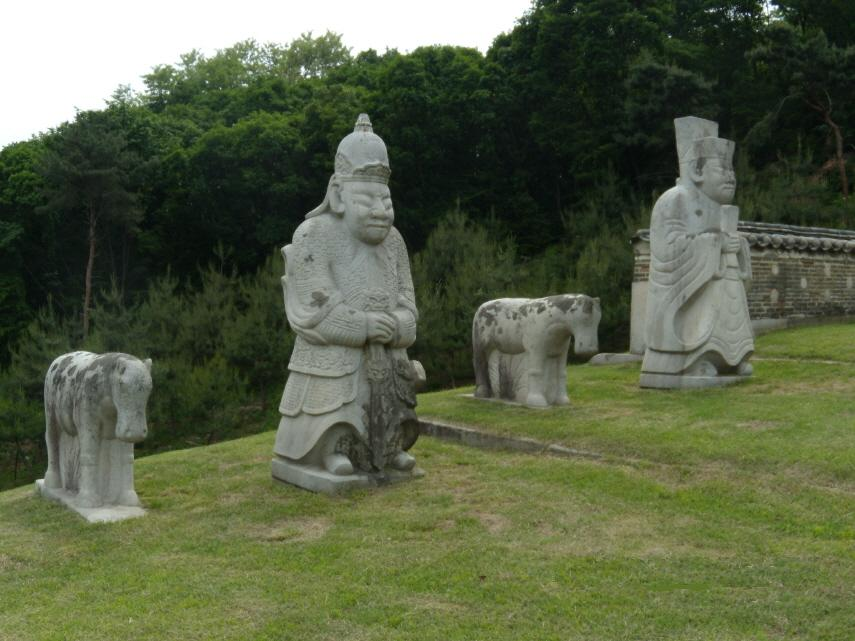
Civil and military officer statues and stone horses (Sungneung)

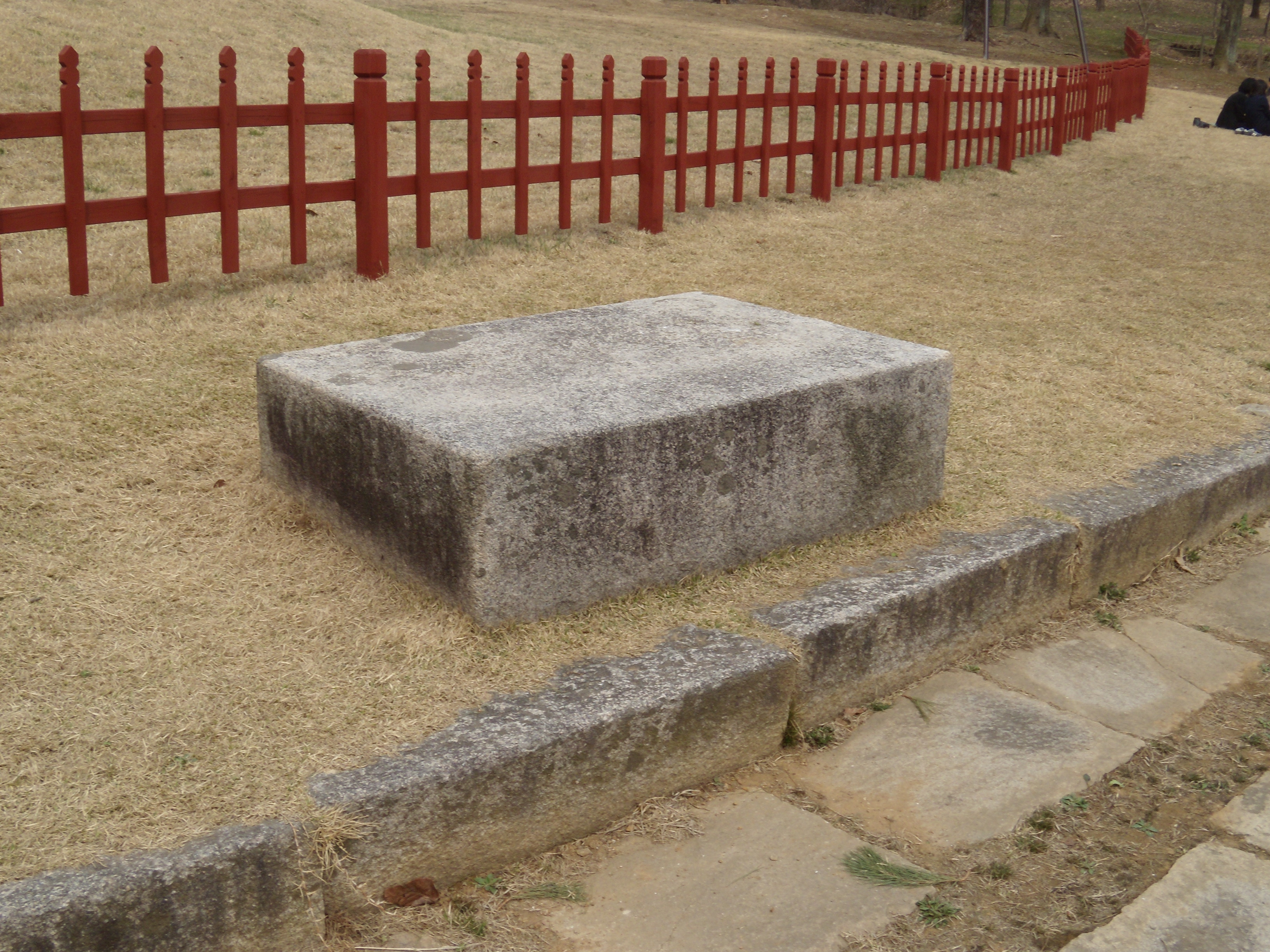
Sansinseok (Sureung)

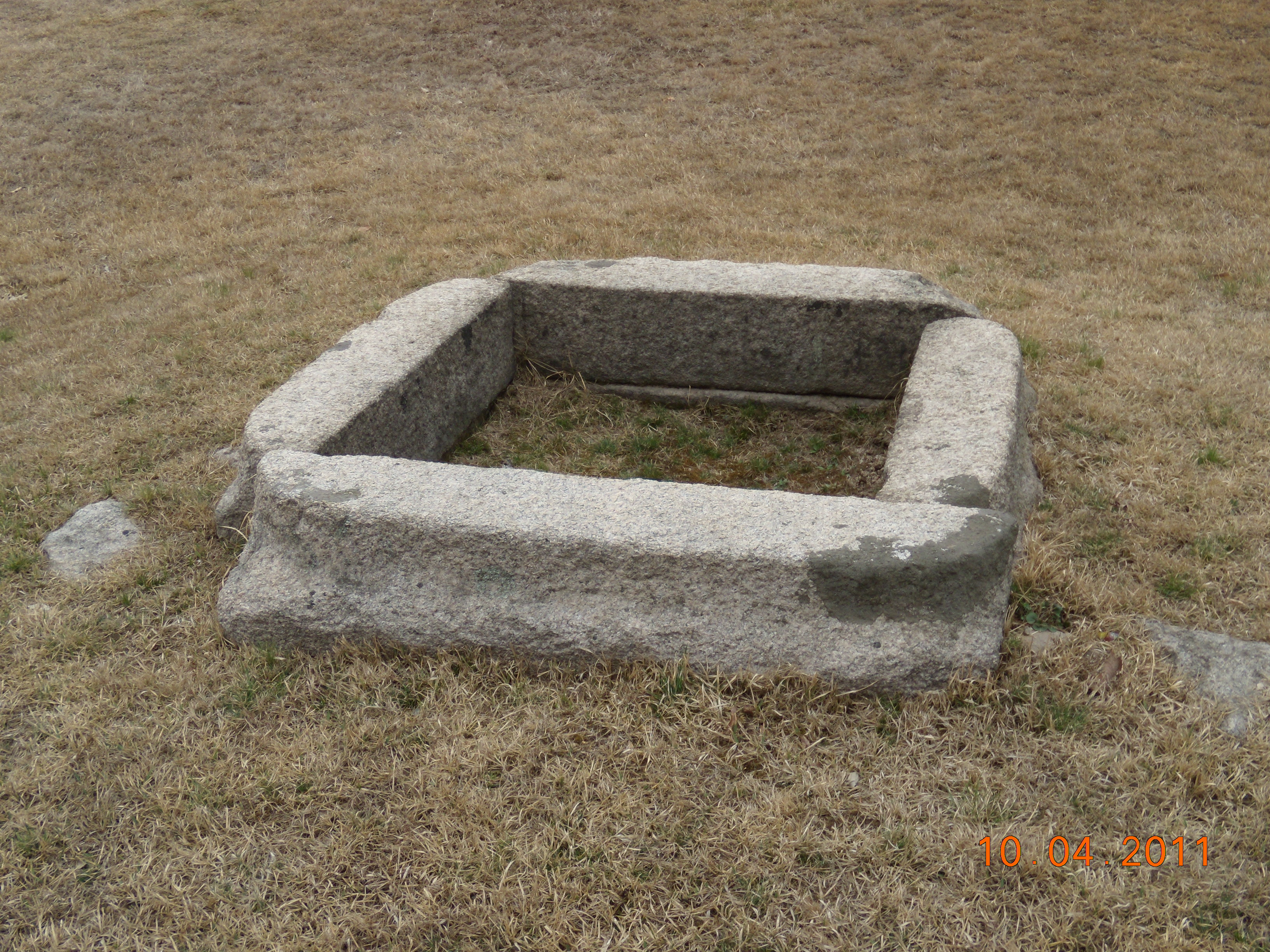
Yegam (Hwineung)

=== Classification by mound arrangement ===
A dongwon igangneung (同原異岡陵) is a tomb in which the mounds of the king and queen are placed on separate hills within the same tomb precinct.

Hyeonneung took the dongwon igangneung form only in 1513 (the 8th year of Jungjong), when the tomb of Queen Hyeondeok was relocated.

A dongwon sangha-neung (同原上下陵) is a tomb in which the mounds and stone sculptures of the king and queen are placed above and below one another on a single hill (ibong isil); representative examples are Hyojong's Nyeongneung and Gyeongjong's Uireung.

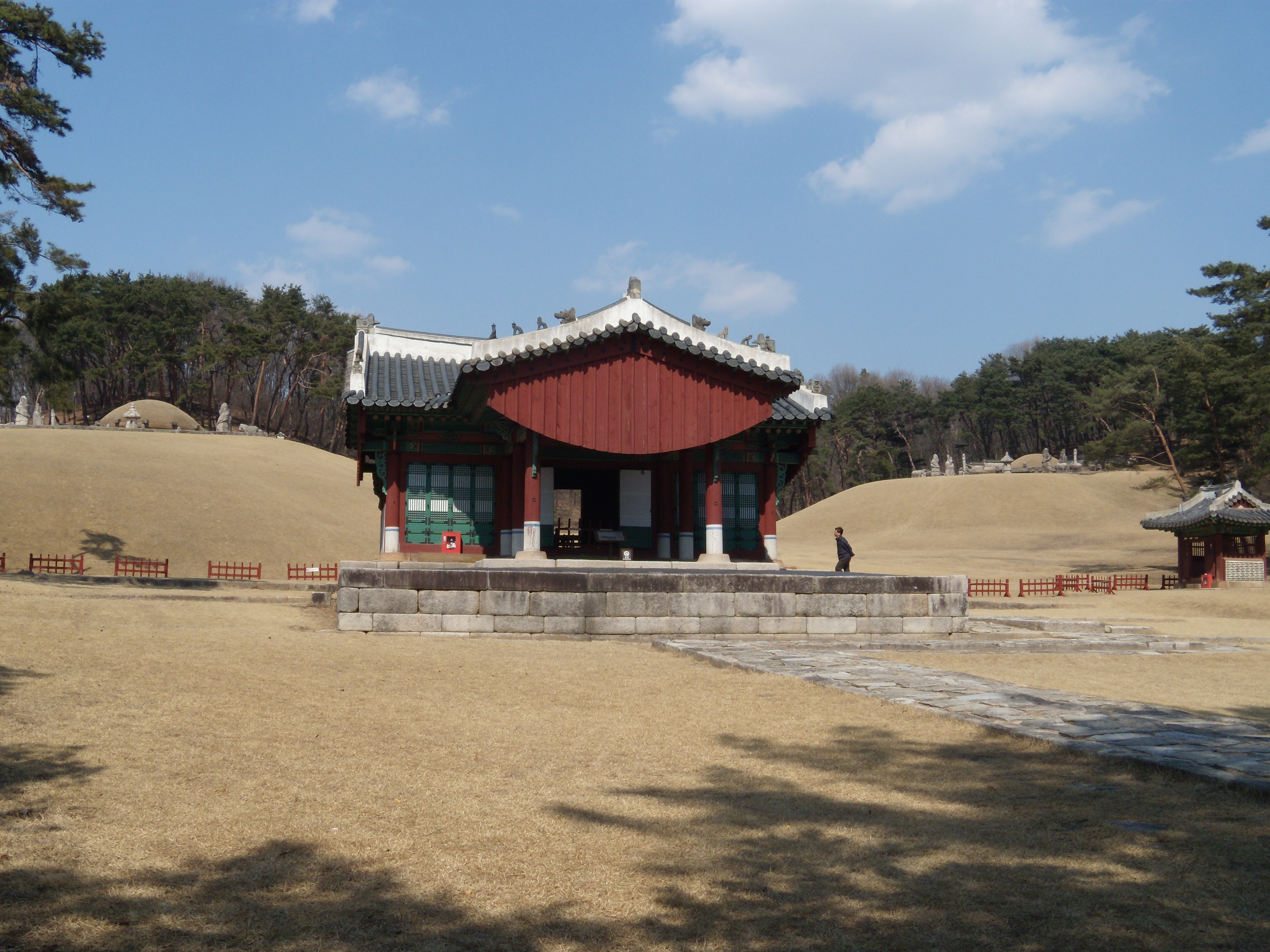
Dongwon igangneung (Hyeonneung)

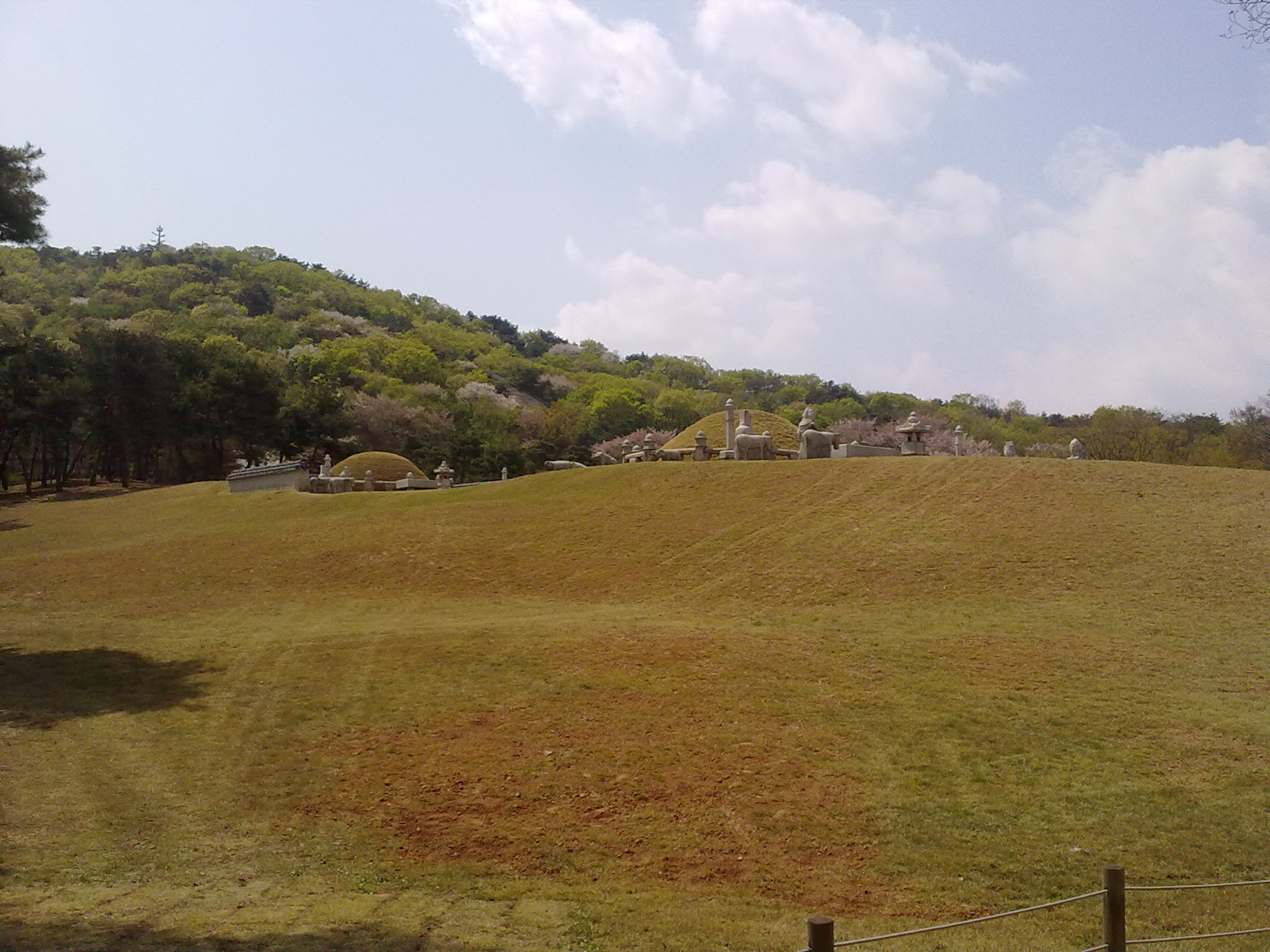
Dongwon sangha-neung (Uireung)

== Funerals and the construction of royal tombs ==
=== Immediately after the king's death ===
After the chojong (初終), the confirmation of the death of the king or queen, a eunuch took the clothes the king had worn, climbed onto the roof of the place where the king had died, and, facing north, performed the bok (復) ritual by shouting "Sangwi bok" (上位復; for a queen, "Junggung bok", 中宮復) three times. "Sangwi bok" carries the meaning "Your Majesty, please return." Immediately after the bok, the eunuch quickly threw the king's clothes down from the roof; a eunuch waiting below caught the clothes at once, carried them into the building, covered the king's body with them, and waited five days in the hope that he would revive. After five days had passed, preparations for the placing of the body in the coffin began immediately. After that, except for the crown prince (the successor to the late king), the grand princes and princesses all changed into plain mourning clothes, let their hair down, and fasted for about three days. Then, through the gyeryeong (戒令), the work concerning the funeral and the construction of the royal tomb was divided up; this was handled by the Six Ministries. The Ministry of Military Affairs guarded various places, the Ministry of Rites reported matters concerning the mourning rites to the State Council, and the Ministry of Personnel set up temporary organizations (dogam) called the Binjeon-dogam, the Gukjang-dogam, and the Sanneung-dogam and had each carry out its assigned tasks.

=== Construction ===
The construction of the royal tomb was handled by the Sanneung-dogam and required a great deal of time and manpower; when Taejo's Geonwolleung was built, it took about 3 to 5 months and approximately 6,000 to 9,000 people were mobilized.

=== Records ===
Each Joseon royal tomb kept a neungji, recording the management and important matters of the tomb. There are also the Gukjo oryeui, the Gyeongguk daejeon, the Sok oryeui, and the Gukjo sangnye bopyeon, which record the regulations and procedures for building royal tombs, so that it is also possible to learn how the tomb system and stone sculptures of the Joseon royal tombs changed over history.

== History of the tomb system and stone sculptures ==
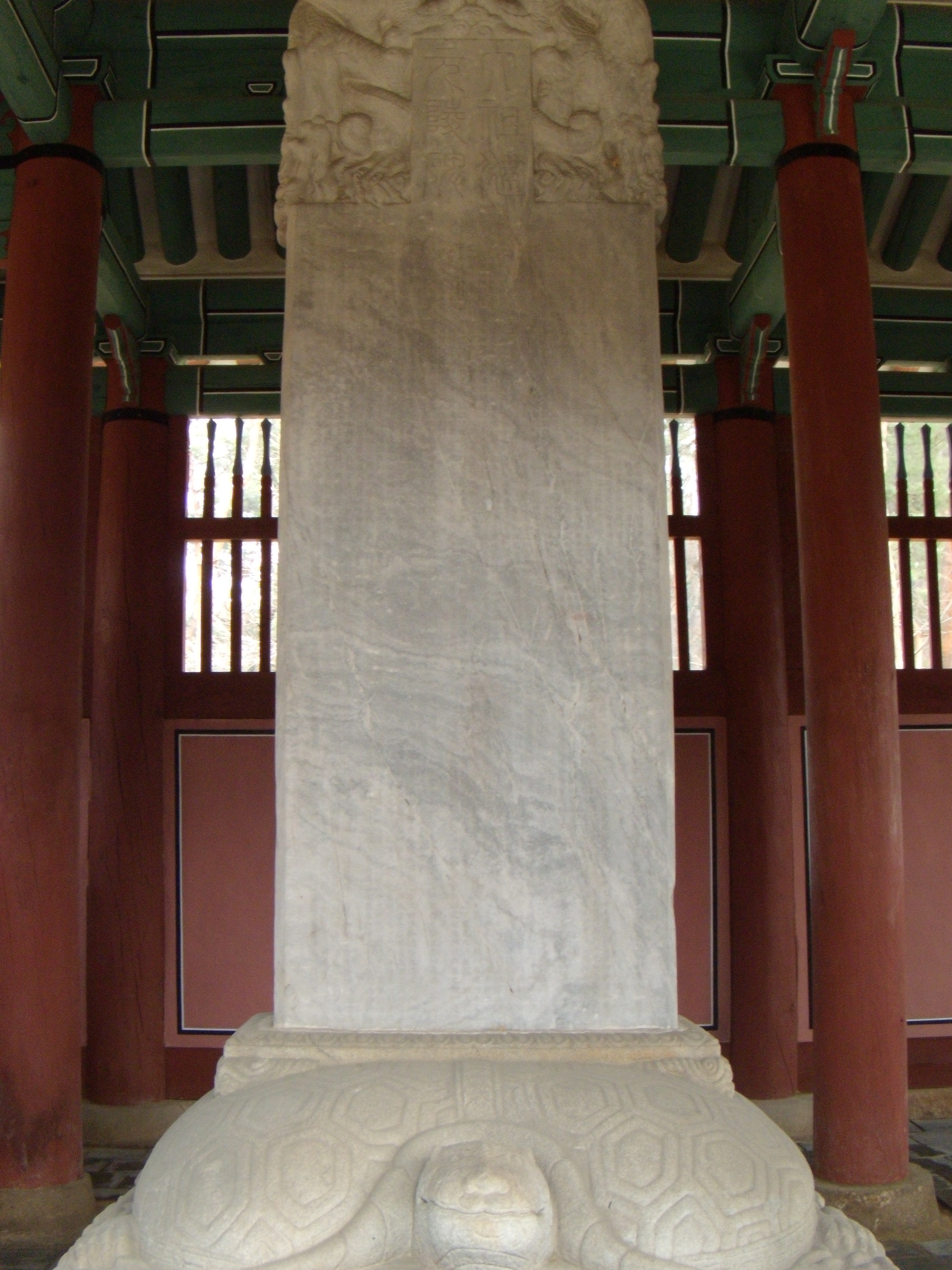
The sindobi of Geonwolleung

=== Late Goryeo to early Joseon ===
Early Joseon royal tombs also retained some styles with the Buddhist character of the Goryeo period. Representative Goryeo-period styles include the square jangmyeongdeung at Jeongneung, the wonchal (temples that assisted in the rites of royal tombs), and the sojeondae. Other early Joseon styles include the sindobi, the five goseok (drum stones) supporting the honyuseok, and the stone chamber in which the jaegung was placed. When Geonwolleung was being built, the Office of Astronomy (Seounggwan) submitted a memorial proposing that the tomb chamber be made as a stone chamber (石室), and after much discussion the matter was decided by divination at Jongmyo, and a stone chamber was built.

=== Early Joseon ===
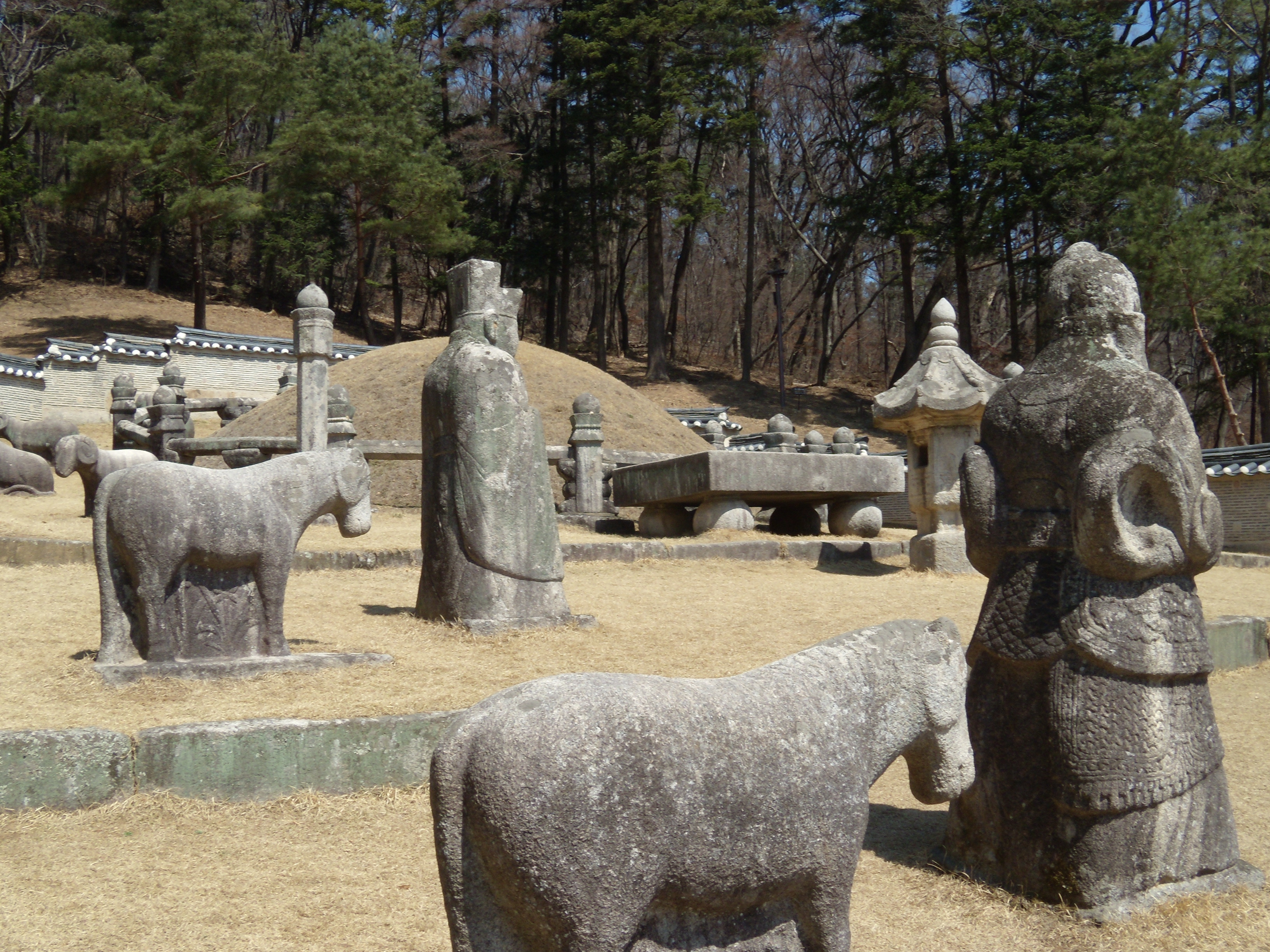
Gwangneung, with its simplified tomb system

When the contents of the Gukjo oryeui were compiled in the reign of Sejong, the tomb system of the early Joseon royal tombs, which had been partly mixed with Buddhist styles, was changed into a style unique to the Joseon period through the Gukjo oryeui. The patterns of bangmul and shield motifs were removed from the byeongpungseok, the number of goseok was reduced to four, and the sojeondae, where the prayer text was burned, was replaced by the yegam.

Gwangneung brought many changes to the style of early Joseon royal tombs, such as being built for the first time in the dongwon igangneung style, with the mounds on different hills.

When Seongjong's father, Crown Prince Uigyeong, was posthumously elevated as Deokjong, his tomb was also elevated; there was a debate over whether the stone sculptures should be furnished in the style of a royal tomb, but following the precedent of the former kings (Mokjo, Ikjo, Dojo, and Hwanjo), the existing style was kept. Afterwards, Deokjong's Gyeongneung became the model for the tombs of posthumously honored kings.

=== Mid-Joseon ===
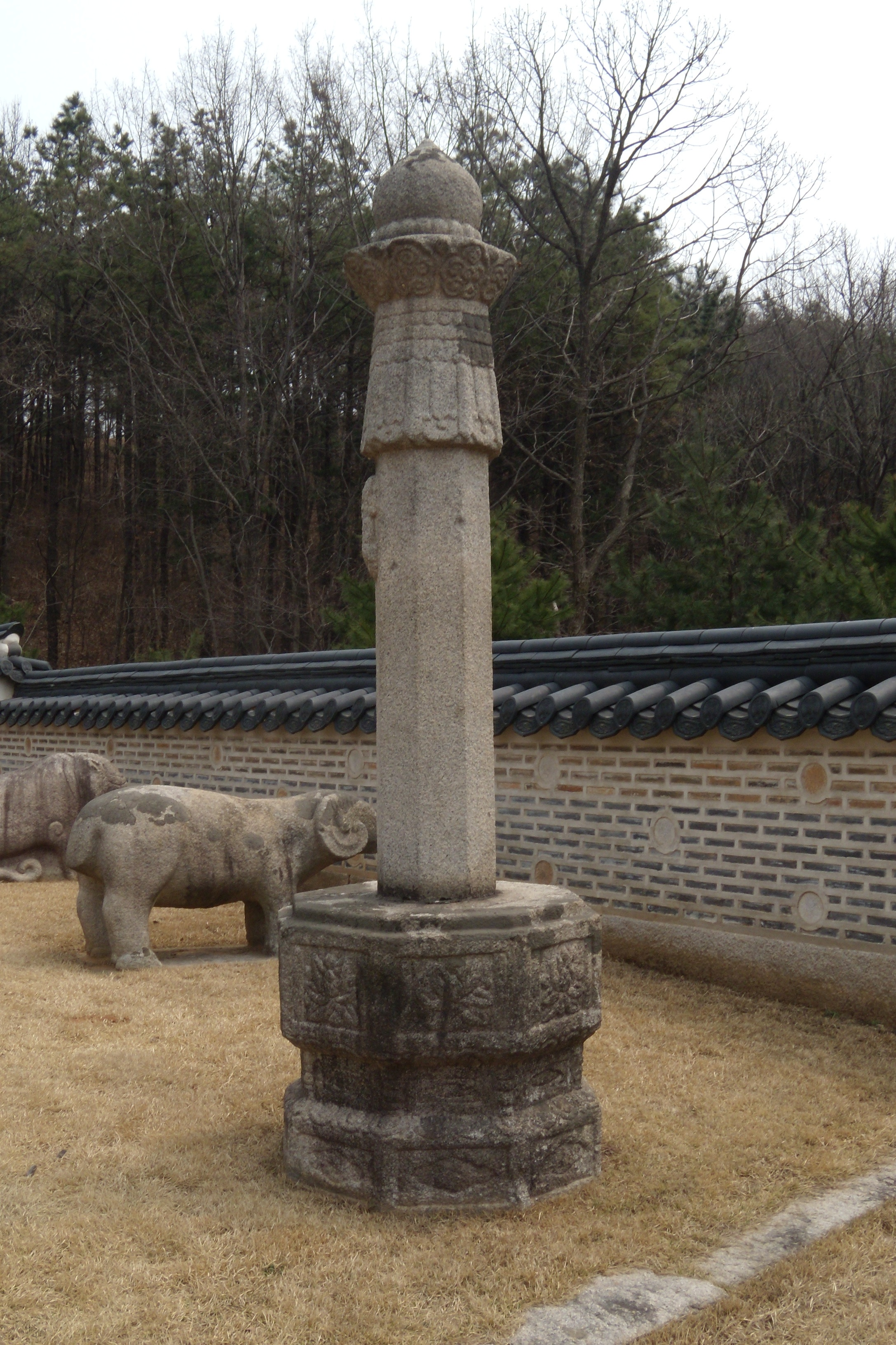
The mangjuseok of Mongneung

Afterwards, in the middle and later Joseon period, besides the simplified style from Sejo's Gwangneung, the style of the Gukjo oryeui and the early Joseon style of Geonwolleung and Heolleung were also used, so that three major styles coexisted.

At Queen Inmok's tomb within Mongneung, the royal tomb of Seonjo, floral patterns (hwamun) were carved for the first time on the mangjuseok and on the base stones of the jangmyeongdeung; afterwards, when Injo's Jangneung was relocated, the stone sculptures of the old tomb did not fit the dimensions of the new tomb site and so were newly made, and at that time floral patterns were carved onto the byeongpungseok in place of the existing cloud patterns and zodiac figures. The style of carving floral patterns continued to be used up to Hongyureung.

Then, when Hyojong's tomb, which had been near Geonwolleung, was relocated to Yeoju (Nyeongneung), the system of installing byeongpungseok was completely abolished, so that byeongpungseok were no longer installed except at Yungneung and Hongyureung. In addition, ground lime (jihoe) began to be spread on the floor of the hoegyeok.

=== Late Joseon ===
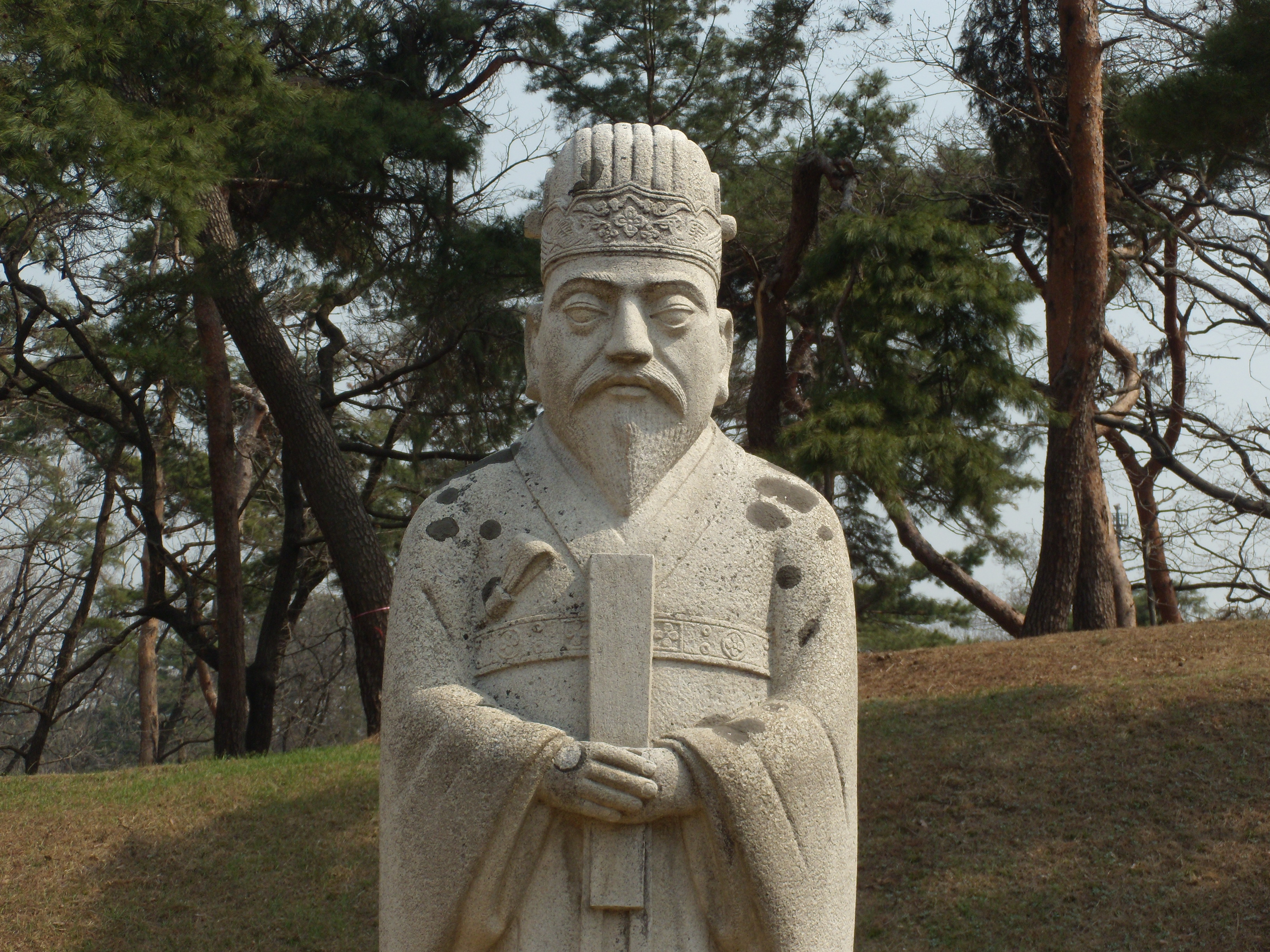
A civil officer statue in gold crown and court dress at Yureung

Sukjong's Myeongneung was, by Sukjong's order, decorated simply following the system of Jeongjong's Hureung, with fewer burial goods and stone sculptures made close to life size. In addition, the jangmyeongdeung with a square canopy-shaped top (sagak okgaehyeong), used at the tombs (won) of grand princes and princesses and at royal tombs, was institutionalized. Later, Myeongneung became the basic tomb system of the Sok oryeui (Sanneung-ui), and the basis of the Gukjo sangnye bopyeon (Sanneung-ui), becoming a turning point in the late Joseon royal tomb system.

Yungneung, the tomb of Crown Prince Sado, the father of Jeongjo, is more ornate than other royal tombs. At this time the early Joseon style and the late Joseon style were harmonized: a new style of jangmyeongdeung appeared, with a roof shaped like a large flower placed on the traditional octagonal jangmyeongdeung at the top, floral patterns carved on the middle, and cloud-shaped feet (unjok) on the bottom. At this time, too, the civil officer statues changed from the Song-style figures wearing bokdu hats to figures in gold crown and court dress (geumgwan jobok).

In addition, when Gyeongneung was built, the lower and middle terraces of the burial area were merged, so that the civil and military officer statues of Gyeongneung, Sureung, and Yereung came to stand in a single space.

=== Korean Empire period ===
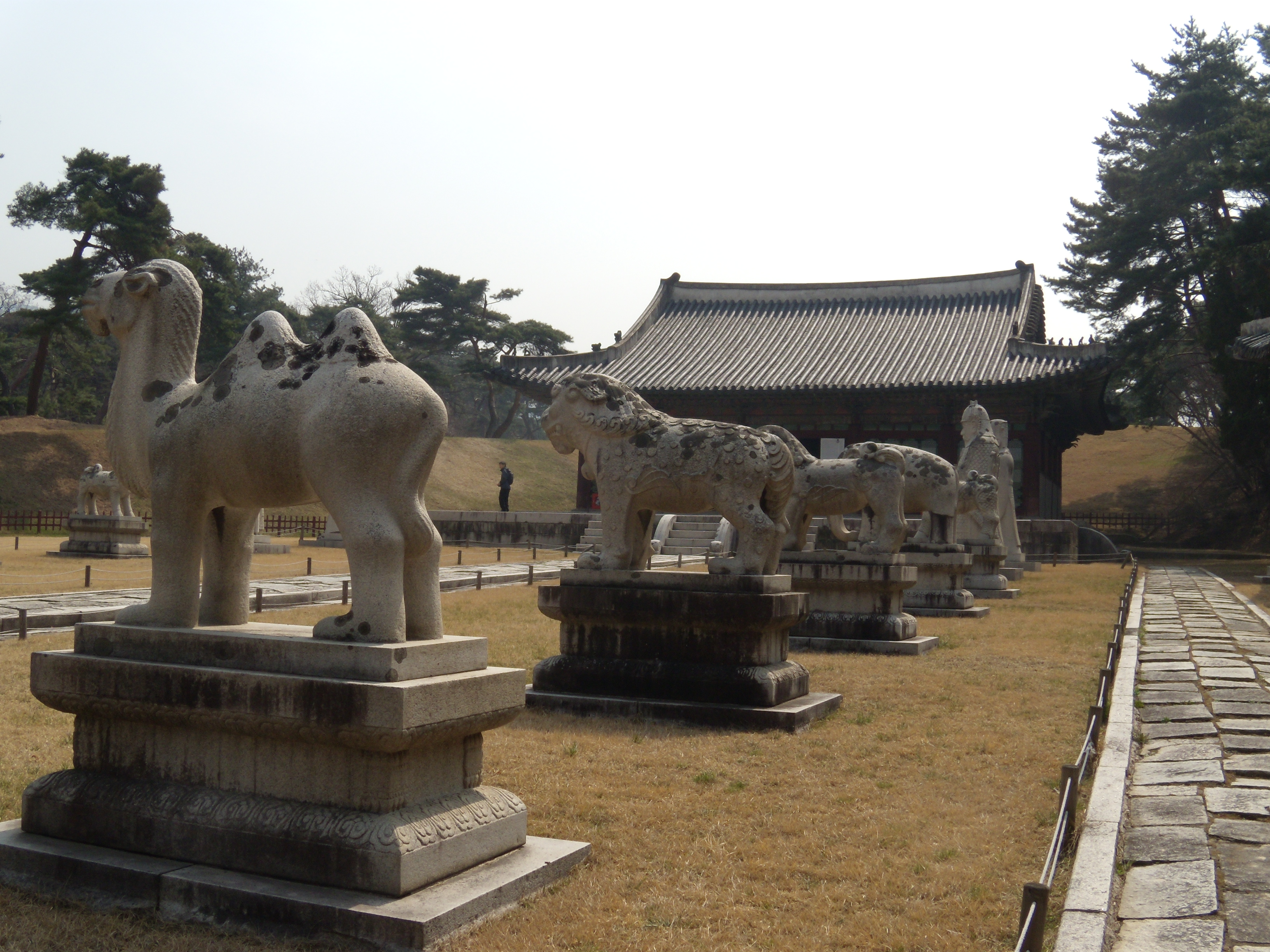
Yureung, with stone sculptures placed outside

In the imperial tombs of the Korean Empire, a chimjeon (寢殿) in the shape of the character 一 was installed instead of a Jeongjagak; the military officer statues, the civil officer statues in gold crown and court dress, and the stone animals were placed in front of the chimjeon, and a pair each of girin (qilin), elephant, lion, haetae, camel, and horse was added to the stone animals. The Chamdo from the Hongsalmun to the chimjeon has three paths, and the ritual implements were made in yellow, the color of the emperor. At this time, some of the kings of the Joseon period were also posthumously elevated to emperor, and yellow ritual implements were placed in the Jeongjagak of those royal tombs. In the burial area, apart from the civil and military officer statues and stone animals, byeongpungseok, which had been abolished in the reign of Hyojong, were made. In addition, at the entrance of an imperial tomb, a Samun (three-bay gate) used in palaces was installed instead of a gate in the form of a wall.

== Relocation of tombs (Cheonjang) ==
=== Problems of geomancy ===
The first time a geomantic problem was raised was with Sejong's Yeongneung. The place where Sejong was first buried was to the west of Heolleung. The problem was that the geomancer Choe Yang-seon caused much controversy by saying, "This is a land where the line of descendants will be cut off and the eldest son lost (絶嗣損長子)." The State Council and the Ministry of Rites requested that Choe Yang-seon be punished, but Sejong did not punish him, instead ordering that he not be used in major affairs of state. However, because Munjong died early and the line ended with Danjong, and because Sejo's eldest son Crown Prince Uigyeong and Yejong's eldest son Grand Prince Inseong died young, along with various other misfortunes, Sejong's tomb was moved in the reign of Yejong to its present site in Yeoju.

In addition, during the reign of Cheoljong, Sureung of Ikjong was also relocated, after a discussion that it was geomantically inauspicious, to an auspicious site on Yongmasan in Yangju, and then on 26 August 1855 was moved to its present location on the hill to the left of Geonwolleung. At the same time, Sunjo's Illeung was first buried on the ridge to the left of Jangneung in Paju, but there too it was argued that it was geomantically inauspicious, and on 11 October 1856 it was relocated to the hill next to Heolleung.

=== Political and personal problems ===
Apart from geomantic problems, there were occasional cases in which a tomb was relocated because of one person's will. In the reign of Jungjong, Kim An-ro, in order to eliminate his political enemy Jeong Gwang-pil, raised a problem about Huireung, the tomb of Queen Janggyeong. The substance of it was: "During construction of the royal tomb, bedrock was found, and burying the mother of the state in a place from which bedrock had been dug out cuts off the earth's vital energy." In fact, bedrock had been found, but Jungjong had had the omens divined at the time and been told it was acceptable, so the burial was moved a few ja below the spot where the bedrock had appeared. Kim An-ro strongly demanded relocation, and the tomb was relocated as he wished. Afterwards, Kim An-ro's side petitioned for the punishment of Jeong Gwang-pil, who had been involved, and in the end Jeong Gwang-pil was sentenced to exile.

Afterwards, Queen Munjeong, Jungjong's second queen consort, relocated Jungjong, who had been buried side by side with Queen Janggyeong, to beside Seongjong's Seolleung, in order that she herself might be buried next to him. However, the newly relocated Jeongneung flooded during the rainy season, so that, contrary to her wishes, Queen Munjeong was buried at Taereung, far from Jeongneung.

== Inscription as a World Heritage Site ==
Initially, Guri, where Donggureung is located, sought the inscription of Donggureung in 2003 in order to develop it as a royal tomb tourist attraction, but in 2004 the Cultural Heritage Administration decided to pursue the inscription of all 40 Joseon royal tombs together. An application was submitted to the UNESCO World Heritage Committee in January 2008; ICOMOS (International Council on Monuments and Sites) carried out an on-site inspection in September of that year; in January 2009 ICOMOS asked the Cultural Heritage Administration and the Korean government to resolve issues concerning the classification of the buffer zones around some of the royal tombs and the demolition of surrounding facilities, and after confirming the replies it submitted to UNESCO in May of that year an evaluation report bearing the recommendation "inscribe."

The Joseon royal tombs were recognized as a World Heritage Site for satisfying three of UNESCO's ten criteria: "royal ancestral rites that have continued for 600 years," "the formative and artistic value of the Joseon royal tombs," and "the Joseon period's unique interpretation of geomantic theory." Afterwards, to commemorate the Joseon royal tombs becoming a World Heritage Site, the Cultural Heritage Administration opened them free of charge from 27 June to 12 July 2010.

== Related festivals ==
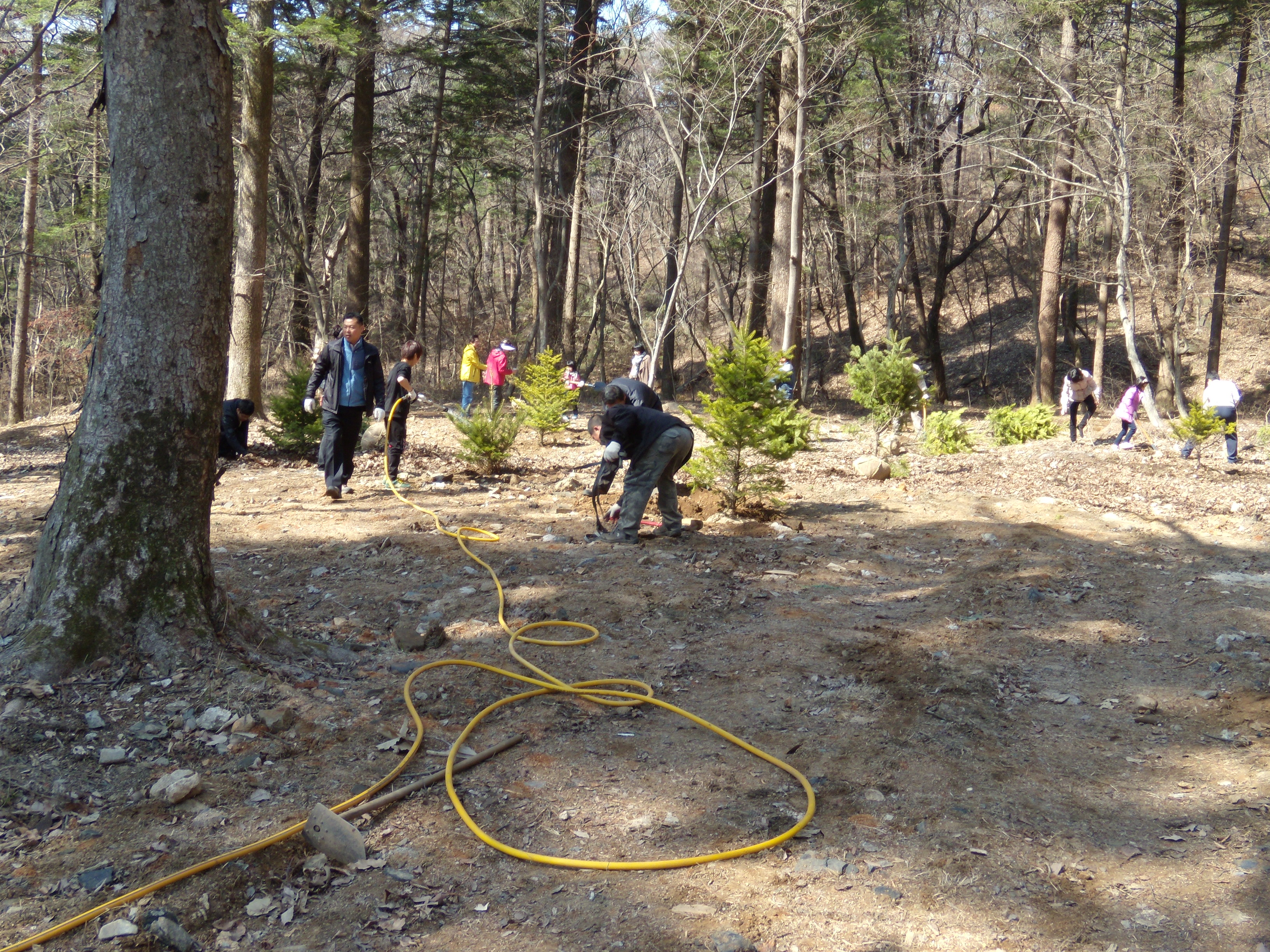
Arbor Day event at Gwangneung

=== Jeongjo Hyo Cultural Festival ===
Until 2011, the eoga procession to Yungeolleung (Yungneung and Geolleung), rites, and filial-piety-related events were held as part of the "Suwon Hwaseong Cultural Festival"; in 2011 they were separated under the name "2011 Jeongjo Filial Piety Cultural Festival." In 2012 the festival was held under the name "2012 Jeongjo Hyo Cultural Festival." The "2012 Jeongjo Hyo Cultural Festival," in addition to the eoga procession and ritual events, sought to honor Jeongjo's filial devotion to his father through programs such as a "crown prince education experience," which was more in-depth than earlier filial-piety events.

=== Joseon royal tombs pine-planting experience event ===
This is a small-scale event hosted by the Cultural Heritage Administration; every spring on Arbor Day, pine trees are planted in the forests around the royal tombs. About 7,000 geumgangsong (金剛松, Korean red pines) raised at the Sareung nursery managed by the Cultural Heritage Administration are planted, through the voluntary participation of citizens, in the forests of all the Joseon royal tombs, with the aim of reflecting on the value of the World Heritage Site and of nature.

== Damage and restoration ==
=== Damage ===
==== The case of damage to Jeongneung by Yi Bang-won (Taejong) ====
Yi Bang-won (Taejong), when he was still a grand prince, harbored a grudge over the fact that his stepmother Queen Sindeok had persuaded his father Taejo to pass over Bang-won and name her young son Bang-seok crown prince. After Yi Bang-won took the throne following the Strife of the Princes, in 1406 he cited the controversy that Jeongneung, being inside the capital, had an excessively large tomb precinct and permitted houses to be built beyond 100 bo (180 m). Powerful families then seized land around Jeongneung, and Ha Ryun even mobilized his sons-in-law. The retired king (Taejo) is said to have wept in secret at Jeongneung, around which the houses of powerful families were rising. After Taejo's death, Taejong demoted Lady Kang, Queen Sindeok from queen to concubine. As a result, Jeongneung was also demoted from a royal tomb (neung) to a tomb (myo) and relocated outside the capital to Yangju (present-day Seongbuk-gu), and its stone sculptures were used in the construction of Gwangtonggyo.

==== Damage by Japanese troops during the Imjin War ====
During the Imjin War, Japanese troops dug up the mounds of Seonjeongneung and burned the Jeongjagak and the jaegung. The Annals of the Joseon Dynasty state that all three jaegung at Seolleung and Jeongneung had turned to ashes, and at first it was presumed that the kings' bodies had been moved elsewhere; but before long burned bones were clearly found in the ashes of the jaegung at Seolleung, and when it was determined that a corpse found at nearby Songsan was very likely not Jungjong's, it was conjectured that the king's body had been burned. Together with the destruction of the royal ancestral shrine and altars after the Imjin War, this became a main basis for the argument against peace with Japan, and after the Jeongyu invasion, when Japan sued for peace, the court demanded that the culprits who had dug up Seonjeongneung be sent to Joseon in custody. However, the Japanese side had coerced prisoners from Tsushima, who had never even been to Seoul during the Imjin War, and brought them over in a semi-forced manner, and this was revealed in the process of interrogating them.

==== Damage by the government of the Republic of Korea ====
There is criticism that during the 1970s, under the Park Chung Hee government, the existing tomb system of Yeongneung was damaged by the so-called "King Sejong Sacred Site Project." A third path was added to the Chamdo of Yeongneung, which had originally consisted of two paths, although in the Joseon royal tombs a three-path Chamdo had existed only at Hongyureung, built in the form of an imperial tomb. In addition, granite was laid in place of the bakseok (thin paving stones) used on the existing Chamdo; on the east steps of the Jeongjagak, one more staircase was added in addition to the eogye (steps for the king) and singye (steps for the spirit); and the pine forest that had been around it was cut down and lawn planted, so that, unlike the other Joseon royal tombs, there is no dense forest around it. For these reasons it has been pointed out that the Park Chung Hee government lacked awareness of the harmony-with-nature value of the Joseon royal tombs.

In addition, the Korean Central Intelligence Agency (KCIA; now the National Intelligence Service) established itself inside Uireung. There was criticism that this damaged the basic tomb system of Uireung as a Joseon royal tomb and turned it into a recreational space for the KCIA: within Uireung, the tomb of a Joseon king of a dynasty that rejected Buddhism, a pair of stone pagodas was erected, a large pond was placed between them, and non-native plants were planted on the grounds. The KCIA managed Uireung after moving in. While the KCIA and its successor, the Agency for National Security Planning (ANSP), were there, public access was restricted, and it was opened to citizens only after September 1995, when the ANSP moved to Seocho-gu.

==== Damage caused by uncontrolled development ====
At Seooreung, some 100 restaurants proliferated illegally, disguised as illegal temporary structures or vinyl greenhouses, and the district office took enforcement action. In addition, issues were once raised concerning ranch facilities nearby. A golf course was built next to Donggureung, Korea's largest group of royal tombs, damaging the landscape; for a time there was much conflict over compensation. Besides these, military facilities built near Jangneung in Gimpo and in Yeongwol became a problem, and in front of Hongyureung a large wedding hall of a style not in keeping with the landscape of the royal tombs was built and a stream was covered over, so that the Geumcheongyo was severely damaged. The tombs of Jeongjo, Yungeolleung, were also the subject of a damage controversy in connection with the Taean 3 housing development district project in Hwaseong, Gyeonggi.

=== Joseon royal tombs restoration project ===
After the Joseon royal tombs were designated a World Heritage Site, the Cultural Heritage Administration announced that it would invest 490 billion won, through 2025, in restoring and redeveloping the Joseon royal tombs. The project consists of short-term work in response to UNESCO recommendations and long-term work to restore the tombs to the basic tomb system. Plans include demolishing and restoring facilities that have encroached even within the boundaries of the tomb precincts, such as Seosamneung, where a ranch has been established, Uireung, where the KCIA was located, and Taegangneung, where the Taereung Athletes' Village is located, and installing disaster-prevention facilities against fire and tomb robbery.

== Tombs ==
The tombs are classified into two types. The kings and queens (and those posthumously granted the titles) were interred in neung (陵; 릉)-type tombs. Crown princes and crown princesses were interred in won (園; 원)-type tombs. Other members of the royal family were interred in myo (墓; 묘)-type tombs.

The royal tombs are scattered over 18 locations, with many of them located as far as 40 kilometers from Seoul. For example, Jangneung is in Yeongwol, Gangwon Province, while Yeongneung is in Yeoju, Gyeonggi Province. Tombs were made for individuals as well as family groups.

Joseon-era royal tombs followed the guidelines outlined in Chinese Confucian texts, such as the Book of Rites and the Rites of Zhou. Many factors went into consideration when deciding the location of a tomb, such as the distance from the capital (present-day Seoul), the distance from other royal tombs, the accessibility, and pungsu (geomancy).

There now follows a list (in alphabetical order) of the individual (or clusters of) tombs. There are two more royal tombs from the Joseon era in North Korea, namely Cherung (제릉), which holds the remains of Queen Sinui, the first wife of King Taejo, and Hurung (후릉), which consists of the twin burial mounds of King Jeongjong and his wife, Queen Jeongan.

=== Donggureung (동구릉) ===
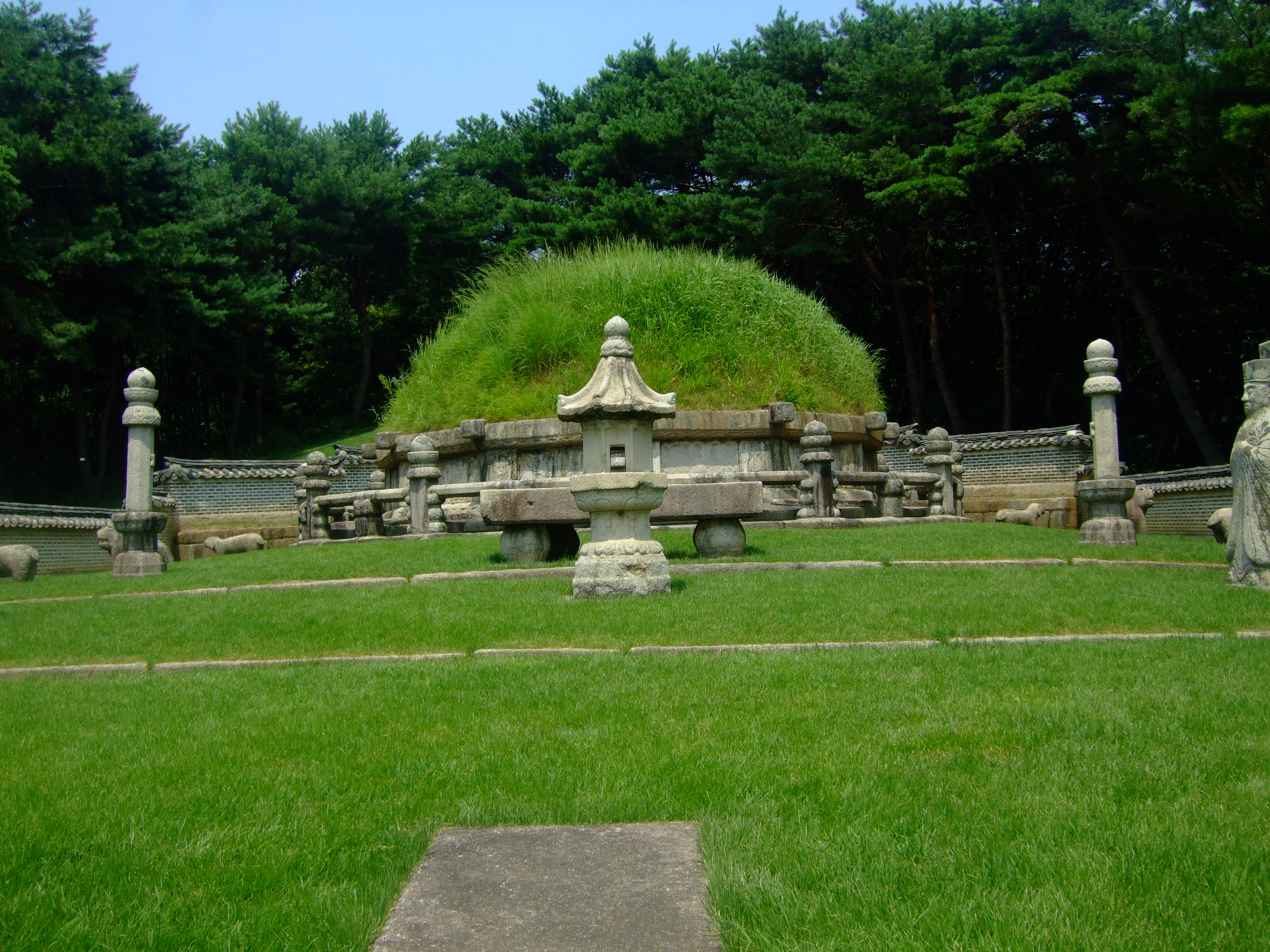
Geonwolleung

37°37′11″N 127°07′53″E

This cluster (lit. ''Nine Eastern Tombs'') is located on the west bank of the Wangsukcheon Stream in Guri, Gyeonggi Province. It is the best sample of cluster tombs from the Joseon era and represents the evolution of royal tomb architecture over a period of five hundred years. Seven kings and ten queens are interred in nine neung-type tombs. The most notable in this cluster is Geonwolleung (건원릉) for King Taejo, the founder of Joseon. Hyeonneung (현릉) consists of the separate burial mounds of King Munjong and his third wife, Queen Hyeondeok. Mongneung (목릉) consists of the separate burial mounds of King Seonjo and his wives, Queen Uiin and Queen Inmok. Hwireung (휘릉) holds the remains of Queen Jangnyeol, the second wife of King Injo. Sungneung (숭릉) consists of the twin burial mounds of King Hyeonjong and his wife, Queen Myeongseong. Hyereung (혜릉) holds the remains of Queen Danui, the first wife of King Gyeongjong. Wolleung (원릉) consists of the twin burial mounds of King Yeongjo and his second wife, Queen Jeongsun. Sureung (수릉) is the joint burial mound of Crown Prince Hyomyeong (posthumously honored as King Munjo) and his wife, Queen Sinjeong. Gyeongneung (경릉) (not to be confused with the royal tomb in Goyang) consists of the triple burial mounds of King Heonjong and his wives, Queen Hyohyeon and Queen Hyojeong. Myeongbinmyo (명빈묘) holds the remains of Concubine Myeong, a consort of King Taejong.

=== Gwangneung (광릉) ===
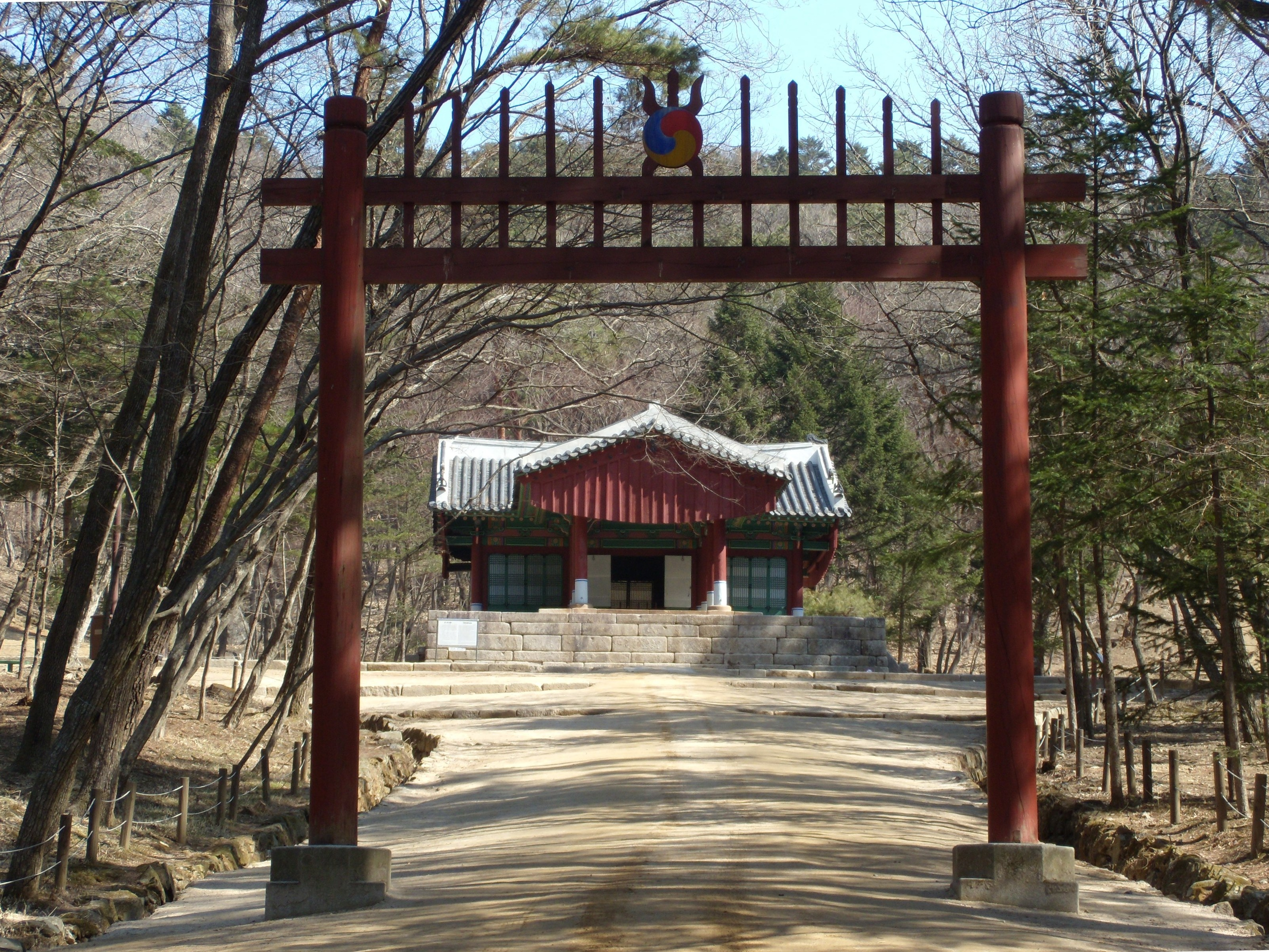
Gwangneung

37°45′08″N 127°10′38″E

This site is located in Namyangju, Gyeonggi Province. Consisting of separate burial mounds, it holds the remains of King Sejo and his wife, Queen Jeonghui. It is important due to the change taking place in royal tomb architecture, which is evident in its construction: screening rocks were not installed at this tomb; instead of an outer coffin stone, quicklime was used; another break from tradition is that the reverential access was not built; finally, only one shrine was built for both burial mounds. This change came from the last wishes of the king and reflects a new frugal style that influenced later royal tomb construction.

=== Heonilleung (헌인릉) ===
37°27′56″N 127°04′54″E

This site is located in the south of Seoul, at the bottom of the southern slope of Daemosan Mountain. Heolleung (헌릉) consists of the twin burial mounds of King Taejong and his wife, Queen Wongyeong. Situated two hundred meters to the west, Illeung (인릉) is the joint burial mound of King Sunjo and his wife, Queen Sunwon.

=== Hongyureung (홍유릉) ===
37°37′51″N 127°12′44″E

This site is located in Namyangju, Gyeonggi Province. The style of the two main tombs reflects the political changes experienced by Korea during the waning days of Joseon. With the declaration of the Korean Empire, the resting places of the last two rulers, Emperor Gojong and Emperor Sunjong, were designed to reflect imperial, rather than royal status. Hongneung (홍릉) (not to be confused with the royal tomb in Goyang) is the joint burial mound of Emperor Gojong and his wife, Empress Myeongseong. Yureung (유릉) is the joint burial mound of Emperor Sunjong and his two wives, Empress Sunmyeonghyo and Empress Sunjeonghyo; it is unique in that it holds the remains of three individuals under a single mound. Yeongwon (영원) is the joint burial mound of Yi Un (Crown Prince Uimin) and his wife, Yi Bang-ja (Princess Masako of Nashimoto).

=== Jangneung (Gimpo) (김포 장릉) ===
37°36′47″N 126°42′40″E

There are three Joseon royal tombs named Jangneung. This particular site is located in Gimpo, Gyeonggi Province, near the border with Incheon. Consisting of twin burial mounds, it holds the remains of Prince Jeongwon (posthumously honored as King Wonjong) and his wife, Queen Inheon; they were the parents of King Injo.

=== Jangneung (Paju) (파주 장릉) ===
37°46′25″N 126°42′29″E

This site is located in Paju, Gyeonggi Province, near the confluence of the Imjin and Han rivers, where the Osusan Observatory overlooks North Korea. Consisting of a joint burial mound, it holds the remains of King Injo and his first wife, Queen Inyeol.

=== Jangneung (Yeongwol) (영월 장릉) ===
37°11′51″N 128°27′11″E

This site is located in Yeongwol County, Gangwon Province, and is the furthest from the capital. It holds the remains of King Danjong.

=== Jeongneung (정릉) ===
37°36′08″N 127°00′21″E

Not to be confused with the royal tomb in southern Seoul. This site is also located in Seoul, but on the slopes of Bukhansan Mountain. It holds the remains of Queen Sindeok, the second wife of King Taejo.

=== Olleung (온릉) ===
37°43′13″N 126°57′04″E

This site is located in Yangju, Gyeonggi Province, just to the north of the Capital Region First Ring Expressway's Songchu Interchange. It holds the remains of Queen Dangyeong, the first wife of King Jungjong.

=== Samneung (삼릉) ===
37°51′33″N 126°47′06″E

This cluster (lit. ''Three Tombs'') is located in Paju, Gyeonggi Province. Gongneung (공릉), holds the remains of Queen Jangsun, the first wife of King Yejong. Sulleung (술릉) holds the remains of Queen Gonghye, the first wife of King Seongjong and Queen Jangsun's younger sister. Yeongneung (영릉) (not to be confused with the royal tomb in Yeoju) consists of the twin burial mounds of Crown Prince Hyojang (who was posthumously honored as King Jinjong) and his wife, Queen Hyosun.

=== Sareung (사릉) ===
37°38′50″N 127°11′51″E

This site is located in Namyangju, Gyeonggi Province, 1.6 km from Geumgok Station. It holds the remains of Queen Jeongsun, the wife of King Danjong.

=== Seonjeongneung (선정릉) ===
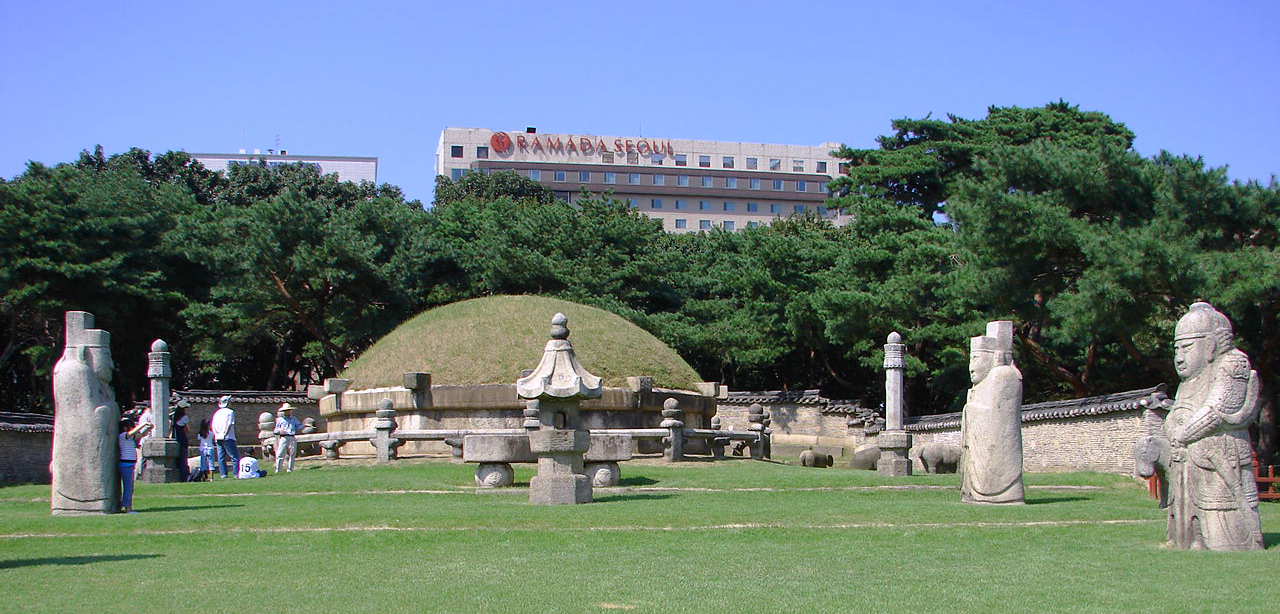
Seolleung

37°30′32″N 127°02′57″E

This site is located in southern Seoul, 0.34 km from Seolleung Station. Seolleung (선릉) consists of the twin burial mounds of King Seongjong and his third wife, Queen Jeonghyeon. Jeongneung (정릉) (not to be confused with the royal tomb on the slopes of Bukhansan Mountain, also in Seoul) holds the remains of King Jungjong.

=== Seooreung (서오릉) ===
37°37′33″N 126°53′55″E

This cluster (lit. ''Five Western Tombs'') is located in Goyang, Gyeonggi Province. Gyeongneung (경릉) (not to be confused with the royal tomb in Guri) consists of the separate burial mounds of Crown Prince Uigyeong (posthumously honored as King Deokjong), and his wife, Queen Sohye (better known as Queen Insu). Changneung (창릉) consists of the separate burial mounds of King Yejong and his second wife, Queen Ansun. Ingneung (익릉) holds the remains of Queen Ingyeong, the first wife of King Sukjong. Myeongneung (명릉) consists of the twin burial mounds of King Sukjong and his second wife, Queen Inhyeon, and the separate burial mound of his third wife, Queen Inwon. Hongneung (홍릉) (not to be confused with the royal tomb in Namyangju) holds the remains of Queen Jeongseong, the first wife of King Yeongjo. Sunchangwon (순창원) is the joint burial mound of Crown Prince Sunhoe and Crown Princess Gonghoe. Daebinmyo (대빈묘) holds the remains of Concubine Hui, a consort of King Sukjong and the biological mother of King Gyeongjong. Sugyeongwon (수경원) holds the remains of Concubine Yeong, a consort of King Yeongjo and the biological mother of Crown Prince Sado.

=== Seosamneung (서삼릉) ===
37°39′50″N 126°52′02″E

This cluster (lit. ''Three Western Tombs'') is located in Goyang, Gyeonggi Province. Huireung (희릉) holds the remains of Queen Janggyeong, the second wife of King Jungjong. Hyoreung (효릉) consists of the twin burial mounds of King Injong and his wife, Queen Inseong. Yereung (예릉) consists of the twin burial mounds of King Cheoljong and his wife, Queen Cheorin. Hoemyo (회묘) holds the remains of Queen Yun, the second wife of King Seongjong and Yeonsangun's mother. Sogyeongwon (소경원) holds the remains of Crown Prince Sohyeon. Uiryeongwon (의령원) holds the remains of Crown Prince Uiso. Hyochangwon (효창원) holds the remains of Crown Prince Munhyo.

The cluster encompasses over fifty tombs and serves as resting place for many other princes and princesses, as well as three of King Jeongjo's consorts (Concubine Ui, Concubine Won, and Concubine Hwa), and a consort of King Heonjong (Concubine Gyeong).

Additionally, monuments built to house the royal placenta and umbilical cords (known as taesil), which had once been scattered all over Korea, have also been gathered here.

=== Taegangneung (태강릉) ===
37°45′08″N 127°10′38″E

This site is located in eastern Seoul. Taereung (태릉) holds the remains of Queen Munjeong, the third wife of King Jungjong. Gangneung (강릉) consists of the twin burial mounds of King Myeongjong and his wife, Queen Insun.

=== Uireung (의릉) ===
37°36′13″N 127°03′25″E

This site is located in northern Seoul. Consisting of separate burial mounds, it holds the remains of King Gyeongjong and his second wife, Queen Seonui.

=== Yeongnyeongneung (영녕릉) ===
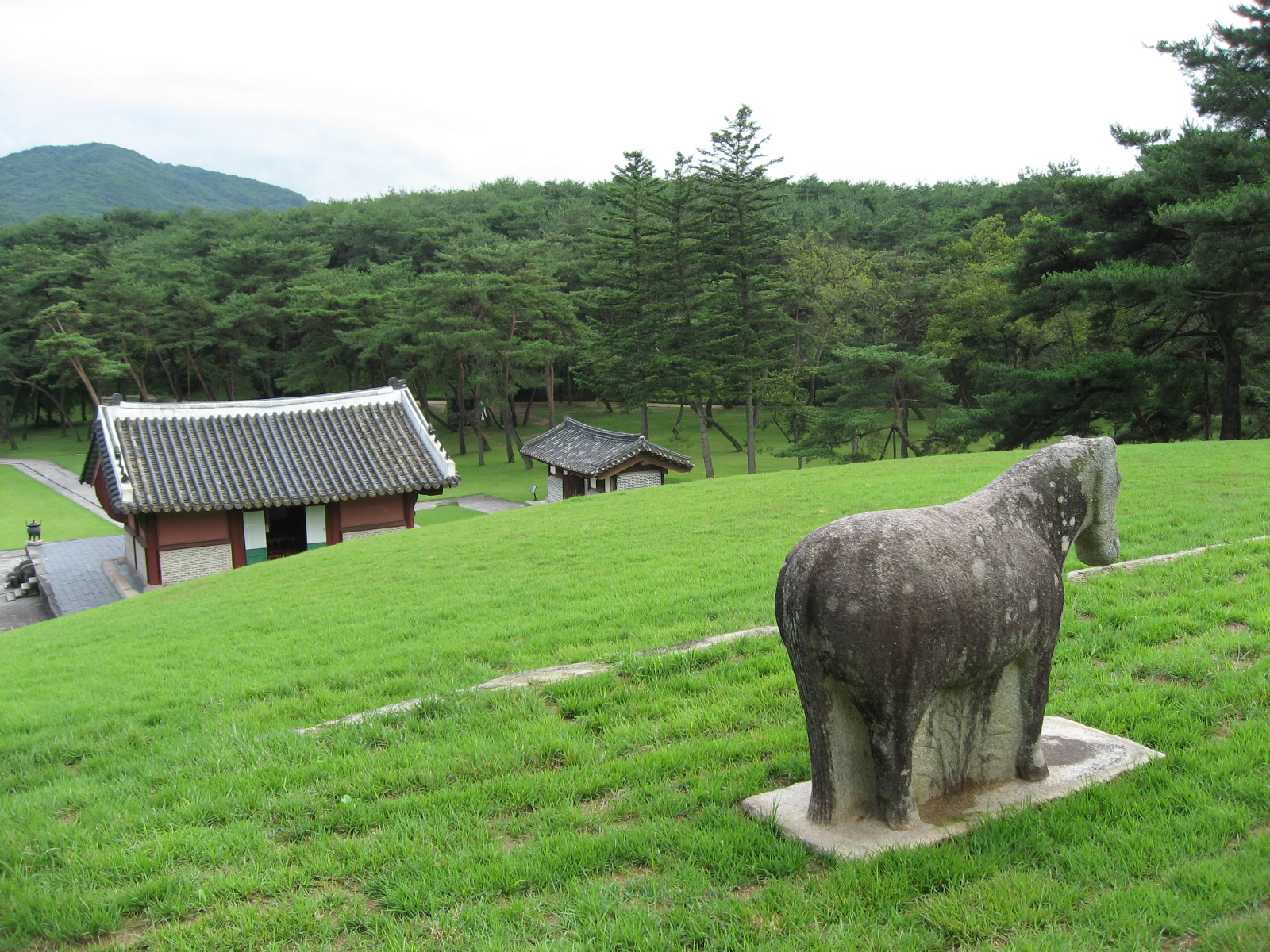
Yeongneung

37°18′25″N 127°36′11″E

This site is located in Yeoju, Gyeonggi Province. Yeongneung (영릉) (not to be confused with the royal tomb in Paju) consists of the joint burial mound of King Sejong and his wife, Queen Soheon. Nyeongneung (녕릉) consists of the separate burial mounds of King Hyojong and his wife, Queen Inseon.

=== Yunggeolleung (융건릉) ===
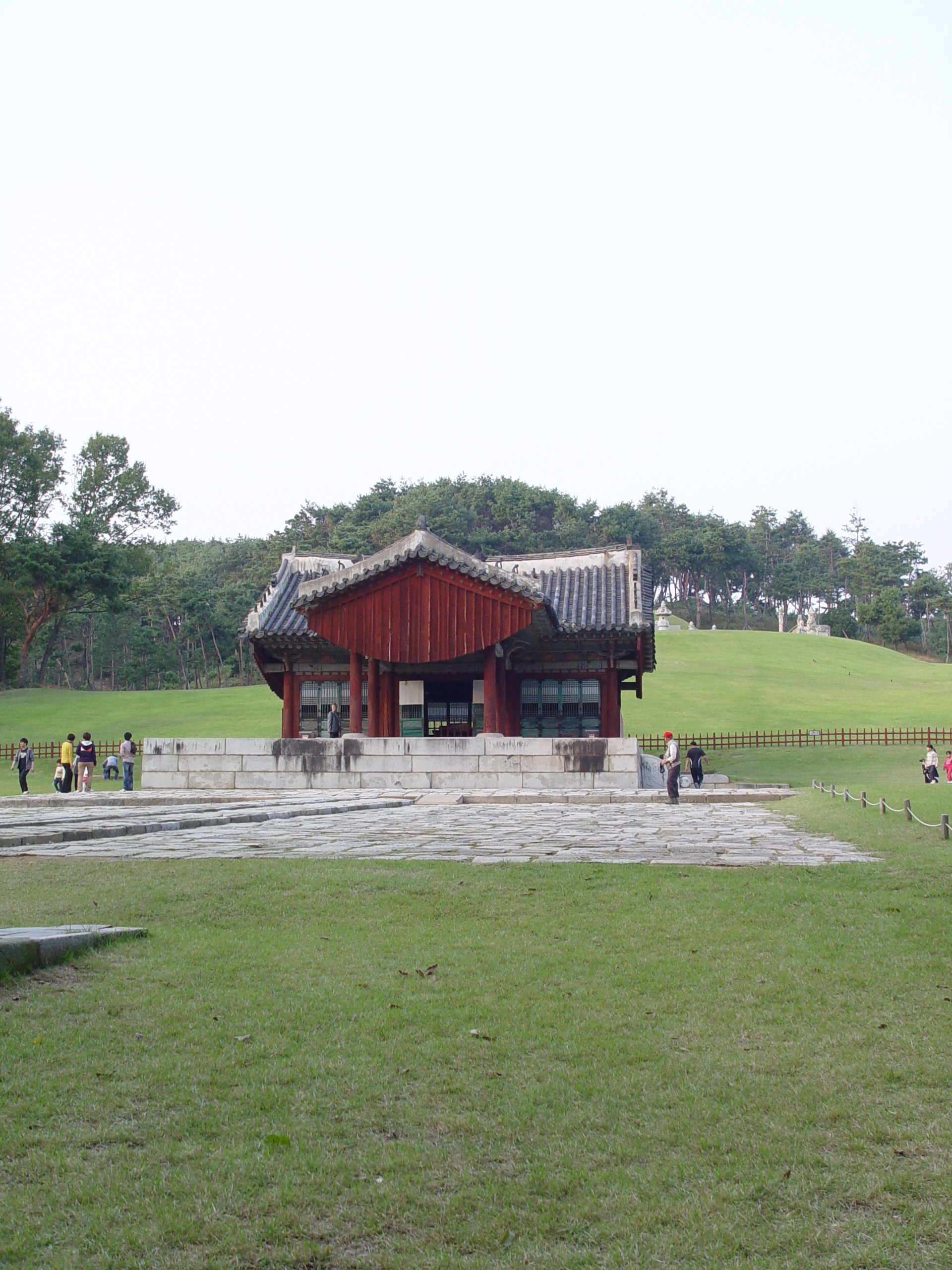
Geolleung

37°12′44″N 126°59′26″E

This site is located within a park in Hwaseong, Gyeonggi Province. Yungneung (융릉) is the joint burial mound of Crown Prince Sado (posthumously honored as King Jangjo) and his wife, Queen Heongyeong (better known as Lady Hyegyeong). Geolleung (건릉) is the joint burial mound of King Jeongjo and his wife, Queen Hyoui.

== See also ==
- Umbilical cord tomb of Taejo of Joseon
- Korea Heritage Service, responsible for the tombs' administration
- Annals of the Joseon Dynasty
- Hongsalmun
- Jaegung
- Jesa (ancestral rites) in Korea
