= Donggureung =

Royal tomb in South Korea

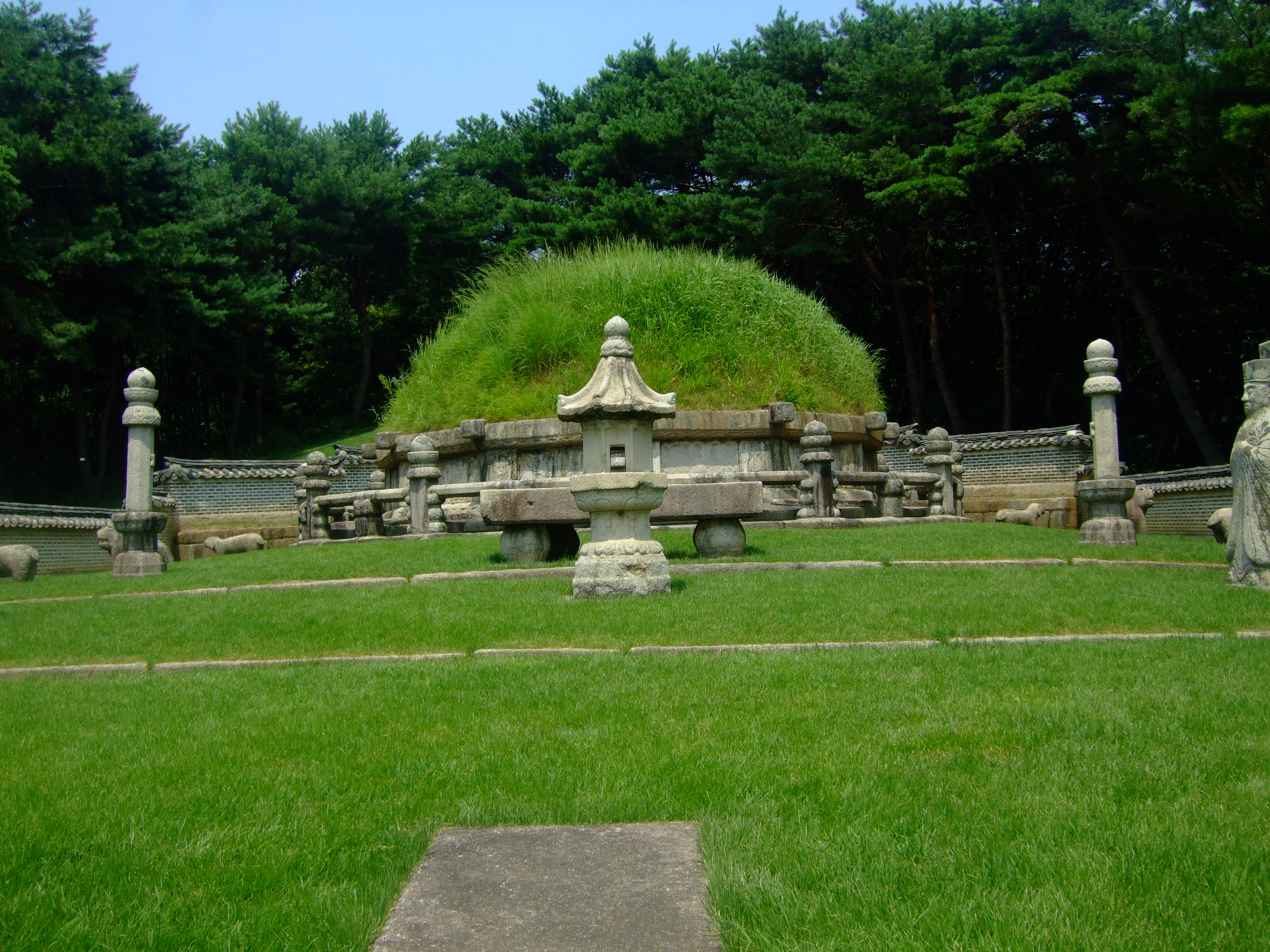
- Geonwolleung
- Interactive map of Donggureung
- 37.622608°N 127.132075°E
- Location: 197 Donggureung-ro, Guri, Gyeonggi Province

Site notes
- Area: 1,96 km²
- Governing body: Cultural Heritage Administration of Korea

UNESCO World Heritage Site
- Type: Cultural
- Criteria: iii, iv, vi
- Designated: 2009 (33rd session)
- Part of: Royal Tombs of the Joseon Dynasty
- Reference no.: 1319
- Region: Asia and Australasia

Historic Sites of South Korea
- Official name: East Nine Royal Tombs, Guri
- Designated: 1970-05-26
- Reference no.: 193

Korean name
- Hangul: 동구릉
- Hanja: 東九陵
- RR: Donggureung
- MR: Tonggurŭng

Donggureung (Korean: 동구릉; Hanja: 東九陵; lit. 'east nine tombs'), is a cluster of royal tombs from the Joseon dynasty, the largest of its kind in South Korea. 17 Joseon kings and queens are buried here. The cluster also houses a myo-type tomb (of a royal family member). It is located in Guri, Gyeonggi Province.

The construction was ordered by King Taejong in 1408 and the ninth tomb was placed there in 1855.

== List of tombs ==
| Tomb | Deceased | Year |
|---|---|---|
| Geonwolleung (건원릉) | King Taejo | 1408 |
| Hyeolleung (현릉) | King Munjong; Queen Hyeondeok | 1452 |
| Myeongbinmyo (명빈묘) | Concubine Myeong of the Andong Kim clan (King Taejong's consort) | 1479 |
| Mongneung (목릉) | King Seonjo; Queen Uiin; Queen Inmok | 1600 |
| Sungneung (숭릉) | King Hyeonjong; Queen Myeongseong | 1674 |
| Hwireung (휘릉) | Queen Jangnyeol | 1688 |
| Hyereung (혜릉) | Queen Danui | 1718 |
| Wolleung (원릉) | King Yeongjo; Queen Jeongsun | 1776 |
| Gyeongneung (경릉) | King Heonjong; Queen Hyohyeon; Queen Hyojeong | 1849 |
| Sureung (수릉) | Crown Prince Hyomyeong (posthumously King Munjo); Queen Sinjeong | 1890 |
Source: Cultural Heritage Administration
