= Queen Hyojeong =

Queen of Joseon from 1844 to 1849

Queen Hyojeong 효정왕후

Empress dowager of Korea
- Tenure: 13 October 1897 – 20 December 1903
- Predecessor: Title and Empire established
- Successor: Title and Empire abolished

Queen Mother of Joseon
- Tenure: 17 December 1894 – 13 October 1897
- Predecessor: Title established
- Successor: Queen Dowager Yi

Royal Queen Dowager of Joseon
- Tenure: 27 September 1857 – 17 December 1894
- Predecessor: Royal Queen Dowager Hyoyu
- Successor: None

Queen Dowager of Joseon
- Tenure: 25 July 1849 – 27 September 1857
- Predecessor: Queen Dowager Hyoyu
- Successor: Queen Dowager Myeongsun

Queen consort of Joseon
- Tenure: 1844 – 25 July 1849
- Predecessor: Queen Hyohyeon
- Successor: Queen Cheorin
- Born: 6 March 1831; Hamyeolhyeon, Jeolla Province, Joseon
- Died: 20 December 1903 (aged 72); Suindang, Gyeongun Palace, Hanseong, Korean Empire
- Burial: Gyeongneung
- Spouse: King Heonjong of Joseon (m.1844–d.1849)
Posthumous name
- 명헌대비; 明憲大妃; 명헌태후; 明憲太后; 명헌숙경예인정목홍성장순정휘장소단희수현의헌강수유령자온공안효정왕후; 明憲淑敬睿仁正穆弘聖章純貞徽莊昭端禧粹顯懿獻康綏裕寧慈溫恭安孝定王后
- Clan: Namyang Hong clan
- Father: Hong Jae-ryong
- Mother: Internal Princess Consort Yeonchang of the Juksan Ahn clan

Queen Hyojeong (Korean: 효정왕후; 6 March 1831 – 20 December 1903) of the Namyang Hong clan, was the second wife and queen consort of King Heonjong of Joseon, the 24th monarch of the Joseon Dynasty.

After his death in 1849, she was known as Queen Mother Myeongheon (명헌대비; 明憲大妃) and later Queen Dowager Myeongheon (명헌왕대비; 明憲王大妃) during King Cheoljong's reign. After the proclamation of the Korean Empire, she became known as Empress Dowager Myeongheon (명헌왕태후). She was posthumously called Hyojeong, the Accomplished Empress (효정성황후; 孝定成皇后).

== Biography ==
=== Early life and marriage ===
Lady Hong was born on 6 March 1831 into the Namyang Hong clan to Hong Jae-ryeong and Lady Ahn of the Juksan Ahn clan. She was the eldest within four children.

After the first young queen consort, Queen Hyohyeon, had died in 1843, Lady Hong was arranged to become new Queen Consort of Joseon after the mourning period ended. She married Heonjong at the age of 14 in 1844 where the marriage ceremony was held within the palace.

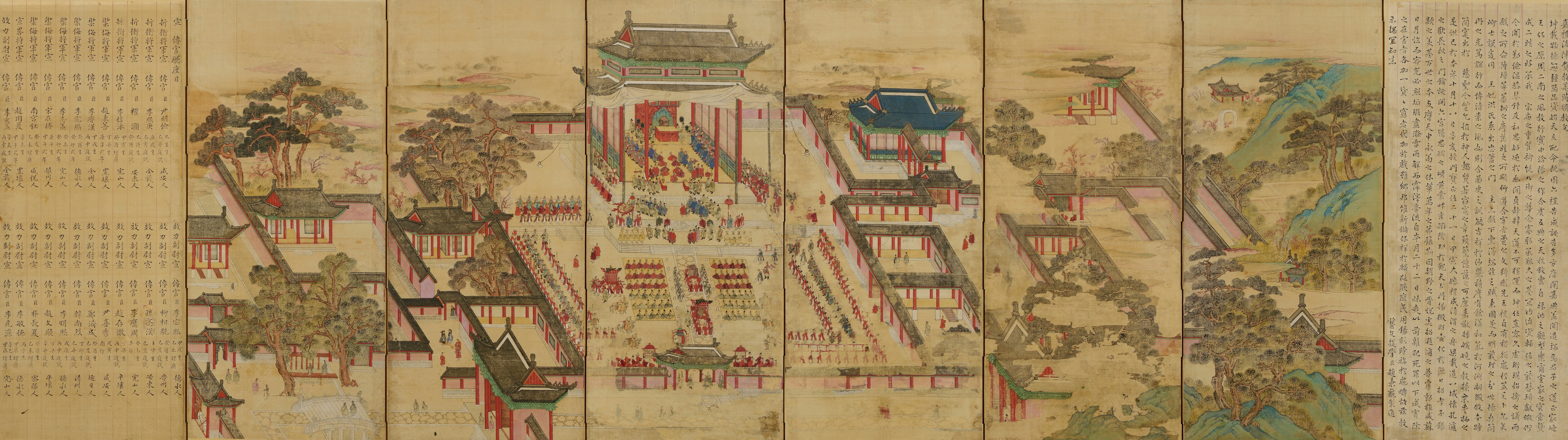
A folding screen which was depicted all the pomp and ceremony of a royal wedding of Heonjong of Joseon and Queen Hyojeong

As she was the king's wife, her mother was given the royal title of "Internal Princess Consort Yeonchang" (연창부부인; 延昌府夫人), and her father was given the royal title of "Internal Prince Ikpung" (익풍부원군; 益豊府院君). But her husband soon died in 1849 at the age of 21; leaving no heirs and making her Queen Dowager of Joseon at the age of 19.

=== Life as queen dowager ===
After Grand Queen Dowager Myeonggyeong's death in 1857, she was elevated to the rank of Queen Dowager.

Because the throne was vacant, this led to a distant relative, Cheoljong of Joseon, to take the throne in 1849, but then the king also died in 1864 leaving the throne empty. The Heungseon Daewongun then approached Queen Shinjeong, Cheoljong's legal sister-in-law, as he was a distant relative of King Injo and the adoptive son of Prince Eunsin.

The Heungseon Daewongun was ineligible to throne due to a law that dictated that any possible heir to the kingdom be part of the generation after the most recent incumbent of the throne, but his second son Yi Myeong-bok, was a possible successor to the throne. On 21 January 1864, Yi Myeong-bok was enthroned as Yi Hui, the King of Joseon.

Together with Queen Dowager Myeongheon at that time, it was said that she had worked with the Queen Dowager to take care of the younger court ladies in the palace to appease her own boredom. The Queen Dowager raised a young court attendant at the Dowager's residence. The court attendant's name was Cheon Il-cheong (천일청; 千一淸); who was supposedly the last court attendant from the Joseon Dynasty.

=== Later life ===
The Queen Dowager's mother-in-law, Grand Queen Dowager Hyoyu, died in 1890. Although she was the most senior royal member, she did not promote to Grand Queen Dowager and continued being Queen Dowager throughout the reigns of King Cheoljong and King Gojong.

It wasn't until Gojong's proclamation of the Korean Empire that the Queen Dowager became and held the title of being the empire's only Empress Dowager of Korea on 13 October 1897.

She later died on 2 January 1904 within the palace quarters of Gyeongun Palace, now known as Deoksu Palace, during the 7th year of Emperor Gwangmu's reign.

She was later given "Hyojeong" (효정; 孝定) for her posthumous title along with "Seong" (성; 成) added to it. She is sometimes called Queen Myeongheon (명헌왕후; 明憲王后) but her actual posthumous title is Queen Hyojeong.

Her tomb, Gyeongneung, is located in Donggureung, in the city of Guri, Gyeonggi Province, and is buried with her husband, Heonjong, and his first wife, Queen Hyohyeon.

== Family ==
- Father
  - Hong Jae-ryeong (홍재룡; 洪在龍; 6 November 1794 – 21 February 1863)
- Mother
  - Internal Princess Consort Yeonchang of the Juksan Ahn clan (연창부부인 죽산 안씨; 延昌府夫人 竹山 安氏; 1814–1883)
- Siblings
  - Younger brother: Hong Jong-seok (홍종석; 洪鍾奭; 1834–1870)
  - Younger sister: Lady Hong (홍씨; 洪氏)
  - Younger brother: Hong Jong-seon (홍종선; 洪鍾譱; 1854–?)
- Husband
  - Yi Hwan, Heonjeong of Joseon (8 September 1827 – 25 July 1849) – No issue.

== Notes ==
Preceded by Queen Hyohyeon	Queen consort of Joseon; 1844–1849	Succeeded by Queen Cheorin
