= Queen Uiin =

Queen of Joseon from 1569 to 1600

Queen Consort of Joseon
- Tenure: 18 December 1569 – 26 July 1600
- Predecessor: Queen Insun
- Successor: Queen Inmok
- Born: 15 May 1555; Hanseong, Joseon
- Died: 26 July 1600 (aged 45); Seokgeodang, Haenggung, (Note: Korean: 행궁; Hanja: 行宮; lit. ''Temporary Palace''; also known as "Jeongneung-dong Haenggung" (정릉동 행궁; 貞陵洞 行宮).) Hanseong, Joseon
- Burial: Mongneung, Donggureung Cluster, Guri, South Korea
- Spouse: King Seonjo (m. 1569)
- Issue Detail: 1 adopted son
Regnal name
- Jangseong (장성; 章聖) (Note: Known as honorific name (존호; 尊號) in the Sinosphere, its closest equivalent in the English-speaking world is the regnal name.)
Posthumous name
- Queen Hwiyeol Jeongheon Gyeongmok Uiin (휘열정헌경목의인왕후; 徽烈貞憲敬穆懿仁王后)
- Clan: Bannam Park (by birth); Jeonju Yi (by marriage)
- Dynasty: Yi
- Father: Park Eung-sun, Internal Prince Banseong
- Mother: Internal Princess Consort Wansan, of the Jeonju Yi clan
- Religion: Buddhism

Korean name
- Hangul: 의인왕후
- Hanja: 懿仁王后
- RR: Uiin wanghu
- MR: Ŭiin wanghu

Queen Uiin (Korean: 의인왕후; Hanja: 懿仁王后; 15 May 1555 – 26 July 1600), of the Bannam Park clan, was the first wife of King Seonjo, the 14th monarch of Joseon. She was queen of Joseon from 1569 until her death in 1600.

== Biography ==
=== Early life and lineage ===
The future Queen Uiin was born during the reign of King Myeongjong, as the younger child among one son and one daughter. Her father was Park Eung-sun (박응순) and her mother was a lady from the Jeonju Yi clan.

Her maternal grandfather, Yi Su-gap (이수갑), was a great-great-grandson of King Sejong and Han Hwak via Prince Gyeyang and his wife, Princess Consort Jeongseon (정선군부인), whereas her maternal grandmother was a great-great-great-granddaughter of Grand Prince Hyoryeong. As a member of the prestigious Bannam Park clan, Lady Park was also a third cousin twice removed of Queen Inseong, sharing Park Un (박은) as their common ancestor.

=== As queen ===
In 1569, at the age of 14, Lady Park married the 17-year-old King Seonjo. She possessed a benevolent and virtuous character, serving the dowager queens (Gongui and Uiseong) with devotion, but was unable to become pregnant. For this reason, she established Buddhist temples throughout the country to pray for children and made frequent donations to various temples, including Geonbongsa and Beopjusa.

When the Imjin War broke out in 1592, Seonjo fled to Uiju with Concubine In and Lady Park had to seek shelter alone in Kanggye. The royal party returned to the capital after its recapture, but she remained in Haeju until 1595.

Lady Park had previously taken Prince Imhae and Prince Gwanghae (henceforth known as Gwanghaegun) into her care after the death of their biological mother, Concubine Gong. Now she solidified her position as the mother and guardian of Gwanghaegun, who had been appointed as crown prince during the war.

Amid the second invasion in 1597, Seonjo once again fled with Concubine In, but this time, Lady Park followed Gwanghaegun to Suan.

=== Death ===
Lady Park's health deteriorated due to the strain of constantly moving from one place to another, and she died at the age of 45. She was buried within Mongneung (목릉), today part of the Donggureung Cluster in Guri, Gyeonggi Province. King Seonjo, who survived Lady Park by eight years, and his second wife, Queen Inmok, were later buried alongside her.

== Titles ==
- During the reign of King Myeongjong (r. 1545–1567):
  - Lady, of the Bannam Park clan (반남 박씨; 潘南朴氏; from 15 May 1555)
    - Park Eung-sun's daughter (박응순의 딸)
    - Lady Park (박씨; 朴氏)
- During the reign of King Seonjo (r. 1567–1608):
  - Queen (왕비; 王妃; from 18 December 1569)
  - Queen Uiin (의인왕후; 懿仁王后; from 1600)

== Family ==
- Father: Park Eung-sun (박응순), Internal Prince Banseong (반성부원군; 1526–1580)
- Mother: Internal Princess Consort Wansan (완산부부인), of the Jeonju Yi clan (전주 이씨; ?–1595); given name Su (수)
- Sibling(s)
  - Park Dong-eon (박동언; 1553–1605)
- Husband: King Seonjo (선조대왕; 6 December 1552 – 16 March 1608)
  - Biological father-in-law: Grand Internal Prince Deokheung (덕흥대원군; 2 April 1530 – 14 June 1559)
  - Adoptive father-in-law: King Myeongjong (명종대왕; 13 July 1534 – 12 August 1567)
  - Biological mother-in-law: Grand Internal Princess Consort Hadong (하동부대부인), of the Hadong Jeong clan (하동 정씨; 24 September 1530 – 24 June 1567)
  - Adoptive mother-in-law: Queen Insun (인순왕후), of the Cheongsong Shim clan (청송 심씨; 7 July 1532 – 22 February 1575)
- Issue
  - Yi Hon (이혼), Gwanghaegun (광해군; 14 June 1575 – 7 August 1641) — Adopted.

== Ancestry ==
Ancestors of Queen Uiin

Park Im-jong (박임종)
Park Jo-nyeon (박조년)
Lady, of the Yangcheon Heo clan (양천 허씨)
Park So (박소)
Yun Ja-seon (윤자선)
Lady, of the Papyeong Yun clan (파평 윤씨)
Lady, of the Byeokjin Yi clan (벽진 이씨)
Park Eung-sun, Internal Prince Banseong (반성부원군 박응순)
Hong Hong (홍흥)
Hong Sa-bu (홍사부)
Lady, of the Gwangju Yi clan (광주 이씨)
Lady, of the Namyang Hong clan (남양 홍씨)
Han Jeol (한절)
Lady, of the Cheongju Han clan (청주 한씨)
Queen Uiin
Prince Yeongwon (영원군)
Yi Cheol (이철)
Lady, of the Andong Kim clan (안동 김씨)
Yi Su-gap (이수갑)
Shim Bin (심빈)
Lady, of the Cheongsong Shim clan (청송 심씨)
Lady, of the Icheon Seo clan (이천 서씨)
Internal Princess Consort Wansan, of the Jeonju Yi clan (완산부부인 전주 이씨)
Kim Gyeom-gwang (김겸광)
Kim Geuk-pip (김극핍)
Lady, of the Samcheok Jin clan (삼척 진씨)
Lady, of the Gwangsan Kim clan (광산 김씨)
Yi Cheol-dong (이철동)
Lady, of the Jeonju Yi clan (전주 이씨)

== In popular culture ==
- Portrayed by Kim Yong-sun in the 1985–1986 MBC TV series 500 Years of Joseon: The Imjin War.
- Portrayed by Lee Hyo-chun in the 2003–2004 SBS TV series The King's Woman.
- Portrayed by Hwang Mi-seon in the 2004–2005 KBS1 TV series Immortal Admiral Yi Sun-sin.
- Portrayed by Im Ji-eun in the 2014–2015 KBS2 TV series The King's Face.
- Portrayed by Hwang In-young in the 2015 KBS1 TV series The Jingbirok: A Memoir of Imjin War.
- Portrayed by Kang Han-na in the 2016 JTBC TV series Secret Healer.

== Notes ==
Queen Uiin Bannam Park clan
Royal titles
Preceded by Queen Insun of the Cheongsong Shim clan	Queen Consort of Joseon; 1569–1600	Succeeded by Queen Inmok of the Yonan Kim clan
