= Queen Hyohyeon =

Queen of Joseon from 1837 to 1843

Queen Hyohyeon 효현왕후 孝顯王后

Queen consort of Joseon
- Tenure: 18 March 1837 (Note: In Lunar calendar) – 6 October 1843
- Predecessor: Queen Sunwon
- Successor: Queen Hyojeong
- Born: 27 April 1828; Gwangwang-bang, Ahnguk-dong, Hanseong, Joseon
- Died: 6 October 1843 (aged 15); Daejojeon Hall, Changdeok Palace, Hanseong, Joseon
- Spouse: King Heonjong of Joseon
Posthumous name
- 단성수원경혜정순효현왕후 端聖粹元敬惠靖順孝顯王后
- House: Andong Kim (by birth); Jeonju Yi (by marriage)
- Father: Kim Jo-Geun
- Mother: Internal Princess Consort Hanseong of the Hansan Yi clan

Queen Hyohyeon (Korean: 효현왕후 김씨; Hanja: 孝顯王后 金氏; 27 April 1828 – 6 October 1843) of the Andong Kim clan, was the first wife and the queen consort of King Heonjong of Joseon, the 24th monarch of the Joseon Dynasty. She was posthumously called as Hyohyeon, the Accomplishment Empress (효현성황후; 孝顯成皇后).

== Biography ==
Lady Kim was born into the (new) Andong Kim clan (신 안동 김씨; 新 安東 金氏) on 27 April 1828 in Gwangwang-bang, Ahnguk-dong at her mother’s home to Kim Jo-geun and Lady Yi of the Hansan Yi clan.

Through her father, Lady Kim was the 6th great-grandniece of Queen Inmok, was a seventh cousin of Queen Cheorin, and Queen Sunwon was her sixth cousin. Through her paternal grandmother, Lady Kim was the 4th great-granddaughter of Min Jin-hu, the eldest brother of Queen Inhyeon.

Lady Kim later became Queen Consort to the young King Heonjeong at the age of 10 in 1837. Her mother was given the royal title of “Internal Princess Consort Hanseong” (한성부부인; 漢城府夫人), and her father was given the royal title of “Internal Prince Yeongheung” (영흥부원군; 永興府院君).

In 1843, the young Queen died at the age of 15 within Changdeok Palace’s Daejojeon Hall without offspring. Her cause of death was unknown.

She is buried in Gyeongreung in Inchang-dong,Guri, Gyeonggi Province with King Heonjong and his second wife, Queen Hyojeong.

King Cheoljong added “Gyeonghye” (경혜; 敬惠) in 1851 and “Danseong” (단성; 端聖) in 1853. In 1866, King Gojong added “Suwon” (수원; 粹元), and finally in 1908 during King Sunjong’s reign, he posthumously made her empress and added “Seong” (성; 成).

== Family ==
- Father
  - Internal Prince Yeongheung, Duke Hyogan, Kim Jo-geun (영흥부원군 효간공 김조근; 永興府院君 孝簡公 金祖根; 1793–1844)
    - Grandmother: Lady Min of the Yeoheung Min clan (여흥 민씨; 1771–1847); daughter of Min Jong-hyeon (민종현; 1745–1798) (Note: He was the great-grandson of Min Jin-hu and his second wife. Min Jin-hu was the eldest brother of Queen Inhyeon.)
    - Grandfather: Kim Ji-sun (김지순; 金芝淳; 1772–1827)
- Mother
  - Internal Princess Consort Hanseong of the Hansan Yi clan (한성부부인 한산 이씨; 漢城府夫人 韓山 李氏; 1792–1844)
    - Grandmother: Lady Park of the Bannam Park clan (반남 박씨; 1774–1811); daughter of Park Hong-su (박홍수; 1753–1776)
    - Grandfather: Yi Hui-seon (이희선; 李羲先; 1775–1818)
- Siblings
  - Older brother: Kim Byeong-jib (김병집; 金炳潗; 1826–1869)
  - Older sister: Lady Kim of the Andong Kim clan (안동 김씨)
- Husband
  - King Heonjong of Joseon (조선 헌종; 8 September 1827 – 25 July 1849) — No issue.

== Notes ==
Preceded by Queen Sunwon	Queen consort of Joseon; 1837–1843	Succeeded by Queen Hyojeong
