= Yi Sung-deuk =

Korean royal family member (1775–1817)

Yi Seong-deuk 이성득
- Born: 1775; Hanseong-bu, Joseon
- Died: 27 November 1817 (aged 41–42); Ganghwa office, Ganghwa-do, Joseon
- Burial: Ganghwa County
- House: Yi
- Father: Prince Euneon
- Mother: Unknown woman (biological, Prince Euneon's concubine); Princess Consort Jeonsan (adoptive)
- Religion: Confucianism

- Yi Sung-deuk
- Hangul: 이성득
- Hanja: 李成得
- RR: I Seongdeuk
- MR: I Sŏngdŭk

Yi Seong-deuk (Korean: 이성득; Hanja: 李成得; 1775 – 27 November 1817) was a royal family member of the Later Joseon dynasty periods and a national offender. He was the son of Prince Euneon with a concubine. Prince Euneon was the son of Crown Prince Sado and the grandson of Yeongjo of Joseon. Yi Seong-deuk was the half-brother of Prince Sanggye, Prince Punggye and Prince Jeongye, who become the biological father of Cheoljong of Joseon. However, in 1817, he was tortured, causing death. The reason was unknown, as his family's records were destroyed by the Joseon government.

== Biography ==
Yi was born in 1775. His birthplace is unknown. Yi was the illegitimate son of Prince Euneon and an unknown concubine. Prince Euneon was the illegitimate son of Crown Prince Sado. Sung-deuk was not respectful treatment of royal families. His birth and the reign of his great-grand father King Yeongjo are known, but most of his lifetime evidence is destroyed; his early life and childhood are unknown.

His elder half-brother Prince Sangkye was born of his father's legal wife Lady Song of Sangsan and other his elder half-brother Yi Chang-sun and Yi Chang-deok was early death, Lady Song of Sangsan's born Yi Dang was his Younger Half brothers. his mother was one concubine of Prince Euneon, Lady Lee of Jeonsan was other concubine of Prince Euneon, born Yi Kwae-deuk. other Younger brother Yi Chul-deuk was obscurity to his mother. possibly Yi Chul-deuk was born to his mother or Lady Lee of Jeonsans.

In 1786, his elder half-brother Yi Jun, Prince Sangkye was adopted by the 22nd King Jeongjo, by Hong Kuk-yeong. Hong was making Crown prince. but King Jeongjo was twentys, Hong and Prince Sangkye was denounced as a traitor, after Prince Sangkye's original family was cop of Collective punishment. His father Prince Euneon and other family was exiled to Ganghwa-do. He was unmarried and had no concubines, so was childless.

He was uniplegic so one arm and one foot was paralytic, but don't get care of doctors. On November 27, 1817 he died from aftereffects of torture in Ganghwa County office, but his unknown also annihilate of more his records and related of Prince Euneon and Prince Sangkyes in ruled time of King Cheoljong and emperor Gojong times.

His death case was reported to king Soonjo, Uigeumbu was suggestions was request autopsy and king Soonjo was call shut one's eyes to faults.

On December 17, 1821, his mother (unknown lady) died from an unknown disease and cause. his burial town was unknown.

== Ancestry ==
Ancestors of Yi Sung-deuk

16. Sukjong of Joseon
8. Yeongjo of Joseon
17. Royal Noble Consort Suk-bin Choe
4. Jangjo of Joseon
18. Yi Yoo-beon, of the Jeonui Yi clan
9. Royal Noble Consort Yeong-bin Yi
19. Lady Gim
2. Prince Euneon
10. Im Ji-beon
5. Royal Noble Consort Suk-bin Im
11. Lady Kim of the Gimhae Kim clan
1. Yi Seong-deuk; 이성득

== See also ==
- Prince Euneon
- Jeongye Daewongun
- Prince Sanggye
- Yi Chul-deuk
- Yi Dang
- Cheoljong of Joseon

== Site link ==
- 의금부에서 강화 죄인 성득이 물고되었으니, 금부 도사를 보내 검험하라고 하다 조선왕조실록 (in Korean)
- 江華에 가두어 둔 죄인을 押送해 오거든 實情을 샅샅이 조사하겠다는 備邊司의 啓 한글 국역 비변사등록 (in Korean)
- 검색어 成得 : 총 36건 (in Korean)
