= Yongsŏng Pudaebuin =

Korean princess consort (1793–1834)

Grand Internal Princess Consort Yongsŏng
- Born: 20 July 1793; Yangdeok-bang, Hanseong, Joseon
- Died: March 1834 (aged 40); Joseon
- Spouse: Grand Internal Prince Jeongye (before 1831)
- Issue: Cheoljong of Joseon
Regnal name
- Grand Internal Princess Consort Yeongwon (Korean: 영원부대부인; Hanja: 鈴原府大夫人)
- House: Yongdam Yeom clan (by birth); House of Yi (by marriage)
- Father: Yeom Seong-hwa
- Mother: Lady Ji of the Sangju Ji clan

Grand Internal Princess Consort Yongsŏng (Korean: 용성부대부인 염씨; Hanja: 龍城府大夫人 廉氏; 20 July 1793 – March 1834), or Grand Internal Princess Consort Yŏngwŏn (영원부대부인; 鈴原府大夫人), of the Yongdam Yeom clan, was a member of Joseon's royal family as the secondary consort of Grand Internal Prince Jeongye. She was also the biological mother of King Cheoljong of Joseon and received her title after her son's ascension to the throne.

Her father and grandfather were commoners without government offices. There are no records about the siblings of her grandfather or father.

== Biography ==
=== Marriage ===
Lady Yŏm was a concubine of Yi Gwang (the future Grand Internal Prince Jeongye). Her life and relationship with Yi Gwang's first wife, Grand Internal Princess Consort Wanyang, is unknown, but from King Cheoljong's Annals of the Joseon Dynasty, we know that he made no difference in serving them when he was a child.

In 1831, Lady Yŏm gave birth to a son who was named Yi Wŏnbŏm (later became Cheoljong of Joseon).

=== Cheoljong's reign ===
After his enthronement, Cheoljong granted positions for his three maternal uncles and for his mother's ancestors to the 5th generation. Her great-grandfather was appointed as Minister of Government Administration, her grandfather was appointed as Right Chanseong and her father was appointed as Chief State Councillor. According to a legend in the Ganghwa region, Cheoljong gave 3,000 pyeong of land to his poor relatives.

During the reign of Emperor Gojong, her relatives, Yŏm Hokwan and Yŏm Chaehŭng, had served in the royal court.

=== Death ===
Lady Yŏm died in March 1834. Her tomb was first located in Hongeun-dong, Hanseong-bu, but in 1851 it was moved to Gyeongjwa, Dapdong-ri, Sudong-myeon, Yangju-gun, Gyeonggi Province, South Korea alongside her husband, Grand Internal Prince Jeongye, and his first wife, Grand Internal Princess Consort Wanyang.

The tomb was built by Kim Jwa-geun, younger brother of Queen Sunwon, and the epitaph was written by Yi Ha-eung, Grand Internal Prince Heungseon, who was the father of Emperor Gojong.

== Family ==
- Father: Yŏm Sŏnghwa (염성화; 12 July 1795 – ?)
- Mother: Lady Chi of the Sangju Ji clan (상주 지씨; 25 October 1791 – 20 July ?)

Siblings:

- Older brother: Yŏm Bogil (염보길)
- Unnamed older brother
- Older sister: Lady Yŏm (염씨)

Husband:

- Grand Internal Prince Jeongye (전계대원군; 21 March 1785 – 2 November 1841)
  - Father-in-law: Yi In, Prince Euneon (이인 은언군; 29 May 1754 – 30 June 1801)
  - Mother-in-law: Princess Consort Jeonsan of the Jeonju Yi clan (전산군부인 전주 이씨; 19 December 1764 – 4 June 1819)

Issue:

- Son: Cheoljong of Joseon (조선 철종; 25 July 1831 – 16 January 1864)
  - Daughter-in-law: Queen Cheorin of the Andong Kim clan (철인왕후 안동 김씨; 27 April 1837 – 12 June 1878)
    - Grandson: Prince Royal Yi Yung-jun (원자 이융준; 22 November 1858 – 25 May 1859)

== See also ==
- Grand Internal Prince Jeongye
- Grand Internal Princess Wanyang
- Cheoljong of Joseon
- Queen Cheorin
