= Yi Dang =

Korean royalty (1783–1826)

- Hangul: 이당
- Hanja: 李瑭
- RR: I Dang
- MR: I Tang

Yi Dang (Korean: 이당; Hanja: 李瑭, February 1, 1783 – May 8, 1826) was a member of the Korean Joseon Dynasty. Despite his royal lineage he did not receive a title during his lifetime, as his older brother was Crown Prince Sanggye and his mother, Princess Consort Sangsan of the Jincheon Song clan, his father, Prince Euneon, and his sister-in-law, Princess Consort Shin of Pyeongsan Shin clan, were charged and executed for treason during the Catholic Persecution of 1801.

== Early life ==
Yi Dang's birth father, Yi In, Prince Euneon, was an illegitimate son of Crown Prince Sado and Royal Noble Consort Suk of the Buan Im clan, a daughter of Im Ji-beon. He was later adopted by Prince Eunjeon, another illegitimate son of Crown Prince Sado and younger half-brother of Prince Euneon. Prince Eunjeon's mother was Royal Noble Consort Gyeong of the Park clan. His half-brother was Grand Internal Prince Jeongye, father of Cheoljong of Joseon.

Details of his childhood and early life are unknown.

His wife, Lady Kim of the Gwangsangun Kim clan had no issues. He had a son by his concubine, Lady Yi of the Jeonju Yi clan, named Yi Hui, who was adopted by his original full-brother, Crown Prince Sanggye, and ennobled as Prince Ikpyeong.

Long after his death, Yi Dang was honored as Prince Punggye (풍계군; 豐溪君).

Originally, his grave was in Dongmak-dong, Ansan, later moved to Dangjeong-dong, Gunpo, near his adoptive father, Prince Eunjeon's grave.

== Ancestry ==
Ancestors of Yi Dang

16. King Sukjong
8. King Yeongjo
17. Royal Noble Consort Suk of the Haeju Choi clan
4. Crown Prince Sado
18. Yi Yoo-beon
9. Royal Noble Consort Yeong of the Jeonui Yi clan
19. Lady Kim
2. Prince Euneon
10. Im Ji-beon
5. Royal Noble Consort Suk of the Buan Im clan
11. Lady Kim of Gimhae Kim clan
1. Yi Dang
24. Song Su-ryang
12. ?
6. Song Nak-hyu
3. Princess Consort Sangsan of the Jincheon Song clan
28. Gu Sung-pil
14. Gu Sun-won
7. Lady Gu of the Neungseong Gu clan

== See also ==
- Prince Euneon
- Prince Eunjeon
- Crown Prince Sangkye
- Yi Sung-deuk
- Cheoljong of Joseon
