= Wanyang Pudaebuin =

Korean princess consort (1804–1840)

Grand Internal Princess Consort Wanyang
- Born: 19 February 1804; Yeonji-dong, east of Hanseong, Joseon
- Died: 19 February 1840 (aged 36); Gyeonghaeng Hall, Hanseong, Joseon
- Spouse: Grand Internal Prince Jeongye (before 1830)
- Issue: Yi Myeong, Prince Hoepyeong
- House: Jeonju Choi clan (by birth); House of Yi (by marriage)
- Father: Choi Su-chang
- Mother: Lady Yi of the Gwangju Yi clan

Grand Internal Princess Consort Wanyang (Korean: 완양부대부인; Hanja: 完陽府大夫人; 19 February 1804 – 19 February 1840), of the Jeonju Choi clan, was a member of the Joseon royal family, as the legitimate wife of Grand Internal Prince Jeongye. As the primary consort, she became the adoptive mother of King Cheoljong of Joseon and was given the royal title after his ascension. She also bore Jeongye a son, Prince Hoepyeong.

== Biography ==
The future Grand Internal Princess Consort Wanyang was born on 19 February 1804 (4th year of King Sunjo's reign) in Yeonji-dong, as the daughter of Choi Su-chang and his wife, Lady Yi of the Gwangju Yi clan. Her paternal grandfather was Choi Jong-hyeong, who was an immediate descendant of Choi Sun-jak (최순작). Choi Sun-jak served as a general in the Goryeo period, and was one of the progenitors of clan. Her direct ancestor was Duke Pyeongdo (평도공; 平度公) Jukjeong Choi Yu-gyeong (죽정 최유경, 竹亭 崔有慶; 1343–1413), who served as a public servant in the late Goryeo for King Gongyang and King U, and for King Taejo, King Jeongjong, and King Taejong during the early Joseon Dynasty.

Lady Choi was said to have always been at ease despite difficult family circumstances and according to Cheoljong's Annals, she lived peacefully with Grand Internal Prince Jeongye's two concubines.

In 1830, when King Sunjo gave a special order to release members of Prince Euneon's family from exile, she and her husband were able to live in Hanseong again.

The Princess Consort died on her birthday, 19 February 1840 at the age of 36 in her husband's private residence, Gyeonghaeng Hall.

== Tomb ==
Her tomb was first located in Jungheung-dong, Hado-myeon, Yangju-gun, Gyeonggi Province, but was relocated to Seondan-dong and joined to Jeongye Daewongun's tomb on the right side. It was built by Kim Jwa-geun, Queen Sunwon's younger brother, in 1851 (2nd year of King Cheoljong's reign) along with her tombstone.

== Family ==
- Father - Choi Su-chang (최수창; 崔秀昌)
- Mother - Lady Yi of the Gwangju Yi clan (광주 이씨; 廣州 李氏)
- Husband - Yi Gwang, Grand Internal Prince Jeongye (전계대원군 이광; 29 April 1785 – 14 December 1841)
- Issue
  - Son - Yi Myeong, Prince Hoepyeong (회평군 명; 11 September 1827 – 6 September 1844)
    - Unnamed daughter-in-law
  - Adoptive son - Yi Gyeong-eung, Prince Yeongpyeong (영평군 경응; 20 July 1828 – 1 February 1902)
  - Adoptive son - King Cheoljong of Joseon (조선 철종; 25 July 1831 – 16 January 1864)
    - Adoptive daughter-in-law - Queen Cheorin of the Andong Kim clan (철인왕후 김씨; 27 April 1837 – 12 June 1878)
      - Adoptive grandson - Prince Royal Yi Yung-jun (원자 이융준; 李隆俊; 22 November 1858 – 25 May 1859)
