= Sugui Beom =

Joseon royal consort (1838–1884)

- Royal Consort of the Junior Second Rank
- Born: 3 September 1838; Joseon
- Died: 23 January 1884 (aged 45); Hanseong, Joseon
- Burial: Seosamneung Cluster, Goyang, South Korea
- Consort of: Cheoljong of Joseon
- Issue: Princess Yeonghye; Yi Yung-jun (raised)
- Clan: Geumseong Beom (by birth); Jeonju Yi (by marriage)
- Dynasty: Yi
- Father: Beom Won-sik

Korean name
- Hangul: 숙의 범씨
- Hanja: 淑儀 范氏
- RR: Sugui Beomssi
- MR: Sugŭi Pŏmssi

Sugui Beom (Korean: 숙의 범씨; Hanja: 淑儀 范氏; 3 September 1838 – 23 January 1884), of the Geumseong Beom clan, was a consort of Cheoljong of Joseon.

== Biography ==
Lady Beom was born into the Geumseong Beom clan as the daughter of Beom Won-sik (범원식).

Originally a palace lady, she became a royal consort after receiving the king's favor (승은), and in 1858, she gave birth to Princess Yeongsuk (영숙옹주), later known as Princess Yeonghye. After Cheoljong's death in 1864, she lived outside the palace with her daughter.

Lady Beom died during Gojong's reign, at the age of 46. She was originally buried in Hongeun-dong, Seodaemun District, Seoul, but in 1969, she was moved to the Seosamneung Cluster, in Goyang, Gyeonggi Province, the same location as the tombs of King Cheoljong and his wife, Queen Cheorin. On 26 May 1970, her tomb become the Historic Site No. 200.

Her daughter was the longest lived of Cheoljong's children. His other children died during infancy. However, her daughter also died in 1872, at the age of 14, without any issue.

== In popular culture ==
- Portrayed by Yoon Cho-hee in the 1975 TBC TV series King's First Love.
- Portrayed by Chae Si-ra in the 1990 MBC TV series Daewongun.
