= Kim Mun-geun =

Korean politician

- Hangul: 김문근
- Hanja: 金汶根
- RR: Gim Mungeun
- MR: Kim Mun'gŭn

Royal title
- Hangul: 영은부원군
- Hanja: 永恩府院君
- RR: Yeongeun buwongun
- MR: Yŏngŭn puwŏn'gun

Courtesy name
- Hangul: 노부
- Hanja: 魯夫
- RR: Nobu
- MR: Nobu

Posthumous name
- Hangul: 충순
- Hanja: 忠純
- RR: Chungsun
- MR: Ch'ungsun

Kim Mun-geun (Korean: 김문근; Hanja: 金汶根; 25 November 1801 – 6 November 1863), posthumously called Duke Chungsung (충순공, 忠純公), was a Korean nobleman and politician during the late Joseon Period. He served in various high-ranking positions at the court of his son-in-law, King Cheoljong. He was also the father of Queen Cheorin, primary wife of King Cheoljong.

He was one of the famous political figures who came from the Andong Kim clan and was a 7th degree nephew of Kim Jo-sun, Internal Prince Yeongan (김조순 영안부원군); the father of Queen Sunwon. When his daughter was chosen as Queen, he was honoured as Internal Prince Yeongeun (영은부원군, 永恩府院君).

== Biography ==
=== Early life ===
Kim Mun-geun was born on November 25, 1801, as the son of Kim In-sun (김인순) and his wife, Lady Shin of the Pyeongsan Shin clan (평산 신씨). He was the great-grandson of Kim Seong-haeng (김성행), who was executed for supporting Prince Yeoning during the reign of King Gyeongjong. He was later adopted by Kim Yi-sun (김이순).

Kim married Lady Yi of the Yeonan Yi clan (daughter of Yi Yong-su), but she died early, without any issue. She was later honoured as Internal Princess Yeonyang (연양부부인).

His second wife was Lady Min of the Yeoheung Min clan (daughter of Min Beon-hyeon). With her, he had one son and one daughter (the future Queen Cheorin).

=== Political career ===
In 1824, at the age of 23, Kim Mun-geun passed the civil service examination (Heungje) held by King Sunjo at Huijungdang Hall, ranking 3rd out of all examinees. This earned him the title of "Samha" (三下), a lower-level civil service rank. Despite not completing the required lower-level civil service examinations (Sangrye and Jinsa), he was granted the privilege of directly taking the highest-level civil service examination (Gwaje) due to his exceptional performance in the Heungje exam. He enrolled at Sungkyunkwan, the prestigious Confucian university, as a government-sponsored student (Gwanhak Yusaeng). In 1830, at the age of 29, he passed the civil service examination (Heungje) held by Crown Prince Hyomyeong at Chundangdae Hall. This remarkable achievement exempted him from taking the lower-level civil service examinations (Sangrye and Jinsa) and granted him direct access to the highest-level civil service examination (Gwaje).

In 1841, he entered government service through the "Eumsoo" system during the reign of King Heonjong. In March of that year, he was appointed as the supervisor of the Seonggungam Gagyeok, a government office responsible for managing the royal ancestral shrines. Due to illness, he stepped down from this position but was later appointed to various other posts, including Geumbujeongsa (Chief of Geumbu County), Haneungbu Panjeong (Chief of Haneungbu), Sajoeksa Ryeong (Chief of Sajoeksa), and Haneungbu Pungnyeojang (Governor of Haneungbu).

In June 1845, he was appointed as the magistrate of Gimhwa County. During his tenure, a stele praising his good governance was erected. In October 1846, his term as magistrate of Gimhwa County ended, and he was dismissed from his position.

In 1848, he was appointed to a military position and later became a Busikgwa (a mid-level official in the Ministry of Punishments). Following the accession of King Cheoljong, he was appointed as the Dongbu Seungji (Chief Secretary of the Eastern Bureau) in the Seungjeongwon (Royal Secretariat) in August 1851.

In 1851, upon his appointment as Dongbu Seungji (Chief Secretary of the Eastern Bureau) in the Seungjeongwon (Royal Secretariat), Kim Mun-geun underwent three rounds of selection (Chogantaek, Jaegantaek, and Samgantaek) for potential royal consorts. On August 24, Queen Sundeok decided his daughter would be the new queen and bestowed upon her the title of Wangbi (Queen Consort). He was temporarily transferred to the position of Hanbuhogyun (Commander of the Royal Guards) before being promoted to Gukgu (National Relative) on the 24th of the eighth lunar month. He was further elevated to the ranks of Jeongipum (Senior First Rank) and Bogeuksungrokdaebu (Grand Master of Meritorious Subjects) and appointed as Yeongdonnyeongbusa (Minister of the Office of Royal Relatives) and Yeongeunbuwongun (Count of Yeongeun).

Kim Mun-geun held a succession of high-ranking military positions, including Sanguiwonjejo (Chief of the Board of Censors), Geumwidaejang (Commander of the Royal Guards), Dansadaejang (Commander of the Navy), Chonyongsa (Minister of Ordnance), and again Geumwidaejang, Howie Daejeong (Commander of the Escort Guard), and Hwaldong Daejeong (Commander of the Training Corps). These positions allowed him to serve as a close advisor to King Cheoljong. Kim Mun-geun, along with Kim Jwa-geun and Kim Su-geun, emerged as prominent figures in the new power center of the Andong Kim clan. His appointment as Yeongdonnyeongbusa further solidified the clan's influence in the royal court. The Andong Kim clan enjoyed significant power and influence during this period.

In 1860, he faced criticism along with Kim Jwa-geun from the Count of Gyeongpyeong Yiho, the adopted son of Prince Punggye (King Cheoljong's paternal uncle) and his fifth cousin, according to the clan genealogy. This criticism led to Yiho's impeachment and punishment by Saheonbu Daesaheon Seo Dae-sun. Yiho was exiled to Gangjin in Jeolla Province, stripped of his military title, and expelled from his adopted position as the son of Prince Punggye. In the same year, Kim Mun-geun, along with Kim Jwa-geun, Kim Byeong-guk, and Kim Byeong-gi, were briefly expelled from the capital city. However, they were soon recalled by order of King Cheoljong. Despite the criticism and his brief exile, his political career remained strong. In December 1860, he was briefly appointed as the Governor of Gwangju-bu, but after just one month, he was reinstated as Yeongdonnyeongbusa (Minister of the Office of Royal Relatives). In 1861, he was again appointed as Sanguiwonjejo (Chief of the Board of Censors).

In 1862, when Lee Ha-jeon, Chief Secretary of the Office of Royal Relatives, was accused of treason after criticizing the powerful Andong Kim family, Kim Mun-geun filed an appeal requesting that Lee Ha-jeon be disposed of quickly. Kim Mun-geun's nephew, Kim Byeong-heon, formed a secret alliance with Heungseon Daewongun, promising to make Kim Byeong-heon's daughter the new queen in exchange for Heungseon Daewongun's support in placing his son on the throne. At first, Heungseon Daewongun agreed and succeeded in raising his son Gojong to the throne. However, upon gaining power, Heungseon Daewongun broke his promise to the Andong Kim clan, including Kim Mun-geun. The same year, he was appointed Bibyeonsadang Sang (Minister of Foreign Affairs).

=== Later life ===
Kim Mun-geun died on November 6, 1863, just one month before the death of his ailing son-in-law, King Cheoljong. He was criticized for wielding power solely based on his family's influence and lacking merit or ability. Despite these criticisms, he was a skilled calligrapher and personally composed the epitaphs for his mother-in-law, Jeon Sangungbuin Lee, and his father-in-law, Jeongye Daewongun. In addition, he was specially granted his full salary for three years after his death. On November 7, after his death, he was posthumously promoted to the rank of Yeonguijeong (Chief State Councillor) and concurrently Yeonggyeongyeon Hongmungwan Chunchugwan Seonggyungwan Gwan sanggamsae (Chief of the Office of Censors) with the royal title of Daegwangboguksungrokdaebu (Great and Bright Protector of the Country, Highly Esteemed Great Father). His tomb was located in Galhyeon, Gwacheon-gun, Gyeonggi-do, but was later moved to Chohyeon-ri 167–1, Daesin-myeon, Yeoju-gun, Gyeonggi-do, South Korea. His tombstone was written by Kim Byeong-guk (김병국) in January 1864.

== Family ==
- Great-Great-Great-Great-Great-Great-Great-Great-Grandfather
  - Kim Saeng-hae (김생해, 金生海)
- Great-Great-Great-Great-Great-Great-Great-Grandfather
  - Kim Geuk-hyo (김극효, 金克孝) (16 September 1542 - 3 February 1618)
- Great-Great-Great-Great-Great-Great-Great-Grandmother
  - Lady Jeong of the Dongrae Jeong clan (본관: 동래정씨)
- Great-Great-Great-Great-Great-Great-Grandfather
  - Kim Sang-gwon (김상관, 金尙觀)
- Great-Great-Great-Great-Great-Grandfather
  - Kim Gwang-chan (김광찬, 金光燦) (1597 - 24 February 1668)
- Great-Great-Great-Great-Great-Grandmother
  - Lady Kim of the Yonan Kim clan (본관: 연안 김씨)
- Great-Great-Great-Great-Grandfather
  - Kim Su-hang (김수항, 金壽恒) (1629 - 9 April 1689)
- Great-Great-Great-Great-Grandmother
  - Lady Na of the Anjeong Na clan (본관: 안정 나씨)
- Great-Great-Great-Grandfather
  - Kim Chang-jib (김창집, 金昌集) (1648 - 2 May 1722)
- Great-Great-Great-Grandmother
  - Lady Park (박씨)
- Great-Great-Grandfather
  - Kim Je-gyeom (김제겸, 金濟謙)
- Great-Grandfather
  - Kim Seong-haeng (김성행, 金省行)
- Grandfather
  - Kim Yi-jik (김이직, 金履直)
- Father
  - Kim In-sun (김인순, 金麟淳)
    - Adoptive uncle - Kim Yi-sun (김이순, 金頤淳)
- Mother
  - Stepmother - Lady Yi of the Hansan Yi clan (한산 이씨)
  - Stepmother - Lady Yi of the Jeonju Yi clan (전주 이씨)
    - Step-grandfather - Yi Gwon-su (이관수)
  - Biological mother - Lady Shin of the Pyeongsan Shin clan (평산 신씨)
    - Grandfather - Shin Il-sik (신일식, 申日式)

Siblings

- Older brother - Kim Jun-geun (김준근, 金浚根)
- Older brother - Kim Su-geun (김수근, 金洙根) (1798 - 1854)
  - Sister-in-law - Lady Jo (조씨); daughter of Jo Jin-Taek (조진택)
    - Nephew - Kim Byeong-hak (김병학, 金炳學) (1821 - 1879)
      - Niece-in-law - Lady Yun of the Paepyeong Yun clan (파평 윤씨)
      - Niece-in-law - Lady Yun of the Paepyeong Yun clan (파평 윤씨)
      - Niece-in-law - Lady Yi of the Seongju Yi clan (성주 이씨)
        - Adoptive grandnephew - Kim Seung-gyu (김승규, 金昇圭); son of Kim Byeong-yu (김병유, 金炳儒)
    - Nephew - Kim Byeong-guk (김병국, 金炳國) (1825 - 1905)
      - Adoptive grandnephew - Kim Jeong-gyu (김정규, 金貞圭); son of Kim Byeong-mun (김병문, 金炳聞)

Wives and their issue(s)

- Internal Princess Consort Yeonyang of the Yeonan Yi clan (연양부부인 연안 이씨, 延陽府夫人 延安 金氏) (1799 - 1824) — No issue.
- Internal Princess Consort Heungyang of the Yeoheung Min clan (흥양부부인 여흥 민씨, 興陽府夫人 驪興 閔氏) (? - 1872)
  - Daughter - Queen Cheorin of the Andong Kim clan (27 April 1837 - 12 June 1878) (철인왕후 안동 김씨)
    - Son-in-law - Cheoljong of Joseon (25 July 1831 - 16 January 1864) (조선 철종왕)
      - Grandson - Prince Royal Yi Yong-jun (22 November 1858 - 25 May 1859) (원자 이융준)
  - Son - Kim Byeong-pil (김병필, 金炳弼) (1839 - 1870)
    - Grandson - Kim Heung-gyu (김흥규, 金興圭)
      - Great-Grandson - Kim Yong-jin (김용진, 金容鎭); adopted by Kim Jeong-Gyu (김정규)

== In popular culture ==
- Portrayed by Jeon Bae-soo in the 2020 TVN TV series Mr. Queen.

== See also ==
- Cheoljong of Joseon
- Queen Cheorin
- Kim Jwa-Geun
- Mr. Queen
