= Princess Yeonghye =

Princess of Joseon (1858–1872)

Princess Yeonghye 영혜옹주
- Princess of Joseon
- Born: 1858; Jongno District, Hanseong, Joseon
- Died: 4 July 1872 (aged 14); Joseon
- Spouse: Park Yung-hyo, Prince Consort Geumneung (m. 1872)
- House: House of Yi (by birth); Bannam Park (by marriage)
- Father: Cheoljong of Joseon
- Mother: Royal Consort Suk-ui of the Geumseong Beom clan

Princess Yeonghye (Korean: 영혜옹주; Hanja: 永惠翁主, 1858 – 4 July 1872) or firstly honoured as Princess Yeongsuk (영숙옹주; 永淑翁主), was the daughter and only surviving female descendant of Yi Byeon, King Cheoljong of Joseon, from his consort, Lady Beom.

== Biography ==
The princess was born in 1858 during her father's 9th year of reign. She was first honoured as Princess Yeongsuk (영숙옹주; 永淑翁主), but in 1866 her title was changed to Princess Yeonghye (영혜옹주; 永惠翁主).

After her father's death, on January 16, 1864, she lived outside the palace with her mother. The Princess married Park Yung-hyo (박영효), son of Park Won-yang (박원양), on April 13, 1872, but she died three months later.

== Family ==
- Father: Yi Won-beom, King Cheoljong (조선 철종; 25 July 1831 – 16 January 1864)
  - Grandfather: Yi Gwang, Grand Internal Prince Jeongye (전계대원군 이광; 29 April 1785 – 14 December 1841)
  - Grandmother: Grand Internal Princess Consort Yongseong of the Yongdam Yeom clan (용성부대부인 용담 염씨; 20 July 1793 – March 1834)
- Mother: Royal Consort Suk-ui of the Geumseong Beom clan (숙의 범씨; 1838–1883)
  - Grandfather: Beom Won-sik (범원식; 范元植)
- Husband:
  - Park Yeong-hyo, Prince Consort Geumreung of the Bannam Park clan (박영효; 朴泳孝; 12 June 1861 – 21 September 1939); third son of Park Won-yang
