= Prince Yeongpyeong =

Korean royal prince

- Hangul: 이경응
- Hanja: 李景應
- RR: I Gyeongeung
- MR: I Kyŏngŭng

Royal title
- Hangul: 영평군
- Hanja: 永平君
- RR: Yeongpyeonggun
- MR: Yŏngp'yŏnggun

Posthumous name
- Hangul: 효정
- Hanja: 孝貞
- RR: Hyojeong
- MR: Hyojŏng

Prince Yeongpyeong (Korean: 영평군; Hanja: 永平君; 30 August 1828 – 1 February 1902 (Note: In the Korean calendar (lunar), he died on 23rd days 12th months in the sinchuk year (1901).)), personal name Yi Gyeong-eung (이경응; 李景應), was a member of the Royal Jeonju Yi clan, as the second son of Grand Internal Prince Jeongye, and the second eldest half-brother of Cheoljong of Joseon. He was the last surviving great-great-grandson of Yeongjo of Joseon. (Note: Excluding non-royalty descendants through female line, as well as those could be counted due to adoptions within the clan.)

== Biography ==
The future Prince Yeongpyeong was born on August 20, 1828 (on the 20th day of the 7th month in the Korean calendar), as the second son of Yi Gwang (Jeongye Daewongun), by one of his concubines, Lady Yi. He was born as Yi Won-hui (이원희; 李元羲) and a commoner.

In 1844, because of Min Jin-yong's plot, he was exiled to Ganghwa Island along with his younger half-brother (the future King Cheoljong of Joseon).

After Cheoljong ascended to the throne in 1849, Yi Won-hui was renamed Yi Uk (이욱; 李昱) and received the royal title, Prince Yeongpyeong. Throughout the reign of Cheoljong, Prince Yeongpyeong remained childless despite marrying twice.

King Cheoljong died in 1864 and was succeeded by King Gojong. In that same year, Yi Sun-dal (later renamed Yi Jae-sun) was chosen to be the heir of Prince Yeongpyeong, who was a key member of Jeongye Daewongun's family, but suffered from a chronic disease and had no male heir. In 1868, there was an order requiring all descendants of Deokheung Daewongun (whose son ascended to the throne in 1567, known as Seonjo of Joseon), one of the closest relatives to the Royal Family, to rename, based on a unified sequence of generation name used in the said cadet branch; therefore, Prince Yeongpyeong was renamed again to Yi Gyeong-eung (이경응; 李景應).

He also hosted two royal weddings: firstly, for Princess Yeonghye (his niece, daughter of Cheoljong), in 1872, and secondly, for Yi Kang, Prince Uihwa (5th son of Gojong), in 1893.

Yi Jae-sun, Prince Yeongpyeong's adopted son, was childless as well, so he adopted Yi Han-yong (a descendant of Crown Prince Sohyeon) as his heir, but the later died young, in 1890.

In 1897, Prince Yeongpyeong chose a distant relative, Yi In-bong (later renamed Yi Hae-seung) to be the heir to his late grandson; the request was approved by Gojong, who declared himself to be the Emperor of the Korean Empire in the same year. Due to the frequent adoptions within the clan, Yi Hae-seung was by birth registered as a descendant of Deokheung Daewongun, but his actual ancestry could be traced back to Grand Prince Wolsan, making him a 13th cousin three times removed to Prince Yeongpyeong.

In 1899, as Crown Prince Sado was elevated to "Emperor Jangjo", Yi Jae-sun received the royal title "Prince Cheongan".

Prince Yeongpyeong died on February 1, 1902, age 73. Prince Cheongan died in 1904, and Yi Hae-seung received the title "Prince Cheongpung" in 1910.

== Family ==
- Spouses and their respective issue:
1. Lady Shin of the Pyeongsan Shin clan (평산 신씨, 17 August 1832 – 30 May 1857), daughter of Shin Jae-jun (신재준). She was also a grandniece of Shin Gwang-su, Prince Consort Yeongseong (husband of Princess Hwahyeop, the seventh daughter of King Yeongjo). She had no issue.
2. Lady Kim of the Cheongdo Kim clan (청도 김씨, 6 May 1839 – 1921), the second daughter of Kim Jae-won (김재원). She had a daughter.
  - Daughter: Lady Yi of the Jeonju Yi clan (21 April 1866 – 27 May 1913)
  - Son-in-law: Hwang Yeon-su (황연수, 16 May 1866 – 5 September 1949) of the Changwon Hwang clan (창원 황씨). Through his great-grandmother, a 9th-great-granddaughter of Deokheung Daewongun, he was a third cousin of Gojong and Min Young-hwan.
    - Granddaughter: Lady Hwang of the Changwon Hwang clan (b. 1884). She married Shim Seung-taek (심승택) of the Cheongsong Shim clan, having two sons and three daughters.
    - Grandson: Hwang Gyu-seong (황규성, 6 September 1893 – 27 December 1949). He had three sons.
    - Granddaughter: Lady Hwang of the Changwon Hwang clan (5 December 1894 – 22 May 1914). She married Min Hong-sik (민홍식) of the Yeoheung Min clan, second son of Min Yeong-chan, as his first wife; she had no issue.
    - Granddaughter: Lady Hwang of the Changwon Hwang clan (21 March 1898 – 7 February 1951). She married Yun Seol (윤설) of the Namwon Yun clan and had issue.
  - Adopted son: Yi Jae-sun, Prince Cheongan (청안군 이재순, 16 December 1851 – 2 March 1904). By birth the son of Yi Hwi-eung, who was a descendant of King Seonjo and 9th cousin of Prince Yeongpyeong.
  - Adopted daughter-in-law: Lady Hong of the Pungsan Hong clan (풍산 홍씨, 21 April 1853 – 6 February 1927), the third daughter of Hong Gyeong-mo (홍경모), a 4th-great-grandson of Princess Jeongmyeong. She was also a grandaunt of Empress Sunjeong.
    - Adopted grandson: Yi Han-yong (이한용, 26 March 1875 – 14 September 1890). By birth a descendant of Crown Prince Sohyeon and died young; posthumously honoured as "Prince Pungseon" (풍선군) in 1907.
    - Adopted granddaughter-in-law: Lady Hong of the Namyang Hong clan (남양 홍씨, 24 July 1875 – 23 April 1951), daughter of Hong Sun-guan (홍순관).
      - Adopted great-grandson: Yi Hae-seung, Prince Cheongpung (청풍군 이해승, b. 7 August 1890). By birth a descendant of Grand Prince Wolsan. During the Japanese rule he accepted the title of "Marquis"; he was later captured by Korean People's Army during the Korean War in 1950 and was presumed dead as of 1959.

=== Ancestors and descendants ===
Prince Yeongpyeong's Ancestry

(1438–1457); Crown Prince Uigyeong
(1454–1488); Grand Prince Wolsan	(1457–1494); King Seongjong
(1485–1506); Prince Deokpung	(1488–1544); King Jungjong
(1500–1541); Prince Parim	(1530–1559); Deokheung Daewongun
(1535–1591); Prince Yangcheon	(1552–1608); King Seonjo
(1562–1599); Yi Ho-in	(1580–1619); Prince Jeongwon	(1596–1644); Prince Gyeongchang
(1591–1653); Yi Hui-mang	(1595–1649); King Injo	(1638–1704); Prince Changheung
(1611–1687); Yi Seok-beom	(1612–1645); Crown Prince Sohyeon	(1619–1659); King Hyojong	(1665–1718); Prince Gopyeong
(1632–1711); Yi Gang	(1644–1665); Prince Gyeongan	(1641–1674); King Hyeonjong	(1696–1754); Prince Yeoneun
(1657–1716); Yi Ha-seok	(1663–1724); Prince Imchang	(1661–1720); King Sukjong	(1718–1744); Yi Gi-bin
(1676–1750); Yi Sa-heung	(1688–1729); Prince Milpung	(1694–1776); King Yeongjo	(1740–1777); Yi Gyeong
(1702–1764); Yi Sang-geun	(1716–1744); Yi Hang-seok	(1735–1762); Crown Prince Sado	(1772–1799); Yi Yu-il
(1743–1802); Yi Hui-sun	(1741–?); Yi Won-hyeong	(1754–1801); Prince Euneon	(1794–1831); Yi Myeong-cho
(1778–1836); Yi Yeong-gyu	(1781–1841); Yi Jeong-hyeon	(1785–1841); Jeongye Daewongun	(1811–1857); Yi Do-geuk
(1810–1867); Yi Seok-hyeon	(1815–1875); Yi Gyeong-eung	(1828–1902); Yi Gyeong-eung, Prince Yeongpyeong	(1834–1895); Yi Hwi-eung
(1842–?); Yi Jae-suk	(1848–1910); Yi Jae-cheol	(1866–1913); Lady Yi of the Jeonju Yi clan	(1851–1904); Yi Jae-sun, Prince Cheongan
(1870–?); Yi Geon-yong	(1875–1890); Yi Han-yong, Prince Pungseon
(1890–?); Yi Hae-seung, Prince Cheongpung

== In popular culture ==
- Portrayed by Park Young-kyu in the 1990 MBC TV series Daewongun.
- Portrayed by Yoo Min-kyu in the 2020 tvN TV series Mr. Queen.
