= Prince Hoepyeong =

Korean royal prince

- Hangul: 이원경
- Hanja: 李元慶
- RR: I Wongyeong
- MR: I Wŏn'gyŏng

Royal title
- Hangul: 회평군
- Hanja: 懷平君
- RR: Hoepyeonggun
- MR: Hoep'yŏnggun

Prince Hoepyeong (Korean: 회평군; Hanja: 懷平君, 11 September 1827 – 6 September 1844), personal name Yi Won-gyeong (이원경; 李元慶) or Yi Myeong (이명; 李明), was a member of the Joseon Royal Family as the only son of Grand Internal Prince Jeongye and Grand Internal Princess Consort Wanyang of the Jeonju Choi clan. He was also the eldest half-brother of Cheoljong of Joseon and the oldest grandson of Prince Euneon.

He later married Lady Choi (부인 최씨), but had no issue.
