= Sugui Bang =

Joseon royal consort (fl. 19th century)

- Royal Consort of the Junior Second Rank
- Born: Before 1840; Joseon
- Died: 6 November 1878; Hanseong, Joseon
- Burial: Seosamneung Cluster, Goyang, South Korea
- Consort of: Cheoljong of Joseon
- Issue: 2 daughters
- Clan: Onyang Bang (by birth); Jeonju Yi (by marriage)
- Dynasty: Yi

Korean name
- Hangul: 숙의 방씨
- Hanja: 淑儀方氏
- RR: Sugui Bangssi
- MR: Sugŭi Pangssi

Sugui Bang (Korean: 숙의 방씨; Hanja: 淑儀 方氏; ? – 6 November 1878), of the Onyang Bang clan, was a consort of Cheoljong of Joseon.

== Biography ==
In 1850, Lady Bang gave birth to her first daughter, who died four years later. In 1853, she gave birth to a second daughter, but she too died soon after.

When Lady Bang died in 1878, during Gojong's reign, she was first buried in Hawolgok-dong, Seongbuk District, Seoul, but in 1969, her tomb was moved to the Seosamneung Cluster, in Goyang, Gyeonggi Province. On 26 May 1970, her tomb become the Historic Site No. 200.

== In popular culture ==
- Portrayed by Lee Min-ah in the 1975 TBC TV Series King's First Love.
