= Gwiin Park (Cheoljong) =

Joseon royal consort (1827–1889)

- Royal Consort of the Junior First Rank
- Born: 1827; Joseon
- Died: 27 April 1889 (aged 61–62); Hanseong, Joseon
- Burial: Seosamneung Cluster, Goyang, South Korea
- Consort of: Cheoljong of Joseon
- Issue: 1 son
- Clan: Mjryang Park (by birth); Jeonju Yi (by marriage)
- Dynasty: Yi

Korean name
- Hangul: 귀인 박씨
- Hanja: 貴人 朴氏
- RR: Gwiin Bakssi
- MR: Kwiin Pakssi

Gwiin Park (Korean: 귀인 박씨; Hanja: 貴人 朴氏; 1827 – 27 April 1889), of the Miryang Park clan, was a consort of Cheoljong of Joseon.

== Biography ==
Lady Park was born in 1827, during Sunjo's reign, into the Miryang Park clan. She became a palace lady and was appointed as royal consort after giving birth to a prince in 1854. Her son died a few months later.

Lady Park died during Gojong's reign, at the age of 63.

She was initially buried in Pocheon, Gyeonggi Province, but her tomb was later moved to the Seosamneung Cluster, in Goyang, which also contains the tombs of King Cheoljong and Queen Cheorin.

== In popular culture ==
- Portrayed by Park Ji-young in the 1990 MBC TV series Daewongun.
