= Yoon Sung-sik =

South Korean television director and producer

- Born: 1970 (age 54–55); South Korea
- Occupation(s): Television director, producer
- Agent: KBS Drama Production

Korean name
- Hangul: 윤성식
- RR: Yun Seongsik
- MR: Yun Sŏngsik

Yoon Sung-sik (born 1970) is a South Korean television director and producer.

== Filmography ==
=== As director ===
- Drama City "Booyong of Mt. Kyeryong" (KBS2, 2005–2006)
- Dae Jo-yeong (KBS1, 2006–2007)
- Drama City "Thanks To" (KBS2, 2008)
- The Slingshot (KBS2, 2009)
- Drama Special "Summer Story" (KBS2, 2010)
- Drama Special "Just Say It" (KBS2, 2010)
- Bridal Mask (KBS2, 2012)
- You Are the Best! (KBS2, 2013)
- The King's Face (KBS2, 2014–2015)
- Hwarang (KBS2, 2016–2017)
- Babel (TV Chosun, 2019)
- Mr. Queen (tvN, 2020–2021)
- The Haunted Palace (SBS, 2025)

=== As producer ===
- Detectives in Trouble (KBS2, 2011)
- Trot Lovers (KBS2, 2014)
- Love Returns (KBS1, 2017) (Executive)
