= Prince Sanggye =

Korean prince (1769–1786)

Prince Sanggye or Prince Wanpung (21 January 1769 – 20 November 1786) was a Korean prince, an adopted son of Jeongjo of Joseon and biological child of Prince Euneon.

== Biography ==
Prince Sanggye was born as Yi Jun, on 21 January 1769, in Hanseong. He was the son of Prince Euneon and his wife, Princess Consort Sangsan of the Jincheon Song clan, a daughter of Song Rak-hyu. His father was the son of Crown Prince Sado and his great-grandfather was King Yeongjo. During his early childhood, he was adopted by Hong Guk-yeong, the fourth cousin-once-removed of Lady Hyegyŏng, as the son of his sister, Wonbin Hong, and King Jeongjo.

At the time, Ku Seon-bok and other Joseon noblemen supported Yi Jun as heir to the throne, but as King Jeongjo was in his mid-20s and could still be expected to produce a child, Kim Jong-su, along with many of Jeongjo's ministers, who were enemies of Hong Guk-yeong, demanded his and Prince Wanpung's removal.

On 7 May 1779, Wonbin Hong suddenly died and the king's ministers repeatedly accused Hong Guk-yeong and the prince.

On 26 September 1779, Hong Guk-yeong was expelled from power and jailed. Prince Wanpung's title was demoted to Sanggye and his name was also changed from Yi Jun to Yi Dam, but the king's retainers continued their attacks.

On 21 January 1784, he was married to a lady from the Pyongsan Shin clan, daughter of Shin Oh.

On 20 November 1786, Prince Sanggye suddenly died, suspected to have been poisoned. Some accused Hong Guk-yeong or his biological father, Prince Euneon, and others accused some of King Jeongjo's retainers. After his death, he was buried at Yeonhul Castle, near modern Sinchon Station and Yonsei University. His funeral was personally arranged by King Jeongjo.

Prince Sanggye was not reinstated for many years. In 1801, his mother, Princess Consort Sangsan, and his wife, Princess Consort Shin, were executed for their conversion to Catholicism (Neo-Confucianism was the state religion of Joseon).

He was eventually amnestied and rehabilitated on 17 June 1849, by King Cheoljong, who was his half-nephew.

== Family ==
- Father:
  - Biological: Prince Euneon (은언군; 29 May 1754 – 30 June 1801)
    - Grandfather: Jangjo of Joseon (조선 장조; 13 February 1735 – 12 July 1762)
    - Grandmother: Concubine Suk of the Buan Im clan (숙빈 임씨; ?–1773)
  - Adoptive: Jeongjo of Joseon (조선 정조왕; 28 October 1752 – 18 August 1800)
    - Grandfather: Jangjo of Joseon (조선 장조; 13 February 1735 – 12 July 1762)
    - Grandmother: Queen Heongyeong of the Pungsan Hong clan (헌경왕후 홍씨; 6 August 1735 – 13 January 1816)
- Mother:
  - Biological: Princess Consort Sangsan of the Jincheon Song clan (상산군부인 송씨; 15 October 1753 – 17 March 1801)
    - Grandfather: Song Nak-hyu (송낙휴)
    - Grandmother: Lady Gu of the Neungseong Gu clan (부인 능성 구씨)
  - Adoptive: Concubine Won of the Pungsan Hong clan (원빈 홍씨; 27 May 1766 – 7 May 1779)
    - Grandfather: Hong Nak-chun (홍낙춘)
    - Grandmother: Lady Yi of the Ubong Yi clan (부인 우봉 이씨)

Sibling(s):

1. Younger brother: Yi Chang-sun (이창순)
2. Younger brother: Yi Chang-deok (이창덕)
3. Younger brother: Yi Dang, Prince Punggye (이당 풍계군; 1783–1826)
4. Younger sister: Lady Yi of the Jeonju Yi clan (이씨; ?–1872)
  1. Brother-in-law: Han Gak-sin (한각신)
- Consorts and their Respective Issue(s):
1. Princess Consort Shin of the Pyongsan Shin clan (평산군부인 평산 신씨; 13 June 1769 – 17 March 1801)
  1. Adopted son: Yi Hui, Prince Ikpyeong (이희 익평군; 1824–1863), son of his younger full-brother Yi Dang, Prince Punggye
2. Unknown concubine – a palace maid (궁인)
  1. Stillborn son

== Ancestry ==
Ancestors of Prince Sanggye

16. King Sukjong
8. King Yeongjo
17. Concubine Suk of the Haeju Choe clan
4. King Jangjo
18. Yi Yu-beon
9. Concubine Yeong of the Jeonui Yi clan
19. Lady Kim
2. Prince Euneon
10. Im Ji-beon
5. Concubine Suk of the Buan Im clan
11. Lady Kim of the Gimhae Kim clan
1. Yi Dam, Crown Prince Sanggye
24. Song Su-ryang
12. Master Song
6. Song Nak-hyu
3. Princess Consort Sangsan of the Jincheon Song clan
7. Lady Gu of the Neungseong Gu clan

== See also ==
- History of Korea
- Political factions of Joseon

== Site link ==
- Crown Prince Sangkye (in Korean)
- 顯祿大夫益平君諡狀
