= Mr. Queen =

2020–2021 South Korean television series

- Promotional poster
- Hangul: 철인왕후
- Hanja: 哲仁王后
- Lit.: Queen Cheorin
- RR: Cheorin wanghu
- MR: Ch'ŏrin wanghu
- Genre: Historical; Romantic comedy; Fantasy; Body swap
- Created by: Studio Dragon tvN; Jang cheol-kyo Kim Young-gyu
- Based on: Go Princess Go by Xian Chen Go Princess Go by Qin Shuang and Shang Menglu
- Written by: Park Gye-ok; Choi Ah-il
- Directed by: Yoon Sung-sik
- Starring: Shin Hye-sun; Kim Jung-hyun; Bae Jong-ok; Kim Tae-woo; Seol In-ah; Na In-woo
- Opening theme: "Mr Queen" by Howl
- Ending theme: "Like A Star" by Jang Han-byul
- Country of origin: South Korea
- Original language: Korean
- No. of episodes: 20

Production
- Executive producer: Lee Chan-ho
- Producers: Ham Jeong-yeop; Kim Dong-hyun; Han Kwang-ho; Jeon Gyu-ah
- Running time: 70–90 minutes
- Production companies: Crave Works; YG Studioplex

Original release
- Network: tvN
- Release: December 12, 2020 – February 14, 2021

Mr. Queen (Korean: 철인왕후) is a 2020 South Korean television series based on the Chinese web series Go Princess Go. Directed by Yoon Sung-sik, it stars Shin Hye-sun as Queen Cheorin and Kim Jung-hyun as King Cheoljong. The drama is about Queen Cheorin finding herself with the soul of a modern-day man inside her body and King Cheoljong striving to be a king who helps his people. It aired on tvN every Saturday and Sunday at 21:00 (KST) from December 12, 2020, to February 14, 2021.

Despite its controversies, the series is the eleventh highest rated drama in Korean cable television history, with the last episode reaching a nationwide rating of 17.371% and garnering more than 4 million in viewership. It also set a record for tvN by achieving the 5th highest rating in the network's history.

== Synopsis ==
In the modern age, Jang Bong-hwan (Choi Jin-hyuk) is a head chef who works at the Blue House. He is a womanizer with a free spirit. One day, he gets in trouble when a Chinese delegate takes out a fish hook after biting into food cooked by him. After a near-death experience and falling into a pool, he finds himself in the body of So-yong as Queen Cheorin (Shin Hye-sun) in the Joseon period.

King Cheoljong (Kim Jung-hyun), the reigning monarch, is a gentle and easy-going person. However, he is a king as a figurehead, while the true power is wielded by the late King Sunjo's widow, Queen Sunwon (Bae Jong-ok). Bong-hwan goes on a mission to win Queen Sunwon's favor by cooking for her, and to try to return to his body in modern Korea. However, Bong-hwan soon discovers that So-yong has a secret, while the King is not what he seems and has a dark and suspicious side to him.

== Cast ==
=== Main ===
- Shin Hye-sun as Kim So-yong, Queen Cheorin
  - Seo Eun-sol as young Kim So-yong

The Queen of Joseon who has the soul of a man in her body.

- Kim Jung-hyun as Yi Won-beom, King Cheoljong
  - Kim Kang-hoon as young Yi Won-beom

The 25th King of Joseon.

=== Supporting ===
==== People around Queen Cheorin ====
- Cha Chung-hwa as Court Lady Choi

A sanggung and Queen Cheorin's devoted lady-in-waiting.

- Chae Seo-eun as Hong-yeon

Queen Cheorin's loyal maid who served her since they were children.

==== People around King Cheoljong ====
- Yoo Min-kyu as Prince Yeongpyeong

Cheoljong's older half-brother who serves as his royal guard.

- Lee Jae-won as Hong Du-il / Hong Byeol-gam

Cheoljong's friend from his days on Ganghwa Island.

==== Andong Kim clan ====
- Bae Jong-ok as Grand Royal Queen Dowager Kim (Queen Sunwon)

The late King Sunjo's wife, who wields the true power in the country and, thus, relegates Cheoljong to being just a figurehead.

- Kim Tae-woo as Kim Jwa-geun

Queen Sunwon's younger brother and an extremely ambitious man.

- Na In-woo as Kim Byeong-in

The adopted son of Kim Jwa-geun, thus making him Queen Sunwon's nephew and a cousin to Queen Cheorin.

- Jeon Bae-soo as Kim Mun-geun

Queen Cheorin's father.

- Yoo Young-jae as Kim Hwan

A bright young man who spent his days wandering around the palace, Hong Byeol-gam's friend and Kim Byeong-in's cousin.

- Song Min-hyung as Chief State Councillor Kim Byung-hak
- Kang Ji-hoo as Left State Councillor Kim Seok-geun
- Son Kwang-eop as Minister of Military Affairs Kim Chang-hyuk

==== Pungyang Jo clan ====
- Seol In-ah as Jo Hwa-jin, Royal Noble Consort Ui (Jo Gwi-in)

Cheoljong's concubine and first love.

- Jo Yeon-hee as Royal Queen Dowager Jo (Queen Sinjeong)

The late Crown Prince Hyomyeong's only wife.

- Ko In-beom Right State Councillor Jo Man-hong
- Kim Kwang-sik as Minister of Personnel Jo Deok-mun
- Sung Min-soo as Royal Secretary Jo Dae-su

Jo Hwa-jin's father.

==== People in the Blue House ====
- Choi Jin-hyuk as Jang Bong-hwan

An arrogant playboy and Blue House chef who is caught in a conspiracy and, after a near-death experience, he wakes up in Queen Cheorin's body.

- Lee Cheol-min as Director Han Pyo-jin / Han Shim-ong
- Kim Joon-won as Bu Seung-min

==== People in the Royal Kitchen ====
- Kim In-kwon as Royal Chef Man-bok

A cuisine specialist who doesn't get along with Queen Cheorin.

- Kang Chae-won as Dam-hyang

A young court lady who is close to Queen Cheorin.

==== Court Ladies ====
- Kim Ju-young as Oh-wol

Jo Hwa-jin's maid.

- Son So-mang as Court Lady Kang

Queen Sinjeong's lady-in-waiting.

- Seo Hye-ryeong as a court lady
- Ahn Ju-ri as a court lady

==== People in the Royal Palace ====
- Kang Da-hyun as Hang Sim-hyang
- Yoon Gi-won as royal physician
- Yoon Jin-ho as Head Eunuch
- Lee Tae-gum as Eunuch Kim
- Choi Hwan-yi as Eunuch Choi
- Kim Bang-won as Sal-su

=== Special appearances ===
- Ha Min as Physician Park (Ep. 1)
- Seo Dong-suk as detective (Ep. 1)
- Kwon Eun-soo as court lady (Ep. 2)
- Kim Ka-eun as a young court lady (Ep. 2)
- Lee Seung-jin as royal guard (Ep. 2)
- Yoon Jung-ro as royal guard (Ep. 2)
- Baek Jae-jin as general store owner (Ep. 2–3)
- Oh Ji-young as court lady (Ep. 3)
- Na Mi-hee as court lady (Ep. 3)
- Kim Yong-jin as eunuch (Ep. 3)
- Moon Hak-jin as food palanquin bearer (Ep. 6)
- Koo Ja-keon as food palanquin bearer (Ep. 6)
- Kim Seung-wan as food palanquin bearer (Ep. 6)
- Kim Nan-hee as fortune teller (Ep. 6)

== Production ==
In March 2020, Shin Hye-sun was confirmed to be a part of the drama. In June 2020, Kim Jung-hyun, Bae Jong-ok, Kim Tae-woo joined her to play lead roles in the series. In July 2020, Seol In-ah and Yoo Young-jae also joined the cast.

In October, the first script reading was held. The stills from filming of the series were released on November 16, 2020.

The series reunites actors Kim Jung-hyun and Seol In-ah who previously acted together in the drama School 2017.

It also marks the second collaboration of Shin Hye-sun with actors Bae Jong-ok, Kim In-kwon and Lee Jae-won with whom she acted in the film Innocence and the dramas Angel's Last Mission: Love and Legend of the Blue Sea, respectively.

On November 24, 2020, filming was stopped as one of the supporting actors tested positive for COVID-19.

== Release ==
From November 4, 2021, the series is available for streaming on Amazon Prime Video. From February 15, 2023, the series was made available for streaming on Netflix.

== Episodes ==
No.	Title	Directed by	Written by	Original release date	South Korea viewers (millions)
1	"Jang Bong-hwan In Wonderland"	Yoon Sung-sik	Park Gye-ok & Choi Ah-il	December 12, 2020	1.901
Jang Bong-hwan is the youngest chef in the Blue House, who believes that 'cooking is politics'. A fish hook is found in the food he prepared for the Chinese envoy, so he loses his job, and an investigation into corruption in food purchases is also started. While escaping the police, he falls from a high-rise building into a swimming pool and drowns. When he wakes up, he finds out that he has time-traveled back to 1851 in the Joseon era and his soul has been swapped into the unconscious body of Kim So-yong, Joseon's soon-to-be Queen, who suffered a mysterious accident the night before her wedding. Jang Bong-hwan tries to exit out of Kim So-yong's body in different ways, such as submerging his head in water, but fails. He also tries to jump into the lake where the Queen's body was found, but soon learns that all the lakes in the palace have been drained and dried out under the order of the Grand Queen Dowager Sunwon to prevent similar accidents from happening again. Bong-hwan in Kim So-yong's body is wedded to Yi Byeon, King Cheoljong, in a traditional royal wedding ceremony. Jo Hwa-jin, who was accused by several courtiers as the one who pushed Kim So-yong into the lake, enters the palace as a concubine. The episode ends with Jang Bong-hwan in the body of Queen Cheorin, trying to somehow avoid the wedding night.
2	"Nobody Knows"	Yoon Sung-sik	Park Gye-ok & Choi Ah-il	December 13, 2020	2.337
Both the King and Queen try to get the other one drunk but finally end up sleeping in separate beds. The King leaves the bedroom in silence and goes to raid the Andong Kim clan's secret warehouse. He wants to find evidence that can prove their corruption and strip them of their power, but he is unable to find anything. The next day, Jang Bong-hwan/Kim So-yong goes to greet the Grand Queen Dowager and the Queen Dowager. She also attended the court as Queen Consort, where she became aware of the rivalry and the power struggle between the Andong Kim and Pungyang Jo clans. She bestows the title of "Eun-bin" on Jo Hwa-jin in an investiture ceremony. Due to her improper conduct, she undergoes etiquette class under the order of the Grand Queen Dowager. The royal couple agrees to pretend to sleep together but spend the night separately as each pleases. At night, the Queen goes to the Gisaeng House disguised as a man. Unknown to her, the King is also there for secret counseling with his allies about finding evidence of corruption in the Kim family and her disguise is exposed as she accidentally walks into their counseling session totally drunk. Cheoljong misunderstands the Queen's presence at the meeting as an attempt to spy on his plans. The episode ends with the King chasing after her with a drawn sword.
3	"Sleeping With The Enemy"	Yoon Sung-sik	Park Gye-ok & Choi Ah-il	December 19, 2020	2.276
The King has his face hidden with a piece of fabric and suspects that the Queen overheard his plans. The drunk Queen mistakes him for a thief trying to rob her, so she drops her money and is saved by her adopted cousin, Kim Byeong-in. Before the King makes his escape, he clashes swords with Kim Byeong-in, who attempts to use a lantern to get a closer look at the face. Kim Byeong-in is the Queen's long-time companion and has feelings for her. He escorts her back into the palace with a palanquin. Waking up with a hangover, she has no recollection of the events from the prior day and has a craving for ramyeon as a hangover cure. The Queen does not like the food prepared by the royal kitchen, so she takes over it to make ramyeon from scratch to recover from the hangover. As she shows off her chef skills in the kitchen, the Queen realizes that she can prepare food for the Grand Queen Dowager to win her over. Pleased with her culinary arts, the Grand Queen Dowager grants the Queen's wish to fill the lake with water. When the King visits the Queen, she deduces by the fragrance of the jasmine tea he offers her that it was the King himself who chased her the night before with a sword.
4	"The Man Who Knows Too Much"	Yoon Sung-sik	Park Gye-ok & Choi Ah-il	December 20, 2020	2.801
She connects the dots and figures out that the King was the one who threatened her life. The Queen asks him to drink the tea offered to her as a gesture of affection. He drinks but leaning forward, he kisses her to put the liquid in her mouth. She spills the tea and yells at him. The Queen, again, delivers a creamy dish to the Grand Queen Dowager, however, the dish spills during delivery, so she plans to build a food palanquin. Based on a letter she had written, the concubine Hwa-jin is accused of trying to kill the Queen by pushing her into the lake. The King tries to save Hwa-jin by stepping up to confess but is stopped by Bong-hwan/So Yong, and he/she admits that she tried to take her own life that night by jumping in the lake. She asks the Grand Queen Dowager to let the innocent parties go.
5	"A Heels That Can Easily Get Hurt"	Yoon Sung-sik	Park Gye-ok & Choi Ah-il	December 26, 2020	2.939
Concubine Hwa-jin is saved by Bong-hwan/So Yong's confession that she tried to kill herself on the night before the royal wedding. The Grand Dowager Queen says that the Queen had come to her on that fateful night, expressing her desire to leave the palace. As heavy rain pours down on the palace, the Queen dances for joy in the rain because the lake will be filled with water. At dawn, she jumps in the lake, with the hope that it will allow Bong-hwan to time-travel back to present-day South Korea.
6	"Between Understanding And Misunderstanding"	Yoon Sung-sik	Park Gye-ok & Choi Ah-il	December 27, 2020	2.981
The King and his friend have a talk in which he describes the Queen as "alien" based on her erratic behaviour. He foils Bong-hwan's attempt to return to the present era by pulling the Queen out of the lake. There is a misunderstanding about the words "no touching" as both see it in different contexts. The Pungyang Jo family files a petition to depose the Queen for being of an unsound mind. The King speaks in her favor, and Hwa-jin writes a letter to her father to withdraw the petition at the request of the King. The Queen got the idea of starting a convenience store, the first of its kind in that period. In the present era, Bong-hwan's body is shown to be in a vegetative state. A mysterious person tries to disable his life support, and Bong-hwan almost stops breathing. Back in the Joseon era, the Queen stops breathing as well and collapses.
7	"Mask"	Yoon Sung-sik	Park Gye-ok & Choi Ah-il	January 2, 2021	3.281
When the King finds out that the Queen has stopped breathing and passed out, he immediately runs to her, and as soon as he sees her, he starts to care for the Queen, who seems to have passed out after Bong-Hwan's soul left the body. This causes a big disturbance in the palace. On the other hand, Bong-hwan returns to the modern world and to his original body and, filled with joy, hears a wonderful story, but when he learns a piece of shocking news, he returns to a vegetative state, falling again into despair. The King seems to care a lot about the Queen and proclaims that she is his woman and he is the ruler of this country. The doctor tries to heal the Queen who seems to have also fallen into a vegetative state. The Queen then has a new life force, but is it the real So-yong's soul returning to her original body, Bong-hwan's soul, or a new soul? However, after seeing the King's face, she faints again, causing serious concern to Grand Queen Dowager Suwon, who orders Kim Byeong-In to interrupt Queen Dowager Shinjeong and her fortune teller's black magic ceremony. Later on, they change their target to the King after Queen Shinjeong and the fortune teller confess in front of her. Prince Yeongpyeong comes to help protect the King. The palace is truly disturbed until the Queen recovers. Hwa-jin reflects, "it seems like everyone in the palace has their own secrets and to hide them, they wear masks!"
8	"A Dangerous Relationship"	Yoon Sung-sik	Park Gye-ok & Choi Ah-il	January 3, 2021	3.240
King Cheoljong and his bodyguard, Prince Yeongpyeong, practice fighting together. The purpose of the training is to protect themselves from Kim Byeong-in who seems to have discovered that the piece of robe he found is from the palace. (Referring to evidence of the King's secret meeting to figure out the corruption of the Kim family). After the practice, they pretended to hunt by catching a rabbit before entering the palace. On the way, they meet Kim Jwa-geun (Queen Suwon's brother), who mentions two things. The safety of the King when going outside the palace and the status of the Queen. The King decides to visit the Queen, and on the way, he observes the life of his people. Kids are cheering, a man makes a marriage proposal, therefore, he thinks it is a good day. On the other hand, when Bong-hwan wakes up in So-yong's body again, he regains more of So-yong's actual memories. Bong-hwan's soul in the Queen's body can play a traditional Korean musical instrument and remember Hong-yeon as her friend when they both were younger. Bong-hwan gets upset as he loses his true identity from the present day, and his thoughts are now heard in a woman's voice. But what has actually happened if it is not the real Queen's soul back in her original body? As soon as Jo Hwa-jin notices that Cheoljong had decided to visit the Queen without Prince Yeongpyeong, she feels insecure as Cheoljong visits So-yong in her family house in Hanyang. Hwa-jin quickly follows after him to stop him, but she is too slow. By the time she arrives, the King and Queen are already touring the village, having So-yong's father as their tour guide, but when Cheoljong sees a well, he is reminded of his childhood, when he had been in one as well. The King suddenly turns weak and everybody is worried about him. At that moment, Hwa-jin arrives. She is concerned about Cheoljong's health and suspects that it was the Queen's fault. The Queen asks her father to escort the King inside and mentions that Hwa-jin (Royal Noble Consort Eui) has come to speak to her. Hwa-jin replies that she visited because she had been worried about the Queen's health, but it seems that it's the King who is unwell.
9	"Light And Darkness"	Yoon Sung-sik	Park Gye-ok & Choi Ah-il	January 9, 2021	3.195
So-yong wants to go back to the palace as soon as possible. However, the King wants to stay at her place one more night in order to find the hidden ledger so he makes an excuse to go undercover. The Queen joins Cheoljong's undercover adventure which leads to an unexpected street market date. So-yong's heart is trembling because of her husband's unexpected side. Meanwhile, after getting humiliated, Hwa-jin prepares her revenge against the Grand Queen Dowager.
10	"Living A Nightmare"	Yoon Sung-sik	Park Gye-ok & Choi Ah-il	January 10, 2021	3.359
Cheoljong does not find the book in So-yong's house and wonders where it is. So-yong comes back to the palace and tries hard to be the perfect Queen, which confuses Cheoljong. To satisfy the King's grandmother and bring back his own identity, So-yong tries to pick more concubines. Meanwhile, a dead body is found in the palace and it creates a big issue.
11	"The Unforgiven (The One Who cannot be Forgiven)"	Yoon Sung-sik	Park Gye-ok & Choi Ah-il	January 16, 2021	3.234
Cheoljong appears in So-yong's dream and So-yong is confused about her feelings. She assumes it is a side effect from traveling back and forth in time and decides to focus on the investiture of the Royal Consorts to retrieve her true identity. Hwa-jin gives the secret ledger to Daebi Jo (Queen Dowager). Meanwhile, Cheoljong prepares for the royal banquet, but someone tries to ruin it behind his back.
12	"Dancing On Top Of The Sword"	Yoon Sung-sik	Park Gye-ok & Choi Ah-il	January 17, 2021	3.625
So-yong tracks down the man who looks exactly like Secretary Han and notices his shady move in the royal kitchen. As she knows how much effort Cheoljong has put into the banquet, she helps him by doing what she does best. Meanwhile, Kim Jwa-geun suddenly delivers a piece of news in front of everyone to threaten Cheoljong.
13	"There Is No Tomorrow"	Yoon Sung-sik	Park Gye-ok & Choi Ah-il	January 23, 2021	3.518
Cheoljong, who was seriously injured in the explosion that took place on the last day, cannot wake up, and the palace turns over. Kim Jwa-geun asks if he would accept the suggestions he had made in the past, and So-yong jumps into the lake to remember her past. On the other hand, Byeong-in, who was chasing behind the attempt to assassinate Cheoljong, enforced a punishment against Geum Wi-young's soldiers even though there was no conclusive evidence. Can Cheoljong wake up from his coma?
14	"The Woman Who Must Die To Live"	Yoon Sung-sik	Park Gye-ok & Choi Ah-il	January 24, 2021	3.595
So-yong, who is drunk, mistakes Cheoljong for Hong-yeon, spending a night together. She wakes up in the morning in astonished. Cheoljong keeps hovering around the Queen, but she tries to avoid him, because she is confused with her heart moving towards the King. An assassination attempt is made on the queen. Dam-hyang gets in trouble.
15	"The Crazy X in This Palace"	Yoon Sung-sik	Park Gye-ok & Choi Ah-il	January 30, 2021	3.898
So-yong is impressed with Cheoljong, who listens and accepts her request after hearing the truth about the ledger from her father, Kim Mun-geun. The Queen decides to get her revenge on those people who tried to kill her by suggesting to Cheoljong to ally. Meanwhile, the King feels a little strange about his memory of what happened in the well and Kim Byeong-in starts serving the Jo clan.
16	"All In"	Yoon Sung-sik	Park Gye-ok & Choi Ah-il	January 31, 2021	4.094
After Cheoljong shares his dreams about the future of Joseon with So-yong, she decides to help Cheoljong by applying knowledge from the present day. Byeong-in is hurt and lonely as the King and Queen become closer every day. Meanwhile, Hwa-jin decides to tell Cheoljong the truth about the well incident.
17	"Pregnancy Is Beautiful"	Yoon Sung-sik	Park Gye-ok & Choi Ah-il	February 6, 2021	3.731
The Queen is shocked when she is told that she is pregnant. King Cheoljong is overjoyed with the news. So-yong feels stressed because she did not expect to be pregnant and is unhappy because she has to stop drinking alcohol and is prohibited from consuming unhealthy foods. However, it's soon rumored that the King and Queen never spent the night together and suspicion arises that the baby So-yong is carrying is not the King's child. Hearing of it, So-yong can not remain silent and decides to go to the Cheoljong and reveal their romance in front of the ladies in order to quell the rumors. Hwa-jin decides to make things right and asks a favor of the king.
18	"The Counterattack Of Memories"	Yoon Sung-sik	Park Gye-ok & Choi Ah-il	February 7, 2021	3.968
Cheoljong leaves the palace to protect So-yong and she worries about him when he disappears without any explanation. Meanwhile, the Grand Queen Dowager regains her regency as soon as Cheoljong leaves his spot, and she brings back Kim Jwa-geun to assist her. Byeong-in tries to persuade the Queen to reconcile with the Kim clan, but she rejects his suggestion. So-yong runs away from the palace to look for Cheoljong. Byeong-in tries to kill So-yong at the edge of a cliff because he thinks she is someone else in disguise.
19	"The Man Who Came Back From The Dead"	Yoon Sung-sik	Park Gye-ok & Choi Ah-il	February 13, 2021	3.912
Byeong-in dies while protecting the Queen from assassins. The palace is busy with the preparation for the enthronement ceremony. However, someone goes around the streets and spreads the news that the King survived.
20	"My Life Without Me"	Yoon Sung-sik	Park Gye-ok & Choi Ah-il	February 14, 2021	4.749
Cheoljong and the Queen return to the palace to stop the planned enthronement ceremony. After a near-death experience during the fight, Bong-hwan returns to the future and the original So-yong awakens in her body. Cheoljong manages to take back his position and punish his enemies. So-yong nearly has a miscarriage, but safely pulls through. Afterwards, she takes the inner court power back from the Grand Queen Dowager and begins the new ruling era with King Cheoljong.

=== Spin-off ===
tvN announced that they would be airing a spin-off titled Mr. Queen: The Secret (official Korean name: Mr. Queen: Bamboo Forest), which featured the secrets and an extended love story of King Cheoljong and Queen Cheorin. It aired exclusively on the streaming service, TVING after the end of the main series' episodes 19 and 20 on February 13–14.

No.	Title	Directed by	Written by	Original release date
1	"The Secrets of The First Meeting"	Yoon Sung-sik	Park Gye-ok & Choi Ah-il	February 13, 2021
In a time before So-yong became elected as the future queen of Joseon, she tries to catch a glimpse of the Emperor in hopes of knowing what her potential future husband looks like. After many failed attempts, So-yong meets a handsome young man. The next day, she realizes the young man is the Emperor when he bestows her the title as queen of Joseon.
2	"The Secrets of The Competition"	Yoon Sung-sik	Park Gye-ok & Choi Ah-il	February 13, 2021
Kim Beyong-yin and Prince Yeongpyeong compete to find out which of them is the stronger one.
3	"A Lady's Secret"	Yoon Sung-sik	Park Gye-ok & Choi Ah-il	February 13, 2021
A storybook is spread throughout the palace. All the maids love it so much that they pass it around.
4	"The Secrets of The Guy Friend"	Yoon Sung-sik	Park Gye-ok & Choi Ah-il	February 14, 2021
King Cheoljeung gets jealous when he catches various men coming out of So-yong's bedchamber and begins to wonder who she is most fond of.
5	"The Secrets of The Real Siblings"	Yoon Sung-sik	Park Gye-ok & Choi Ah-il	February 14, 2021
Sibling rivalry between the Grand Dowager and Kim Jwa-geun.
6	"The Secrets of Destruction"	Yoon Sung-sik	Park Gye-ok & Choi Ah-il	February 14, 2021
Everyone in the palace panics as news of the end of the world nears. So-yong, King Cheoljeong and their close ones watch and witness the night sky being brightened by a meteor shower. So-yong convinces everyone to make wishes. Many wish to meet each other again in their next lives.

== Original soundtrack ==
Mr. Queen OST

Soundtrack album by Various artists
- Released: 2020; 2021
- Genre: Soundtrack
- Languages: Korean; English
- Labels: The Groove Company by Big Ocean ENM; Dreamus Company

Part 1

Released on December 13, 2020
No.	Title	Lyrics	Music	Artist	Length
1.	"Bong Hwan A" (봉환아)	Jang Young-soo; OSKAR (HIGHBRID); SIROO (HIGHBRID); ARTROTMAN (HIGHBRID)	Jang Young-soo; OSKAR (HIGHBRID); SIROO (HIGHBRID); ARTROTMAN (HIGHBRID)	Norazo	2:37
2.	"Bong Hwan A" (inst.)		Jang Young-soo; OSKAR (HIGHBRID); SIROO (HIGHBRID); ARTROTMAN (HIGHBRID)		2:37
Total length:					5:14

Part 2

Released on December 27, 2020
No.	Title	Lyrics	Music	Artist	Length
1.	"Like A Star" (마음이 별이 되어)	DANI; HowL	Park Geun-chul; Jung Soo-min	Jang Han-byul	4:08
2.	"Like A Star" (inst.)		Park Geun-chul; Jung Soo-min		4:08
Total length:					8:16

Part 3

Released on January 3, 2021
No.	Title	Lyrics	Music	Artist	Length
1.	"Here I Am"	B.O.K	B.O.K; Yoon Sang-jo	Jo Hyun-ah (Urban Zakapa)	3:58
2.	"Here I Am" (inst.)		B.O.K; Yoon Sang-jo		3:58
Total length:					7:56

Part 4

Released on January 9, 2021
No.	Title	Lyrics	Music	Artist	Length
1.	"Puzzle"	Hwang Yong-joo; Park Woo-jin (AB6IX)	Hwang Yong-joo; Jo Dae-min	Soyou; Park Woo-jin (AB6IX)	3:00
2.	"Puzzle" (inst.)		Hwang Yong-joo; Jo Dae-min		3:00
Total length:					6:00

Part 5

Released on January 16, 2021
No.	Title	Lyrics	Music	Artist	Length
1.	"Keep Going"	Major Leaguer; Yonggi; DinDin	Major Leaguer	DinDin	3:55
2.	"Keep Going" (inst.)		Major Leaguer		3:55
Total length:					7:50

Part 6

Released on January 17, 2021
No.	Title	Lyrics	Music	Artist	Length
1.	"The Great Recipe" (철인시대 (위대한 레시피))	DANI; HowL	Park Geun-chul; Jung Soo-min	sEODo	3:49
2.	"The Great Recipe" (inst.)		Park Geun-chul; Jung Soo-min		3:49
Total length:					7:38

Part 7

Released on January 31, 2021
No.	Title	Lyrics	Music	Artist	Length
1.	"To My One and Only You" (나의 유일한 너에게)	Choi Soo-in; Kim A-hyun	Choi Soo-in	Xiumin (EXO)	4:31
2.	"To My One and Only You" (inst.)		Choi Soo-in		4:31
Total length:					9:02

Part 8

Released on February 7, 2021
No.	Title	Lyrics	Music	Artist	Length
1.	"Like A Star" (별들 중에서)	HowL; Junoha	HowL; Junoha	Onestar	4:25
2.	"Like A Star" (inst.)		HowL; Junoha		4:25
Total length:					8:50

Part 9

Released on February 13, 2021
No.	Title	Lyrics	Music	Artist	Length
1.	"Venus (feat. Kwon Hyun-bin)"	Psycho Tension (GK, KiKO)	Psycho Tension (GK, KiKO)	Moon Jong-up	3:16
2.	"Venus" (inst.)		Psycho Tension (GK, KiKO)		3:16
Total length:					6:32

Mr. Queen: The Bamboo Forest OST

Released on February 27, 2021
No.	Title	Lyrics	Music	Artist	Length
1.	"But I Miss You"	DANI; HowL	Park Geun-chul; Jung Soo-min	Gyeongree	3:40
2.	"But I Miss You" (inst.)		Park Geun-chul; Jung Soo-min		3:40
Total length:					7:20

Mr. Queen OST (Various Artists)

Released on February 17, 2021
No.	Title	Lyrics	Music	Artist	Length
1.	"Bong Hwan A" (봉환아)	Jang Young-soo; OSKAR (HIGHBRID); SIROO (HIGHBRID); ARTROTMAN (HIGHBRID)	Jang Young-soo; OSKAR (HIGHBRID); SIROO (HIGHBRID); ARTROTMAN (HIGHBRID)	Norazo	2:37
2.	"Like A Star" ((마음이 별이 되어))			Jang Han-byul
3.	"Here I am"			Jo Hyun-ah (Urban Zakapa)
4.	"Puzzle"			Soyou; Park Woo-jin (AB6IX)
5.	"Keep Going"			DinDin
6.	"The Great Recipe" ((철인시대 (위대한 레시피)))			sEODo
7.	"To My One and Only You" (나의 유일한 너에게)			Xiumin (EXO)
8.	"Like A Star" (별들 중에서)			Onestar
9.	"Venus (feat. Kwon Hyun-bin)"			Moon Jong-up
10.	"Like The First Snow" (첫눈처럼)	Kim Jung-hyun; E-Race; Ha Jae-hong	Baek Moo-hyun; E-Race	Kim Jung-hyun
11.	"Mr.Queen"		Howl
12.	"Secret of the well"		Howl
13.	"Conspiracy"		DL
14.	"Palace"		Howl
15.	"No Touch"		Howl
16.	"Iron tango"		Howl
17.	"Lost Memory"		Howl
18.	"Other World"		Howl
19.	"Rebellion"		DL
20.	"Toy Soldier"		DL

Chart performance

Title	Year	Peak positions		Remarks	Ref.
Title	Year	KOR Gaon	KOR Hot	Remarks	Ref.
"Here I Am" (Jo Hyun-ah)	2021	115	—N/a	Part 3	
"Puzzle" (Soyou & Park Woo-jin)	2021	— (Note: "Puzzle" didn't enter Gaon Digital Chart, but peaked 16 position on the Gaon Download Chart)	—N/a	Part 4	

== Reception ==
=== Controversies ===
Following its airing, a controversy erupted in episode 2 as the series referred to Korea's national treasure, the Veritable Records of the Joseon Dynasty as a "tabloid." This drew outrage among viewers and about 700 people filed complaints to the Korea Communications Standards Commission. The series was also criticised as the author of the original Chinese drama has made negative remarks about Korea in their other work. The producers released a statement clarifying their stance and apologising for the controversies, adding that they were not aware of the negative comments made by the novelist.

=== Domestic audience viewership ===
An 8.0% viewership rating was recorded nationwide for the first episode, making it the second-highest premiere rating of any weekend drama of the network and fifth-highest premiere rating of the network after Hospital Playlist 2, Jirisan, Mr. Sunshine, and Encounter.

As per Nielsen Korea, the final episode logged a national average viewership of 17.37%, breaking its own highest ratings, thereby making the series 5th highest-rated drama in Korean cable television history.

Mr. Queen : South Korea viewers per episode (millions)

Season	Episode number																				Average
Season	1	2	3	4	5	6	7	8	9	10	11	12	13	14	15	16	17	18	19	20	Average
1	1.901	2.337	2.276	2.801	2.939	2.981	3.281	3.240	3.195	3.359	3.234	3.625	3.518	3.595	3.898	4.094	3.731	3.968	3.912	4.749	3.332

Source: Audience measurement performed nationwide by Nielsen Korea

Average TV viewership ratings
Ep.	Original broadcast date	Average audience share (Nielsen Korea)	
Ep.	Original broadcast date	Nationwide	Seoul
1	December 12, 2020	8.030% (1st)	8.657% (1st)
2	December 13, 2020	8.800% (1st)	9.527% (1st)
3	December 19, 2020	9.022% (1st)	9.709% (1st)
4	December 20, 2020	10.447% (1st)	11.414% (1st)
5	December 26, 2020	11.337% (1st)	11.953% (1st)
6	December 27, 2020	11.805% (1st)	12.549% (1st)
7	January 2, 2021	12.414% (1st)	13.250% (1st)
8	January 3, 2021	12.271% (1st)	12.953% (1st)
9	January 9, 2021	12.066% (1st)	13.014% (1st)
10	January 10, 2021	12.836% (1st)	14.014% (1st)
11	January 16, 2021	12.517% (1st)	13.354% (1st)
12	January 17, 2021	13.224% (1st)	14.252% (1st)
13	January 23, 2021	12.797% (1st)	13.809% (1st)
14	January 24, 2021	13.623% (1st)	15.061% (1st)
15	January 30, 2021	14.534% (1st)	15.933% (1st)
16	January 31, 2021	14.946% (1st)	15.872% (1st)
17	February 6, 2021	14.510% (1st)	15.682% (1st)
18	February 7, 2021	14.844% (1st)	15.496% (1st)
19	February 13, 2021	14.227% (1st)	15.132% (1st)
20	February 14, 2021	17.371% (1st)	18.554% (1st)
Average		12.581%	13.509%
In the table above, the blue numbers represent the lowest ratings and the red numbers represent the highest ratings.; This drama airs on a cable channel/pay TV which normally has a relatively smaller audience compared to free-to-air TV/public broadcasters (KBS, SBS, MBC and EBS).

=== Global audience viewership ===
Mr. Queen became the 4th most popular TV show on Netflix a few days after it was made available for streaming on February 20, 2023, as per data provided by FlixPatrol for February 20. Mr. Queen went further up the Netflix Top 10 TV Shows Worldwide Chart.

Mr. Queen took 5th place in the Netflix global viewing hours with 20.9 million viewing hours in its first week after it was made available for streaming on Netflix. It reached Top 10 in TV in 33 countries from Africa, Asia, and the Americas including Brazil, Bolivia, Ecuador, Mexico, Peru, Kenya, Morocco, Nigeria, Australia, New Zealand, Bangladesh, Hong Kong, Indonesia, India, Malaysia, Pakistan, Philippines, Saudi Arabia, Singapore, South Korea, Sri Lanka, Taiwan, Thailand, Turkey, and Vietnam.

== Awards and nominations ==
Awards	Category	Recipient	Result	Ref.
57th Baeksang Arts Awards	Best Actress (TV)	Shin Hye-sun	Nominated	
57th Baeksang Arts Awards	Best Supporting Actress (TV)	Cha Chung-hwa	Nominated	
