= Wonbin Hong =

Joseon royal consort (1766–1779)

- Royal Consort of the Senior First Rank
- Born: 22 June 1766; Seogang-bang, Hanseong, Joseon
- Died: 9 June 1779 (aged 12); Changdeokgung, Hanseong, Joseon
- Burial: Wonbinmyo, Seosamneung Cluster, Goyang, South Korea
- Consort of: Jeongjo of Joseon
- Issue: Prince Sanggye (adopted)
Names
- Title: Lady Sukchang (숙창궁; 淑昌宮; Sukchanggung; lit. ''Sukchang Palace'')
Posthumous name
- Insuk (인숙; 仁淑)
- Clan: Pungsan Hong (by birth); Jeonju Yi (by marriage)
- Dynasty: Yi
- Father: Hong Nak-chun
- Mother: Lady, of the Ubong Yi clan

Korean name
- Hangul: 원빈 홍씨
- Hanja: 元嬪 洪氏
- RR: Wonbin Hongssi
- MR: Wŏnbin Hongssi

Wonbin Hong (Korean: 원빈 홍씨; Hanja: 元嬪 洪氏; 22 June 1766 – 9 June 1779), or Concubine Won, (Note: The literal translation of bin (빈; 嬪) is "concubine". Combined with the honorific title won (원; 元), the full meaning is "Primary Concubine".) of the Pungsan Hong clan, also known as Lady Sukchang, was a consort of Jeongjo of Joseon and the younger sister of Hong Guk-yeong.

== Biography ==
=== Early life ===
Lady Hong was born into the Pungsan Hong clan, as the second child and only daughter of Hong Nak-chun and his wife, a lady from the Ubong Yi clan. Through her father, Lady Hong was a distant relative of Lady Hyegyŏng (mother of King Jeongjo), as well as a descendant of Hong Ju-won and Princess Jeongmyeong.

=== Palace life ===
Lady Hong was chosen as a concubine for King Jeongjo when she was 11 years old, in June 1778. She was the first royal consort in Joseon's history to enter the palace with the senior first rank (빈; 嬪; bin); her honorific title was won (원; 元), meaning "primary". It is said that she was treated like a formal consort in the Chinese court, receiving morning greetings, and had posthumous honors conferred to her upon her death. Her elder brother, Hong Guk-yeong, was a chief royal secretary who hoped to enhance his power through her marriage with the king.

However, she died suddenly the year after her appointment.

=== After death ===
King Jeongjo himself composed a eulogy for her. Lady Hong was then given the posthumous name Insuk (인숙; 仁淑; lit. ''Benevolent Purity''). She was initially buried within the current grounds of Korea University, and her tomb was called Inmyeongwon (인명원; 仁明園); however, it was later downgraded to Wonbinmyo (원빈묘; 元嬪墓) and moved to the Seosamneung Cluster in Goyang, Gyeonggi Province. Today, the former site of Inmyeongwon remains within the university grounds and is known as Aegineung (애기능).

== Family ==
- Father: Hong Nak-chun (홍낙춘; 洪樂春)
  - Grandfather: Hong Chang-han (홍창한; 洪昌漢; 1698–?)
  - Grandmother: Lady Yu (유씨; 兪氏); daughter of Yu Du-gi (유두기)
    - Uncle: Hong Nak-sun (홍낙순; 洪樂純; 1723–?)
      - Cousin: Hong Bok-yeong (홍복영; 洪福榮)
    - Uncle: Hong Nak-bin (홍낙빈; 洪樂彬; 1732–?)
- Mother: Lady, of the Ubong Yi clan (우봉 이씨; 牛峰 李氏)
- Sibling(s)
  - Elder brother: Hong Guk-yeong (홍국영; 洪國榮; 1748 – 28 April 1781)
- Husband: Jeongjo of Joseon (조선 정조; 28 October 1752 – 18 August 1800)
- Issue
  - Yi Dam, Prince Sanggye (상계군 이담; 21 January 1769 – 20 November 1786), adopted son

== In popular culture ==
- Portrayed by Lee Ae-jung in the 2001 MBC TV series Hong Guk-yeong.
- Portrayed by Ji Sung-won in the 2007 MBC TV series Lee San, Wind of the Palace.
- Portrayed by Park Seo-kyung in the 2021 MBC TV series The Red Sleeve.
