= Gwiin Jo (Cheoljong) =

Joseon royal consort (1842–1865)

- Royal Consort of the Junior First Rank
- Born: 1 February 1842; Joseon
- Died: 25 December 1866 (aged 24); Hanseong, Joseon
- Burial: Seosamneung Cluster, Goyang, South Korea
- Consort of: Cheoljong of Joseon
- Issue: 2 sons
- Clan: Pungyang Jo (by birth); Jeonju Yi (by marriage)
- Dynasty: Yi

Korean name
- Hangul: 귀인 조씨
- Hanja: 貴人 趙氏
- RR: Gwiin Jossi
- MR: Kwiin Chossi

Gwiin Jo (Korean: 귀인 조씨; Hanja: 貴人 趙氏; 1 February 1842 – 25 December 1866), of the Pungyang Jo clan, was a consort of Cheoljong of Joseon.

== Biography ==
Lady Jo came from the Pungyang Jo clan. At the age of 17, she became a palace lady. On 22 February 1859, she was appointed as a royal consort of the junior first rank (귀인; 貴人; gwiin), and her first son was born in 1859. In 1861, she gave birth to a second son. Both princes died in infancy.

Lady Jo died in 1865, during Gojong's reign, and the funeral rites were held at the residence of Grand Internal Prince Jeongye, King Cheoljong's biological father. Her tomb was initially in Pocheon, Gyeonggi Province, but was later moved to the Seosamneung Cluster in Goyang.

== In popular culture ==
- Portrayed by Seol In-ah in the 2020 tvN TV series Mr. Queen.
