= Hong Guk-yeong =

Korean scholar-official (1748–1781)

- Hangul: 홍국영
- Hanja: 洪國榮
- RR: Hong Gukyeong
- MR: Hong Kugyŏng

Courtesy name
- Hangul: 덕로
- Hanja: 德老
- RR: Deokro
- MR: Tŏngno

Hong Guk-yeong (Korean: 홍국영; Hanja: 洪國榮, 1748 – 28 April 1781), was a noted Korean scholar and politician of Joseon dynasty who first strongly supported King Jeongjo's accession and toiled to improve the king's power, but ended up being expelled because of his desire for power. He served the king in the closest proximity of all government officials and often enjoyed great power that was derived from the king's favor. Hong Guk-yeong and Han Myŏnghoe (during Sejo's reign) are some examples of chief royal secretaries who were the most powerful officials of their time.

== Biography ==
Hong Guk-yeong was born in 1748 in Hanseong into the Pungsan Hong clan. He was the only son of Hong Nak-chun and his wife, Lady Yi of the Ubong Yi clan. Through his father, he was an 11th degree great-nephew of Lady Hyegyŏng (mother of King Jeongjo), as well as the 5th great-grandson of Hong Ju-won and Princess Jeongmyeong.

He served as one of the most trusted advisors and close confidantes to Jeongjo when he was the Crown Prince Yi San. He was also the main tutor of the Crown Prince Yi San. After Yi San ascended the throne as Jeongjo, Hong was promoted to Chief Inspector, Chief of the Royal Guard, and Chief Royal Secretary due to his skill at politics and investigation. His younger sister Lady Hong also became one of Jeongjo's concubines and Hong Guk-yeong hoped to enhance his influence by being related to the King's future heir. However, his sister would die soon after entering the palace. He later died on 28 April 1781 due to health issues.

== In popular culture ==
- Portrayed by Lim Dong-jin in the 1978 TBC TV series Sang-no.
- Portrayed by Kim Sang-kyung in the 2001 MBC TV series Hong Guk-yeong.
- Portrayed by Han Sang-jin in the 2007 MBC TV series Yi San, Wind of the Palace.
- Portrayed by Choi Jae-hwan in the 2011 SBS TV series Warrior Baek Dong-soo.
- Portrayed by Kang Hoon in the 2021 MBC TV series The Red Sleeve.
