= Korean =

Korean may refer to:

== People and culture ==
- Koreans, people from the Korean peninsula
  - Korean diaspora
- Korean language
  - Korean alphabet, known as Hangul
  - Korean dialects
- Korean cuisine

== Places ==
- Korean Peninsula, a peninsula in East Asia
  - North Korea
  - South Korea

== Others ==
- Korean Air, airline of South Korea
- Korean War, conflict between North and South Korea
