= Cheoljong of Joseon =

King of Joseon from 1849 to 1864

Cheoljong
- Emperor of Korea (posthumously)
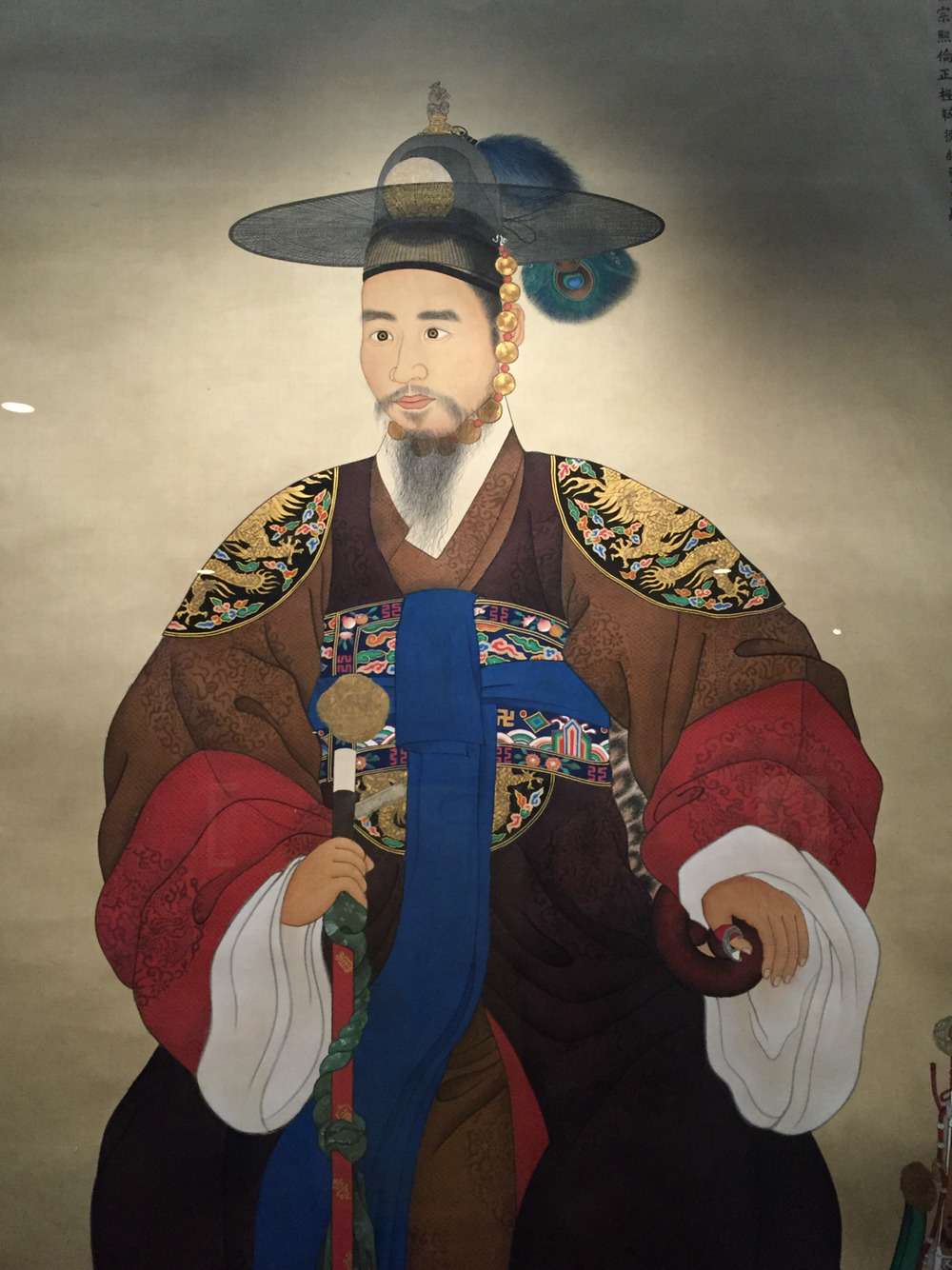
- Restored portrait in military attire, c. 1861 (Note: This is the only surviving portrait depicting Cheoljong's physical appearance, as well as Joseon era royal military attire; it was partly damaged in the 1954 Busan fire and was restored in 1987. It has been designated as Treasure #1492.)

King of Joseon
- Reign: 25 July 1849 – 16 January 1864
- Enthronement: 28 July 1849; Injeongjeon, Changdeokgung
- Predecessor: Heonjong
- Successor: Gojong
- Regent: Grand Queen Dowager Myeonggyeong (1849–1852)
- Born: Yi Won-beom (이원범; 李元範); 25 July 1831; Gyeonghaeng-bang, Hanseong, Joseon
- Died: 16 January 1864 (aged 32); Daejojeon, Changdeokgung, Hanseong, Joseon
- Burial: Yereung, Seosamneung Cluster, Goyang, South Korea
- Spouse: Queen Cheorin (m. 1851)
- Issue Detail: Yi Yung-jun; Princess Yeonghye
Names
- Yi Byeon (이변; 李昪)
Era dates
- Adopted the era name of the Qing dynasty (Note: Dogwang (Daoguang) (도광; 道光): 1849–1850 Hampung (Xianfeng) (함풍; 咸豊): 1851–1861 Dongchi (Tongzhi) (동치; 同治): 1862–1864)
Regnal name
- Huiryun Jeonggeuk Sudeok Sunseong Heummyeong Gwangdo Donwon Changhwa (희륜정극수덕순성흠명광도돈원창화; 熙倫正極粹德純聖欽命光道敦元彰化) (Note: Known as honorific name (존호; 尊號) in the Sinosphere, its closest equivalent in the English-speaking world is the regnal name.)
Posthumous name
- Joseon: Great King Chunggyeong Munhyeon Museong Heonin Yeonghyo (충경문현무성헌인영효대왕; 忠敬文顯武成獻仁英孝大王); Korean Empire: Emperor Munhyeon Museong Heonin Yeonghyo Jang (문현무성헌인영효장황제; 文顯武成獻仁英孝成章帝) (Note: The posthumous name bestowed by China was notably omitted as a sign of the country's "independence".); Qing dynasty: Chunggyeong (충경; 忠敬)
Temple name
- Cheoljong (철종; 哲宗)
- Clan: Jeonju Yi
- Dynasty: Yi
- Father: Grand Internal Prince Jeongye (biological); King Sunjo (adoptive)
- Mother: Grand Internal Princess Consort Yongseong (biological); Queen Sunwon (adoptive)
- Religion: Confucianism (Neo-Confucianism)

Korean name
- Hangul: 철종
- Hanja: 哲宗
- Lit.: "Wise Ancestor"
- RR: Cheoljong
- MR: Ch'ŏlchong

Royal title
- Hangul: 덕완군
- Hanja: 德完君
- RR: Deogwangun
- MR: Tŏgwan'gun

Art name
- Hangul: 대용재
- Hanja: 大勇齋
- RR: Daeyongjae
- MR: Taeyongjae

Courtesy name
- Hangul: 도승
- Hanja: 道升
- RR: Doseung
- MR: Tosŭng

Cheoljong (Korean: 철종; Hanja: 哲宗; 25 July 1831 – 16 January 1864), (Note: In the Korean calendar (lunisolar), he was born on the 17th day of the 6th lunar month and died on the 8th day of the 12th lunar month.) personal name Yi Won-beom, later changed to Yi Byeon, was the 25th monarch of Joseon. A great-great-grandson of King Yeongjo, he was adopted by Queen Sunwon and acceded to the throne upon the death of his nominal nephew, the childless King Heonjong. Following the establishment of the Korean Empire, he was honored as Emperor Jang.

Cheoljong grew up in poverty; even after becoming king, he had little political influence, and the power to govern was held mainly by the Andong Kim clan, the paternal family of Queen Sunwon. The Andong Kim clan's monopoly caused nationwide corruption, resulting in a series of peasant revolts. As Cheoljong's sons all died in infancy, he was also succeeded by a distant relative.

== Biography ==
=== Early life ===
Cheoljong was born Yi Won-beom (이원범), the 3rd and youngest son of Yi Gwang (Jeongye Daewongun), a great-grandson of King Yeongjo of Joseon. His mother was a concubine, and she was a daughter of Yeom Seong-hwa (염성화), a commoner, descended from the Yongdam Yeom clan (용담 염씨).

Prince Euneon was Cheoljong's grandfather and a younger half-brother of Jeongjo of Joseon; in 1786, accused of treason, he and his family was exiled to Ganghwa Island. Prince Euneon was killed during the Catholic Persecution of 1801, as his wife and daughter-in-law became Catholic, which was illegal in Joseon at that time; his children remained in confinement on the island until King Sunjo decided to pardon them in 1822. One of Prince Euneon's sons, Yi Gwang, was in his thirties, thus married a daughter of Choi Su-chang and had a son, Yi Won-gyeong (이원경); he had another two sons, respectively born to different concubines. The family eventually returned to the capital, Hanseong. When Cheoljong was young, he had little education. At the age of four, he studied the Thousand Character Classic; later, he also read some beginning volumes of the Comprehensive Mirror in Aid of Governance and Elementary Learning, but he couldn't remember much content from them, and he stopped studying in following years.

In 1836, Nam Eung-jung (남응중) attempted to enthrone one of the grandsons of Prince Euneon; the plot was exposed and he was executed. During the death of Queen Hyohyeon (consort of King Heonjong) in 1844, a conspiracy by Min Jin-yong (민진용) to enthrone Yi Won-gyeong, Cheoljong's oldest half-brother, was exposed and led to Yi Won-gyeong's execution. Yi Won-gyeong's family, guilty by association, was again exiled to Ganghwa Island.

=== Ascension ===
King Heonjong died in 1849 and he had no issue, thus the lineage of Jeongjo died out. Some officials suggested that a distant royal, Yi Ha-jeon (이하전), could succeed the throne, but he was eight years old, a descendant of Deokheung Daewongun, and merely an 11th cousin once removed to Heonjong. The grandmother of the late king, Queen Sunwon (King Sunjo's widow), preferred to choose the next king herself, from closer relatives. She selected Yi Won-Beom, one of few living descendants of King Yeongjo and a second cousin once removed to Heonjong. She decided to adopt him as the heir and she sent officials to ask his family to return from Ganghwa Island. Yi Won-Beom lived in the countryside as a poor peasant who had no formal education. When he and his family saw the royal messenger coming, they were horrified. The Queen sent the yeonguijeong (Prime Minister) Jeong Won-yong (정원용) to present the order of the Queen Dowager and persuaded them to move to the Capital. According to the legend, as they were about to cross the Han River, there were flocks of sheep kneeling down as if they were waiting for a monarch, which was regarded as a good omen. When they were about to enter the capital, they were warmly welcomed by the citizens with deafening cheer.

When Yi Won-beom arrived in the palace, he was first made "Prince Deokwan" (덕완군), and descendants of Prince Euneon were again regarded as royalty. During their lifetime, Cheoljong's parents had no royal titles, so they were respectively honored as Jeongye Daewongun and Yongseong Budaebuin. Some other relatives of Cheoljong also received titles, including Prince Hoepyeong (his eldest half-brother), Prince Yeongpyeong (his second half-brother), Prince Punggye (his 4th uncle and half-brother of Jeongye Daewongun), as well as Prince Ikpyeong, the son of Prince Punggye; Han Gak-sin (한각신), an uncle of Cheoljong and the son-in-law of Prince Euneon, was appointed to be the officer-in-charge of Ikreung, the royal tomb of Queen Ingyeong in Gyeonggi Province.

On July 28, 1849, Cheoljong ascended the throne in Changdeokgung, and Queen Sunwon served as regent for two years. In following years, Cheoljong resumed his studies. As a monarch, he first changed his name from "Won-Beom" to "Yeop" (엽). However, officials found out the name was too close in pronunciation to that of the Kangxi Emperor of the Qing dynasty in China. To respect the naming taboo tradition, he was renamed again to Byeon (변). Cheoljong married the daughter of Kim Mun-geun (a third cousin of Queen Sunwon) in 1851, and she was later known as Queen Cheorin. Queen Cheorin had their only son in 1858, named Yung-jun, but the infant died less than a year later in 1859.

=== Reign ===
Following the king's wedding of Cheoljong in 1851, Queen Sunwon ended her regency, followed by Cheoljong's assuming regal power. However, politics were still controlled by Queen Sunwon's family, the Andong Kim clan. Throughout the 14-year reign, Cheoljong became a puppet monarch vulnerable to their control; Queen Cheorin was also from the Andong Kim clan, allowing them to tighten the manipulation, with many Kim family members becoming prominent officials in the government. Experiencing the poverty in the past, Cheoljong sympathized the commoners and donated during a serious drought in 1853. In 1856, as the national examination was full of bribery and fraud, Cheoljong criticized the situation and ordered to rectify the chaos, but it was in vain. Meanwhile, the nationwide corruption deteriorated in the field of military and agricultural taxes. A rebellion started in Jinju of the Gyeongsang Province in 1862, and it was repressed, with 13 people executed and 19 exiled. However, the rebellion continued to spread across three southern provinces, as well as Jeju Island. It was discovered the rebellion was a result of the corruption mentioned above, so Cheoljong set an office to carry out a financial reorganization, but the reformation turned out to be ineffective.

Joseon implemented an isolation with interaction to few foreign countries for centuries, and Cheoljong maintained that policy. However, during his reign, vessels from Europe, the United States and Russian Empire, often appeared in Joseon's territorial waters (at least 20 recorded). In 1850, a foreign boat (nationality unknown) appeared in Uljin County of Gangwon Province, and some Joseon officials were killed by its bombardment before it left. In 1851, a French merchant ship with people from the Qing dynasty visited Jeju Island. In 1852, an American whaler stopped by Dongnae District in Gyeongsang Province; at first, the locals couldn't communicate with Americans, and then they found out there were also some Japanese aboard, who were rescued after a shipwreck. In 1854, Russian frigate Pallada entered Tumen River for prospecting, naming Wonsan as "Port Lazarev"; during the process, it was reported that some local residents were shot as the crowd watched the foreign vessel. In 1855, the French sailed a frigate named Virginie along the east Joseon coast from Busan to Tumen River and named some of the islands; another English boat named Sylvia also arrived in Busan in the same year. In 1856, there were hundreds of soldiers from French army not returning to France after the Crimean War; instead, they sacked some coastal cities in Chungcheong Province and Hwanghae Province. In the Second Opium War of 1860, Beijing, the capital of the Qing dynasty was invaded by an Anglo-French force, and the Old Summer Palace was sacked and burnt down. Beijing was close to Joseon, and as the news spread, it caused disturbance in Joseon. Some nobles and officials fled from Hanseong, and people often wore Christian crosses to protect themselves from foreigners. To get further news from China, Cheoljong sent several envoys to visit Xianfeng Emperor, who fled to Chengde Mountain Resort by the time. After the battle, European countries gained several privileges in China; as Joseon was in the tributary system of China, these countries demanded that they should have a same rights in Joseon, only to be rejected. Then Britain, France, the United States and Russian Empire started to pressure Joseon through terrestrial and naval forces.

From the beginning of the 19th century, Catholicism was illegal in Joseon, but during Cheoljong's reign, the persecution was relatively light and the ban was loose. Around 1857, there were about 16.5 thousands of Christians in Joseon. As of 1863, there were twelve Catholic missionaries from France living in Joseon, and within few years, there were over a hundred thousand of Christians around the capital, and some of the court officials became followers. The mother of future Gojong of Korea became a Christian as well. As a reaction to the rapid propagation of Catholicism and the chaotic society, Choe Je-u founded a new religion Donghak to counter foreign influence and gained many followers. Despite the fact that Choe was eventually captured and executed, Donghak continued to spread within Joseon in the remaining century.

As Cheoljong failed to have a male heir for years, other than repressing the revolts, the Andong Kim clan started to persecute royalties. In 1851, Chae Hui-jae (채희재) was executed for attempting to enthrone Yi Myeong-seop (이명섭), a descendant of Crown Prince Sohyeon who was exiled to Chodo (an island now locates near Nampo in North Korea). In 1860, Prince Gyeongpyeong (the heir of Prince Punggye) offended some members of the Andong Kim clan, lost his royal titles and was exiled to Sinjido, almost causing his death many times. In 1862, Kim Sun-seong (김순성) was executed for enthroning Yi Ha-jeon, a distant royalty; Yi Hae-jeon was also implicated, and was exiled to Jeju Island and eventually executed. Yi Ha-jeon was a potential successor to King Heonjong back in 1849, and he showed dissatisfaction toward the imperiousness of the Andong Kim clan, causing them to decide to eliminate him. On the other hand, Prince Heungseon (later Heungseon Daewongun, father of Gojong of Korea) was in poverty like many other royalties, and he was one of the close relatives to Yi Ha-jeon (first cousin-in-law through his wife). Afraid of being persecuted, Prince Heungseon befriended with people from lower classes and often visited kisaengs, acting frivolously and fawning over the authority; this caused the Kim clan to despise him and to be less cautious about him.

Cheoljong's mother was from the Yongdam Yeom clan, a cadet branch of Paju Yeom clan. A man named Yeom Jong-su (염종수) was from the Paju branch, and he forged his genealogy as well as tampered with the tombstone of Cheoljong's maternal grandfather, Yeom Seong-hwa. As there were no other known descendants of Yeom Seong-hwa, based on the counterfeit, Yeom Jong-su became the heir of Yeom Seong-hwa in 1851, becoming an uncle of Cheoljong and an official in the government. In 1861, a member of Yongdam Yeom clan, named Yeom Bo-gil (염보길), who was Cheoljong's fourth cousin and living in Ganghwa Island, appealed the scam in grievance. As a result, Cheoljong interrogated Yeom Jong-su and had him executed.

=== Death and succession ===
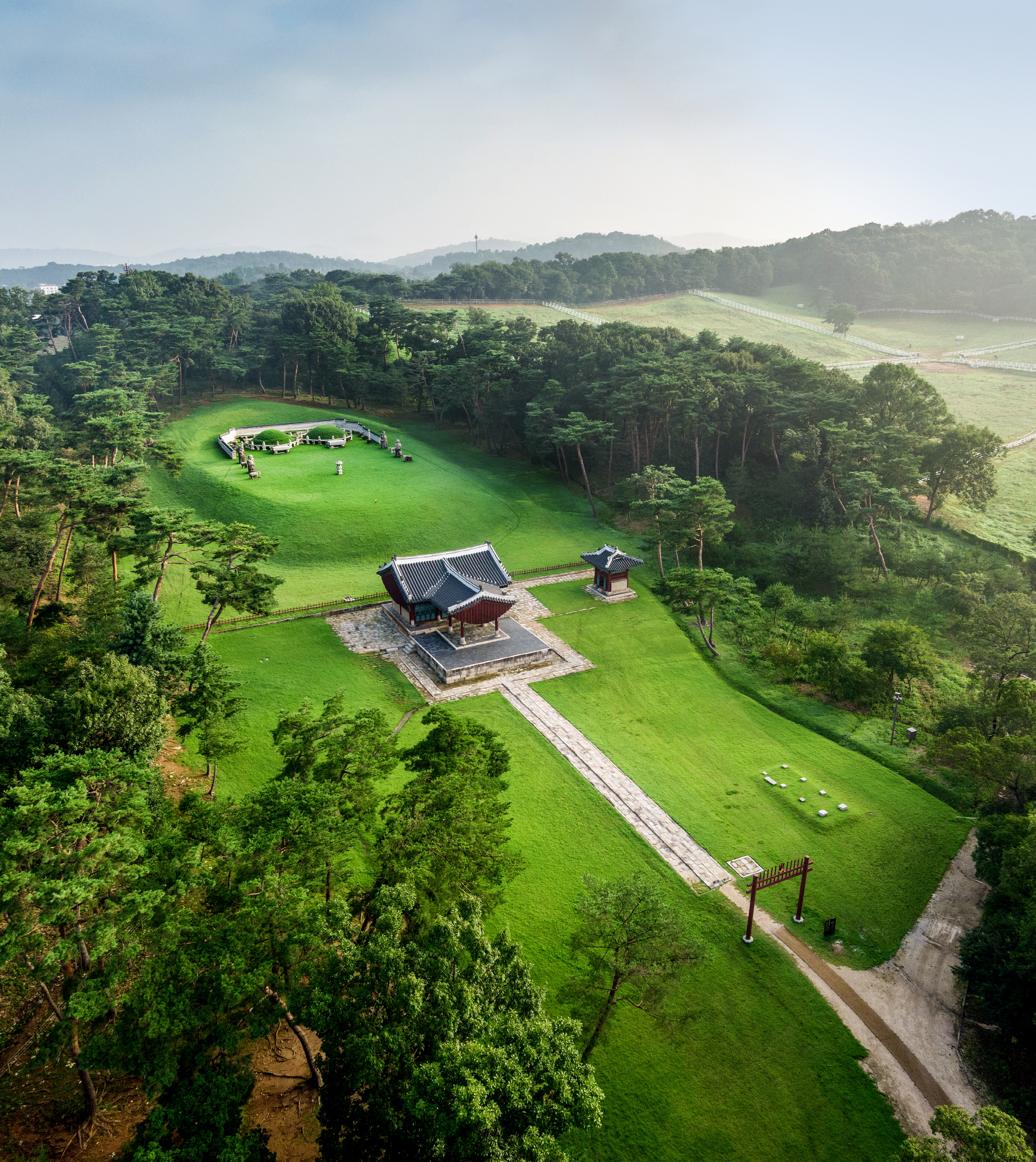
Yereung, the royal tomb of King Cheoljong and Queen Cheorin.

According to Ilseongnok ("Diary of Self-examination"), since Cheoljong ascended to the throne, he had a weak digestive system, causing a series of chronic disease throughout his life; Cheoljong also had symptoms of asthma and caught cold quite easily. In order to tone up the body, he took a large amount of herbal medicine for years; on the other hand, some other common treatments by the time, such as acupuncture and moxibustion, rarely appear in the documents. Cheoljong died at the age of 32 on January 16, 1864, without any surviving male heirs; he became the last king descended from King Hyojong. The cause of his death is ambiguous, as there was no clear official record about it. Some suggested that the cause of death of Cheoljong could be liver disease or tuberculosis; according to existing documents, however, it's still hard to give a certain conclusion to date.

It once again became necessary to search far back in the Jeonju Yi clan to find a candidate for accession, which became a dispute within the court. Cheoljong himself favored Yi Jae-hwang, the second son of Prince Heungseon (his seventh cousin) and his wife, Lady Min, to succeed the throne. Claiming that Prince Heungseon was still alive, making Yi Jae-Hwang an inappropriate candidate, most members of the Andong Kim clan disapproved of this succession. However, Kim Byeong-hak (김병학), a cousin of Queen Cheorin, strongly agreed because he financially supported Prince Heungseon. Queen Sinjeong, wife of late Ikjong (Crown Prince Hyomyeong) and the mother of King Heonjong, was the most supreme royal family member by the time, and she took way the national seal of Joseon; she decided to adopt Yi Jae-hwang herself and was supported by her family, the Pungyang Jo clan. On the other hand, Queen Cheorin, the widow of Cheoljong, believed that she could adopt the royal heir because of her family's power, so she delivered a royal order, asking Yi Jae-hwang to succeed the throne. Once Yi Jae-hwang arrived at the palace, Queen Sinjeong was overjoyed and she came out to welcome him in person, despite being inappropriate in court manners; she immediately announced that the new king was the heir of Ikjong, instead of Cheoljong. Yi Jae-hwang thus became the new king of Joseon, known as Gojong of Korea. Upon the accession of Gojong, the father of Gojong was honored as Heungseon Daewongun, who repressed the power of the Andong Kim clan and becoming a dictator himself in the next decade.

=== Legacy ===
Cheoljong was buried in the royal tomb, named Yereung, in 1864, part of the royal tomb Seosamneung Cluster located in Goyang, Gyeonggi Province. Queen Cheorin was also buried in Yereung after her death in 1878. According to the epitaph, there were once that some silverware used in the palace and the shrine of Jeongye Daewongun were stolen; both Cheoljong and Queen Cheorin decided not to pursue who did this, fearing that people may confess under false charges. Cheoljong had 11 children - five sons and six daughters - from his various consorts, but all of them died young. Among them, only the fourth daughter outlived him. She received the title Princess Yeonghye in 1866; as the only living child of Cheoljong, she received much affection from Queen Cheorin. Princess Yeonghye married Park Yung-hyo in 1872 but died in the same year, aged 13 and had no issue.

When Cheoljong died, there were only two royal descendants of King Hyojong alive. One of them was Cheoljong's half-brother, Prince Yeongpyeong (b. 1828); the other one was Yi Jae-seong (이재성, b. 1860), son of Cheoljong's first cousin, Prince Ikpyeong, with his concubine. Because of Queen Sinjeong's decision, both of them couldn't succeed the throne after Cheoljong. Prince Yeongpyeong was also chronically ill like his sibling, so Gojong chose a distant relative (10th cousin to Gojong) to be his heir in 1864. Prince Yeongpyeong had a daughter in 1866, who married Hwang Yeon-su (황연수) and had issue; the prince himself lived for several more decades and died in 1902. Yi Jae-seong, on the other hand, became Prince Gyeongeun (경은군) in 1900, but he lost the royal title in 1907, accused of working together with the anti-Japanese righteous army; he later went missing in 1910. Prince Gyeongeun was the last recorded royalty to be a descendant of Hyojong; while he married twice, he had no known descendants in official records.

According to Homer Hulbert's writings in the early 1900s, Cheoljong made efforts to introduce reforms that would tackle issues that plagued the Joseon dynasty, such as banning merchant monopolies, reducing bribery and corruption, and allowing the families of banished men to follow the men into exile. However, these reforms were often not followed as corruption was rampant by the late Joseon period.

== Family ==
- Biological father: Grand Internal Prince Jeongye (전계대원군; 29 April 1785 – 14 December 1841)
  - Grandfather: Prince Euneon (은언군; 22 February 1754 – 9 July 1801)
  - Legal grandmother: Princess Consort Sangsan (상산군부인), of the Jincheon Song clan (진천 송씨; 1753–1801)
  - Biological grandmother: Princess Consort Jeonsan (전산군부인), of the Jeonju Yi clan (전주 이씨; 1764–1819)
- Adoptive father: King Sunjo (순조대왕; 29 July 1790 – 13 December 1834)
- Biological mother: Grand Internal Princess Consort Yongseong (용성부대부인), of the Yongdam Yeom clan (용담 염씨; 1793–1834)
  - Grandfather: Yeom Seong-hwa (염성화)
  - Grandmother: Lady, of the Sangju Ji clan (상주 지씨)
- Adoptive mother: Queen Sunwon (순원왕후), of the (new) Andong Kim clan (신 안동 김씨; 8 June 1789 – 21 September 1857)

Consort(s) and their respective issue

- Queen Cheorin (철인왕후), of the (new) Andong Kim clan (신 안동 김씨; 15 April 1837 – 31 May 1878)
  - Yi Yung-jun (이융준), Prince Royal (원자; 22 November 1858 – 25 May 1859), first son (Note: "Yung-jun" was his childhood name, not given name.)
- Gwiin (귀인), of the Miryang Park clan (밀양 박씨; 1827 – 27 April 1889)
  - Unnamed son (1854)
- Gwiin (귀인), of the Pungyang Jo clan (풍양 조씨; 1 February 1842 – 25 December 1866)
  - Unnamed son (1859)
  - Unnamed son (1861)
- Gwiin (귀인), of the Yi clan (이씨)
  - Unnamed son (1862)
- Sugui (숙의), of the Onyang Bang clan (온양 방씨; ? – 6 November 1878)
  - Unnamed daughter (1851–1853)
  - Unnamed daughter (1853)
- Sugui (숙의), of the Geumseong Beom clan (금성 범씨; 3 September 1838 – 23 January 1884)
  - Princess Yeonghye (영혜옹주; 1858 – 3 September 1872), first daughter
  - Unnamed daughter
- Sugui (숙의), of the Gimhae Kim clan (김해 김씨; 25 April 1833 – ?)
  - Unnamed daughter (1856)
- Palace Lady (궁인), of the Yi clan (이씨)
  - Unnamed daughter
- Palace Lady (궁인), of the Park clan (박씨)
  - Unnamed daughter

== Ancestry ==
Ancestors of Cheoljong of Joseon

King Yeongjo (영조대왕)
King Jangjo (장조대왕)
Concubine Yeong, of the Jeonui Yi clan (영빈 전의 이씨)
Prince Euneon (은언군)
Im Chang-ju (임창주)
Concubine Suk, of the Buan Im clan (숙빈 부안 임씨)
Lady, of the Gimhae Kim clan (김해 김씨)
Grand Internal Prince Jeongye (전계대원군)
Yi Deok-hui (Note: Despite descending from the Jeonju Yi clan (House of Yi, the ruling house of Joseon), the exact genealogy is unclear.)
Princess Consort Jeonsan, of the Jeonju Yi clan (전산군부인 전주 이씨)
King Cheoljong
Yeom Sang-im (염상임)
Yeom Deok-seok (염덕석)
Lady, of the Jeonju Yi clan (전주 이씨)
Yeom Seong-hwa (염성화)
Kim Dong-ak (김동악)
Lady, of the Gimhae Kim clan (김해 김씨)
Grand Internal Princess Consort Yongseong, of the Yongdam Yeom clan (용성부대부인 용담 염씨)
Ji U-yeong (지우영)
Lady, of the Sangju Ji clan (상주 지씨)

== Gallery ==
=== Calligraphy by Cheoljong ===
A duilian written in semi-cursive script, reading "太平佳氣人有樂 祥瑞凞凞日至來" (Note: Translation: With peace and good atmosphere, people are happy; good omens and joy come daily.)

A regulated verse written in 1852

== In popular culture ==
- Portrayed by Kim Jung-hyun in the 2020 tvN TV series Mr. Queen.
- Portrayed by Jung Wook in the 2020 TV Chosun TV series Kingmaker: The Change of Destiny.

== See also ==
- History of Korea
- List of monarchs of Korea
- Styles and titles in Joseon
- Politics of Joseon

== Notes ==
Cheoljong of Joseon House of Yi Born: 25 July 1831 Died: 16 January 1864
Royal titles
Preceded by Heonjong	King of Joseon; 25 July 1849 – 16 January 1864	Succeeded by Gojong
