= Yi Yung-jun =

Yung-jun
- heir presumptive of Joseon
- Born: 22 November 1858 at Sinsi (15–17 o'clock); Grand Royal Hall of Changdeokgung, Joseon
- Died: 25 May 1859 (aged 6 months); Joseon
- Burial: 26 May 1859
Names
- Surname: Yi/Lee (이씨; Issi); Given childhood name: Yung-jun/Yoong-joon (융준; Yungjun) (Note: Said to be happy, King Cheoljong wrote some childhood name while lowering it to a signboard and choosing the most suitable one for his only (legitimate) son, who had already lived for 100 days. Some important ministers and many foreign relatives came to help the King choose the better name for his son. There were some choice about the name, such as: Hong-bok (홍복; 洪福); Jang-rok (장록; 長祿); Yun-jung (윤중; 胤重); Yung-jun (융준; 隆俊); Then, "Yung-jun" or "Yoong-joon" was the chosen one for this young prince.)
- House: House of Yi
- Father: Yi Byeon, King Cheoljong
- Mother: Queen Cheorin; Lady Beom (foster)

Yi Yung-jun (Korean: 이융준; Hanja: 李隆俊; 22 November 1858 – 25 May 1859) was an heir presumptive of Joseon (wonja, 원자, 元子) as the only son of Yi Byeon, King Cheoljong and Queen Cheorin. From birth, he became a Wonja, unlike his half-brothers. He died on 25 May 1859, at the age of six months, due to a fever. There is only a record that his mourning was held as a state funeral by order of King Cheoljong, and the location of his burial and whether he was given a posthumous title are unknown.

== Life ==
As soon as the prince was born, he was designated as the Crown Prince, and a Crown Prince's Palace was established on the same day. On November 2, King Cheoljong personally named the gate of the Crown Prince's Palace "Igyegmun" (貳極門). On November 22 of the same year, the Bureau of Astronomy reported to King Cheoljong that they had buried his umbilical cord at Bohyeolsan (伏結山) in Jucheonmyeon, Wonju-bu, Gangwon-do (currently Jucheonmyeon, Yeongwol-gun), in the direction of Haryang Imae (下壬坐丙向).

On March 30, 1859, King Cheoljong held the prince in his arms and met with his court officials. On April 23, 1859 (the 10th year of King Cheoljong's reign), he contracted a febrile illness and was attended by medical officials, but died suddenly. It is unclear what disease he died of. On April 24, King Cheoljong declared the mourning of the Crown Prince (元子喪) and specially summoned the Minister of War and the Grand Marshal of Training.

The date he removed mourning clothes is unknown, and there are no records of him after 1859 in the Seungjeongwon Daily Records. The date of his burial is unknown, but he is buried in Yeonheemyeon, Goyang-gun, Gyeonggi-do. There is no record of his posthumous title in the Annals of the Joseon Dynasty or the Seungjeongwon Daily Records, so it is uncertain whether or not he was given a posthumous title.

Although Yung-jun died young, King Cheoljong's concubine, Lady Jo Gwi-in (貴人 趙氏), bore him two sons. Unfortunately, both sons died shortly after birth, in 1859 and 1861. As a result, King Cheoljong did not have further sons and became the last monarch among King Hyojong 's descendants. After the establishment of the Korean Empire, his father, King Cheoljong, and his mother, Queen Cheorin, were posthumously honored as Emperor and Empress, but he was not posthumously honored as Crown Prince. During the Japanese occupation, he was re-interred in the Seosamneung Tomb Complex for Princes and Princesses. The exact year is unknown because the Japanese era year on the tombstone was scratched off.
