= Geumseong Beom clan =

Korean clan from South Jeolla Province

- Country: Korea
- Current region: Naju
- Founder: Beom Seung-jo

Geumseong Beom clan (Korean: 금성 범씨; Hanja: 錦城 范氏) is one of the Korean clans. Their bongwan is in Naju, South Jeolla Province. According to the research held in 2000, the number of Geumseong Beom clan's members was 3316. Their founder was Beom Seung-jo who was from Langya Commandery in China. He entered Goryeo as a fatherly master of Princess Jeguk who had a marriage to arrangement with King Chungnyeol in 1274. Beom Seung-jo had worked in the Ministry of Rites in the Yuan dynasty. Beom Yu-su (范有睢), a son of Beom Seung-jo, was appointed as munha sirang pyeongjangsa (문하시랑평장사; 門下侍郞平章事) in Goryeo. Beom Yu-su made achievements as a commander during the suppression of the Jurchens in 1334. He was recognized as a meritorious official (功臣) and became Prince of Geumseong. Then, Beom Yu-su officially started the Geumseong Beom clan and made Geumseong their bongwan.

== See also ==
- Korean clan names of foreign origin
