= Onyang Bang clan =

Korean clan from South Chungcheong Province

- Country: Korea
- Current region: Asan
- Founder: Bang Ji
- Connected members: Bang Min-ah; Sung Joon; Bang Yong-guk; Sung Hoon; Bang Sin-bong; Bang Soo-hyun; Bang Jeong-hwan; Bang Ye-dam; Bang Chan; Hannah Bahng
- Website: http://www.onyangbang.kr/

Onyang Bang clan (Korean: 온양 방씨; Hanja: 溫陽 方氏) is a Korean clan. Their Bon-gwan is in Asan, South Chungcheong Province. As of 2015, there are about 80445 members of this clan. Their founder was Bang Ji, who brought Confucian texts in Silla as the Tang alliance's envoy in 669. After that, he settled in Sangju.

== See also ==
- Korean clan names of foreign origin
