= Prince Euneon =

Royal prince of the Joseon Dynasty

Yi In 이인
- Prince Euneon

Prince of Joseon
- Born: Yi In; 29 March 1754
- Died: 30 July 1801 (aged 47)
- Father: Crown Prince Sado
- Mother: Royal Noble Consort Suk of the Buan Im clan

Prince Euneon (Korean: 은언군; Hanja: 恩彦君) (29 May 1754 – 30 June 1801), personal name Yi In (Korean: 이인; Hanja: 李䄄), was a royal prince of the Joseon Dynasty. He was the grandfather of the 25th King of Joseon, King Cheoljong. After the death of Crown Prince Sado, he was exiled to Ganghwa Island. He was later executed in the 1801 Catholic Purge, due to having a Roman Catholic wife.

== Family ==
- Father - King Jangjo of Joseon (13 February 1735 – 12 July 1762) (조선 장조)
  - Grandfather - King Yeongjo of Joseon (조선 영조) (31 October 1694 – 22 April 1776)
  - Grandmother - Royal Noble Consort Yeong of the Jeonui Lee clan (영빈 이씨) (15 August 1696 – 23 August 1764)
- Mother - Royal Noble Consort Suk of the Buan Im clan (? - 1773) (숙빈 임씨)
  - Grandfather - Im Ji-beon (임지번)
  - Grandmother - Lady Kim of the Gimhae Kim clan (김해 김씨)
- Sibling(s)
  - Younger Brother - Yi Jin, Prince Eunsin (11 January 1755 – 29 March 1771) (이진 은신군)
- Consorts and their respective issue(s)
  - Princess Consort Sangsan of the Jincheon Song clan (상산군부인 진천 송씨) (15 October 1753 – 4 April 1801), catholic name Mary
    - Son - Yi Dam, Prince Sanggye (상계군 이담) (21 January 1769 – 20 November 1786)
    - Son - Yi Chang-sun (이창순)
    - Son - Yi Chang-deok (이창덕)
    - Son - Yi Dang, Prince Punggye (풍계군 이당) (1 February 1783 – 8 May 1826)
    - Daughter - Lady Yi of the Jeonju Yi clan (전주 이씨) (4 August 1796 – 4 April 1872)
  - Unnamed concubine
    - Son - Yi Seong–deuk (이성득) (1775 –27 November 1817)
    - Son - Prince Yi Cheol–deuk (이철득) (1780 - ?)
  - Princess Consort Jeonsan of the Jeonju Yi clan (전산군부인 전주 이씨) (19 December 1764 - 4 June 1819); daughter of Yi Deok‐hui (이덕희)
    - Unnamed son; died prematurely
    - Son - Yi Gwang, Grand Internal Prince Jeongye (전계대원군 이광) (21 March 1785 – 2 November 1841)
