= Queen Cheorin =

Queen of Joseon from 1851 to 1864

Queen Cheorin 철인왕후 哲仁王后

Queen dowager of Joseon
- Tenure: 16 January 1864 – 12 June 1878
- Predecessor: Queen Dowager Myeongheon
- Successor: None

Queen consort of Joseon
- Tenure: 17 November 1851 – 16 January 1864
- Predecessor: Queen Hyojeong
- Successor: Queen Myeongseong
- Born: 27 April 1837; Sunhwa-bang District, (Note: Located within modern-day Hyoja-dong, Jongno District.) Hanseong, Joseon
- Died: 12 June 1878 (aged 41); Yanghwadang Hall, Changgyeonggung, Joseon
- Burial: Yereung Royal Tomb, Seosamneung Cluster, Goyang, Gyeonggi Province
- Spouse: Cheoljong of Joseon (m. 1851–1864)
- Issue: Yi Yung-jun
Posthumous name
- (see below)
- House: Andong Kim clan
- Father: Kim Mun-geun
- Mother: Internal Princess Consort Heungyang of the Yeoheung Min clan

- Queen Cheorin
- Hangul: 철인왕후
- Hanja: 哲仁王后
- Revised Romanization: Cheorin wanghu
- McCune–Reischauer: Ch'ŏrin wanghu

Pseudonym
- Hangul: 효휘전
- Hanja: 孝徽殿
- Revised Romanization: Hyohwijeon
- McCune–Reischauer: Hyohwijŏn

Queen Cheorin (Korean: 철인왕후; Hanja: 哲仁王后; 27 April 1837 – 12 June 1878), of the Andong Kim clan, was queen consort of Joseon by marriage to King Cheoljong. She was known as Queen Dowager Myeongsun (명순대비) after the death of her husband and during King Gojong's reign. When King Gojong proclaimed the Korean Empire, the Queen was posthumously given the title of Cheorin, the Symbolic Empress (철인장황후; 哲仁章皇后).

== Biography ==
=== Early life and marriage ===
Lady Kim was born into the (new) Andong Kim clan (신 안동 김씨; 新 安東 金氏) on 27 April 1837 as the eldest daughter of Kim Mun-geun and his second wife, Lady Min of the Yeoheung Min clan. She had one younger brother.

As part of the Andong Kim clan's manipulation of King Cheoljong through Queen Sunwon, the 14-year-old Lady Kim married the 20-year-old King Cheoljong on November 17, 1851. As queen, it is said that she was not involved and did not side with her family in royal politics as she kept to herself.

As the parents of the Queen consort, Lady Min received the royal title of "Internal Princess Consort Heungyang of the Yeoheung Min clan" (흥양부부인 여흥 민씨; 興陽府夫人 驪興 閔氏). While her father received the royal title of "Internal Prince Yeongeun" (영은부원군; 永恩府院君). Her father's first wife, Lady Yi, also received the royal title of "Internal Princess Consort Yeonyang of the Yeonan Yi clan" (연양부부인 연안 이씨; 延陽府夫人 延安 金氏) as she was also considered the mother of Lady Kim.

The Queen eventually gave birth to a son, Prince Royal Yi Yung-jun on 22 November 1858, but he died 6 months and 3 days later on 25 May 1859.

As Cheoljong fell deeper under his illness, the Grand Royal Queen Dowager Sinjeong saw an opportunity to advance the cause of the Pungyang Jo clan (the only true rival of the Andong Kim clan).

=== Life as queen dowager and later life ===
The 33-year-old King Cheoljong died on 16 January 1864 within Daejojeon Hall in Changdeokgung. The cause of his death is ambiguous, as there was no clear official record about it. Some suggested that the death of cause of Cheoljong could be liver disease or tuberculosis; according to existing documents, however, it is still hard to give a certain conclusion to date.

According to Ilseongnok ("Diary of Self-examination"), since Cheoljong ascended to the throne, he had a weak digestive system, causing a series of chronic disease throughout his life. Cheoljong also had symptoms of asthma and caught cold quite easily. Thus leaving the throne vacant and in need of an heir.

The selection of the next king was in the hands of three dowagers: Queen Dowager Hyoyu, the widow of Crown Prince Hyomyeong and mother of King Heonjong, Queen Dowager Myeongheon, the widow of King Heonjong, and Queen Dowager Myeongsun, King Cheoljong's wife.

Queen Dowager Hyoyu was approached by Yi Ha-eung, a descendant of King Injo (r. 1623–1649), whose father was made an adoptive son of Prince Eunsin, a grandson of King Yeongjo (r. 1724–1776). Yi Ha-eung's family branch belonged to an obscure line of descent of the Jeonju Yi clan, which had survived the often deadly political intrigue that frequently embroiled the Joseon court by forming no affiliations. Yi Ha-eung himself was ineligible for the throne due to a law that dictated that any possible heir had to be part of the generation after the most recent incumbent of the throne, but his second son Yi Myeong-bok (future Emperor Gojong), was a possible successor.

The Pungyang Jo clan saw that Yi Myeong-bok was only twelve years old and would not be able to rule in his own name until he came of age, and that they could easily influence Yi Ha-eung, who would be acting as regent for the future King. As soon as news of Cheoljong's death reached Yi Ha-eung through his intricate network of spies, he and the Pungyang Jo clan took the royal seal – an object that was considered necessary for a legitimate reign to take place and aristocratic recognition to be received – effectively giving Queen Sinjeong absolute power to select the successor to the throne. By the time Cheoljong's death had become a known fact, the Andong Kim clan was powerless according to the law.

On 16 January 1864, Yi Myeong-bok was appointed as Prince Ikseong by Grand Queen Dowager Sinjeong, and the next day, his father was granted the title of Grand Internal Prince (Daewongun).

A few days later on January 21, Yi Myeong-bok was enthroned as King Gojong, and Dowager Queen Sinjeong began her regency.

Since Gojong was 12 years old, Queen Sinjeong invited the Daewongun to assist his son in ruling. She virtually renounced her right to be regent, and though she kept the title, the Daewongun was in fact the true ruler.

The Queen Dowager Myeongsun did not intervene when the Daewongun reduced then ended the power of the Andong Kim clan's, and soon afterwards that also of the Pungyang Jo clan.

She later died on 12 June 1878 within Yanghwa Hall in Changgyeonggung, and is buried in Yereung, Seoul, with her husband.

== Family ==
- Father
  - Kim Mun-geun (김문근; 金汶根; 25 November 1801 – 6 November 1863)
- Mother
  - Biological - Internal Princess Consort Heungyang of the Yeoheung Min clan (흥양부부인 여흥 민씨; 興陽府夫人 驪興 閔氏; 1807–1872); Kim Mun-geun's second wife
  - Step - Internal Princess Consort Yeonyang of the Yeonan Yi clan (연양부부인 연안 이씨; 延陽府夫人 延安 金氏; 1799–1824)

Sibling(s):

- Younger brother - Kim Byeong-pil (김병필; 金炳弼; 1839–1870)

Husband

- King Cheoljeong of Joseon (25 July 1831 – 16 January 1864)

Issue

- Son - Prince Royal Yi Yung-jun (원자 융준; 元子 隆俊; 22 November 1858 – 25 May 1859)

== Titles ==
- 27 April 1837 – 12 June 1878: Lady Kim, daughter of Kim Mun-geun of the Andong Kim clan
1. Lady Kim (안동 김씨; 安東 金氏)
2. Kim Mun-geun's daughter (김문근의 딸; 金汶根之 女)
- 17 November 1851 – 16 January 1864: The Queen Consort of Joseon (조선 왕비; 朝鮮 王妃)
- 16 January 1864 – 26 March 1866: The Queen Dowager of Joseon (조선 대비; 朝鮮 大妃)
- 26 March 1866 – 12 June 1878: Queen Dowager Myeongsun (명순 대비; 明純 大妃)

=== Posthumous title ===
- Joseon
  - Full formal title: Queen Myeongsun Hwiseong Jeong'won Suryeong Gyeongheon Jangmok Cheorin of Joseon (명순휘성정원수령경헌장목철인왕후; 明純徽聖正元粹寧敬獻莊穆哲仁王后)
  - Short informal title: Queen Cheorin (철인왕후; 哲仁王后)
- Korean Empire
  - Full formal title: Empress Myeongsun Hwiseong Jeong'won Suryeong Gyeongheon Jangmok Cheorin Jang of the Korean Empire (명순휘성정원수령경헌장목철인장황후; 明純徽聖正元粹寧敬獻莊穆哲仁章皇后)
  - Short informal title: Empress Cheorin Jang (철인장황후; 哲仁章皇后)

== In popular culture ==
- Portrayed by Jo Nam-gyeong in the 1982 KBS1 TV series Wind and Cloud
- Portrayed by Chae Yoo-mi in the 1990 MBC TV series Daewongun
- Portrayed by Yoo Hye-yeong in the 2001–2002 KBS TV series Empress Myeongseong
- Portrayed by Shin Hye-sun in the 2020 tvN TV series Mr. Queen.

== Notes ==
Preceded by Queen Hyojeong	Queen consort of Joseon; 1851–1864	Succeeded by Empress Myeongseong
