= Jeongye Daewongun =

Yi Gwang 이광
- Grand Internal Prince Jeongye
- Born: Yi Gwang; 21 March 1785
- Died: 2 November 1841 (aged 56)
- Spouse: Lady Choe; Lady Yeom; Lady Yi
- Issue: Prince Hoepyeong; Prince Yeongpyeong; Cheoljong of Joseon
- Father: Prince Euneon
- Mother: Princess Consort Jeonsan of the Jeonju Yi clan

Jeongye Daewongun (Korean: 전계대원군; Hanja: 全溪大院君; 21 March 1785 – 2 November 1841; lit. 'Grand Internal Prince Jeongye') was a member of the Korean Joseon dynasty as the biological father of King Cheoljong of Joseon. His personal name was Yi Gwang (이광; 李㼅), but he was also known as Kwae-deuk (쾌득; 快得) or Hae-dong (해동; 海東).

== Early life ==
Yi Gwang was born on March 21, 1785, in Ganghwa-do. His birth name was Kwae-deuk, which later changed to Hae-dong and after some years to Gwang.

He was one of several illegitimate sons of Prince Euneon and the second of two sons of Lady Yi of the Jeonju Yi clan. His older full-brother suffered an early death.

His legitimate eldest half-brother was Prince Sanggye, also known as Crown Prince Wanpung, who was an adopted son of Jeongjo of Joseon and heir to the throne for a short time in 1779.

His father, Prince Euneon, was an illegitimate son of Crown Prince Sado by his concubine, Royal Noble Consort Suk of the Buan Im clan; Sado himself was an illegitimate son of King Yeongjo of Joseon. This made Jeongye the half-nephew of King Jeongjo, but during his life, he did not receive the treatment of a member of the Royal Family.

In 1801, Prince Euneon was executed after his legitimate wife, Princess Consort Sangsan of the Jincheon Song clan, and his daughter-in-law, Princess Consort Shin of the Pyeongsan Shin clan (the wife of Prince Sanggye), had been baptized into the Roman Catholic Church. The Joseon Dynasty's state religion was Neo-Confucianism, so Princess Sangsan, Prince Euneon, and Princess Shin were all executed for treason.

Some of Prince Euneon's sons, including Yi Gwang, were exiled on Ganghwa Island, where they lived as poor farmers until 1822 when the family received a special pardon from King Sunjo.

On 2 November 1841, Grand Internal Prince Jeongye died at his home in Gyeonghaeng, Hanseong, at the age of 56. The cause of death is unknown.

== After death ==
In August 1841, the Noron faction plotted a coup d'état in order to crown Yi Won-gyeong, Yi Gwang's eldest child and only legitimate son, as the new King. However, the plot was detected, which led to the execution of Yi Won-gyeong. The sole survivors were Yi Gwang's two illegitimate sons, Yi Gyeong-eung and Yi Won-beom, who were again exiled to Ganghwa-do.

In 1849, his son, Yi Won-beom, born to a concubine named Lady Yeom, became the new monarch of Joseon as King Cheoljong. The title Daewongun was posthumously conferred on Prince Jeongye, making his full name Jeongye Daewongun.

He was originally buried in Jingwan, Eunpyeong District, Seoul, northwest of the grave of his father Prince Euneon, but he was moved to Yeoju, and in August 1851, to Seondan-ri, Pocheon-eup, near Wangbang Mountain.

== Family ==
- Father: Yi In, Prince Euneon (이인 은언군; 29 May 1754 – 30 June 1801)
  - Grandfather: King Jangjo of Joseon (조선 장조; 13 February 1735 – 12 July 1762)
  - Grandmother: Royal Noble Consort Suk of the Buan Im clan (숙빈 임씨; ?–1773)
- Mother: Princess Consort Jeonsan of the Jeonju Yi clan (전산군부인 전주 이씨; 19 December 1764 – 4 June 1819)
- Consorts and their Respective Issue:
  - Grand Internal Princess Consort Wanyang of the Jeonju Choi clan (완양부대부인 전주 최씨; 19 February 1804 – 19 February 1840)
    - Yi Wongyeong, Prince Hoepyeong (회평군 이명; 11 September 1827 – 6 September 1844), first son
  - Grand Internal Princess Consort Yongseong of the Yongdam Yeom clan (Note: Elevated to Budaebuin (부대부인; 府大夫人, i.e. Grand Internal Princess Consort), on the ascension of her son to the throne.) (용성부대부인 용담 염씨; 20 July 1793 – March 1834)
    - King Cheoljong (25 July 1831 – 16 January 1864), third son
  - Lady Yi (이씨)
    - Yi Gyeongeung, Prince Yeongpyeong (영평군 이경응; 20 July 1828 – 1 February 1902), second son

== Ancestry ==
Ancestors of Jeongye Daewongun

16. King Sukjong
8. King Yeongjo
17. Royal Noble Consort Suk of the Haeju Choi clan
4. Crown Prince Sado
18. Yi Yoo-beon
9. Royal Noble Consort Yeong of the Jeonui Yi Clan
19. Lady Kim
2. Prince Euneon
10. Im Ji-beon
5. Royal Noble Consort Suk of the Buan Im clan
11. Lady Kim of the Gimhae Kim clan
1. Yi Gwang, Jeongye Daewongun
6. Yi Deok-hee
3. Princess Consort Jeonsan of the Jeonju Yi clan
7.
