= Yi Ji-ham =

Korean scholar-bureaucrat (1517–1578)

- Hangul: 이지함
- Hanja: 李之菡
- RR: I Jiham
- MR: I Chiham

Yi Ji-ham (Korean: 이지함; 1517–1578) was a scholar, civil servant and fortune teller of the Joseon period of Korea. He used the courtesy names Hyeongbaek (형백; 馨伯), Hyeongjung (형중; 馨仲) and the art names Susan (수산; 水山) and Tojeong (토정; 土亭). He studied under Sŏ Kyŏngdŏk and mastered the classics. He is remembered for his modesty, his dedicated efforts towards the working class and his practical skills in administration. He was also a master of pungsu (Korean geomancy/Feng shui) and is the attributed author of the Tojeong Bigyeol, a system of divination and fortune telling as well as a compilation of his predictions that appeared in the 19th century.

== Early life ==
Yi Ji-ham was born in Boryeong in Chungcheong Province in 1517, during the reign of King Jungjong. A sixth-generation ancestor of Yi Ji-ham was Yi Saek (1328–1396). Yi Saek believed in the co-existence of the "Three Disciplines": Confucianism, Buddhism and Taoism. Nonetheless, Yi Saek was instrumental to the change of mind that led to the founding of Joseon, and the rule of Neo-confucianism over Korea.

Yi Ji-ham's father, Yi Chi (李稚, 1477–1530) was the magistrate of Suwon and Fourth State Councilor (좌찬성; 左贊成). He died when his son was fourteen. After that, Yi Ji-ham studied under his elder brother, Yi Ji-beon, 이지번 (李之蕃). The later lived a quiet life in semi-retirement. Nevertheless, his first son Yi San-hae 이산해 (李山海, 1539–1609) was to become Chief State Councilor 1590–1592 and 1600–1602.

Yi Ji-ham continued his studies under Sŏ Kyŏngdŏk, a neo-Confucian naturalistic philosopher, who had many merchants in his following, which led Yi to be receptive to innovative social and economic ideas, such as deviating from Confucianism as long as it was for the benefit of the people. Moreover, he learned cosmology 역학 (易學), astrology 천문 (天文), divination 복서 (卜筮) and medicine. In 1547, the Yangjae Station Graffiti Incident and other literati purges put his family in disrepute, since his father in law was implied and put to death.

Rather than searching for honors, Yi Ji-ham lived as a wandering scholar and wanted to face the realities of working people across the country. He toured Joseon by boat and had a deep understanding of the sea, being able to successfully voyage to Jeju Island three times. Since he was often sailing, he was given the moniker 수선(水仙), a joke distorting his penname 수산(水山) into 水人山 meaning 물의 신선 i.e. water wizard. His aim was to teach poor people how to produce goods and create businesses in order to develop self-sufficiency. He also promoted and believed in the value of markets and trade, together within the country and overseas, to improve the working class standard of living, an uncommon view at a time when merchants were generally frowned upon.

He anchored his life in a modest pavilion he built out of mud near Mapo Naru (near what is now 토정 로, Tojeong-ro, just opposite the Mapo Bridge). When this 10-foot mud hut remained intact even after a big flood, Yi earned the moniker of Tojeong 土亭, meaning "clay pavilion."

He is known for his many anecdotes of bizarre behavior and eccentricity such as wearing an iron cast pot for a hat while he traveled.

== Political career ==
His ban was lifted at the coronation of Seonjo, and Yi Ji-Ham began an administrative career at the age of 57 (in 1573, Seonjo's 6th year). He was selected in recognition of his virtue and abilities. The following year, he became the Pocheon Hyeongam (현감 縣監, i.e. the magistrate of Pocheon County, rank 6b). For the hungry, Yi Ji-ham tried to melt the silver ore buried in the mountains, dig up jade, catch fish, or roast salt to buy grain from these activities. Using his results as proof of his economic choices, he tried to petition the Court, but received only a strong rejection, forcing him to resign.

In the year of his death, he was called up as the magistrate of Asan County to deal with another famine. He established a beggar's hall (乞人廳) and began to help the poor and the elderly. But rather than just being a charity organization, the agency was a job training and rehabilitation center which learned the people how to do simple tasks that could fetch some money in the market, such as making straw ropes and catching fish. This was indeed a novel concept for that time and place.

== Legacy ==
As a result, Yi Ji-ham's name became often cited by the people as an exemplar of the ideal for a public official, a mongmingwan (목민관, true shepherd of people). Giving a practical example of caring for the people and pushing through real life reforms and improvements was important at a time when there was increasing resistance in Joseon Korea against neo-Confucianism. Yi Ji-ham if often perceived as a forerunner of the Silhak (practical learning) movement.

In 1610, the Hwaam Seowon was built at Cheong Ramyun Jangsan-ri, Boryeong-si, Chungcheongnam-do to commemorate the scholarship and virtue of Yi Ji-ham and Yi San-bo. His writings were collected into a Tojeong-yugo.

Yi Ji-ham is also credited with writing the Secret of Tojeong (土亭秘訣, Tojeong bigyeol). This work is a compilation of predictions based on birthdates and trigrams from the Book of Changes, and is supposed to contain

- a prediction of his father-in-law's death from a massacre of scholars
- a prediction of Japan's 1592 invasion of Korea

But there is a theory that this book only appeared in the late 19th century, and that the author only borrowed Yi Ji-ham's name (Tojeong). And added some 'predictions after the fact' to create confidence into the predictive power of the book. Moreover, there is the following tale, reported by the Encyclopedia of Korean Folk Literature:

Yi Ji-ham had a daughter. And Yi could read in her face that if she became rich, she was destined for an early death. So Yi wrote his book Tojeongbigyeol for her, so that she could make a living as a fortuneteller. Her divinations turned out so accurate that Yi became worried she would soon be rich and fell under the malediction. So Yi revised his book, adding deliberate errors. This is why, even today, the book can sometimes lead to inaccurate divinations.

In any case, this work is translated and criticized in the Jorgensen's edition of the Jeonggamnok.

== Contemporary ==
After the Liberation, many reissues of the Tojeongbigyeol have appeared, ever larger each year. But, nowadays, the trend is rather to consider them as only an annoying disturbance from the fact that the real life Yi Ji-ham was a social thinker and a practical intellectual.

In 2015-09-16, the Mapo's Mayor inaugurated a 'Tojeong Lee Ji-ham Storytelling Street', including a statue depicting Tojeong as a wandering scholar, and a group of statues depicting the recolt of salt as organized by Tojeong.

Nowadays, Yi Ji-ham is often quoted as a practical person, a Silhak before the letter, putting economy and welfare of the people ahead of obscure doctrinal divergences.

== In fiction ==
- Portrayed by Joo Jin-mo in the 2016 MBC TV series Flowers of the Prison.

== Sources ==
- Doopedia "이지함 (李之菡)" [Yi Ji-ham]. Doosan Encyclopedia.
- Doopedia "이지번 (李之蕃)" [Yi Ji-beon]. Doosan Encyclopedia.
- EKFL Encyclopedia of Korean Folk Literature. 27 November 2014. ISBN 9788928900848.
- EncyKor "화암서원 (花巖書院)" [Hwaam Seowon]. Encyclopedia of Korean National Culture.
- Googlemaps "Tojeong-ro". Google Maps.
- Jeong Yong-in (2009-02-03). "[커버스토리]토정비결의 저자는 토정이 아니다" [[Cover Story] The author of Tojeongbigyeol is not Tojeong]. Weekly Kyunghyang. 9 Cover Stories about prophecies.
- Jorgensen: The Foresight of Dark Knowing: Chŏng Kam Nok and Insurrectionary Prognostication in Pre-modern Korea. Translated by John Jorgensen. Hawaii University Press. 2018. ISBN 9780824875381., 451 pages
- KBS "Lee Ji-ham, a far-seeing sage for the people". KBS World Radio. 2011-04-21.
- Kim Yong-man (2019-06-19). "이지함과 리더십" [Yi Ji-Ham and Leadership]. Money Today. Director Kim Yong-man is with the Korea Institute of History and Culture
- Lee Sang-yong (2020-04-12). "토정 이지함의 사회복지사상" [Tojeong Yi Ji-ham's Social Welfare Thought].
- Pratt, Keith L.; Rutt, Richard; Hoare, James (September 1999). Korea, A Historical and Cultural Dictionary. Routledge/Curzon. ISBN 978-0-7007-0464-4., 594 pages
- Seoul Sinmun "마포에서 들어 보는 '토정비결' 이야기" [Tojeong Lee Ji-ham Storytelling Street]. Seoul Shinmun. 2015-09-16.
