= Nam Sago =

Nam Sago (Korean: 남사고, Hanja: 南師古, 1509–1571) was a scholar of the Joseon period of Korea. He was well versed in mechanics 역학(易學), geomancy 풍수(風水), astrology 천문(天文), divination 복서(卜筮) and physiognomy 관상(觀相). In a first part of his adult life, he lived as a wandering scholar, traveling to famous mountains all over the country to detect auspicious sites. Under the name of Gyeogam 격암(格庵), he became known for poems and prose with prophetic intents. In his later years he served as Professor of Astronomy (천문학 교수, rank 6b) at Gwansanggam (觀象監).

== Appearances in the Records of Joseon Dynasty ==
During the reign of Seonjo, Nam Sago is quoted as an expert in pungsu (geomancy) 1593-01-12, art.3 (about the fortunes of the sky and fortune-telling) or 1600-07-26, art. 1 (about Selection and Creation of a Burial site). On the contrary, during the reign of Yeongjo 1733-08-18, art. 4, the works of Nam Sago are linked to a criminal case, while 1733-08-26, art. 2 is about banning them for being related to the Gwak Cheo-ung poster case. Indeed, the Joseon court was trying to enforce a separation between the geomancy issued from the approved Chinese texts and the native, politicized, geomancy of Korea.

== Works ==
Nam Sago is credited with writing the "Secret Predictions of Nam Sago" 남사고비결(南師古秘訣) as well as the 십승지 "Ten Excellent Sites for Protection and Good Luck [according] to the Geomancy of Nam Gyeoggam". These two texts were included in the compilation known as Jeonggamnok, which was probably collected in the 1600–1650 period.

On the contrary, it has been proven that the so-called Gyeogam Yurok (Nam Sago Prophecies) released in 1977 by Lee Do-eun was just a forgery, written after the events it was supposed to predict.

== Sources ==
- Doopedia "남사고 (南師古)" [Nam Sago]. Doosan Encyclopedia.
- EncyKor "남사고 (南師古)" [Nam Sago]. Encyclopedia of Korean National Culture.
- EncyKor "곽처웅괘서사건 (郭處雄掛書事件)" [Gwak Cheo-ung poster case]. Encyclopedia of Korean National Culture.
- OTD AKS, ed. (2011-01-07). 천문학교수 (天文學敎授) [Astronomy Professor]. Officer Title Dictionary.
- Jeong Sin-yeong (2015-01-08). "정감록에 기록된 10곳의 은신처 십승지(十勝地)" [Ten hidden places recorded in Jeonggamrok]. The Chosun Ilbo. Archived from the original on 2020-02-18.
- Jorgensen: The Foresight of Dark Knowing: Chŏng Kam Nok and Insurrectionary Prognostication in Pre-modern Korea. Translated by John Jorgensen. Hawaii University Press. 2018. ISBN 9780824875381., 451 pages
- Pratt, Keith L.; Rutt, Richard; Hoare, James (September 1999). Korea, A Historical and Cultural Dictionary. Routledge/Curzon. ISBN 978-0-7007-0464-4., 594 pages
- Kim Hawon 김하원 (1995). 위대한 가짜 예언서(격암유록) [The great fake prophetic book (Gyeongam Yurok)]. 미리언 출판사 (Milian). ISBN 9788985700085., 294 pages
