= 19th-century peasant rebellions in Korea =

The 19th-century peasant rebellions in Korea were numerous peasant rebellions during the late Joseon period. Korea suffered from various social problems including economic inequality, high taxes, and corruption. As a result, sparking several peasant rebellions throughout the entire Korean peninsula.

== Background ==
=== Fall of the hierarchy system ===
During the late Joseon dynasty, a wave of industrialization swept through Korea. As the Korean population grew and the use of coinage spread, an expansive market economy developed. In the agricultural industry, cultivation of cash crops became widespread, and new farming techniques were invented to increase productivity. State-funded handicraft manufacturing gradually declined around the mid-17th century, as private workshops became abundant. In aquaculture, the creation of newer, efficient nets and fishing techniques innovated fisheries. Diplomatic relationships with Japan and China became normalized after the 17th century, which boosted international trade.

Growth brought drastic changes to Korea's hierarchy system. Rich landlords and merchants who belonged to the lower jungin or sangmin caste often purchased government positions and enjoyed rights that were legally reserved for the higher yangban class. On the other hand, economically struggling land-owning farmers and even members of the yangban class were often forced to recede to tenant farming.

Additionally, starting from the 18th century, the number of slaves(nobis) had substantially decreased as more members of the cheonmin caste became practically free from their former status. In 1801, during the reign of Sunjo, the Joseon government burned down all remaining lists of its remaining 66,067 public nobis, promoting all former public nobis into the yang-in(non-cheonmin) class. Although private nobis were still in existence, even they were decreasing in number. These disruptions in the old system led to the dispersion of new, rebellious ideas and social unrest as it became evident that the caste system, which formally dominated Korean society, was deteriorating.

=== The Three Taxation Systems ===
Before the Imjin War, taxes in the Joseon dynasty were collected through a land tax, (Note: Before coinage was minted during the 18th century, most taxes in Korea other than local produces were paid in rice.) a separate poll tax, and a levy of local produce. However, by the 19th century, this tripartite system was altered into the three systems of Jeonjeong, Gunjeong, and Hwangok. These three systems were known collectively as Samjeong (삼정; 三政; lit. 'three politics'). These systems were consistently abused for excessive, discriminative taxation, which often devastated the lives of impoverished peasants. In Korean history, this corruption in the Samjeong system is succinctly referred to as the Disorder of Samjeong (Korean: 삼정의 문란; Hanja: 三政 의紊亂).

==== Jeonjeong ====
Jeonjeong(전정; 田政; lit. 'farmland politics') was an aggregational term for a series of acts and administrations that managed land-based taxation. After the end of the Imjin War, Gwanghaegun of Joseon enacted the Daedong Act, which replaced levies of local goods and mandatory civil labor services with a land tax. During the mid-18th century, king Yeongjo enacted the Gyunyeok Act, which halved the amount of gun-pos (Note: (Korean: 군포; Hanja: 軍布), rice that was paid in place of mandatory military service) and imposed more taxes based on the size of farmland. Although these acts were meant to mitigate the burdens of conscription, they also resulted in increased taxation. Consequently, the Jeonjeong system rose in significance as farmland-based rice taxes became the predominant source of government revenue.

The Jeonjeong system was exploited in various ways. Despite it being compulsory that a land survey be made every 20 years, these surveys were often left undone, which led to a faulty and outdated agricultural census. Corrupt local officials, who were responsible for the surveys, often embezzled taxes in the process. Furthermore, government budgets became vulnerable to famine as revenue became increasingly reliant on taxed rice, leading the Joseon government to excessive, reckless taxation. Peasants were often forced to pay unauthorized taxes which were sometimes several times higher than what was lawfully levied. Barren, nonarable land was sometimes taxed. Occasionally, peasants were taxed for land they didn't own.

==== Gunjeong ====
Gunjeong(군정; 軍政; lit. 'military politics') was an aggregational term for a set of acts and policies which administered military administration and accounting. In the Joseon dynasty, all men who were between the ages of 16 and 60 and were above the cheonmin class were subject to conscription. After the 16th century, this conscription system was gradually altered into a taxation system of its own, as more subjects chose to pay a certain amount of gun-pos rather than become conscripts. In 1541, King Jungjong passed the Gunjeok-supoje(Korean: 군적수포제; Hanja: 軍籍收布制), which were a set of laws that normalized the gun-po system. This set of laws allocated mandatory gun-pos to every subject of conscription in lieu of the draft, where the revenue would then be used to hire soldiers. The Joseon government inflated the number of conscripts to increase revenue and imposed heavy dues on peasants, who were already vigorously burdened by land taxes. Peasants were often forced to pay the same dues several times to separate regional administrations. Children under the age of 16 were often unlawfully assigned dues, and the family members of dead and runaway peasants were assigned additional dues.

==== Hwangok ====
Hwangok(환곡; 還穀; lit. 'crop return') (Note: Also known as Hwanja(Korean: 환자; Hanja: 還上) or Jeonhwan(Korean: 전환; Hanja: 錢還)) was originally a welfare system where the government loaned crop during the spring lean season from April to May, when old crops were consumed and new crops were not yet ripe, and retrieved additional crops in the fall harvest season. Starting from Sejong's reign, 10% of all crop loans were levied as interest to replenish crops that were naturally lost during storage, and 10% of this interest crop was used for various government expenses. This collection of interest eventually transformed the Hwangok system into a taxation system of its own, and an essential means of restoring Joseon's administrative budget.

The Joseon government later became so reliant on the Hwangok system that Chŏng Yagyong criticized that "half of the national budget is reliant on taxes, and the other half is relying on Hwanja". Government expenses were often taken from crops that were stored for loans and not from interest, which depleted storages. During the mid-18th century, loans were handed out in coins to replace depleted crops. However, as crop prices were significantly higher in the annual spring lean season, peasants received depreciated loans that were significantly less than the crops they paid during the fall harvest season by actual value. Furthermore, regional magistrates(suryeongs) sometimes collected interest crops as compound interest, which further financially burdened the peasantry.

=== Corruption ===
Furthermore, as royal in-law members monopolized vital government positions through its "Sedo Politics", the Joseon government became increasingly plagued with corruption and began losing the trust of the Korean peasantry.

=== Opposition to the government ===
Opposition first appeared as passive forms of protest. Posters criticizing the government were posted on the walls and doors of palaces and fortresses(gwe-seo, 괘서). Several texts that prophesied the fall of the Joseon dynasty and the House of Yi, most notably the Jeonggamrok, became publicly widespread.

Starting from 1810, sporadic forms of active protests began evolving into bigger peasant revolts. The peasant rebellion of 1811 led by Hong Gyeong-rae became the first significant peasant uprising of a massive scale.

== Pyongan Province ==
=== Geographical discrimination ===
The first significant peasant revolts, including Hong Gyeong-rae's Rebellion, began in Pyongan Province. Thanks to its lucrative mining industry, Pyongan was then economically ahead of its neighboring provinces. Thus, it acted as a major trading hub for traders from Uiju and Pyongyang and was less influenced by the yangban nobles. Ironically, this aspect of commerce made the region a favored target of unfair, excessive taxation by the central government in Hanseong. Furthermore, restrictions on foreign trade were imposed on mine owners and merchants, and those who were from the region were often neglected from appointments in vital government positions even when they had passed the civil service examination.

=== Hong Gyeong-rae's Rebellion ===
Since 1801, local rebel leader Hong Gyeong-rae made plans for an organized revolt against the Joseon government. In 1811, a large famine had swept through the province, and local outrage, which had accumulated for years due to the government's discriminatory policies, was at its peak. Hong, who saw this as an opportunity, decided to finally put his plans into action later that year. By September 1811, Hong had gathered an army on the island Chudo, and managed to earn support from the wealthy landowners.

Hong's rebellion was immense in scale compared to past revolts, as it was a coordinated action that went under planning for ten years and saw participation from members from every caste. Hong's forces of approximately 1000 rebels first arose in Dabok-dong, Kasan-gun, and later occupied 9 towns(eups) north of the Chongchon River with overwhelming support from the local people. His forces captured most of the Gwanseo Region in ten days. However, after a defeat at the battle of Songrim, the rebel forces were pushed back to Jeongju Fortress. The rebels capitulated after a 4-month siege when governmental forces finally collapsed the walls of the fortress by using eleven tons of explosives dug under the wall. All male rebels above the age of ten were executed.

== Three southern provinces ==
Despite the revolts in Pyongan Province, the Joseon government showed little effort in improving the taxation system. Around the mid-19th century, during the reign of King Cheoljong, civil unrest spread throughout the entire peninsula. Rebellions were most violent in the three southern provinces of Chungcheong, Jeolla, and Gyeongsang.

In 1862, a small revolt in Danseong, Gyeongsang Province spread to nearby Jinju. The insurrection then dispersed throughout southern Korea and sparked a series of nationwide peasant revolts, known collectively as the Imsul Peasant Revolt. Peasant uprisings were recorded in 20 counties in Gyeongsang, 38 counties in Jeolla, 12 counties in Chungcheong, and partially happened in regions in the northern Gyeonggi, Hamgyeong, and Hwanghae Provinces as well.

The biggest driving cause of the revolt was excessive, unfair taxation. Corrupt government officials often unlawfully taxed dead people or infants, even when only those over fifteen were legally eligible for taxation. Moreover, most of the remainders were given to the landowner.

Among all the revolts, the revolts in Jinju and the rest of Jeolla province saw the fiercest fighting of all. Infuriated by the exploitative taxation policies of general (Note: Baek was Gyeongsang Province's Ubyeongsa(우병사; 右兵使), a provincial army general which had magisterial authorities.) Baek Nak-shin, the peasants of Jinju ransacked rich land-owning farmers and a government office under the lead of Yu Gye-Chun. Peasant hordes, who wore white headbands and were armed with clubs and bamboo spears, referred to themselves as cho-guns(woodcutters). The people of Jinju captured Baek and burned landlords Jeong Nam-seong, Seong Bu-in, and Choe Jin-sa at the stakes. Their sons were killed as well while attempting to save their fathers. The revolts continued until January 1863. The people of Gwangju even rode to Seoul.

== Later Revolts ==
Peasant revolts during this period of Korean history saw the participation of multiple social classes. Rich landlords and land-owning farmers often revolted with poor tenant farmers against government-appointed governors(suryeongs), tax collectors, and usurers.

The Korean government, rather than militarily suppression, initially attempted to appease the enraged peasant forces through governmental policies. Investigations of regional communities, prosecution of corrupt officials, and the establishment of the Samjeong-ijeongcheong(삼정이정청; 三政釐政廳; lit. 'department for the correction of the three taxation systems') saw partial success in alleviating the enraged peasantry. However, no fundamental reforms were made to the taxation system, and revolts continued even after the death of Choljeong in 1864. During the rule of regent Heungseon, several revolts, such as the 1869 Gwangyang Revolt, and Yi Pil-Je's Rebellion of 1871, emerged. These events weakened the Joseon government, ultimately leading to the Donghak Peasant Revolution of 1894.

== List of Rebellions ==
List of rebellions in chronological order:

- Hong Gyeong-rae's Rebellion (1811)
- Imsul Peasant Revolt(1862)
- Gwangyang Revolt (1869)
- Yi Pil-Je's Rebellion (1871)
- Donghak Peasant Revolution (1894)

== Bibliography ==
- Choe, Yongbeom (2007). 하룻밤에 읽는 한국사 [Reading Korean History in One Night] (in Korean). Seoul: Paper Road. pp. 1–426. ISBN 9788-9958-2663-8.
- 전국역사교사모임(National History Teachers' Association) (March 4, 2019). "9". 살아있는 한국사 교과서 1: 민족의 형성과 민족 문화 [Living Korean History Textbook 1: National Formation and National Culture] (in Korean). Vol. 1. 휴머니스트. ISBN 9791160802023 – via Naver지식백과.
- Yu, Gyeong-won (2005). 이현세의 만화 한국사 바로보기. 9(조선시대) [Quick view of Yi Hyeonse Manhwas about Korean History. 9 (Joseon Dynasty)] (in Korean). 녹색지팡이, Noksaek Jipangi. pp. 1–235. ISBN 9788-9914-8109-1.
