= Docham =

Korean tradition of prophecy and omens

Docham (Korean: 도참; Hanja: 圖讖; RR: docham; MR: toch'am) is the Korean tradition of prophecies and omens about the future, especially about the rise and fall of kingdoms. Books of such prophecies, often called bigi (비기, "secret records") or bigyeol (비결, "secret formulas"), circulated in Korea from early times. Docham was closely tied to Korean geomancy and tended to appear when the country was in crisis.

== Origins ==
There are signs that prophetic writings, together with yin–yang theory and methods of divination, had reached Korea from China by the Three Kingdoms period. One early example is the Goguryeo bigi (Secret Record of Goguryeo). According to the Tang Huiyao, the New Book of Tang and the Samguk sagi, in 668 the Tang official Jia Yanzhong told Emperor Gaozong that this book foretold Goguryeo's destruction by an eighty-year-old general. Only this prediction survives, not the book itself. The story's reliability has been questioned, because it seems to have grown up around the Tang general Li Shiji, and accounts of Goguryeo's fall tend to favour Silla and Tang.

== Doseon and Goryeo ==
The figure most closely linked with Korean docham is Doseon, a Buddhist monk of late Silla who is best known as a master of geomancy. Several prophetic books were attributed to him, including Doseon bigi. According to tradition, in 875 Doseon predicted that a noble person would be born in two years' time, and the future founder of Goryeo, Wang Geon, was then born at Songak. For this reason later Goryeo kings honoured Doseon highly.

Wang Geon relied on prophecy as well as on Buddhism. In the Ten Injunctions (Hunyo sipjo), the instructions he left to his successors, the second injunction says that temples must be built only on the sites Doseon had chosen by reading the land. Building elsewhere would damage the land's virtue and weaken the dynasty, as had happened at the end of Silla. Temples and pagodas built on such sites were called bibo satap ("supplementing temples and pagodas").

== Joseon ==
Yi Seong-gye, the founder of Joseon, was also strongly influenced by geomancy combined with docham, and he used it to strengthen his rule. Debates about where to build the new capital, with candidates such as Hanyang and Gyeryongsan, drew on these ideas.

The best-known and most wide-ranging docham book is the Jeonggamnok, a collection of dozens of prophetic texts whose authors and date are unknown. Because of its anti-dynastic content, it was banned from the Joseon period onwards and passed on in secret. Docham books like it appeared mostly when the country was in decline. They gave ordinary people a sense that the age was ending and a reason to reject a corrupt present, and they fed hopes that a saviour would come. The Jeonggamnok also lists ten "places of refuge" (sipseungjiji) where people could survive war and disaster.
