= Sinmirok =

Korean novel

Sinmirok (辛未錄 Record of the Incidents in the Sinmi Year) is a traditional Korean novel that describes the incident known as the “Hong Gyeong-nae Rebellion” that began on December 18, 1811 (in the 11th reign year of King Sunjo of Joseon) and lasted for four months.

== Authorship ==
Sinmirok was first published in 1861 as a banggakbon, a book privately printed for commercial purposes. The author is unknown.

== Plot ==
Hong Gyeong-nae (洪景來) was born in Yonggang, Pyeongan Province. From a young age, Hong proved himself to be exceptionally talented. However, the Royal Court at the time discriminated against people from the Pyeongan, Hwanghae, and Hamgyong Provinces—rarely, if ever, appointing them to positions within the administration. Deeply unhappy with this situation, Hong plotted a rebellion with his comrades, Kim Sayong (金士用), U Gunchik (禹君則), and Lee Jecho (李濟初). He gathered around a thousand people in support and led them to Dabokdong, a place in Pyeongan Province that he made his base, where they gathered weapons and strategized.

Coincidentally, that year was a bad harvest year for the farmers and the corrupt officials continued their tyrannical behavior as the people grew increasingly resentful and angry. Seizing this ripe opportunity, Hong Gyeong-nae deemed himself the leader of the dissatisfied people and made Kim Sayong his second commander and U Gunchik as his tactician and together, they led an attack on Gasan county. There, they murdered the county governor as he attempted to repel their forces. Hong Gyeong-nae forced open the storehouse and distributed grain among the people, prompting numerous peasants to join Hong in support. With the help of his subordinate commanders, Hong also seized the neighboring counties. Numerous counties, including Jeongju, Taecheon, Cheolsan, and Yongcheon, joined Hong Gyeong-nae's peasant army. Kim Iksun, then the leader of the town of Seoncheon and the future grandfather of Kim Satgat, who would become one of the most famous wandering poets of Korea, also surrendered to Hong's forces. Though he could have immediately attacked the town of Anju (located in Pyeongan Province), Hong decided to first attack Bakcheon and Yeongbyeon and only afterwards, advance to Anju. However, his two subordinate commanders adamantly believed that they needed to attack Anju first in order to succeed and was dismayed by a plan that they were sure would lead to utter failure and plotted to assassinate Hong in the middle of night. Although the assassination attempt ultimately failed, Hong sustained grave injuries and their plans suffered serious setbacks. In that time, the government forces were able to re-organize and arm themselves and set out on a fierce counterattack. Hong led his army and penetrated the fortress at Jeongju where they begin their siege. Although the government army used all their strength in their attempts to recapture the Jeongju fortress, they ultimately failed. As the siege lengthens, the peasant army's food supplies become depleted and morale significantly drops. Eventually, the government army decide to dig underground tunnels beneath the fortress and use gunpowder to explode the fortress, finally succeeding in invading the fortress as it collapses. Upon entering the fortress, the government forces conduct a large massacre, killing anyone they counter with an inestimable number of casualties. Together with his close associates, the injured Hong Gyeong-nae attempts to escape, but is ultimately shot dead. However, there are still those who believe that he survived and is still alive.

== Features and Significance ==
Traditional Korean novels that center around Hong Gyeong-nae's rebellion include Sinmirok, Hong Gyeong-nae jeon (홍경래전 The Tale of Hong Gyeong-nae) and Hong Gyeong-nae silgi (홍경래실기 The True Record of Hong Gyeong-nae). Among these, Sinmirok is classified as the work that narrates the events surrounding Hong Gyeong-nae's rebellion from the perspective of the government forces. Hong Gyeong-nae silgi also narrates the events from the government forces’ perspective, but still portrays Hong Gyeong-nae as a hero, while Hong Gyeong-nae jeon is considered the work that most strongly presents Hong Gyeong-nae as being on the side of the people and the masses.

Sinmirok can be considered one of the representative works that demonstrates the flow of historical changes brought by the development of Korean publishing in the latter half of the Joseon dynasty. Although the government army's perspective is greatly reflected, the very fact that a book dealing with a riot in Seoul was published also shows that the general masses in those days were also acutely interested in societal changes. As large quantities of information and knowledge circulated through the popularity of hangeul, the Korean alphabet, and commercial publishing, they also became the catalyst for revolution. In 1862, the year after Sinmirok was published, the Jinju Peasants Uprising also broke out.

== Archival Materials ==
Along with Sinmirok, there are two other works that describe this incident: Hong Gyeong-nae jeon and Hong Gyeong-nae silgi. There are also two versions of this story in the form of song: Jeongjuga (定州歌 Song of Jeongju) and Jeongju seungjeon gok (定州勝戰曲 Victory Song of Jeongju).
