= Jeonggamnok =

Collection of Korean prophetic writings

The Jeonggamnok (Korean: 정감록; Hanja: 鄭鑑錄) (also known as Chŏng Kam nok) is a compilation of prophetic works which foretold the downfall of the Korean Yi (Joseon) dynasty and the establishment of a new utopian dynasty by a messianic "True Man" with the surname Jeong (Chŏng). Ideologies expressed in this work inspired many insurrectionist movements or claims of political legitimacy from the Joseon period to the present. The contents were circulated orally and in handwritten manuscripts since the middle of the Joseon period. They were copied and recopied many times and often the copyists updated the text to conform to the latest events and trends. Historical compilations and manuscripts related to Jeonggamnok are stored at Kyujanggak Archive.

== Narrowly construed Jeonggam Record ==
Nowadays, Jeonggamnok is the name of a large corpus, composed of numerous works, most from the late 19th and early 20th centuries. However, some of the texts may have been written as early as 1390. Being targeted by a global ban during the late Joseon period, they have circulated underground, being hand-copied again and again. This process is actually under scholarly review and the current consensus is to use another name to design the eponymous text of this corpus, e.g. "Gam's revelations" (Gam Gyeol, 감결, 鑑訣) as done by Han Sung-Hoon.

These Revelations were written as a dialogue between two legendary characters, named Jeong Gam 정감(鄭鑑) and Yi Sim 이심(李沁) (shortened as Jeong and Sim in §1, and as Gam and Sim in §26). In this Gamgyeol, the fall of the Yi dynasty is predicted. The Yi dynasty was to be succeeded by the Jeong (Chŏng) dynasty, destined to last 800 years. This would be accomplished by a messianic "True Man" (眞人 i.e. awakened) who would lead an army from a sea island. The Jeong dynasty would establish a nearly utopian political order, but it was not to be everlastingly utopian. In the end, like all dynasties, it was predicted to become weak and corrupt. It was to be followed by other dynasties (Jo, Beom and so on).

It is generally agreed that some elements of the text were written just after the Imjin War (1592–1598) and the Qing invasion (1636), because it contains after-the-fact "predictions" of these events. Moreover, the fact that, circa 1750, "Jeonggamnok" was addressing precisely that text rather than a larger corpus can be inferred by various quotations from the Seungjeongwon Ilgy (i.e. the Crew Diary of the Joseon Dynasty). As emphasized by Han Seung-Hoon, Jeonjo describes this source as Questions and Answers from start to end.

== Broadly construed Jeonggamnok corpus ==
The Jeonggam Record was addressing the grievances of the Korean people due to the failure of the government to prevent foreign invasions and to the widespread corruption among the ruling class. Concurrently, other texts of the same kind appeared, often attributed to historical people. Among these "secrets" (비결) are the purported prophecies of the Silla monk Doseon (827–898) §8, the Koryo-Choson monk Muhak (무학, 1327–1405) §5, and the Joseon period seers Nam Sago (1509–1571) §§10, 11 and Yi Ji-ham (이지함, 李之菡, 1517–1578) §§23, 24. Taken together, they can be described as some Jeonggamnok galaxy.

These Jeonggamnok prophecies appear to have played an important role in various revolutionary movements. Furthermore, many of the numerous rebellions against the throne in Joseon, over its five centuries, were justified with references to fortune-telling. Consequently, there were attempts from the central power to suppress such works. One notable event in this regard was the order by King Sejo in 1458 that books of prophecy be collected and incinerated. Nevertheless, such works continued to circulate. Those suspected of resistance to the government were interrogated and often forced to admit they were wronged by some sort of prophecy. An early example of such an event occurred in 1739. Another one is the 1782-12-10 art. 3 entry of the Veritable Records of the Joseon Dynasty (Jeongjo sillok), which made it clear that the Jeonggamnok was banned.

Also, at that time it appears that copies in Korean script were circulating and were disseminated to groups by reading it out loud.

The first full compilation (handwritten) of this galaxy of texts was by the Japanese scholar Ayukai Fusanoshin 鮎貝房之進 which he transcribed in 1913. The name chosen for this compilation was "Jeonggamnok", enlarging the meaning of the Gamgyeol's title. For this work, Ayukai consulted manuscripts held by the Japanese Governor General of Korea. These are now part of the Kyujanggak Archive. His transcription was subsequently printed in Japanese by Hosoi Hajime in February 1923. The Japanese version, first distributed in Tokyo, was brought back to Korea but a Korean compilation by Kim Yongju (金用柱) came out two weeks after the Hosoi version was published and was far more popular in Korea. According to Pratt, this period was the moment when these various elements were taken as an interrelated corpus. The Hosoi compilation contained 35 titles; the Kim Yougju compilation contained 51 titles. The English edition provided by Jorgensen mostly follows Hosoi and contains 32 titles.

== Obscure writing ==
Most of the Jeonggamnok corpus was originally written in Chinese script, and was not redacted to be understood at first sight. In fact it was deliberately written in code. One of the ways the meaning was partially hidden was by glyphomancy, which is deconstruction of a Chinese character into elements to form other characters or combination of elements of characters to form a phrase in a kind of cryptic crossword. For example:

士者橫冠 The gentleman will wear a hat,
砷人脫衣 A divine man will take off its clothes,
走遢橫己 ki will be attached to the edge of chu
聖諱加八 eight will be added to the name of the sage

can be deciphered as

The gentleman 士 will wear a hat $\longrightarrow$ 壬
A divine man 砷人 will take off his clothes $\longrightarrow$ 申
ki 己 will be attached to the edge of chu 走 $\longrightarrow$ 起
Eight 八 will be added to Confucius' name 丘 $\longrightarrow$ 兵

leading to 壬申起兵 i.e. "troops will be raised in the year of imsin". This interpretation was used during the 1812 rebellion led by Hong Gyeong-nae 홍경래 洪景來, to legitimate the movement (1812 was an imsin year). As noted by Jorgensen, any slight alteration of the text by a copyist would undermine any interpretation. The Hosoi text has 聖諱横入 instead of 聖諱加八, leading to "the sage will cross into".

Another method of partially hiding meaning was by use of allegorical references. Baker in his review of Jorgensen noted the following example: "where the high-flying dragon arrives, the fallen wild goose will have regrets" was interpreted to mean that rulers who have risen to the heights of power need to be careful lest they lose their throne and become filled with regret. However, some passages appear impenetrable, e.g., "in one pitcher, a heaven (paradise) will be built and the hunting horse still loves". Furthermore, much of the text includes far more arcane codes based on geomancy, divination, and the like.

== Influences on Korean culture and history ==
=== Joseon period ===
The Korean scholar Kim Tak documented many instances in which the work was an important component of new religious and insurrectionist ideology. and Jorgensen referenced many of Kim Tak's textural interpretations in his English language translation. Religious sects with various ideologies inspired by the Jeonggamnok include: Bocheongyo (Poch'ŏn'gyo), Jeungsangyo (Chŭngsan'gyo), Baekbaekkyo (Paekpaekkyo), and Cheongnimgyo (Ch'ŏngnimgyo).

The Veritable Records of the Joseon Dynasty (Jeongjo sillok) explicitly mentions the so-called Mun Inbang treason case (Jeongjo 1782). The conspirators led by Mun Inban tried to incite a insurrection by "deceiving the people" through dissemination of Jeonggamnok

The Hong Gyeong-nae (Hong Kyŏngnae) rebellion (December 1811 to April 1812), was one of the largest and most serious during the Yi dynasty up to that point. It was fueled by a deep resentment by the people of the corrupt rulers. Its ideology took inspiration from Jeonggamnok, in its claim that the True Man Jeong would lead an army to establish a new dynasty. Hong Gyeong-nae propaganda claimed that their army was his vanguard force. In preparation for the rebellion the instigators spread the "song foretelling the future" which had lines nearly identical to "the gentleman will wear a hat" text in the Jeonggamnok quoted above. Geomancy was a key element of Jeonggamnok. Hong Gyeong-nae, one of the chief leaders of the rebellion, was a professional geomancer from Pyongan province who claimed that the gravesite of his father that he had chosen was a very auspicious site that would protect him. In the end the rebellion he instigated was brutally put down. Hong Gyeong-nae was shot and killed in the fighting along with most other leaders who either died in battle or were captured and executed. Thousands of others were also arrested and executed including boys as young as 10 years. Nevertheless, it provided momentum for other popular armed uprisings in different parts of Korea seeking a more just society.

Choe Je-u (Ch'oe Cheu; 1824–1864) was the founder of the Donghak religion (Eastern Learning) that opposed "Western Learning" (Catholicism). In a section of his book titled Ch'oe Cheu, the Tonghak religion, and the Chong Kam nok, Jorgensen noted that Choe Je-u was familiar with Jeonggamnok and that passages in his writings were quite similar to those found there. At the time, Yi dynasty officials were trying to eliminate Catholicism from Korea. Due to the textural similarities with Jeonggamnok and his use of the Catholic translation for the word God, the authorities became suspicious of Donghak. Choe Je-u and other leaders were arrested and executed and the Donghak religion was banned. These actions further enflamed the peasant followers of the religion and helped to instigate the Donghak Revolution.

=== Colonial period ===
The Japanese considered the Jeonggamnok as an example of what they viewed as the backward, superstitious nature of the Korean people. They initially promoted its distribution because it seemed to them to condone their overthrow of the Yi dynasty. However, the Korean people continued to be inspired by its revolutionary ideology which led to acts of resistance (many incited by religious sects) and these movements began to alarm Japanese officials.

Among the religious sects inspired by the Jeonggamnok, the Cheongnimgyo (founded in 1900) was of greatest concern. Its leader had predicted that the Japanese rule would end with a war in 1914, three years after annexation. During the March First Movement of 1919, many followers of the Jeonggamnok inspired religious groups moved to Mount Kyeryong – the predicted site of the new capital of the Jeong dynasty – and built villages there to prepare themselves for a "great calamity". Their expectations were based on text such as "the flow of blood becomes a river; for a hundred leagues to the south of the Han [River] there will be no sounds of chickens and dogs, and the shadows of people will be eliminated forever." Non-religious people also moved to the area and as a result the population there was doubled. Some newspapers dispatched undercover reporters to the area to investigate what were viewed as heretical sects. After the March 1st demonstrations, there was a crackdown on free speech. Editors of the Jeonggamnok were blamed by the Japanese government officials, not withstanding the fact that they themselves had initially promoted it. During the Pacific War the work helped fuel hope that the Japanese would be defeated, and that Korean liberation was at hand.

A lesser known aspect of the cultural clash between the Koreans and the Japanese was the Colored Clothes Campaign. Prior to colonization Korean people did not die their clothes perhaps because the cost was prohibitive. The Japanese claimed that this practice illustrated the weakness of the Korean people and initiated a campaign to force the wearing of colored clothes. Koreans were naturally reluctant to comply. The Japanese then viewed the wearing of white as a symbol of resistance. Those Koreans with firm beliefs in the Jeonggamnok were apparently particularly resistant. Kim Sa-Ryang wrote a novel (Deep in the Grass 풀숲 깊숙이, 1940) about the Colored Clothes campaign sympathetic to the Korean perspective. Once while staying, at a Buddhist temple, he observed a group of men and women in the front yard chanting. This is his report of what he heard: "We the white-wearing Joseon people cannot be saved without the power of Jeong-gam-rok. That book foretells, it's not difficult to understand it at all. According to Jeonggamnok, if one wears white clothes and chants a spell ... he or she could be saved....".

=== Post-liberation period ===
Even after liberation from Japanese colonial rule, belief in the predictions of Jeonggamnok continued to be influential. Prominent politicians claimed to be destined for high office based on the texts. Those making such claims include: former Presidents Roh Tae-woo, Kim Young-sam and Kim Dae-jung, and a former governor of the Nationalist Party Chung Ju-young.

In popular culture, Gyeogam Yurok, a book with a prophetic theme was published in 1977. Similar to Jeonggamnok, it utilized the technique of after-the-fact "prediction" to help establish fake authenticity.

The Jeonggamnok is the basis of the novel For the Emperor, by the Korean writer Yi Mun-yol who won the Republic of Korea Literature Prize for this work. The protagonist, always referred to as The Emperor, is a Don Quixote-esque hero who believes that he is ordained by heaven to found a new dynasty to replace the Yi (Joseon) dynasty and that his new dynasty would prosper for 800 years as predicted in the Jeonggamnok. His dream is to be a ruler who will free the kingdom from foreign domination, military and cultural. The latter is presented as a seemingly impossible task, a struggle that would require "madness" to sustain for a lifetime. Sol Sun-bung, author of the preface to his English translation, noted that although the Emperor's dream of becoming a ruler of the people failed in a practical sense, nonetheless at his death, he achieves "greater eminence by transcending all worldly preoccupations".

== Ten superior sites of refuge ==
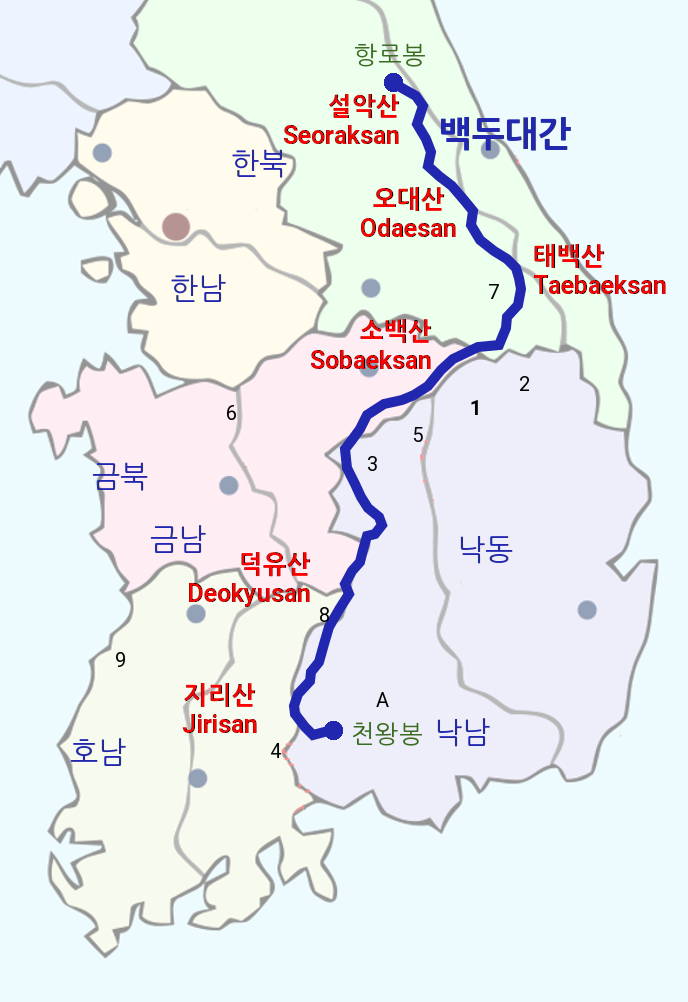

---to be developed---

According to several texts of the Jeonggamnok, the sipseungji 十勝地 are ten places where you can live in peace and take refuge from hunger and war. Here the names of nowadays are from the Chosun Ilbo, and the comments from the Nam Sago Secret as translated by Jorgensen. The blue line is 백두대간, Baekdu-daegan, the largest and longest mountain range on the Korean Peninsula from Mt. Baekdu to Mt. Jirisan.

- Chosun Ilbo "정감록에 기록된 10곳의 은신처 십승지(十勝地)" [Ten hidden places recorded in Jeonggamrok]. The Chosun Ilbo. 2015-01-08. Archived from the original on 2020-02-18.
- Yang Seung-mok 양승목 (2016). "조선후기 십승지 론의 전개와 '살 곳 찾기'의 향방" [A Study on the Unfolding of Sipseungji Theory During the Late Joseon Period and the Course of 'Finding a Place to Live']. 한국한문학연구 (Korean Literature Research) (63). The Korean Society of Chinese Literature: 97–133. doi:10.30527/klcc..63.201609.004.

== Sources ==
- Baker, Don (2018). "Book review. The Foresight of Dark Knowing: Chŏng Kam Nok and Insurrectionary Prognostication in Pre-Modern Korea by John Jorgensen". Acta Koreana. 21 (1): 601–04.
- Doopedia "정감록 (鄭鑑錄)" [Jeonggamnok]. Doosan Encyclopedia.
- EncyKor "정감록 (鄭鑑錄)" [Jeonggamnok]. Encyclopedia of Korean National Culture.
- Han Seung-Hoon 한승훈 (2018). "최초의 정감록 영역본. 그리고 한국 예언서 연구의 난제들" [The First English Translation of Jeonggamrok, and Some Problems in the Study of Prophetic Literature in Pre-modern Korea]. Korean Culture. 84 (84). Seoul National University Kyujanggak Institute of Korean Studies: 433–53. doi:10.22943/han.2018..84.012.
  - 한승훈 (2018). "최초의 정감록 영역본. 그리고 한국 예언서 연구의 난제들" [The First English Translation of Jeonggamrok, and Some Problems in the Study of Prophetic Literature in Pre-modern Korea] (PDF). Korean Culture (in Korean) (84). Seoul National University Kyujanggak Institute of Korean Studies: 433–53. doi:10.22943/han.2018..84.012.
- Jeong Yong-in (2009-02-03). "[커버스토리]대한민국 대표 예언서 (1) 정감록" [[Cover Story] Korea's Representative Prophetic Books (1) Jeonggammok]. Weekly Kyunghyang. 9 Cover Stories about prophecies.
- Jeongjo sillok "정조 6년 (1782) 11월 20일 계축 1: 문인방 등의 죄인을 국문하여 역모사건에 대해 알아내다" [Mun In-bang and other sinners interrogated in a treason case (1782-11-20, art.1)]. Annals of the Joseon Dynasty (Jeongjo). World Archives of Korea.
- Jeongjo sillok "정조 6년 (1782) 12월 10일 계축 3: 죄인 안필복·안치복 등의 방면을 명하다" [Order the criminals Ahn Pil-bok, Ahn Chi-bok, etc. (1782-12-10, art.3)]. Annals of the Joseon Dynasty (Jeongjo). World Archives of Korea.
- Jorgensen The Foresight of Dark Knowing: Chŏng Kam Nok and Insurrectionary Prognostication in Pre-modern Korea. Translated by Jorgensen, John. Hawai'i University Press. 2018. ISBN 9780824875381., 451 pages
- Karlsson, Anders (2001). "Challenging the Dynasty: Popular Protest, Jeonggamnok and the Ideology of the Hong Gyeongnae Rebellion". International Journal of Korean History. 2: 253–77.
- Kim Hawon 김하원 (2004). 격암유록은 가짜 정감록은 엉터리 송하비결은? [What is the secret of Gyeogam Yurok's fake Jeonggamnok?]. 인언 (Ineon, Seoul). ISBN 9788995510018., 440 pages.
- Kim, Seok-hee (2011). "Joseon in Color:"Colored Clothes Campaign" and the "White Clothes Discourse". The Review of Korean Studies. 14 (1): 7–34. doi:10.25024/review.2011.14.1.001.
- Kim, Sun Joo Marginality and Subversion in Korea: The Hong Kyŏngnae Rebellion. University of Washington Press. 2007. ISBN 9780295989310., 294 pages
- Kim Tak 김탁 (2005). 정감록 새 세상을 꿈꾸는 민중들의 예언서 [Jeonggamnok: Prophecy Book of People Dreaming of a New World]. 살림출판사 (Salim Publishing House). ISBN 9788952204431., 313 pages.
- Lee, Dong-Ha (2009). "이문열의 소설과 기독교" [Moon-yeol Lee 's novels and Christianity]. Korean Contemporary Literature Research (in Korean). 28: 487–520 – via DBpia.
- Pratt, Keith L.; Rutt, Richard; Hoare, James (1999). Korea, A Historical and Cultural Dictionary. Routledge/Curzon. ISBN 978-0-7007-0464-4., 594 pages
- Seungjeonwon ilgi "정조 11년 7월 15일, 30/30 기사" [Jeongjo 11th, 1787-07-15, art. 30]. Seungjeongwon Diary. World Archives of Korea.
- Shin, Seungyop (2020). "Text Beyond Context: Power, Discourse, and the Chŏng Kam nok in Colonial Korea". Journal of Korean Religions. 11 (1): 123–53. doi:10.1353/jkr.2020.0004. S2CID 226727109 – via Project Muse.
- Sol, Sun-bong (1986). "Preface". Hail to the Emperor by Yi Mun-yol. Pace International Research. pp. v–vii.
- Tanenbaum, Michelle (2006). "The Reception of "Don Quixote" in Korea". Review of Japanese Culture and Society. 18: 46–56. JSTOR i40106493.
- Yoon, Hong-key (2014). "Geomancy and social upheveals in Korea" (PDF). European Journal of Geopolitics. 2: 5–23.
