= Gyeogam Yurok =

The Gyeogam Yurok (Korean: 격암유록, Hanja: 格菴遺錄), also known as the Namsago Prophecy (Korean: 남사고 예언서, Hanja: 南師古豫言書), is a book with prophecies attributed to Joseon scholar Nam Sago (1509–1571) who styled himself "Gyeogam".

== Scholar ==
Nam Sago (남사고, 南師古, 1509–1571) was a scholar of the Joseon period of Korea, who was styled Gyeogam. He is said to have mastered (通達) Occult_sciences (易學), feng shui (風水), astronomy (天文), fortune-telling (卜筮) and face-reading (相法). In his later years, he served as Astronomy Professor (天文敎授) at Gwansanggam (觀象監). He was known for poems and prose with prophetic intents.

== Book ==
In 1977, Lee Do-eun donated a book titled Gyeogam Yurok (Korean: 격암유록) containing a set of prophecies attributed to Nam Sago.

These prophecies supposedly unveiled the mysteries of 450 years of Korean history, forecasting many events of the past such as the Imjin War, the Donghak Peasant Revolution, the [ Japan–Korea Annexation Treaty] of 1910, as well as the liberation and division of the Korean Peninsula, the Korean War, the 4·19 Revolution (1960) and the 5·16 military coup d'état (1961).

In 1995, Kim Hawon criticized the book as a forgery; many of its elements have been branded as anachronisms.

In any case, a copy of this book is kept in the National Library of Korea.
