= Hong Kyŏngnae's Rebellion =

1812 Korean peasant rebellion

- Part of 19th-century peasant rebellions in Korea
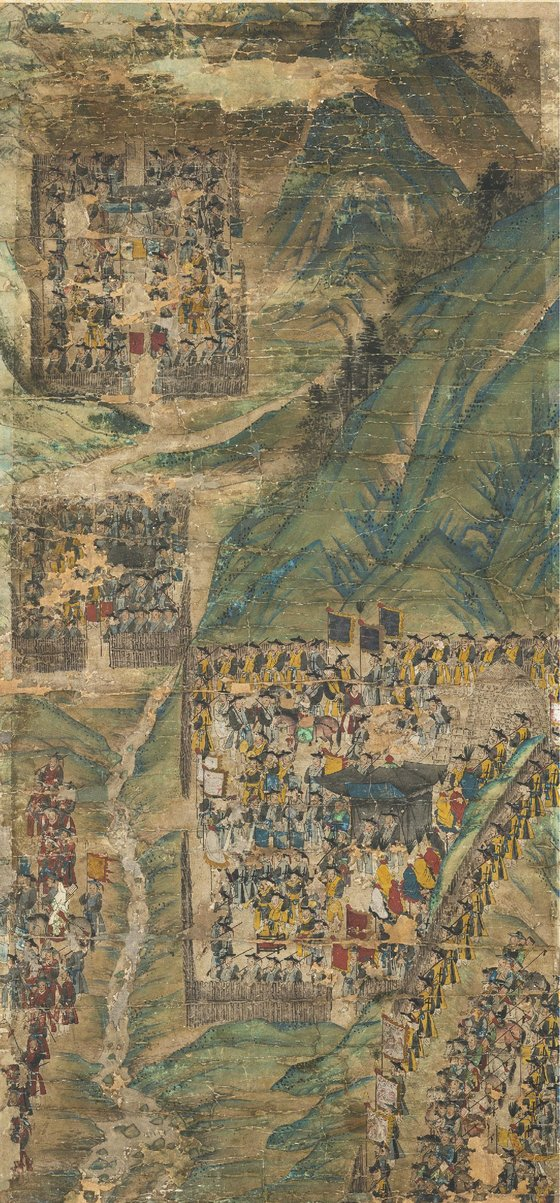
- Painting of government soldiers preparing to lay siege to Hong Kyŏngnae's rebels at Jeongju.
Date	31 January 1812 – 29 May 1812
Location	Pyeongan Province
Result	Government Victory: Rebellion suppressed; Joseon Dynasty severely weakened

Belligerents
Joseon Army	Hong Kyŏngnae's Rebel Army

Commanders and leaders
Sunjo of Joseon; Lee Young-sik; Lee Hae-seung	Hong Kyŏngnae †; Wu Kun-cheok (executed); Kim Sar-yong (executed); Hong chong-gak (executed); Kim Chan-si (executed)

Strength
8,000 soldiers	5,000 rebels and civilians

Casualties and losses
70 soldiers killed, 137 wounded	3000 rebels and civilians were arrested and about 2000 executed, including boys as young as 10 years old.

- Hong Kyŏngnae's Rebellion
- Hangul: 홍경래의 난
- Hanja: 洪景來의 亂
- RR: Hong Gyeongraeui nan
- MR: Hong Kyŏngnaeŭi nan

Hong Kyŏngnae's Rebellion (Korean: 홍경래의 난; Hanja: 洪景來의 亂) was a peasant revolt that occurred between 31 January 1812 and 29 May 1812 in Joseon. It was led by Hong Kyŏngnae and the upperclass yangban of Pyeongan Province, who were unhappy with a tax regime based on government-administered high-interest loans. Impoverished farmers joined them following a year of exceptionally poor harvest, when they were forced nonetheless to contribute to a "grain fund". It is also called the Gwanseo Peasant War.

The rebellion was initially quite successful. At its height, the rebels controlled most of the area north of the Cheongcheon River, including the town of Jeongju, which was fortified to withstand invasions from Manchuria (then part of Qing China). Whenever the rebels took over a district, they distributed government grain to the people.

However, the rebels suffered defeats in the battles of Pine Grove and Four Pine Field, which caused them to withdraw to Jeongju. There, they came under siege by government forces. The rebellion was put down a few months later, on 19 April, when the government forces breached the town wall with a gunpowder charge. Hong Kyŏngnae was killed in the fighting. Other rebel leaders were also killed in battle or executed. Thousands of people caught up in the uprising, including boys as young as 10, who were also executed.

Although it failed, Hong Kyŏngnae's rebellion may have provided momentum for other popular armed uprisings in different parts of Korea seeking a more just society. The culmination of these was the Donghak Rebellion in 1894, centered in southern province of Jeolla.

== Background ==
As king Sunjo ascended the throne at a young age, Queen Dowager Jeongsun, the second queen of King Yeongjo, ruled as queen regent and wielded power over state affairs. Despite King Sunjo's efforts to reform politics, the fundamental principles of government deteriorated. The state examination became disordered, and corruption in the government personnel administration prevailed, resulting in disorder in society and riots among the people.

== Factors of discontent ==
Many social, political, economic, and intellectual factors potentially led to the rebellion. Among those considered by Sun Joo Kim, author of a treatise on this topic, include:

- Poverty and discontent among the farmers in Pyongan Province. These were brought on by the naturally low fertility of soils in the area compared to those in the southern part of Korea, poor weather conditions at the time, which led to partial crop failure, and high-interest rates on loans extracted despite the poor harvest.
- Particularly high de facto tax rates for more well-off landowners. These took the form of grain funds and monetary loans, which had to be paid back at high-interest.
- Cross-border trade policies and taxes on imported goods from China negatively impacted Pyeongan merchants.
- Signs and prophetic works, particularly the Jeonggamnok, foretold that the Joseon (Yi) dynasty would fall and be replaced by a new, more just dynasty.
- Rivalries among the yangban were triggered by government policies to encourage or force movements of yangban from the south to Pyongan Province to better integrate it into the Joseon political fabric. However, this policy stoked tensions between the established yangban organizations and the newly arrived yangban.
- Discrimination against high-level civil service examination passers from Pyongan Province at the Joseon court.

Sun Joo Kim favored this last cause (Discrimination against those from Pyongan Province) as the primary cause. She noted key evidence for this conclusion was the manifesto posted by the rebels in the early stage of the rebellion, which begins:

The central government abandoned (Pyeongan) Province as one abandons rotten earth. Even when the slaves of powerful families saw men from (Pyeongan) Province, they always called them "the common rabble from (Pyongan). How unfair and what a source of resentment this is for the people of (Pyeongan) Province!.

Another scholar of the rebellion, Anders Karlsson, disagreed with this assessment and offered counterarguments. He considered that the manifesto, written in classical Chinese, would have been incomprehensible to the predominately uneducated army or even most of its leaders. He suggested that perhaps its primary purpose was to legitimize the rebellion and seek the support of those members of the educated elite that had not already joined the rebels. His work emphasized the importance of the ideologies espoused in the prophetic works. However, in the end, he concludes that the relative importance of the various potential causes remains.

=== Basic arguments for the revolution ===
Hong Kyŏngnae (a geomancer) travelled extensively to find and create support for the rebellion, seeking for geomantically auspicious sites and to fully understand the discontent and to spread a revolutionary ideology. He relied on two basic arguments to gain supporters for the revolution:

1. The Confucian precept that the hardships in the lives of the people and the natural disasters that had recently occurred were a sign/result of the withdrawal of the Mandate of Heaven from the ruling dynasty. Government corruption and events such as famine, winter lightning, and earthquakes were linked to the perpetual dynastic cycle in which one dynasty is replaced by another.
2. In the secret writings of the Jeonggamnok, it is predicted long ago that the fall of the dynasty and the establishment of a new, nearly utopian dynasty. This work predicted that a True Man with the surname Jeong (Chŏng) would lead an army to bring about this change. Even the year 1812 was purported to be predicted. Rebel instigators claimed that their followers would be the vanguard of True Man Jeong's army, and they employed a figurehead leader with that name.

== Leaders during the rebellion ==
=== Rebels Leaders ===
Wu Kun-cheok (U Kunch'ik) was a professional geomancer and used his knowledge of secret prophecies to recruit sympathizers to the rebel cause. He first met Hong Kyŏngnae at the Blue Dragon Temple, where they had studied. They met again in 1801 when they discussed the possibility of rallying supporters for a rebellion. When the rebels launched their first attack, he dressed in a crane-like robe and carried a white feathered fan. He appears to have been the director of a gold mine that raised money for the rebellion. He also mastered martial arts and personally commanded rebel forces in some battles. At the end of the rebellion, he escaped from Jeongju, where Hong Kyŏngnae and other rebels were besieged by government troops but were captured a few days later. While under interrogation, he claimed he was forced to join the rebellion, but evidence indicates that he was one of the masterminds. His claim was not accepted, and he was executed.

Kim Sar-yong (Kim Sayong) was a yangban. Although poor, he had many family connections with officials in Pyongan Province, which helped him recruit them to the rebel cause. He led one of the two rebel armies. His army was the first to enter Jeongju and captured the district seats, garrisons, and other strategic locations west of Jeongju. However, his army was defeated at the Battle of Four Pine Field and subsequently dispersed by government forces. He then joined the remaining rebels in Jeongju, where he fell in battle.

Hong Chong-gak (Hong Ch'onggak), also known as Hong Bong-ui, was a poor peddler and famously strong. He was appointed head of the second rebel army which led the first attack at Kason on 31 January 1812. He captured several important towns/strategic locations east of Jeongju, but a delay in his planned advance on Anju due to an internal rebel dispute allowed the organization of a regional government army that defeated his army at Pine Grove. He then joined the rebel force at Jeongju, where he aided in its defense. However, he failed to recognize the danger posed by the tunneling efforts of the government forces, which was used to place a gunpowder charge under the wall. After Jeongju fell, he was captured and executed.

Kim Chan-si was a yangban who had passed the lower-level civil service exam. Government reports indicated that he was in debt, which led him to join the rebels. He was popular among the local yangban, which helped in recruiting others. He composed a puzzle-like song that foretold the fall of the Joseon dynasty in 1812, which was incorporated into the Jeonggamnok. He also composed the rebel manifesto (written in literary Chinese), which was intended to justify the rebellion. After the battle of Pine Grove, he joined other rebels in a camp north of Jeongju. When the tide was turning against the rebels, he went on a mission to recruit help from sympathizers along the border region near the Amnok (Yalu) river. However, while on the way, he was beheaded as he slept. The betrayer sold his head to another who attempted to get a reward from the government; however, both men were executed.

=== Government Officials ===
Lee Young-sik (Yi Yŏngsik) was the magistrate of Gwaksan (Kwaksan). He was captured by the rebels but escaped with the aid of a loyal military officer. His two brothers and a son became victims of the rebels. After his escape, he went to Jeongju to warn of the rebel threat, but it was too late. He then went to Anju, where he led reinforcements that assured victory at the nearby Pine Grove (Songlim ) battle. He also led the regional army at the Four Pine Field (Sasongra) battle and was victorious there. The loss of these two battles was disastrous for the rebels.

Lee Hae-Seung (Yi Haesŭng) was the army inspector of Anju military headquarters. He led the regional government force at Pine Grove. After it appeared that the rebels had the upper hand, reinforcements led by Lee Young-sik assured victory for the regional force. A report by a central government army officer indicated that he was cowardly and had to be driven out of the gate to participate in the battle. However, after the victory, he became vicious and greedy. It took 30 horses to carry away the goods he took after the battle. His troops also ransacked and burned recaptured rebel-held towns. They also took part in the siege of Jeongju.

Other important government officers included: Pak Kip'ung (Park Ki-pung), the supreme field commander of the central government pacification force. He arrived at Jeongju on 15 February 1812, and took overall charge of the siege. Yu Hyowon replaced Pak due to his inability to put down the rebellion. Yu arrived at Jeongju on 9 April. The force surrounding Jeongju also included a large contingent of Pyeongan provincial troops. There were over 8,000 government troops deployed throughout the siege.

== Preparation ==
December 1810 to January 1812: The material preparations for the rebellion appeared to have begun in 1810 when Hong Kyŏngnae and Wu Kun-cheok met again at the Blue Dragon Temple. Hong Kyŏngnae was accompanied by a man named Jeong Chem-in (Chŏng Chemin), who was the figurehead leader of the rebellion, thus fulfilling the prophecy in the Jeonggamnok that a man named Jeong would lead an army that would overthrow the Joseon dynasty. Hong Kyŏngnae also stated that thousands of Ming dynasty troops were secretly stationed in the area and would join the rebels once the rebellion began. In the manifesto written to justify the rebellion, these troops were referred to using a term that implied that they were Ming soldiers (i.e., descendants of the previous Chinese Ming dynasty subjects), which would have been viewed more favorably by the Korean yangban. This promise did not materialize, but it was useful for recruiting purposes.

The rebel family used connections and friendships within yangban organizations to recruit a network of yangban fifth columnists and field officers. The networks were also useful for raising money to buy materials needed by the rebels. Rank and file soldiers were recruited by advertising for gold miners. It was an effective mechanism because the famine had caused many farmers and peddlers to be desperate for a way to make a living. Even bankrupt yangban responded to the advertisement, although the rebels normally disdained menial work.

They established a secret base at Dabog (Tabok) village. Hong Kyŏngnae moved his family there, including his mother, wife, sons, brothers, and nephews. As noted above, two armies were constituted there and equipped with uniforms and weapons: one under the leadership of Kim Sar-yong and the other under Hong Chong-gak.

== Rebellion ==
31 January to 15 February 1812: In the early stages of the rebellion, the rebels appeared to be quite successful. The starting date had been set for 1 February, but the campaign had to be launched on 31 January because district leaders had become suspicious. The first district town to be captured was Kasan, located only a few miles from their secret base at Dabog. The attack was led by Hong Chong-gak, who led a force of 30 to 40 cavalrymen and about 150-foot soldiers. A clerk of the district office welcomed the rebels, but the magistrate refused to submit and was killed along with his son. The following day Hong's army moved to Bakcheon (Pakch'on) by way of the ferry station downstream and set up its basecamp there. A dispute over strategy led to an unsuccessful assassination attempt on Hong Kyŏngnae and a delay in the further advance of Hong's army. The dissidents had hoped to move swiftly to Anju, the walled city south of the Cheongcheon River before the government had a chance to prepare for an attack, but they never put their plan into action.

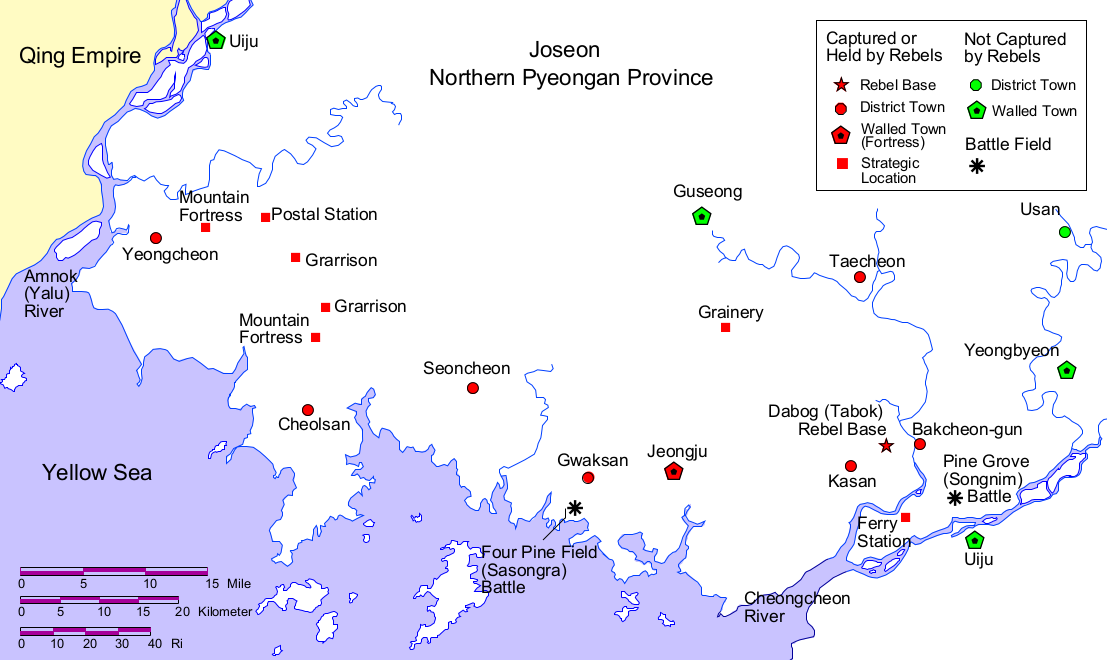
Map of important sites relevant to the Hong Kyŏngnae rebellion of 1812 in northern Pyongan Province, Joseon (Korea)

Meanwhile, the rebel army led by Kim captured Gwaksan (Kwaksan), where the fifth column greeted them. The wounded magistrate escaped first to the fortified town of Jeongju, where he warned of the impending attack on the town. The warning was of no avail because the fifth column was able to take over. The armies of Kim and Hong converged on Jeongju from 2 to 4 February.

The combined force of the two rebel armies under the command of Kim took over Seongcheon on 4 February after it surrendered without a fight. However, the walled town of Guseong (Kusŏng) did not surrender to the rebels.

Hong replenished his forces at Jeongju and marched northeast to take over Tacheon on 7 February. The town fell easily because the magistrate fled before Hong's army arrived. Kim's army was also successful. By 10 February, the rebels captured an important granary south of Guseong and the district seat at Cheolsan (Ch'ŏlsan). At that point, the rebels controlled much of the Pyeongan Province north of the Cheongcheon River. Whenever rebels took over a district, they opened the government granaries and distributed the grain to the people to gain support. They also took government funds to use as payment for their peasant soldiers.

The walled town of Yeongbyeon (Yŏngby'ŏn), a natural fortress, was a notable exception to the success in the east. Government forces discovered a rebel network in the town before an attack by the rebels could be mounted, and the rebel leaders were executed. Government troops from Guseong (Kusŏng) also arrived and successfully defended the town.

In addition, the failure to move swiftly to Anju allowed time for a regional force to be organized there. When Hong's army moved to attack Anju, they were met by the regional government forces assembled from surrounding districts and forces who had fled from rebel-captured areas to the east. The battle occurred at Pine Grove, about 10 ri (4 kilometers) north of Anju, where the rebels suffered a disastrous defeat on 11 February. Lee Hae-Seung led the Anju force, but he received crucial reinforcement from Lee Young-Sik.

Even after the defeat of Hong's army at Pine Grove, Kim's army captured the district seat at Yeongcheon (Yongch'ŏn) and other strategic facilities. There were plans to capture the walled city of Uiju, but these failed when the military leader there who had planned to join the rebels changed his mind and even executed his wife and son, who were rebel sympathizers. Moreover, prospects for the rebels diminished following a battle between Kim's army and that of Lee Young-Sik. As previously noted, Lee was the magistrate of Gwaksan who had escaped. He was able to reorganize an army and provided crucial reinforcements at the battle of Pine Grove. The battle between Kim and Lee occurred at the battle of Four Pine Field on 21 February. Kim's rebel army suffered a disastrous defeat. Continued attacks from government forces caused Kim's army to disintegrate, and his soldiers were dispersed. He then joined the rebels at Jeongju, where the defense of the fortress-like town was underway.

=== Siege of Jeongju ===
15 February to 29 May 1812: The siege of Jeongju began with the regional army's arrival under Lee Hae-Seung's command on 15 February 1812, during which seven provincial companies joined Pyongyang and the central government pacification army from Seoul. Park Ki-pung led the pacification army and took control of the siege. The government forces totaled over 8,000 throughout the blockade. The population within the town was about 4,000, including children and elders. There were about 360 trained rebel soldiers. They witnessed the destruction of the regional force and arriving conscripts, and the population was committed to the defense; they presumably assumed they had no other choice. Initially, morale was high, and the defenders repulsed many attempts by government troops to scale the walls or breach a gate. Major attacks occurred on 17 and 19 February. An attack on 27 February included a cart loaded with gunpowder intended to destroy the gate, but it got stuck and never reached the gate. Attacks on 16 March and 6 April included battle carts designed to allow soldiers to fire down on the defenders, but these also failed.

While rebel morale was high initially, it began to falter as food and supplies dwindled. Hong Gyeon-Rae tried to lift spirits by claiming Qing troops were on their way to break the siege. He declared that they would arrive on 29 May.

Meanwhile, there was a change in the leadership of the government forces. Yu Hyowon was named the new leader of the pacification army. The army planned to dig two tunnels (on the east and north sides of the town) under the wall and plant gunpowder charges there. The rebels were fatally dismissive of the tunnels. On 29 May, the same day the rebels expected Ming troops, a gunpowder charge exploded in the north tunnel. The army breached the wall, finally allowing the government forces to enter the city. Hong Kyŏngnae was killed in the fighting. Other rebel leaders, including Wu Kun-cheok and Hong Chong-gak, were captured and executed. In addition, nearly 3000 people were arrested, and about 2000 were executed, including boys as young as 10. The rebellion was over.

== Legacy ==
The rebellion was of great concern to the Joseon government. It concluded that the main causes of the rebellion were corrupt officials and excessive taxation during the famine. Lee Hae-Seung was identified as a prime example of a corrupt official. The government enacted relief measures for the province. These included: the cancelation of taxes until there was a good harvest, forgiveness of loans, and holding a provincial civil service examination to facilitate the advancement of scholars from the area. Nevertheless, it provided momentum for other popular armed uprisings seeking a more just society in different parts of Korea. The culmination of these was the Donghak Rebellion in 1894, centered in southern province of Jeolla.

== See also ==
- Military history of Korea
- Donghak Peasant Revolution
- Sunjo of Joseon
- 홍경래의 난 (洪景來의 亂) Hong Gyyeong-rae's Rebellion
