= Hong Kyŏngnae =

Korean rebel leader (1780–1812)

- 홍경래
- Born: 1780; Yonggang, Joseon
- Died: 1812 (age 31–32); Gyeongju, Joseon
- Known for: Organizing and rebel leader during the Hong Kyŏngnae's Rebellion

Korean name
- Hangul: 홍경래
- Hanja: 洪景來
- RR: Hong Gyeongrae
- MR: Hong Kyŏngnae

Hong Kyŏngnae (Korean: 홍경래; Hanja: 洪景來; 1780–1812) was a rebel leader in Pyeongan Province, Joseon in the early 19th century. He was born in Yonggang to the Namyang Hong clan. His background is uncertain. By some accounts, he was a fallen yangban (social and political elite). However, the best evidence is that he was an educated commoner and professional geomancer. He was known for leading a rebellion in Pyongan Province against the central government who were unhappy with their treatment by the central government and an oppressive de facto tax regime based on government-administered high-interest loans and perhaps by rivalries among yangban groups, but was killed in battle.

== Biography ==
Hong Kyŏngnae was born in Yonggang, in the southern part of Pyongan province, one of the eight provinces of Joseon (Korea) to a family of the Namyang Hong lineage. While some scholars have indicated that he was a yangban; this idea may have stemmed from a fictionalized account of his life based on a Chinese novel translated into Korean. The best evidence is that he was a somewhat educated commoner, perhaps a member of the provincial military. His learning allowed him to become a professional geomancer. As such, he had more opportunities to travel than would ordinarily be the case because one of the tasks of a geomancer was to find auspicious locations for gravesites. Hong claimed that the gravesite he had chosen for his father was very encouraging and would protect him. He traveled extensively to find auspicious sites for his clientele in various places. It helped him understand their discontents and spread a revolutionary ideology.

=== Rebellion ===
He relied on two basic arguments to gain supporters for the revolution:

1. The Confucian precept that the hardships in the lives of the people and the natural disasters that had recently occurred were a sign/result of the withdrawal of the Mandate of Heaven from the ruling dynasty. Government corruption and events such as famine, winter lightning, and earthquakes were linked to the perpetual dynastic cycle in which one dynasty is replaced by another.
2. In the secret writings of the Jeonggamnok, it is predicted long ago that the fall of the dynasty and the establishment of a new, nearly utopian dynasty. This work predicted that a True Man with the surname Jeong (Chŏng) would lead an army to bring about this change. Even the year 1812 was purported to be predicted. Rebel instigators claimed that their followers would be the vanguard of True Man Jeong's army, and they employed a figurehead leader with that name.

Although negatively portrayed in government documents, Hong appears to have been a strong and capable leader. He displayed exemplary Confucian behavior when he ordered a proper burial for an illustrious government official, who had been killed by the rebels and was regarded as "righteous" for maintaining his loyalty to the existing dynasty. He also directed that the body of another man who died resisting the rebellion, a well-known filial son, be taken away by his son for a proper burial and said he regretted his death.

He was described as physically powerful and a master of martial arts. He directed preparations for the war and personally commanded the rebellion. However, there was some dispute among rebel leaders over strategy. Two leaders, whose plan for a speedy attack on government forces after their initial defeat was not adopted, concluded that the rebellion would be lost. In an attempt to redeem themselves in the eyes of the government, they tried to assassinate Hong with swords, but he was able to fend them off and kill them. The resulting delay was highly detrimental to the rebels because it allowed the government forces to regroup. Hong continued to lead the rebel forces until the walled town of Jeongju, where the rebels were besieged, fell. He was shot and killed in this last battle which ended the rebellion, and was posthumously punished.

== In popular culture ==
- Hong Kyŏngnae was portrayed by Park Chan-hwan in the 2001 MBC TV series The Merchant.
- Hong Kyŏngnae was portrayed by Jung Hae-kyun in the 2016 KBS2 TV series Love in the Moonlight.

== See also ==
- Donghak Peasant Revolution

== Sources ==
- Jorgensen The Foresight of Dark Knowing: Chŏng Kam Nok and Insurrectionary Prognostication in Pre-modern Korea. Translated by Jorgensen, John. Hawai'i University Press. 2018. ISBN 9780824875381., 451 pages
- Karlsson, Anders (2001). "Challenging the Dynasty: Popular Protest, Jeonggamnok and the Ideology of the Hong Gyeongnae Rebellion". International Journal of Korean History. 2: 253–277.
- Karlsson, Anders (2009). "Book Review: Marginality and Subversion in Korea: The Hong Kyongnae Rebellion of 1812. By Sun Joo Kim. Seattle: University of Washington Press, 2007. 294 pp., $50, ISBN 978-0-295-98684-5 (hardcover)". The Review of Korean Studies. 12 (2): 211–215.
- Kim, Jinwung A History of Korea: From "Land of the Morning Calm" to States in Conflict. Indiana University Press. 2012. ISBN 9780253000248., 720 pages
- Kim, Sun Joo Marginality and Subversion in Korea: The Hong Kyŏngnae Rebellion. University of Washington Press. 2007. ISBN 9780295989310., 294 pages
- Yoon, Hong-key (2014). "Geomancy and social upheveals in Korea" (PDF). European Journal of Geopolitics. 2: 5–23.
