= Keith Pratt =

British scholar of East Asia (born 1938)

Keith Leslie Pratt (born 27 January 1938) is a British historian and orientalist. He is Professor Emeritus in the Department of East Asian Studies at Durham University.

== Biography ==
Pratt was born in London and educated at Durham University, where he graduated with a BA (1962) and Dip. Ed (1963). He briefly worked as a teacher in Hartlepool before returning to Durham University in 1964 as a lecturer in Chinese.

His research interests later shifted to Korean studies and he has written numerous books and articles on Korean history and culture. He became head of the Department of East Asian Studies at Durham in 1989 and retired in 1997.

== Selected publications ==
- Pratt, Keith (1968). Visitors to China: Eyewitness Accounts of Chinese History. London: Macmillan.
- ——— (1971). Peking in the Early Seventeenth Century. London: Oxford University Press. ISBN 9780199130245.
- ——— (1987). Korean Music: Its History and Its Performance. London: Faber Music. ISBN 9780571100811.
- ——— (1995). Korean Painting. New York: Oxford University Press. ISBN 9780195858853.
- ———; Rutt, Richard (1999). Korea: A Historical and Cultural Dictionary. London: Routledge. ISBN 9780700704637.
- ——— (2002). Old Seoul. Hong Kong: Oxford University Press. ISBN 9780195930870.
- ——— (2007). Everlasting Flower: A History of Korea. London: Reaktion Books. ISBN 9781861893352.
