= Doosan Encyclopedia =

Korean-language encyclopedia

Doosan Encyclopedia 두산세계대백과사전
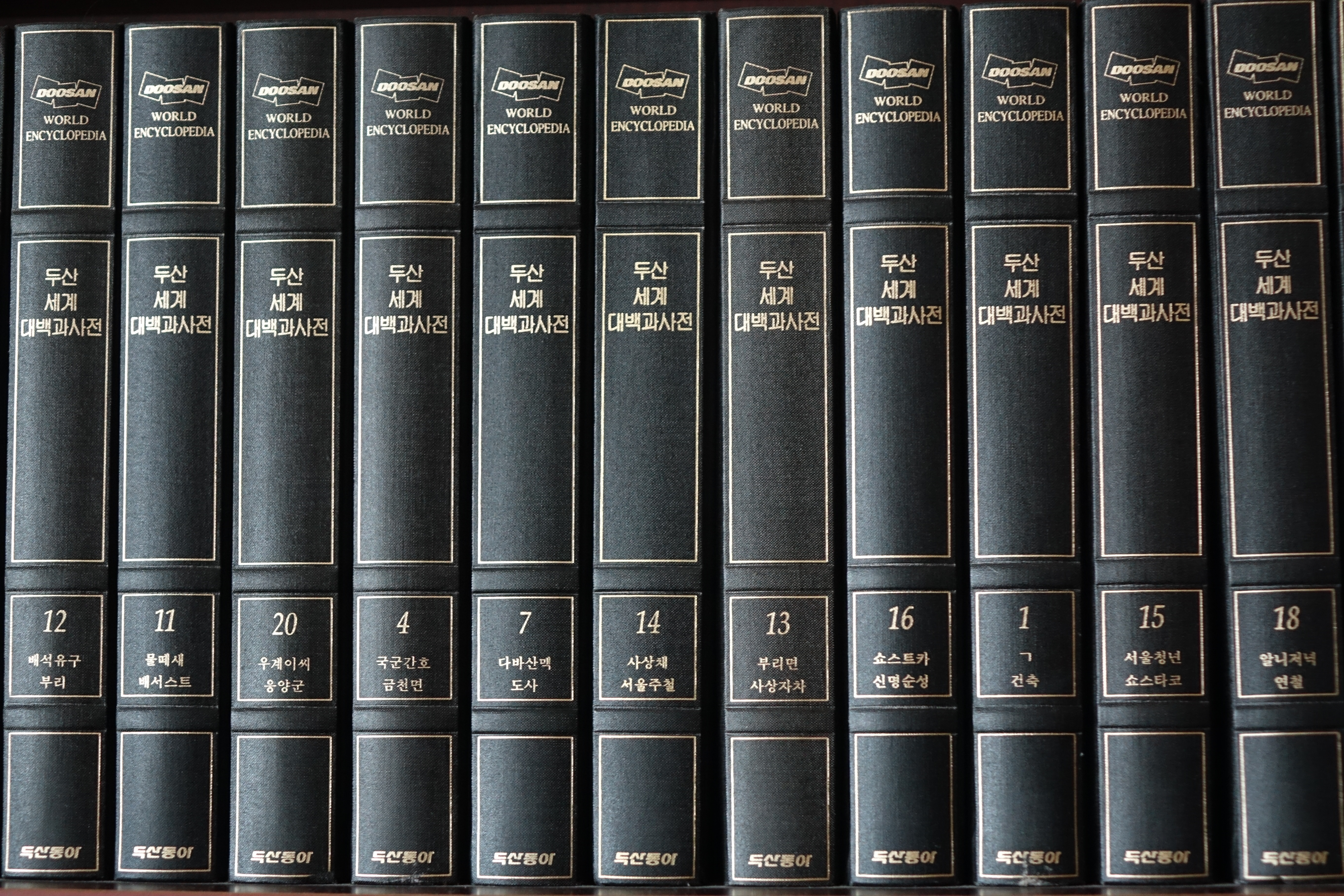
- Author: editorial staff
- Language: Korean
- Genre: Reference encyclopedia
- Publisher: Doosan Corp
- Publication date: 1982–present
- Publication place: South Korea
- Media type: 30 volumes (hardbound)
- Website: www.doopedia.co.kr

Korean name
- Hangul: 두산세계대백과사전
- Hanja: 斗山世界大百科事典
- RR: Dusan segye daebaekgwasajeon
- MR: Tusan segye taebaekkwasajŏn

Doosan Encyclopedia (Korean: 두산세계대백과사전; lit. 'Doosan World Great Encyclopedia') is a Korean-language encyclopedia published by Doosan Donga (두산동아). The encyclopedia is based on the Dong-A Color Encyclopedia (동아원색세계대백과사전), which comprises 30 volumes and began to be published in 1982 by Dong-A Publishing (동아출판사). Dong-A Publishing was merged into Doosan Donga, a subsidiary of Doosan Group, in February 1985. The Doosan Encyclopedia is a major encyclopedia in South Korea.

== Digital edition ==
=== EnCyber ===
The online version of the Doosan Encyclopedia was named EnCyber, which is a blend of two English words: Encyclopedia and Cyber. The company has stated that, with the trademark, it aims to become a center of living knowledge. EnCyber provides free content to readers via South Korean portals such as Naver. Naver has risen to the top position in the search engine market of South Korea partially because of the popularity of EnCyber encyclopedia. When Naver exclusively contracted Doosan Doonga in 2003, the former paid multi billion won to the latter in royalties. That service ended in August 2025.

In early 2000s, EnCyber was regarded as a major encyclopedia in South Korea. As of 2009, EnCyber was the biggest online encyclopedia of South Korea.

=== Doopedia ===
On November 1, 2010, the digital version of Doosan Encyclopedia was renamed 'doopedia', a portmanteau from the company name 'Doosan' and the English word 'encyclopedia'. On 7 November 2013 were 463,953 items in the 'doopedia' available. In the Korean Wikipedia on that day there were 252,830 articles.

== See also ==
- Encyclopedia of Korean Culture
- List of digital library projects
- List of encyclopedias by language
- List of online encyclopedias
- Lists of encyclopedias
